= ACF Fiorentina Hall of Fame =

Hall of fame of the Florence-based football club

Coordinates: 43°45′02.4″N 11°14′35.6″E

- Sport: Association football
- Awarded for: Men's and women's Fiorentina first teams that have made history at the club
- Local name: Hall of Fame Viola (Italian)
- Country: Italy
- Presented by: ACF Fiorentina; Museo Fiorentina

History
- First award: 2012
- Editions: 11
- Website: Official website

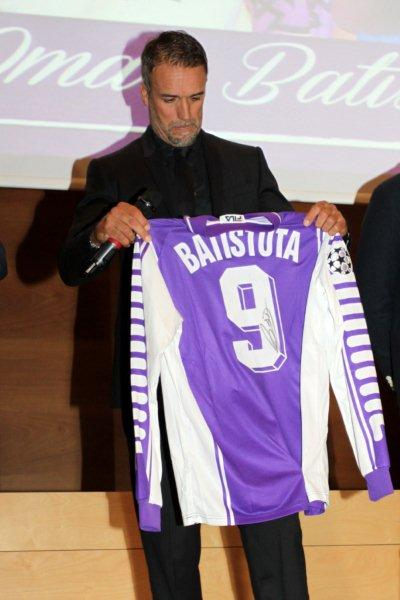
Gabriel Batistuta holding his old Fiorentina jersey at a 2014 ceremony inducting him into the club's Hall of Fame.

This is a list of ACF Fiorentina players who have been inducted into the club's Hall of Fame.

== History and regulations ==
ACF Fiorentina's Hall of Fame has been launched in 2012, resulting from a collaboration between ACF Fiorentina and Museo Fiorentina. Fiorentina has been the first Italian football club to launch such initiative.

The award is given to players, managers, sporting directors, staff members, and historical supporters who have significantly marked the club's history. The inductees are selected by Museo Fiorentina and voted by a jury elected by the Collegio del Marzocco. The recipient are rewarded with the Marzocco Viola award, a statuette designed by the artist Marco Cantini and made by the silversmith Federico Sassoli. Portraits of the recipients are also made by Claudio Sacchi.

The 2020 edition was postponed due to the COVID-19 pandemic.

== Hall of Fame ==
=== Players ===
Positions key
GK	Goalkeeper
DF	Defender
MF	Midfielder
FW	Forward

Year	Player	Pos.	Fiorentina career	Apps.	Goals	Honours with Fiorentina	Ref.
2012	(Italy) Giancarlo Antognoni	MF	1972–1987	429	72	1974–75 Coppa Italia	
2012	(Sweden) Kurt Hamrin	FW	1958–1967	362	208	1960–61 Coppa Italia, 1960–61 European Cup Winners' Cup, 1965–66 Coppa Italia	
2012	(Italy) Giuseppe Chiappella (Note: Giuseppe Chiappella also managed Fiorentina from 1963 to 1968.)	DF	1948–1952	345	5	1955–56 Serie A	
2012	(Italy) Vittorio Staccione	MF	1927–1931	94	0	1930–31 Serie B	
2012	(Italy) Mario Pizziolo	MF	1929–1936	203	3	1930–31 Serie B	
2012	(Italy) Giuseppe Brizi	DF	1962–1976	389	2	1965–66 Coppa Italia, 1968–69 Serie A, 1974–75 Coppa Italia	
2012	(Italy) Christian Riganò	FW	2002–2006	100	62	–	
2013	(Italy) Giovanni Galli	GK	1977–1986	323	0	–	
2013	(Italy) Italo Bandini	MF	1926–1927; 1928–1930	30	4	–	
2013	(Italy) Stefano Borgonovo	FW	1988–1989; 1990–1992	77	23	–	
2013	(Italy) Ferruccio Valcareggi (Note: Ferruccio Valcareggi also managed Fiorentina from 1962 to 1964 and during the 1984–85 season.)	MF	1940–1943; 1947–1948	126	27	–	
2013	(Italy) Giancarlo De Sisti (Note: Giancarlo De Sisti also managed Fiorentina from 1981 to 1985.)	MF	1965–1974	348	41	1965–66 Coppa Italia, 1968–69 Serie A	
2013	(Italy) Giuliano Sarti	GK	1954–1963	220	0	1955–56 Serie A, 1960–61 Coppa Italia, 1960–61 European Cup Winners' Cup	
2013	(Italy) Ardico Magnini	DF	1950–1958	241	6	1955–56 Serie A	
2013	(Italy) Alberto Orzan	DF	1954–1963	246	3	1955–56 Serie A, 1960–61 Coppa Italia, 1960–61 European Cup Winners' Cup	
2013	(Italy) Giuseppe Virgili	FW	1954–1958	115	62	1955–56 Serie A	
2013	(Brazil) Julinho	FW	1955–1958	98	23	1955–56 Serie A	
2014	(Italy) Armando Segato	MF	1952–1960	255	19	1955–56 Serie A	
2014	(Italy) Claudio Merlo	MF	1965–1976	377	28	1965–66 Coppa Italia, 1968–69 Serie A	
2014	(Italy) Renzo Contratto	MF	1980–1988	285	0	–	
2014	(Argentina) Gabriel Batistuta	FW	1991–2000	332	207	1993–94 Serie B, 1995–96 Coppa Italia, 1996 Supercoppa Italiana	
2015	(Italy) Rodolfo Volk	FW	1926–1927	14	11	–	
2015	(Italy) Sergio Cervato	DF	1948–1959	334	31	1955–56 Serie A	
2015	(Italy) Luciano Chiarugi	FW	1965–1972	193	56	1965–66 Coppa Italia, 1968–69 Serie A	
2015	(Italy) Francesco Toldo	GK	1993–2001	337	0	1993–94 Serie B, 1995–96 Coppa Italia, 1996 Supercoppa Italiana, 2000–01 Coppa Italia	
2016	(Italy) Romeo Menti	FW	1938–1941; 1945–1946	136	55	1938–39 Serie B, 1939–40 Coppa Italia	
2016	(Argentina) Miguel Montuori	MF	1956–1961	188	84	1955–56 Serie A, 1960–61 Coppa Italia, 1960–61 European Cup Winners' Cup	
2016	(Italy) Franco Superchi	GK	1965–1976	318	0	1965–66 Coppa Italia, 1968–69 Serie A, 1974–75 Coppa Italia	
2016	(Italy) Luca Toni	FW	2005–2007; 2012–2013	99	57	–	
2017	(Italy) Enzo Robotti	DF	1957–1965	273	2	1960–61 Coppa Italia, 1960–61 European Cup Winners' Cup	
2017	(Italy) Francesco Rosetta	DF	1957–1965	255	1	1955–56 Serie A	
2017	(Italy) Ugo Ferrante	DF	1963–1972	251	6	1965–66 Coppa Italia, 1968–69 Serie A	
2017	(Italy) Enrico Chiesa	FW	1999–2002	85	45	2000–01 Coppa Italia	
2017	(Brazil) Dunga	MF	1988–1992	154	12	2000–01 Coppa Italia	
2018	(Italy) Enrico Albertosi	GK	1958–1968	240	0	1960–61 Coppa Italia, 1960–61 European Cup Winners' Cup, 1965–66 Coppa Italia	
2018	(Italy) Davide Astori	DF	2015–2018	109	3	–	
2018	(Argentina) Daniel Bertoni	MF	1980–1984	123	31	–	
2018	(Italy) Giancarlo Galdiolo	DF	1970–1980	315	5	1974–75 Coppa Italia	
2018	(Italy) Mario Maraschi	FW	1967–1970	115	48	1968–69 Serie A	
2019	(Italy) Sergio Castelletti	DF	1958–1966	262	0	1960–61 Coppa Italia, 1960–61 European Cup Winners' Cup, 1965–66 Coppa Italia	
2019	(Italy) Moreno Roggi	DF	1972–1978	110	6	1974–75 Coppa Italia	
2019	(Italy) Francesco Graziani	FW	1981–1983	63	18	1974–75 Coppa Italia	
2022	(Italy) Sergio Carpanesi	MF	1955–1959	33	1	1955–56 Serie A	
2022	(Italy) Claudio Desolati	FW	1955–1959	200	58	1974–75 Coppa Italia	
2022	(Italy) Celeste Pin	DF	1982–1991	268	6	–	
2022	(France) Sébastien Frey	GK	2005–2011	218	0	–	
2023	(Italy) Guido Gratton	MF	1953–1960	215	31	1955–56 Serie A	
2023	(Italy) Salvatore Esposito	MF	1966–1972	158	8	1968–69 Serie A	
2023	(Italy) Angelo Di Livio	MF	1999–2005	213	8	2000–01 Coppa Italia	
2024	(Romania) Adrian Mutu	FW	2006–2011	143	70	–	
2024	(Italy) Maurilio Prini	FW	1952–1958	67	10	1955–56 Serie A	
2024	(Italy) Bernardo Rogora	DF	1965–1970	165	5	1965–66 Coppa Italia, 1968–69 Serie A	
2024	(Italy) Bruno Beatrice	MF	1973–1976	99	1	1974–75 Coppa Italia	

=== Coaches ===
Year	Name	Fiorentina career	Honours with Fiorentina	Ref.
2012	(Italy) Fulvio Bernardini	1953–1958	1955–56 Serie A	
2013	(Italy) Bruno Pesaola	1968–1971	1968–69 Serie A	
2014	(Italy) Mario Mazzoni	1974–1975; 1976–1977	1974–75 Coppa Italia	
2015	(Hungary) Károly Csapkay	1926–1930	–	
2019	(Italy) Emiliano Mondonico	2003–2004	–	
2022	(Italy) Claudio Ranieri	1993–1997	1993–94 Serie B, 1995–96 Coppa Italia, 1996 Supercoppa Italiana	

=== Executives ===
Year	Name	Notes	Ref.
2012	Raffaele Righetti	Historic secretary general of Fiorentina	
2012	Lando Parenti	Warehouse worker at the club	
2012	Egisto Pandolfini (Note: Egisto Pandolfini was also a player at Fiorentina from 1945 to 1946 and from 1948 to 1952.)	Creator of Fiorentina's youth system	
2012	Luigi Ridolfi Vay da Verrazzano	Founder of ACF Fiorentina	
2013	Enrico Befani	President of the club from 1952 to 1961	
2013	Ernesto Paroli	Warehouse worker at the club	
2014	Nello Baglini	President of the club from 1965 to 1971	
2015	Ugolino Ugolini	President of the club from 1971 to 1977	
2016	Ennio Raveggi	Masseur at the club	
2017	Sandro Mencucci	CEO and board director at the club	
2018	Ottavio Baccani (Note: Ottavio Baccani also managed Fiorentina during the 1937–38)	Sporting director at the club	
2019	Artemio Franchi	One of the first sporting directors at the club	
2023	Alberto Baccani	Athletic trainer at the club from 1960 to 2002	

=== Ambassadors ===
Year	Name	Notes	Ref.
2012	Rigoletto Fantappiè	Sporting director of the club and historic supporter	
2012	Stefano Biagini	Historic supporter	
2012	Narciso Parigi	Composer of Fiorentina's anthem	
2012	Franco Zeffirelli	Historic supporter	
2013	Valter Tanturli	Historic supporter	
2013	Mario Ciuffi	Historic supporter	
2014	Giorgio Albertazzi	Historic supporter	
2015	Paolo Valenti	Historic supporter	
2015	Carlino Mantovani	Florentine sports journalist	
2015	Luciano Artusi	Calcio Fiorentino historian	
2016	Giampiero Masieri	Florentine sports journalist	
2018	Luigi Boni	Historic supporter	
2019	Roberto Germogli	Photojournalist	
2022	Raffaello Paloscia	Sports journalist	
2024	Sandro Picchi	Sports journalist	

== See also ==
- List of ACF Fiorentina players
