= History of ACF Fiorentina =

This article covers the history of Italian football club ACF Fiorentina.

== Before Fiorentina ==
The first football society was founded in 1898 and was known as "Florence Football Club", an English name. This was common in that period as football was still very much an English game. This club was aristocratic. In 1902 a group of young people (among them Italo Capanni, Mario Meloni and a young man by the name of Galluzzo, who would in the future have a relative play for Fiorentina) founded another team, "Itala F.C.". The grounds were located in the Campo di Marte area. A year later in 1903, another club appeared, "Club Sportivo Firenze", initially dedicated only to cycling and other minor sports, but later including football. In 1908 a group of people including Oreste Gelli founded "Firenze Football Club", that played their matches at grounds called Prato del Quercione, at Parco delle Cascine. Finally, in 1910 "Palestra Ginnastica Fiorentina Libertas" (already founded in 1877 for other sports) was born from an internal split in "Firenze Football Club". The two clubs soon became rivals as they also shared the home ground divided only by a rope held by some wooden stakes. The members of Libertas were often referred to as "ghiozzi rossi", because they frequently had to jump into the ditch that bordered the field to pick up the ball. The word "ghiozzi" derives from a type of fish in the Florence area, and "rossi" referring to their scarlet shirts. They were evicted from Cascine and went to a new ground in Via Bellini, which opened on 22 April 1922.

== Foundation ==
Despite the foundation of many of clubs in Florence at this time, there were only two strong challengers: "Club Sportivo Firenze" and "Palestra Ginnastica Libertas". However, neither of them were able to challenge the bigger Italian clubs at the time. Out of necessity, the two clubs started to think about a merger, which would have been a big sacrifice for their identities, but the only way to have a strong enough club, both financially and in terms of quality. It's important to point out that this event was made easier by the rising fascist regime, which didn't like divisions in Italian cities, even in sport. In fact, many football clubs born in that period, such as Ambrosiana, Napoli, Roma and, of course, Fiorentina, were the result of mergers between existing urban clubs. In Fiorentina and Roma's case, the main authors of these mergers were Luigi Ridolfi Vay da Verrazzano and Italo Foschi, both provincial fascist leaders, while for Ambrosiana-Inter, the request was brought forward by Benito Mussolini himself.

On 3 July 1926 (7 July according to some sources) "PGF Libertas Firenze" played their last official match (last match of "Campionato Nazionale di II Divisione") against Prato with the following line-up: Sbrana, Farina, Posteiner, Barigozzi, Magnifico, Salvatorini, Mazzacurati, Focosi, Csapkay, Segoni II, Baldini. The final score was 1–1, with goals from Miliotti for "Lanieri" team and by Baldini for Florence side. The final standings saw Libertas reach the renewed "Second division" as reformed by FIGC

Thanks to PGF Libertas final position, Fiorentina could enter the new championship of "Prima Divisione" ("First Division"), the present-day Serie B.

Fiorentina was founded on 26 August 1926. The first chairman was the Marquis Luigi Ridolfi Vay da Verrazzano, who held that position for about fifteen years. The first trainer was Károly Csapkay.

The first match played by Fiorentina was against Signa, a small club from a nearby town which they lost 2–1. La Nazione, a Florence newspaper, stated: "Il debutto della squadra fiorentina che dovrà fra breve iniziare il campionato di prima divisione non è stato felice. I concittadini sono stati battuti da Le Signe per 2-1. L'A.C. Fiorentina ha avuto il torto di cominciare un po' tardi gli allenamenti della squadra. Ma la colpa non crediamo debba ascriversi del tutto gli intendimenti dei dirigenti del nuovo sodalizio calcistico...'"

First kit

Initially the club colours were white and red, the traditional colours of Florence. The home shirt were half red and white, while shorts and socks black. But in 1929 a mistake during the washing of a set jerseys given to Fiorentina by Colligiana meant the red dye ran into the white, creating a shade of purple. The colour was greeted well by the fans of the team, and it became the official team colour.

Three days after the defeat against "Le Signe", Fiorentina played another friendly against Sampierdarenese, drawing 2–2. The line-ups were:

- 1st half: Serravalli, Posteiner, Bargioni, Salvatorini, Segoni, Tuti, Focosi, Nichel, Bolteni (Wolk), Baccilieri, Bandini
- 2nd half: Sbrana, Posteiner, Benassi, Salvatorini, Longoni, Carulli, Baldini, Nichel, Bolteni (Wolk), Baccilieri, Bandini.

== Debut ==
=== Season 1926-27: the beginning ===
The team was admitted in group C (year 1926–27), and played its first match in an official competition on 3 October 1926, in a home match against the rival Pisa, ended with a victory for 3–1.
That championship for the yet "white-red" team was not that brilliant: they finished 6th over 10 teams; but it was a key season to settle the team
Among the players, one emerged more than others: Bolteni, that at the end of the season had scored 12 goals, becoming top scorer. In reality, his real name was Rodolfo Volk, born 1906, a blond man from Fiume who, enlisted in the military service, couldn't play without an authorization of authorities, which didn't grant the permission. He was therefore constrained to play with a fake name. Volk would become later an idol for Roma's fans.

== Season 1927-28: first place missed ==
The next year the team, always in "Prima Divisione", moved to easier Girone Sud ("Group South") reaching the second place at the end of the season only behind Bari. Fiorentina had won several matches: 3–0 against Tivoli, 5–1 against Savoia from Torre Annunziata, 8–0 against Tivoli (second leg), 1–1 against Taranto, 4–1 against Savoia (second leg). Despite seeming regular, the last match became object of inquest by FIGC. La Nazione stated: "possiamo dire che effettivamente, qualcosa di irregolare vi è stato nella disputa del match e si auspica un'inchiesta da parte della Federazione, che metta in chiaro le cose". The next verdict issued by FIGC was:

- Savoia would have offered money to Fiorentina to declare forfeit;
- Fiorentina had not charged the fact, with the discriminating of refusing the offer;
- Savoia would have reiterad the offer during the kick off, so that Savoia'd won the match;
- Fiorentina would have accepted to don't cash the federal indemnity, thus Savoia would commit to don't declare forfeit against Bari;
- Fiorentina did not charge the unfair behaviour of its manager;
- Fact's liability was to be assumed by Savoia's and Fiorentina's managers;
- Luigi Ridolfi and councillor Gino Agostini had to be excluded.

The provisions were those:

- Unfit for team's directors (Ridolfi and Agostini too);
- No points for teams regarding that match
- Sanction of 4500 liras for Savoia, 1000 liras for Fiorentina;

Last match against Bari was pivotal for the standing; Fiorentina played away and lost 5–3. During the match there were a lot of accidents, Fiorentina's player were abused and menaced by Bari's fans. The society made a claim but was repealed and they had to make with second place.

== 1928–29: a settlement season ==
Italian Football Association modified for 1928 season the structure of the highest championship because they wanted to create a unique round for Serie A: so they formed two rounds of 16 teams, from which the first eight would have joined Serie A the next year, and the following six Serie B. Fiorentina, inserted in Group B, ended the season in the last place with only 12 points and 5 matches won, 26 goals made and 96 suffered: only for a FIGC decision, it was re-admitted to Serie B for the next season, escaping from the relegation in Prima Divisione. The team was always trained by Capskay, but was joined by Gyula Feldmann, another Hungarian. Meucci, Luchetti e Checchi were Fiorentina players at that period. Fiorentina's goalkeeper, Pieri, was replaced by Sernagiotto after two dreadful performances: a 0–3 home defeat against Ambrosiana and a 0–11 away loss against Juventus in Turin.

The next week, however, Fiorentina played a remarkable match against one of the biggest Italian teams of the period, Genoa CFC, that lined up: De Prà, Lombardo, De Vecchi, Barbieri, Burlando, Parodi, Puerari, Bodini, Catto, Chiecchi, Rosso. Fiorentina scored the advantage goal in the first half with Pilati IV, but genoans won the match with two goals in the last three minutes. Fiorentina's fans protested against the referee, Mr. Galassi, blaming him of partiality. The situation became soon dangerous and Fiorentina's dirigents had to take the referee to the train station with their car, but the referee was anyway attacked. For this facts, Florence's home ground was banned for a match.

The following week wasn't anyway good: other two bad defeats against Napoli, 2–7, and SS Lazio, 0–4, on the neutral pitch of Modena.

== Historical view ==
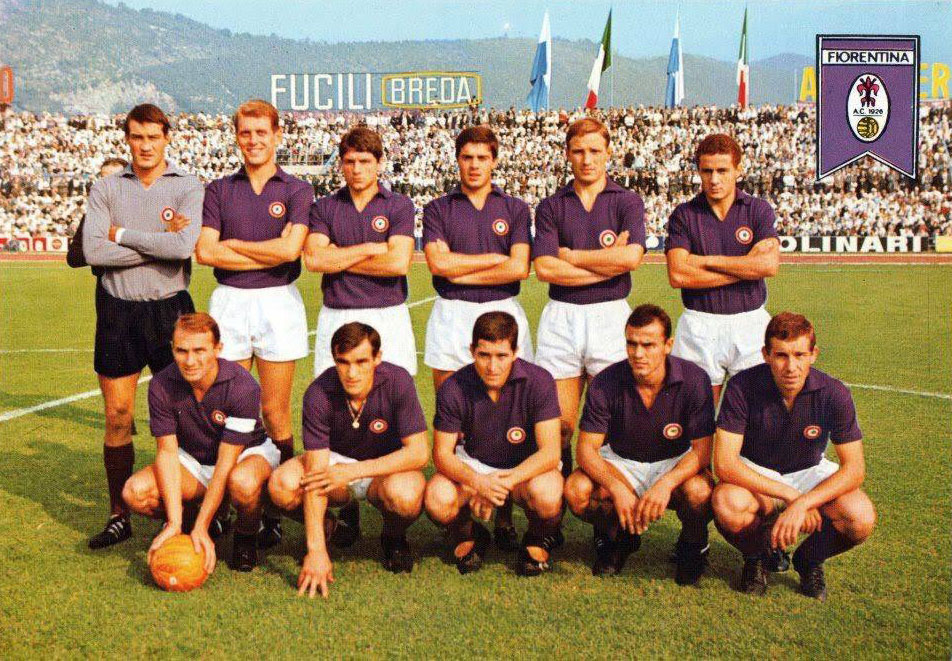
1966–67 Fiorentina team

The club won its first trophy in 1939–40 with the Coppa Italia and its first scudetto (Italian championship) in 1955–56, the club were runners-up in the four following seasons. In the 1960–61 season the club won the Coppa Italia again and was also successful in Europe, winning the first Cup Winners' Cup against Rangers.

In the 1960s the club won the Coppa Italia and the Mitropa Cup in 1966 and were league champions again in the 1968–69 season. In 1974 the Viola won the Anglo-Italian League Cup. Success in the Coppa Italia was repeated in 1975, but from then until the late 1990s the club found itself in the doldrums, culminating in a season in Serie B (second division) in 1993–1994. Upon return to Serie A the club again proved able in the cup competitions, winning the Coppa Italia again in 1996 and 2001 and the Italian SuperCoppa.

2001 heralded major changes for Fiorentina, as the terrible state of the club's finances was revealed; they were unable to pay wages and had debts of around US$50 million. The club owner, Vittorio Cecchi Gori, was able to raise some more money, but even this soon proved to be insufficient resources to sustain the club. Then, Fiorentina were relegated at the end of the 2001–02 season and went into judicially controlled administration in June 2002. This form of bankruptcy (sports companies cannot exactly fail in this way in Italy, but they can suffer a similar procedure) meant that the club was refused a place in Serie B for the 2002–03 season, and as a result, effectively ceased to exist.

In its place, Florence city council announced the creation of Fiorentina 1926 Florentia, with city mayor Leonardo Domenici as its first president. So the club was promptly re-established in August 2002 as Florentia Viola with a new owner, Diego Della Valle, and was admitted into Serie C2, the fourth tier of Italian football. The only player to remain at the club as they began their new life was Angelo Di Livio, whose commitment to the cause of resurrecting the club further endeared him to the fans. Helped by Di Livio, the club won its regional section in Serie C2 with considerable ease at the end of the 2002–03 season, which would normally have led to a promotion to Serie C1. However, due to the bizarre Caso Catania (Catania Case) the club skipped Serie C1 and was admitted into Serie B. This was only possible because the Italian Football Federation chose to resolve the Catania situation by increasing the number of teams in Serie B from 20 to 24. In the 2003 off-season, the club also bought back the right to use the Fiorentina name and the famous shirt design, and re-incorporated itself as ACF Fiorentina. Matches were still being played at the Artemio Franchi stadium.

The club's unusual double promotion was not without controversy, with some suggesting that Fiorentina did not deserve it; however, the club remained in Serie B and managed to finish the 2003–04 season in sixth place. This achievement placed the Viola in a two-legged playoff against Perugia (the 15th-place finisher in Serie A) for a position in Serie A. Fiorentina completed their remarkable comeback by winning the match 2–1 on aggregate, with both goals scored by Enrico Fantini, to gain promotion back to Serie A. In their first season back in Italian football's top flight, the club struggled to avoid relegation, securing survival only on the last day of the season, and avoiding a relegation playoff only on head-to-head record against Bologna and Parma.

In 2005–06, their form greatly improved, and they had qualified for the 3rd Qualifying round of the Champions League by earning the 4th place in the Serie A with 74 points. The combination of defence by captain Dario Dainelli and Czech international regular Tomáš Ujfaluši, midfield by Cristian Brocchi, wing by Martin Jorgensen, playmaking by Stefano Fiore and key marksman Luca Toni with Sebastian Frey as goalkeeper proved to be an outstanding force in Serie A. Fiorentina officially regained their status as an Italian elite, especially with Toni himself having scored an amazing 31 goals in just 34 appearances, the first player to pass the 30 goal mark since Antonio Valentin Angelillo in the 1958–59 season – which has seen him claim the European Golden Boot.

On 14 July 2006, Fiorentina were relegated to Serie B due to their involvement in the Calciopoli scandal and given a 12-point penalty. On appeal, the team was reinstated to the Serie A with a 19-point penalty for the 2006–07 season. The team also lost their UEFA Champions League 2006-07 place. After the start of the season, upon appealing to the Italian courts, Fiorentina's penalization was reduced to 15 points from 19, which was still far heavier than club officials had hoped for.

Despite starting the 2006–2007 season with the 15-point penalty, Fiorentina managed to secure a place in the 2007-2008 edition of the UEFA Cup. The combination of World Cup winner Luca Toni and Romanian international Adrian Mutu proved to be one of Serie A's most proficient strike partnerships, scoring 31 goals between them.

While many doubted the potential of the Viola in the 2007/2008 season due to Luca Toni's departure, Fiorentina had a sensational start to the season and had been tipped by Marcello Lippi and other prominent names in Calcio as surprise Scudetto challengers. However this form tailed off towards the middle of the season with various disappointing losses in connection with a grievous family loss suffered by the widely admired manager Cesare Prandelli, but Fiorentina still managed to take the fourth UEFA Champions League spot.
