= List of ACF Fiorentina players =

Below is a list of footballers who have played at least 100 matches for ACF Fiorentina.

In bold, players that still play for Fiorentina.

== List ==
Players are listed according to the date of their first-team debut for the club. Appearances and goals are for first-team official matches only. Substitute appearances included.

Name	Nationality	Position	Fiorentina career	Appearances	Goals	References
Renzo Magli	Italy	DF	1929–1939	212	0	
Mario Pizziolo	Italy	DF	1929–1936	203	3	
Bruno Ballante	Italy	GK	1930–1934	124	0	
Giuseppe Bigogno	Italy	MF	1931–1936	191	4	
Lorenzo Gazzari	Italy	DF	1931–1938	216	0	
Carlos Gringa	Uruguay	MF	1932–1936	104	25	
Luigi Griffanti	Italy	GK	1938–1946	168	0	
Giuseppe Chiappella	Italy	MF	1939–1949	345	5	
Renato Gei	Italy	MF	1941–1948	119	43	
Augusto Magli	Italy	MF	1941–1954	246	3	
Alberto Galassi	Italy	FW	1947–1952	137	63	
Egisto Pandolfini	Italy	FW	1948–1952	148	36	
Leonardo Costagliola	Italy	GK	1948–1955	230	0	
Francesco Rosetta	Italy	MF	1948–1957	255	1	
Sergio Cervato	Italy	DF	1948–1959	334	31	
Ardico Magnini	Italy	DF	1950–1958	241	6	
Armando Segato	Italy	DF	1952–1960	255	19	
Guido Gratton	Italy	DF	1953–1960	215	19	
Giuseppe Virgili	Italy	FW	1954–1958	115	62	
Alberto Orzan	Italy	DF	1954–1963	246	1	
Giuliano Sarti	Italy	GK	1954–1963	220	0	
Miguel Montuori	Argentina	MF	1956–1961	188	84	
Enzo Robotti	Italy	DF	1957–1965	273	2	
Francisco Lojacono	Argentina	MF	1957–1960	107	36	
Gianfranco Petris	Italy	FW	1958–1964	200	64	
Kurt Hamrin	Sweden	FW	1958–1967	362	208	
Enrico Albertosi	Italy	GK	1958–1968	240	0	
Sergio Castelletti	Italy	DF	1959–1966	262	0	
Giuseppe Brizi	Italy	DF	1961–1973	389	2	
Ugo Ferrante	Italy	DF	1963–1972	251	6	
Mario Bertini	Italy	MF	1964–1968	122	20	
Luciano Chiarugi	Italy	FW	1965–1972	193	56	
Claudio Merlo	Italy	MF	1965–1976	377	28	
Mario Maraschi	Italy	FW	1967–1970	115	48	
Franco Superchi	Italy	GK	1967–1976	318	0	
Giancarlo Galdiolo	Italy	DF	1970–1980	315	5	
Andrea Orlandini	Italy	MF	1971–1973; 1977–1982	195	5	
Domenico Caso	Italy	MF	1971–1978	192	35	
Claudio Desolati	Italy	FW	1972–1982	200	58	
Giancarlo Antognoni	Italy	MF	1972–1987	429	72	
Giovanni Galli	Italy	GK	1977–1986	323	0	
Renzo Contratto	Italy	DF	1980–1988	285	0	
Daniel Bertoni	Argentina	MF	1981–1984	123	31	
Daniele Massaro	Italy	FW	1981–1986	181	15	
Paolo Monelli	Italy	FW	1981–1987	165	40	
Daniel Passarella	Argentina	DF	1982–1986	139	35	
Stefano Carobbi	Italy	DF	1982–1989; 1991–1993	210	5	
Gabriele Oriali	Italy	MF	1983–1987	139	12	
Roberto Baggio	Italy	FW	1985–1990	136	55	
Sergio Battistini	Italy	DF	1985–1990	172	13	
Dunga	Brazil	MF	1988–1992	154	12	
Stefano Pioli	Italy	DF	1989–1995	172	1	
Gabriel Batistuta	Argentina	FW	1991–2000	333	207	
Francesco Baiano	Italy	FW	1992–1997	141	35	
Anselmo Robbiati	Italy	FW	1993–1999; 2001–2002	192	36	
Francesco Toldo	Italy	GK	1993–2001	337	0	
Rui Costa	Portugal	MF	1994–2001	276	50	
Sandro Cois	Italy	MF	1994–2002	218	9	
Luís Oliveira	Brazil; Belgium	FW	1996–1999	116	26	
Christian Amoroso	Italy	MF	1996–2002	154	3	
Tomáš Řepka	Czech Republic	DF	1998–2001	127	2	
Moreno Torricelli	Italy	DF	1998–2002	126	3	
Daniele Adani	Italy	DF	1999–2002	103	7	
Angelo Di Livio	Italy	MF	1999–2005	214	8	
Christian Riganò	Italy	FW	2002–2005	100	62	
Gianluca Comotto	Italy	DF	2003; 2008–2011	119	0	
Tomáš Ujfaluši	Czech Republic	DF	2004–2008	149	2	
Dario Dainelli	Italy	MF	2004–2010	171	8	
Martin Jørgensen	Denmark	MF	2004–2010	182	17	
Giampaolo Pazzini	Italy	FW	2005–2009	136	33	
Sébastien Frey	France	GK	2005–2011	218	0	
Alessandro Gamberini	Italy	DF	2005–2012	224	6	
Riccardo Montolivo	Italy	MF	2005–2012	261	19	
Manuel Pasqual	Italy	DF	2005–2016	356	10	
Massimo Gobbi	Italy	DF	2006–2010	111	2	
Adrian Mutu	Romania	FW	2006–2011	143	70	
Mario Santana	Argentina	FW	2006–2011	137	18	
Per Krøldrup	Denmark	DF	2006–2012	146	7	
Juan Manuel Vargas	Peru	FW	2008–2015	186	25	
Alberto Gilardino	Italy	FW	2008–2011	157	63	
Stevan Jovetić	Montenegro	FW	2008–2013	135	40	
Khouma Babacar	Senegal	FW	2009–2012; 2014–2018	128	39	
Neto	Brazil	GK	2011–2015	101	0	
Alberto Aquilani	Italy	MF	2012–2015	105	15	
David Pizarro	Chile	MF	2012–2015	111	4	
Juan Cuadrado	Colombia	FW	2012–2015	106	26	
Stefan Savić	Montenegro	DF	2012–2015	108	4	
Matías Fernández	Chile	MF	2012–2016	131	7	
Gonzalo Rodríguez	Argentina	DF	2012–2017	203	25	
Borja Valero	Spain	MF	2012–2017	212	17	
Josip Iličić	Slovenia	FW	2013–2017	137	37	
Ciprian Tătărușanu	Romania	GK	2014–2017	101	0	
Milan Badelj	Croatia	MF	2014–2018 2019–2020	140	6	
Davide Astori	Italy	DF	2015–2018	109	3	
Federico Chiesa	Italy	FW	2016–2022	153	34	
Marco Benassi	Italy	MF	2017–2020; 2021–2023	106	17	
**Cristiano Biraghi**	Italy	MF	2018–	260	15	
Dušan Vlahović	Serbia	FW	2018–2022	108	49	
Gaetano Castrovilli	Italy	MF	2019–2024	131	14	
Sofyan Amrabat	Morocco	MF	2020–2023	111	1	
Giacomo Bonaventura	Italy	MF	2020–2024	162	22	
Nicolás González	Argentina	FW	2021–2024	125	38	

== Key ==
- GK — Goalkeeper
- DF — Defender
- MF — Midfielder
- FW — Forward

Nationalities are indicated by the corresponding FIFA country code.

== See also ==
- ACF Fiorentina Hall of Fame
