= 1966 Coppa Italia final =

18th Coppa Italia final
- Event: 1965–66 Coppa Italia
Fiorentina	Catanzaro
2	1
- After extra time
- Date: 19 May 1966
- Venue: Stadio Olimpico, Rome
- Referee: Antonio Sbardella

The 1966 Coppa Italia final was the final of the 1965–66 Coppa Italia. The match was played on 14 June 1967 between Fiorentina and Catanzaro. Fiorentina won 2–1 after extra time.

== Match ==
19 May 1966

Fiorentina	2–1 (a.e.t.)	Catanzaro
Hamrin 30'; Bertini 119' (pen.)		Marchioro 47'

Stadio Olimpico, Rome
Referee: Antonio Sbardella

Fiorentina	Catanzaro

GK	1	(Italy) Enrico Albertosi
DF	2	(Italy) Giovan Battista Pirovano
DF	3	(Italy) Bernardo Rogora
DF	4	(Italy) Ugo Ferrante
DF	5	(Italy) Giuseppe Brizi
MF	6	(Italy) Mario Bertini
RW	7	(Sweden) Kurt Hamrin
AM	8	(Italy) Giancarlo De Sisti
AM	9	(Italy) Claudio Merlo
LW	10	(Italy) Mario Brugnera
CF	11	(Italy) Luciano Chiarugi
Manager:
(Italy) Giuseppe Chiappella

GK	1	(Italy) Umberto Provasi
DF	2	(Italy) Franco Marini
DF	3	(Italy) Edmondo Lorenzini
DF	4	(Italy) Cesare Maccacaro
DF	5	(Italy) Luigi Tonani
DF	6	(Italy) Luigi Sardei
MF	7	(Italy) Carlo Vanini
MF	8	(Italy) Giuseppe Marchioro
AM	9	(Italy) Gianni Bui
CF	10	(Italy) Alvaro Gasparini
AM	11	(Italy) Mario Tribuzio
Manager:
(Italy) Dino Ballacci
