= Stadio Velodromo Libertas =

Stadium in Florence, Italy

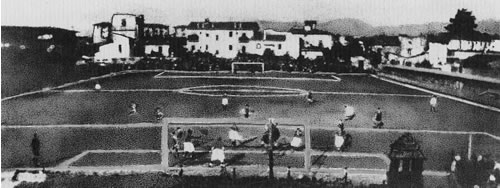
- Interactive map of Stadio Velodromo Libertas
- Location: Florence, Italy
- Capacity: 10,000

Construction
- Opened: 2 April 1922
- Demolished: 1950s

Tenants
- P.G. Libertas (1922–1926); ACF Fiorentina (1926–1931)

The Stadio Velodromo Libertas was a stadium in Florence, Italy, which was inaugurated on 2 April 1922.

The stadium was first used P.G. Libertas from 1922 to 1926, when the club merged with C.S. Firenze to form ACF Fiorentina. On 20 September 1926, the Stadio Velodromo Libertas became the first stadium in which Fiorentina ever played. The newly formed club played there from 1926 for five seasons, before moving to the current Stadio Artemio Franchi.

After Fiorentina moved away, the stadium was used by youth teams until World War II, when it was used as an air-raid shelter.

The stadium was demolished in the 1950s to allow for the building development of the area.
