= Mario Mazzoni =

Italian footballer and manager (1931–2019)

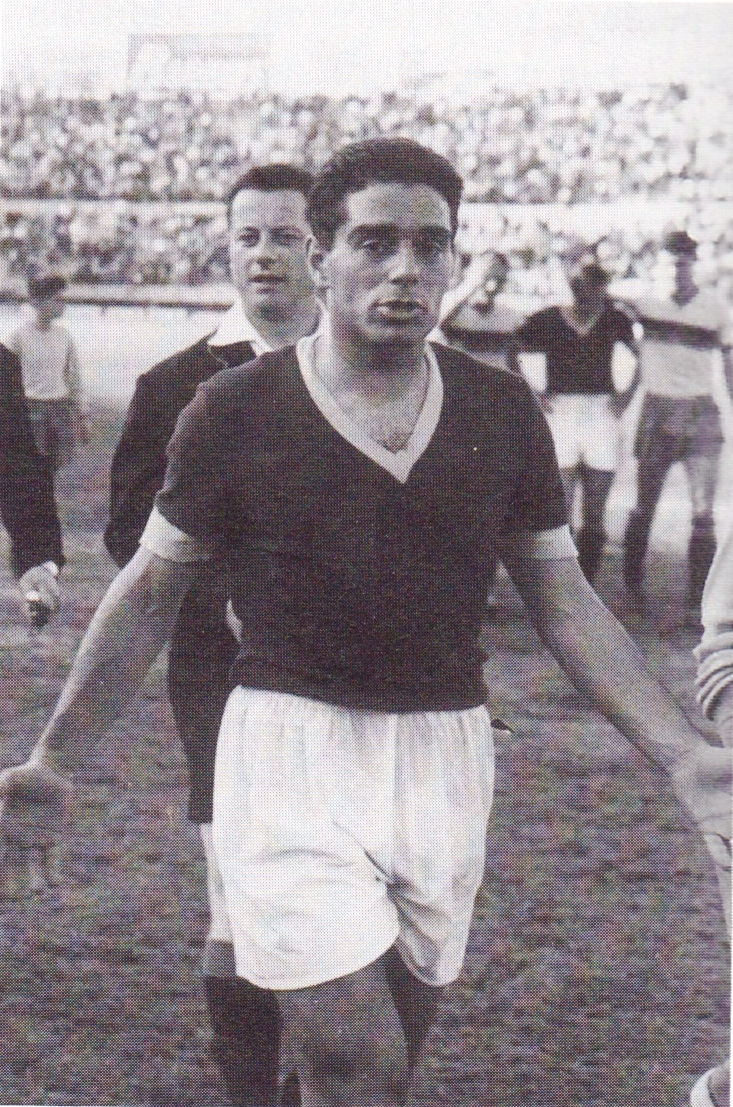

Personal information
- Date of birth: 29 March 1931
- Place of birth: Florence, Italy
- Date of death: 17 May 2019 (aged 88)
- Place of death: Florence, Italy
- Height: 1.68 m (5 ft 6 in)
- Position: Midfielder

Youth career
- Fiorentina

Senior career*
Years	Team	Apps	(Gls)
1948–1949	Le Signe	1	(0)
1949–1950	Siena	3	(0)
1950–1951	Le Signe	33	(2)
1951–1952	Empoli	4	(1)
1952–1953	Ascoli	24	(10)
1953–1963	Bari	313	(25)
1963–1964	Prato	25	(0)
1964–1965	Poggibonsi	20	(0)

Managerial career
- 1975: Fiorentina
- 1978–1979: Siena
- * Club domestic league appearances and goals

Mario Mazzoni (29 March 1931 – 17 May 2019) was a former Italian professional footballer and manager who played as a midfielder.

In 2014, he was inducted into ACF Fiorentina Hall of Fame.

== Career ==
=== Player ===
In his youth, Mazzoni played for Fiorentina, before playing for several other Tuscan teams such as Le Signe, Siena, and Empoli.

After one season at Ascoli, he was bought by Bari for the 1953–54 IV Serie, where he spent most of his career, becoming the captain and reaching Serie A in 1958. At Bari, he made a total of 313 appearances and scored 25 goals (of which 90 appearances and 7 goals in Serie A), becoming the third player with most appearances in the club's history.

He then spent one season at Prato during the 1963–64 Serie B, before ending his career at Poggibonsi after the 1964–65 Serie D season.

=== Manager ===
In 1970, Mazzoni was appointed as assistant coach of Fiorentina. At the end of the 1974–75 season, he replaced Nereo Rocco, who had quit his role of first team coach, leading the club to the victory of the 1974–75 Coppa Italia. He also led Siena during the 1978–79 Serie C2.

== Honours ==
=== Player ===
Bari

- IV Serie: 1953–54
- Serie C: 1954–55

=== Manager ===
Fiorentina

- Coppa Italia: 1974–75

=== Individual ===
- ACF Fiorentina Hall of Fame: 2014
