= Giuseppe Brizi =

Italian footballer and manager (1942–2022)

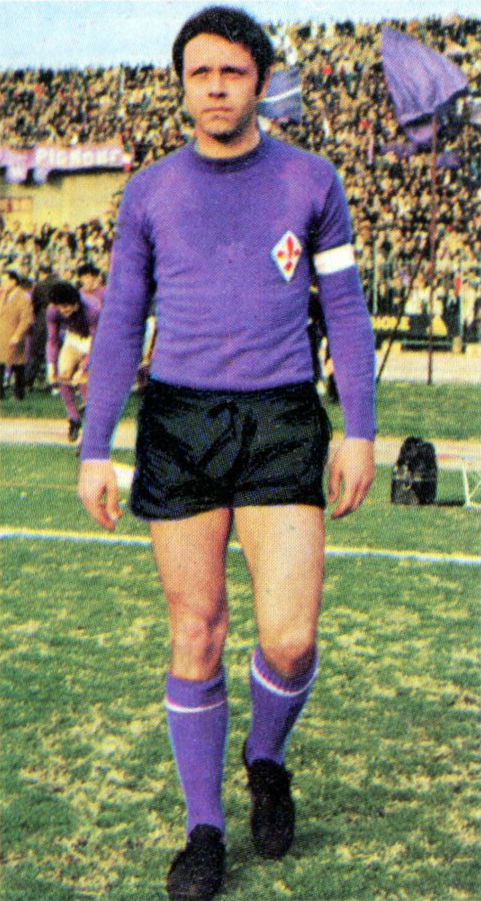
- Brizi captaining Fiorentina in 1974

Personal information
- Date of birth: 19 March 1942
- Place of birth: Macerata, Italy
- Date of death: 9 June 2022 (aged 80)
- Height: 1.76 m (5 ft 9 in)
- Position: Defender

Youth career
- Robur Macerata 1905
- Maceratese

Senior career*
Years	Team	Apps	(Gls)
1959–1962	Maceratese	62	(1)
1962–1976	Fiorentina	374	(2)
1976–1977	Maceratese	17	(0)
Total		453	(3)

Managerial career
- 1979–1981: Maceratese
- 1982–1983: Lanciano
- 1983–1984: Maceratese
- 1984–1986: Fermana
- 1992–1996: Sangiustese
- 1996–1997: Maceratese
- * Club domestic league appearances and goals

Giuseppe Brizi (19 March 1942 – 9 June 2022) was an Italian professional football player and manager who played as a defender. In 2012, he was inducted into ACF Fiorentina Hall of Fame.

== Playing career ==
Brizi debuted in professional football during the 1959–60 Serie C season, when he played as a midfielder for Maceratese. In 1962, he was then bought by Fiorentina, where Ferruccio Valcareggi eventually decided to play him as a sweeper. In Florence, Brizi had his best spell of his career, making 389 appearances (becoming the player with the second highest number of appearances in the history of the club) and contributing to winning, among others, one Scudetto and two Coppa Italia.

He was part of the Italy national B team's squad that won the 1963 Mediterranean Games.

== Managerial career ==
Brizi was the manager of Maceratese for three non-consecutive tenures, where he won his Girone during the 1979–80 Serie D season, Lanciano, Fermana, and Sangiustese.

== Death ==
Brizi died on 9 June 2022, at the age of 80.

== Honours ==
=== Player ===
Fiorentina

- Serie A: 1968–69
- Coppa Italia: 1965–66, 1974–75
- Anglo-Italian League Cup: 1975
- Mitropa Cup: 1966

Italy

- Mediterranean Games: 1963

=== Individual ===
- ACF Fiorentina Hall of Fame: 2012
