= Italo Bandini =

Italian footballer

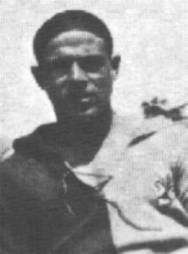

Personal information
- Date of birth: 15 April 1905
- Place of birth: Florence, Italy
- Date of death: 11 December 1978 (aged 73)
- Position: Winger

Senior career*
| Years | Team | Apps | (Gls) |
- C.S. Firenze
| 1926–1927 | Fiorentina | 16 | (0) |
| 1928–1930 | Fiorentina | 14 | (4) |
| 1930–1931 | Giovanni Berta | | |
| 1931–1932 | Montevarchi | | |
- * Club domestic league appearances and goals

Italo Bandini (15 April 1905 – 11 December 1978) was an Italian former professional footballer who played as a winger.

In 2013, he was inducted into ACF Fiorentina Hall of Fame.

== Career ==
He was bought from C.S. Firenze by Fiorentina to play the very first season of the newly formed club. He became the first player in the history of Fiorentina to get a red card. Baldini was sold after just one season, before being bought again in 1928.

Bandini then moved to Gruppo Sportivo Giovanni Berta in 1930 and Montevarchi in 1931.

== Honours ==
=== Individual ===
- ACF Fiorentina Hall of Fame: 2013
