= Bernardo Rogora (footballer) =

Italian footballer (1938–2026)

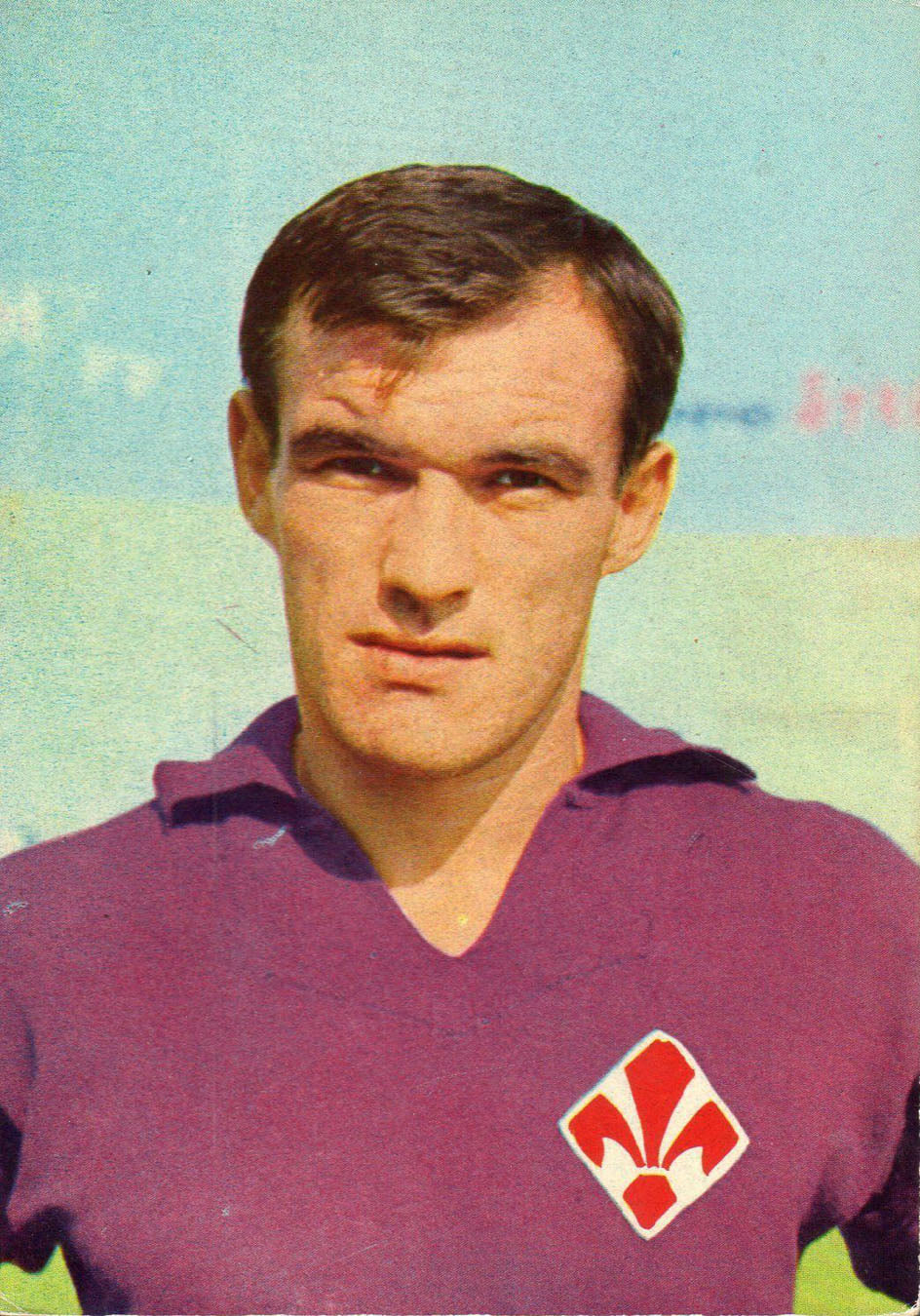
- Rogora with Fiorentina in 1966

Personal information
- Date of birth: 8 November 1938
- Place of birth: Solbiate Olona, Italy
- Date of death: 4 November 2026 (aged 87)
- Height: 1.75 m (5 ft 9 in)
- Position: Left-back

Youth career
- Pro Patria

Senior career*
Years	Team	Apps	(Gls)
1959–1960	Pro Patria		
1952–1954	Gallarate		
1962–1965	Padova	95	(1)
1965–1970	Fiorentina	123	(3)
1970–1973	Brescia	82	(1)
1973–1975	Salernitana	44	(0)
- * Club domestic league appearances and goals

Bernardo Rogora (8 November 1938 – 4 November 2026) was an Italian professional footballer who played as a left-back.

== Career ==
In his youth, Rogora played for Pro Patria.

After playing for Pro Patria, Gallarate, and Padova, he was signed by Fiorentina in 1965, where he established himself as a starter for the team that won the 1968–69 Serie A.

In 2024, he was inducted into ACF Fiorentina Hall of Fame.

== Death ==
Rogora died on 4 November 2026, at the age of 87.

== Honours ==
Fiorentina

- Coppa Italia: 1965–66
- Serie A: 1968–69

Individual

- ACF Fiorentina Hall of Fame: 2024
