= Carlo Petrini (footballer) =

Italian footballer and coach (1948–2012)

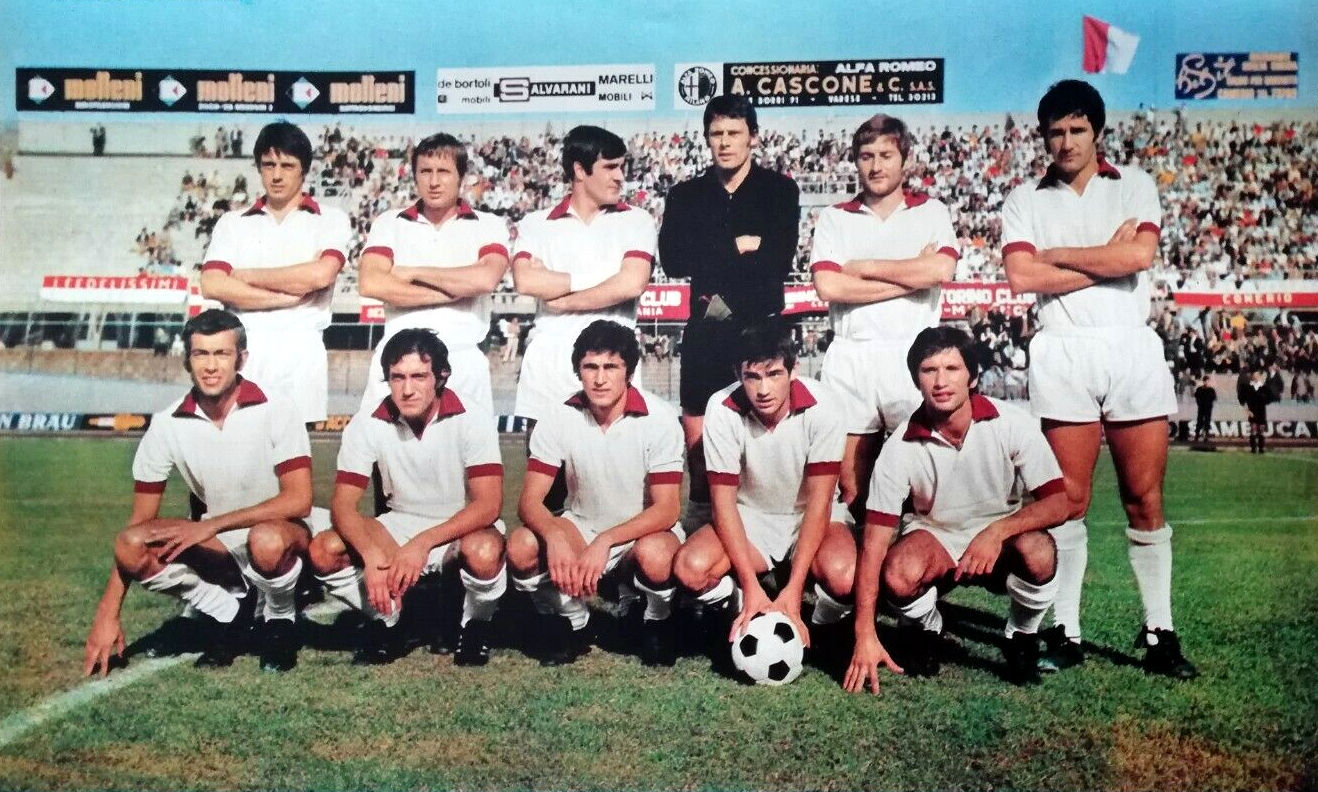
- Carlo Petrini (standing up, first from right) with Torino

Personal information
- Date of birth: 29 March 1948
- Place of birth: Monticiano, Italy
- Date of death: 16 April 2012 (aged 64)
- Place of death: Lucca, Italy
- Height: 1.80 m (5 ft 11 in)
- Position: Striker

Senior career*
Years	Team	Apps	(Gls)
1964–1968	Genoa	58	(9)
1965–1966	→ Lecce (loan)	20	(3)
1968–1969	Milan	9	(2)
1969–1971	Torino	17	(1)
1971–1972	Varese	19	(5)
1972–1974	Catanzaro	71	(22)
1974–1975	Ternana	21	(3)
1975–1976	Roma	24	(6)
1976–1977	Verona	17	(2)
1977–1979	Cesena	50	(10)
1979–1980	Bologna	5	(0)
1980–1982	banned		
1982–1983	Savona	26	(7)
1983–1984	Cuneo	21	(7)
1984–1985	Rapallo Ruentes		

Managerial career
- 1985–1986: Rapallo Ruentes
- * Club domestic league appearances and goals

Carlo Petrini (29 March 1948 – 16 April 2012) was an Italian professional football player and coach.

== Playing career ==
Petrini played as a striker in the Italian Serie A for eight seasons (112 games, 19 goals), representing AC Milan, Torino, Varese, Ternana, Roma, Hellas Verona and Bologna.

His career almost ended after he received a three-year and six-month ban from football in the Totonero 1980 match-fixing scandal. After 1982, he played for a few more seasons.

== After retirement ==
After ending his career in football in the mid-eighties, Petrini devoted himself to business, for a time managing his own finance company. After initial success, the business was affected by the accumulation of debts to moneylenders. To escape his creditors, Petrini left Italy and took refuge in France, where he lived for several years in complete anonymity.

Petrini's name came back to the headlines in 1995. His 19-year-old son, Diego, was dying from a brain tumour in the Galliera hospital in Genoa, and he launched an appeal through the media, asking to see his father, whom he had not heard from for the past six years. Diego, a promising footballer, died without seeing Petrini, who had decided not to return to Italy. Petrini later wrote a touching book of poetry inspired by this sad story after his final return to Italy in 1998.

Carlo Petrini, who resided in his native Monticiano, had been affected for some time by a severe form of glaucoma, which had caused almost complete blindness in his left eye and serious impairment of the right. According to the doctors who had cared for him over the years, and put him through five surgeries, the disease could be related to the usage of many performance-enhancing drugs during his career.

=== Books ===
In 2000, Petrini published his autobiography, Nel fango del dio pallone (In the Mud of Holy Football), in which he narrates in first person several events he witnessed, or was involved in, in the Italian football world. Petrini states in particular that the practice of doping in the sixties and seventies was rampant, and he claims to have used it multiple times, aided and abetted by sports doctors. He also tells about having been involved in or having witnessed cases of match-fixing.

Petrini subsequently published another book, 'Il calciatore suicidato' (The Suicided Footballer), where he personally investigated the mysterious death of Donato Bergamini, a player for Cosenza, who was found dead in 1989 on Route 106 near Roseto Capo Spulico. Despite the courts ruling the death a suicide, Petrini argued that the death of the footballer had occurred at the hands of local criminals.

Petrini went on to publish six more books, the last of which is titled Lucianone da Monticiano, (2012), and is a biography of football manager Luciano Moggi.

=== Involvement in civil society ===
Petrini continued to rally against the usage of performance-enhancing drugs, showing concern especially for the spread of doping practices among the young. He said: "A recent survey has shown that one teenager in three is willing to make use of illegal drugs while achieving success in the world of football. What is even more disturbing is that 10% of them declare themselves 'ready to die for use of doping', just to look like their sports idol."

In 2006, along with other former players, Petrini joined the Association of Victims of Doping (Associazione Vittime del Doping) founded by Claudia Beatrice, daughter of Bruno Beatrice, a former Fiorentina midfielder who died of leukaemia in 1987 at just 39 years.

== Honours ==
=== Player ===
Milan

- European Cup winner: 1968–69.

Torino

- Coppa Italia winner: 1970–71.

== Bibliography ==
- Petrini, Carlo (2000). Nel Fango del dio pallone. Kaos Edizioni. ISBN 88-7953-088-7.
- Petrini, Carlo (2001). Il calciatore suicidato. Kaos Edizioni. ISBN 88-7953-102-6.
- Petrini, Carlo (2003). I pallonari. Kaos Edizioni. ISBN 88-7953-116-6.
- Petrini, Carlo (2004). Senza maglia e senza bandiera. Kaos Edizioni. ISBN 88-7953-136-0.
- Petrini, Carlo (2005). Scudetti dopati. Kaos Edizioni. ISBN 88-7953-146-8.
- Petrini, Carlo (2006). Le corna del diavolo. Kaos Edizioni. ISBN 88-7953-154-9.
- Petrini, Carlo (2007). Calcio nei coglioni. Kaos Edizioni. ISBN 978-88-7953-173-3.
- Petrini, Carlo (2012). Lucianone da Monticiano. Kaos Edizioni. ISBN 978-88-7953-237-2.
