= Bruno Beatrice =

Italian footballer (born 1934)

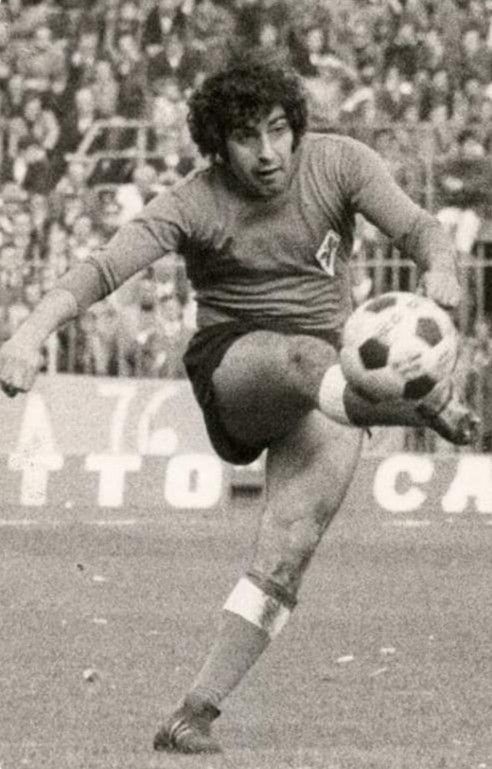
- Bruno Beatrice in the 1974–75 season at Fiorentina.

Personal information
- Date of birth: 5 March 1948 (age 78)
- Place of birth: Milan, Italy
- Date of death: 16 December 1987 (aged 39)
- Place of death: Arezzo, Italy
- Height: 1.72 m (5 ft 8 in)
- Position: Midfielder

Youth career
- Inter Milan

Senior career*
Years	Team	Apps	(Gls)
1969–1971	Solbiatese		
1971–1972	Arezzo	35	(0)
1972–1973	Ternana	25	(2)
1973–1976	Fiorentina	72	(1)
1976–1977	Cesena	44	(0)
1978–1981	Taranto	78	(3)
1981–1983	Siena		
- * Club domestic league appearances and goals

Bruno Beatrice (5 March 1948 – 16 December 1987) was an Italian professional footballer who played as a midfielder.

== Career ==
In his youth, Beatrice played for Inter Milan.

After playing for Solbiatese, Arezzo, and Ternana, he was signed by Fiorentina in 1973, where he won the 1974–75 Coppa Italia.

Beatrice died at the young age of 39 due to acute lymphoblastic leukemia. In 2024, he was inducted into ACF Fiorentina Hall of Fame.

== Honours ==
Fiorentina

- Coppa Italia: 1974–75

Individual

- ACF Fiorentina Hall of Fame: 2024
