= Moreno Roggi =

Italian footballer (born 1954)

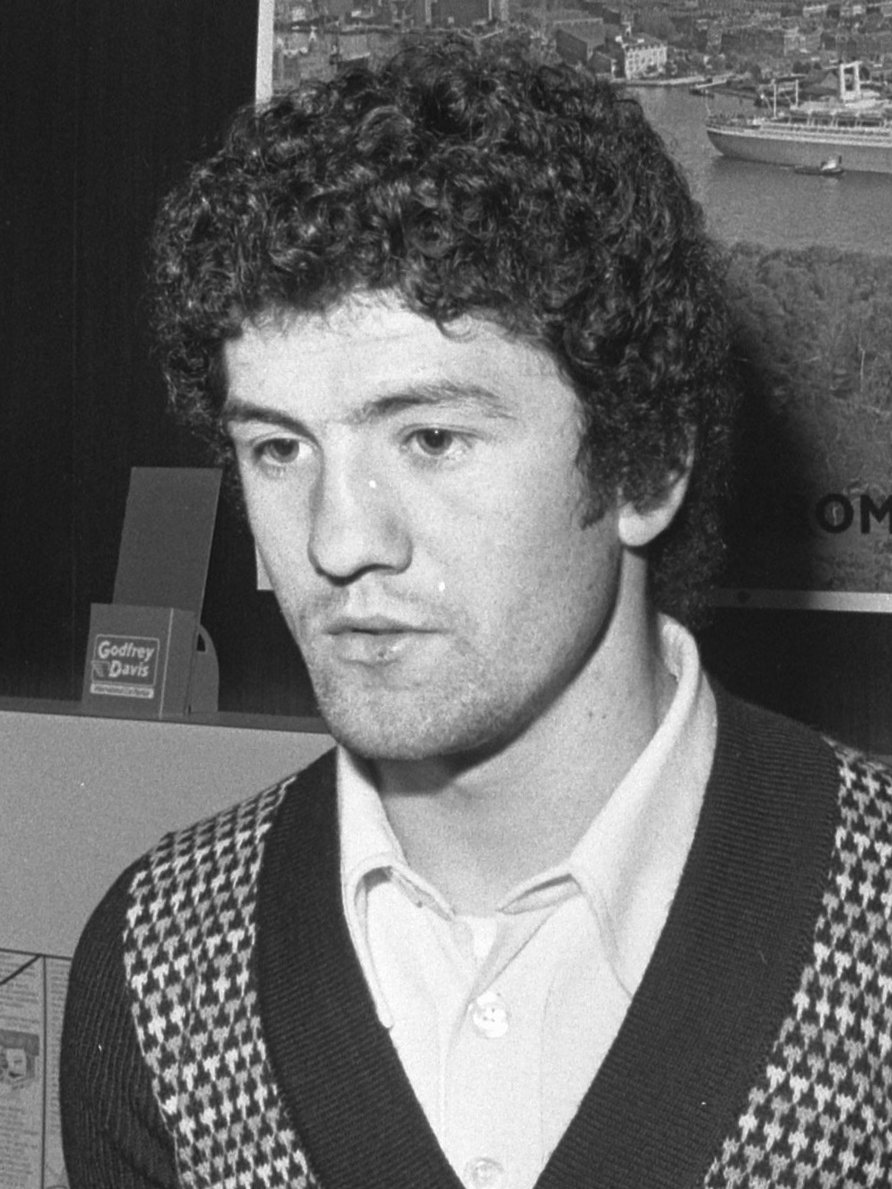

Personal information
- Full name: Moreno Roggi
- Date of birth: 24 March 1954 (age 72)
- Place of birth: San Miniato, Italy
- Position: Defender

Senior career*
| Years | Team | Apps | (Gls) |
| 1970–1972 | Empoli | 17 | (0) |
| 1972–1978 | Fiorentina | 82 | (4) |
| 1978–1979 | Avellino | 9 | (0) |

International career
| 1974–1976 | Italy | 7 | (0) |
- * Club domestic league appearances and goals

Moreno Roggi (Italian pronunciation: [moˈrɛːno ˈroddʒi]; born 24 March 1954) is an Italian footballer who played as a defender. He played for the Italy national football team seven times, the first being on 28 September 1974, the occasion of a friendly match against Yugoslavia in a 1–0 away loss.

== Honours ==
=== Player ===
Fiorentina

- Coppa Italia: 1974–75
