= Claudio Desolati =

Italian footballer (born 1955)

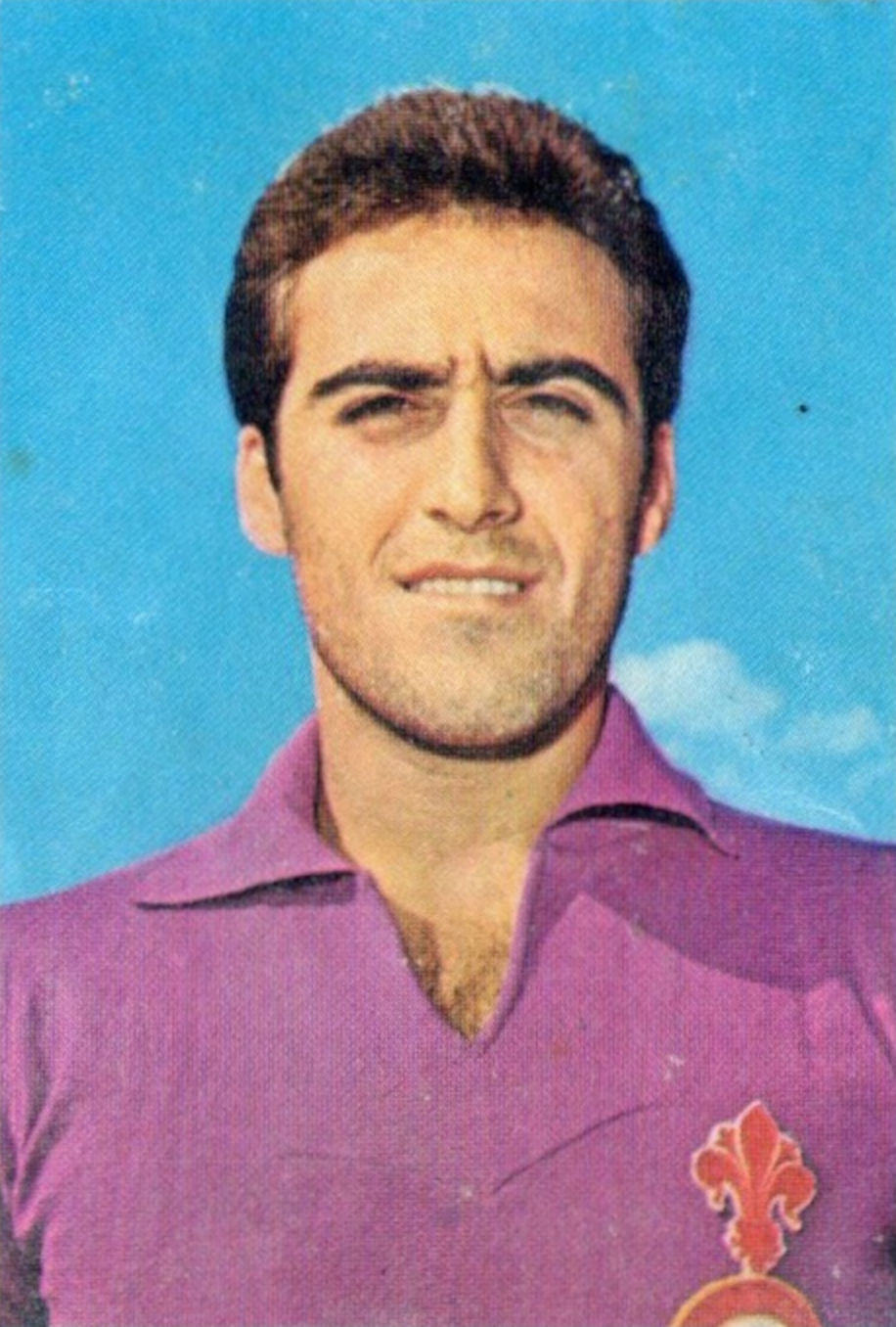
- Desolati with Fiorentina in 1975

Personal information
- Date of birth: 4 January 1955 (age 71)
- Place of birth: Genk, Belgium
- Height: 1.72 m (5 ft 8 in)
- Position: Forward

Youth career
- 1969–1971: Genoa

Senior career*
Years	Team	Apps	(Gls)
1971	Genoa	0	(0)
1971–1981	Fiorentina	152	(43)
1981–1982	Pistoiese	37	(9)
1982–1984	Foggia	49	(10)
1984–1985	Siena	31	(2)
1985–1987	Imperia	48	(17)
1987	Castelfiorentino	8	(0)
1988	Imperia	1	(0)
- * Club domestic league appearances and goals

Claudio Desolati (born 24 January 1955) is a former Italian professional footballer who played as a forward.

== Career ==
In his youth, Desolati played for Genoa.

In 1971, he was bought by Fiorentina, where he spent ten seasons, winning the 1974–75 Coppa Italia.

He then played for Pistoiese, Foggia, Siena, Imperia, and Castelfiorentino.

In 2022, he was inducted into ACF Fiorentina Hall of Fame.

== Honours ==
Fiorentina

- Coppa Italia: 1974–75

Individual

- ACF Fiorentina Hall of Fame: 2022
