= 1953–54 IV Serie =

Fourth Italian football championship

The IV Serie 1953-1954 was the second edition of the semi-professional competition of the present-day Serie D.

== Rules ==
Eight geographical championships. In each group: first team qualified to the finals, last two team relegated (special rule to expand the league).
Finals: two groups, North and South. In each final group: two promoted teams and two eliminated.

== Group A (North-West) ==
   Squadra                    Punti
 1. Aosta                      40               To the finals (tiebreaker)
 2. Biellese                   40
 3. Pro Vercelli               36
 4. Cuneo                      36
 5. Arsenal Spezia             33
 6. Borgosesia                 30
 7. Sestrese                   30
 8. Massese                    30
 9. Casale                     30
10. Valenzana                  29
11. Saluzzo                    27
12. Fossanese                  26
13. Rivarolese                 26 
14. Rapallo Ruentes            24 
15. Sestri Levante             22                Relegated to Promozione
16. Albenga                    21                Relegated to Promozione

== Group B (Lombardy) ==
   Squadra                    Punti
 1. Verbania                   41              To the Finals 
 2. Snia Viscosa Varedo        40 
 3. Vigevano	               38
 4. Pro Sesto	               35
 5. Gallaratese  	       35
 6. Meda                       33
 7. Saronno                    31
 8. Mariano                    30
 9. Magenta                    28
10. L. Manara Barzanò          28
11. Pro Lissone                27
12. Rhodense Calcistica        26
13. Villasanta A. Sala         25
14. Abbiategrasso              24
15. Varese                     23              Relegated to Promozione
16. Gravellona 	              16              Relegated to Promozione

== Group C (Middle North) ==
   Squadra                    Punti
 1. Cremonese                  45              To the Finals 
 2. Marzoli Palazzolo          43
 3. Reggiana                   36
 4. Falk Vobarno               32
 5. Cerea                      30
 6. Ponte San Pietro           30
 7. Hellas                     29
 8. Legnago                    29
 9. Olympia Caravaggio         29
10. Carpi                      29
11. Adriese                    29
12. Casalese                   26
13. Marzotto Manerbio          25
14. Fidenza                    25
15. A.C. Ferrara               24                Relegated to Promozione
16. Crema                      21                Relegated to Promozione

== Group D (North-East) ==
   Squadra                    Punti
 1. Bolzano                    47              To the Finals 
 2. Mestrina                   38
 3. Sacilese                   34
 4. Pordenone                  34
 5. Dolo 1909                  34
 6. Schio                      33
 7. Trento                     31
 8. SAICI Torviscosa           31
 9. Portogruaro                29
10. Olympia Cittadella         27
11. Belluno                    27
12. Lancia Bolzano             25
13. CRDA Monfalcone            24
14. San Giovanni Trieste       23
15. Pro Gorizia (T)                23                Re-elected (tiebreaker)
16. Libertas Trieste           20                Relegated to Promozione

== Group E (Tuscany and more) ==
   Squadra                    Punti
 1. Prato                      44              To the Finals 
 2. Perugia                    41                
 3. Sansepolcro                40
 4. Rosignano Solvay           35
 5. Pistoiese                  32
 6. Cecina                     32
 7. Faenza                     32
 8. Città di Castello          30
 9. Foligno                    30
10. Forlì                      28
11. Siena                      27
12. Minatori Perticara         26
13. Grosseto                   23                
14. Le Signe                   23                
15. Pontedera                  20                Relegated to Promozione
16. Cesena                     15                Relegated to Promozione

== Group F (Very Centre) ==
   Squadra                    Punti
 1. BPD Colleferro             45              To the Finals 
 2. Chinotto Neri Casilina     40
 3. Pescara                    39
 4. Ascoli                     33
 5. Sanlorenzoartiglio         31
 6. Sangiorgese                31
 7. L'Aquila                   30
 8. Anconitana                 28
 9. Fabriano                   28
10. Chieti                     28
11. Sora                       27
12. Romulea Roma               27
13. Castelfidardo              26
14. Fermana                    25
15. Sulmona                    25                Relegated to Promozione (tiebreaker)
16. Vigor Senigallia           17                Relegated to Promozione

== Group G (Middle South) ==
   Squadra                    Punti
 1. Foggia                     42              To the Finals 
 2. CRAL Cirio                 40
 3. Avellino                   34
 4. Sassari Torres             33
 5. Turris                     32
 6. Montevecchio               31
 7. Monteponi Iglesias         31
 8. Monticchio Potenza         30
 9. ILVA Bagnolese             29
10. Puteolana                  28
11. Cavese                     28
12. Frosinone                  26
13. Terracina                  26
14. Campobasso                 26
15. Nocerina                   25                Relegated to Promozione
16. Olbia                      19                Relegated to Promozione

== Group H (Far South) ==
   Squadra                    Punti
 1.  Bari                      48               To the Finals 
 2.  Enna                      40
 3.  Reggina                   35
 4.  Molfetta                  34
 5.  Trapani                   32
 6.  Nissena                   31
 7.  Marsala                   31
 8.  Trani                     31
 9.  Cosenza                   31
 10. Cerignola                 30
 11. Crotone                   28
 12. Matera                    27
 13. Brindisi                  26
 14. Paolana                   26
 15. Gela                      21               Relegated to Promozione
 16. Ostuni                    08               Relegated to Promozione

== The Finals ==
=== North ===
   Squadra                    Punti
 1. CREMONESE                   7              Promoted to Serie C
 2. Bolzano                     7              Promoted
    Aosta                       6
    Verbania                    4

=== South ===
   Squadra                    Punti
 1. Bari                        8+3             Promoted to Serie C
 2. Prato                       8+3             Promoted
 3. BPD Colleferro              8+0
 4. Foggia                      0

== Championship ==
Cremonese-BARI 2-2; 0–2

== References and sources ==
- Almanacco Illustrato del Calcio - La Storia 1898-2004, Panini Edizioni, Modena, September 2005

Specific
