= Giancarlo Galdiolo =

Italian footballer and manager

Personal information
- Date of birth: 4 November 1948
- Place of birth: Villafranca Padovana
- Date of death: 8 September 2018 (aged 69)
- Place of death: Castrocaro Terme e Terra del Sole
- Position: Defender

Youth career
- Padova

Senior career*
Years	Team	Apps	(Gls)
1967–1968	Padova	0	(0)
1968–1969	San Donà	33	(0)
1969–1970	Almas	27	(0)
1970–1980	Fiorentina	229	(3)
1980–1982	Sampdoria	39	(3)
1982	Bologna	1	(0)
1982–1984	Forlì	43	(3)
Total		372	(9)

International career
1971	Italy U23	2	(0)

Managerial career
- 1987–1988: Rimini
- 1989–1990: Forlì
- * Club domestic league appearances and goals

Giancarlo Galdiolo (4 November 1948 – 8 September 2018) was an Italian professional football manager and player who played as a right back.

== Playing career ==
Galdiolo played for Fiorentina between 1970 and 1980, winning the Coppa Italia title and an Anglo-Italian League Cup in 1975, collecting 229 league appearances and scoring 3 goals. He subsequently also spent two seasons with Sampdoria between 1980 and 1982. In total, he collected 223 Serie A appearances throughout his club career, and he retired from professional football in 1984, after two seasons with Forlì.

At international level, he represented the Italy under-23 side on two occasions in 1971.

== Coaching career ==
After retiring, Galdiolo served as a coach with Forlì and Rimini.

== Style of play ==
Galdiolo was a large, physically strong, tough, and hard-tackling yet fair man-marking right-back or centre-back (also known as "stopper", in Italian), with excellent stamina. Due to his correct behaviour, he was nicknamed "The Gentle Giant" throughout his career, as well as "Badile" ("Shovel", in Italian) – due to his physique –, and "Pappa", due to his resemblance to the Italian television star Peppino "Pappagone" De Filippo.

== Personal life ==
Galdiolo was married to Maria Rosa; together, they had three children: Alessandro, Alberto e Eleonora.

== Death ==
Galdiolo died on 8 September 2018 in his home in Castrocaro Terme e Terra del Sole, after a long illness. He had been suffering from a serious injury since 2010, a frontal temporal lobe dementia.

== Honours ==
=== Club ===
Fiorentina

- Coppa Italia: 1974–75
- Anglo-Italian League Cup: 1975

=== Individual ===
- Fiorentina Hall of Fame: 2018
