= Károly Csapkay =

Hungarian footballer and manager

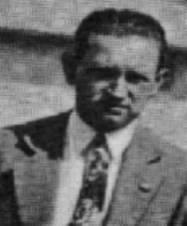

Personal information
- Date of birth: 29 May 1894
- Place of birth: Budapest, Hungary
- Date of death: 1 March 1966 (aged 71)

Senior career*
Years	Team	Apps	(Gls)
1925–1926	Libertas Firenze		
1926–1930	Fiorentina		

Managerial career
- 1926–1930: Fiorentina
- 1930–?: Aquila Montevarchi
- 1932–1934: Triestina
- 1934–1935: Palermo
- 1935–1936: Napoli
- 1936–1937: Palermo
- 1937–1938: Venezia
- 1938–1939: Pisa
- 1939–1942: Diósgyőri MÁVAG
- 1945–1946: MTK Budapest FC
- * Club domestic league appearances and goals

Károly Csapkay (29 May 1894 – 1 March 1966) commonly known as Karl Csapkay, was a Hungarian football player and manager from Budapest. As a player, he featured for Fiorentina before going on to manage several teams.
