= Luigi Ridolfi Vay da Verrazzano =

Italian politician and entrepreneur (1895–1958)

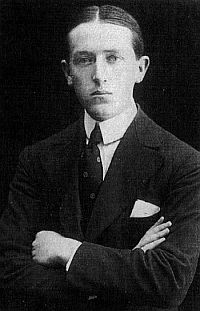
- Luigi Ridolfi Vay da Verrazzano in 1914
- Born: 7 November 1895; Florence, Italy
- Died: 31 May 1958 (aged 62); Padua, Italy
- Occupations: Entrepreneur, politician, sporting director
- Known for: Founder of ACF Fiorentina

Luigi Ridolfi Vay da Verrazzano (7 November 1895 – 31 May 1958) was an Italian politician, entrepreneur, and sporting director, founder and first chairman of ACF Fiorentina in 1926.

== Life and career ==
Luigi Ridolfi was born into one of the oldest noble families in Florence. He participated in the World War I, and he was awarded a Silver Medal of Military Valor.

He joined the National Fascist Party in 1921, actively participating in squad actions and the March on Rome as a deputy commander.

Parallel to his political involvement, starting from the 1920s, he pioneeringly engaged in sports at different levels. He founded ACF Fiorentina and contributed to the construction of the Stadio Giovanni Berta in Florence, which later became known as the Stadio Artemio Franchi, as well as the Centro Tecnico Federale di Coverciano. He was the chairman of Fiorentina for 16 years, winning the 1939–40 Coppa Italia.

He was elected as a deputy to the Chamber of Deputies in 1929 and 1934.

In 2012, he was inducted into ACF Fiorentina Hall of Fame.
