= Renzo Magli =

Italian footballer (born 1908)

Personal information
- Date of birth: 12 September 1908
- Place of birth: Bologna, Italy
- Date of death: 15 July 1981 (aged 72)
- Place of death: Florence, Italy
- Position: Defender

Youth career
- Molinella

Senior career*
Years	Team	Apps	(Gls)
- Modena
1929–1939	Fiorentina	202	(0)

Managerial career
- 1947: Fiorentina
- 1949–1950: Empoli
- 1951–1953: Fiorentina
- 1953–1955: Modena
- 1955–1958: Genoa
- 1958–1959: Taranto
- 1959–1960: Modena
- 1961: Taranto
- * Club domestic league appearances and goals

Renzo Magli (12 September 1908 – 15 July 1981) was an Italian football player and manager who played as a defender.

== Career ==
=== Player ===
He was bought by Fiorentina from Modena during the 1929–30 season. He made 212 appearances with the Florentine club, 142 of which were in Serie A.

=== Manager ===
He was the manager of Fiorentina, Empoli, Modena, Genoa, and Taranto.

== Honours ==
=== Player ===
Fiorentina

- Serie B: 1938–39
