= Giacomo Libera =

Italian footballer

Personal information
- Date of birth: 7 October 1951 (age 75)
- Place of birth: Varese, Italy
- Height: 1.79 m (5 ft 10 1/2 in)
- Positions: Striker; midfielder

Senior career*
Years	Team	Apps	(Gls)
1969–1970	Varese	0	(0)
1970–1971	Verbania	29	(3)
1971–1972	Como	13	(1)
1972–1975	Varese	55	(13)
1975–1977	Internazionale	33	(6)
1977–1978	Atalanta	14	(3)
1978–1979	Foggia	32	(13)
1979–1983	Bari	22	(6)
- * Club domestic league appearances and goals

Giacomo Libera (born 7 October 1951 in Varese) is a retired Italian professional footballer who played as a forward or midfielder.
