= PG Libertas =

Italian football club

P.G. Libertas
- Full name: Palestra Ginnastica Libertas
- Founded: 1912
- Dissolved: 1926
- Ground: Florence
- Capacity: unknown
Home colours

Palestra Ginnastica Libertas, also known as P.G. Libertas, was an Italian association football club from Florence founded in 1912. The club is short-lived, lasting little more than a decade before merging with fellow Florence club C.S. Firenze in 1926 to form A.C. Fiorentina, which would be one of Serie A's most dominant forces to this day.
