= 1965–66 Coppa Italia =

Tournament details
- Country: Italy
- Dates: 29 Aug 1965 – 19 May 1966
- Teams: 38

Final positions
- Champions: Fiorentina (3rd title)
- Runners-up: Catanzaro

Tournament statistics
- Matches played: 38
- Goals scored: 89 (2.34 per match)
- Top goal scorer: Kurt Hamrin (5 goals)

The 1965–66 Coppa Italia, the 19th Coppa Italia, was an Italian Football Federation domestic cup competition won by Fiorentina.

== First round ==
Home team	Score	Away team
Alessandria	1–3	Lazio
Brescia	2–1	Mantova
Catanzaro	2–0	Messina
Genoa	0–3	Fiorentina
Vicenza	2–0	Padova
Livorno	2–0 (aet)	Roma
Hellas Verona	0–1	Atalanta
Lecco	0–1	Varese
Modena	1–0	Bologna
Monza	1–2 (aet)	Pro Patria
Novara	0–1	Cagliari
Potenza	0–0 (aet) *	Foggia
Pisa	0–1	SPAL
Reggiana	1–1 (aet) *	Palermo
Reggina	0–1	Catania
Vigor Trani	1–2	Napoli
Venezia	1–1 (aet) *	Sampdoria

* Potenza, Palermo and Venezia qualify after drawing of lots.

== Intermediate round ==
Home team	Score	Away team
Potenza	2–2 (aet) *	Pro Patria

* Potenza qualify after drawing of lots.

== Second round ==
Home team	Score	Away team
Livorno	1–2	Varese
Cagliari	0–1	Atalanta
Catania	3–2	Brescia
Fiorentina	4–1	Palermo
Vicenza	2–0	Modena
Lazio	1–0	Venezia
Napoli	0–1	Catanzaro
SPAL	2–0	Potenza

== Third round ==
Home team	Score	Away team
Atalanta	0–2	SPAL
Catanzaro	3–1	Lazio
Fiorentina	1–0	Catania
Varese	2–2 (p: 5–4)	Vicenza

p=after penalty shoot–out

The result of the match Varese–Vicenza was declared void.

Repeat third round match

Home team	Score	Away team
Varese	0–1	Vicenza

== Quarter–finals ==
Milan, Torino, Internazionale and Juventus are added.

Home team	Score	Away team
Milan	1–3	Fiorentina
Catanzaro	0–0 (p: 4–1)	Torino
Vicenza	1–2	Internazionale
SPAL	1–4 (aet)	Juventus

p=after penalty shoot–out

== Semi–finals ==
Home team	Score	Away team
Fiorentina	2–1	Internazionale
Juventus	1–2	Catanzaro

== Final ==
19 May 1966

Fiorentina	2–1 (a.e.t.)	Catanzaro
Hamrin 30'; Bertini 119' (pen.)		Marchioro 47'

Stadio Olimpico, Rome
Referee: Antonio Sbardella

== Top goalscorers ==
Rank	Player	Club	Goals
1	(Sweden) Kurt Hamrin	Fiorentina	5
2	(Italy) Gianni Bui	Catanzaro	4
