= CS Firenze =

Italian football club

Firenze
- Full name: Club Sportivo Firenze
- Founded: 1903
- Dissolved: 1926
- Ground: Florence
- Capacity: unknown
Home colours

Club Sportivo Firenze also known as CS Firenze or simply Firenze, was an Italian football club from Florence, Tuscany, that was founded in 1903. The club is most noted for competing in the early Italian Football Championship competitions (below the very top division), before in 1926 becoming one of two Florence-based clubs that merged to form Fiorentina.
