= 1974–75 Coppa Italia =

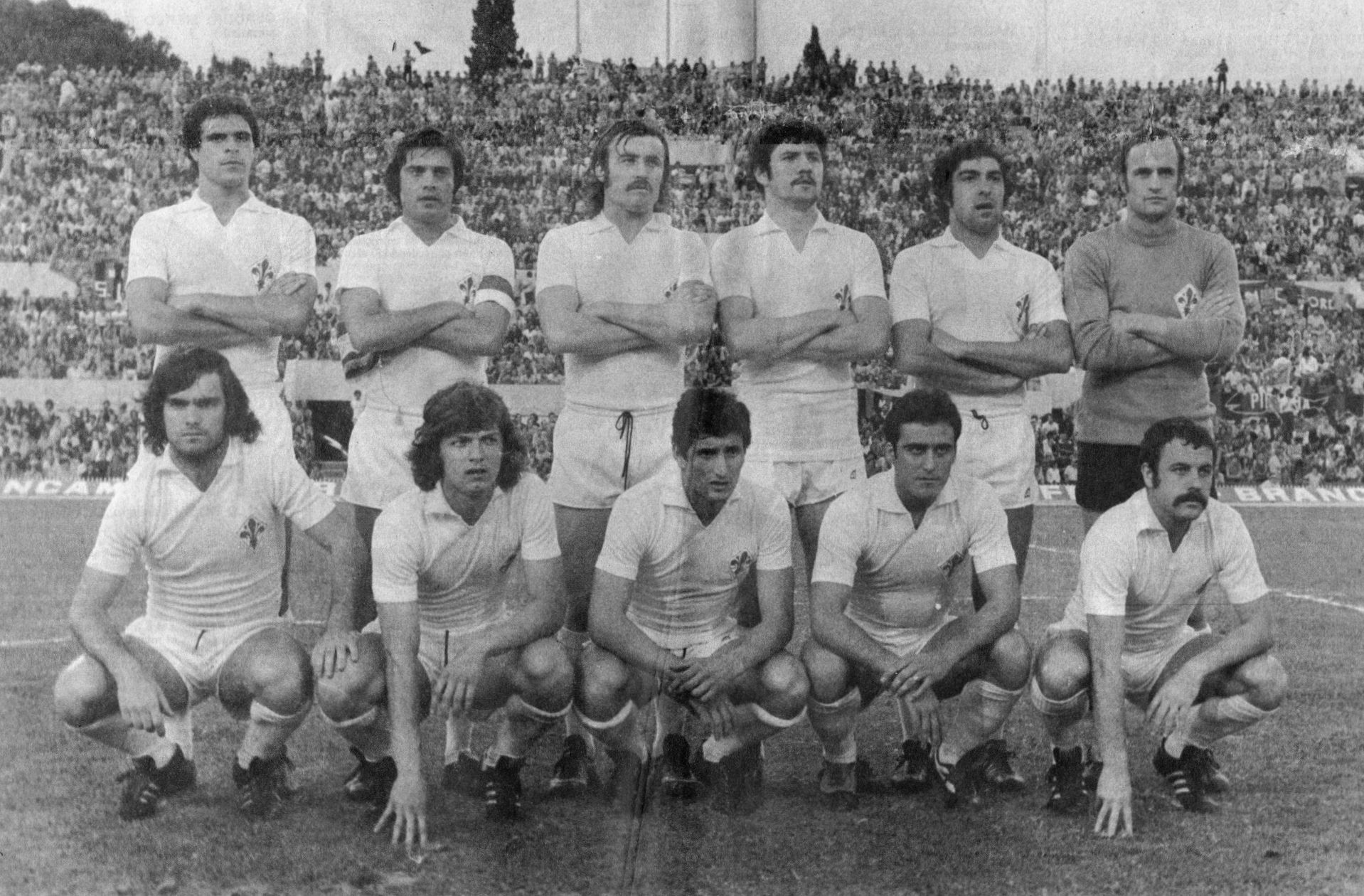
- Fiorentina's winning squad

Tournament details
- Country: Italy
- Dates: 28 Aug 1974 – 28 June 1975
- Teams: 36

Final positions
- Champions: Fiorentina (4th title)
- Runners-up: Milan

Tournament statistics
- Matches played: 95
- Goals scored: 208 (2.19 per match)
- Top goal scorer(s): Pierino Prati; Pietro Anastasi (8 goals)

The 1974–75 Coppa Italia was the 28th Coppa Italia, the major Italian domestic cup. The competition was won by Fiorentina.

== First round ==
=== Group 1 ===
Pos	Team	Pld	W	D	L	GF	GA	GD	Pts
1	Internazionale	4	4	0	0	9	3	+6	8
2	Novara	4	2	1	1	2	2	0	5
3	Brindisi	4	1	1	2	6	6	0	3
4	Vicenza	4	1	1	2	5	6	−1	3
5	Ascoli	4	0	1	3	1	6	−5	1

=== Group 2 ===
Pos	Team	Pld	W	D	L	GF	GA	GD	Pts
1	Napoli	4	4	0	0	8	2	+6	8
2	Hellas Verona	4	2	1	1	6	4	+2	5
3	SPAL	4	1	1	2	4	5	−1	3
4	Catanzaro	4	0	2	2	3	5	−2	2
5	Sampdoria	4	0	2	2	1	6	−5	2

=== Group 3 ===
Pos	Team	Pld	W	D	L	GF	GA	GD	Pts
1	Juventus	4	4	0	0	12	2	+10	8
2	Varese	4	2	1	1	4	5	−1	5
3	Reggiana	4	1	1	2	1	4	−3	3
4	Avellino	4	1	0	3	3	5	−2	2
5	Taranto	4	0	2	2	1	5	−4	2

=== Group 4 ===
Pos	Team	Pld	W	D	L	GF	GA	GD	Pts
1	Torino	4	4	0	0	6	1	+5	8
2	Sambenedettese	4	2	0	2	3	2	+1	4
3	Como	4	1	2	1	5	5	0	4
4	Arezzo	4	0	2	2	4	7	−3	2
5	Cagliari	4	0	2	2	3	6	−3	2

=== Group 5 ===
Pos	Team	Pld	W	D	L	GF	GA	GD	Pts
1	Roma	4	4	0	0	11	3	+8	8
2	Pescara	4	2	1	1	6	5	+1	5
3	Atalanta	4	0	3	1	0	3	−3	3
4	Lazio	4	0	2	2	3	5	−2	2
5	Genoa	4	0	2	2	2	6	−4	2

=== Group 6 ===
Pos	Team	Pld	W	D	L	GF	GA	GD	Pts
1	Milan	4	2	2	0	7	2	+5	6
2	Cesena	4	1	3	0	4	1	+3	5
3	Parma	4	1	2	1	4	5	−1	4
4	Perugia	4	1	1	2	2	5	−3	3
5	Brescia	4	0	2	2	1	5	−4	2

=== Group 7 ===
Pos	Team	Pld	W	D	L	GF	GA	GD	Pts
1	Fiorentina	4	3	1	0	5	2	+3	7
2	Ternana	4	2	2	0	8	2	+6	6
3	Foggia	4	1	1	2	3	5	−2	3
4	Palermo	4	1	0	3	3	3	0	2
5	Alessandria	4	1	0	3	2	9	−7	2

== Second round ==
Join the defending champion: Bologna.

=== Group A ===
Pos	Team	Pld	W	D	L	GF	GA	GD	Pts
1	Fiorentina	6	3	1	2	10	7	+3	7
2	Torino	6	3	1	2	7	5	+2	7
3	Roma	6	1	3	2	5	7	−2	5
4	Napoli	6	2	1	3	4	7	−3	5

=== Group B ===
Pos	Team	Pld	W	D	L	GF	GA	GD	Pts
1	Milan	6	4	1	1	8	3	+5	9
2	Juventus	6	4	0	2	15	6	+9	8
3	Internazionale	6	1	2	3	4	9	−5	4
4	Bologna	6	1	1	4	2	11	−9	3

== Final ==
28 June 1975
20:30

Fiorentina	3–2	Milan
Casarsa 14' (pen.); Guerini 54'; Rosi 67'		Bigon 20'; Chiarugi 65'

Stadio Olimpico, Rome
Attendance: 40,000
Referee: Alberto Michelotti

== Top goalscorers ==
Rank	Player	Club	Goals
1	(Italy) Pierino Prati	Roma	8
1	(Italy) Pietro Anastasi	Juventus	8
3	(Italy) Roberto Boninsegna	Internazionale	6
3	(Italy) Egidio Calloni	Milan	6
5	(Italy) Fernando Viola	Juventus	5
5	(Italy) Oscar Damiani	Juventus	5
5	(Italy) Carlo Petrini	Ternana	5
8	(Italy) Francesco Graziani	Torino	4
8	(Italy) Paolo Pulici	Torino	4
8	(Italy) Vincenzo Marino	Brindisi	4
8	(Italy) Giacomo Libera	Varese	4
8	(Italy) Roberto Bettega	Juventus	4
