= 1961 Coppa Italia final =

13th Coppa Italia final
- Event: 1960–61 Coppa Italia
Fiorentina	Lazio
2	0
- Date: 11 June 1961
- Venue: Stadio Communale, Florence
- Referee: Gino Rigato

The 1961 Coppa Italia final was the final of the 1960–61 Coppa Italia. The match was played on 11 June 1961 between Fiorentina and Lazio. Fiorentina won 2–0.

== Match ==
11 June 1961
17:30

Fiorentina	2–0	Lazio
Petris 4'; Milan 80'

Stadio Communale, Florence
Referee: Gino Rigato

Fiorentina	Lazio

GK	1	(Italy) Enrico Albertosi
DF	2	(Italy) Enzo Robotti
DF	3	(Italy) Sergio Castelletti
DF	4	(Italy) Piero Gonfiantini
DF	5	(Italy) Alberto Orzan
MF	6	(Italy) Rino Marchesi
RW	7	(Sweden) Kurt Hamrin
FW	8	(Italy) Dante Micheli
AM	9	(Brazil) Dino da Costa
FW	10	(Italy) Luigi Milan
LW	11	(Italy) Gianfranco Petris
Managers:
(Hungarian People's Republic) Nándor Hidegkuti and (Italy) Giuseppe Chiappella

GK	1	(Italy) Idilio Cei
DF	2	(Italy) Giovanni Molino
DF	3	(Italy) Eufemi
DF	4	(Italy) Paolo Carosi
DF	5	(Italy) Francesco Janich
MF	6	(Italy) Franco Carradori
MF	7	(Italy) Bruno Franzini
FW	8	(Italy) Amos Mariani
FW	9	(Italy) Orlando Rozzoni
FW	10	(Italy) Maurilio Prini
FW	11	(Italy) Clemente Mattei
Manager:
(Argentina) Enrique Flamini
