= 1961 European Cup Winners' Cup final =

- Event: 1960–61 European Cup Winners' Cup
Rangers	Fiorentina
(Scotland)	(Italy)
1	4
- on aggregate

First leg
Rangers	Fiorentina
0	2
- Date: 17 May 1961
- Venue: Ibrox Park, Glasgow
- Referee: Carl Erich Steiner (Austria)
- Attendance: 80,000

Second leg
Fiorentina	Rangers
2	1
- Date: 27 May 1961
- Venue: Stadio Comunale, Florence
- Referee: Vilmos Hernádi (Hungary)
- Attendance: 50,000

The 1961 European Cup Winners' Cup Final was an association football match contested between Fiorentina of Italy and Rangers of Scotland. It was the final match of the 1960–61 European Cup Winners' Cup and the first European Cup Winners' Cup final. It was the only time that the final was played over two legs. The first leg was played at Ibrox Park, Glasgow and the second leg at the Stadio Comunale in Florence. It was Rangers first European final and in doing so became the first Scottish team to reach the final of a European football competition. It was Fiorentina's second European final having previously reached the 1957 European Cup Final.

Fiorentina won the final 4–1 on aggregate.

== Route to the final ==
=== Rangers ===
Round	Opponents	First leg	Second leg	Aggregate score
Preliminary round	Ferencváros	4–2 (h)	1–2 (a)	5–4
Quarter-finals	Borussia Mönchengladbach	3–0 (a)	8–0 (h)	11–0
Semi-finals	Wolverhampton Wanderers	2–0 (h)	1–1 (a)	3–1

Rangers were required to play a preliminary round in the competition where they beat Ferencváros from Hungary 5-4 on aggregate. They were then drawn against Borussia Mönchengladbach from Germany who they then defeated 11-0 on aggregate. In the semi-final Rangers were then required to play English team Wolverhampton Wanderers. Rangers won the tie 3-1 on aggregate to reach their first ever European final.

=== Fiorentina ===
Round	Opponents	First leg	Second leg	Aggregate score
Quarter-finals	FC Luzern	3–0 (a)	6–2 (h)	9–2
Semi-finals	Dinamo Zagreb	3–0 (h)	1–2 (a) Pens	4–2

Fiorentina went straight into the quarter-finals where they played FC Luzern from Switzerland. They subsequently defeated them and Dinamo Zagreb to reach the final.

== Background ==
The 1961 final was the only time that it had been played over two legs until the competition was merged with the UEFA Cup in 1999.

Fiorentina, who were managed by Hungarian Nándor Hidegkuti, were the recent Coppa Italia winners and had reached the final of the European Cup four years earlier. Their team included many Italian internationals including goalkeeper Enrico Albertosi and Swedish star player Kurt Hamrin.

Rangers were managed by Scot Symon and had reached the semi-final of the European Cup the previous year. Since the start of the 1960-61 season, the all-Scottish Rangers team also included Jim Baxter who would go on to become a legendary figure of the club. Rangers top scorer Jimmy Millar missed the first leg through injury but featured in the return match.

== Match details ==
=== First leg ===
17 May 1961
19:30

Rangers (Scotland)	0–2	(Italy) Fiorentina
	Report	Milan 12', 88'

Ibrox Park, Glasgow
Attendance: 80,000
Referee: Carl Erich Steiner (Austria)

Rangers	Fiorentina

GK	1	(Scotland) Billy Ritchie
DF	2	(Scotland) Bobby Shearer
DF	3	(Scotland) Eric Caldow (c)
DF	4	(Scotland) Harold Davis
DF	5	(Scotland) Bill Paterson
MF	6	(Scotland) Jim Baxter
MF	7	(Scotland) Davie Wilson
MF	8	(Scotland) Ian McMillan
FW	9	(Scotland) Alex Scott
FW	10	(Scotland) Ralph Brand
MF	11	(Scotland) Bobby Hume
Manager:
(Scotland) Scot Symon

GK	1	(Italy) Enrico Albertosi
DF	2	(Italy) Enzo Robotti
DF	3	(Italy) Sergio Castelletti
DF	4	(Italy) Piero Gonfiantini
DF	5	(Italy) Alberto Orzan (c)
MF	6	(Italy) Claudio Rimbaldo
MF	7	(Sweden) Kurt Hamrin
MF	8	(Italy) Dante Micheli
FW	9	(Brazil) Dino da Costa
FW	10	(Italy) Luigi Milan
MF	11	(Italy) Gianfranco Petris
Manager:
(Hungary) Nándor Hidegkuti

=== Second leg ===
27 May 1961
15:30

Fiorentina (Italy)	2–1	(Scotland) Rangers
Milan 13'; Hamrin 86'	Report	Scott 60'

Stadio Comunale, Florence
Attendance: 50,000
Referee: Vilmos Hernádi (Hungary)

Fiorentina	Rangers

GK	1	(Italy) Enrico Albertosi
DF	2	(Italy) Enzo Robotti
DF	3	(Italy) Sergio Castelletti
DF	4	(Italy) Piero Gonfiantini
DF	5	(Italy) Alberto Orzan (c)
MF	6	(Italy) Claudio Rimbaldo
MF	7	(Sweden) Kurt Hamrin
MF	8	(Italy) Dante Micheli
FW	9	(Brazil) Dino da Costa
FW	10	(Italy) Luigi Milan
MF	11	(Italy) Gianfranco Petris
Manager:
(Hungary) Nándor Hidegkuti

RANGERS:
GK	1	(Scotland) Billy Ritchie
DF	2	(Scotland) Bobby Shearer
DF	3	(Scotland) Eric Caldow (c)
DF	4	(Scotland) Harold Davis
DF	5	(Scotland) Bill Paterson
MF	6	(Scotland) Jim Baxter
MF	7	(Scotland) Alex Scott
MF	8	(Scotland) Ian McMillan
FW	9	(Scotland) Jimmy Millar
FW	10	(Scotland) Ralph Brand
MF	11	(Scotland) Davie Wilson
Manager:
(Scotland) Scot Symon

== See also ==
- ACF Fiorentina in European football
- Rangers F.C. in European football
