= 2018 UEFA Europa League final =

- Match programme cover
- Event: 2017–18 UEFA Europa League
Marseille	Atlético Madrid
(France)	(Spain)
0	3
- Date: 16 May 2018
- Venue: Parc Olympique Lyonnais, Décines-Charpieu
- Man of the Match: Antoine Griezmann (Atlético Madrid)
- Referee: Björn Kuipers (Netherlands)
- Attendance: 55,768
- Weather: Cloudy night 18 °C (64 °F); 66% humidity

The 2018 UEFA Europa League final was the final match of the 2017–18 UEFA Europa League, the 47th season of Europe's secondary club football tournament organised by UEFA, and the 9th season since it was renamed from the UEFA Cup to the UEFA Europa League. It was played at the Parc Olympique Lyonnais in Décines-Charpieu, Lyon, France on 16 May 2018, between French side Marseille and Spanish side Atlético Madrid.

Atlético Madrid won the match 3–0 for their third Europa League title. As winners, Atlético Madrid earned the right to play against the winners of the 2017–18 UEFA Champions League, Real Madrid, in the 2018 UEFA Super Cup. They also qualified to enter the group stage of the 2018–19 UEFA Champions League, but since they already qualified through their league performance, the berth reserved was given to the third-placed team of the 2017–18 Ligue 1, Lyon, as Ligue 1 was the 5th-ranked association according to next season's access list.

== Venue ==
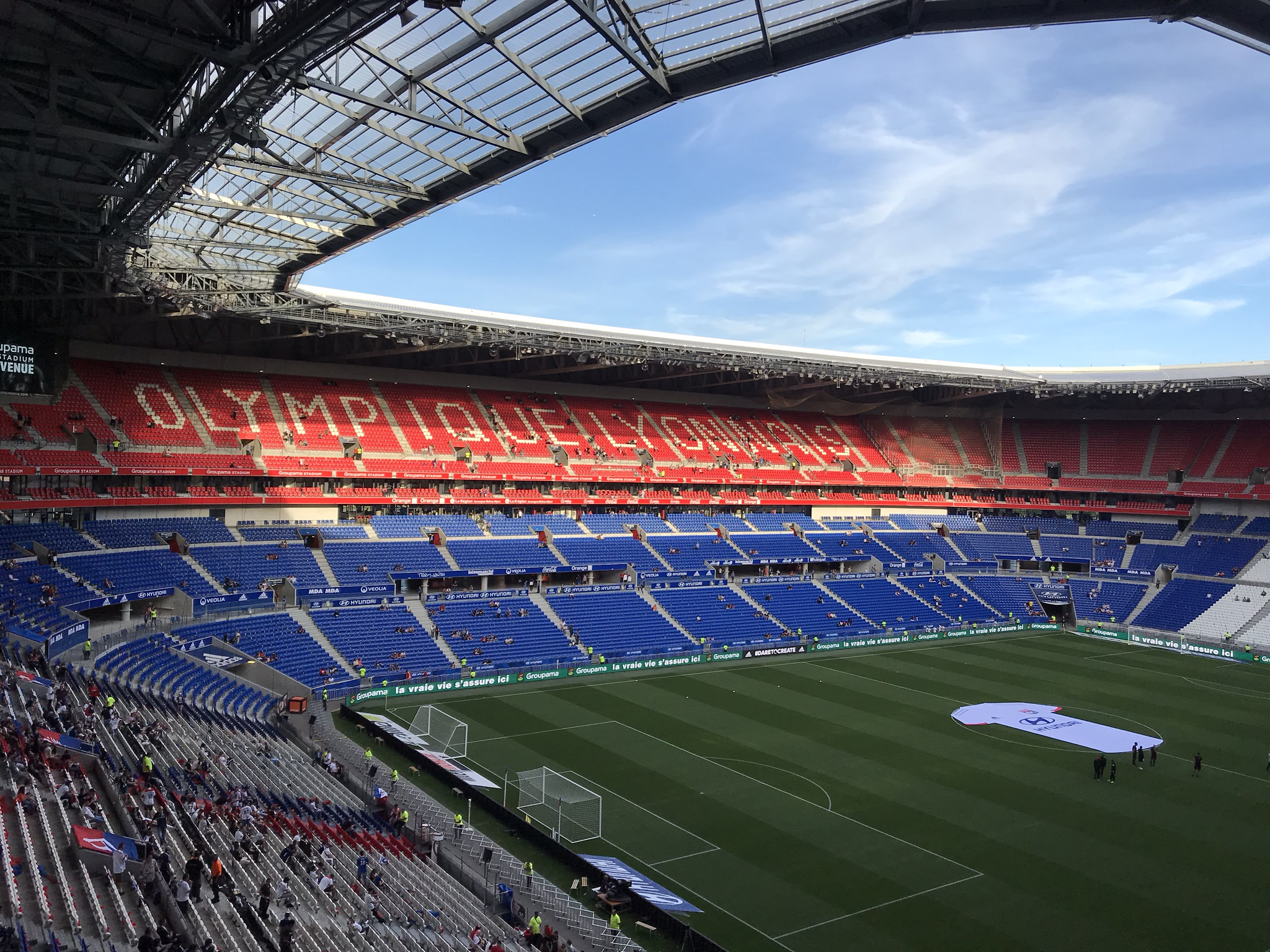
The Parc Olympique Lyonnais was renamed to "Stade de Lyon" for the match

The Parc Olympique Lyonnais was announced as the final venue on 9 December 2016, following the decision of the UEFA Executive Committee meeting in Nyon, Switzerland.

== Background ==
Marseille reached their third final after a 3–2 aggregate win against Austrian side Red Bull Salzburg, clinched after extra time. They lost the final in both previous occasions (1999 and 2004). This was also their fifth final in all seasonal UEFA competitions, having also played in two European Cup/Champions League finals (winning in 1993; and losing in 1991).

Atlético Madrid also reached their third final after a 2–1 aggregate win against English side Arsenal. They won the final in both previous occasions (2010 and 2012). This was also their ninth final in UEFA seasonal competitions, having played in three European Cup/Champions League finals (losing in 1974, 2014 and 2016) and three Cup Winners' Cup final (winning in 1962; and losing in 1963 and 1986).

The two teams had played each other twice in the Champions League. Atlético Madrid won the first match, while the second was drawn in the 2008–09 UEFA Champions League group stage.

=== Previous finals ===
In the following table, finals until 2009 were in the UEFA Cup era, since 2010 were in the UEFA Europa League era.

Team	Previous finals appearances (bold indicates winners)
(France) Marseille	2 (1999, 2004)
(Spain) Atlético Madrid	2 (**2010**, **2012**)

== Route to the final ==
Note: In all results below, the score of the finalist is given first (H: home; A: away).

(France) Marseille				Round	(Spain) Atlético Madrid			
Europa League					Champions League			
Opponent	Agg.	1st leg	2nd leg	Qualifying phase (EL, CL)	Bye			
(Belgium) Oostende	4–2	4–2 (H)	0–0 (A)	Third qualifying round	Bye			
(Slovenia) Domžale	4–1	1–1 (A)	3–0 (H)	Play-off round	Bye			
Opponent	Result			Group stage (EL, CL)	Opponent	Result		
(Turkey) Konyaspor	1–0 (H)			Matchday 1	(Italy) Roma	0–0 (A)		
(Austria) Red Bull Salzburg	0–1 (A)			Matchday 2	(England) Chelsea	1–2 (H)		
(Portugal) Vitória de Guimarães	2–1 (H)			Matchday 3	(Azerbaijan) Qarabağ	0–0 (A)		
(Portugal) Vitória de Guimarães	0–1 (A)			Matchday 4	(Azerbaijan) Qarabağ	1–1 (H)		
(Turkey) Konyaspor	1–1 (A)			Matchday 5	(Italy) Roma	2–0 (H)		
(Austria) Red Bull Salzburg	0–0 (H)			Matchday 6	(England) Chelsea	1–1 (A)		
Group I runners-up: Pos / Team / Pld / Pts; 1 / (Austria) Red Bull Salzburg / 6 / 12; 2 / (France) Marseille / 6 / 8; 3 / (Turkey) Konyaspor / 6 / 6; 4 / (Portugal) Vitória de Guimarães / 6 / 5; Source: UEFA				Final standings	Group C third place: Pos / Team / Pld / Pts; 1 / (Italy) Roma / 6 / 11; 2 / (England) Chelsea / 6 / 11; 3 / (Spain) Atlético Madrid / 6 / 7; 4 / (Azerbaijan) Qarabağ / 6 / 2; Source: UEFA			
Group I runners-up: Pos / Team / Pld / Pts; 1 / (Austria) Red Bull Salzburg / 6 / 12; 2 / (France) Marseille / 6 / 8; 3 / (Turkey) Konyaspor / 6 / 6; 4 / (Portugal) Vitória de Guimarães / 6 / 5; Source: UEFA					Europa League			
Opponent	Agg.	1st leg	2nd leg	Knockout phase	Opponent	Agg.	1st leg	2nd leg
(Portugal) Braga	3–1	3–0 (H)	0–1 (A)	Round of 32	(Denmark) Copenhagen	5–1	4–1 (A)	1–0 (H)
(Spain) Athletic Bilbao	5–2	3–1 (H)	2–1 (A)	Round of 16	(Russia) Lokomotiv Moscow	8–1	3–0 (H)	5–1 (A)
(Germany) RB Leipzig	5–3	0–1 (A)	5–2 (H)	Quarter-finals	(Portugal) Sporting CP	2–1	2–0 (H)	0–1 (A)
(Austria) Red Bull Salzburg	3–2	2–0 (H)	1–2 (a.e.t.) (A)	Semi-finals	(England) Arsenal	2–1	1–1 (A)	1–0 (H)

== Pre-match ==
=== Ambassador ===
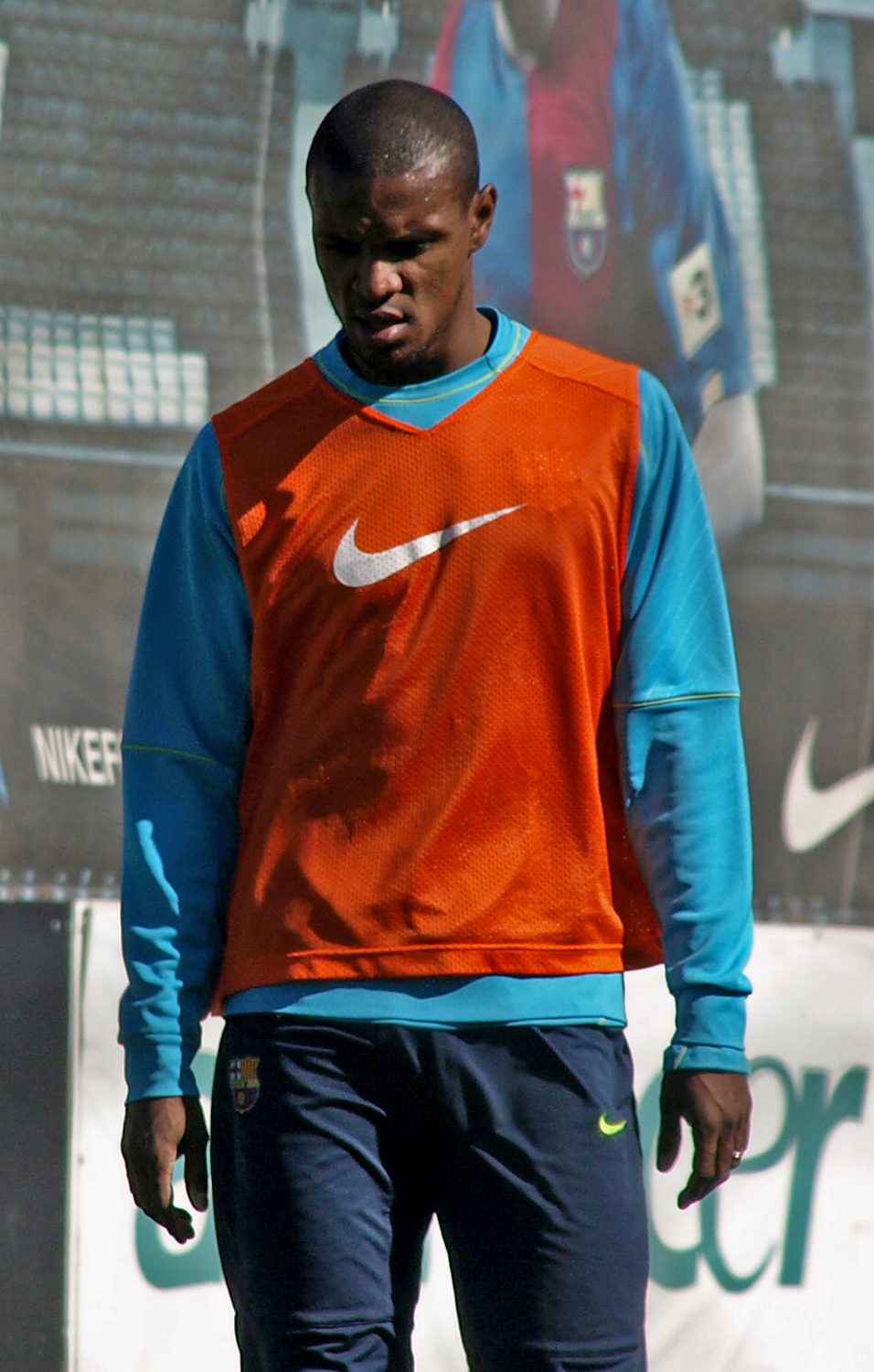
Eric Abidal was named as the ambassador for the final.

The ambassador for the final was former French international Eric Abidal, who played three seasons at Lyon and later won two UEFA Champions League titles with Barcelona.

=== Ticketing ===
With a stadium capacity of 57,000 for the final, a total amount of 23,000 tickets were available to fans and the general public, with the two finalist teams receiving tickets (number to be confirmed) each and with the other tickets being available for sale to fans worldwide via UEFA.com from 15 to 22 March 2018 in four price categories: €150, €100, €70, and €45. The remaining tickets were allocated to the local organising committee, UEFA and national associations, commercial partners and broadcasters, and to serve the corporate hospitality programme.

=== Officials ===
On 7 May 2018, UEFA announced that Dutchman Björn Kuipers would officiate the final. It was the second time he was appointed for a UEFA Europa League final, as he had already been the referee in the 2013 final. He was also the referee for the 2014 UEFA Champions League Final, which Atlético lost to Real Madrid in extra time. He was joined by his fellow countrymen, with Sander van Roekel and Erwin Zeinstra as assistant referees, Danny Makkelie and Pol van Boekel as additional assistant referees, and Mario Diks as reserve assistant referee. The fourth official for the final was Szymon Marciniak from Poland.

=== Opening ceremony ===
French DJ duo Ofenbach performed at the opening ceremony preceding the final.

== Match ==
=== Summary ===
In the 21st minute, André-Frank Zambo Anguissa miss-controlled a pass out from goalkeeper Steve Mandanda, the ball came to Gabi who passed into Antoine Griezmann who scored with a low shot into the bottom left corner. Marseille captain Dimitri Payet left the match due to injury in the 32nd minute. It was 2–0 in the 49th minute when Antoine Griezmann dinked the ball past the advancing Steve Mandanda and into the bottom left from inside the penalty area after a pass from Koke. Gabi got the third goal in the 89th minute with a low right foot finish from the right after another pass from Koke.

=== Details ===
The "home" team (for administrative purposes) was determined by an additional draw held after the semi-final draw, which was held on 13 April 2018, 12:00 CEST, at the UEFA headquarters in Nyon, Switzerland.

16 May 2018
20:45 UTC+2

Marseille (France)	0–3	(Spain) Atlético Madrid
	Report	Griezmann 21', 49'; Gabi 89'

Parc Olympique Lyonnais, Décines-Charpieu
Attendance: 55,768
Referee: Björn Kuipers (Netherlands)

Marseille	Atlético Madrid

GK	30	(France) Steve Mandanda
RB	17	(France) Bouna Sarr
CB	23	(France) Adil Rami
CB	19	(Brazil) Luiz Gustavo	(yellow card) 75'
LB	18	(France) Jordan Amavi	(yellow card) 38'
CM	29	(Cameroon) André-Frank Zambo Anguissa
CM	8	(France) Morgan Sanson
RW	26	(France) Florian Thauvin
AM	10	(France) Dimitri Payet (c)		(substituted off) 32'
LW	5	(Argentina) Lucas Ocampos		(substituted off) 55'
CF	28	(France) Valère Germain		(substituted off) 74'
Substitutes:
GK	16	(France) Yohann Pelé
DF	2	(Japan) Hiroki Sakai
DF	6	(Portugal) Rolando
MF	4	(France) Boubacar Kamara
MF	27	(France) Maxime Lopez		(substituted on) 32'
FW	11	(Greece) Kostas Mitroglou		(substituted on) 74'
FW	14	(Cameroon) Clinton N'Jie	(yellow card) 78'	(substituted on) 55'
Manager:
(France) Rudi Garcia

GK	13	(Slovenia) Jan Oblak
RB	16	(Croatia) Šime Vrsaljko	(yellow card) 23'	(substituted off) 46'
CB	24	(Uruguay) José Giménez
CB	2	(Uruguay) Diego Godín
LB	19	(France) Lucas Hernandez	(yellow card) 78'
RM	11	(Argentina) Ángel Correa		(substituted off) 88'
CM	14	(Spain) Gabi (c)
CM	8	(Spain) Saúl Ñíguez
LM	6	(Spain) Koke
CF	7	(France) Antoine Griezmann		(substituted off) 90'
CF	18	(Spain) Diego Costa
Substitutes:
GK	25	(Argentina) Axel Werner
DF	3	(Brazil) Filipe Luís
DF	15	(Montenegro) Stefan Savić
DF	20	(Spain) Juanfran		(substituted on) 46'
MF	5	(Ghana) Thomas Partey		(substituted on) 88'
FW	9	(Spain) Fernando Torres		(substituted on) 90'
FW	21	(France) Kevin Gameiro
Manager:
(Argentina) Germán Burgos (Note: Atlético Madrid manager Diego Simeone was given a four-match touchline ban in UEFA competitions following the semi-final first leg. Assistant manager Germán Burgos filled in as manager.)

Man of the Match:
Antoine Griezmann (Atlético Madrid)

Assistant referees:
Sander van Roekel (Netherlands)
Erwin Zeinstra (Netherlands)
Fourth official:
Szymon Marciniak (Poland)
Additional assistant referees:
Danny Makkelie (Netherlands)
Pol van Boekel (Netherlands)
Reserve assistant referee:
Mario Diks (Netherlands)

Match rules

- 90 minutes.
- 30 minutes of extra time if necessary.
- Penalty shoot-out if scores still level.
- Seven named substitutes, of which up to three may be used.

=== Statistics ===
First half
Statistic	Marseille	Atlético Madrid
Goals scored	0	1
Total shots	6	4
Shots on target	1	1
Saves	0	1
Ball possession	61%	39%
Corner kicks	0	0
Fouls committed	8	7
Offsides	0	1
Yellow cards	1	1
Red cards	0	0

Second half
Statistic	Marseille	Atlético Madrid
Goals scored	0	2
Total shots	6	8
Shots on target	1	3
Saves	1	1
Ball possession	50%	50%
Corner kicks	1	6
Fouls committed	10	2
Offsides	0	2
Yellow cards	2	1
Red cards	0	0

Overall
Statistic	Marseille	Atlético Madrid
Goals scored	0	3
Total shots	12	12
Shots on target	2	4
Saves	1	2
Ball possession	56%	44%
Corner kicks	1	6
Fouls committed	18	9
Offsides	0	3
Yellow cards	3	2
Red cards	0	0

== See also ==
- 2018 UEFA Champions League final
- 2018 UEFA Super Cup
- Atlético Madrid in European football
- Olympique de Marseille in European football
- 2017–18 Atlético Madrid season
- 2017–18 Olympique de Marseille season
