= 1962 European Cup Winners' Cup final =

- Event: 1961–62 European Cup Winners' Cup
Atlético Madrid	Fiorentina
(Spain)	(Italy)
- Atlético Madrid won after a replay

Final
Atlético Madrid	Fiorentina
1	1
- After extra time
- Date: 10 May 1962
- Venue: Hampden Park, Glasgow
- Referee: Tiny Wharton (Scotland)
- Attendance: 29,066

Replay
Atlético Madrid	Fiorentina
3	0
- Date: 5 September 1962
- Venue: Neckarstadion, Stuttgart
- Referee: Kurt Tschenscher (West Germany)
- Attendance: 38,120

The 1962 European Cup Winners' Cup Final was a football match contested between Atlético Madrid of Spain and the defending champions ACF Fiorentina of Italy. The final at Hampden Park, Glasgow finished 1–1 after extra time. Madrid won 3–0 in the replay at Neckarstadion in Stuttgart. The replay was staged almost four months after the playing of the original game at Hampden Park on the same day as the first leg of the preliminary-round games for the 1962–63 European Cup Winners' Cup campaign. This was the second European Cup Winners' Cup final and the first to be played as a one-off match following the two-legged tie held the previous year.

== Route to the final ==
(Spain) Atlético Madrid					(Italy) Fiorentina			
Opponent	Agg.	1st leg	2nd leg		Opponent	Agg.	1st leg	2nd leg
(France) Sedan	7–3	3–2 (A)	4–1 (H)	Prel. round	Bye			
(England) Leicester City	3–1	1–1 (A)	2–0 (H)	First round	(Austria) Rapid Wien	9–3	3–1 (H)	6–2 (A)
(West Germany) Werder Bremen	4–2	1–1 (A)	3–1 (H)	Quarter-finals	(Czechoslovakia) Dynamo Žilina	4–3	2–3 (A)	2–0 (H)
(East Germany) Motor Jena	5–0	1–0 (A)	4–0 (H)	Semi-finals	(Hungary) Újpesti Dózsa	3–0	2–0 (H)	1–0 (A)

== Match ==
=== Details ===
10 May 1962
19:00

Atlético Madrid (Spain)	1–1 (a.e.t.)	(Italy) Fiorentina
Peiró 11'	Report	Hamrin 27'

Hampden Park, Glasgow
Attendance: 29,066
Referee: Tiny Wharton (Scotland)

Atlético Madrid	Fiorentina

GK	1	(Argentina) Edgardo Madinabeytia
DF		(Spain) Feliciano Rivilla
DF		(Spain) Isacio Calleja
DF		(Brazil) Ramiro
DF		(Spain) Chuzo
MF		(Spain) Jesús Glaría
MF		(Spain) Miguel Jones
FW		(Spain) Adelardo Rodríguez
FW		(Portugal) Mendonça
MF		(Spain) Joaquín Peiró
FW		(Spain) Enrique Collar (c)
Manager:
(Spain) José Villalonga

GK	1	(Italy) Giuliano Sarti
DF	2	(Italy) Amilcare Ferretti
DF	3	(Italy) Sergio Castelletti
DF	4	(Italy) Piero Gonfiantini
DF	5	(Italy) Alberto Orzan (c)
MF	6	(Italy) Claudio Rimbaldo
MF	7	(Sweden) Kurt Hamrin
MF	8	(Turkey) Can Bartu
FW	9	(Italy) Lucio Dell'Angelo
FW	10	(Italy) Aurelio Milani
FW	11	(Italy) Gianfranco Petris
Manager:
(Italy) Ferruccio Valcareggi

=== Replay ===
5 September 1962
16:30

Atlético Madrid (Spain)	3–0	(Italy) Fiorentina
Jones 8'; Mendonça 27'; Peiró 59'	Report

Neckarstadion, Stuttgart
Attendance: 38,120
Referee: Kurt Tschenscher (West Germany)

Atlético Madrid	Fiorentina

GK	1	(Argentina) Edgardo Madinabeytia
DF		(Spain) Feliciano Rivilla
DF		(Spain) Isacio Calleja
DF		(Brazil) Ramiro
DF		(Argentina) Jorge Griffa
MF		(Spain) Jesús Glaría
MF		(Spain) Miguel Jones
FW		(Spain) Adelardo Rodríguez
FW		(Portugal) Mendonça
MF		(Spain) Joaquín Peiró
FW		(Spain) Enrique Collar (c)
Manager:
(Spain) José Villalonga

GK	1	(Italy) Enrico Albertosi
DF	2	(Italy) Enzo Robotti
DF	3	(Italy) Sergio Castelletti
DF	4	(Italy) Saul Malatrasi
DF	5	(Italy) Alberto Orzan (c)
MF	6	(Italy) Rino Marchesi
MF	7	(Sweden) Kurt Hamrin
MF	8	(Italy) Amilcare Ferretti
FW	9	(Italy) Lucio Dell'Angelo
FW	10	(Italy) Gianfranco Petris
MF	11	(Italy) Aurelio Milani
Manager:
(Italy) Ferruccio Valcareggi

== See also ==
- ACF Fiorentina in European football
- Atlético Madrid in European football
