= 2010 UEFA Super Cup =

- Official match programme
Inter Milan	Atlético Madrid
(Italy)	(Spain)
0	2
- Date: 27 August 2010
- Venue: Stade Louis II, Monaco
- Man of the Match: José Antonio Reyes (Atlético Madrid)
- Referee: Massimo Busacca (Switzerland)
- Attendance: 17,265
- Weather: Cloudy night 26 °C (79 °F); 83% humidity

The 2010 UEFA Super Cup was the 35th UEFA Super Cup, between the reigning champions of the two club competitions organised by the European football governing body UEFA: the UEFA Champions League and the UEFA Europa League. It took place at the Stade Louis II in Monaco on 27 August 2010. It was contested by Inter Milan, who won the 2009–10 UEFA Champions League, and Atlético Madrid, who won the 2009–10 UEFA Europa League. Neither side had previously competed in the UEFA Super Cup. As part of a trial that started in the 2009–10 UEFA Europa League, two extra officials – one on each goal line – were used in this match.

== Background ==
For the first time since Chelsea played Real Madrid in 1998, both teams were playing in their first UEFA Super Cup. Inter Milan reached the Super Cup as winners of the 2009–10 UEFA Champions League, having beaten Bayern Munich 2–0 in the final at the Santiago Bernabéu Stadium in Madrid, while Atlético Madrid beat Fulham 2–1 in the 2010 UEFA Europa League Final at the HSH Nordbank Arena in Hamburg to claim their first major European honour since the 1962 Cup Winners' Cup and their place in the Super Cup. Although the 2009–10 Champions League was not Inter's first European title, the Super Cup was not established until eight years after their last European Cup win in 1965 and the UEFA Cup winners did not qualify for the Super Cup until after the UEFA Cup Winners' Cup was disestablished in 1999 (Inter last won the UEFA Cup in 1998); they have never won the Cup Winners' Cup. Atlético's 1962 Cup Winners' Cup win also came before the establishment of the Super Cup.

Inter and Atlético Madrid had never played against each other in European competition, and both teams had exact 50% records against teams from the other's country: in 37 matches against Spanish opposition, Inter had both won and lost 13 matches, with the remaining 11 ending as draws, while Atlético had won six, lost six and drawn two matches against Italian opposition.

== Venue and ticketing ==
The Stade Louis II in Monaco has been the venue for the UEFA Super Cup every year since 1998. Built in 1985, the stadium is also the home of AS Monaco, who play in the French league system.

Approximately 30% of the 18,500 seats in the stadium were reserved for fans of each of the two teams involved; these tickets were available from the two clubs. Approximately 1,500 of the remaining tickets went on sale to the general public via the UEFA website on 5 July 2010; applications closed on 16 July. If the number of applications exceeds the number of tickets available, a random ballot will occur to determine ticket allocation.

== Match ==
=== Details ===
27 August 2010
20:45 CEST

Inter Milan (Italy)	0–2	(Spain) Atlético Madrid
	Report	Reyes 62'; Agüero 83'

Stade Louis II, Monaco
Attendance: 17,265
Referee: Massimo Busacca (Switzerland)

Inter Milan	Atlético Madrid

GK	1	(Brazil) Júlio César
RB	13	(Brazil) Maicon
CB	25	(Argentina) Walter Samuel	(yellow card) 90+2'
CB	6	(Brazil) Lúcio
LB	26	(Romania) Cristian Chivu
CM	5	(Serbia) Dejan Stanković		(substituted off) 68'
CM	4	(Argentina) Javier Zanetti (c)
CM	19	(Argentina) Esteban Cambiasso
AM	10	(Netherlands) Wesley Sneijder		(substituted off) 79'
AM	9	(Cameroon) Samuel Eto'o
CF	22	(Argentina) Diego Milito
Substitutes:
GK	12	(Italy) Luca Castellazzi
DF	2	(Colombia) Iván Córdoba
DF	23	(Italy) Marco Materazzi
MF	17	(Kenya) McDonald Mariga
MF	29	(Brazil) Philippe Coutinho		(substituted on) 79'
FW	27	(North Macedonia) Goran Pandev		(substituted on) 68'
FW	88	(France) Jonathan Biabiany
Manager:
(Spain) Rafael Benítez

GK	13	(Spain) David de Gea
RB	17	(Czech Republic) Tomáš Ujfaluši
CB	21	(Colombia) Luis Perea
CB	15	(Uruguay) Diego Godín
LB	18	(Spain) Álvaro Domínguez
DM	12	(Brazil) Paulo Assunção
RW	19	(Spain) José Antonio Reyes		(substituted off) 69'
AM	8	(Spain) Raúl García	(yellow card) 89'
LW	20	(Portugal) Simão (c)	(yellow card) 85'	(substituted off) 90+1'
CF	10	(Argentina) Sergio Agüero
CF	7	(Uruguay) Diego Forlán		(substituted off) 82'
Substitutes:
GK	27	(Spain) Joel Robles
DF	3	(Spain) Antonio López
MF	4	(Spain) Mario Suárez
MF	6	(Spain) Ignacio Camacho		(substituted on) 90+1'
MF	9	(Spain) José Manuel Jurado		(substituted on) 82'
MF	11	(Spain) Fran Mérida		(substituted on) 69'
FW	22	(Brazil) Diego Costa
Manager:
(Spain) Quique Sánchez Flores

Man of the Match:
José Antonio Reyes (Atlético Madrid)

Assistant referees:
Matthias Arnet (Switzerland)
Manuel Navarro (Switzerland)
Fourth official:
Sascha Kever (Switzerland)
Additional assistant referees:
Stéphan Studer (Switzerland)
Cyril Zimmermann (Switzerland)

Match rules

- 90 minutes.
- 30 minutes of extra time if necessary.
- Penalty shoot-out if scores still level.
- Seven named substitutes.
- Maximum of three substitutions.

=== Statistics ===
First half
Statistic	Inter Milan	Atlético Madrid
Goals scored	0	0
Total shots	5	5
Shots on target	0	0
Saves	0	0
Ball possession	46%	54%
Corner kicks	4	3
Fouls committed	6	8
Offsides	3	1
Yellow cards	0	0
Red cards	0	0

Second half
Statistic	Inter Milan	Atlético Madrid
Goals scored	0	2
Total shots	6	7
Shots on target	2	7
Saves	5	1
Ball possession	59%	41%
Corner kicks	5	1
Fouls committed	6	13
Offsides	2	1
Yellow cards	1	2
Red cards	0	0

Overall
Statistic	Inter Milan	Atlético Madrid
Goals scored	0	2
Total shots	11	12
Shots on target	2	7
Saves	5	1
Ball possession	52%	48%
Corner kicks	9	4
Fouls committed	12	21
Offsides	5	1
Yellow cards	1	2
Red cards	0	0

== See also ==
- 2010–11 UEFA Champions League
- 2010–11 UEFA Europa League
- 2010–11 Atlético Madrid season
- 2010–11 Inter Milan season
- Atlético Madrid in European football
- Inter Milan in international football
