= Bill Paterson (footballer, born 1930) =

Scottish footballer

Personal information
- Full name: William Alexander Kennedy Paterson
- Date of birth: 25 February 1930
- Place of birth: Kinlochleven, Scotland
- Date of death: 9 November 2002 (aged 72)
- Place of death: Inverness, Scotland
- Position: Centre back

Youth career
- Caledonian
- Ransome & Marles

Senior career*
Years	Team	Apps	(Gls)
1950−1955	Doncaster Rovers	113	(0)
1955−1958	Newcastle United	22	(1)
1958−1962	Rangers	67	(0)
1962−1963	Morton	0	(0)
- Cheltenham Town
1964−1965	Caledonian		
1965−1966	Hamilton Primos		

International career
1954	Scotland B	1	(0)

Managerial career
- 1964−1965: Caledonian
- 1965−1967: Hamilton Primos
- * Club domestic league appearances and goals

William Alexander Kennedy Paterson (25 February 1930 – 9 November 2002) was a Scottish footballer, who played as a defender.

== Career ==
Paterson had originally started his football career in the Highland League with Inverness club Caledonian, prior to being called up for National Service in England. He was playing for Midland League club Ransome and Marles based in Newark where he was picked up by Doncaster Rovers in 1950. After five successful seasons with the club, he left to sign for Newcastle United for £22,250 plus that Newcastle would play Rovers with the proceeds adding to the transfer deal.

He had a relatively unsuccessful three years on Tyneside and so returned to Scotland to join Rangers for £3,500. His debut came on 13 August 1958 in a 2-1 home league win against Partick Thistle. That was the first of three appearances that he would make that entire season.

Overall Paterson did go on to make 116 top team appearances for the club and won two Scottish league championships. He also claimed a Scottish Cup, a Scottish League Cup, a Charity Cup winners medal and was a part of the Rangers side that lost to Fiorentina in the 1961 UEFA Cup Winners' Cup Final.

He left Ibrox in 1962 and joined Greenock Morton but never made a single league appearance for the club. He later joined Cheltenham Town of the Southern League. This was followed by a spell in the 1964/65 season as player/manager with Caledonian. In the summer of 1965 he played in the Eastern Canada Professional Soccer League with Hamilton Primos. The following season he served as the player-coach for Hamilton. He continued managing Hamilton when the club joined the National Soccer League in 1967.
