= Juanfran (footballer, born 1985) =

Spanish footballer

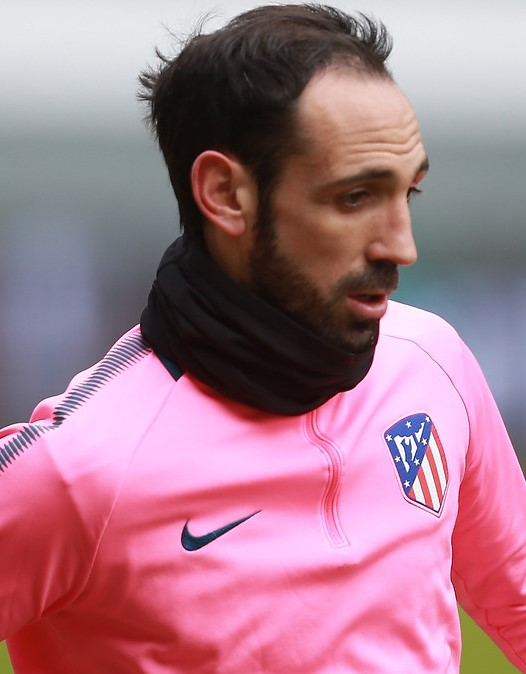
- Juanfran with Atlético Madrid in 2018

Personal information
- Full name: Juan Francisco Torres Belén
- Date of birth: 9 January 1985 (age 41)
- Place of birth: Crevillent, Spain
- Height: 1.81 m (5 ft 11 in)
- Position: Right-back

Youth career
- Kelme
- Real Madrid

Senior career*
Years	Team	Apps	(Gls)
2003–2005	Real Madrid B	56	(7)
2004–2006	Real Madrid	6	(0)
2005–2006	→ Espanyol (loan)	30	(1)
2006–2011	Osasuna	148	(12)
2011–2019	Atlético Madrid	243	(3)
2019–2021	São Paulo	50	(0)
Total		533	(23)

International career
2003	Spain U17	4	(1)
2003	Spain U18	3	(0)
2004	Spain U19	4	(1)
2003–2005	Spain U20	11	(3)
2004–2006	Spain U21	9	(0)
2012–2016	Spain	22	(1)
Medal record
Representing Spain
UEFA European Championship
Winner	2012 Poland-Ukraine
- * Club domestic league appearances and goals

Juan Francisco Torres Belén (Spanish pronunciation: [ˈxwaɱ fɾanˈθisko ˈtores βeˈlen]; (Note: In isolation, Belén is pronounced [beˈlen].) born 9 January 1985), known as Juanfran (pronounced [ˈxwaɱfɾan]), is a Spanish former professional footballer who played as a right-back.

After starting out at Real Madrid, he went on to make a name for himself in La Liga with Osasuna and Atlético Madrid, signing for the latter club in 2011 and going on to win seven major titles, including the 2014 national championship and the 2012 and 2018 Europa League tournaments. He totalled 427 appearances in Spain's top flight.

A Spanish international since 2012, Juanfran was part of the squad that won that year's European Championship, and also represented the nation at the 2014 World Cup and Euro 2016.

== Club career ==
=== Real Madrid ===
Born in Crevillent, Alicante, Valencian Community, Juanfran was a product of Real Madrid's youth academy. He had his first main squad opportunity on 24 January 2004, playing 15 minutes in a 2–1 home win against Villarreal CF after solid performances with the B team. He would appear in a further five La Liga matches over that and the following seasons, totalling 11 appearances.

Juanfran was loaned out to RCD Espanyol for 2005–06 and, although the Catalan side barely avoided relegation, he featured heavily throughout the campaign, scoring on 22 March 2006 in a 1–1 draw at Athletic Bilbao. He started his career as a winger.

=== Osasuna ===
Juanfran signed with CA Osasuna after a deal that allowed Osasuna to get the player without having to pay a transfer fee and with per-set price of €10 million, adding several specifics, which included a possibility of a January 2007 recall by Madrid who also retained a buying option at the end of the season. He played his first game for the Navarrese on 24 September 2006 in a 2–0 away victory over RC Celta de Vigo, and scored the second goal of the match. Additionally, he appeared in nine games and netted once in their semi-final run in the UEFA Cup.

In 2008–09, Juanfran was again ever-present in Osasuna's lineups. On 31 May 2009, in the last matchday, he scored from 30 yards in a 2–1 home defeat of former side Real Madrid, which kept the club in the top flight for another year. In the following campaign, as the former fared better in the league by finishing 12th, he scored a career-best four goals.

=== Atlético Madrid ===
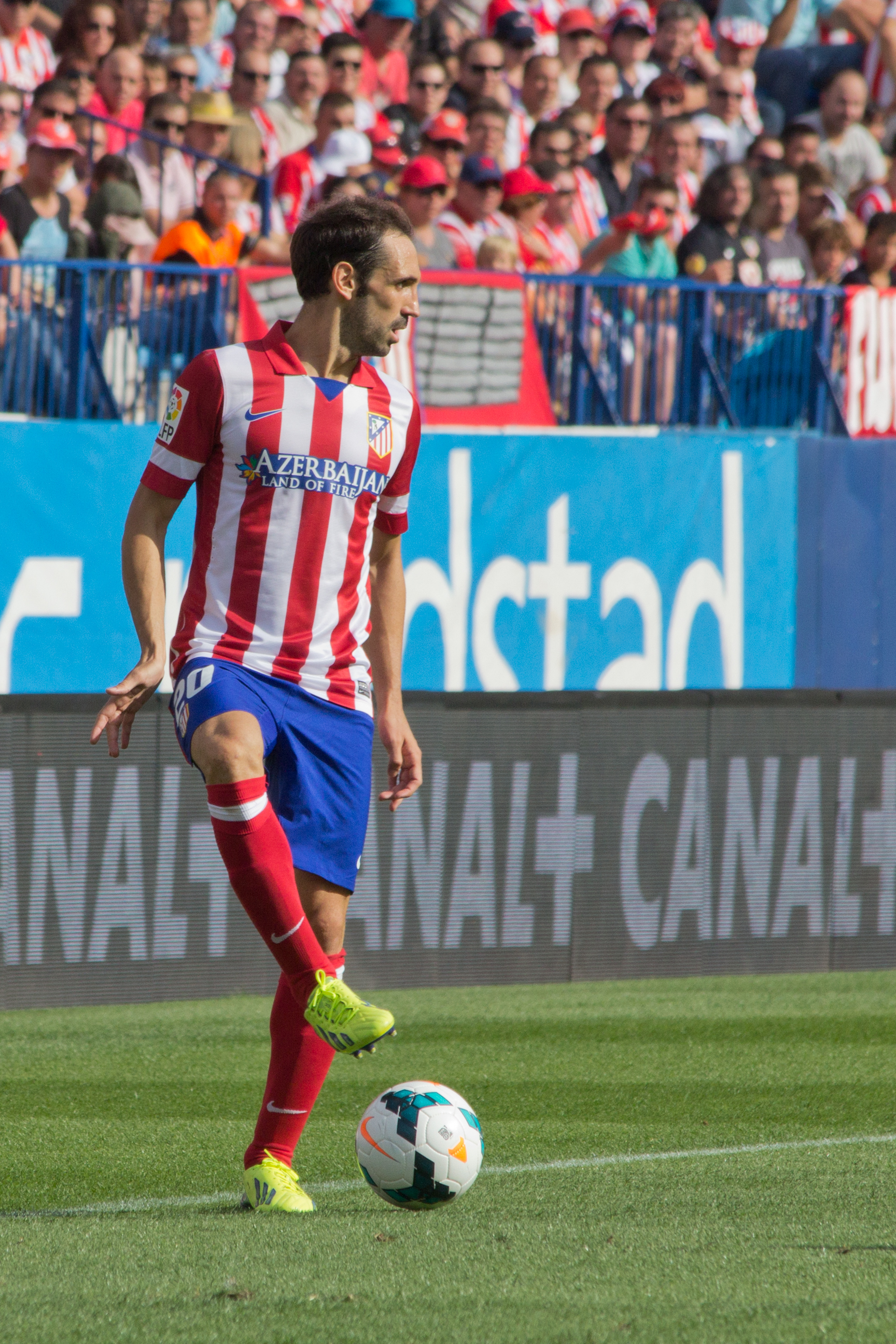
Juanfran (right) playing against Almería in 2013

On 11 January 2011, Juanfran signed for Atlético Madrid until June 2015 for a fee of just over €4 million. He made his official debut two days later, starting in a 3–1 away loss against his first professional club Real Madrid in the quarter-finals of the Copa del Rey.

Juanfran scored his first goal for Atlético on 21 May 2011, in a 4–3 win at RCD Mallorca – the last game of the season – dedicating it to his father who had died two weeks beforehand. In 2011–12 he began being regularly played as a right-back, by both Gregorio Manzano and his successor, Diego Simeone. In the Europa League final, which his team won 3–0 against Athletic, he played in that position; after the match, he dedicated the triumph to his late father, saying "My baby son Oliver is here with me; the only words he knows are 'mama' and 'Atleti', I dedicate this win to my family and to my dad, who passed away last year. I know he's up there looking down on us celebrating now."

On 24 May 2014, Juanfran played all 120 minutes of the Champions League final, lost 4–1 to Real Madrid at the Estádio da Luz. He signed a contract extension one month later, running until 2018.

Juanfran started both legs of the round-of-16 Champions League tie against PSV Eindhoven; on 15 March 2016, in the second match, he took the decisive penalty in the 8–7 shootout win (0–0 on aggregate). In the final of the competition, also decided on penalties after a 1–1 draw in Milan, he was the only player to fail to convert in an eventual defeat to his former club Real Madrid.

Juanfran left Atlético upon the expiration of his contract on 30 June 2019, having made 355 appearances and won seven trophies for the club.

=== São Paulo ===
On 3 August 2019, Juanfran joined São Paulo FC on a contract running until December 2020. He became the second Spanish footballer to play for the Brazilian club, after Fernando Carazzo Castro in 1936. He made his debut in the Campeonato Brasileiro Série A fifteen days later, a 1–0 home victory over Ceará Sporting Club.

In February 2021 – with his second season having overrun due to the COVID-19 pandemic – Juanfran was released, having totalled 56 games for the Tricolor. Having retired, he returned to Spain and joined the Intercity futsal club in his hometown in July.

== International career ==
=== Youth ===
Juanfran had an extraordinary performance at the 2004 UEFA European Under-19 Championship, as Spain won the tournament and the player received the Golden Player award. In a rare achievement, he took part in two FIFA World Youth Championships, the first in the United Arab Emirates where the national team took the silver medal; in the 2005 edition they reached the quarter-finals, eventually ousted by winners Argentina.

=== Senior ===
Juanfran debuted for the non-FIFA recognized Valencian Community autonomous football team on 28 December 2005, scoring and winning against Colombia.

Juanfran made his full side debut on 26 May 2012, playing the entire match in a 2–0 friendly win with Serbia in St. Gallen, as a right-back. He was selected by manager Vicente del Bosque for his squad for UEFA Euro 2012, being an unused player as Spain won the tournament in Poland and Ukraine.

On 16 November 2013, Juanfran scored his only goal, playing the entire 2–1 friendly victory in Equatorial Guinea. However, this match was ruled invalid by FIFA as they had not been notified early enough that the referee would be from Equatorial Guinea.

Juanfran was named in Spain's 30-man provisional squad for the 2014 FIFA World Cup, and was also included in the final list. With the country already eliminated, he made his tournament debut in the last group game against Australia, playing the whole 90 minutes and assisting David Villa for the first goal of a 3–0 win.

Juanfran featured in the roster for Euro 2016, where he played all of his team's four games. After two years in the international wilderness, in October 2018 the 33-year-old stated that he was still available for selection by the national side.

== Style of play ==
A former winger, Juanfran usually played as a right-back. While an accomplished defender, he was also known for his ability to get forward and provide accurate crosses for teammates inside the box.

== Personal life ==
Juanfran married Verónica Sierras, with whom he had two children, Óliver and Alexia.

== Career statistics ==
=== Club ===
Appearances and goals by club, season and competition
Club	Season	League			Cups		Continental		Total	
Club	Season	Division	Apps	Goals	Apps	Goals	Apps	Goals	Apps	Goals
Real Madrid	2003–04	La Liga	5	0	3	0	0	0	8	0
Real Madrid	2004–05	La Liga	1	0	2	0	0	0	3	0
Real Madrid	Total		6	0	5	0	0	0	11	0
Espanyol	2005–06	La Liga	30	1	6	0	0	0	36	1
Osasuna	2006–07	La Liga	28	2	4	0	0	0	32	2
Osasuna	2007–08	La Liga	34	3	2	0	0	0	36	3
Osasuna	2008–09	La Liga	35	2	1	0	0	0	36	2
Osasuna	2009–10	La Liga	33	4	3	0	0	0	36	4
Osasuna	2010–11	La Liga	18	1	0	0	0	0	18	1
Osasuna	Total		148	12	10	0	0	0	158	12
Atlético Madrid	2010–11	La Liga	15	1	2	0	0	0	17	1
Atlético Madrid	2011–12	La Liga	26	0	2	0	16	1	44	1
Atlético Madrid	2012–13	La Liga	35	1	6	0	4	0	45	1
Atlético Madrid	2013–14	La Liga	35	0	8	0	12	0	55	0
Atlético Madrid	2014–15	La Liga	35	0	5	0	10	0	50	0
Atlético Madrid	2015–16	La Liga	35	1	1	0	12	0	48	1
Atlético Madrid	2016–17	La Liga	23	0	7	2	6	0	36	2
Atlético Madrid	2017–18	La Liga	17	0	3	0	10	0	30	0
Atlético Madrid	2018–19	La Liga	22	0	2	0	6	0	30	0
Atlético Madrid	Total		243	3	36	2	76	1	355	6
São Paulo	2019	Série A	17	0	0	0	0	0	17	0
São Paulo	2020	Série A	23	0	4	0	2	0	29	0
São Paulo	Total		40	0	4	0	2	0	46	0
Career total			448	16	57	2	77	1	581	19

=== International ===
Appearances and goals by national team and year
National team	Year	Apps	Goals
Spain	2012	5	0
Spain	2013	2	1
Spain	2014	5	0
Spain	2015	4	0
Spain	2016	6	0
Total		22	1

Scores and results list Spain's goal tally first, score column indicates score after each Juanfran goal.

Goal	Date	Venue	Opponent	Score	Result	Competition
1.	16 November 2013	Estadio de Malabo, Malabo, Equatorial Guinea	Equatorial Guinea	2–1	2–1	Friendly

== Honours ==
Espanyol

- Copa del Rey: 2005–06

Atlético Madrid

- La Liga: 2013–14
- Copa del Rey: 2012–13
- Supercopa de España: 2014; runner-up: 2013
- UEFA Europa League: 2011–12, 2017–18
- UEFA Super Cup: 2012, 2018
- UEFA Champions League runner-up: 2013–14, 2015–16

Spain U19

- UEFA European Under-19 Championship: 2004

Spain U20

- FIFA World Youth Championship runner-up: 2003

Spain

- UEFA European Championship: 2012

Individual

- La Liga Team of the Season: 2013–14
- UEFA Champions League Squad of the Season: 2015–16
- UEFA La Liga Team of the Season: 2015–16

== See also ==
- List of Atlético Madrid players (+100)
- List of La Liga players (400+ appearances)
- List of footballers with 400 or more La Liga appearances
