= Kurt Tschenscher =

German football referee (1928–2014)

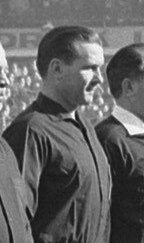
- Tschenscher in 1963
- Full name: Kurt Waldemar Tschenscher
- Born: 5 October 1928; Schimischow, Weimar Germany (today Szymiszów, Poland)
- Died: 13 August 2014 (aged 85)

Domestic
Years	League	Role
1948–1953	German Football Association	Referee

International
Years	League	Role
1958–1974	FIFA listed	Referee

Kurt Waldemar Tschenscher (5 October 1928 – 13 August 2014) was a German football referee.

== Career ==
Born in Schimischow, Weimar Germany (today Szymiszów, Poland), Tschenscher took up refereeing in 1948 and by 1953 he was part of the German Football Association's group of top referees. Within another five years, he was promoted to the FIFA list of international referees. In October 1959, he refereed the second leg of Yugoslavia's 1960 European Nations' Cup first round win over Bulgaria. In September 1962, he took charge of the replay of the 1962 European Cup Winners' Cup final, in which Atlético Madrid beat Fiorentina 3–0.

By 1966, Tschenscher was one of the top referees in Europe, a fact reflected in his appointment to the first leg of the 1965–66 European Cup semi-final between Partizan and Manchester United, and then a group stage match between Brazil and Bulgaria at the 1966 FIFA World Cup. The following season, he was named as the referee for the 1967 European Cup final between Celtic and Internazionale.

He was appointed to quarter-finals at both Euro 1968 and Euro 1972, and a semi-final at Euro 1968, as well as the opening group stage game between Mexico and the Soviet Union at the 1970 World Cup, which saw him become the first referee to show a yellow card in a match. He also refereed a second-round game at the 1974 World Cup. Thus he is the only referee that was nominated by the FIFA for three World Cups. In total he was a FIFA referee for 17 years, which is the record in FIFA history.
