= Luigi Milan =

Italian footballer and manager (1937–2023)

Luigi Milan (10 December 1937 – 8 December 2023) was an Italian footballer who played as a midfielder, later a manager. He totalled 219 games and 30 goals in Serie A for Udinese, Fiorentina, Catania and Atalanta.

== Career ==
Milan was born in Mirano, Province of Venice. He began his career at nearby Venezia in Serie B from 1956 to 1959. His first Serie A season was 1959–60 with ten goals for Udinese, earning a move to Fiorentina.

With Fiorentina, Milan won the UEFA Cup Winners' Cup in its inaugural edition, 1960–61. In the two-legged final against Rangers of Scotland, he scored both goals of the first leg in Glasgow, plus one more in the 2–1 win in the second leg. It was the first time that an Italian team won a UEFA competition. In the same season, he was top scorer with four goals as they won the Coppa Italia, including against Juventus (semi-final) and Lazio (final).

Milan left Fiorentina in 1962, and following one year with Catania, he joined Atalanta for a six-season spell. From 1973 to 1990 he worked as a manager, starting at Olbia and Prato.

Milan died on 8 December 2023, two days before his 86th birthday. Atalanta wore black armbands in his memory the following day. His funeral took place at the Chiesa dei Sette Santi Fondatori (Firenze).
