= Atlético Madrid in international football =

Spanish club in European football

Atlético Madrid in European football
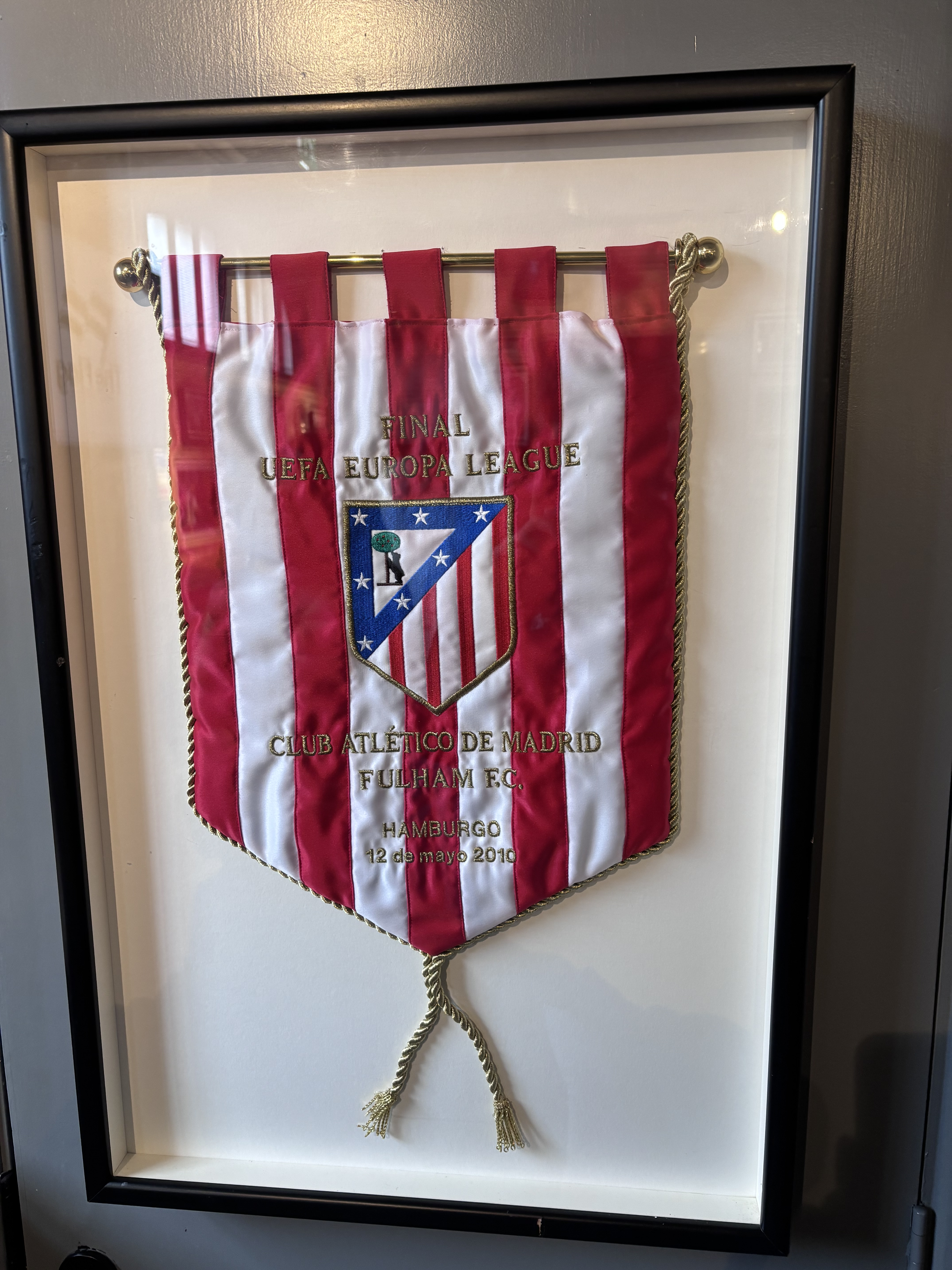
- Atlético Madrid's 2010 UEFA Europa League final pennant
- Club: Atlético Madrid
- Seasons played: 53
- First entry: 1958–59 European Cup
- Latest entry: 2026–27 UEFA Champions League

Titles
- Europa League: 3: 2010; 2012; 2018
- Cup Winners' Cup: 1: 1962
- Super Cup: 3: 2010; 2012; 2018
- Intercontinental Cup: 1: 1974

These are the matches of Atlético Madrid playing in Europe.

== European Cup/UEFA Champions League ==
Season	Round	Opponent	Home	Away	Agg.
1958–59	PR	(Republic of Ireland) Drumcondra	8–0	5–1	13–1
1958–59	1R	(Bulgaria) CSKA Sofia	2–1	0–1	2–2
1958–59	QF	(West Germany) Schalke 04	3–0	1–1	4–1
1958–59	SF	(Spain) Real Madrid	1–0	1–2	2–2
1966–67	1R	(Sweden) Malmö FF	3–1	2–0	5–1
1966–67	2R	(Socialist Federal Republic of Yugoslavia) Vojvodina	2–0	1–3	3–3
1970–71	1R	Austria Wien	2–0	2–1	4–1
1970–71	2R	(Italy) Cagliari	3–0	1–2	4–2
1970–71	QF	(Poland) Legia Warsaw	1–0	1–2	2–2 (a)
1970–71	SF	(Netherlands) Ajax	1–0	1–3	2–3
1973–74	1R	(Turkey) Galatasaray	0–0	1–0	1–0
1973–74	2R	(Romania) Dinamo București	2–2	2–0	4–2
1973–74	QF	(Socialist Federal Republic of Yugoslavia) Red Star Belgrade	0–0	2–0	2–0
1973–74	SF	(Scotland) Celtic	2–0	0–0	2–0
1973–74	F	(West Germany) Bayern Munich	1–1 (N); 0–4 (N)		
1977–78	1R	(Romania) Dinamo București	2–0	1–2	3–2
1977–78	2R	(France) Nantes	2–1	1–1	3–2
1977–78	QF	(Belgium) Club Brugge	3–2	0–2	3–4
1996–97	GS	(Romania) Steaua București	4–0	1–1	1st out of 4
1996–97	GS	(Poland) Widzew Łódź	1–0	4–1	1st out of 4
1996–97	GS	(Germany) Borussia Dortmund	0–1	2–1	1st out of 4
1996–97	QF	(Netherlands) Ajax	2–3	1–1	3–4
2008–09	3QR	(Germany) Schalke 04	4–0	0–1	4–1
2008–09	GS	(Netherlands) PSV Eindhoven	2–1	3–0	2nd out of 4
2008–09	GS	(France) Marseille	2–1	0–0	2nd out of 4
2008–09	GS	(England) Liverpool	1–1	1–1	2nd out of 4
2008–09	Ro16	(Portugal) Porto	2–2	0–0	2–2 (a)
2009–10	POR	(Greece) Panathinaikos	2–0	3–2	5–2
2009–10	GS	(Cyprus) APOEL	0–0	1–1	3rd out of 4
2009–10	GS	(Portugal) Porto	0–3	0–2	3rd out of 4
2009–10	GS	(England) Chelsea	2–2	0–4	3rd out of 4
2013–14	GS	(Russia) Zenit Saint Petersburg	3–1	1–1	1st out of 4
2013–14	GS	(Portugal) Porto	2–0	2–1	1st out of 4
2013–14	GS	Austria Wien	4–0	3–0	1st out of 4
2013–14	Ro16	(Italy) Milan	4–1	1–0	5–1
2013–14	QF	(Spain) Barcelona	1–0	1–1	2–1
2013–14	SF	(England) Chelsea	0–0	3–1	3–1
2013–14	F	(Spain) Real Madrid	1–4 (a.e.t.) (N)		
2014–15	GS	(Greece) Olympiacos	4–0	2–3	1st out of 4
2014–15	GS	(Italy) Juventus	1–0	0–0	1st out of 4
2014–15	GS	(Sweden) Malmö FF	5–0	2–0	1st out of 4
2014–15	Ro16	(Germany) Bayer Leverkusen	1–0 (a.e.t.)	0–1	1–1 (3–2 p)
2014–15	QF	(Spain) Real Madrid	0–0	0–1	0–1
2015–16	GS	(Turkey) Galatasaray	2–0	2–0	1st out of 4
2015–16	GS	(Portugal) Benfica	1–2	2–1	1st out of 4
2015–16	GS	(Kazakhstan) Astana	4–0	0–0	1st out of 4
2015–16	Ro16	(Netherlands) PSV Eindhoven	0–0 (a.e.t.)	0–0	0–0 (8–7 p)
2015–16	QF	(Spain) Barcelona	2–0	1–2	3–2
2015–16	SF	(Germany) Bayern Munich	1–0	1–2	2–2 (a)
2015–16	F	(Spain) Real Madrid	1–1 (a.e.t.) (3–5 p) (N)		
2016–17	GS	(Netherlands) PSV Eindhoven	2–0	1–0	1st out of 4
2016–17	GS	(Germany) Bayern Munich	1–0	0–1	1st out of 4
2016–17	GS	(Russia) Rostov	2–1	1–0	1st out of 4
2016–17	Ro16	(Germany) Bayer Leverkusen	0–0	4–2	4–2
2016–17	QF	(England) Leicester City	1–0	1–1	2–1
2016–17	SF	(Spain) Real Madrid	2–1	0–3	2–4
2017–18	GS	(England) Chelsea	1–2	1–1	3rd out of 4
2017–18	GS	(Italy) Roma	2–0	0–0	3rd out of 4
2017–18	GS	(Azerbaijan) Qarabağ	1–1	0–0	3rd out of 4
2018–19	GS	(France) Monaco	2–0	2–1	2nd out of 4
2018–19	GS	(Belgium) Club Brugge	3–1	0–0	2nd out of 4
2018–19	GS	(Germany) Borussia Dortmund	2–0	0–4	2nd out of 4
2018–19	Ro16	(Italy) Juventus	2–0	0–3	2–3
2019–20	GS	(Italy) Juventus	2–2	0–1	2nd out of 4
2019–20	GS	(Germany) Bayer Leverkusen	1–0	1–2	2nd out of 4
2019–20	GS	(Russia) Lokomotiv Moscow	2–0	2–0	2nd out of 4
2019–20	Ro16	(England) Liverpool	1–0	3–2 (a.e.t.)	4–2
2019–20	QF	(Germany) RB Leipzig	1–2 (N)		
2020–21	GS	(Germany) Bayern Munich	1–1	0–4	2nd out of 4
2020–21	GS	(Austria) Red Bull Salzburg	3–2	2–0	2nd out of 4
2020–21	GS	(Russia) Lokomotiv Moscow	0–0	1–1	2nd out of 4
2020–21	Ro16	(England) Chelsea	0–1	0–2	0–3
2021–22	GS	(Portugal) Porto	0–0	3–1	2nd out of 4
2021–22	GS	(Italy) Milan	0–1	2–1	2nd out of 4
2021–22	GS	(England) Liverpool	2–3	0–2	2nd out of 4
2021–22	Ro16	(England) Manchester United	1–1	1–0	2–1
2021–22	QF	(England) Manchester City	0–0	0–1	0–1
2022–23	GS	(Portugal) Porto	2–1	1–2	4th out of 4
2022–23	GS	(Germany) Bayer Leverkusen	2–2	0–2	4th out of 4
2022–23	GS	(Belgium) Club Brugge	0–0	0–2	4th out of 4
2023–24	GS	(Italy) Lazio	2–0	1–1	1st out of 4
2023–24	GS	(Netherlands) Feyenoord	3–2	3–1	1st out of 4
2023–24	GS	(Scotland) Celtic	6–0	2–2	1st out of 4
2023–24	Ro16	(Italy) Inter Milan	2–1 (a.e.t.)	0–1	2–2 (3–2 p)
2023–24	QF	(Germany) Borussia Dortmund	2–1	2–4	4–5
2024–25	LP	(Germany) RB Leipzig	2–1	—N/a	5th out of 36
2024–25	LP	(Portugal) Benfica	—N/a	0–4	5th out of 36
2024–25	LP	(France) Lille	1–3	—N/a	5th out of 36
2024–25	LP	(France) Paris Saint-Germain	—N/a	2–1	5th out of 36
2024–25	LP	(Czech Republic) Sparta Prague	—N/a	6–0	5th out of 36
2024–25	LP	(Slovakia) Slovan Bratislava	3–1	—N/a	5th out of 36
2024–25	LP	(Germany) Bayer Leverkusen	2–1	—N/a	5th out of 36
2024–25	LP	(Austria) Red Bull Salzburg	—N/a	4–1	5th out of 36
2024–25	Ro16	(Spain) Real Madrid	1–0 (a.e.t.)	1–2	2–2 (2–4 p)
2025–26	LP	(England) Liverpool	—N/a	2–3	14th out of 36
2025–26	LP	(Germany) Eintracht Frankfurt	5–1	—N/a	14th out of 36
2025–26	LP	(England) Arsenal	—N/a	0–4	14th out of 36
2025–26	LP	(Belgium) Union Saint-Gilloise	3–1	—N/a	14th out of 36
2025–26	LP	(Italy) Inter Milan	2–1	—N/a	14th out of 36
2025–26	LP	(Netherlands) PSV Eindhoven	—N/a	3–2	14th out of 36
2025–26	LP	(Turkey) Galatasaray	—N/a	1–1	14th out of 36
2025–26	LP	(Norway) Bodø/Glimt	1–2	—N/a	14th out of 36
2025–26	KPO	(Belgium) Club Brugge	4–1	3–3	7–4
2025–26	Ro16	(England) Tottenham Hotspur	5–2	2–3	7–5
2025–26	QF	(Spain) Barcelona	1–2	2–0	3–2
2025–26	SF	(England) Arsenal	1–1	0–1	1–2
2026–27	LP	(England) Liverpool	—N/a	1–2	TBD
2026–27	LP	(England) Manchester United	2–0	—N/a	TBD
2026–27	LP	(Germany) VfB Stuttgart	—N/a	1–1	TBD
2026–27	LP	(Germany) Bayern Munich		—N/a	TBD
2026–27	LP	(Norway) Viking		—N/a	TBD
2026–27	LP	(Netherlands) PSV Eindhoven	—N/a		TBD
2026–27	LP	(Norway) Bodø/Glimt	—N/a		TBD
2026–27	LP	(Turkey) Fenerbahçe		—N/a	TBD

== European Cup Winners' Cup/UEFA Cup Winners' Cup ==
Season	Round	Opponent	Home	Away	Agg.
1961–62	PR	(France) Sedan	4–1	3–2	7–3
1961–62	1R	(England) Leicester City	2–0	1–1	3–1
1961–62	QF	(West Germany) Werder Bremen	3–1	1–1	4–2
1961–62	SF	(East Germany) Motor Jena	4–0	1–0	5–0
1961–62	F	(Italy) Fiorentina	1–1 (N); 3–0 (N)		
1962–63	PR	Bye			
1962–63	1R	(Malta) Hibernians	4–0	1–0	5–0
1962–63	QF	(Bulgaria) Botev Plovdiv	4–0	1–1	5–1
1962–63	SF	(West Germany) 1. FC Nürnberg	2–0	1–2	3–2
1962–63	F	(England) Tottenham Hotspur	1–5 (N)		
1965–66	1R	(Socialist Federal Republic of Yugoslavia) Dinamo Zagreb	4–0	1–0	5–0
1965–66	2R	(Romania) Știința Cluj	4–0	2–0	6–0
1965–66	QF	(West Germany) Borussia Dortmund	1–1	0–1	1–2
1972–73	1R	(France) Bastia	2–1	0–0	2–1
1972–73	2R	(Soviet Union) Spartak Moscow	3–4	2–1	5–5 (a)
1975–76	1R	(Switzerland) Basel	1–1	2–1	3–2
1975–76	2R	(West Germany) Eintracht Frankfurt	1–2	0–1	1–3
1976–77	1R	(Austria) Rapid Wien	1–1	2–1	3–2
1976–77	2R	(Socialist Federal Republic of Yugoslavia) Hajduk Split	2–1	1–0	3–1
1976–77	QF	(Bulgaria) Levski Spartak	2–0	1–2	3–2
1976–77	SF	(West Germany) Hamburger SV	3–1	0–3	3–4
1985–86	1R	(Scotland) Celtic	1–1	2–1	3–2
1985–86	2R	(Wales) Bangor City	1–0	2–0	3–0
1985–86	QF	(Socialist Federal Republic of Yugoslavia) Red Star Belgrade	1–1	2–0	3–1
1985–86	SF	(West Germany) Bayer Uerdingen	1–0	3–2	4–2
1985–86	F	(Soviet Union) Dynamo Kiev	0–3 (N)		
1991–92	1R	(Norway) Fyllingen	7–2	1–0	8–2
1991–92	2R	(England) Manchester United	3–0	1–1	4–1
1991–92	QF	(Belgium) Club Brugge	3–2	1–2	4–4 (a)
1992–93	1R	(Slovenia) Maribor	6–1	3–0	9–1
1992–93	2R	(Turkey) Trabzonspor	0–0	2–0	2–0
1992–93	QF	(Greece) Olympiacos	3–1	1–1	4–2
1992–93	SF	(Italy) Parma	1–2	1–0	2–2 (a)

== Inter-Cities Fairs Cup ==
Season	Round	Opponent	Home	Away	Agg.
1963–64	1R	(France) Sedan	2–1	0–0	2–1
1963–64	2R	(Italy) Juventus	1–2	0–1	1–3
1964–65	1R	(Switzerland) Servette	6–1	2–2	8–3
1964–65	2R	(Republic of Ireland) Shelbourne	1–0	1–0	2–0
1964–65	3R	(Belgium) RFC Liège	2–0	0–1	2–1
1964–65	QF	Bye			
1964–65	SF	(Italy) Juventus	3–1	1–3	4–4
1967–68	1R	(Austria) Wiener Sport-Club	2–1	5–2	7–3
1967–68	2R	(Turkey) Göztepe	2–0	0–3	2–3
1968–69	1R	(Belgium) KSV Waregem	2–1	0–1	2–2 (a)

== UEFA Cup/UEFA Europa League ==
Season	Round	Opponent	Home	Away	Agg.
1971–72	1R	(Greece) Panionios	2–1	0–1	2–2 (a)
1974–75	1R	(Denmark) KB	4–0	2–3	6–3
1974–75	2R	(England) Derby County	2–2	2–2	4–4
1979–80	1R	(East Germany) Dynamo Dresden	1–2	0–3	1–5
1981–82	1R	(Portugal) Boavista	3–1	1–4	4–5
1983–84	1R	(Netherlands) Groningen	2–1	0–3	2–4
1984–85	1R	(Switzerland) Sion	2–3	0–1	2–4
1986–87	1R	(West Germany) Werder Bremen	2–0	1–2	3–2
1986–87	2R	(Portugal) Vitória de Guimarães	1–0	0–2	1–2
1988–89	1R	(Netherlands) Groningen	2–1	0–1	2–2 (a)
1989–90	1R	(Italy) Fiorentina	1–0	0–1	1–1
1990–91	1R	(Romania) Politehnica Timișoara	1–0	0–2	1–2
1993–94	1R	(Scotland) Heart of Midlothian	3–0	1–2	4–2
1993–94	2R	(Greece) OFI	1–0	0–2	1–2
1997–98	1R	(England) Leicester City	2–1	2–0	4–1
1997–98	2R	(Greece) PAOK	5–2	4–4	9–6
1997–98	3R	Croatia Zagreb	1–0	1–1	2–1
1997–98	QF	(England) Aston Villa	1–0	1–2	2–2 (a)
1997–98	SF	(Italy) Lazio	0–1	0–0	0–1
1998–99	1R	(Federal Republic of Yugoslavia) Obilić	2–0	1–0	3–0
1998–99	2R	(Bulgaria) CSKA Sofia	1–0	4–2	5–2
1998–99	3R	(Spain) Real Sociedad	4–1	1–2	5–3
1998–99	QF	(Italy) Roma	2–1	2–1	4–2
1998–99	SF	(Italy) Parma	1–3	1–2	2–5
1999–2000	1R	(Turkey) Ankaragücü	3–0	0–1	3–1
1999–2000	2R	(Poland) Amica Wronki	1–0	4–1	5–1
1999–2000	3R	(Germany) VfL Wolfsburg	2–1	3–2	5–3
1999–2000	4R	(France) Lens	2–2	2–4	4–6
2007–08	2QR	(Serbia) Vojvodina	3–0	2–1	5–1
2007–08	1R	(Turkey) Kayseri Erciyesspor	4–0	5–0	9–0
2007–08	GS	(Russia) Lokomotiv Moscow	N/A	3–3	1st out of 5
2007–08	GS	(Scotland) Aberdeen	2–0	N/A	1st out of 5
2007–08	GS	(Denmark) Copenhagen	N/A	2–0	1st out of 5
2007–08	GS	(Greece) Panathinaikos	2–1	N/A	1st out of 5
2007–08	Ro32	(England) Bolton Wanderers	0–0	0–1	0–1
2009–10	Ro32	(Turkey) Galatasaray	1–1	2–1	3–2
2009–10	Ro16	(Portugal) Sporting CP	0–0	2–2	2–2 (a)
2009–10	QF	(Spain) Valencia	0–0	2–2	2–2 (a)
2009–10	SF	(England) Liverpool	1–0	1–2	2–2 (a)
2009–10	F	(England) Fulham	2–1 (a.e.t.) (N)		
2010–11	GS	(Greece) Aris	2–3	0–1	3rd out of 4
2010–11	GS	(Germany) Bayer Leverkusen	1–1	1–1	3rd out of 4
2010–11	GS	(Norway) Rosenborg	3–0	2–1	3rd out of 4
2011–12	3QR	(Norway) Strømsgodset	2–1	2–0	4–1
2011–12	POR	(Portugal) Vitória de Guimarães	2–0	4–0	6–0
2011–12	GS	(Scotland) Celtic	2–0	1–0	1st out of 4
2011–12	GS	(France) Rennes	3–1	1–1	1st out of 4
2011–12	GS	(Italy) Udinese	4–0	0–2	1st out of 4
2011–12	Ro32	(Italy) Lazio	1–0	3–1	4–1
2011–12	Ro16	(Turkey) Beşiktaş	3–1	3–0	6–1
2011–12	QF	(Germany) Hannover 96	2–1	2–1	4–2
2011–12	SF	(Spain) Valencia	4–2	1–0	5–2
2011–12	F	(Spain) Athletic Bilbao	3–0 (N)		
2012–13	GS	(Israel) Hapoel Tel Aviv	1–0	3–0	2nd out of 4
2012–13	GS	(Czech Republic) Viktoria Plzeň	1–0	0–1	2nd out of 4
2012–13	GS	(Portugal) Académica	2–1	0–2	2nd out of 4
2012–13	Ro32	(Russia) Rubin Kazan	0–2	1–0	1–2
2017–18	Ro32	(Denmark) Copenhagen	1–0	4–1	5–1
2017–18	Ro16	(Russia) Lokomotiv Moscow	3–0	5–1	8–1
2017–18	QF	(Portugal) Sporting CP	2–0	0–1	2–1
2017–18	SF	(England) Arsenal	1–0	1–1	2–1
2017–18	F	(France) Marseille	3–0 (N)		

== FIFA Club World Cup ==
Season	Round	Opponent	Score
2025	GS	(France) Paris Saint-Germain	0–4
2025	GS	(United States) Seattle Sounders FC	3–1
2025	GS	(Brazil) Botafogo	1–0

== Finals ==
Year	Competition	Opposing Team	Score	Venue
1962	Cup Winners' Cup	(Italy) Fiorentina	1–1 (a.e.t.)	(Scotland) Hampden Park, Glasgow
1962	Cup Winners' Cup	(Italy) Fiorentina	3–0 (Replay)	(West Germany) Neckarstadion, Stuttgart
1963	Cup Winners' Cup	(England) Tottenham Hotspur	1–5	(Netherlands) Feijenoord Stadion, Rotterdam
1974	European Cup	(West Germany) Bayern Munich	1–1 (a.e.t.)	(Belgium) Heysel Stadium, Brussels
1974	European Cup	(West Germany) Bayern Munich	0–4 (Replay)	(Belgium) Heysel Stadium, Brussels
1974	Intercontinental Cup	(Argentina) Independiente	0–1	Two-legged
1974	Intercontinental Cup	(Argentina) Independiente	2–0	Two-legged
1986	Cup Winners' Cup	(Soviet Union) Dynamo Kiev	0–3	(France) Stade de Gerland, Lyon
2004	Intertoto Cup	(Spain) Villarreal	2–2 (a.e.t.) (1–3 on penalties)	Two-legged
2007	Intertoto Cup	(Romania) Gloria Bistrița	2–2 (a)	Two-legged
2010	Europa League	(England) Fulham	2–1 (a.e.t.)	(Germany) HSH Nordbank Arena, Hamburg
2010	Super Cup	(Italy) Internazionale	2–0	Stade Louis II, Monaco
2012	Europa League	(Spain) Athletic Bilbao	3–0	(Romania) Arena Națională, Bucharest
2012	Super Cup	(England) Chelsea	4–1	Stade Louis II, Monaco
2014	Champions League	(Spain) Real Madrid	1–4 (a.e.t.)	(Portugal) Estádio da Luz, Lisbon
2016	Champions League	(Spain) Real Madrid	1–1 (a.e.t.) (3–5 on penalties)	(Italy) San Siro, Milan
2018	Europa League	(France) Marseille	3–0	(France) Parc Olympique Lyonnais, Décines-Charpieu
2018	Super Cup	(Spain) Real Madrid	4–2 (a.e.t.)	(Estonia) A. Le Coq Arena, Tallinn

=== Lost semi-finals ===
Year	Competition	Opposing Team	Score	Final venue	Other Semi-finalists
1959	European Cup	(Spain) Real Madrid	2–2 (Replay 1–2)	(West Germany) Neckarstadion	(France) Reims (Switzerland) Young Boys
1965	Inter-Cities Fairs Cup	(Italy) Juventus	4–4 (Replay 1–3)	(Italy) Comunale Stadium	(Hungary) Ferencváros (England) Manchester United
1971	European Cup	(Netherlands) Ajax	1–3	(England) Wembley Stadium	(Greece) Panathinaikos (Socialist Federal Republic of Yugoslavia) Red Star Belgrade
1977	Cup Winners' Cup	(West Germany) Hamburger SV	3–4	(Netherlands) Olympic Stadium	(Belgium) Anderlecht (Italy) Napoli
1993	Cup Winners' Cup	(Italy) Parma	2–2 (a)	(England) Wembley Stadium	(Belgium) Antwerp (Russia) Spartak Moscow
1998	UEFA Cup	(Italy) Lazio	0–1	(France) Parc des Princes	(Italy) Internazionale (Russia) Spartak Moscow
1999	UEFA Cup	(Italy) Parma	2–5	(Russia) Luzhniki Stadium	(France) Marseille (Italy) Bologna
2017	Champions League	(Spain) Real Madrid	2–4	(Wales) Millennium Stadium	(Italy) Juventus (France) Monaco
2026	Champions League	(England) Arsenal	1–2	(Hungary) Puskás Aréna	(Germany) Bayern Munich (France) Paris Saint-Germain

== Overall record ==
=== By competition ===
As of 3 November 2026

Competition	Pld	W	D	L	GF	GA	GD	Win%
UEFA Champions League / European Cup	200	97	48	55	310	212	+98	48.50
UEFA Europa League / UEFA Cup	117	69	17	31	201	117	+84	58.97
UEFA Cup Winners' Cup / European Cup Winners' Cup	62	38	13	11	118	57	+61	61.29
Inter-Cities Fairs Cup	19	10	2	7	31	23	+8	52.63
UEFA Super Cup / European Super Cup	3	3	0	0	10	3	+7	100.00
UEFA Intertoto Cup	8	5	0	3	13	9	+4	62.50
Intercontinental Cup	2	1	0	1	2	1	+1	50.00
FIFA Club World Cup	3	2	0	1	4	5	−1	66.67
Latin Cup	4	2	0	2	8	10	−2	50.00
Total	418	227	80	111	697	437	+260	54.31

=== By country ===
Country	Pld	W	D	L	GF	GA	GD	Win% (Note: Win% is rounded to two decimal places)	Note
Argentina	2	1	0	1	2	1	+1	50.00	
Austria	11	10	1	0	30	9	+21	90.91	
Belgium	11	5	2	4	19	16	+3	45.45	
Brazil	1	1	0	0	1	0	+1	100.00	
Bulgaria	9	6	1	2	18	7	+11	66.67	
Croatia	6	5	1	0	10	1	+9	83.33	(Note: Including teams from Yugoslavia, FR Yugoslavia and Serbia and Montenegro, as appropriate to successor state)
Czech Republic	5	3	0	2	11	5	+6	60.00	
Cyprus	2	0	2	0	1	1	+0	0.00	
Denmark	5	4	0	1	13	4	+9	80.00	
England	42	15	13	14	52	53	−1	35.71	
France	18	9	6	3	30	24	+6	50.00	
Germany	43	19	9	15	65	58	+7	44.19	(Note: Including teams from East Germany and West Germany)
Greece	13	7	2	4	25	19	+6	53.85	
Israel	2	2	0	0	4	0	+4	100.00	
Italy	33	17	3	13	47	34	+13	51.52	
Malta	2	2	0	0	5	0	+5	100.00	
Netherlands	12	7	1	4	19	18	+1	58.33	
Norway	7	6	0	1	18	6	+12	85.71	
Poland	6	5	0	1	12	4	+8	83.33	
Portugal	23	10	5	8	30	28	+2	43.48	
Republic of Ireland	4	4	0	0	15	1	+14	100.00	
Romania	12	7	2	3	21	8	+13	58.33	
Russia	10	6	3	1	17	9	+8	60.00	(Note: Including teams from the Soviet Union, as appropriate to successor state)
Scotland	11	7	3	1	22	6	+16	63.64	
Serbia	11	7	2	2	23	9	+14	63.64	
Slovakia	1	1	0	0	3	1	+2	100.00	
Spain	19	9	3	7	26	20	+6	47.37	
Sweden	2	1	0	1	2	1	+1	50.00	
Switzerland	2	1	0	1	2	1	+1	50.00	
Turkey	15	10	4	1	29	5	+24	66.67	
Ukraine	1	0	0	1	0	3	−3	0.00	
United States	1	1	0	0	3	1	+2	100.00	
