= ACF Fiorentina in European football =

Italian club in European football

- Club: ACF Fiorentina
- Seasons played: 34
- First entry: 1956–57 European Cup
- Latest entry: 2025–26 UEFA Conference League

Titles
- Cup Winners' Cup: 1: 1961

These are the matches Fiorentina have played in European football competitions. The club's first entry into European competitions was in the 1956–57 European Cup. Despite reaching six European finals, the only trophy won by Fiorentina was the 1960–61 European Cup Winners' Cup.

== UEFA-organised seasonal competitions ==
Fiorentina's score listed first.

=== European Cup / UEFA Champions League ===
Season	Round	Opposition	Home	Away	Aggregate
1956–57	First round	(Sweden) IFK Norrköping	1–0	1–1	2–1
1956–57	Quarter-finals	(Switzerland) Grasshopper	3–1	2–2	5–3
1956–57	Semi-finals	(Socialist Federal Republic of Yugoslavia) Red Star Belgrade	0–0	1–0	1–0
1956–57	Final	(Spain) Real Madrid	0–2		
1969–70	First round	(Sweden) Östers	1–0	2–1	3–1
1969–70	Second round	(Soviet Union) Dynamo Kyiv	0–0	2–1	2–1
1969–70	Quarter-finals	(Scotland) Celtic	1–0	0–3	1–3
1999–2000	Third qualifying round	(Poland) Widzew Łódź	3–1	2–0	5–1
1999–2000	First group stage	(England) Arsenal	0–0	1–0	2nd
1999–2000	First group stage	(Spain) Barcelona	3–3	2–4	2nd
1999–2000	First group stage	(Sweden) AIK	0–0	3–0	2nd
1999–2000	Second group stage	(England) Manchester United	2–0	1–3	3rd
1999–2000	Second group stage	(France) Bordeaux	3–3	0–0	3rd
1999–2000	Second group stage	(Spain) Valencia	1–0	0–2	3rd
2008–09	Third qualifying round	(Czech Republic) Slavia Prague	2–0	0–0	2–0
2008–09	Group stage	(France) Lyon	1–2	2–2	3rd
2008–09	Group stage	(Romania) Steaua București	0–0	1–0	3rd
2008–09	Group stage	(Germany) Bayern Munich	1–1	0–3	3rd
2009–10	Play-off round	(Portugal) Sporting CP	1–1	2–2	3–3 (a)
2009–10	Group stage	(France) Lyon	1–0	0–1	1st
2009–10	Group stage	(England) Liverpool	2–0	2–1	1st
2009–10	Group stage	(Hungary) Debrecen	5–2	4–3	1st
2009–10	Round of 16	(Germany) Bayern Munich	3–2	1–2	4–4 (a)

=== European Cup Winners' Cup / UEFA Cup Winners' Cup ===
Season	Round	Opposition	Home	Away	Aggregate
1960–61	Quarter-finals	(Switzerland) Luzern	6–2	3–0	9–2
1960–61	Semi-finals	(Socialist Federal Republic of Yugoslavia) Dinamo Zagreb	3–0	1–2	4–2
1960–61	Final	(Scotland) Rangers	2–1	2–0	4–1
1961–62	First round	(Austria) Rapid Wien	3–1	6–2	9–3
1961–62	Quarter-finals	(Czechoslovakia) Dynamo Žilina	2–0	2–3	4–3
1961–62	Semi-finals	(Hungary) Újpesti Dózsa	2–0	1–0	3–0
1961–62	Final	(Spain) Atlético Madrid	1–1	0–3	1–4
1966–67	First round	(Hungary) Győri	1–0	2–4	3–4
1975–76	First round	(Turkey) Beşiktaş	3–0	3–0	6–0
1975–76	Second round	(East Germany) Zwickau	1–0	0–1	1–1 (4–5 p)
1996–97	First round	(Romania) Gloria Bistriţa	1–0	1–1	2–1
1996–97	Second round	(Czech Republic) Sparta Prague	2–1	1–1	3–2
1996–97	Quarter-finals	(Portugal) Benfica	0–1	2–0	2–1
1996–97	Semi-finals	(Spain) Barcelona	0–2	1–1	1–3

=== UEFA Cup / UEFA Europa League ===
Season	Round	Opposition	Home	Away	Aggregate
1972–73	First round	(Turkey) Eskişehirspor	3–0	2–1	5–1
1972–73	Second round	(Portugal) Vitória de Setúbal	2–1	0–1	2–2 (a)
1973–74	First round	(Romania) Universitatea Craiova	0–0	0–1	0–1
1977–78	First round	(West Germany) Schalke 04	0–3	1–2	1–5
1982–83	First round	(Romania) Universitatea Craiova	1–0	1–3	2–3
1984–85	First round	(Turkey) Fenerbahçe	2–0	1–0	3–0
1984–85	Second round	(Belgium) Anderlecht	1–1	2–6	3–7
1986–87	First round	(Portugal) Boavista	1–0	0–1 (a.e.t.)	1–1 (1–4 p)
1989–90	First round	(Spain) Atlético Madrid	1–0 (a.e.t.)	0–1	1–1 (4–1 p)
1989–90	Second round	(France) Sochaux	0–0	1–1	1–1 (a)
1989–90	Third round	(Soviet Union) Dynamo Kyiv	1–0	0–0	1–0
1989–90	Quarter-finals	(France) Auxerre	1–0	1–0	2–0
1989–90	Semi-finals	(West Germany) Werder Bremen	0–0	1–1	1–1 (a)
1989–90	Final	(Italy) Juventus	0–0	1–3	1–3
1998–99	First round	(Croatia) Hajduk Split	2–1	1–1	3–2
1998–99	Second round	(Switzerland) Grasshopper	0–3	2–0	2–3
2000–01	First round	(Austria) Tirol Innsbruck	2–2	1–3	3–5
2001–02	First round	(Ukraine) Dnipro	2–1	0–0	2–1
2001–02	Second round	(Austria) Tirol Innsbruck	2–0	2–2	4–2
2001–02	Third round	(France) Lille	0–1	0–2	0–3
2007–08	First round	(Netherlands) Groningen	1–1 (a.e.t.)	1–1	2–2 (4–3 p)
2007–08	Group stage	(Spain) Villarreal	—N/a	1–1	2nd
2007–08	Group stage	(Sweden) IF Elfsborg	6–1	—N/a	2nd
2007–08	Group stage	(Greece) AEK Athens	—N/a	1–1	2nd
2007–08	Group stage	(Czech Republic) Mladá Boleslav	2–1	—N/a	2nd
2007–08	Round of 32	(Norway) Rosenborg	2–1	1–0	3–1
2007–08	Round of 16	(England) Everton	2–0	0–2 (a.e.t.)	2–2 (5–4 p)
2007–08	Quarter-finals	(Netherlands) PSV Eindhoven	1–1	2–0	3–1
2007–08	Semi-finals	(Scotland) Rangers	0–0 (a.e.t.)	0–0	0–0 (3–4 p)
2008–09	Round of 32	(Netherlands) Ajax	0–1	1–1	1–2
2013–14	Play-off round	(Switzerland) Grasshopper	0–1	2–1	2–2 (a)
2013–14	Group stage	(Portugal) Paços Ferreira	3–0	0–0	1st
2013–14	Group stage	(Ukraine) Dnipro	2–1	2–1	1st
2013–14	Group stage	(Romania) Pandurii	3–0	2–1	1st
2013–14	Round of 32	(Denmark) Esbjerg	1–1	3–1	4–2
2013–14	Round of 16	(Italy) Juventus	0–1	1–1	1–2
2014–15	Group stage	(France) Guingamp	3–0	2–1	1st
2014–15	Group stage	(Belarus) Dinamo Minsk	1–2	3–0	1st
2014–15	Group stage	(Greece) PAOK	1–1	1–0	1st
2014–15	Round of 32	(England) Tottenham Hotspur	2–0	1–1	3–1
2014–15	Round of 16	(Italy) Roma	1–1	3–0	4–1
2014–15	Quarter-finals	(Ukraine) Dynamo Kyiv	2–0	1–1	3–1
2014–15	Semi-finals	(Spain) Sevilla	0–2	0–3	0–5
2015–16	Group stage	(Switzerland) Basel	1–2	2–2	2nd
2015–16	Group stage	(Portugal) Belenenses	1–0	4–0	2nd
2015–16	Group stage	(Poland) Lech Poznań	1–2	2–0	2nd
2015–16	Round of 32	(England) Tottenham Hotspur	1–1	0–3	1–4
2016–17	Group stage	(Greece) PAOK	2–3	0–0	1st
2016–17	Group stage	(Azerbaijan) Qarabağ	5–1	2–1	1st
2016–17	Group stage	(Czech Republic) Slovan Liberec	3–0	3–1	1st
2016–17	Round of 32	(Germany) Borussia Mönchengladbach	2–4	1–0	3–4

=== UEFA Conference League ===
Season	Round	Opposition	Home	Away	Aggregate
2022–23	Play-off round	(Netherlands) Twente	2–1	0–0	2–1
2022–23	Group stage	(Latvia) RFS	1–1	3–0	2nd
2022–23	Group stage	(Turkey) İstanbul Başakşehir	2–1	0–3	2nd
2022–23	Group stage	(Scotland) Heart of Midlothian	5–1	3–0	2nd
2022–23	Knockout round play-offs	(Portugal) Braga	3–2	4–0	7–2
2022–23	Round of 16	(Turkey) Sivasspor	1–0	4–1	5–1
2022–23	Quarter-finals	(Poland) Lech Poznań	2–3	4–1	6–4
2022–23	Semi-finals	(Switzerland) Basel	1–2	3–1 (a.e.t.)	4–3
2022–23	Final	(England) West Ham United	1–2		
2023–24	Play-off round	(Austria) Rapid Wien	2–0	0–1	2–1
2023–24	Group stage	(Belgium) Genk	2–1	2–2	1st
2023–24	Group stage	(Hungary) Ferencváros	2–2	1–1	1st
2023–24	Group stage	(Serbia) Čukarički	6–0	1–0	1st
2023–24	Round of 16	(Israel) Maccabi Haifa	1–1	4–3	5–4
2023–24	Quarter-finals	(Czech Republic) Viktoria Plzeň	2–0 (a.e.t.)	0–0	2–0
2023–24	Semi-finals	(Belgium) Club Brugge	3–2	1–1	4–3
2023–24	Final	(Greece) Olympiacos	0–1 (a.e.t.)		
2024–25	Play-off round	(Hungary) Puskás Akadémia	3–3	1–1 (a.e.t.)	4–4 (5–4 p)
2024–25	League phase	(Wales) The New Saints	2–0	—N/a	3rd
2024–25	League phase	(Switzerland) St. Gallen	—N/a	4–2	3rd
2024–25	League phase	(Cyprus) APOEL	—N/a	1–2	3rd
2024–25	League phase	(Cyprus) Pafos	3–2	—N/a	3rd
2024–25	League phase	(Austria) LASK	7–0	—N/a	3rd
2024–25	League phase	(Portugal) Vitória de Guimarães	—N/a	1–1	3rd
2024–25	Round of 16	(Greece) Panathinaikos	3–1	2–3	5–4
2024–25	Quarter-finals	(Slovenia) Celje	2–2	2–1	4–3
2024–25	Semi-finals	(Spain) Real Betis	2–2 (a.e.t.)	1–2	3–4
2025–26	Play-off round	(Ukraine) Polissya Zhytomyr	3–2	3–0	6–2
2025–26	League phase	(Czech Republic) Sigma Olomouc	2–0	—N/a	15th
2025–26	League phase	(Austria) Rapid Wien	—N/a	3–0	15th
2025–26	League phase	(Germany) Mainz 05	—N/a	1–2	15th
2025–26	League phase	(Greece) AEK Athens	0–1	—N/a	15th
2025–26	League phase	(Ukraine) Dynamo Kyiv	2–1	—N/a	15th
2025–26	League phase	(Switzerland) Lausanne-Sport	—N/a	0–1	15th
2025–26	Knockout phase play-offs	(Poland) Jagiellonia Białystok	2–4 (a.e.t.)	3–0	5–4
2025–26	Round of 16	(Poland) Raków Częstochowa	2–1	2–1	4–2
2025–26	Quarter-finals	(England) Crystal Palace	2–1	0–3	2–4

== FIFA-only recognized seasonal competitions ==
=== Inter-Cities Fairs Cup ===
Season	Round	Opposition	Home	Away	Aggregate
1964–65	First round	(Spain) Barcelona	0–2	1–0	1–2
1965–66	First round	(Socialist Federal Republic of Yugoslavia) Red Star Belgrade	3–1	4–0	7–1
1965–66	Second round	(Czechoslovakia) Spartak Brno	2–0	0–4	2–4
1967–68	First round	(France) Nice	4–0	1–0	5–0
1967–68	Second round	(Portugal) Sporting CP	1–1	1–2	2–3
1968–69	First round	(Socialist Federal Republic of Yugoslavia) Dinamo Zagreb	2–1	1–1	3–2
1968–69	Second round	(East Germany) Hansa Rostock	2–1	2–3	4–4 (a)
1968–69	Third round	(Portugal) Vitória de Setubal	2–1	0–3	2–4
1970–71	First round	(Poland) Ruch Chorzów	2–0	1–1	3–1
1970–71	Second round	(West Germany) 1. FC Köln	1–2	0–1	1–3

== Overall record ==
=== By competition ===
As of 16 April 2026.

Competition	Pld	W	D	L	GF	GA	GD	Win%
European Cup / UEFA Champions League	45	21	15	9	63	49	+14	46.67
European Cup Winners' Cup / UEFA Cup Winners' Cup	28	17	4	7	52	27	+25	60.71
UEFA Cup / UEFA Europa League	98	43	30	25	129	95	+34	43.88
UEFA Conference League	60	33	13	14	125	73	+52	55.00
Total	231	114	62	55	369	244	+125	49.35

=== By club ===
The following list details Fiorentina's all-time record against clubs they have met one or more times in European competition. The club and its country are given, as well as the number of matches played (Pld), won by Fiorentina (W), drawn (D) and lost by Fiorentina (L), goals for Fiorentina (GF), goals against Fiorentina (GA), Fiorentina 's goal difference (GD), and their win percentages (W%). Statistics are correct as of the 2025–26 season and include goals scored during extra time where applicable; in these matches, the result given is the result at the end of extra time.

As of match played 16 April 2026
Key

Positive balance (more wins than losses)
Neutral balance (as many wins as losses)
Negative balance (more losses than wins)

Club	Pld	W	D	L	GF	GA	GD	W%
(Greece) AEK Athens	2	0	1	1	1	2	−1	0.00
(Sweden) AIK	2	1	1	0	3	0	+3	50.00
(Netherlands) Ajax	2	0	1	1	1	2	−1	0.00
(Belgium) Anderlecht	2	0	1	1	3	7	−4	0.00
(Cyprus) APOEL	1	0	0	1	1	2	−1	0.00
(Spain) Atlético Madrid	4	1	1	2	2	5	−3	25.00
(France) Auxerre	2	2	0	0	2	0	+2	100.00
(Spain) Barcelona	6	1	2	3	7	11	−4	16.67
(Switzerland) Basel	4	1	1	2	7	7	+0	25.00
(Germany) Bayern Munich	4	1	1	2	5	8	−3	25.00
(Portugal) Belenenses	2	2	0	0	5	0	+5	100.00
(Portugal) Benfica	2	1	0	1	2	1	+1	50.00
(Turkey) Beşiktaş	2	2	0	0	6	0	+6	100.00
(Portugal) Boavista	2	1	0	1	1	1	+0	50.00
(France) Bordeaux	2	0	2	0	3	3	+0	0.00
(Germany) Borussia Mönchengladbach	2	1	0	1	3	4	−1	50.00
(Portugal) Braga	2	2	0	0	7	2	+5	100.00
(Slovenia) Celje	2	1	1	0	4	3	+1	50.00
(Scotland) Celtic	2	1	0	1	1	3	−2	50.00
(Belgium) Club Brugge	2	1	1	0	4	3	+1	50.00
(England) Crystal Palace	2	1	0	1	2	4	−2	50.00
(Serbia) Čukarički	2	2	0	0	7	0	+7	100.00
(Hungary) Debrecen	2	2	0	0	9	5	+4	100.00
(Belarus) Dinamo Minsk	2	1	0	1	4	2	+2	50.00
(Croatia) Dinamo Zagreb	4	2	1	1	7	4	+3	50.00
(Ukraine) Dnipro	4	3	1	0	6	3	+3	75.00
(Ukraine) Dynamo Kyiv	7	4	3	0	8	3	+5	57.14
(Czech Republic) Dynamo Žilina	2	1	0	1	4	3	+1	50.00
(Sweden) IF Elfsborg	1	1	0	0	6	1	+5	100.00
(Denmark) Esbjerg	2	1	1	0	4	2	+2	50.00
(Turkey) Eskişehirspor	2	2	0	0	5	1	+4	100.00
(England) Everton	2	1	0	1	2	2	+0	50.00
(Romania) FCSB	2	1	1	0	1	0	+1	50.00
(Turkey) Fenerbahçe	2	2	0	0	3	0	+3	100.00
(Hungary) Ferencváros	2	0	2	0	3	3	+0	0.00
(Belgium) Genk	2	1	1	0	4	3	+1	50.00
(Romania) Gloria Bistriţa	2	1	1	0	2	1	+1	50.00
(Switzerland) Grasshopper	6	3	1	2	9	8	+1	50.00
(Netherlands) Groningen	2	0	2	0	2	2	+0	0.00
(France) Guingamp	2	2	0	0	5	1	+4	100.00
(Hungary) Győri	2	1	0	1	3	4	−1	50.00
(Croatia) Hajduk Split	2	1	1	0	3	2	+1	50.00
(Germany) Hansa Rostock	2	0	2	0	4	4	+0	0.00
(Scotland) Heart of Midlothian	2	2	0	0	8	1	+7	100.00
(Turkey) İstanbul Başakşehir	2	1	0	1	2	4	−2	50.00
(Poland) Jagiellonia Białystok	2	1	0	1	5	4	+1	50.00
(Italy) Juventus	4	0	2	2	2	5	−3	0.00
(Germany) 1. FC Köln	2	0	0	2	1	3	−2	0.00
(Austria) LASK	1	1	0	0	7	0	+7	100.00
(Switzerland) Lausanne-Sport	1	0	0	1	0	1	−1	0.00
(Poland) Lech Poznań	4	2	0	2	9	6	+3	50.00
(France) Lille	2	0	0	2	0	3	−3	0.00
(England) Liverpool	2	2	0	0	4	1	+3	100.00
(Switzerland) Luzern	2	2	0	0	9	2	+7	100.00
(France) Lyon	4	1	1	2	4	5	−1	25.00
(Israel) Maccabi Haifa	2	1	1	0	5	4	+1	50.00
(Germany) Mainz 05	1	0	0	1	1	2	−1	0.00
(England) Manchester United	2	1	0	1	3	3	+0	50.00
(Czech Republic) Mladá Boleslav	1	1	0	0	2	1	+1	100.00
(France) Nice	2	2	0	0	5	0	+5	100.00
(Sweden) IFK Norrköping	2	1	1	0	2	1	+1	50.00
(Greece) Olympiacos	1	0	0	1	0	1	−1	0.00
(Sweden) Östers	2	2	0	0	3	1	+2	100.00
(Portugal) Paços de Ferreira	2	1	1	0	3	0	+3	50.00
(Greece) Panathinaikos	2	1	0	1	5	4	+1	50.00
(Romania) Pandurii	2	2	0	0	5	1	+4	100.00
(Greece) PAOK	4	1	2	1	4	4	+0	25.00
(Cyprus) Pafos	1	1	0	0	3	2	+1	100.00
(Ukraine) Polissya Zhytomyr	2	2	0	0	6	2	+4	100.00
(Netherlands) PSV Eindhoven	2	1	1	0	3	1	+2	50.00
(Hungary) Puskás Akadémia	2	0	2	0	4	4	+0	0.00
(Azerbaijan) Qarabağ	2	2	0	0	7	2	+5	100.00
(Poland) Raków Częstochowa	2	2	0	0	4	2	+2	100.00
(Scotland) Rangers	4	2	2	0	4	1	+3	50.00
(Austria) Rapid Wien	5	4	0	1	14	4	+10	80.00
(Spain) Real Betis	2	0	1	1	3	4	−1	0.00
(Spain) Real Madrid	1	0	0	1	0	2	−2	0.00
(Serbia) Red Star Belgrade	4	3	1	0	8	1	+7	75.00
(Latvia) RFS	2	1	1	0	4	1	+3	50.00
(Italy) Roma	2	1	1	0	4	1	+3	50.00
(Norway) Rosenborg	2	2	0	0	3	1	+2	100.00
(Poland) Ruch Chorzów	2	1	1	0	3	1	+2	50.00
(Germany) Schalke 04	2	0	0	2	1	5	−4	0.00
(Spain) Sevilla	2	0	0	2	0	5	−5	0.00
(Czech Republic) Sigma Olomouc	1	1	0	0	2	0	+2	100.00
(Turkey) Sivasspor	2	2	0	0	5	1	+4	100.00
(Czech Republic) Slavia Prague	2	1	1	0	2	0	+2	50.00
(Czech Republic) Slovan Liberec	2	1	1	0	6	1	+5	50.00
(France) Sochaux	2	0	2	0	1	1	+0	0.00
(Czech Republic) Sparta Prague	2	1	0	1	2	4	−2	50.00
(Czech Republic) Spartak Brno	2	1	0	1	2	4	−2	50.00
(Portugal) Sporting CP	4	0	3	1	5	6	−1	0.00
(Switzerland) St. Gallen	1	1	0	0	4	2	+2	100.00
(Wales) The New Saints	1	1	0	0	2	0	+2	100.00
(Austria) Tirol Innsbruck	4	1	2	1	7	7	+0	25.00
(England) Tottenham Hotspur	4	1	2	1	4	5	−1	25.00
(Netherlands) Twente	2	1	1	0	2	1	+1	50.00
(Hungary) Újpest	2	2	0	0	3	0	+3	100.00
(Romania) Universitatea Craiova	4	1	1	2	2	4	−2	25.00
(Spain) Valencia	2	1	0	1	1	2	−1	50.00
(Czech Republic) Viktoria Plzeň	2	1	1	0	2	0	+2	50.00
(Spain) Villarreal	1	0	1	0	1	1	+0	0.00
(Portugal) Vitória de Guimarães	1	0	1	0	1	1	+0	0.00
(Portugal) Vitória de Setúbal	4	2	0	2	4	6	−2	50.00
(Germany) Werder Bremen	2	0	2	0	1	1	+0	0.00
(England) West Ham United	1	0	0	1	1	2	−1	0.00
(Poland) Widzew Łódź	2	2	0	0	5	1	+4	100.00
(Germany) Zwickau	2	1	0	1	1	1	+0	50.00

=== European finals ===
Year	Competition	Opposition	Score	Venue
1957	European Cup	(Spain) Real Madrid	0–2	(Spain) Santiago Bernabéu, Madrid
1961	European Cup Winners' Cup	(Scotland) Rangers	2–0 (1st leg)	(Scotland) Ibrox Park, Glasgow
1961	European Cup Winners' Cup	(Scotland) Rangers	2–1 (2nd leg)	(Italy) Stadio Communale, Florence
1962	European Cup Winners' Cup	(Spain) Atlético Madrid	1–1	(Scotland) Hampden Park, Glasgow
1962	European Cup Winners' Cup	(Spain) Atlético Madrid	0–3 (replay)	(West Germany) Neckarstadion, Stuttgart
1990	UEFA Cup	(Italy) Juventus	1–3 (1st leg)	(Italy) Stadio Comunale Vittorio Pozzo, Turin
1990	UEFA Cup	(Italy) Juventus	0–0 (2nd leg)	(Italy) Stadio Partenio, Avellino
2023	UEFA Europa Conference League	(England) West Ham United	1–2	(Czech Republic) Fortuna Arena, Prague
2024	UEFA Europa Conference League	(Greece) Olympiacos	0–1 (a.e.t.)	(Greece) Agia Sophia Stadium, Athens
