= Szymiszów =

- Village
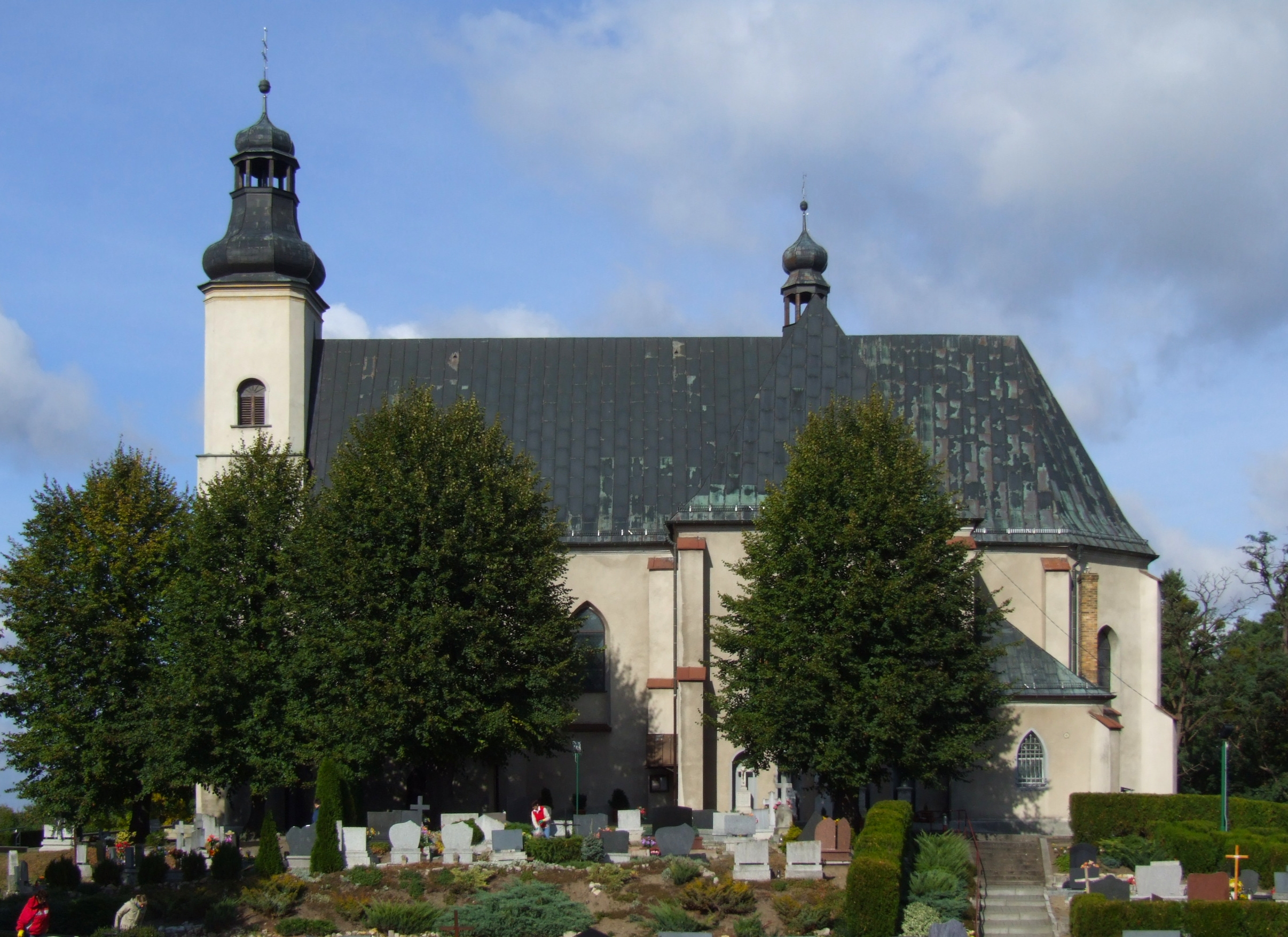
- Saints Simon and Jude church in Szymiszów

- Location within Poland
- Coordinates: 50°31′13″N 18°14′45″E
- Country: Poland
- Voivodeship: Opole
- County: Strzelce
- Gmina: Strzelce Opolskie
- Population: 1,300(Szymiszów-Osiedle) 720(Szymiszów-Wieś)
- Time zone: UTC+1 (CET)
  - Summer (DST): UTC+2 (CEST)
- Vehicle registration: OST

Szymiszów (Polish: [ʂɨˈmiʂuf], German: Schimischow) is a village in the administrative district of Gmina Strzelce Opolskie, within Strzelce County, Opole Voivodeship, in south-western Poland.

== History ==
In the 10th century the area became part of the emerging Polish state, and later on, it was part of Poland, Bohemia (Czechia), Prussia, and Germany. It was the site of fighting during the Polish Third Silesian Uprising against Germany in 1921. In 1936, during a massive Nazi campaign of renaming of placenames, the village was renamed to Heuerstein to erase traces of Polish origin. During World War II, the Germans operated the E130 forced labour subcamp of the Stalag VIII-B/344 prisoner-of-war camp at the local quarry. After the defeat of Germany in the war, in 1945, the village became again part of Poland and its historic name was restored.

== Transport ==
There is a train station in the village.

== Notable residents ==
- Kurt Tschenscher (1928 - 2014), German football referee
