= Dante Micheli =

Italian footballer (1939-2012)

Personal information
- Date of birth: 18 February 1939
- Place of birth: Mantua, Italy
- Date of death: 10 June 2012 (aged 73)
- Place of death: Mantua, Italy
- Height: 1.78 m (5 ft 10 in)
- Position: Forward

Senior career*
Years	Team	Apps	(Gls)
1955–1959	Mantova	104	(38)
1959–1960	SPAL	34	(1)
1960–1961	Fiorentina	14	(1)
1961–1964	SPAL	82	(10)
1964–1967	Foggia	89	(14)
1967–1973	Mantova	156	(4)
Total		479	(68)
- * Club domestic league appearances and goals

Dante Micheli (10 February 1939 – 10 June 2012) was an Italian footballer who played as a forward. He scored 68 goals from 479 league appearances, of which more than 250 were made in Serie A.

Micheli played for Mantova, SPAL, Fiorentina and Foggia. He was a member of the Fiorentina team that defeated Rangers 4–1 to win the 1960–61 European Cup Winners' Cup.
