= 2012 UEFA Europa League final =

2012 UEFA Europa League Final
- Match programme cover
- Event: 2011–12 UEFA Europa League
Atlético Madrid	Athletic Bilbao
(Spain)	(Spain)
3	0
- Date: 9 May 2012
- Venue: Arena Națională, Bucharest
- Man of the Match: Radamel Falcao (Atlético Madrid)
- Referee: Wolfgang Stark (Germany)
- Attendance: 52,347
- Weather: Cloudy night 11 °C (52 °F); 83% humidity

The 2012 UEFA Europa League Final was the final match of the 2011–12 UEFA Europa League, the 41st season of Europe's secondary club football tournament organised by UEFA (after the UEFA Champions League), and the 3rd season since it was renamed from the UEFA Cup to the UEFA Europa League. The match was played on 9 May 2012 at the Arena Națională in Bucharest, Romania, and was contested between two Spanish sides – Atlético Madrid and Athletic Bilbao. The match ended with Atlético Madrid winning 3–0, with Radamel Falcao scoring two goals and Diego scoring another. In doing so, Falcao was named man of the match, and became the first player to win back-to-back Europa League titles with different teams.

The winners earned the right to play against Chelsea, the winners of the 2011–12 UEFA Champions League, in the 2012 UEFA Super Cup.

== Venue ==
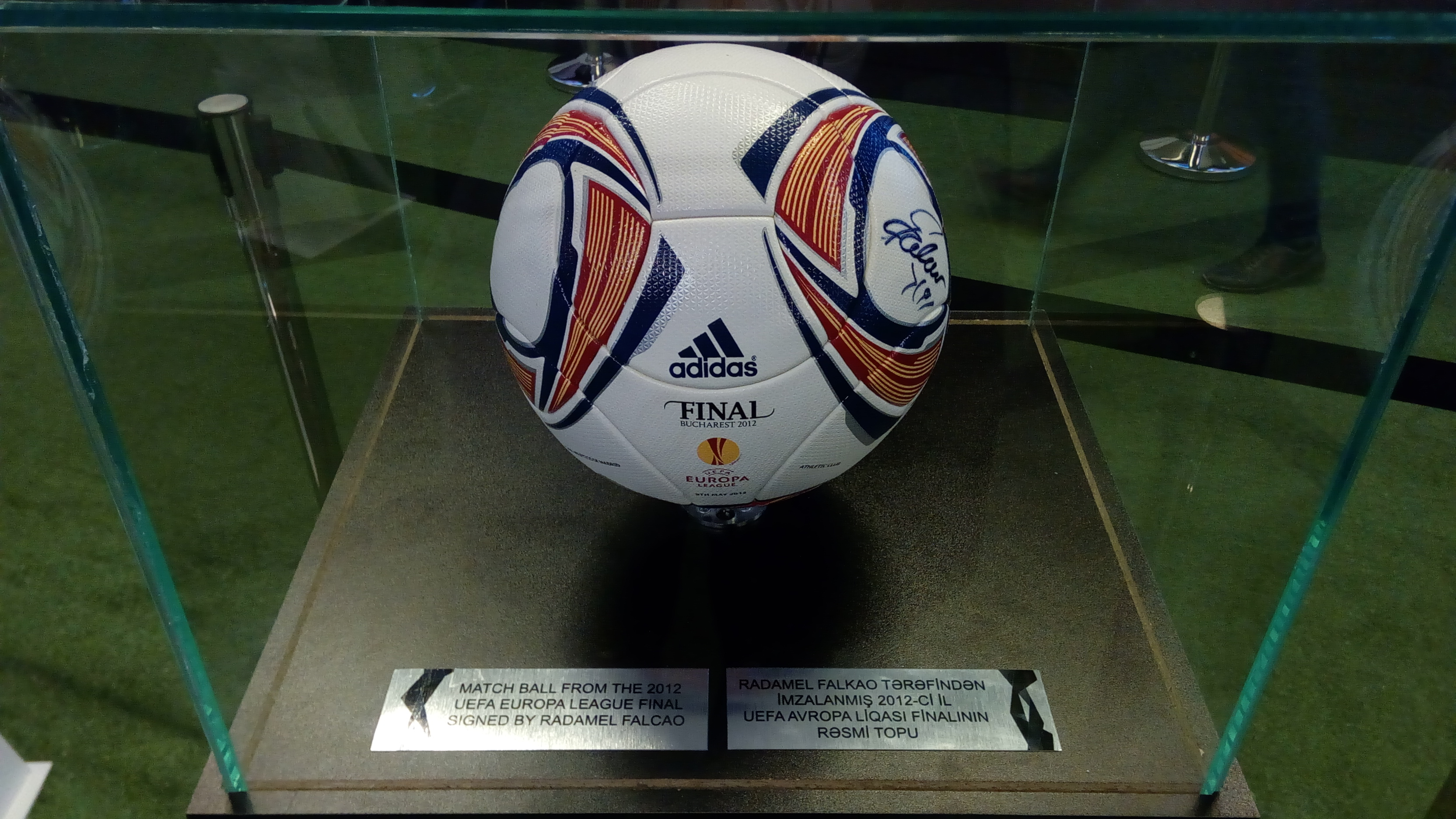
Match ball

The Arena Națională was announced by UEFA as the venue of the 2012 final on 30 January 2010. This was the first final of a European football club competition hosted by Romania.

The stadium was built on the site of the former national stadium, and opened on 6 September 2011 with a UEFA Euro 2012 Group D qualifier match between Romania and France.

== Background ==
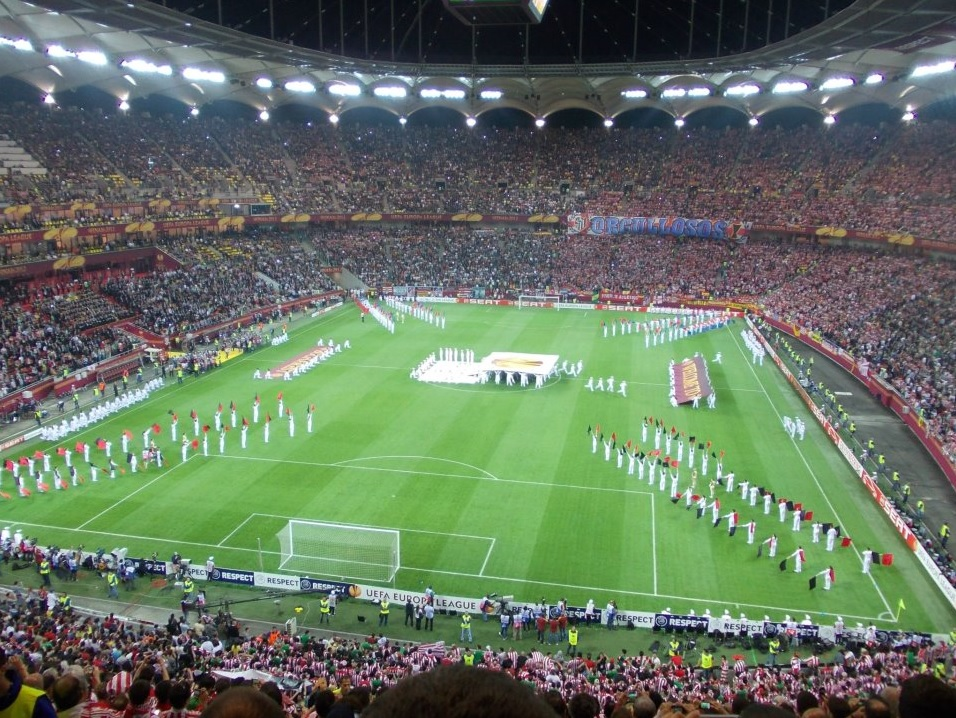
The final was preceded by an opening ceremony.

This was the second consecutive Europa League final contested by two teams from the same nation, and the ninth time overall (including UEFA Cup). The only other all-Spanish final of UEFA's second club competition was the 2007 UEFA Cup Final, when Sevilla defeated Espanyol. That was also the last final before the 2019 UEFA Europa League Final, where both finalist teams had played only in the UEFA Cup/Europa League in their routes to the final (rather than dropping down from the UEFA Champions League, either after the early knockout rounds or after the group stage).

Both teams have played in one previous Europa League/UEFA Cup final. Atlético Madrid won the first Europa League final after its renaming in 2010, beating Fulham 2–1 after extra time. Athletic Bilbao lost in 1977 to Juventus on away goals after the tie finished 2–2 on aggregate. The two teams have never met in European competition before. They have met each other in three Copa del Rey finals, with Athletic Bilbao winning two and Atlético Madrid winning one. In the 2011–12 La Liga season, Athletic Bilbao won their home fixture 3–0 and Atlético Madrid won their home fixture 2–1.

After losing to Udinese on 20 October 2011, Atlético Madrid went on a run of 11 straight victories to the final, a record in European football, winning their remaining group games to top their group and then defeating four knockout opponents both home and away.

== Route to the final ==
(Spain) Atlético Madrid				Round	(Spain) Athletic Bilbao			
Opponent	Agg.	1st leg	2nd leg	Qualifying phase	Opponent	Agg.	1st leg	2nd leg
(Norway) Strømsgodset	4–1	2–1 (H)	2–0 (A)	Third qualifying round	Bye			
(Portugal) Vitória de Guimarães	6–0	2–0 (H)	4–0 (A)	Play-off round	(Turkey) Trabzonspor	w/o (Note: As a result of match-fixing allegations, Turkish club Fenerbahçe were removed from the 2011–12 UEFA Champions League and were replaced with Trabzonspor on 24 August 2011. As a result, Trabzonspor's second leg against Athletic Bilbao was cancelled, and Athletic Bilbao advanced to the group stage.)	0–0	Canc.
Opponent	Result			Group stage	Opponent	Result		
(Scotland) Celtic	2–0 (H)			Matchday 1	(Slovakia) Slovan Bratislava	2–1 (A)		
(France) Rennes	1–1 (A)			Matchday 2	(France) Paris Saint-Germain	2–0 (H)		
(Italy) Udinese	0–2 (A)			Matchday 3	(Austria) Red Bull Salzburg	2–2 (H)		
(Italy) Udinese	4–0 (H)			Matchday 4	(Austria) Red Bull Salzburg	1–0 (A)		
(Scotland) Celtic	1–0 (A)			Matchday 5	(Slovakia) Slovan Bratislava	2–1 (H)		
(France) Rennes	3–1 (H)			Matchday 6	(France) Paris Saint-Germain	2–4 (A)		
Group I winners: Pos / Team / Pld / Pts; 1 / (Spain) Atlético Madrid / 6 / 13; 2 / (Italy) Udinese / 6 / 9; 3 / (Scotland) Celtic / 6 / 6; 4 / (France) Rennes / 6 / 3; Source: Soccerway				Final standings	Group F winners: Pos / Team / Pld / Pts; 1 / (Spain) Athletic Bilbao / 6 / 13; 2 / (Austria) Red Bull Salzburg / 6 / 10; 3 / (France) Paris Saint-Germain / 6 / 10; 4 / (Slovakia) Slovan Bratislava / 6 / 1; Source: Soccerway			
Opponent	Agg.	1st leg	2nd leg	Knockout phase	Opponent	Agg.	1st leg	2nd leg
(Italy) Lazio	4–1	3–1 (A)	1–0 (H)	Round of 32	(Russia) Lokomotiv Moscow	2–2 (a)	1–2 (A)	1–0 (H)
(Turkey) Beşiktaş	6–1	3–1 (H)	3–0 (A)	Round of 16	(England) Manchester United	5–3	3–2 (A)	2–1 (H)
(Germany) Hannover 96	4–2	2–1 (H)	2–1 (A)	Quarter-finals	(Germany) Schalke 04	6–4	4–2 (A)	2–2 (H)
(Spain) Valencia	5–2	4–2 (H)	1–0 (A)	Semi-finals	(Portugal) Sporting CP	4–3	1–2 (A)	3–1 (H)

== Pre-match ==
=== Ticketing ===
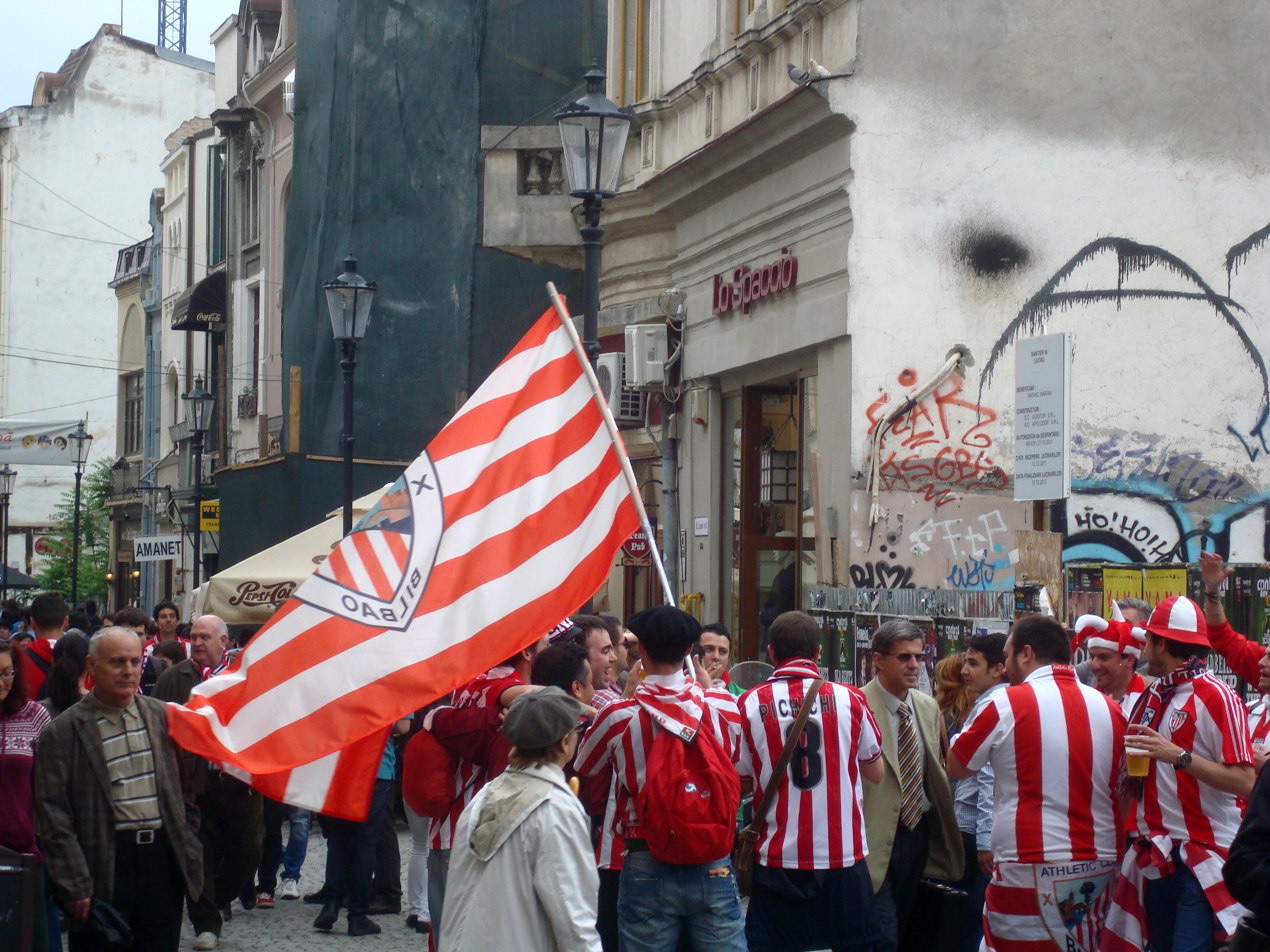
Athletic Bilbao fans in Bucharest before the match

The two finalist teams received 9,000 tickets each for distribution to their supporters. 20,000 tickets have been sold to local football fans with a further 3,000 tickets available for sale to fans worldwide via UEFA.com, with prices between 100 RON and 500 RON. The remaining tickets are allocated to the local organising committee, UEFA's 53 national football associations, and commercial and broadcast partners.

=== Officials ===
In May 2012, German referee Wolfgang Stark was appointed for the final. Joining him were fellow German officials Mike Pickel and Jan-Hendrik Salver as assistant referees, Deniz Aytekin and Florian Meyer as additional assistant referees, Mark Borsch as reserve assistant referee, and French official Stéphane Lannoy as fourth official.

=== Ambassador ===
Former Romanian player Miodrag Belodedici was named as the ambassador for the final.

== Match ==
=== Details ===
9 May 2012
21:45 UTC+3

Atlético Madrid (Spain)	3–0	(Spain) Athletic Bilbao
Falcao 7', 34'; Diego 85'	Report

Arena Națională, Bucharest
Attendance: 52,347
Referee: Wolfgang Stark (Germany)

Atlético Madrid	Athletic Bilbao

GK	13	(Belgium) Thibaut Courtois
RB	20	(Spain) Juanfran
CB	2	(Uruguay) Diego Godín
CB	23	(Brazil) Miranda
LB	6	(Brazil) Filipe Luís
CM	4	(Spain) Mario Suárez
CM	14	(Spain) Gabi (c)
RW	22	(Brazil) Diego		(substituted off) 90'
AM	7	(Spain) Adrián		(substituted off) 88'
LW	11	(Turkey) Arda Turan		(substituted off) 90+3'
CF	9	(Colombia) Radamel Falcao	(yellow card) 26'
Substitutes:
GK	25	(Spain) Sergio Asenjo
DF	3	(Spain) Antonio López
DF	18	(Spain) Álvaro Domínguez		(substituted on) 90+3'
MF	8	(Argentina) Eduardo Salvio		(substituted on) 88'
MF	12	(Brazil) Paulo Assunção
MF	19	(Spain) Koke		(substituted on) 90'
FW	41	(Spain) Pedro Martín
Manager:
(Argentina) Diego Simeone

GK	1	(Spain) Gorka Iraizoz
RB	15	(Spain) Andoni Iraola (c)
CB	24	(Spain) Javi Martínez
CB	5	(Venezuela) Fernando Amorebieta	(yellow card) 64'
LB	3	(Spain) Jon Aurtenetxe		(substituted off) 46'
RM	21	(Spain) Ander Herrera	(yellow card) 22'	(substituted off) 63'
CM	8	(Spain) Ander Iturraspe		(substituted off) 46'
LM	10	(Spain) Óscar de Marcos
RW	14	(Spain) Markel Susaeta	(yellow card) 90+1'
LW	19	(Spain) Iker Muniain
CF	9	(Spain) Fernando Llorente
Substitutes:
GK	13	(Spain) Raúl
DF	6	(Spain) Mikel San José
MF	11	(Spain) Igor Gabilondo
MF	17	(Spain) Iñigo Pérez	(yellow card) 75'	(substituted on) 46'
MF	23	(Spain) Borja Ekiza
FW	2	(Spain) Gaizka Toquero		(substituted on) 63'
FW	28	(Spain) Ibai Gómez		(substituted on) 46'
Manager:
(Argentina) Marcelo Bielsa

Man of the Match:
Radamel Falcao (Atlético Madrid)

Assistant referees:
Jan-Hendrik Salver (Germany)
Mike Pickel (Germany)
Fourth official:
Stéphane Lannoy (France)
Additional assistant referees:
Florian Meyer (Germany)
Deniz Aytekin (Germany)
Reserve assistant referee:
Mark Borsch (Germany)

Match rules

- 90 minutes
- 30 minutes of extra time if necessary
- Penalty shoot-out if scores still level
- Seven named substitutes
- Maximum of three substitutions

=== Statistics ===
First half
Statistic	Atlético Madrid	Athletic Bilbao
Goals scored	2	0
Total shots	6	5
Shots on target	2	1
Saves	1	0
Ball possession	40%	60%
Corner kicks	3	2
Fouls committed	17	8
Offsides	0	2
Yellow cards	1	1
Red cards	0	0

Second half
Statistic	Atlético Madrid	Athletic Bilbao
Goals scored	1	0
Total shots	9	11
Shots on target	4	2
Saves	2	3
Ball possession	42%	58%
Corner kicks	0	6
Fouls committed	8	6
Offsides	2	1
Yellow cards	0	3
Red cards	0	0

Overall
Statistic	Atlético Madrid	Athletic Bilbao
Goals scored	3	0
Total shots	15	16
Shots on target	6	3
Saves	3	3
Ball possession	41%	59%
Corner kicks	3	8
Fouls committed	25	14
Offsides	2	3
Yellow cards	1	4
Red cards	0	0

== See also ==
- 2012 UEFA Champions League final
- 2012 UEFA Super Cup
- Athletic Bilbao in European football
- Atlético Madrid in European football
- Spanish football clubs in international competitions
- 2011–12 Athletic Bilbao season
- 2011–12 Atlético Madrid season
- Played between same teams:
- 1921 Copa del Rey Final
- 1956 Copa del Generalísimo Final
- 1985 Copa del Rey Final
