= 1960–61 Coppa Italia =

Tournament details
- Country: Italy
- Dates: 4 Sept 1960 – 11 June 1961
- Teams: 34

Final positions
- Champions: Fiorentina (2nd title)
- Runners-up: Lazio

Tournament statistics
- Matches played: 38
- Goals scored: 135 (3.55 per match)
- Top goal scorer(s): Gianfranco Petris (5 goals)

The 1960–61 Coppa Italia was the 14th Coppa Italia, the major Italian domestic cup. The competition was won by Fiorentina, who defeated Lazio 2–0 in the final.

== First round ==
Serie B teams.

Date	Home team	Score	Away team	Attendance	Referee
4 September 1960	Triestina	1–0	Venezia	2,116	Francescon
4 September 1960	Hellas Verona	1–2	Marzotto	1,996	Samani
4 September 1960	Alessandria	5–0	Novara	1,536	Sbardella
4 September 1960	Como	0–0 (a.e.t.) (5–2 p)	Pro Patria	1,761	Gazzano
4 September 1960	Brescia	3–1 (a.e.t.)	Mantova	5,156	Babini
4 September 1960	Parma	2–1	Monza	2,162	Angonese
4 September 1960	Sambenedettese	2–1	Reggiana	1,040	Cotugno
4 September 1960	Genoa	1–2	Prato	3,241	Politano
4 September 1960	Catanzaro	0–1 (a.e.t.)	Foggia	2,301	Cirone
4 September 1960	Messina	2–0	Palermo	5,882	Cataldo

== Second round ==
14 clubs from Serie A are added.

Date	Home team	Score	Away team	Attendance	Referee
18 September 1960	Udinese	0–1	Triestina	1,315	Butti
18 September 1960	Padova	3–0	Marzotto	1,321	Sbardella
18 September 1960	Alessandria	3–5	Milan	4,680	Leita
18 September 1960	Como	3–2	Atalanta	1,357	Roversi
18 September 1960	Brescia	5–4 (a.e.t.)	Vicenza	5,821	Gambarotta
18 September 1960	Parma	1–3	Internazionale	12,293	De Marchi
18 September 1960	SPAL	1–2	Sambenedettese	2,071	D'Agostini
18 September 1960	Sampdoria	3–3 (a.e.t.) (4–3 p)	Prato	4,773	Angonese
18 September 1960	Bari	3–1	Foggia	10,903	Parisi
18 September 1960	Catania	1–2	Messina	9,043	Di Tonno
18 September 1960	Bologna	4–2 (a.e.t.)	Lecco	3,637	Annoscia
18 September 1960	Napoli	1–2 (a.e.t.)	Roma	34,750	Angelini

== Round of 16 ==
Juventus, Fiorentina, Torino, Lazio are added.

Date	Home team	Score	Away team	Attendance	Referee
25 January 1961	Sambenedettese	1–4	Juventus	7,510	Jonni
15 February 1961	Messina	0–2	Fiorentina	8,281	Rebuffo
1 March 1961	Torino	2–1	Milan	7,923	Reversi
8 March 1961	Bari	1–2 (a.e.t.)	Sampdoria	3,934	Leita
8 March 1961	Roma	3–0	Bologna	15,638	Francescon
15 March 1961	Internazionale	7–1	Brescia	4,628	D'Agostini
15 March 1961	Lazio	4–0	Como	3,647	Marchese
15 March 1961	Padova	1–0	Triestina	1,328	Ferrari

== Quarter-finals ==
Date	Home team	Score	Away team	Home goalscorers	Away goalscorers	Attendance	Referee
5 April 1961	Internazionale	0–1	Lazio		Morrone	11,939	Angonese
23 April 1961	Padova	0–1	Torino		Cella	2,230	De Marchi
3 May 1961	Sampdoria	0–2	Juventus		Nicolè (2)	11,782	Rigato
3 May 1961	Roma	4–6	Fiorentina	Pestrin, Selmosson, Menichelli, Orlando	Da Costa (2), Petris (2), Milan (2)	23,071	Bonetto

== Semi-finals ==
Date	Home team	Score	Away team	Home goalscorers	Away goalscorers	Attendance	Referee
10 May 1961	Fiorentina	3–1	Juventus	Milan, Marchesi, Da Costa	Mora	26,617	Jonni
3 May 1961	Lazio	1–1 (a.e.t.) (5–4 p)	Torino	Carradori Carradori (5)	Janich (o.g.) Mazzero (4)	9,804	Marchese

== Third place match ==
29 June 1961	Juventus	2–2 (a.e.t.) (3–2 p)	Torino	Turin
	Cervato; Cavallito		Locatelli; Mazzero	Stadium: Stadio Comunale; Attendance: 8,924; Referee: De Marchi
	Penalties
	Mora (3) (penalty scored)		(penalty scored) Mazzero (2)

== Final ==
11 June 1961
17:30

Fiorentina	2–0	Lazio
Petris 4'; Milan 80'

Stadio Communale, Florence
Referee: Gino Rigato

== Top goalscorers ==
Rank	Player	Club	Goals
1	(Italy) Gianfranco Petris	Fiorentina	5
2	(Italy) Luigi Milan	Fiorentina	4
2	(Brazil) (Italy) José Altafini	Milan	4
