= Idilio Cei =

Italian footballer

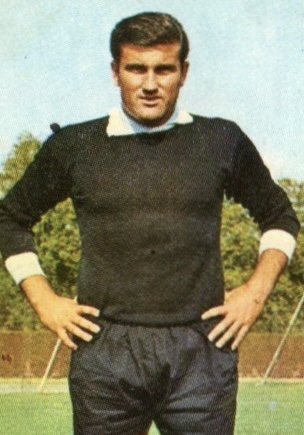

Personal information
- Date of birth: August 8, 1937
- Place of birth: Monsummano Terme, Italy
- Date of death: March 24, 1996 (aged 58)
- Place of death: Larciano, Italy
- Position: Goalkeeper

Senior career*
Years	Team	Apps	(Gls)
1956–1958	Foligno	?	(?)
1958–1968	Lazio	268	(0)
1968–1970	Palermo	?17	(0)
1970–1972	Siena	46	(0)
?–?	Larcianese	?	(?)

Managerial career
- ?–?: Larcianese
- 1979–1980: Siena
- 1980–1981: Sangiovannese
- 1981–1982: Livorno
- 1984–1985: Massese
- * Club domestic league appearances and goals

Idilio Cei (born August 8, 1937, Monsummano Terme – d. March 24, 1996) was an Italian football goalkeeper.
