= Sergio Castelletti =

Italian footballer and manager

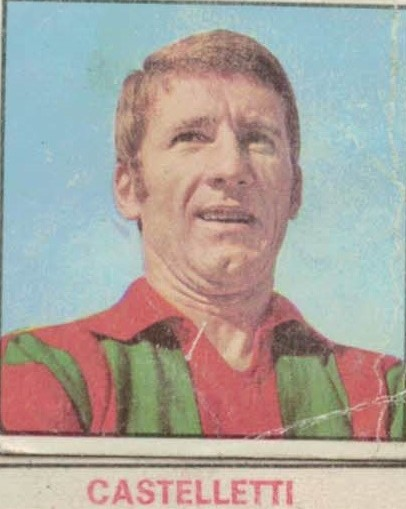

Personal information
- Full name: Sergio Castelletti
- Date of birth: 30 December 1937
- Place of birth: Casale Monferrato, Italy
- Date of death: 28 November 2004 (aged 66)
- Place of death: Florence, Italy
- Position: Defender

Youth career
- 1955: Casale

Senior career*
Years	Team	Apps	(Gls)
1956–1958	Torino	1	(0)
1958–1959	Vigevano	34	(0)
1959–1966	Fiorentina	214	(0)
1966–1968	Lazio	26	(0)
1968–1969	Massese	37	(0)
1969–1971	Ternana	64	(0)

International career
1960	Italy young	1	(0)
1959	Italy B team	2	(0)
1958–1962	Italy	7	(0)

Managerial career
- 1971–1972: Empoli
- 1972–1974: Lucchese
- 1974–1975: Alessandria
- 1975–1976: Viareggio
- 1977–1979: Massese
- 1991–1992: Entella
- * Club domestic league appearances and goals as of 1 March 2010

Sergio Castelletti (Italian pronunciation: [ˈsɛrdʒo kastelˈletti]; 30 December 1937 – 28 November 2004) was an Italian professional footballer and manager, who played as a defender.

== Career ==
=== Player ===
As a footballer, he played several seasons with Fiorentina, winning twice Coppa Italia (1961, 1966), a UEFA Cup Winners' Cup (1961) and a Mitropa Cup (1966).

Along with his team-mate Enzo Robotti, who also came from the province of Alessandria like Castelletti himself, he formed a strong full-back pairing, which sometimes even lined up with the Italy national football team.

=== Manager ===
After the end of his playing career, Castelletti trained Fiorentina youth team, some clubs in Serie B and in lower divisions.

== Death ==
He died in 2004.
