= Gianfranco Petris =

Italian footballer

Personal information
- Full name: Gianfranco Petris
- Date of birth: 30 August 1936
- Place of birth: Budoia, Kingdom of Italy
- Date of death: 1 July 2018 (aged 81)
- Place of death: Trepalle, Italy
- Height: 1.73 m (5 ft 8 in)
- Position: Forward

Senior career*
Years	Team	Apps	(Gls)
1954–1956	Treviso	40	(11)
1956–1958	Triestina	63	(23)
1958–1964	Fiorentina	166	(43)
1964–1965	Lazio	11	(1)
1965–1966	Polisportiva Trani	23	(2)

International career
1958–1963	Italy	4	(1)
- * Club domestic league appearances and goals

Gianfranco Petris (Italian pronunciation: [dʒaɱˈfraŋko ˈpɛːtris]; 30 August 1936 – 1 July 2018) was an Italian footballer who played as a forward.

== Club career ==
Petris played for several clubs, including Treviso, Triestina, Fiorentina, Lazio and Polisportiva Trani.

== International career ==
Petris made his debut for Italy in 1958. He earned 4 caps between 1958 and 1963, scoring 1 goal.

== Honours ==
Fiorentina

- Coppa Italia: 1960–61
