= Enzo Robotti =

Italian footballer (born 1935)

Personal information
- Date of birth: 13 June 1935 (age 91)
- Place of birth: Alessandria, Italy
- Height: 1.77 m (5 ft 9 1/2 in)
- Position: Defender

Senior career*
Years	Team	Apps	(Gls)
1955–1956	Sanremese	31	(0)
1956–1957	Juventus	15	(1)
1957–1965	Fiorentina	231	(2)
1965–1967	Brescia	49	(1)
1967–1968	Roma	21	(0)
Total		347	(4)

International career
1958–1965	Italy	15	(0)
- * Club domestic league appearances and goals

Enzo Robotti (Italian pronunciation: [ˈɛntso roˈbɔtti]; born 13 June 1935) is an Italian international former footballer who played as a defender.

== Club career ==
Robotti was born in Alessandria. During his club career, he played for ACF Fiorentina, A.S. Roma and Brescia Calcio.

== International career ==
At international level, Robotti earned 15 caps for the Italy national football team from 1958 to 1965, and participated in the 1962 FIFA World Cup.
