= 1968–69 AC Fiorentina season =

Fiorentina
1968–69 season
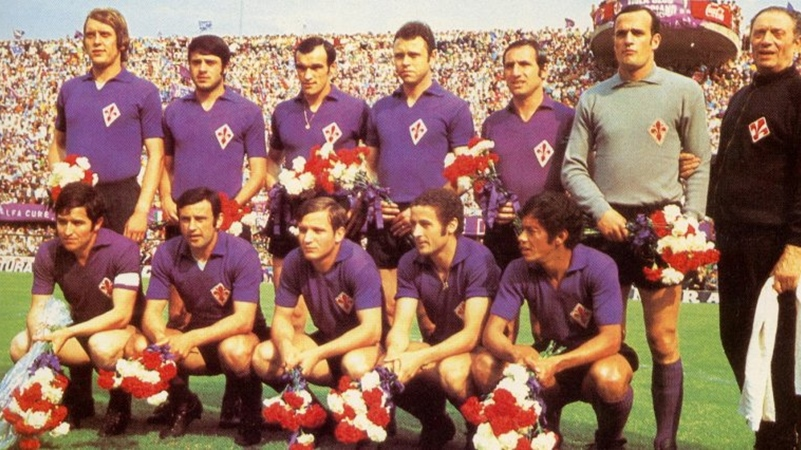
- President: Nello Baglini
- Manager: Bruno Pesaola
- Stadium: Comunale
- Serie A: 1st
- Coppa Italia: Group phase
- Inter-Cities Fairs Cup: Eightfinals
- Top goalscorer: League: Maraschi (14); All: Maraschi (16)
Home colours	Away colours

Fiorentina competed in Serie A, Coppa Italia and Inter-Cities Fairs Cup.

== Summary ==
Coached by Pesaola, Fiorentina won their second Scudetto in the 1968/69 season by prevailing over the favored Milan and Cagliari; led by Chiarugi's runs, Maraschi's goals (14) and De Sisti's class.

== Squad ==
Note: Flags indicate national team as defined under FIFA eligibility rules; some limited exceptions apply. Players may hold more than one non-FIFA nationality.

Pos.	Nation	Player
GK	ITA	Claudio Bandoni
GK	ITA	Franco Superchi
GK	ITA	Giuseppe Brizi
DF	ITA	Ugo Ferrante
DF	ITA	Eraldo Mancin
DF	ITA	Bernardo Rogora
DF	ITA	Paolino Stanzial
MF	ITA	Pierluigi Cencetti
MF	ITA	Giancarlo De Sisti (captain)
MF	ITA	Salvatore Esposito

Pos.	Nation	Player
MF	ITA	Claudio Merlo
MF	ITA	Giovan Battista Pirovano
FW	ITA	Lucio Bertogna
FW	ITA	Luciano Chiarugi
FW	ITA	Giancarlo Danova
FW	ITA	Mario Maraschi
FW	ITA	Giorgio Mariani
FW	ITA	Francesco Rizzo
FW	BRA	Amarildo

== Competitions ==
=== Serie A ===
==== League table ====
Pos	Team	Pld	W	D	L	GF	GA	GD	Pts	Qualification or relegation
1	Fiorentina (C)	30	16	13	1	38	18	+20	45	Qualification to European Cup
2	Cagliari	30	14	13	3	41	18	+23	41	Qualified to Inter-Cities Fairs Cup
3	Milan	30	14	13	3	31	12	+19	41	Qualification to European Cup (Note: Qualified as defending champions.)
4	Internazionale	30	14	8	8	55	26	+29	36	Qualified to Inter-Cities Fairs Cup
5	Juventus	30	12	11	7	32	24	+8	35	Qualified to Inter-Cities Fairs Cup

Source: Panini
(C) Champions

==== Results by round ====
Round	1	2	3	4	5	6	7	8	9	10	11	12	13	14	15	16	17	18	19	20	21	22	23	24	25	26	27	28	29	30
Ground	A	H	A	H	H	A	H	A	H	H	A	H	A	H	A	H	A	H	A	A	H	A	H	A	A	H	A	H	A	H
Result	W	W	D	D	L	D	W	W	W	W	D	W	W	W	D	D	W	D	D	D	W	D	W	D	W	D	D	W	W	W
Position	2	3	3	3	6	7	5	4	3	3	3	3	2	2	2	2	2	3	3	3	1	1	1	1	1	1	1	1	1	1

Source: Competitive matches
A = Away; H = Home; W = Win; D = Draw; L = Loss; = Leader, 1969-70 European Cup; = 1969–70 Inter-Cities Fairs Cup; = Relegation to 1969–70 Serie B

==== Matches ====
29 September 1968 1	Roma	1–2	Fiorentina	Rome
	Taccola 33'	Report	58' Amarildo; 85' Maraschi	Stadium: Stadio Olimpico; Referee: Angonese

6 October 1968 2	Fiorentina	2–1	Atalanta	Florence
	Signorelli 40' (o.g.); Maraschi 89' (pen.)	Report	25' Incerti	Stadium: Stadio Comunale; Referee: Bigi

13 October 1968 3	Cagliari	1–1	Fiorentina	Cagliari
	Riva 80'	Report	36' Maraschi	Stadium: Stadio Amsicora; Referee: D'Agostini

27 October 1968 4	Fiorentina	0–0	Milan	Florence
		Report		Stadium: Stadio Comunale; Referee: Sbardella

3 November 1968 5	Fiorentina	1–3	Bologna	Florence
	Maraschi 59'	Report	34' Mujesan; 40' Savoldi; 82' Turra	Stadium: Stadio Comunale; Referee: Genel

10 November 1968 6	Lanerossi	0–0	Fiorentina	Vicenza
		Report		Stadium: Stadio Romeo Menti; Referee: Lo Bello

17 November 1968 7	Fiorentina	1–0	Sampdoria	Florence
	Amarildo 70'	Report		Stadium: Stadio Comunale; Referee: Acernese

24 November 1968 8	Inter	1–2	Fiorentina	Milan
	Domenghini 57'	Report	33' Chiarugi; 54' Amarildo	Stadium: Stadio San Siro; Referee: Gonella

1 December 1968 9	Fiorentina	1–0	Hellas Verona	Florence
	Rizzo 68'	Report		Stadium: Stadio Comunale; Referee: Carminati

8 December 1968 10	Fiorentina	2–1	Napoli	Florence
	Amarildo 67'; Rizzo 71'	Report	19' Cane	Stadium: Stadio Comunale; Referee: Gonella

15 December 1968 11	Torino	0–0	Fiorentina	Turin
		Report		Stadium: Stadio Comunale; Referee: Francescon

22 December 1968 12	Fiorentina	1–0	Palermo	Florence
	Maraschi 47' (pen.)	Report		Stadium: Stadio Comunale; Referee: De Robbio

12 January 1969 13	Pisa	0–1	Fiorentina	Pisa
		Report	37' Amarildo	Stadium: Stadio Arena Garibaldi; Referee: Lo Bello

19 January 1969 14	Fiorentina	2–1	Juventus	Florence
	De Sisti 21'; Maraschi 73'	Report	60' Zigoni	Stadium: Stadio Comunale; Referee: Monti

26 January 1969 15	Varese	2–2	Fiorentina	Varese
	Cappellini 5'; Leonardi 60'	Report	10' Maraschi; 65' De Sisti	Stadium: Stadio Franco Ossola; Referee: Gonella

2 February 1969 16	Fiorentina	0–0	Roma	Florence
		Report		Stadium: Stadio Comunale; Referee: Francescon

9 February 1969 17	Atalanta	0–1	Fiorentina	Bergamo
		Report	73' Maraschi	Stadium: Stadio Comunale; Referee: Lo Bello

15 February 1969 18	Fiorentina	1–1	Cagliari	Florence
	Maraschi 3'	Report	87' Riva	Stadium: Stadio Comunale; Referee: Sbardella

23 February 1969 19	Milan	0–0	Fiorentina	Milan
		Report		Stadium: Stadio San Siro; Referee: Gonella

2 March 1969 20	Bologna	0–0	Fiorentina	Bologna
		Report		Stadium: Stadio Comunale; Referee: Bernardis

9 March 1969 21	Fiorentina	3–0	Vicenza	Florence
	Chiarugi 15', 78'; Maraschi 42'	Report		Stadium: Stadio Comunale; Referee: Pieroni

16 March 1969 22	Sampdoria	1–1	Fiorentina	Genoa
	Frustalupi 49'	Report	79' Ferrante	Stadium: Stadio Luigi Ferraris; Referee: De Marchi

23 March 1969 23	Fiorentina	1–0	Inter	Florence
	Chiarugi 15'	Report		Stadium: Stadio Comunale; Referee: Lo Bello

6 April 1969 24	Hellas Verona	2–2	Fiorentina	Verona
	Bui 16'; Maddè 47' (pen.)	Report	14' Chiarugi; 60' Rizzo	Stadium: Stadio Marcantonio Bentegodi; Referee: Gonella

13 April 1969 25	Napoli	1–3	Fiorentina	Naples
	Cané 69'	Report	37', 40' Rizzo; 54' Maraschi	Stadium: Stadio San Paolo; Referee: D'Agostini

20 April 1969 26	Fiorentina	0–0	Torino	Florence
		Report		Stadium: Stadio Comunale; Referee: Francescon

27 April 1969 27	Palermo	0–0	Fiorentina	Catania
		Report		Stadium: Stadio Cibali; Referee: De Marchi

4 May 1969 28	Fiorentina	3–1	Pisa	Florence
	Rizzo 4'; Maraschi 22', 51' (pen.)	Report	83' Joan	Stadium: Stadio Comunale; Referee: Sbardella

11 May 1969 29	Juventus	0–2	Fiorentina	Turin
		Report	48' Chiarugi; 69' Maraschi	Stadium: Stadio Comunale; Referee: Lo Bello

18 May 1969 30	Fiorentina	3–1	Varese	Florence
	Merlo 40'; Chiarugi 43'; Amarildo 82' (pen.)	Report	90' Golin	Stadium: Stadio Comunale; Referee: Pieroni

=== Coppa Italia ===
==== Group 4 ====
Pos	Team	Pld	W	D	L	GF	GA	GD	Pts
1	Foggia	3	2	1	0	6	1	+5	5
2	Fiorentina	3	2	1	0	7	3	+4	5
3	Bari	3	0	1	2	4	8	−4	1
4	Pisa	3	0	1	2	0	5	−5	1

8 September 1968 1	Fiorentina	0 – 0	Foggia	Florence
21:00 CEST				Stadium: Comunale; Referee: Toselli

15 September 1968 2	AS Bari	3 – 5	Fiorentina	Bari
21:00 CEST	Tonoli 75'; Galletti 84', 85'		23' Merlo; 40' Chiarugi; 43' Rogora; 62' (o.g.) Vasini; 70' Mariani	Stadium: Stadio della Vittoria; Referee: Lo Bello

22 September 1968 3	Pisa	0 – 2	Fiorentina	Lucca
16:00 CET			76' Rizzo; 90' Chiarugi	Stadium: Stadio Porta Elisa; Referee: Gussoni

=== Inter-Cities Fairs Cup ===
==== First round ====
18 September 1967 1	Dinamo Zagreb (Socialist Republic of Croatia)	1 – 1	(Italy) Fiorentina	Zagreb
	Zambata 18'		83' Pirovano	Stadium: Maksimir; Referee: (Austria) Zinemayer

2 October 1968 2	Fiorentina (Italy)	2 – 1	(Socialist Republic of Croatia) Dinamo Zagreb	Florence
	Amarildo 1'; Maraschi 37'		64' Novak	Stadium: Comunale; Referee: (Belgium) Schaut

==== Second round ====
13 November 1968 1	Hansa Rostock (East Germany)	3 – 2	(Italy) Fiorentina	Rostock
	Kostmann 69'; Barthels 80'; Hergessell 90'		70' Maraschi; 84' Rizzo	Stadium: Ostseestadion; Referee: (Netherlands) Van Ravens

27 November 1968 2	Fiorentina (Italy)	2 – 1	(East Germany) Hansa Rostock	Florence
	Rizzo 36'; Merlo 68'		26' Kostmann	Stadium: Comunale; Referee: (France) Lacoste

==== Eightfinals ====
18 December 1968 1	Vitória Setúbal (Portugal)	3 – 0	(Italy) Fiorentina	Setubal
	Josè Maria 13', 52'; Arcanjo 32'			Stadium: Estádio do Bonfim; Referee: (Scotland) Wharton

22 January 1969 2	Fiorentina (Italy)	2 – 1	(Portugal) Vitória Setúbal	Florence
	Amarildo 12'; Rogora 36'		93' (o.g.) Mancin	Stadium: Comunale; Referee: (Switzerland) Klematide

== Statistics ==
=== Players statistics ===
No.	Pos	Nat	Player	Total		Serie A		Coppa		Fairs Cup	
No.	Pos	Nat	Player	Apps	Goals	Apps	Goals	Apps	Goals	Apps	Goals
	GK	(Italy) ITA	Franco Superchi	38	-29	30	-17	3	-3	5	-9
	DF	(Italy) ITA	Giuseppe Brizi	32	0	25	0	3	0	4	0
	DF	(Italy) ITA	Ugo Ferrante	39	1	30	1	3	0	6	0
	DF	(Italy) ITA	Eraldo Mancin	35	2	29	2	2	0	4	0
	DF	(Italy) ITA	Bernardo Rogora	37	3	28	1	3	1	6	1
	MF	(Italy) ITA	Giancarlo De Sisti	39	2	30	2	3	0	6	0
	MF	(Italy) ITA	Salvatore Esposito	27	0	20+2	0	0	0	5	0
	MF	(Italy) ITA	Claudio Merlo	32	3	25+1	1	2	1	4	1
	FW	(Italy) ITA	Francesco Rizzo	33	9	21+3	6	3	1	6	2
	FW	(Brazil) BRA	Amarildo	30	8	25	6	1	0	4	2
	FW	(Italy) ITA	Mario Maraschi	39	16	30	14	3	0	6	2
	GK	(Italy) ITA	Claudio Bandoni	2	-2	0+1	-1	0	-0	1	-1
	FW	(Italy) ITA	Luciano Chiarugi	24	9	17+1	7	3	2	3	0
	DF	(Italy) ITA	Paolino Stanzial	10	0	7	0	0	0	3	0
	MF	(Italy) ITA	Giovan Pirovano	13	1	6+1	0	3	0	3	1
	MF	(Italy) ITA	Pierluigi Cencetti	6	0	2+4	0	0	0	0	0
	FW	(Italy) ITA	Lucio Bertogna	2	0	0	0	1	0	1	0
	FW	(Italy) ITA	Giancarlo Danova	4	0	1+1	0	0	0	2	0
	FW	(Italy) ITA	Giorgio Mariani	3	1	1	0	1	1	1	0

- Source: http://calcio-seriea.net/presenze/1968/655/
