= 1969–70 AC Fiorentina season =

Associazione Calcio Fiorentina
1969–70 season
- President: Nello Baglini
- Manager: Bruno Pesaola
- Stadium: Comunale
- Serie A: 5th (in 1970–71 Inter-Cities Fairs Cup)
- Coppa Italia: Quarter-finals
- European Cup: Quarter-finals
- Top goalscorer: League: Luciano Chiarugi (12); All: Luciano Chiarugi (19)
Home colours	Away colours

During the 1969–70 season Fiorentina competed in Serie A, Coppa Italia and European Cup.

== Summary ==
The club as incumbent Champion started the season winning 4 consecutive matches, however, it was Cagliari from Luigi Riva, that clinched the Serie A. Head coach Bruno Pesaola and the squad reached a decent 5th place, and qualified to the 1970-71 Inter-Cities Fairs Cup.

Meanwhile, in the European Cup, Fiorentina defeated Swedish club Öster IF in the first round, and Dynamo Kyiv in the second round, only to be eliminated in the quarter-finals by Scottish club Celtic; in the Coppa Italia they were eliminated by Varese also at the quarter-final stage. It was the last season for Amarildo at the club.

Forward Luciano Chiarugi scored 19 goals being the season club top scorer.

== Squad ==
Note: Flags indicate national team as defined under FIFA eligibility rules; some limited exceptions apply. Players may hold more than one non-FIFA nationality.

Pos.	Nation	Player
GK	ITA	Claudio Bandoni
GK	ITA	Franco Superchi
GK	ITA	Giuseppe Brizi
DF	ITA	Ugo Ferrante
DF	ITA	Bernardo Rogora
DF	ITA	Fabrizio Berni
DF	ITA	Francesco Carpenetti
DF	ITA	Giuseppe Longoni
DF	ITA	Vasco Marinelli
MF	ITA	Pierluigi Cencetti

Pos.	Nation	Player
MF	ITA	Giancarlo De Sisti
MF	ITA	Salvatore Esposito
MF	ITA	Claudio Merlo
MF	ITA	Giovan Battista Pirovano
MF	ITA	Giovanni Marongiu
FW	ITA	Luciano Chiarugi
FW	ITA	Mario Maraschi
FW	ITA	Giorgio Mariani
FW	ITA	Francesco Rizzo
FW	ITA	Fabio Ferrario
FW	BRA	Amarildo

=== Transfers ===
In
Pos.	Name	from	Type
DF	Fabrizio Berni		
DF	Francesco Carpenetti		
DF	Giuseppe Longoni		
DF	Vasco Marinelli		
MF	Giovanni Marongiu		
FW	Fabio Ferrario		

Out
Pos.	Name	To	Type
FW	Lucio Bertogna		
FW	Giancarlo Danova		
DF	Eraldo Mancin		
DF	Paolino Stanzial		

== Competitions ==
=== Serie A ===
==== League table ====
Pos	Team	Pld	W	D	L	GF	GA	GD	Pts	Qualification or relegation
3	Juventus	30	15	8	7	43	20	+23	38	Qualified to Inter-Cities Fairs Cup
4	Milan	30	13	10	7	38	24	+14	36	(Note: Milan not qualified to the ICFC consequently to Inter qualification.)
4	Fiorentina	30	15	6	9	40	33	+7	36	Qualified to Inter-Cities Fairs Cup
6	Napoli	30	10	11	9	24	21	+3	31	
7	Torino	30	11	8	11	20	31	−11	30	

Source: Panini

==== Results by round ====
Round	1	2	3	4	5	6	7	8	9	10	11	12	13	14	15	16	17	18	19	20	21	22	23	24	25	26	27	28	29	30
Ground	H	A	H	A	H	A	H	A	H	A	H	H	A	A	H	A	H	A	H	A	H	A	H	A	H	A	A	H	H	A
Result	W	W	W	W	L	L	D	D	W	L	W	D	L	W	W	W	L	W	W	D	W	L	L	D	W	L	W	W	L	D
Position	1	1	1	1	2	3	2	2	2	3	2	2	4	2	2	2	3	3	3	3	3	4	5	5	3	4	4	4	4	5

Source: http://calcio-seriea.net/allenatori_squadra/1969/662/
A = Away; H = Home; W = Win; D = Draw; L = Loss; = Leader, 1969-70 European Cup; = 1969–70 Inter-Cities Fairs Cup

According to UEFA two-cities-ban rule Milan not qualified to the 1970-71 Inter-Cities Fairs Cup consequently to Inter qualification to 1970-71 European Cup.

==== Matches ====
- Source:http://calcio-seriea.net/allenatori_squadra/1969/662/

14 September 1969 1	Fiorentina	1–0	Hellas Verona	Florence
	Chiarugi 10'			Stadium: Comunale; Referee: Branzoni

21 September 1969 2	SSC Napoli	0–1	Fiorentina	Naples
			47' Maraschi	Stadium: San Paolo; Referee: Carminati

28 September 1969 3	Fiorentina	1–0	Sampdoria	Florence
	Esposito 42'			Stadium: Comunale; Referee: Toselli

5 October 1969 4	Lanerossi Vicenza	1–2	Fiorentina	Vicenza
	Vitali 22'		32', 88' Chiarugi	Stadium: Romeo Menti; Referee: Sbardella

12 October 1969 5	Fiorentina	0–1	Cagliari	Florence
			21' (pen.) Riva	Stadium: Comunale; Referee: Lo Bello

19 October 1969 6	SS Lazio	5–1	Fiorentina	Rome
	Governato 17'; Cucchi 21'; Chinaglia 27', 82'; Morrone 66'		3' Chiarugi	Stadium: Olimpico; Referee: Torelli

26 October 1969 7	Fiorentina	0–0	Torino	Verona
				Stadium: Marcantonio Bentegodi; Referee: D'Agostini

9 November 1969 8	Bologna	2–2	Fiorentina	Bologna
	Mujesan 76'; Roversi 79'		31' Maraschi; 51' Chiarugi	Stadium: Comunale; Referee: Sbardella

16 November 1969 9	Fiorentina	3–0	AS Bari	Florence
	Chiarugi 40', 69'; Esposito 83'			Stadium: Comunale; Referee: Angonese

30 November 1969 10	Juventus	2–0	Fiorentina	Turin
	Salvadore 48'; Anastasi 65'			Stadium: Comunale; Referee: D'Agostini

7 December 1969 11	Fiorentina	2–0	Inter	Florence
	Rizzo 11'; Chiarugi 16'			Stadium: Comunale; Referee: Picasso

14 December 1969 12	Fiorentina	2–2	AS Roma	Florence
	Amarildo 28'; Chiarugi 59'		54' Cappelli; 82' Cappellini	Stadium: Comunale; Referee: Monti

21 December 1969 13	AC Milan	4–2	Fiorentina	Milan
	Sormani 4' (pen.), 41' (pen.); Superchi 70' (o.g.); Maldera 77'		45' (pen.)Maraschi; 55' Amarildo	Stadium: San Siro; Referee: Gonella

28 December 1969 14	Brescia	1–2	Fiorentina	Brescia
	D'Alessi 90'		9' Maraschi; 75' Amarildo	Stadium: Mario Rigamonti; Referee: Angonese

4 January 1970 15	Fiorentina	3–1	Palermo	Florence
	Maraschi 30' (pen.); Amarildo 34’'; De Sisti 77’'		90' S. Bercellino	Stadium: Comunale; Referee: Carminati

11 January 1970 16	Hellas Verona	0–1	Fiorentina	Verona
			76' Merlo	Stadium: Marcantonio Bentegodi; Referee: Bernardis

18 January 1970 17	Fiorentina	1–2	SSC Napoli	Florence
	Ferrante 61'		39' Bianchi; 50' (pen.)Improta	Stadium: Comunale; Referee: Sbardella

25 January 1970 18	Sampdoria	1–3	Fiorentina	Genoa
	Francesconi 7'		54' Merlo; 68' (o.g.)Battara; 90' Chiarugi	Stadium: Luigi Ferraris; Referee: Torelli

1 February 1970 19	Fiorentina	2–1	Lanerossi Vicenza	Florence
	Rogora 58'; De Sisti 74'		38' Vitali	Stadium: Comunale; Referee: Vacchini

8 February 1970 20	Cagliari	0–0	Fiorentina	Cagliari
				Stadium: Amsicora; Referee: Carminati

15 February 1970 21	Fiorentina	2–0	SS Lazio	Florence
	Amarildo 9'; Ferrante 19'			Stadium: Comunale; Referee: Mascali

1 March 1970 22	Torino	1–0	Fiorentina	Turin
	Mondonico 51'			Stadium: Comunale; Referee: Angonese

8 March 1970 23	Fiorentina	0–1	Bologna	Florence
			66' G. Savoldi	Stadium: Comunale; Referee: Acernese

15 March 1970 24	AS Bari	1–1	Fiorentina	Bari
	Diomedi 4'		6' Ferrante	Stadium: Stadio della Vittoria; Referee: Motta

22 March 1970 25	Fiorentina	2–0	Juventus	Florence
	Mariani 2'; Merlo 30'			Stadium: Comunale; Referee: Toselli

29 March 1970 26	Inter	3–0	Fiorentina	Milan
	Facchetti 33'; Boninsegna 82'; Jair 88'			Stadium: San Siro; Referee: Lo Bello

5 April 1970 27	AS Roma	0–1	Fiorentina	Rome
			76' (pen.)Rizzo	Stadium: Olimpico; Referee: Gussoni

12 April 1970 28	Fiorentina	4–2	Milan	Florence
	Mariani 5'; Chiarugi 58', 73'; Trapattoni 68' (o.g.)		10' Rognoni; 13' Prati	Stadium: Comunale; Referee: Gonella

19 April 1970 29	Fiorentina	0–1	Brescia	Florence
			75' Simoni	Stadium: Comunale; Referee: Gialluisi

26 April 1970 30	Palermo	1–1	Fiorentina	Palermo
	Pellizzaro 64'		60' (o.g.)Reja	Stadium: La Favorita; Referee: Panzino

=== Coppa Italia ===
==== Group phase ====
31 August 1969 1	Arezzo	0–2	Fiorentina	Arezzo
			18' Maraschi; 53'’ Chiarugi	Stadium: Comunale; Referee: Lo Bello

3 September 1969 2	Fiorentina	7–0	AS Bari	Florence
	Maraschi 8', 36', 51'; Amarildo 40'; Merlo 43'; De Sisti 77'; Chiarugi 86'			Stadium: Comunale; Referee: Panzino

7 September 1969 3	Livorno	0–0	Fiorentina	Livorno
				Stadium: Comunale; Referee: Lattanzi

==== Quarterfinals ====
31 December 1969 1	Fiorentina	0–0	Varese	Florence
				Stadium: Comunale; Referee: Serafino

25 February 1970 2	Varese	0–0	Fiorentina	Varese
				Stadium: Stadio Franco Ossola; Referee: Toselli

9 April 1970 replay	Varese	1–0	Fiorentina	Verona
	Gorin 24'			Stadium: Marcantonio Bentegodi; Referee: Pieroni

=== European Cup ===
==== First round ====
17 September 1969 1	Fiorentina (Italy)	1–0	(Sweden) Öster	Florence
	Maraschi 68'			Stadium: Comunale; Referee: (Turkey) Ertuğrul Dilek

1 October 1969 2	Öster (Sweden)	1–2	(Italy) Fiorentina	Växjö
	Fjordsteam 3'		43' Amarildo; 71' Esposito	Stadium: Värendsvallen; Referee: (Netherlands) van Gemert

==== Eightfinals ====
12 November 1969 1	Dynamo Kyiv (Soviet Union)	1–2	(Italy) Fiorentina	Kyiv
	Serebrjanikov 57'		36' Chiarugi; 69' Maraschi	Stadium: Central Stadion; Referee: (Sweden) Boström

26 November 1969 2	Fiorentina (Italy)	0–0	(Soviet Union) Dynamo Kyiv	Florence
				Stadium: Comunale; Referee: (Austria) Marschall

==== Quarterfinals ====
4 March 1970 1	Celtic Glasgow (Scotland)	3–0	(Italy) Fiorentina	Glasgow
	Auld 30'; Carpenetti 49' (o.g.); Wallace 89'			Stadium: Celtic Park; Referee: (Spain) Pintado

18 March 1970 2	Fiorentina (Italy)	1–0	(Scotland) Celtic Glasgow	Florence
	Chiarugi 37'			Stadium: Comunale; Referee: (Switzerland) Scheurer

== Statistics ==
=== Players statistics ===
No.	Pos	Nat	Player	Total		Serie A		Coppa Italia		European Cup	
No.	Pos	Nat	Player	Apps	Goals	Apps	Goals	Apps	Goals	Apps	Goals
	GK	(Italy) ITA	Franco Superchi	36	-34	25	-28	5	-1	6	-5
	DF	(Italy) ITA	Giuseppe Brizi	38	0	26	0	6	0	6	0
	DF	(Italy) ITA	Ugo Ferrante	42	4	30	3	6	0	6	1
	DF	(Italy) ITA	Bernardo Rogora	35	1	23	1	6	0	6	0
	DF	(Italy) ITA	Giuseppe Longoni	38	0	27	0	6	0	5	0
	MF	(Italy) ITA	Giancarlo De Sisti	39	3	27	2	6	1	6	0
	MF	(Italy) ITA	Salvatore Esposito	38	2	28	2	4	0	6	0
	MF	(Italy) ITA	Claudio Merlo	35	4	24+1	3	5	1	5	0
	FW	(Italy) ITA	Luciano Chiarugi	38	16	27	12	6	2	5	2
	FW	(Italy) ITA	Mario Maraschi	33	11	22	5	5	4	6	2
	FW	(Brazil) BRA	Amarildo	30	7	20	5	4	1	6	1
	GK	(Italy) ITA	Claudio Bandoni	6	-8	5	-8	1	-0	0	-0
	FW	(Italy) ITA	Francesco Rizzo	29	2	17+3	2	5	0	4	0
	FW	(Italy) ITA	Giorgio Mariani	14	2	10+2	2	2	0	0	0
	MF	(Italy) ITA	Pierluigi Cencetti	14	0	7+3	0	2	0	2	0
	DF	(Italy) ITA	Francesco Carpenetti	8	0	5+1	0	1	0	1	0
	MF	(Italy) ITA	Giovan Battista Pirovano	5	0	3+1	0	0	0	1	0
	DF	(Italy) ITA	Fabrizio Berni	2	0	2	0				
	FW	(Italy) ITA	Fabio Ferrario	1	0	1	0	0	0	0	0
	DF	(Italy) ITA	Vasco Marinelli	0	0	0	0				
	MF	(Italy) ITA	Giovanni Marongiu	0	0	0	0				
	FW	(Italy) ITA	Gennari	0	0	0	0				
	MF	(Italy) ITA	Macchi	0	0	0	0				

- Source: http://calcio-seriea.net/presenze/1969/662/
