= List of ACF Fiorentina seasons =

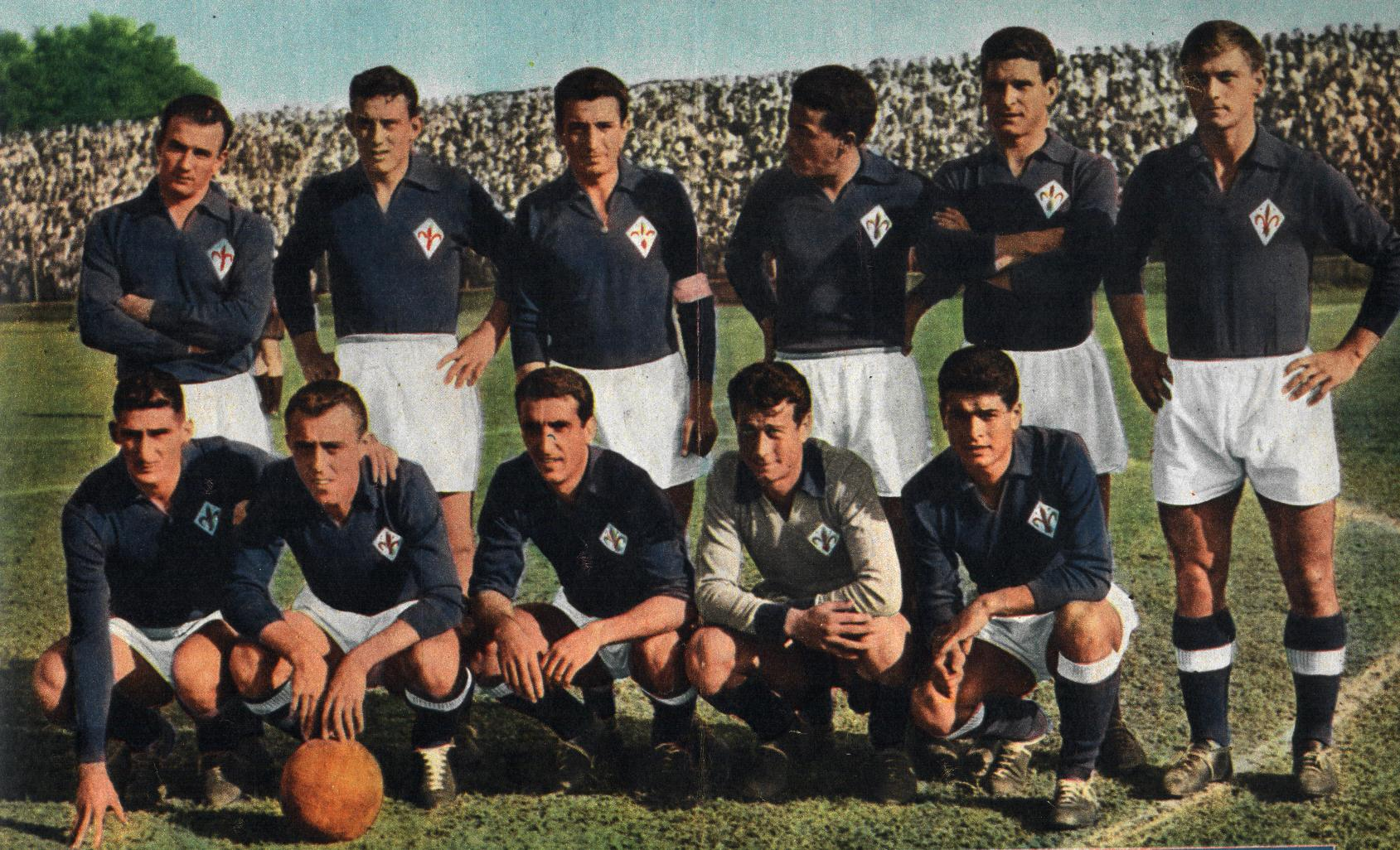
The Fiorentina team during the 1955–56 season in which they won their first league title

Associazione Calcio Firenze Fiorentina is an Italian professional football club based in Florence, Tuscany. The club was formed on 29 August 1926 by a merger of CS Firenze and PG Libertas as Associazione Calcio Firenze, and played its first competitive match on 3 October against Pisa. Renamed to Associazione Calcio Fiorentina in 1927, the club won their first piece of silverware, the 1939–40 Coppa Italia, in their first season following their promotion back to Serie A after a one-season stay in the second tier. Their first scudetto (league championship) was won in the 1955–56 season, losing only once in the 34-game season; this was followed by four consecutive second-place finishes. On an international level, following their league win, Fiorentina took part for the first time in a European competition, becoming also the first Italian club to play in a European Cup final (losing 2–0 to Real Madrid). In 1961, Fiorentina became the first Italian club to win a European competition, winning the European Cup Winners' Cup in a two-legged final against Rangers.

Fiorentina's second league title win came in the 1968–69 season, with the winning team, guided by Bruno Pesaola, being dubbed as the Fiorentina Ye-Ye due to their youth. In the years to follow, Fiorentina's performances deteriorated (which included near-relegation finishes), although they did win the 1974–75 Coppa Italia. In the 1980s, the club almost collected their third Serie A title in the 1981–82 season, however they lost it to Juventus in the last game of the season. The decade ended with a runners-up finish in the 1989–90 UEFA Cup, losing to Juventus 3–1 on aggregate.

In the 1992–93 season, after a 55-year spell in the top division, Fiorentina were relegated to Serie B, despite Gabriel Batistuta's 16 league goals. Batistuta spearheaded Fiorentina's return to Serie A the following season and his career with the Florence-based side saw him finish as the club's top scorer for nine consecutive seasons. In the post-promotion years, the club added two further Coppa Italia titles (in the 1995–96 and 2000–01 seasons) and a Supercoppa Italiana win in 1996 to their trophy haul. In the wake of the 2001–02 season, the club entered administration after financial problems. Re-formed initially as Florentia Viola in Serie C2, the fourth level in the Italian league football hierarchy, and then later as ACF Fiorentina, the club returned to the top-tier league in the 2003–04 season.

The club has won Serie A twice, Serie B three times, the Coppa Italia six times, the Supercoppa Italiana once and the UEFA Cup Winner's Cup once. As of the end of the 2023–24 season, Fiorentina has played eighty-seven seasons in Serie A, seven in Serie B and one season in Serie D (or equivalent). This list details the club's achievements in major competitions, and the top scorers for each season. Top scorers in bold† were also the top scorers within Fiorentina's league division that season.

== Key ==
- Pld = Matches played
- W = Matches won
- D = Matches drawn
- L = Matches lost
- GF = Goals for
- GA = Goals against
- Pts = Points
- Pos = Final position
- R32 = Round of 32
- R16 = Round of 16
- R1 = Round 1
- R2 = Round 2
- R3 = Round 3
- GS = Group stage
- 2GS = Second Group stage
- QF = Quarter-finals
- SF = Semi-finals
- PD = Prima Divisione
- DN = Divisione Nazionale
- Serie A = Serie A
- Serie B = Serie B
- Serie C2 = Serie C2
- CI = Coppa Italia
- SCI = Supercoppa Italiana
- CL = UEFA Champions League (formerly European Cup, 1955–1992)
- EL = UEFA Europa League (formerly UEFA Cup, 1971–2008)
- ECL = UEFA Conference League (2021–)
- CWC = UEFA Cup Winners' Cup (1960–1999)
- MC = Mitropa Cup (1927–1992)
- GT = Grasshoppers Trophy (1952–1957)
- ICFC = Inter-Cities Fairs Cup (1955–1971)
- AILC = Anglo-Italian League Cup (1969–1976)

1st or W	Winners
2nd or RU	Runners-up
↑	Promoted
↓	Relegated

== Seasons ==
Correct as of the end of the 2025–26 season. (Note: Goal tallies are for the competitions listed only; friendly matches are not included. Divisions are not sorted alphabetically, but based on their placing in the Italian football league system at that time.) (Note: From 1905 until 1993–94, two points were awarded for a win, and one for a draw. From the 1994–95 Serie A season onwards, three points have been awarded for a win.)

Results of league and cup competitions by season
Season	League									CI	SCI	CL	EL	Other (Note: Includes the UEFA Cup Winners' Cup, UEFA Europa Conference League, Inter-Cities Fairs Cup, Mitropa Cup, Anglo-Italian League Cup and the Grasshoppers Trophy.)	Top scorer(s)	
Season	Division	Pld	W	D	L	GF	GA	Pts	Pos	CI	SCI	CL	EL	Other	Player(s)	Goals
1926–27	PD	18	7	3	8	24	30	17	6th						Rodolfo Volk	11
1927–28	PD	14	7	4	3	31	14	18	2nd ↑						Luigi Miconi	14
1928–29	DN	30	5	2	23	26	96	12	16th ↓						Mario Meucci	8
1929–30	Serie B	34	16	8	10	64	39	40	4th						Raffaele Rivolo	15
1930–31	Serie B	34	18	10	6	54	27	46	1st ↑						Pilade Luchetti Oliviero Serdoz	9
1931–32	Serie A	34	16	7	11	54	35	39	4th						**Pedro Petrone†** (Note: The 1931–32 capocannoniere (league top-scorer) award was shared with Angelo Schiavio (playing for Bologna).)	25
1932–33	Serie A	34	16	7	11	48	38	39	6th						Pedro Petrone	12
1933–34	Serie A	34	12	12	10	46	53	36	6th						Vinicio Viani	16
1934–35	Serie A	30	15	9	6	39	23	39	3rd					QF^{MC}	Vinicio Viani	12
1935–36	Serie A	30	10	7	13	32	42	27	12th	SF					Cinzio Scagliotti	8
1936–37	Serie A	30	9	12	9	34	32	30	9th	R32					Vinicio Viani	10
1937–38	Serie A	30	3	9	18	28	60	15	16th ↓	R1					Vinicio Viani	7
1938–39	Serie B	34	16	13	5	62	30	45	1st ↑	R32					Romeo Menti	17
1939–40	Serie A	30	9	6	15	37	48	24	13th	**W**					Romeo Menti	9
1940–41	Serie A	30	14	6	10	60	49	34	4th	QF					Romeo Menti	17
1941–42	Serie A	30	11	5	14	51	50	27	9th	R32					Renato Gei	18
1942–43	Serie A	30	12	5	13	55	61	29	8th	R32					Angelo Bollano Renato Gei	11
1943–45 (Note: No competitive football was played between 1943 and 1945 due to the Second World War.)	Not held	—	—	—	—	—	—	—	—						—	—
1945–46	Serie A-B	20	10	3	7	32	16	23	5th						Mario Gritti	12
1946–47	Serie A	38	10	12	16	46	69	32	17th						Otello Badiali	9
1947–48	Serie A	40	18	5	17	49	55	41	7th						Alberto Galassi	15
1948–49	Serie A	38	15	8	15	51	60	38	10th						Alberto Galassi	14
1949–50	Serie A	38	18	8	12	76	57	44	5th						Alberto Galassi	24
1950–51	Serie A	38	18	8	12	52	42	44	5th						Giancarlo Vitali	9
1951–52	Serie A	38	17	9	12	52	38	43	4th						Dan Ekner André Roosenburg	10
1952–53	Serie A	34	11	11	12	31	47	33	7th						Amos Mariani	6
1953–54	Serie A	34	15	14	5	45	27	44	4th						Giancarlo Bacci	13
1954–55	Serie A	34	14	11	9	49	48	39	5th						Giuseppe Virgili	15
1955–56	Serie A	34	20	13	1	59	20	53	**1st**						Giuseppe Virgili	21
1956–57	Serie A	34	16	10	8	55	40	43	2nd			RU		**W**^{GT}	Miguel Montuori	14
1957–58	Serie A	34	16	11	7	56	36	43	2nd	RU					Miguel Montuori	12
1958–59	Serie A	34	20	9	5	95	35	49	2nd	QF					Kurt Hamrin	26
1959–60	Serie A	34	20	7	7	68	31	47	2nd	RU				R1^{MC}	Kurt Hamrin	26
1960–61	Serie A	34	13	11	10	46	34	37	7th	**W**				**W**^{CWC}	Kurt Hamrin	14
1961–62	Serie A	34	19	8	7	57	32	46	3rd	R16				RU^{CWC}; GS^{MC}	**Aurelio Milani†** (Note: The 1961–62 capocannoniere award was shared with José Altafini (playing for Milan).)	22
1962–63	Serie A	34	15	8	11	52	32	38	6th	R2					Kurt Hamrin	15
1963–64	Serie A	34	14	10	10	43	27	38	4th	SF					Kurt Hamrin	23
1964–65	Serie A	34	16	9	9	52	37	41	5th	R1				RU^{MC}; R1^{ICFC}	**Alberto Orlando†** (Note: The 1964–65 capocannoniere award was shared with Sandro Mazzola (playing for Internazionale).)	17
1965–66	Serie A	34	16	11	7	45	22	43	4th	**W**				**W**^{MC}; R2^{ICFC}	Kurt Hamrin	12
1966–67	Serie A	34	15	13	6	53	29	43	5th	QF				SF^{MC}; R1^{CWC}	Kurt Hamrin	16
1967–68	Serie A	30	13	9	8	35	23	35	4th	R16				R2^{ICFC}	Mario Maraschi	12
1968–69	Serie A	30	16	13	1	38	18	45	**1st**	GS				R3^{ICFC}; GS^{AILC}	Mario Maraschi	14
1969–70	Serie A	30	15	6	9	40	33	36	5th	QF		QF			Luciano Chiarugi	12
1970–71	Serie A	30	3	19	8	26	32	25	13th	GS				R2^{ICFC}	Alessandro Vitali	6
1971–72	Serie A	30	12	12	6	28	20	36	6th	R2				RU^{MC}	Sergio Clerici	10
1972–73	Serie A	30	16	5	9	39	26	37	4th	R1			R1	RU^{AILC}	Sergio Clerici	10
1973–74	Serie A	30	10	13	7	32	26	33	6th	R1			R1		Nello Saltutti	7
1974–75	Serie A	30	9	13	8	31	27	31	8th	**W**				GS^{MC}	Gianfranco Casarsa	7
1975–76	Serie A	30	9	9	12	39	39	27	9th	R2				R2^{CWC}	Claudio Desolati	10
1976–77	Serie A	30	12	11	7	38	31	35	3rd	R1				3rd^{MC}	Claudio Desolati	9
1977–78	Serie A	30	7	11	12	28	37	25	13th	R2			R1		Ezio Sella	7
1978–79	Serie A	30	10	12	8	26	26	32	7th	R1					Ezio Sella	10
1979–80	Serie A	30	11	11	8	33	27	33	5th	R1					Giancarlo Antognoni	8
1980–81	Serie A	30	9	14	7	28	25	32	5th	QF					Giancarlo Antognoni	9
1981–82	Serie A	30	17	11	2	48	14	45	2nd	QF					Francesco Graziani	11
1982–83	Serie A	30	12	10	8	36	25	34	5th	R1			R1		Giancarlo Antognoni	10
1983–84	Serie A	30	12	12	6	48	31	36	3rd	QF					Paolo Monelli	12
1984–85	Serie A	30	8	13	9	33	31	29	9th	SF			R2		Paolo Monelli	7
1985–86	Serie A	30	10	13	7	29	23	33	4th	SF					Daniel Passarella	15
1986–87	Serie A	30	8	10	12	30	35	26	10th	GS			R1		Ramón Díaz	10
1987–88	Serie A	30	9	10	11	29	33	28	8th	R16					Ramón Díaz	12
1988–89	Serie A	34	12	10	12	44	43	34	7th	QF					Roberto Baggio	24
1989–90	Serie A	34	7	14	13	41	42	28	12th	GS			RU		Roberto Baggio	19
1990–91	Serie A	34	8	15	11	40	34	31	12th	R16					Diego Fuser	9
1991–92	Serie A	34	10	12	12	44	41	32	12th	R16					Gabriel Batistuta	14
1992–93	Serie A	34	8	14	12	53	56	30	16th ↓	R16					Gabriel Batistuta	19
1993–94	Serie B	38	17	16	5	53	19	50	1st ↑	R16					Gabriel Batistuta	19
1994–95	Serie A	34	12	11	11	61	57	47	10th	QF					**Gabriel Batistuta†**	29
1995–96	Serie A	34	17	8	9	53	41	59	4th	**W**					Gabriel Batistuta	26
1996–97	Serie A	34	10	15	9	46	41	45	9th	R16	**W**			SF^{CWC}	Gabriel Batistuta	23
1997–98	Serie A	34	15	12	7	65	36	57	5th	QF					Gabriel Batistuta	24
1998–99	Serie A	34	16	8	10	55	41	56	3rd	RU			R32		Gabriel Batistuta	26
1999–2000	Serie A	34	13	12	9	48	38	51	7th	QF		2GS			Gabriel Batistuta	29
2000–01	Serie A	34	10	13	11	53	52	43	9th	**W**			R1		Enrico Chiesa	27
2001–02	Serie A	34	5	7	22	29	63	22	17th ↓	R2	RU		R32		Nuno Gomes	7
2002–03 (Note: The club filed for bankruptcy at the end of the 2001–02 season. Unable to raise sufficient funds to register in Serie B, the club had to restart in Serie C2 under the name Florentia Viola.)	Serie C2	34	20	10	4	56	20	70	1st ↑						**Christian Riganò†**	30
2003–04 (Note: With Serie B set for an expansion to 24 clubs for 2003–04, the club's owners, the Della Valle family, successfully argued that Florentia should be granted the 24th slot on the basis of "historical merits". It was widely seen as the Italian football federation compensating Florentia for being relegated two divisions instead of the normal one in case of bankruptcy. Florentia Viola also won the rights to use the original Fiorentina name, the club being renamed to ACF Fiorentina prior to the 2003–04 season.)	Serie B	46	19	16	11	53	48	73	6th ↑						Christian Riganò	23
2004–05	Serie A	38	9	15	14	42	50	42	16th	QF					Fabrizio Miccoli	12
2005–06	Serie A	38	22	8	8	66	41	44 (Note: Fiorentina were docked 30 points for their involvement in the 2006 Italian football scandal.)	9th	R16					**Luca Toni†**	33
2006–07	Serie A	38	21	10	7	62	31	58 (Note: Fiorentina were docked 15 points (reduced from 19) for their involvement in the 2006 Italian football scandal.)	6th	R2					Adrian Mutu Luca Toni	16
2007–08	Serie A	38	19	9	10	55	39	66	4th	QF			SF		Adrian Mutu	23
2008–09	Serie A	38	21	5	12	53	38	68	4th	R16		GS	R16		Alberto Gilardino	25
2009–10	Serie A	38	13	8	17	48	47	47	11th	SF		R16			Alberto Gilardino	18
2010–11	Serie A	38	12	15	11	49	44	51	9th	R16					Alberto Gilardino	12
2011–12	Serie A	38	11	13	14	37	43	46	13th	R16					Stevan Jovetić	14
2012–13	Serie A	38	21	7	9	72	44	70	4th	QF					Stevan Jovetić	13
2013–14	Serie A	38	19	8	11	65	44	65	4th	RU			R16		Giuseppe Rossi	17
2014–15	Serie A	38	18	10	10	61	46	64	4th	SF			SF		Mario Gómez Josip Iličić	10
2015–16	Serie A	38	18	10	10	60	42	64	5th	R16			R32		Josip Iličić	15
2016–17	Serie A	38	16	12	10	63	57	60	8th	QF			R32		Nikola Kalinić	20
2017–18	Serie A	38	16	9	13	54	46	57	8th	QF					Giovanni Simeone	14
2018–19	Serie A	38	8	17	13	47	45	41	16th	SF					Federico Chiesa	12
2019–20	Serie A	38	12	13	13	51	48	49	10th	QF					Federico Chiesa	11
2020–21	Serie A	38	9	13	16	47	59	40	13th	R16					Dušan Vlahović	21
2021–22	Serie A	38	19	5	14	59	51	62	7th	SF					Dušan Vlahović	20
2022–23	Serie A	38	15	11	12	53	43	56	8th	RU				RU^{ECL}	Arthur Cabral	17
2023–24	Serie A	38	17	9	12	61	46	60	8th	SF	SF			RU^{ECL}	Nicolás González	16
2024–25	Serie A	38	19	8	11	60	41	65	6th	R16				SF^{ECL}	Moise Kean	25
2025–26	Serie A	38	9	5	14	41	50	42	15th	R16				QF^{ECL}	Albert Guðmundsson	10
