= ACF Fiorentina Youth Sector =

Fiorentina Youth Sector
- Full name: Associazione Calcio Firenze Fiorentina Youth Sector
- Nicknames: Viola (Purple), Gigliati (Lilies)
- Ground: Rocco B. Commisso Viola Park
- Capacity: 3,000 (Curva Fiesole Stadium); 1,500 (Davide Astori Stadium)
- Chairman: Giuseppe B. Commisso
- Head coach: Aurelio Andreazzoli (Primavera 1)
- League: Campionato Primavera 1
- 2025–26: Campionato Primavera 1, winner
- Website: www.acffiorentina.com/en/fiorentina-youth-men-u20
Home colours	Away colours	Third colours

ACF Fiorentina Youth Sector (Italian: Settore Giovanile) comprises the under-20 team and the academy of Italian professional football club ACF Fiorentina. The side currently compete in the Campionato Primavera 1, which they have won four times, and the Coppa Italia Primavera, which they won eight times. Additionally, they have won the Supercoppa Primavera three times, most recently in 2022. The club has also taken part in the annual Torneo di Viareggio, an international tournament of which they are nine-time winners.

The Youth Sector is made up of various squads divided by age groups. All of the squads train at the first team's main training ground, "Rocco B. Commisso Viola Park" Training Center in Bagno a Ripoli.

== History ==
Fiorentina has historically placed great importance on nurturing local talent and continues to do so. Many young players have successfully transitioned from the youth academy to the first team, with notable examples like Claudio Merlo, who spent most of his career in Florence. Merlo joined Fiorentina at the age of 17 after moving from Rome and quickly rose through the ranks. Alongside players like Luciano Chiarugi, they became a key figure in the Fiorentina team of the 1960s, famously debuting in Serie A against the legendary Inter side in 1965. Their contributions helped the team win the Mitropa Cup and the Italian Cup, culminating in Fiorentina's iconic 1969 Scudetto triumph.

In the 1960s, Fiorentina's youth sector achieved its first victory in the prestigious Viareggio Tournament in 1966. The 1970s saw further success with the club winning its first youth league title in the Campionato Primavera, followed by a second title in the 1979–1980 season. During the same decade, the Viola triumphed four more times at the Torneo di Viareggio. The 1980s brought a third and final Campionato Primavera title, while international victories at Viareggio reached a total of eight by 1992. The growth of Fiorentina's youth academy continued to produce successful talents, with numerous players debuting in the first team during the 2000s, including Federico Bernardeschi, Federico Chiesa, and Serbian striker Dusan Vlahovic. The team also embarked on a remarkable winning streak in the Coppa Italia Primavera, securing a total of eight titles by the end of the 2023–2024 season, with five victories in six consecutive finals.

In the 2024–25 Campionato Primavera 1 season, Fiorentina reached the final and consequently qualified for their first appearance in the Youth League. Fiorentina Primavera lost 3–0 to Inter in the final but secured a place in the Domestic Champions Path of the competition. In the second round, Fiorentina were eliminated by Legia Warsaw, losing 6–4 on aggregate.

After 34 years, Fiorentina U18 have won the 2026 edition of the Torneo di Viareggio, reaching a total of nine titles—matching the record held by AC Milan and Juventus. In the same season, after a 43-year wait, Fiorentina Primavera were crowned Italian champions following a 2–1 victory over Parma in the final phase of the championship, held at the Rocco B. Commisso Viola Park.

== Structure ==
The Youth Sector is divided into 10 squads: "Primavera" (under-20), under-18, under-17, under-16, under-15, under-13, under-12, under-11, under-10 and under-9.

Fiorentina owns its own training ground with the complex set to provide a single hub for both the men's and women's first teams, as well as the youth academy.

=== Academies ===
The Fiorentina Youth Sector includes a network of academies that operate according to the technical and educational model established by ACF Fiorentina. These academies are dedicated to the training and development of male and female football players, promoting consistent standards of coaching and player education across different levels.

==== National activity ====
Throughout Italy, Fiorentina's affiliates are divided into Centri di Formazione and Affiliate.

Fiorentina's Affiliated Clubs are a point of reference for their respective regional and national territories. Renewed in 2020, the Project now has a network of around 70 football organizations that carry out grassroots and competitive youth activities under the technical guidance of a dedicated staff since the 2024/25 season.

==== International projects ====
The international projects linked to the Fiorentina Youth Sector comprise a series of programmes designed to share the club's training methods with players, coaches and partner organisations abroad. These initiatives include academy partnerships, training experiences and educational activities that apply the Fiorentina model in different countries.

=== Viola Park ===
Viola Park is the new Viola home located within the training center in Bagno a Ripoli, near Florence, and covers an area of approximately 31 hectares, making it one of the largest sports facilities in Europe. It houses the club's headquarters, the training pitches of the men's and women's first teams, and the pitches used by the youth teams.

The Training Center was inaugurated on 11 October 2023.

==== Stadium(s) ====
Viola Park also includes the 3000-capacity Curva Fiesole Stadium (Stadio Curva Fiesole) and the 1500-capacity Davide Astori Stadium (Stadio Davide Astori): the Curva Fiesole Stadium hosts the women's first team and the men's Primavera side, while the Davide Astori Stadium is used by all the other teams.

Stadio Curva Fiesole received UEFA licence.

== Primavera (under-20) ==
As of 8 November 2026

=== Current squad ===
Note: Flags indicate national team as defined under FIFA eligibility rules; some limited exceptions apply. Players may hold more than one non-FIFA nationality.

No.	Pos.	Nation	Player
1	GK	ITA	Lorenzo Pinzani
3	DF	SUI	Arnis Ademi
4	MF	ITA	Salvatore Cianciulli
5	DF	CRO	Matko Bošković
6	MF	CIV	Bala Keita
7	MF	ITA	Angelo Lorusso
8	MF	ITA	Samuel Beldenti
9	FW	ITA	Fortune Egharevba
10	MF	ITA	Davide Atzeni
11	FW	ITA	Alberto Angeloni
14	FW	GAM	Sulayman Jallow
16	DF	ITA	Dennis Beldenti
17	MF	ARG	Federico Matarán
18	FW	ITA	Giuseppe Forte
19	FW	ITA	Francesco Forza

No.	Pos.	Nation	Player
21	MF	ITA	Christian Melai
23	DF	ITA	Federico Melani
26	DF	ITA	Antonio Pirrò
28	FW	ITA	Brando Mazzeo
29	FW	ITA	Thomas Campaniello (on loan from Empoli)
30	GK	ITA	Gianmaria Fei
31	FW	ITA	Mario Pietropaolo
33	MF	ITA	Piergiorgio Bonanno
40	DF	ROU	Robert Corduneanu
44	DF	ITA	Niccolò Turnone (Captain)
73	DF	ITA	Alessandro Perrotti
77	DF	ITA	Gabriele Colaciuri
80	MF	ITA	Angelo Martini
97	FW	ITA	Federico Croci
99	GK	ITA	Mattia Magalotti

=== Out on loan ===
Note: Flags indicate national team as defined under FIFA eligibility rules; some limited exceptions apply. Players may hold more than one non-FIFA nationality.

No. / Pos. / Nation / Player; — / GK / ITA / Brando Dolfi (at Virtus Verona until 30 June 2027)	No. / Pos. / Nation / Player; — / DF / ITA / Edoardo Sturli (at ChievoVerona until 30 June 2027)

=== Current technical staff ===
Role	Name
Head coach	(Italy) Aurelio Andreazzoli
Goalkeeping coach	(Italy) Massimiliano Benassi
Scout	(Italy) Davide Doné

=== Managerial history ===
- (Italy) Luciano Chiarugi (1993–1998)
- (Italy) Luciano Bruni (1998–2004)
- (Italy) Claudio Gabetta (2004–2005)
- (Italy) Adriano Cadregari (2005–2007)
- (Italy) Alberto Bollini (2007–2009)
- (Italy) Renato Buso (2009–2011)
- (Italy) Leonardo Semplici (2011–2014)
- (Italy) Federico Guidi (2014–2017)
- (Italy) Emiliano Bigica (2017–2020)
- (Italy) Alberto Aquilani (2020–2023)
- (Italy) Daniele Galloppa (2023–2026)
- (Italy) Aurelio Andreazzoli (2026–present)

== Honours ==
=== National ===
==== Primavera ====
- Campionato Nazionale Primavera – Primavera 1: 4
  - 1970–1971, 1979–1980, 1982–1983, 2025–2026
- Coppa Italia Primavera: 8
  - 1979–1980, 1995–1996, 2010–2011, 2018–2019, 2019–2020, 2020–2021, 2021–2022, 2023–2024
- Supercoppa Primavera: 3
  - 2011, 2021, 2022

==== Other Youth teams ====
- Berretti: 2
  - 1975–1976, 1978–1979
- Under-17 Allievi: 3
  - 1985–1986, 1988–1989, 2008–2009
- Under-15 Giovanissimi: 1
  - 2010–2011
- Juniores Nazionali: 2
  - 1957–1958, 1958–1959

=== International ===
==== Primavera ====
- Torneo di Viareggio: 9
  - 1966, 1973, 1974, 1978, 1979, 1982, 1988, 1992, 2026

== Notable former youth team players ==
The following is a list of players who have played in Fiorentina's Primavera squad and represented their country at full international level and/or have played regularly at a high-level club football. Players who are currently playing at Fiorentina, or for another club on loan from Fiorentina, are highlighted in bold.

- (Ghana) Maxwell Acosty
- (Italy) Lorenzo Amatucci
- (Italy) Daniele Amerini
- (Italy) Christian Amoroso
- (Senegal) Khouma Babacar
- (Venezuela) Luis Balbo
- (Italy) Giacomo Banchelli
- (Italy) Marco Baroni
- (Italy) Federico Bernardeschi
- (Italy) Alessandro Bianco
- (Italy) Gianfranco Bozzao
- (Italy) Riccardo Braschi
- (Italy) Davide Brivio
- (Italy) Stefano Carobbi
- (Italy) Sergio Carpanesi
- (Italy) Domenico Caso
- (Italy) Gaetano Castrovilli
- (Italy) Luca Cecconi
- (Italy) Pierluigi Cencetti
- (Italy) Luciano Chiarugi
- (Italy) Federico Chiesa
- (Italy) **Pietro Comuzzo**
- (Italy) Danilo D'Ambrosio
- (Italy) Dario D'Ambrosio
- (Italy) Claudio Desolati
- (Italy) Samuel Di Carmine
- (Brazil) Alan Empereur
- (Italy) Salvatore Esposito
- (Italy) Costantino Favasuli
- (Italy) **Jacopo Fazzini**
- (Italy) Francesco Flachi
- (Italy) **Niccolò Fortini**
- (Italy) Salvatore Fresi
- (Italy) Giovanni Galli
- (Italy) Daniele Ghilardi
- (Italy) Pierluigi Gollini
- (Ivory Coast) Cedric Gondo
- (Italy) Piero Gonfiantini
- (Italy) Ricciotti Greatti
- (Romania) Ianis Hagi
- (Italy) Pietro Iemmello
- (Italy) Michael Kayode
- (Italy) **Eddy Kouadio**
- (Bosnia and Herzegovina) **Eman Košpo**
- (Bulgaria) Dimo Krastev
- (Italy) Marco Landucci
- (France) Matthias Lepiller
- (Italy) **Luca Lezzerini**
- (Italy) Alberto Malusci
- (Italy) Gianluca Mancini
- (Italy) Pierpaolo Manservisi
- (Italy) Gianmatteo Mareggini
- (Italy) Giorgio Mariani
- (Brazil) Ryder Matos
- (Italy) Massimo Mattolini
- (Czech Republic) Ondřej Mazuch
- (Italy) Walter Mazzarri
- (Italy) Claudio Merlo
- (Italy) Roberto Mirri
- (Slovenia) Jan Mlakar
- (Romania) Louis Munteanu
- (Italy) Andrea Orlandini
- (Italy) Massimo Paganin
- (Italy) Andrea Pazzagli
- (Italy) Giuseppe Pellicanò
- (El Salvador) Joshua Pérez
- (Italy) Cristiano Piccini
- (Italy) **Luca Ranieri**
- (Italy) Maurizio Restelli
- (Italy) Moreno Roggi
- (Italy) Andrea Seculin
- (Switzerland) Haris Seferović
- (Italy) Luigi Simoni
- (Italy) **Riccardo Sottil**
- (Italy) Francesco Tavano
- (Italy) Alessio Tendi
- (Italy) Vittorio Tosto
- (Greece) Georgios Vakouftsis
- (Italy) Lorenzo Venuti
- (Italy) Luca Vigiani
- (Italy) Emiliano Viviano
- (Serbia) Dusan Vlahovic
- (Italy) Cristiano Zanetti
- (Italy) Nicolò Zaniolo

== European record ==
As of match played 28 October 2026

Season	Round	Opposition	1st leg	2nd leg	Aggregate
2025–2026	Second round	(Poland) Legia Warsaw	1-4 (A)	3-2 (H)	4–6
2026–2027	Second round	(Bulgaria) PFC Septemvri Sofia	5-0 (H)	3-0 (A)	8–0
