= 1967–68 Coppa Italia =

Tournament details
- Country: Italy
- Dates: 3 Sept 1967 – 30 June 1968
- Teams: 37

Final positions
- Champions: Torino (3rd title)

Tournament statistics
- Matches played: 49
- Goals scored: 129 (2.63 per match)
- Top goal scorer: Lucio Mujesan (6 goals)

The 1967–68 Coppa Italia, the 21st Coppa Italia was an Italian Football Federation domestic cup competition won by Torino.

== Serie A ==
=== First round ===
Home team	Score	Away team
Milan	2–0	Cagliari
Torino	1–0	Sampdoria
Fiorentina	4–1	Roma
Napoli	4–1	SPAL
Vicenza	1–2	Atalanta
Juventus	0–0 (aet) *	Varese
Internazionale	4–2	Brescia
Mantova	0–4	Bologna

* Varese qualify after drawing of lots.

=== Second round ===
Home team	Score	Away team
Milan	1–1 (p: 6–4)	Varese
Torino	1–0	Napoli
Bologna	2–1	Fiorentina
Internazionale	4–1	Atalanta

The four winners qualify for the Quarter–finals.

== Serie B ==
=== First round ===
Home team	Score	Away team
Venezia	3–1	Padova
Bari	1–0	Genoa
Hellas Verona	1–0	Lecco
Lazio	0–0 (aet) *	Perugia
Modena	3–2 (aet)	Reggiana
Monza	4–2	Novara
Potenza	3–2	Messina
Palermo	1–0	Foggia

* Lazio qualify after drawing of lots.

=== Intermediate round ===
Home team	Score	Away team
Bari	3–2 (aet)	Catania
Catanzaro	2–1 (aet)	Potenza
Monza	0–1	Livorno
Reggina	1–0	Lazio
Pisa	1–0	Hellas Verona

=== Second round ===
Home team	Score	Away team
Bari	2–0	Livorno
Catanzaro	2–0	Palermo
Reggina	1–0 (aet)	Venezia
Pisa	1–0	Modena

The four winners qualify for the Quarter–finals and the two groups will be added together.

== Quarter–finals ==
Serie B team	Agg.	Serie A team	1st leg	2nd leg
Bari	2–5	Milan	1–1	1–4
Catanzaro	0–2	Torino	0–0	0–2
Reggina	2–7	Bologna	2–3	0–4
Pisa	1–2	Internazionale	1–1	0–1

== Final group ==
Pos	Team	Pld	W	D	L	GF	GA	GD	Pts
1	Torino	6	3	3	0	9	2	+7	9
2	Milan	6	2	3	1	8	6	+2	7
3	Internazionale	6	1	2	3	7	10	−3	4
4	Bologna	6	1	2	3	6	12	−6	4

== Top goalscorers ==
Rank	Player	Club	Goals
1	(Italy) Lucio Mujesan	Bari	6
2	(Brazil) Sergio Clerici	Bologna	5
3	(Italy) Angelo Sormani	Milan	3
3	(Italy) Gianni Rivera	Milan	3
3	(Italy) Pierino Prati	Milan	3
3	(Italy) Marcello Tentorio	Bologna	3
