= Bertogna =

Bertogna is an Italian surname. Notable people with the surname include:

- Arno Bertogna (born 1959), Australian association footballer
- Lucio Bertogna (born 1946), Italian footballer

== See also ==
- Bertagna
