= Paolo Signorelli =

Paolo Signorelli might refer to:

- Paolo Signorelli (politician) (1934–2010), Italian politician
- Paolo Signorelli (footballer) (1939–2018), Italian footballer
