= Stavča Vas =

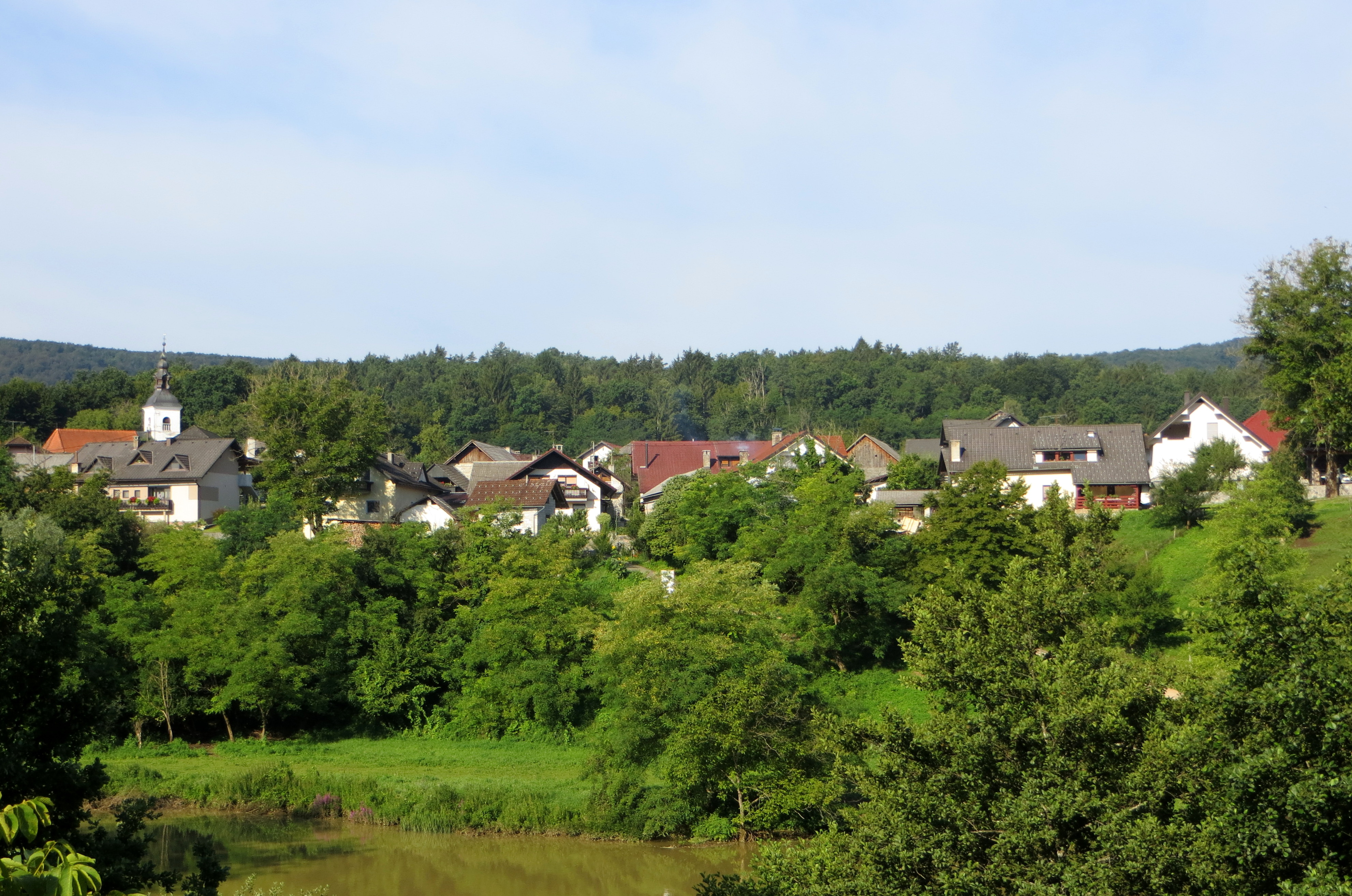

- Location in Slovenia
- Coordinates: 45°48′58.51″N 14°57′17.82″E
- Country: Slovenia
- Traditional region: Lower Carniola
- Statistical region: Southeast Slovenia
- Municipality: Žužemberk

Area
  - Total: 2.39 km^{2} (0.92 sq mi)
- Elevation: 207.9 m (682 ft)

Population (2002)
  - Total: 106

Stavča Vas (pronounced [ˈstaːu̯tʃa ˈʋaːs]; Slovene: Stavča vas, German: Deutschdorf) is a village on the right bank of the Krka River in the Municipality of Žužemberk in southeastern Slovenia. The area is part of the historical region of Lower Carniola. The municipality is now included in the Southeast Slovenia Statistical Region. The settlement includes the formerly independent village of Cegelnica (German: Ziegelstatt).

== Church ==
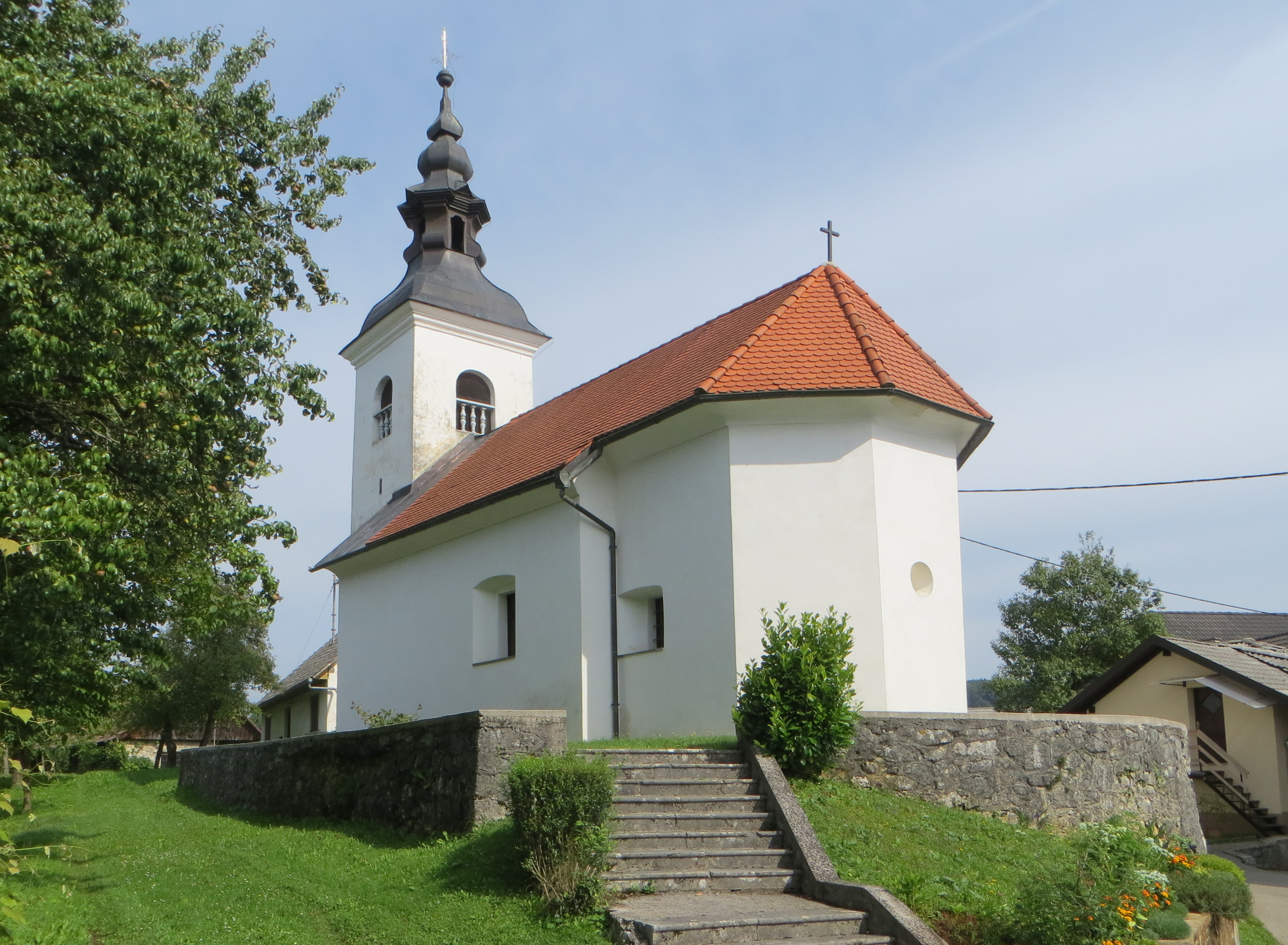
Saint Cantius's Church

The local church is dedicated to Saint Cantius (Slovene: sveti Kancijan) and belongs to the Parish of Žužemberk. It is a medieval building that was restyled in the Baroque style in the 18th century, when a new belfry was also built.
