= Cantius, Cantianus, and Cantianilla =

Coordinates: 46°14′17.91″N 14°21′21.14″E

Saints Cantius, Cantianus, and Cantianilla
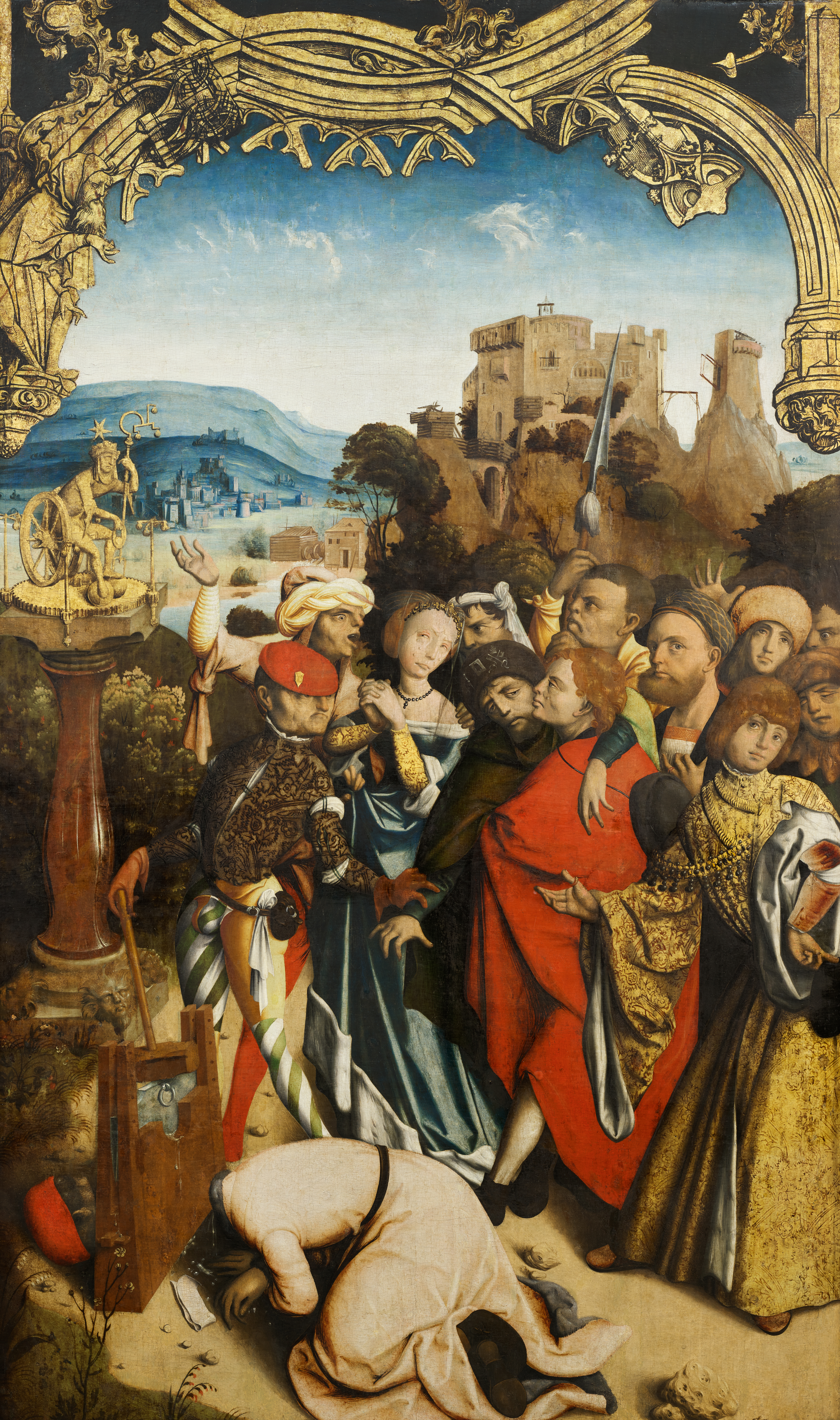
- Martyrdom of Cantius, Cantianus, and Cantianilla, from Krainburger Altar, 1510

Martyrs
- Died: c. AD 304; Aquae Gradatae (San Canzian d'Isonzo)
- Venerated in: Eastern Orthodox Church; Roman Catholic Church
- Major shrine: San Canzian d'Isonzo
- Feast: 31 May
- Attributes: Cantius and Cantianus are depicted as two youths; Cantianilla as a girl; Protus as a tutor with a staff and faggot; sword; the group fleeing in a chariot; beheaded before an idol; palms and sword.
- Patronage: children; Roman Catholic youth

Cantius, Cantianus, and Cantianilla (died 31 May 304) were Roman Christians who are venerated as saints and martyrs by the Eastern Orthodox Church and Roman Catholic Church. Their feast day is commemorated on 31 May.

== Narrative ==
A late legend states that the three were orphaned siblings, members of a noble Roman family, the Anicii, and related to the Emperor Carinus. Cantius and Cantianus were the brothers, while Cantianilla was the only sister. Protus was their tutor or guardian, and the Christian who converted the three siblings. When Diocletian began to persecute Christians, according to the legend, the four left Rome, selling their home and giving most of the proceeds to the poor. They reached their estate in Aquileia, where they had travelled to visit in his prison the holy priest Saint Chrysogonus. However, they were captured at a place called Aquae Gradatae (now called San Canzian d'Isonzo). They were beheaded after they refused to offer sacrifices to Roman idols.

== Veneration ==
A priest named Zoelus buried their bodies at the site. Saint Maximus of Turin subsequently preached a panegyric in their honor, and the saints are also mentioned by Venantius Fortunatus. His testimony, which he could draw from coeval documents, is very reliable, and states only that they were brothers of blood and that they were martyred together not far from Aquileia, while they were leaving from there in a chariot. Their cult was anciently diffused in Lombardy, France, and Germany. An early Christian basilica and tomb was discovered at San Canzian in recent times; it contained the remains of three individuals.
