= Bertagna =

Bertagna is a surname. Notable people with the surname include:

- Bruno Bertagna (1935−2013), Italian Roman Catholic archbishop
- Julie Bertagna (born 1962), Scottish writer
- Silvia Bertagna (born 1986), Italian freestyle skier

== See also ==
- Bertogna
