= Cegelnica, Žužemberk =

Cegelnica
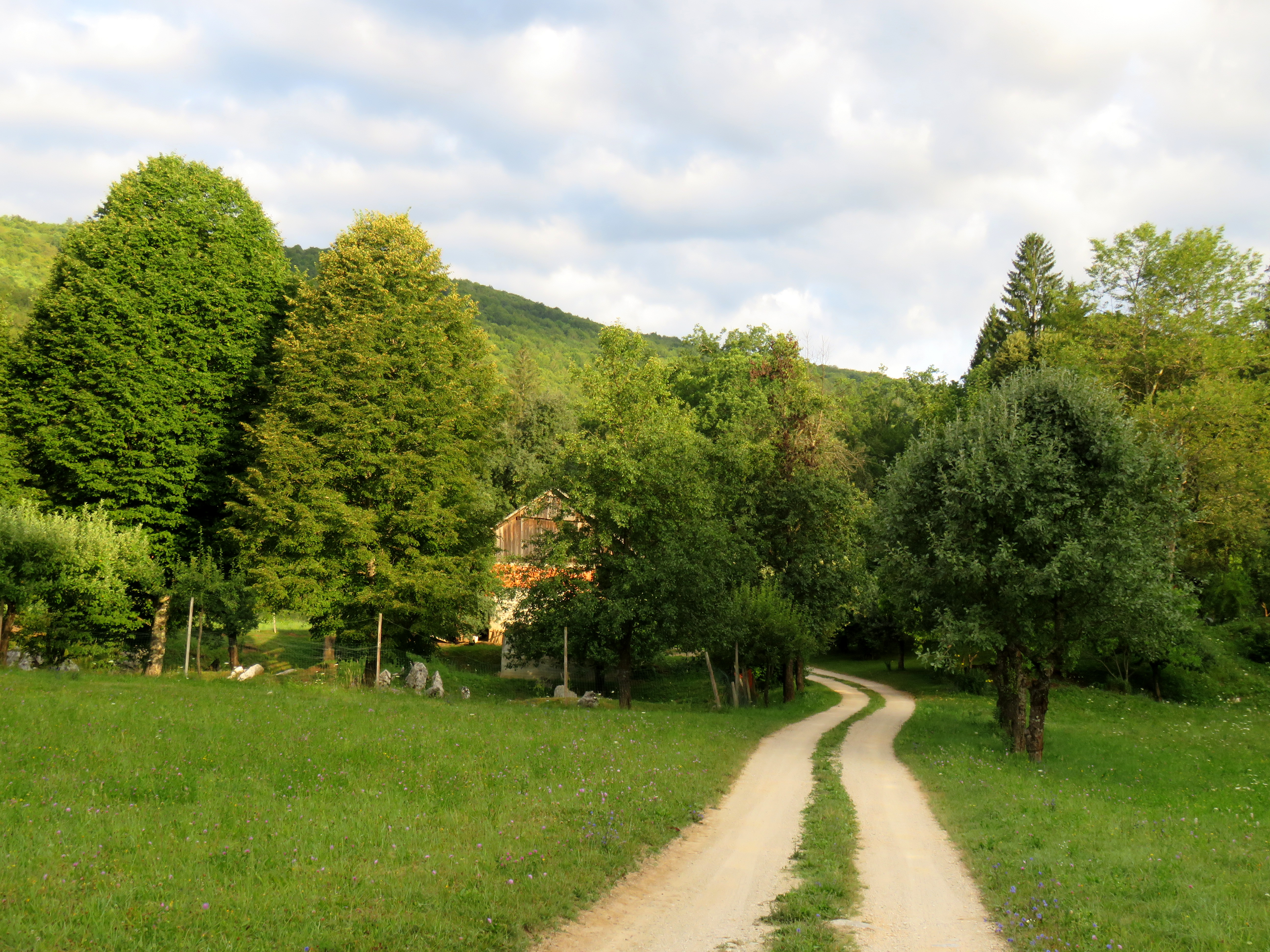

- Location in Slovenia
- Coordinates: 45°48′44″N 14°56′32″E
- Country: Slovenia
- Traditional region: Lower Carniola
- Statistical region: Central Slovenia
- Municipality: Žužemberk
- Elevation: 204 m (669 ft)

Cegelnica (pronounced [ˈtseːɡɛu̯nitsa], German: Ziegelstatt) is a formerly independent settlement south of Žužemberk in southeast Slovenia. It is now part of the village of Stavča Vas. It belongs to the Municipality of Žužemberk. It is part of the traditional region of Lower Carniola and is now included with the rest of the municipality in the Southeast Slovenia Statistical Region.

== Geography ==
Cegelnica lies south of the Krka River in an area with many sinkholes. Šica Creek flows south of the settlement, but it is dry except during rainy periods. It has its source at Boben Cave (Bobnova jama). Primož Hill (493 meters or 1,617 feet) rises south of Cegelnica.

== Name ==
The name Cegelnica and its German counterpart Ziegelstatt mean 'brickworks'. The name refers to a brickworks that formerly operated at the site.

== History ==
Cegelnica was annexed by Stavča Vas in 1953, ending its existence as an independent settlement.
