= 1969–70 Coppa Italia =

Tournament details
- Country: Italy
- Dates: 30 Aug 1969 – 20 May 1970
- Teams: 36

Final positions
- Champions: Bologna (1st title)

Tournament statistics
- Matches played: 78
- Goals scored: 166 (2.13 per match)
- Top goal scorer: Giuseppe Savoldi (6 goals)

The 1969–70 Coppa Italia, the 23rd Coppa Italia was an Italian Football Federation domestic cup competition won by Bologna.

== Group stage ==
=== Group 1 ===
Pos	Team	Pld	W	D	L	GF	GA	GD	Pts
1	Fiorentina	3	2	1	0	9	0	+9	5
2	Bari	3	1	1	1	2	8	−6	3
3	Livorno	3	0	2	1	1	2	−1	2
4	Arezzo	3	0	2	1	0	2	−2	2

Source: rsssf.com

=== Group 2 ===
Pos	Team	Pld	W	D	L	GF	GA	GD	Pts
1	Cagliari	3	2	1	0	6	2	+4	5
2	Palermo	3	1	1	1	5	5	0	3
3	Catanzaro	3	1	1	1	2	2	0	3
4	Catania	3	0	1	2	3	7	−4	1

Source: rsssf.com

=== Group 3 ===
Pos	Team	Pld	W	D	L	GF	GA	GD	Pts
1	Varese	3	2	1	0	5	2	+3	5
2	Milan	3	1	2	0	6	3	+3	4
3	Hellas Verona	3	1	1	1	5	5	0	3
4	Como	3	0	0	3	5	11	−6	0

Source: rsssf.com

=== Group 4 ===
Pos	Team	Pld	W	D	L	GF	GA	GD	Pts
1	Internazionale	3	2	1	0	4	0	+4	5
2	Genoa	3	1	1	1	3	5	−2	3
3	Pisa	3	1	0	2	3	4	−1	2
4	Sampdoria	3	0	2	1	2	3	−1	2

Source: rsssf.com

=== Group 5 ===
Pos	Team	Pld	W	D	L	GF	GA	GD	Pts
1	Juventus	3	1	2	0	4	2	+2	4
2	Mantova	3	1	2	0	5	4	+1	4
3	Atalanta	3	1	1	1	5	5	0	3
4	Brescia	3	0	1	2	4	7	−3	1

Source: rsssf.com

=== Group 6 ===
Pos	Team	Pld	W	D	L	GF	GA	GD	Pts
1	Torino	3	1	2	0	5	3	+2	4
2	Monza	3	1	2	0	3	2	+1	4
3	Piacenza	3	1	2	0	2	1	+1	4
4	Vicenza	3	0	0	3	2	6	−4	0

Source: rsssf.com

=== Group 7 ===
Pos	Team	Pld	W	D	L	GF	GA	GD	Pts
1	Foggia	3	2	0	1	2	3	−1	4
2	Reggina	3	1	1	1	4	2	+2	3
3	Napoli	3	1	1	1	4	3	+1	3
4	Casertana	3	1	0	2	2	4	−2	2

Source: rsssf.com

=== Group 8 ===
Pos	Team	Pld	W	D	L	GF	GA	GD	Pts
1	Roma	3	2	1	0	4	1	+3	5
2	Perugia	3	1	1	1	2	2	0	3
3	Ternana	3	0	3	0	0	0	0	3
4	Lazio	3	0	1	2	0	3	−3	1

Source: rsssf.com

=== Group 9 ===
Pos	Team	Pld	W	D	L	GF	GA	GD	Pts
1	Bologna	3	3	0	0	8	1	+7	6
2	Cesena	3	1	1	1	2	3	−1	3
3	Modena	3	0	2	1	2	5	−3	2
4	Reggiana	3	0	1	2	2	5	−3	1

Source: rsssf.com

== Qualifying play-off ==
The top seven groupwinners of the nine group qualifier in the quarter-finals. The other two teams played playoff. Foggia, Torino and Juventus won with the lowest points. Italian league decision: Foggia and Juventus plays the Play-off.

Home team	Score	Away team
Juventus	2–1	Foggia

== Quarter-finals ==
Team 1	Agg.	Team 2	1st leg	2nd leg
Roma	0–3	Cagliari	0–1	0–2
Fiorentina	0–0	Varese	0–0	0–0
Internazionale	1–1	Torino	1–0	0–1
Juventus	0–0	Bologna	0–0	0–0

Replay matches

Home team	Score	Away team
Varese	1–0	Fiorentina
Torino	3–2	Internazionale
Bologna	1–0	Juventus

== Final group ==
Pos	Team	Pld	W	D	L	GF	GA	GD	Pts
1	Bologna	6	4	1	1	11	2	+9	9
2	Torino	6	4	0	2	9	6	+3	8
3	Cagliari	6	1	3	2	5	9	−4	5
4	Varese	6	0	2	4	2	10	−8	2

Source: rsssf.com

== Top goalscorers ==
Rank	Player	Club	Goals
1	(Italy) Giuseppe Savoldi	Bologna	6
2	(Italy) Giacomo Bulgarelli	Bologna	5
2	(Italy) Emiliano Mondonico	Torino	5
4	(Italy) Luigi Riva	Cagliari	4
4	(Italy) Mario Brugnera	Cagliari	4
4	(Italy) Mario Maraschi	Fiorentina	4
4	(Italy) Lucio Mujesan	Bologna	4
