= Ugo Ferrante =

Italian footballer and manager

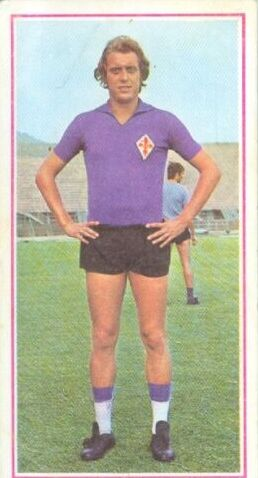
- Ferrante in the 1970–71 A.C. Fiorentina season

Personal information
- Full name: Ugo Ferrante
- Date of birth: 18 July 1945
- Place of birth: Vercelli, Italy
- Date of death: 29 November 2004 (aged 59)
- Place of death: Vercelli, Italy
- Height: 1.88 m (6 ft 2 in)
- Position: Defender

Youth career
- Pro Vercelli

Senior career*
Years	Team	Apps	(Gls)
1963–1972	Fiorentina	179	(6)
1972–1976	Vicenza	84	(1)
Total		263	(7)

International career
1970–1971	Italy	3	(0)
Medal record
Representing Italy
Men's Football
FIFA World Cup
Runner-up	1970 Mexico
- * Club domestic league appearances and goals

Ugo Ferrante (Italian pronunciation: [ˈuːɡo ferˈrante]; 18 July 1945 – 29 November 2004) was an Italian footballer and manager who played as a defender, in the role of sweeper or libero.

== Club career ==
During his club career, Ferrante played for Pro Vercelli, Fiorentina (1963–72), and Vicenza (1972–76). He had a successful career with Fiorentina, winning the Torneo di Viareggio, the Mitropa Cup, and the Coppa Italia in 1966, as well as the 1968–69 Serie A title; he also reached two more Mitropa Cup finals in 1965 and 1972, as well as a Coppa della Alpi Final in 1970 during his time with the club, also playing in the European Cup Winners' Cup, the European Cup, and the Inter-Cities Fairs Cup.

== International career ==
At international level, Ferrante earned 3 caps for the Italy national football team between 1970 and 1971. He was included in the Italian squad for the 1970 FIFA World Cup, although he did not make a single appearance as Italy went on to reach the final of the tournament, only to be defeated by Brazil.

== Death ==
Ferrante died in 2004, at the age of 59, due to a throat tumor.

== Honours ==
=== Club ===
Fiorentina

- Torneo di Viareggio: 1966
- Coppa Italia: 1965–66
- Mitropa Cup: 1966
- Serie A: 1968–69

=== International ===
Italy

- FIFA World Cup (Runner-up): 1970
