= San Canzian d'Isonzo =

- Comune
- Comune di San Canzian d'Isonzo
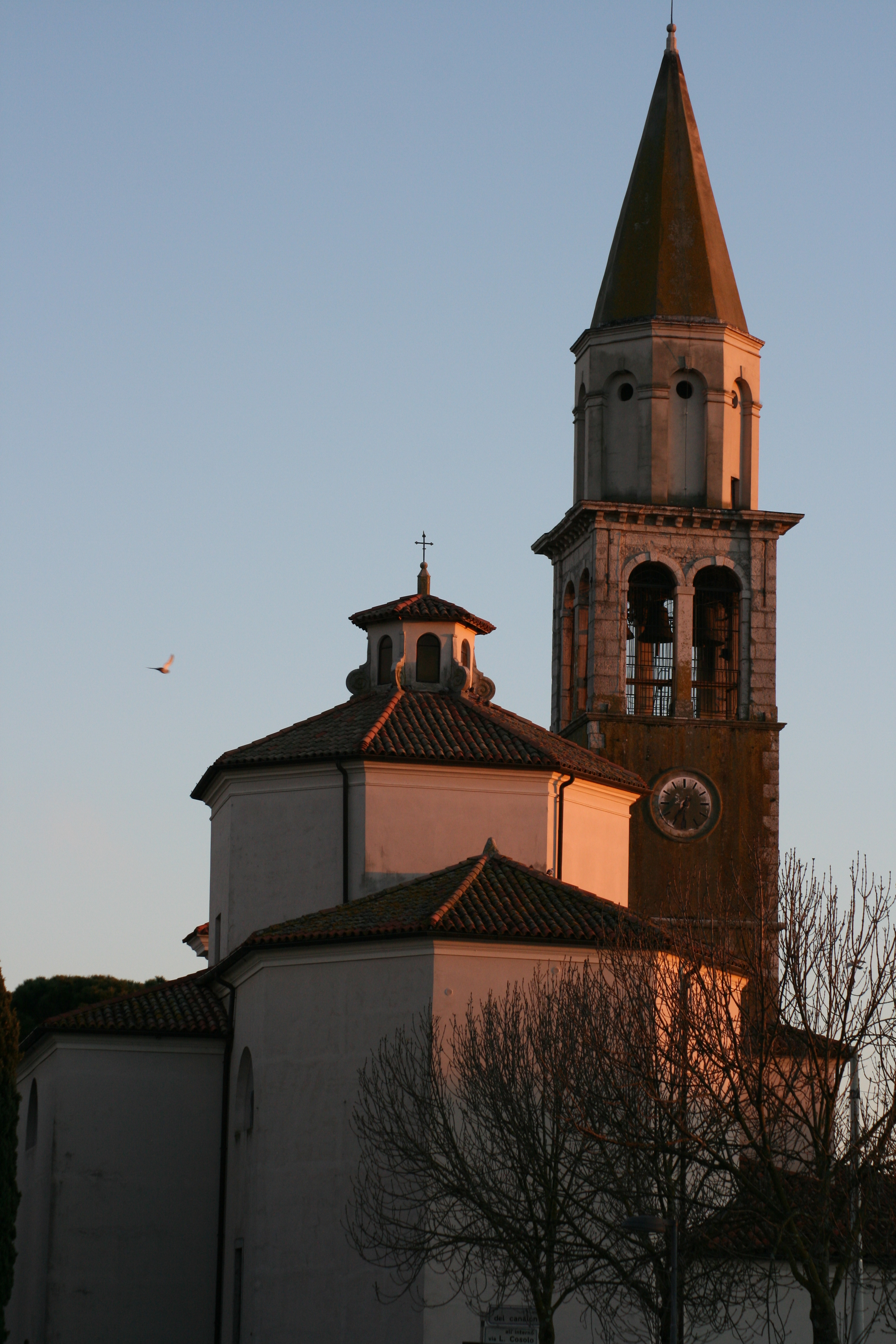

- Coat of arms

- Location within Italy Location within Friuli-Venezia Giulia
- Coordinates: 45°48′N 13°28′E
- Country: Italy
- Region: Friuli-Venezia Giulia
- Province: Gorizia (GO)
- Frazioni: Begliano, Isola Morosini, Pieris, Terranova

Government
  - Mayor: Silvia Caruso (PD)

Area
  - Total: 33.6 km^{2} (13.0 sq mi)
- Elevation: 8 m (26 ft)

Population (2008)
  - Total: 6,394
  - Density: 190/km^{2} (493/sq mi)
- Time zone: UTC+1 (CET)
  - Summer (DST): UTC+2 (CEST)
- Patron saint: Cantius, Cantianus and Cantianilla
- Website: Official website

San Canzian d'Isonzo (Bisiacco: Sacanziàn; Friulian: San Canzian; Slovene: Škocjan ob Soči) is a comune (municipality) in the Regional decentralization entity of Gorizia in Friuli-Venezia Giulia, northeast Italy.

The small town is situated about 30 kilometres (19 mi) from Gorizia, the capital of the province, and west of the important port of Trieste. Its name refers to the martyrs Cantius, Cantianus, and Cantianilla, who are said to have been beheaded here in 304 AD.

It is also the birthplace of Italian footballer and former AC Milan manager Fabio Capello.

== Hamlets ==
- Pieris
- Begliano
- Terranova

== Notable people ==
- Gastone Bean
- Lucio Bertogna, professional footballer
- Fabio Capello, Italian former professional football manager and player
- Mario Tortul
- Tullio Zuppet (1926–1998), professional football player (Atalanta: 1946–49) and top manager of FIAT Auto
