= Franco Superchi =

Italian footballer

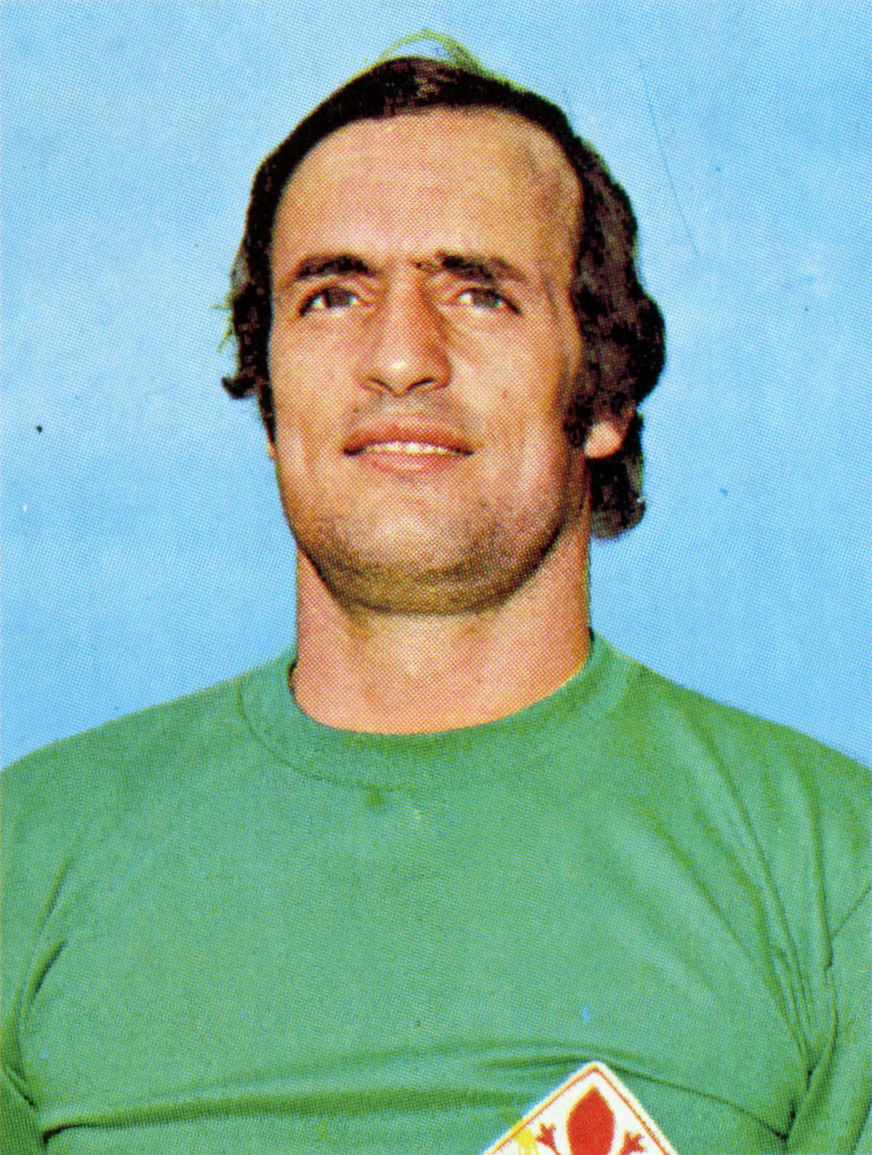
- Superchi with Fiorentina in 1973

Personal information
- Date of birth: 1 September 1944 (age 82)
- Place of birth: Allumiere, Italy
- Height: 1.80 m (5 ft 11 in)
- Position: Goalkeeper

Senior career*
Years	Team	Apps	(Gls)
1963–1965	Tevere Roma	23	(0)
1965–1976	Fiorentina	227	(0)
1976–1980	Verona	126	(0)
1980–1984	Roma	1	(0)
1984–1985	Civitavecchia	21	(0)
- * Club domestic league appearances and goals

Franco Superchi (born 1 September 1944 in Allumiere) is a retired Italian professional footballer who played as a goalkeeper.

== Career ==
After starting his career with Tevere Roma in 1963, where he remained for two years, Superchi played for 13 seasons in the Italian Serie A with ACF Fiorentina, Hellas Verona F.C. and A.S. Roma.

He joined Fiorentina in 1965. During his first three seasons with the club he was the third-choice goalkeeper and did not play any league games in the first two. In his fourth, the 1968–69 season, Fiorentina won the Italian championship, and the impressive performances by the rookie were integral to the team's success. He played seven more seasons for Fiorentina, never equalling the brilliance of the championship season, but always proving to be a reliable shot-stopper. He remained with the team until 1976.

After four seasons with Verona, Superchi later served as Roma's backup goalkeeper for four more seasons in the 1980s, and played only on one occasion, a few minutes as a substitute in the last game of the 1982–83 season, during which Roma won the Serie A title, which was the second Italian championship title of his career. He left the club at the end of the following season, and spent one more season with Civitavecchia before retiring from professional football in 1985.

== Honours ==
Fiorentina

- Serie A champion: 1968–69.
- Coppa Italia winner: 1965–66, 1974–75.
- Mitropa Cup winner: 1965–66.
- Anglo-Italian League Cup winner: 1975–76.

Roma

- Serie A champion: 1982–83.
- Coppa Italia winner: 1980–81, 1983–84.
