= 1966 Torneo di Viareggio =

1966 Torneo Mondiale di Calcio Coppa Carnevale
18° Torneo di Viareggio

Tournament details
- Host country: Italy
- City: Viareggio
- Teams: 16

Final positions
- Champions: (Italy) Fiorentina
- Runners-up: (Czechoslovakia) Dukla Praha
- Third place: (Italy) Milan
- Fourth place: (Italy) Juventus

Tournament statistics
- Matches played: 24
- Goals scored: 58 (2.42 per match)

The 1966 winners of the Torneo di Viareggio (in English, the Viareggio Tournament, officially the Viareggio Cup World Football Tournament Coppa Carnevale), the annual youth football tournament held in Viareggio, Tuscany, are listed below.

== Format ==
The 16 teams are organized in knockout rounds. The round of 16 are played in two-legs, while the rest of the rounds are single tie.

== Participating teams ==
Italian teams

- (Italy) Bologna
- (Italy) Fiorentina
- (Italy) Genoa
- (Italy) Inter Milan
- (Italy) Juventus
- (Italy) Lanerossi Vicenza
- (Italy) Milan
- (Italy) Napoli

European teams

- (Austria) Rapid Wien
- Austria Wien
- (West Germany) Eintracht Frankfurt
- (Czechoslovakia) Dukla Praha
- (Bulgaria) CSKA Sofia
- (Socialist Federal Republic of Yugoslavia) Partizan Beograd
- (West Germany) Augsburg
- (Hungary) Honvéd

== Tournament fixtures ==
First round
(West Germany) Eintracht Frankfurt	0	0	0
(Italy) Fiorentina	2	0	2
(Italy) Lanerossi Vicenza	1	4	5
(Socialist Federal Republic of Yugoslavia) Partizan Beograd	2	4	6
Austria Wien	0	0	0
(Italy) Milan	2	3	5
(Italy) Genoa	0	2	2
(Hungary) Honvéd	0	3	3
(Czechoslovakia) Dukla Praha(pen)	1	1	2 [6]
(Italy) Napoli	0	2	2 [4]
(Italy) Inter(pen)	0	1	1 [6]
(Austria) Rapid Wien	0	1	1 [3]
(West Germany) Augsburg	0	0	0
(Italy) Juventus	0	6	6
(Italy) Bologna	2	0	2
(Bulgaria) CSKA Sofia	2	1	3

Quarter-finals
(Italy) Fiorentina(aet)	2
(Socialist Federal Republic of Yugoslavia) Partizan Beograd	1
(Italy) Milan(pen)	0 [7]
(Hungary) Honvéd	0 [6]
(Czechoslovakia) Dukla Praha	3
(Italy) Inter	1
(Italy) Juventus	2
(Bulgaria) CSKA Sofia	1

Semi-finals
(Italy) Fiorentina(aet)	2
(Italy) Milan	1
(Czechoslovakia) Dukla Praha(pen)	1 [?]
(Italy) Juventus	1 [?]

Final
(Italy) Fiorentina	2
(Czechoslovakia) Dukla Praha	0
Third place
(Italy) Milan	1
(Italy) Juventus	0

== Champions ==
Torneo di Viareggio 1966 champions
Fiorentina
1st title
