= Ezio Sella =

Italian footballer (born 1956)

Personal information
- Date of birth: 11 April 1956 (age 70)
- Place of birth: Rome, Italy
- Position: Striker

Team information
- Current team: Bologna (assistant coach)

Senior career*
Years	Team	Apps	(Gls)
1976–1977	Viterbese	30	(6)
1977–1980	Fiorentina	67	(19)
1980–1981	Brescia	20	(3)
1981–1982	Sampdoria	23	(1)
1982–1983	Verona	13	(0)
1983	Bologna	4	(0)
1983–1984	Arezzo	35	(6)
1984–1987	Ancona	87	(16)
1987–1988	Civitavecchia	21	(8)
1988–1989	Lodigiani	25	(1)

Managerial career
- 1996: Roma
- 2001: Palermo
- * Club domestic league appearances and goals

Ezio Sella (born 11 April 1956) is an Italian football coach and former professional player.

During his playing career he played for Viterbese, Fiorentina, Brescia, Sampdoria, Verona, Bologna, Arezzo, Ancona, Civitavecchia and Lodigiani. After retiring from playing in 1989 he has managed Roma and Palermo, guiding the rosanero to win the Serie C1 title during his two-week time in Sicily.

In November 2009 he joined Siena as assistant of newly appointed boss Alberto Malesani. He successively followed Malesani also at Bologna.
