= Giovan Battista Pirovano =

Italian footballer

Personal information
- Date of birth: 5 May 1937
- Place of birth: Vercelli, Italy
- Date of death: 8 November 2014 (aged 77)
- Place of death: Vercelli, Italy
- Height: 1.76 m (5 ft 9 1/2 in)
- Position: Midfielder

Senior career*
Years	Team	Apps	(Gls)
1958–1961	Pro Vercelli	84	(2)
1961–1963	Verona	73	(12)
1963–1970	Fiorentina	145	(11)
1970–1971	Legnano	18	(0)
1971–1972	Pro Vercelli		
Total		320	(25)

International career
1966	Italy	1	(0)
- * Club domestic league appearances and goals

Giovan Battista Pirovano (Italian pronunciation: [dʒoˈvam batˈtista piˈrɔːvano]; 5 May 1937 – 8 November 2014) was an Italian footballer who played at both professional and international levels as a midfielder.

== Career ==
Born in Vercelli, Pirovano played for Pro Vercelli, Verona, Fiorentina and Legnano.

With Fiorentina he won the 1966 Italian Cup and the 1969 league championship.

He made one international appearance for Italy, in 1966.

== Later life and death ==
He died on 8 November 2014, aged 77.
