= Claudio Merlo =

Italian footballer and coach (born 1946)

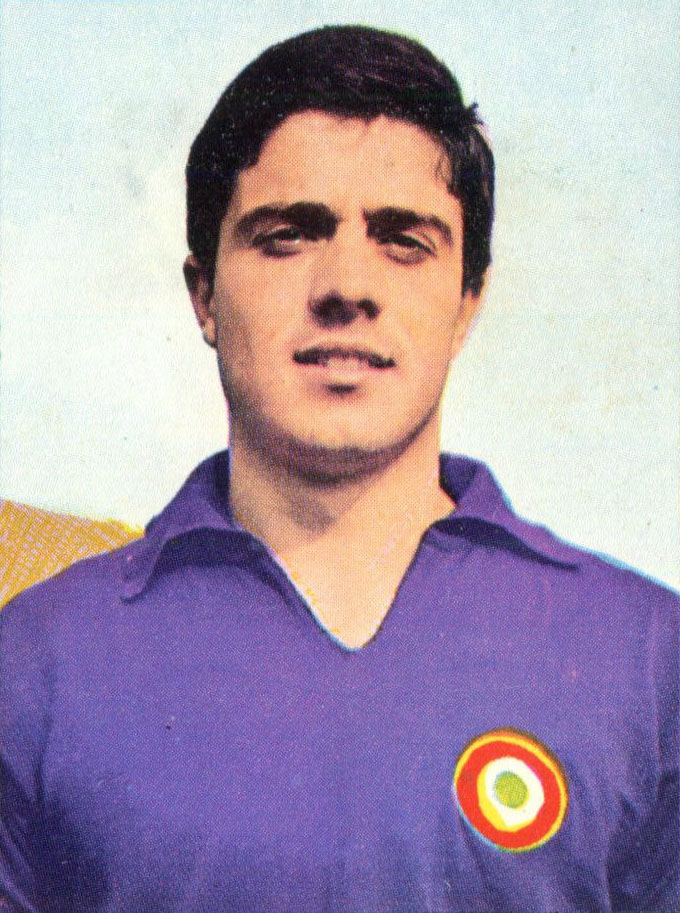

Personal information
- Date of birth: 7 July 1946 (age 80)
- Place of birth: Rome, Italy
- Height: 1.76 m (5 ft 9 1/2 in)
- Position: Midfielder

Senior career*
Years	Team	Apps	(Gls)
1965–1976	Fiorentina	257	(19)
1976–1978	Internazionale	38	(0)
1978–1982	Lecce	56	(3)

International career
1969	Italy	1	(0)

Managerial career
- 1986–1987: Rondinella
- 1988–1989: Sorso
- * Club domestic league appearances and goals

Claudio Merlo (Italian pronunciation: [ˈklaudjo ˈmɛrlo]; born 7 July 1946) is an Italian professional football coach and a former player, who played as a midfielder.

== Club career ==
Merlo twice won the Coppa Italia in 1966 and 1975 with Fiorentina, and finished as a runner-up in the tournament in 1977 with Inter. He also helped Fiorentina to the Serie A title during the 1968–69 season, playing 26 of 30 matches.

== International career ==
Merlo earned one cap for Italy, playing at the Azteca Stadium in Mexico City against Mexico on 5 January 1969.

== Honours ==
Fiorentina

- Serie A champion: 1968–69.
- Coppa Italia winner: 1965–66.
- Mitropa Cup winner: 1966.

Inter

- Coppa Italia winner: 1977–78.
