= Salvatore Esposito (footballer, born 1948) =

Italian footballer and manager

Personal information
- Date of birth: 3 January 1948 (age 78)
- Place of birth: Torre Annunziata, Italy
- Position: Midfielder

Senior career*
Years	Team	Apps	(Gls)
1966–72	Fiorentina	109	(2)
1972–77	Napoli	128	(6)
1977–79	Hellas Verona	34	(0)
1979–81	Fano	59	(1)
1981–82	Siena	28	(1)
1982–84	Empoli	61	(4)

International career
1975	Italy	1	(0)

Managerial career
- 1991: Siena
- 1997–98: Ascoli
- 1999: Catanzaro
- * Club domestic league appearances and goals

Salvatore Esposito (Italian pronunciation: [salvaˈtoːre eˈspɔːzito]; born 3 January 1948) is an Italian former footballer from Torre Annunziata in the Province of Naples. He played as a midfielder for several clubs during his footballing career, most notably Napoli and Fiorentina.

As well as playing for many years at club level, Esposito was also called up for one appearance by the Italy national football team. His only international call-up and appearance came on 8 June 1975.

== Honours ==
Fiorentina

- Serie A: 1968–69

Napoli

- Coppa Italia: 1975–76

Individual

- ACF Fiorentina Hall of Fame: 2023
