= Giorgio Mariani =

Italian footballer

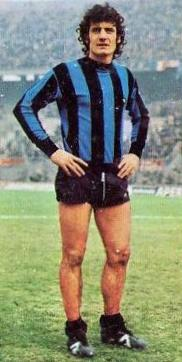
- Mariani in 1974–75 for Inter Milan

Personal information
- Date of birth: 6 April 1946
- Place of birth: Sassuolo, Italy
- Date of death: 8 December 2011 (aged 65)
- Height: 1.74 m (5 ft 8 1/2 in)
- Positions: Midfielder; striker

Senior career*
Years	Team	Apps	(Gls)
1964–1965	Fiorentina	0	(0)
1965–1966	Modena	1	(0)
1966–1967	Cosenza	24	(4)
1967–1968	Del Duca Ascoli	28	(7)
1968–1971	Fiorentina	38	(3)
1971–1972	Verona	27	(6)
1972–1973	Napoli	24	(3)
1973	Palermo	3	(0)
1973–1975	Internazionale	39	(8)
1975–1977	Cesena	30	(1)
1977–1978	Varese	25	(2)
- * Club domestic league appearances and goals

Giorgio Mariani (6 April 1946 – 8 December 2011) was an Italian professional footballer who played as a forward or midfielder.

== Honours ==
Fiorentina

- Serie A champion: 1968–69.
