= Paolo Signorelli (footballer) =

Italian footballer

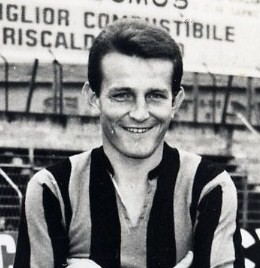

Personal information
- Date of birth: 10 March 1939
- Date of death: 3 May 2018 (aged 79)
- Position: Midfielder

Senior career*
| Years | Team | Apps | (Gls) |
| 1959–1960 | Trevigliese | | |
| 1960–1965 | Pro Patria | | |
| 1965–1970 | Atalanta | | |
- * Club domestic league appearances and goals

Paolo Signorelli (10 March 1939 – 3 May 2018) was an Italian professional footballer who played for Trevigliese, Pro Patria and Atalanta, as a midfielder.
