= Francesco Rizzo (footballer) =

Italian footballer (1943–2022)

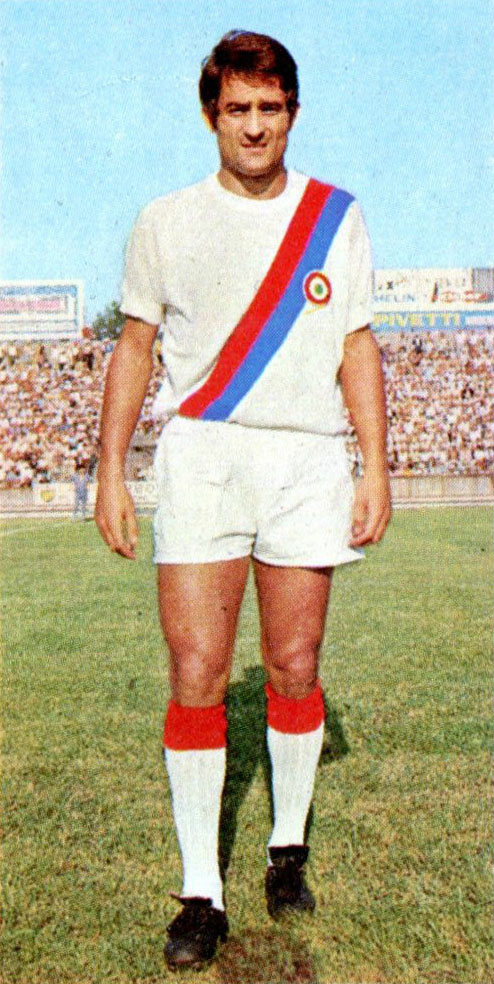
- Rizzo with Bologna in 1970

Personal information
- Date of birth: 30 May 1943
- Place of birth: Rovito, Italy
- Date of death: 17 July 2022 (aged 79)
- Height: 1.73 m (5 ft 8 in)
- Position: Midfielder

Youth career
- 1959–1960: Cosenza

Senior career*
| Years | Team | Apps | (Gls) |
| 1960–1961 | Cosenza | | |
| 1961 | AC Milan | | |
| 1961–1962 | Alessandria | | |
| 1962–1968 | Cagliari | | |
| 1968–1970 | Fiorentina | 47 | (8) |
| 1970–1972 | Bologna | 53 | (4) |
| 1972–1974 | Catanzaro | | |
| 1974 | Cesena | | |
| 1974–1979 | Genoa | | |

International career
| 1966 | Italy | 2 | (2) |
- * Club domestic league appearances and goals

Francesco Rizzo (Italian pronunciation: [franˈtʃesko ˈrittso]; 30 May 1943 – 17 July 2022) was an Italian footballer who played as a midfielder.

== Club career ==
Born in Rovito, in the province of Cosenza, Rizzo began playing football with Cosenza. After spells with Milan and Alessandria, he joined Cagliari, where he made his Serie A debut against Fiorentina on 29 November 1964.

During his club career he played for Cosenza, Alessandria, Cagliari, Fiorentina, Bologna, Catanzaro, Cesena and Genoa.

== International career ==
At the international level, Rizzo earned two caps and scored two goals for the Italy national team in 1966, and was part of the Italian squad for the 1966 FIFA World Cup.
