= Sergio Clerici =

Brazilian footballer

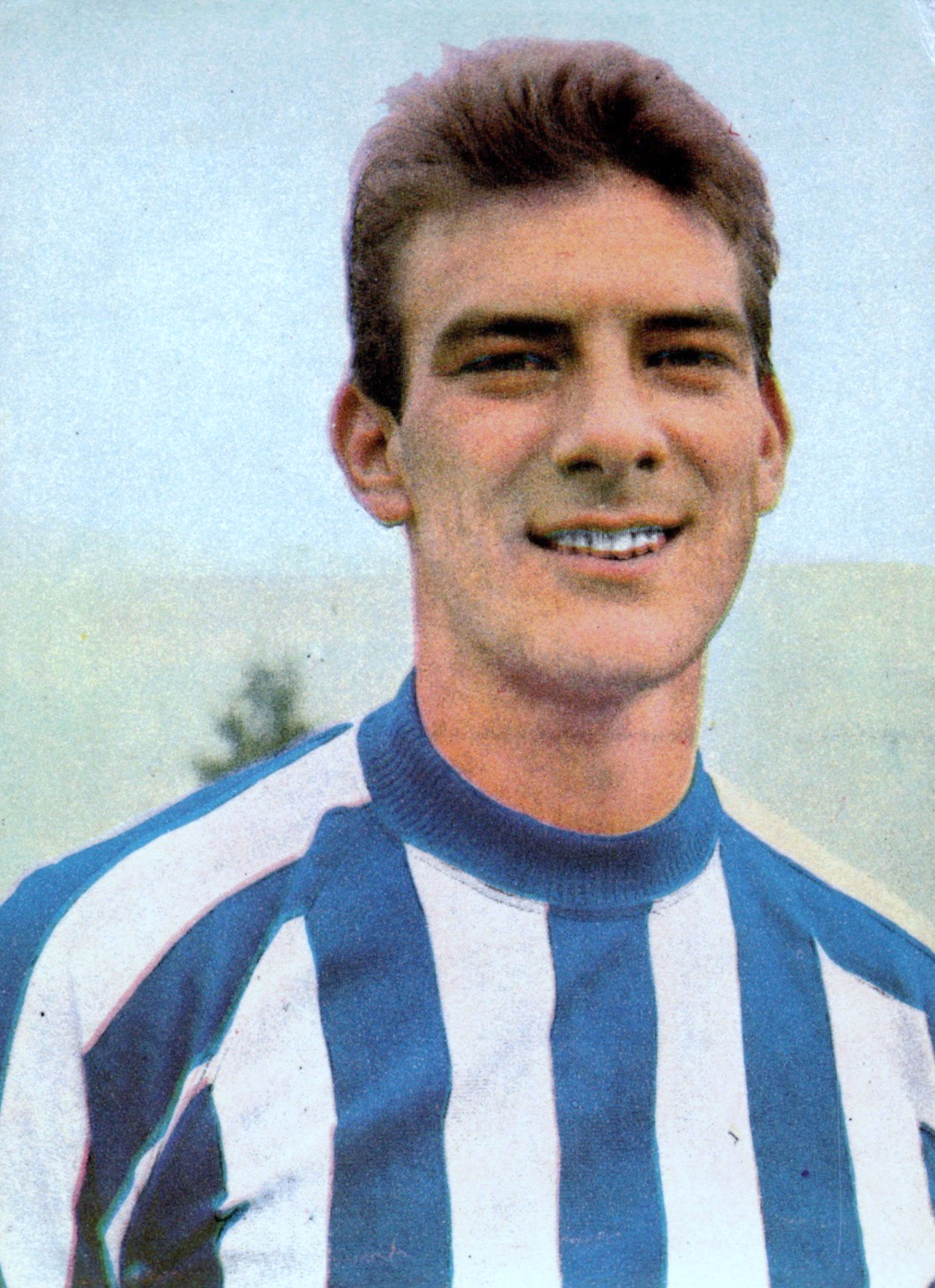
- Clerici with Lecco in 1966

Personal information
- Date of birth: 25 May 1941 (age 85)
- Place of birth: São Paulo, Brazil
- Position: Striker

Youth career
- 1958–1960: Portuguesa

Senior career*
Years	Team	Apps	(Gls)
1960–1967	Lecco	201	(59)
1967–1968	Bologna	22	(4)
1968–1969	Atalanta	26	(9)
1969–1971	Verona	54	(18)
1971–1973	Fiorentina	52	(20)
1973–1975	Napoli	57	(29)
1975–1977	Bologna	53	(15)
1977–1978	Lazio	11	(1)
1978	Montreal Castors		

Managerial career
- 1980: Palmeiras
- 1980: Inter de Limeira
- 1981: Santos
- 1981–1982: Inter de Limeira
- 1983: Inter de Limeira
- * Club domestic league appearances and goals

Sergio Clerici (born 25 May 1941) is a Brazilian retired football player and coach.

== Career ==
Born in São Paulo, Clerici played as a forward in Italy for Lecco, Bologna, Atalanta, Verona, Fiorentina, Napoli and Lazio.

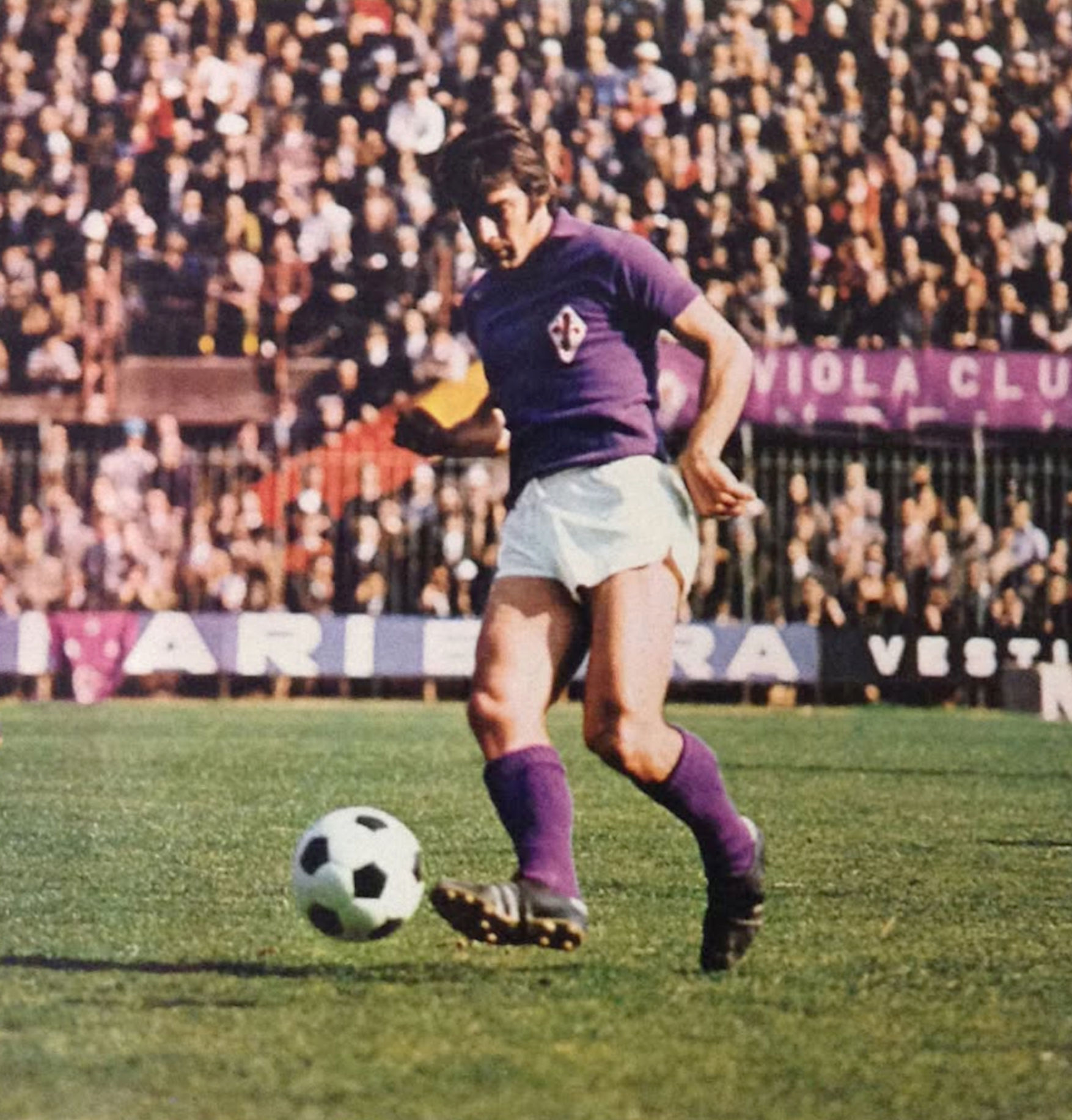
Clerici playing for Fiorentina in 1972

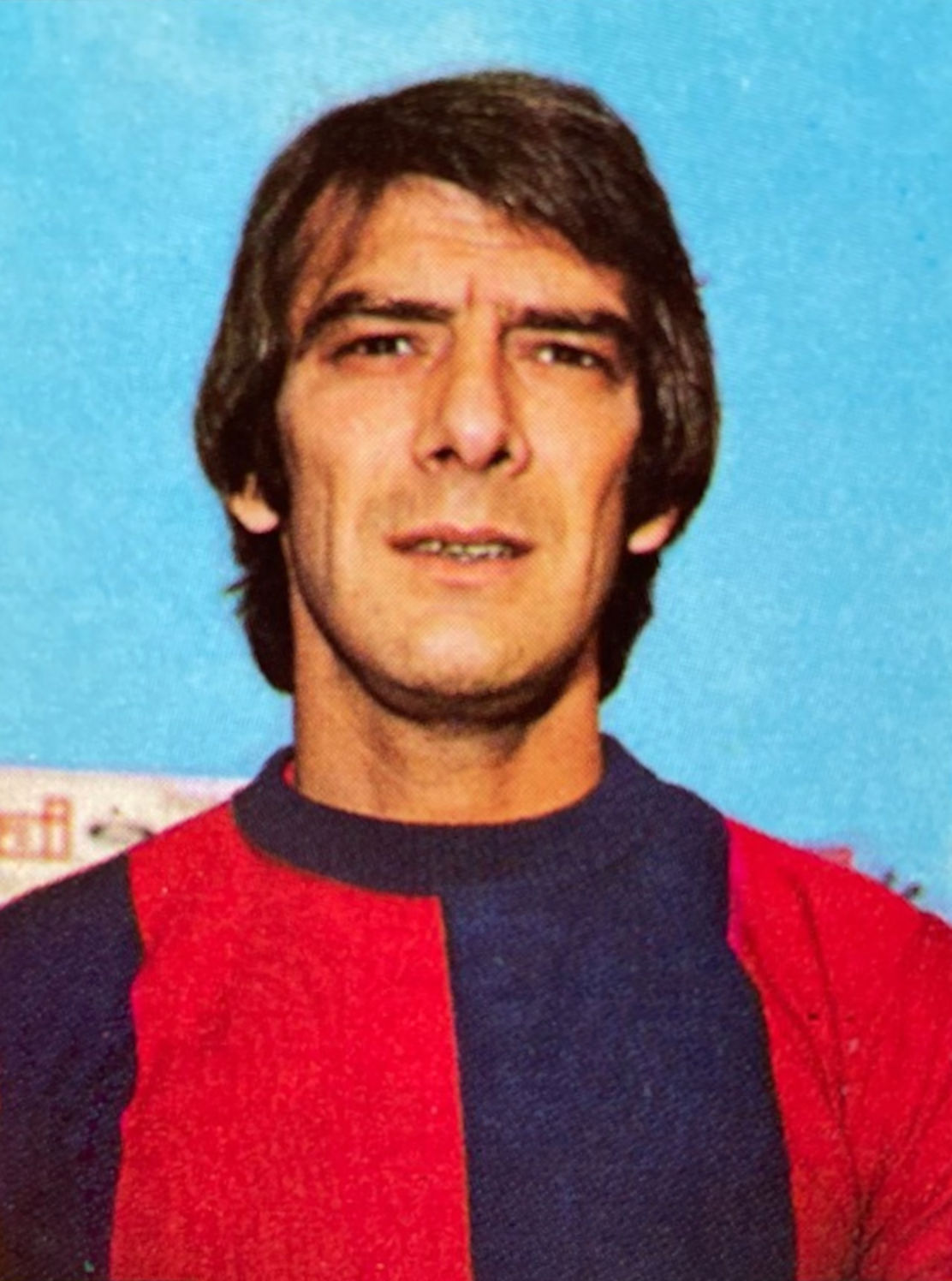
Clerici with Bologna in 1975

In 1978, he played in the National Soccer League with Montreal Castors.
