= Lucio Bertogna =

Italian footballer

Personal information
- Date of birth: February 25, 1946 (age 80)
- Place of birth: San Canzian d'Isonzo, Italy
- Height: 1.68 m (5 ft 6 in)
- Position: Midfielder

Senior career*
Years	Team	Apps	(Gls)
1964–1968	Venezia	111	(12)
1968	Fiorentina	0	(0)
1969	Roma	3	(0)
1969–1973	Monza	129	(16)
1973–1976	Trento	97	(9)
- * Club domestic league appearances and goals

Lucio Bertogna (born 25 February 1946 in San Canzian d'Isonzo) is a retired Italian professional football player. He played for 2 seasons (30 games, 1 goal) in the Serie A for S.S.C. Venezia and A.S. Roma.

== Honours ==
- Serie A champion: 1968/69 (on the roster for ACF Fiorentina, but did not play any league games).
- Coppa Italia winner: 1968/69.
