= Bruno Pesaola =

Italian footballer and manager (1925-2015)

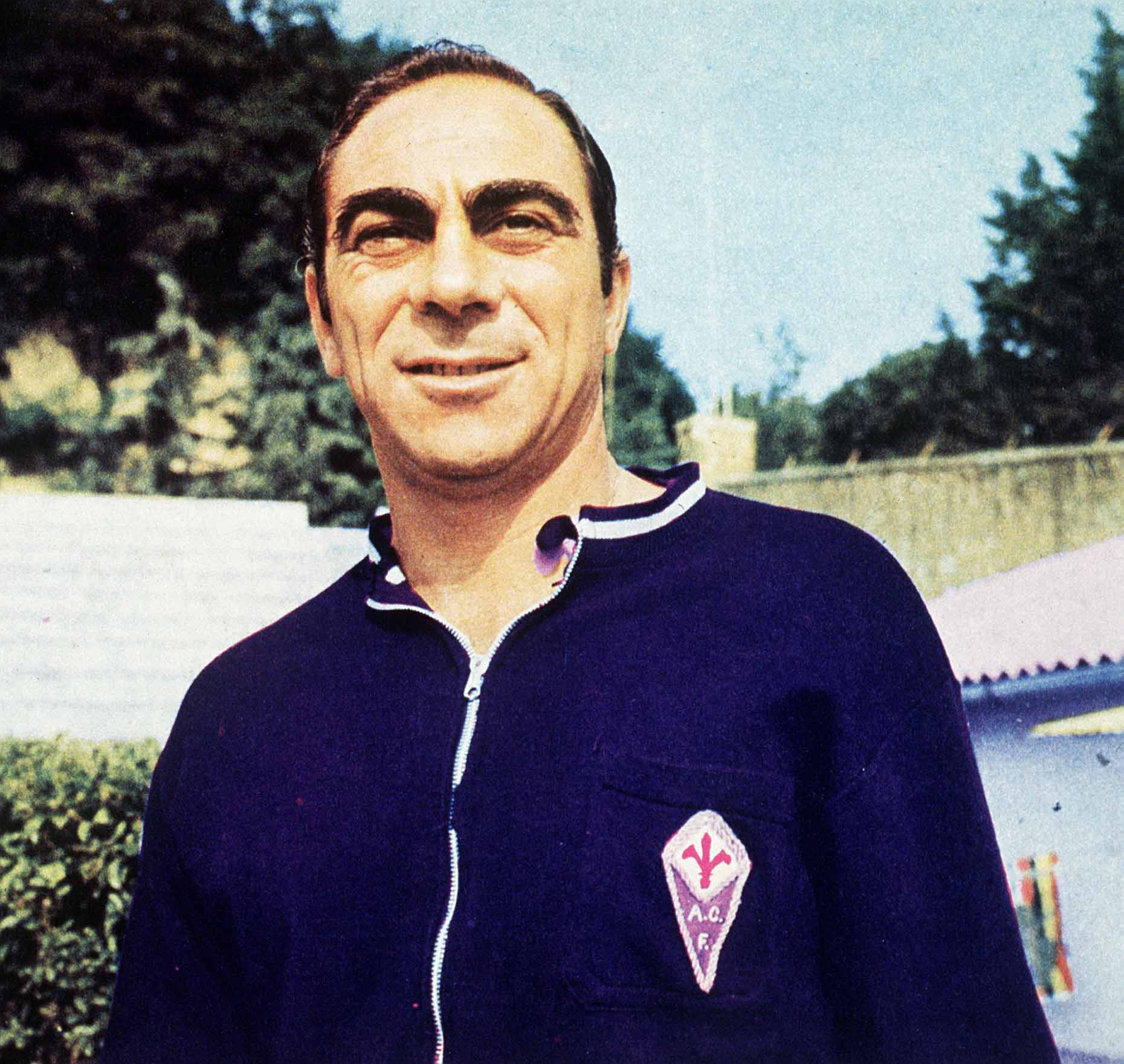
- Pesaola as Fiorentina manager between 1960s and 1970s

Personal information
- Date of birth: 28 July 1925
- Place of birth: Buenos Aires, Argentina
- Date of death: 29 May 2015 (aged 89)
- Place of death: Naples, Italy
- Height: 1.65 m (5 ft 5 in)
- Position: Left winger

Youth career
- 1939–1944: River Plate

Senior career*
Years	Team	Apps	(Gls)
1945–1946	Dock Sud		
1947–1950	Roma	90	(20)
1950–1952	Novara	64	(15)
1952–1960	Napoli	240	(27)
1960–1961	Genoa	20	(5)
1961–1962	Scafatese		

International career
1953	Italy B	1	(0)
1957	Italy	1	(0)

Managerial career
- 1962–1968: Napoli
- 1968–1971: Fiorentina
- 1972–1976: Bologna
- 1976–1977: Napoli
- 1977–1979: Bologna
- 1979–1980: Panathinaikos
- 1980–1981: Siracusa
- 1982–1983: Napoli
- 1983–1985: Puteolana
- * Club domestic league appearances and goals

Bruno Pesaola (Italian pronunciation: [ˈbruːno peˈzaːola]; 28 July 1925 – 29 May 2015) was a professional football player and manager, who played as a winger. He is most famous for his time with Italian clubs Fiorentina and S.S.C. Napoli, as both a player and a manager. Even though he was not born in Italy, he played for the Italy national team.

He was nicknamed Petisso (little man).
