= Lucio Mujesan =

Italian footballer and manager

Personal information
- Date of birth: 11 January 1943 (age 83)
- Place of birth: Piran, Italy
- Height: 1.81 m (5 ft 11 1/2 in)
- Position: Striker

Senior career*
Years	Team	Apps	(Gls)
1961–1962	Roma	0	(0)
1962–1963	Messina	11	(3)
1963–1964	Venezia	28	(4)
1964–1966	Avellino	61	(32)
1966–1968	Bari	71	(37)
1968–1970	Bologna	52	(18)
1970–1971	Verona	9	(0)
1971–1972	Bari	15	(2)
1972–1973	Roma	12	(3)
1973–1976	Arezzo	70	(26)
1976–1978	Salernitana	50	(19)

Managerial career
- 1977: Salernitana
- 1978: Salernitana
- 1981–1982: Paganese
- 1982–1983: Cosenza
- 1984–1985: Akragas
- * Club domestic league appearances and goals

Lucio Mujesan (born 11 January 1943) is an Italian former footballer who scored 146 goals from 379 appearances in the Italian professional leagues. He played for 4 seasons (73 games, 21 goals) in Serie A for Bologna, Hellas Verona and Roma. He was born in Piran, which was in Italy but is now part of Slovenia.

== Honours ==
- Coppa Italia winner: 1969/70.
- Top scorer of Coppa Italia: 1967/68 (6 goals).
- Top scorer of Serie B: 1967/68 (19 goals).
