= Mario Maraschi =

Italian footballer (1939–2020)

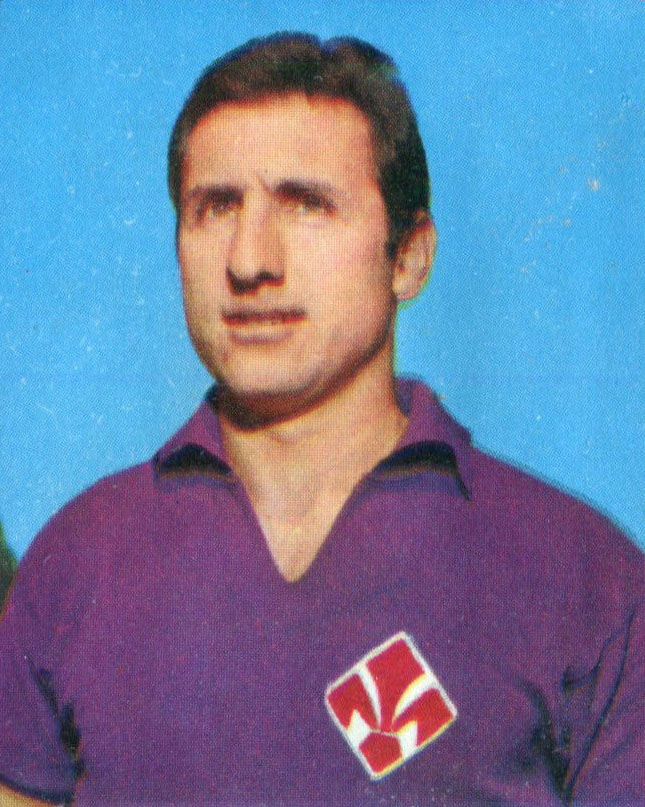
- Maraschi with Fiorentina in the 1967–68 season

Personal information
- Date of birth: 28 August 1939
- Place of birth: Lodi, Italy
- Date of death: 3 December 2020 (aged 81)
- Place of death: Arcugnano
- Height: 1.72 m (5 ft 8 in)
- Position: Striker

Youth career
- Fanfulla

Senior career*
Years	Team	Apps	(Gls)
1956–1958	Fanfulla	22	(8)
1958–1960	Pro Vercelli	51	(8)
1960–1961	Milan	13	(2)
1961–1964	Lazio	75	(14)
1964–1965	Bologna	17	(1)
1965–1967	Lanerossi Vicenza	59	(13)
1967–1970	Fiorentina	79	(31)
1970–1972	Lanerossi Vicenza	54	(19)
1972–1973	Cagliari	13	(3)
1973–1976	Sampdoria	57	(14)
1976–1977	Trento	28	(11)
1977–1978	Legnago	19	(9)

Managerial career
- Legnago
- Arzignano
- 1994–1995: Chiasso
- * Club domestic league appearances and goals

Mario Maraschi (28 August 1939 – 3 December 2020) was an Italian professional football player and manager who played as a striker.

In 2018, he was inducted into ACF Fiorentina Hall of Fame.

== Career ==
In his youth, Maraschi played for Fanfulla, with which he also debuted in the 1956–57 IV Serie season.

After two seasons at Pro Vercelli, he was bought by Milan, where he made his debut in Serie A.

After brief spells at Lazio, Bologna, and Lanerossi Vicenza, he moved to Fiorentina in 1967. Here, he contributed to winning the 1968–69 Serie A, scoring 14 goals.

In 1969, he debuted in a European competition, playing in the 1969–70 European Cup against Östers IF and scoring the winning goal.

== Honours ==
=== Player ===
Fiorentina

- Serie A: 1968–69

=== Individual ===
- ACF Fiorentina Hall of Fame: 2018
