= 1968–69 Serie A =

66th season of top-tier Italian football

Serie A
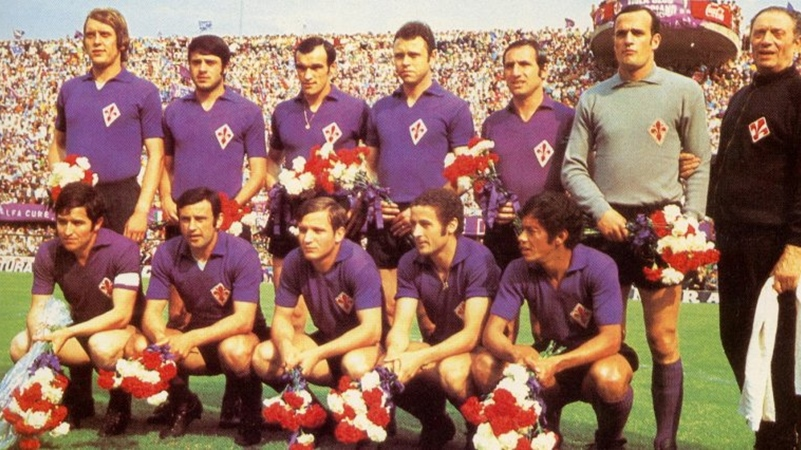
- 1968–69 Fiorentina team
- Season: 1968–69
- Dates: 29 September 1968 – 18 May 1969
- Champions: Fiorentina; 2nd title
- Relegated: Varese; Pisa; Atalanta
- European Cup: Fiorentina; Milan
- Cup Winners' Cup: Roma
- Inter-Cities Fairs Cup: Cagliari; Internazionale; Juventus; Napoli
- Matches: 240
- Goals: 497 (2.07 per match)
- Top goalscorer: Gigi Riva (20 goals)

Serie A 1968-69 team distribution

The 1968–69 Serie A season was won by Fiorentina.

== Teams ==
Palermo, Hellas Verona and Pisa had been promoted from Serie B.

== Events ==
The goal difference was introduced for the relegations instead of the tiebreakers.

== Final classification ==
Pos	Team	Pld	W	D	L	GF	GA	GD	Pts	Qualification or relegation
1	Fiorentina (C)	30	16	13	1	38	18	+20	45	Qualification to European Cup
2	Cagliari	30	14	13	3	41	18	+23	41	Qualified to Inter-Cities Fairs Cup
3	Milan	30	14	13	3	31	12	+19	41	Qualification to European Cup (Note: Qualified as defending champions.)
4	Internazionale	30	14	8	8	55	26	+29	36	Qualified to Inter-Cities Fairs Cup
5	Juventus	30	12	11	7	32	24	+8	35	Qualified to Inter-Cities Fairs Cup
6	Torino	30	11	11	8	33	24	+9	33	(Note: Torino not qualified to the ICFC consequently to Juventus qualification.)
7	Napoli	30	10	12	8	26	25	+1	32	Qualified to Inter-Cities Fairs Cup
8	Roma	30	10	10	10	35	35	0	30	Qualification to Cup Winners' Cup
9	Bologna	30	10	9	11	27	36	−9	29	
10	Hellas Verona	30	9	8	13	40	49	−9	26	
11	Palermo	30	7	11	12	21	32	−11	25	
12	Sampdoria	30	5	13	12	21	27	−6	23	
13	Vicenza	30	8	7	15	26	39	−13	23	
14	Varese (R)	30	5	12	13	20	43	−23	22	Relegation to Serie B
15	Pisa (R)	30	6	8	16	26	44	−18	20	Relegation to Serie B
16	Atalanta (R)	30	4	11	15	25	45	−20	19	Relegation to Serie B

Source: Panini
(C) Champions; (R) Relegated

== Results ==
Home \ Away	ATA	BOL	CAG	FIO	INT	JUV	LRV	MIL	NAP	PAL	PIS	ROM	SAM	TOR	VAR	HEL
Atalanta		1–0	1–2	0–1	0–4	3–3	1–3	0–0	0–0	2–2	1–1	0–2	0–0	3–1	0–0	5–2
Bologna	1–0		2–2	0–0	1–2	1–1	3–0	1–0	2–1	2–0	1–0	0–0	0–0	2–0	1–0	1–1
Cagliari	1–0	3–1		1–1	1–0	0–1	3–0	3–1	0–0	3–0	3–0	0–0	0–0	1–0	0–0	2–0
Fiorentina	2–1	1–3	1–1		1–0	2–1	3–0	0–0	2–1	1–0	3–1	0–0	1–0	0–0	3–1	1–0
Internazionale	1–1	4–0	4–0	1–2		1–2	1–0	1–1	1–1	0–0	4–0	3–1	1–1	2–2	6–0	4–1
Juventus	1–0	1–0	1–2	0–2	1–0		1–0	0–1	2–0	0–0	2–0	2–2	1–1	0–0	2–0	1–0
Vicenza	1–0	1–0	1–1	0–0	0–1	0–0		1–1	2–0	1–0	1–2	1–2	3–0	1–1	1–0	2–1
Milan	0–0	4–0	0–0	0–0	1–0	1–0	4–1		0–0	1–0	2–1	1–0	1–0	1–0	2–0	3–0
Napoli	2–0	1–1	2–1	1–3	3–1	2–1	1–0	0–0		1–0	2–1	0–0	0–3	0–0	1–1	1–1
Palermo	5–1	2–0	0–0	0–0	1–1	1–1	2–1	0–0	0–2		1–0	0–3	1–0	1–0	1–1	0–0
Pisa	1–0	0–1	0–0	0–1	1–1	0–0	2–2	0–1	1–0	4–1		1–2	1–0	1–1	1–1	1–1
Roma	4–1	2–1	1–4	1–2	0–3	1–1	5–2	1–1	0–0	2–1	2–0		1–0	1–3	0–0	1–2
Sampdoria	0–0	0–0	0–1	1–1	0–3	1–1	1–0	1–1	0–2	0–1	1–2	0–0		1–1	4–0	3–2
Torino	3–1	3–0	0–0	0–0	2–1	1–2	0–0	1–0	0–0	3–1	1–0	2–0	2–0		2–1	4–0
Varese	1–2	1–1	1–6	2–2	0–1	0–2	1–0	0–0	1–2	0–0	3–1	2–1	0–0	1–0		1–0
Hellas Verona	1–1	5–1	0–0	2–2	2–3	2–1	2–1	1–3	1–0	2–0	5–3	2–0	0–3	3–0	1–1	

Source: Almanacco Illustrato del Calcio - La Storia 1898-2004, Panini Edizioni, Modena, September 2005 (in Italian)
Legend: Blue = home team win; Yellow = draw; Red = away team win.

== Top goalscorers ==
Rank	Player	Club	Goals
1	(Italy) Gigi Riva	Cagliari	21
2	(Italy) Pietro Anastasi	Juventus	15
2	(Italy) Gianni Bui	Hellas Verona	15
4	(Italy) Pierino Prati	Milan	14
4	(Italy) Mario Maraschi	Fiorentina	14
6	(Italy) Mario Bertini	Internazionale	11
6	(Italy) Lucio Mujesan	Bologna	11
8	(Italy) Sergio Pellizzaro	Palermo	10
9	(Italy) Roberto Boninsegna	Cagliari	9
9	(Italy) Giuseppe Savoldi	Bologna	9
9	(Brazil) Sergio Clerici	Atalanta	9
9	(Italy) Angelo Domenghini	Internazionale	9
13	(Italy) Vincenzo Traspedini	Hellas Verona	8

== Attendances ==
#	Club	Average
1	Napoli	67,079
2	Milan	48,403
3	Roma	46,323
4	Internazionale	39,549
5	Fiorentina	33,637
6	Juventus	33,383
7	Torino	25,435
8	Hellas Verona	23,894
9	Bologna	22,201
10	Cagliari	22,163
11	Palermo	20,561
12	Sampdoria	17,680
13	Atalanta	15,780
14	Pisa	15,488
15	Vicenza	13,539
16	Varese	9,439

== References and sources ==
- Almanacco Illustrato del Calcio - La Storia 1898-2004, Panini Edizioni, Modena, September 2005
