= 1955–56 AC Fiorentina season =

Associazione Calcio Fiorentina
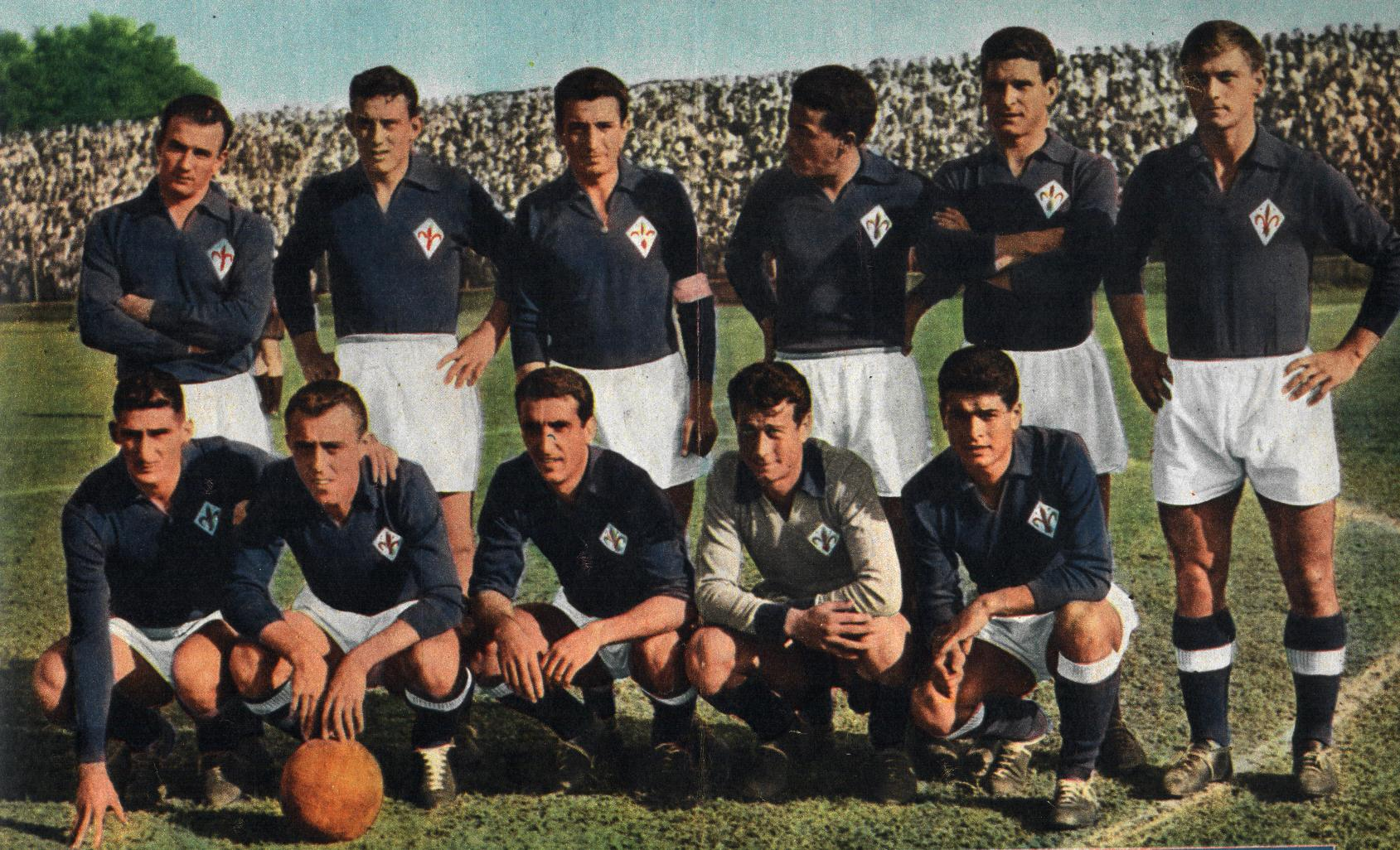
- Chairman: Enrico Befani
- Manager: Fulvio Bernardini
- Stadium: Comunale
- Serie A: 1st in (European Cup)
- Top goalscorer: Virgili (21)
Home colours	Away colours

During 1955–56 Associazione Calcio Fiorentina competed in Serie A.

== Summary ==
1956 was the year of first Scudetto for the Fiorentina. The team started to achieve consistent top-five finishes in the domestic league, consisted of great players such as well-known goalkeeper Giuliano Sarti, Sergio Cervato, Francesco Rosella, Guido Gratton, Giuseppe Chiappella and Aldo Scaramucci but above all, the attacking of Brazilian Julinho Argentinian Miguel Montuori and young striker Giuseppe Virgili . This team won Fiorentina's first scudetto (Italian championship) in 1955–56, 12 points ahead of second-place Milan.

== Squad ==
Note: Flags indicate national team as defined under FIFA eligibility rules; some limited exceptions apply. Players may hold more than one non-FIFA nationality.

Pos.	Nation	Player
GK	ITA	Giuliano Sarti
GK	ITA	Riccardo Toros
DF	ITA	Giampiero Bartoli
DF	ITA	Sergio Cervato
DF	ITA	Ardico Magnini
DF	ITA	Francesco Rosetta
MF	ITA	Sergio Carpanesi
MF	ITA	Giuseppe Chiappella
MF	ITA	Guido Gratton

Pos.	Nation	Player
MF	ITA	Bruno Mazza
MF	ITA	Alberto Orzan
MF	ITA	Maurilio Prini
MF	ITA	Aldo Scaramucci
MF	ITA	Armando Segato
FW	ITA	Claudio Bizzarri
FW	BRA	Julinho
FW	ARG	Miguel Montuori
FW	ITA	Giuseppe Virgili

== Competitions ==
=== Serie A ===
==== League table ====
Pos	Team	Pld	W	D	L	GF	GA	GD	Pts	Qualification or relegation
1	Fiorentina (C)	34	20	13	1	59	20	+39	53	Qualification for the European Cup preliminary round
2	Milan	34	16	9	9	70	48	+22	41	Qualified for the 1956 Latin Cup
3	Internazionale	34	16	7	11	57	36	+21	39	
3	Lazio	34	14	11	9	54	46	+8	39	
5	Bologna	34	15	7	12	68	52	+16	37	

Source: Panini
(C) Champions

==== Results by round ====
Round	1	2	3	4	5	6	7	8	9	10	11	12	13	14	15	16	17	18	19	20	21	22	23	24	25	26	27	28	29	30	31	32	33	34
Ground	A	H	A	H	A	H	A	H	A	A	H	H	A	H	H	A	H	H	A	H	A	H	A	H	A	H	H	A	A	H	A	A	H	A
Result	D	W	W	D	W	W	D	W	D	W	W	W	W	D	D	D	W	W	W	W	W	D	D	W	W	W	W	D	D	D	W	D	W	L
Position	7	2	2	2	2	2	1	1	1	1	1	1	1	1	1	1	1	1	1	1	1	1	1	1	1	1	1	1	1	1	1	1	1	1

Source: Competitive matches
A = Away; H = Home; W = Win; D = Draw; L = Loss; = Leader, 1956-57 European Cup; = 1956–57 Serie B

==== Matches ====
18 September 1955 1	Pro Patria	2–2	Fiorentina	Busto Arsizio
	Danova 60'; Orzan 80'	Report	9' Virgili; 48' Julinho	Stadium: Comunale; Referee: Erminio Piemonte

25 September 1955 2	Fiorentina	1–0	Padova	Florence
	Cervato 80' (pen.)	Report		Stadium: Comunale; Referee: Antonio Moriconi

2 October 1955 3	Juventus	0–4	Fiorentina	Turin
		Report	4' Montuori; 18', 88' Virgili; 54' Magnini	Stadium: Comunale; Referee: Erminio Piemonte

9 October 1955 4	Fiorentina	0–0	Inter	Florence
		Report		Stadium: Comunale; Referee: Francesco Liverani

16 October 1955 5	Bologna	0–2	Fiorentina	Bologna
		Report	84' Virgili; 86' (pen.) Cervato	Stadium: Stadio Renato Dall'Ara; Referee: Armando Marchetti

23 October 1955 6	Fiorentina	4–1	Atalanta	Florence
	Julinho 9', 25'; Montuori 13'; Virgili 30'	Report	65' Bassetto	Stadium: Comunale; Referee: Mario Maurelli

30 October 1955 7	Lanerossi	1–1	Fiorentina	Vicenza
	Murolo 75'	Report	39' Prini	Stadium: Stadio Romeo Menti; Referee: Vincenzo Orlandini

6 November 1955 8	Fiorentina	2–0	Torino	Florence
	Montuori 84', 87'	Report		Stadium: Comunale; Referee: Cesare Jonni

13 November 1955 9	Novara	1–1	Fiorentina	Novara
	Segato 58' (o.g.)	Report	33' Cervato	Stadium: Stadio Comunale; Referee: Vincenzo Orlandini

4 December 1955 10	Milan	0–2	Fiorentina	Milan
		Report	13' Montuori; 14' Virgili	Stadium: Stadio San Siro; Referee: Francesco Liverani

8 December 1955 11	Fiorentina	2–0	Roma	Florence
	Virgili 33'; Losi 82' (o.g.)	Report		Stadium: Comunale; Referee: Francesco Liverani

25 December 1955 12	Fiorentina	1–0	Triestina	Florence
	Julinho 26'	Report		Stadium: Comunale; Referee: Silvio Ferrari

31 December 1955 13	Napoli	2–4	Fiorentina	Rome
	Vitali 64'; Jeppson 75' (pen.)	Report	34', 76' Montuori; 51', 72' Virgili	Stadium: Stadio Nazionale; Referee: Francesco Liverani

8 January 1956 14	Fiorentina	0–0	SPAL	Florence
		Report		Stadium: Comunale; Referee: Alessandro Coppa

15 January 1956 15	Fiorentina	0–0	Sampdoria	Florence
		Report		Stadium: Comunale; Referee: Riccardo Pieri

22 January 1956 16	Lazio	2–2	Fiorentina	Rome
	Olivieri 72', 74'	Report	52' Virgili; 64' Julinho	Stadium: Stadio Olimpico; Referee: Cesare Jonni

29 January 1956 17	Fiorentina	3–1	Genoa	Florence
	Virgili 41'; Cervato 61' (pen.); Montuori 71'	Report	69' Pestrin	Stadium: Comunale; Referee: Vincenzo Orlandini

5 February 1956 18	Fiorentina	4–1	Pro Patria	Florence
	Cervato 30'; Virgili 35', 52'; Bizzarri 49'	Report	21' La Rosa	Stadium: Comunale; Referee: Tommaso Corallo

19 February 1956 19	Padova	0–1	Fiorentina	Padua
		Report	6' Gratton	Stadium: Stadio Silvio Appiani; Referee: Francesco Liverani

26 February 1956 20	Fiorentina	2–0	Juventus	Florence
	Montuori 86'; Prini 88'	Report		Stadium: Comunale; Referee: Erminio Piemonte

4 March 1956 21	Inter	1–3	Fiorentina	Milan
	Lorenzi 37'	Report	45', 68' Virgili; 70' Prini	Stadium: San Siro; Referee: Vincenzo Orlandini

11 March 1956 22	Fiorentina	0–0	Bologna	Florence
		Report		Stadium: Comunale; Referee: Cesare Jonni

18 March 1956 23	Atalanta	0–0	Fiorentina	Bergamo
		Report		Stadium: Comunale; Referee: Tommaso Corallo

25 March 1956 24	Fiorentina	2–0	Lanerossi	Florence
	Prini 54'; Virgili 61'	Report		Stadium: Comunale; Referee: Carlo Marangio

1 April 1956 25	Torino	0–1	Fiorentina	Turin
		Report	44' Montuori	Stadium: Stadio Filadelfia; Referee: (Austria) Alfred Grill

8 April 1956 26	Fiorentina	4–2	Novara	Florence
	Montuori 2', 33', 48'; Virgili 40'	Report	41' Savioni; 70' Marzani	Stadium: Comunale; Referee: Erminio Piemonte

15 April 1956 27	Fiorentina	3–0	Milan	Florence
	Prini 15'; Virgili 37', 63'	Report		Stadium: Comunale; Referee: Vincenzo Orlandini

29 April 1956 28	Roma	1–1	Fiorentina	Rome
	Da Costa 29'	Report	62' Virgili	Stadium: Stadio Olimpico; Referee: Francesco Liverani

6 May 1956 29	Triestina	1–1	Fiorentina	Trieste
	Brighenti 44'	Report	42' Julinho	Stadium: Stadio Giuseppe Grezar; Referee: Mario Maurelli

10 May 1956 30	Fiorentina	0–0	Napoli	Florence
		Report		Stadium: Comunale; Referee: (Austria) Kainer

13 May 1956 31	SPAL	0–1	Fiorentina	Ferrara
		Report	59' Carpanesi	Stadium: Comunale; Referee: Erminio Piemonte

20 May 1956 32	Sampdoria	0–0	Fiorentina	Genoa
		Report		Stadium: Stadio Luigi Ferraris; Referee: (Austria) Ferdinand Marschall

27 May 1956 33	Fiorentina	4–1	Lazio	Florence
	Lo Buono 6' (o.g.); Gratton 21'; Prini 64'; Virgili 70'	Report	47' Lo Buomo	Stadium: Comunale; Referee: Concetto Lo Bello

3 June 1956 34	Genoa	3–1	Fiorentina	Genoa
	Gren 74' (pen.); Frizzi 85'; Carapellese 90'	Report	24' Gratton	Stadium: Stadio Luigi Ferraris; Referee: Cesare Jonni

== Statistics ==
=== Player statistics ===
No.	Pos	Nat	Player	Total		1955–56 Serie A	
No.	Pos	Nat	Player	Apps	Goals	Apps	Goals
	GK	(Italy) ITA	Giuliano Sarti	25	0	25	0
	DF	(Italy) ITA	Sergio Cervato	33	5	33	5
	DF	(Italy) ITA	Ardico Magnini	32	1	32	1
	DF	(Italy) ITA	Francesco Rosetta	20	0	20	0
	MF	(Italy) ITA	Giuseppe Chiappella	32	0	32	0
	MF	(Italy) ITA	Guido Gratton	34	3	34	3
	MF	(Italy) ITA	Maurilio Prini	26	6	26	6
	MF	(Italy) ITA	Armando Segato	34	0	34	0
	FW	(Brazil) BRA	Julinho	31	6	31	6
	FW	(Argentina) ARG	Miguel Montuori	32	13	32	13
	FW	(Italy) ITA	Giuseppe Virgili	32	21	32	21
	GK	(Italy) ITA	Riccardo Toros	9	0	9	0
	MF	(Italy) ITA	Alberto Orzan	18	0	18	0
	FW	(Italy) ITA	Claudio Bizzarri	6	1	6	1
	MF	(Italy) ITA	Bruno Mazza	4	0	4	0
	MF	(Italy) ITA	Aldo Scaramucci	2	0	2	0
	DF	(Italy) ITA	Giampiero Bartoli	2	0	2	0
	MF	(Italy) ITA	Sergio Carpanesi	2	1	2	1
