= 1956–57 AC Fiorentina season =

Associazione Calcio Fiorentina
- Chairman: Enrico Befani
- Manager: Fulvio Bernardini
- Stadium: Comunale
- Serie A: 2nd
- European Cup: Runners-up
- Top goalscorer: League: Montuori (14); All: Montuori (15)
| Home colours | Away colours |

During 1956–57 Associazione Calcio Fiorentina competed in Serie A and European Cup.

== Summary ==
The club kept the majority of squad players and reached a decent 2nd place in Serie A just below Champions AC Milan. Brazilian Forward Julinho delivered another season being crucial for the good pace of the team. Argentinian Miguel Montuori finished as club topscorer.

However, the season is best remembered by the first European Cup participation for the club, which, clinched the 1957 European Cup Final only to be defeated by Real Madrid by a 2–0 score.

== Squad ==
Note: Flags indicate national team as defined under FIFA eligibility rules; some limited exceptions apply. Players may hold more than one non-FIFA nationality.

| Pos. | Nation | Player |
|---|---|---|
| GK | ITA | Giuliano Sarti |
| GK | ITA | Riccardo Toros |
| DF | ITA | Sergio Cervato |
| DF | ITA | Ardico Magnini |
| DF | ITA | Giacomo Del Gratta |
| DF | ITA | Sergio Pini |
| DF | ITA | Francesco Rosetta |
| MF | ITA | Alberto Orzan |
| MF | ITA | Sergio Carpanesi |
| MF | ITA | Aldo Scaramucci |
| MF | ITA | Maurilio Prini |

| Pos. | Nation | Player |
|---|---|---|
| MF | ITA | Giuseppe Chiappella |
| MF | ITA | Armando Segato |
| FW | ARG | Miguel Montuori |
| FW | ITA | Giuseppe Virgili |
| MF | ITA | Guido Gratton |
| FW | ITA | Romano Taccola |
| FW | ITA | Orlando Rozzoni |
| FW | ITA | Silvio Parodi Ramos |
| FW | ITA | Claudio Bizzarri |
| FW | BRA | Julinho |

=== Transfers ===
In
| Pos. | Name | from | Type |
|---|---|---|---|
| FW | Romano Taccola | | |
| FW | Orlando Rozzoni | | |
| FW | Silvio Parodi Ramos | | |
| DF | Giacomo Del Gratta | | |
| DF | Sergio Pini | | |

Out
| Pos. | Name | To | Type |
|---|---|---|---|
| DF | Giampiero Bartoli | | |
| MF | Bruno Mazza | | |

== Competitions ==
=== Serie A ===
==== League table ====
| Pos | Team | Pld | W | D | L | GF | GA | GD | Pts | Qualification or relegation |
|---|---|---|---|---|---|---|---|---|---|---|
| 1 | Milan (C) | 34 | 21 | 6 | 7 | 65 | 40 | +25 | 48 | Qualification to European Cup and for the Latin Cup |
| 2 | Fiorentina | 34 | 16 | 10 | 8 | 55 | 40 | +15 | 42 | |
| 3 | Lazio | 34 | 14 | 13 | 7 | 52 | 40 | +12 | 41 | |
| 4 | Udinese | 34 | 15 | 6 | 13 | 59 | 58 | +1 | 36 | |
| 5 | Internazionale | 34 | 11 | 13 | 10 | 53 | 45 | +8 | 35 | |

Source: Panini
(C) Champions

==== Results by round ====
| Round | 1 | 2 | 3 | 4 | 5 | 6 | 7 | 8 | 9 | 10 | 11 | 12 | 13 | 14 | 15 | 16 | 17 | 18 | 19 | 20 | 21 | 22 | 23 | 24 | 25 | 26 | 27 | 28 | 29 | 30 | 31 | 32 | 33 | 34 |
|---|---|---|---|---|---|---|---|---|---|---|---|---|---|---|---|---|---|---|---|---|---|---|---|---|---|---|---|---|---|---|---|---|---|---|
| Ground | A | H | A | H | A | H | A | H | A | A | H | H | A | H | H | A | H | H | A | H | A | H | A | H | A | H | H | A | A | H | A | A | H | A |
| Result | W | D | L | W | D | W | L | W | W | D | W | L | W | D | L | W | D | W | L | W | L | W | D | L | D | W | W | W | W | D | L | W | D | D |
| Position | 1 | 5 | 7 | 5 | 5 | 3 | 4 | 4 | 2 | 2 | 2 | 3 | 2 | 2 | 2 | 2 | 2 | 2 | 2 | 2 | 2 | 2 | 2 | 2 | 2 | 2 | 2 | 2 | 2 | 2 | 2 | 2 | 2 | 2 |

Source: Competitive matches
A = Away; H = Home; W = Win; D = Draw; L = Loss; = Leader, 1957-58 European Cup; = 1957–58 Serie B

==== Matches ====
| 16 September 1956 1 | Udinese | 2–5 | Fiorentina | Udine |
| | Lindskog 10'; Secchi 22' | | 1', 45' Montuori; 65' Julinho; 81' (pen.) Cervato; 87' Virgili | Stadium: Stadio Moretti; Referee: Liverani |

| 23 September 1956 2 | Fiorentina | 0–0 | SS Lazio | Florence |
| | | | | Stadium: Comunale; Referee: (Austria) Seipelt |

| 30 September 1956 3 | Torino | 2–1 | Fiorentina | Turin |
| | Arce 3'; Ricagni 39' | | 11'Montuori | Stadium: Stadio Filadelfia; Referee: Jonni |

| 7 October 1956 4 | Fiorentina | 2–0 | SPAL | Florence |
| | Julinho 59'; 74' Rozzoni | | | Stadium: Comunale; Referee: Guarnaschelli |

| 14 October 1956 5 | Sampdoria | 2–2 | Fiorentina | Genoa |
| | Agnoletto 16'; Ocwirk 69' (pen.) | | 43'Montuori; 72' Rozzoni | Stadium: Luigi Ferraris; Referee: Liverani |

| 21 October 1956 6 | Fiorentina | 2–1 | Bologna | Florence |
| | Montuori 68'; Gratton 80' | | 40'Cervellati | Stadium: Comunale; Referee: (Austria) Kainer |

| 28 October 1956 7 | Fiorentina | 0–3 | Milan | Florence |
| | | | 32' (o.g.) Rosetta; 49' Schiaffino; 67' Bean | Stadium: Comunale; Referee: Lo Bello |

| 18 November 1956 8 | AS Roma | 0–2 | Fiorentina | Rome |
| | | | 28', 83' Julinho | Stadium: Olimpico; Referee: Bonetto |

| 25 November 1956 9 | Fiorentina | 1–0 | Genoa | Florence |
| | Cervato 89' (pen.) | | | Stadium: Comunale; Referee: Griggi |

| 2 December 1956 10 | SSC Napoli | 1–1 | Fiorentina | Naples |
| | Moro 23' | | 43' Segato | Stadium: Stadio del Vomero; Referee: (Austria) Grill |

| 16 December 1956 11 | Fiorentina | 3–1 | Palermo | Florence |
| | Julinho 27'; Montuori 37', 63' | | 33' Luosi | Stadium: Comunale; Referee: Menchini |

| 23 December 1956 12 | Inter | 2–1 | Fiorentina | Milan |
| | Massei 18'; Lorenzi 66' | | 81' Virgili | Stadium: San Siro; Referee: (Austria) Roman |

| 30 December 1956 13 | Fiorentina | 3–0 | Triestina | Florence |
| | Virgili 12', 22'; Montuori 30' | | | Stadium: Comunale; Referee: Marangio |

| 6 January 1957 14 | Atalanta | 1–1 | Fiorentina | Bergamo |
| | Bassetto 8' | | 64'Julinho | Stadium: Comunale; Referee: Liverani |

| 13 January 1957 15 | Lanerossi Vicenza | 4–0 | Fiorentina | Vicenza |
| | Chiappella 12' (o.g.); Valentinuzzi 20'; David 61'; Motta 72' | | | Stadium: Romeo Menti; Referee: Orlandini |

| 20 January 1957 16 | Fiorentina | 3–0 | Padova | Florence |
| | Virgili 43'; Bizzarri 67'; Montuori 84' | | | Stadium: Comunale; Referee: Corallo |

| 27 January 1957 17 | Juventus | 1–1 | Fiorentina | Turin |
| | Boniperti 12' | | 80' (pen.)Cervato | Stadium: Comunale; Referee: Orlandini |

| 3 February 1957 18 | Fiorentina | 2–1 | Udinese | Florence |
| | Bizzarri 23', 90' | | 18' | Stadium: Comunale; Referee: De Gregorio |

| 10 February 1957 19 | SS Lazio | 3–0 | Fiorentina | Rome |
| | Tozzi 45'; Vivolo 48' (pen.); Selmosson 90' | | | Stadium: Olimpico; Referee: Pieri |

| 17 February 1957 20 | Fiorentina | 1–0 | Torino | Florence |
| | Julinho 65' | | | Stadium: Comunale; Referee: Guarnaschelli |

| 24 February 1957 21 | SPAL | 2–1 | Fiorentina | Ferrara |
| | Segato 21' (o.g.); Firotto 56' | | 54' Rozzoni | Stadium: Comunale; Referee: (Austria) Meyer |

| 3 March 1957 22 | Fiorentina | 3–0 | Sampdoria | Florence |
| | Parodi 2'; Julinho 51'; Virgili 55' | | | Stadium: Comunale; Referee: Liverani |

| 10 March 1957 23 | Bologna | 2–2 | Fiorentina | Bologna |
| | Rosetta 11' (o.g.); Cervellati 44' (pen.) | | 27' Virgili; 89' Julinho | Stadium: Renato Dall'Ara; Referee: (Austria) Grill |

| 17 March 1957 24 | AC Milan | 2–0 | Fiorentina | Milan |
| | Galli 29', 52' | | | Stadium: San Siro; Referee: Moriconi |

| 24 March 1957 25 | Fiorentina | 2–2 | AS Roma | Florence |
| | Montuori 56', 86' | | 31', 76' Nordahl | Stadium: Comunale; Referee: Pieri |

| 31 March 1957 26 | Genoa | 1–2 | Fiorentina | Genoa |
| | Dal Monte 8' | | 23' Bizzarri; 59' Virgili | Stadium: Luigi Ferraris; Referee: Marchetti |

| 7 April 1957 27 | Fiorentina | 4–0 | SSC Napoli | Florence |
| | Cervato 21' (pen.); Virgili 31'; Montuori 42', 61' | | | Stadium: Comunale; Referee: Famulari |

| 14 April 1957 28 | Palermo | 0–1 | Fiorentina | Palermo |
| | | | 38'Cervato | Stadium: La Favorita; Referee: Piemonte |

| 28 April 1957 29 | Fiorentina | 3–1 | Inter | Florence |
| | Gratton 38'; Montuori 40'; Prini 77' | | 51' Vonlanthen | Stadium: Comunale; Referee: Orlandini |

| 5 May 1957 30 | Triestina | 0–0 | Fiorentina | Trieste |
| | | | | Stadium: Grezar; Referee: Righi |

| 19 May 1957 31 | Fiorentina | 0–1 | Atalanta | Florence |
| | | | 6' Mion | Stadium: Comunale; Referee: Moriconi |

| 2 June 1957 32 | Fiorentina | 2–1 | Lanerossi Vicenza | Florence |
| | Parodi 13'; Taccola 59' | | 16'Lojacono | Stadium: Comunale; Referee: Maurelli |

| 9 June 1957 33 | Padova | 2–2 | Fiorentina | Padua |
| | Boscolo 16'; Bonistalli 65' | | 79'Bizzarri; 87' Magnini | Stadium: Silvio Appiani; Referee: Ferrari |

| 16 June 1957 34 | Fiorentina | 2–2 | Juventus | Florence |
| | Bizzarri 75'; Virgili 89' | | 65' Stivanello; 85' (pen.) Montico | Stadium: Comunale; Referee: Caputo |

=== European Cup ===
==== Eightfinals ====
| 21 novembre 1956 1 | Fiorentina (Italy) | 1–1 | (Sweden) IFK Norrköping | Florence |
| 14:30 CET | Bizzarri 15' | | 8' Bild | Stadium: Comunale; Referee: (France) Dean Harzic |

| 28 November 1956 2 | IFK Norrköping (Sweden) | 0–1 | (Italy) Fiorentina | Norrköping |
| 14:30 CET | | | 16'Virgili | Stadium: Nya Parken; Referee: (France) Michel Devillers |

==== Quarterfinals ====
| 6 February 1957 1 | Fiorentina (Italy) | 3–1 | (Switzerland) Grasshoppers F.C. | Florence |
| 15:00 CET | Segato 3'; Taccola 10', 12' | | 31' Ballaman | Stadium: Comunale; Referee: (Austria) Fritz Seipelt |

| 27 February 1957 2 | Grasshoppers F.C. (Switzerland) | 2–2 | (Italy) Fiorentina | Zürich |
| 20:00 CET | Ballaman 25'; Vukosavljević 85' | | 7' Julinho; 52' Montuori | Stadium: Hardturm; Referee: (Austria) Fritz Seipelt |

==== Semifinals ====
| 3 April 1957 1 | Crvena Zvezda (Socialist Federal Republic of Yugoslavia) | 0–1 | (Italy) Fiorentina | Belgrado |
| 15:45 EET | | | 88' Prini | Stadium: Stadio Rajko Mitić; Referee: Arbitro: (Belgium) Albert Alsteen |

| 18 April 1957 2 | Fiorentina (Italy) | 0–0 | (Socialist Federal Republic of Yugoslavia) Crvena Zvezda | Florence |
| 16:15 CET | | | | Stadium: Comunale; Referee: (Netherlands) Klaas Schipper |

==== Final ====
| 30 May 1957 | Real Madrid (Spain) | 2–0 | (Italy) Fiorentina | Madrid |
| | Di Stéfano 69' (pen.); Gento 76' | | | Stadium: Santiago Bernabeu; Attendance: 124 000; Referee: (Netherlands) Leopold Sylvain Horn |

== Statistics ==
=== Player statistics ===
| No. | Pos | Nat | Player | Total | | 1956–57 Serie A | | 1956–57 European Cup | |
| No. | Pos | Nat | Player | Apps | Goals | Apps | Goals | Apps | Goals |
|---|---|---|---|---|---|---|---|---|---|
| | GK | (Italy) ITA | Giuliano Sarti | 26 | -28 | 22 | -25 | 4 | -3 |
| | DF | (Italy) ITA | Sergio Cervato | 37 | 5 | 30 | 5 | 7 | 0 |
| | DF | (Italy) ITA | Ardico Magnini | 34 | 1 | 29 | 1 | 5 | 0 |
| | MF | (Italy) ITA | Alberto Orzan | 37 | 0 | 31 | 0 | 6 | 0 |
| | MF | (Italy) ITA | Giuseppe Chiappella | 28 | 0 | 24 | 0 | 4 | 0 |
| | MF | (Italy) ITA | Armando Segato | 37 | 2 | 30 | 1 | 7 | 1 |
| | MF | (Italy) ITA | Guido Gratton | 35 | 2 | 30 | 2 | 5 | 0 |
| | FW | (Argentina) ARG | Miguel Montuori | 37 | 15 | 30 | 14 | 7 | 1 |
| | FW | (Italy) ITA | Giuseppe Virgili | 26 | 11 | 22 | 10 | 4 | 1 |
| | FW | (Italy) ITA | Claudio Bizzarri | 24 | 6 | 21 | 5 | 3 | 1 |
| | FW | (Brazil) BRA | Julinho | 37 | 10 | 30 | 9 | 7 | 1 |
| | GK | (Italy) ITA | Riccardo Toros | 15 | -18 | 12 | -15 | 3 | -3 |
| | DF | (Italy) ITA | Francesco Rosetta | 18 | 0 | 15 | 0 | 3 | 0 |
| | MF | (Italy) ITA | Aldo Scaramucci | 15 | 0 | 11 | 0 | 4 | 0 |
| | FW | (Italy) ITA | Orlando Rozzoni | 10 | 3 | 9 | 3 | 1 | 0 |
| | MF | (Italy) ITA | Maurilio Prini | 11 | 2 | 9 | 1 | 2 | 1 |
| | FW | (Italy) ITA | Silvio Parodi Ramos | 9 | 2 | 7 | 2 | 2 | 0 |
| | FW | (Italy) ITA | Romano Taccola | 9 | 4 | 6 | 2 | 3 | 2 |
| | MF | (Italy) ITA | Sergio Carpanesi | 3 | 0 | 3 | 0 | | |
| | DF | (Italy) ITA | Sergio Pini | 1 | 0 | 1 | 0 | | |
| | DF | (Italy) ITA | Giacomo Del Gratta | | | | | | |

- Source: http://calcio-seriea.net/presenze/1956/445/
