= 1958 Coppa Italia final =

10th Coppa Italia final
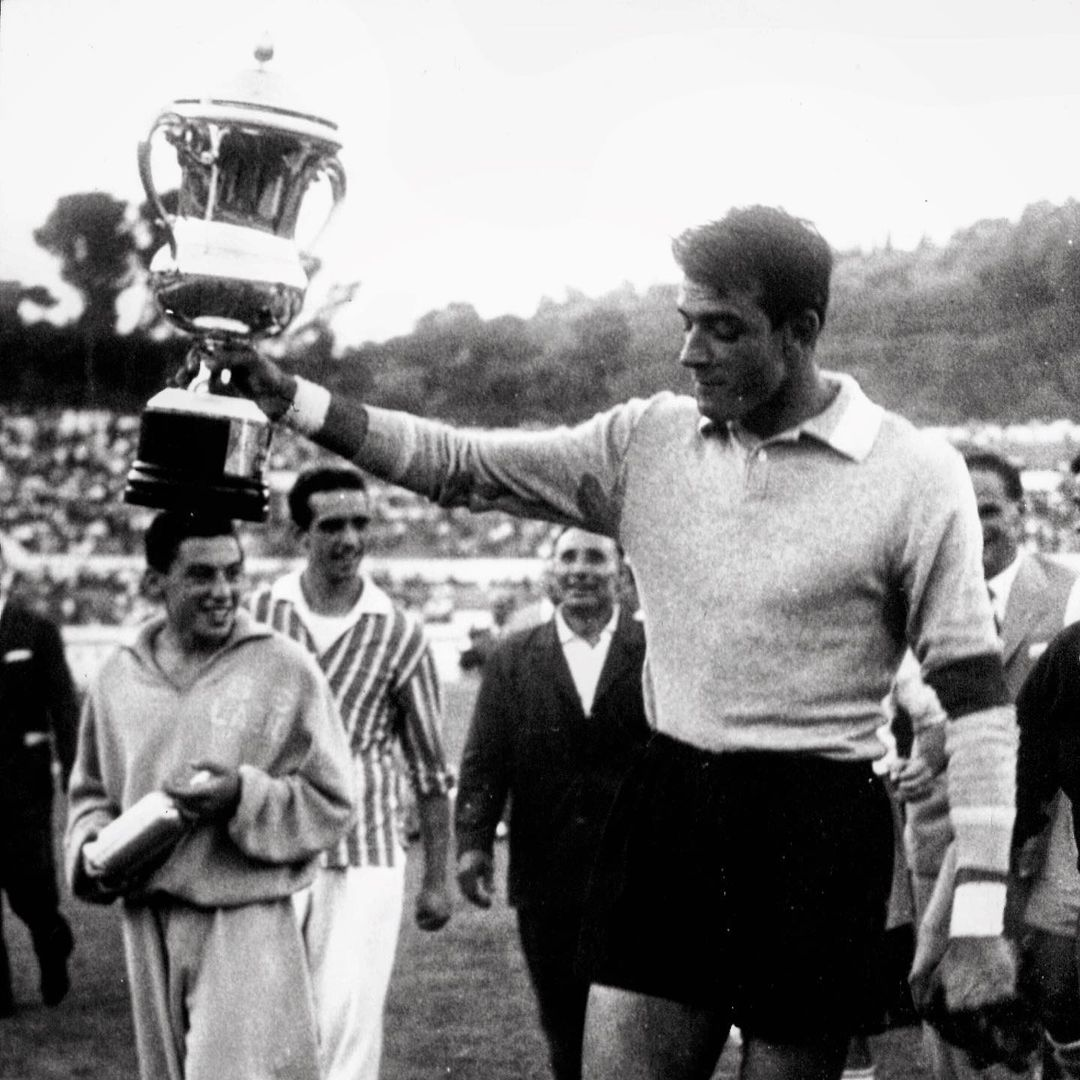
- Lazio captain Lovati raises the trophy
- Event: 1958 Coppa Italia
Lazio	Fiorentina
1	0
- Date: 24 September 1958
- Venue: Stadio Olimpico, Rome
- Referee: Gennaro Marchese

The 1958 Coppa Italia final was the final of the 1958 Coppa Italia, the tenth final overall of this competition, and the first one after a long 15 year break due to WW2. The match was played on 24 September 1958 between Lazio and Fiorentina. Lazio won 1–0; it was their first victory.

== Match ==
24 September 1958

Lazio	1–0	Fiorentina
Prini 30'

Stadio Olimpico, Rome
Referee: Gennaro Marchese

Lazio	Fiorentina

GK	1	(Italy) Roberto Lovati
DF	2	(Italy) Francesco Janich
DF	3	(Italy) Nicola Lo Buono
MF	4	(Italy) Franco Carradori
MF	5	(Italy) Egidio Fumagalli
MF	6	(Italy) Umberto Pinardi
MF	7	(Italy) Ugo Pozzan
MF	8	(Italy) Carlo Tagnin
FW	9	(Italy) Claudio Bizzarri
FW	10	(Brazil) Humberto Tozzi
FW	11	(Italy) Maurilio Prini
Manager:
(Italy) Fulvio Bernardini

GK	1	(Italy) Giuliano Sarti
DF	2	(Italy) Sergio Castelletti
DF	3	(Italy) Enzo Robotti
DF	4	(Italy) Sergio Cervato
RW	5	(Italy) Francisco Lojacono
MF	6	(Italy) Guido Gratton
MF	7	(Italy) Giuseppe Chiappella
MF	8	(Italy) Armando Segato
LW	9	(Argentina) (Italy) Miguel Montuori
FW	10	(Sweden) Kurt Hamrin
FW	11	(Italy) Paolo Morosi
Manager:
(Italy) Luigi Ferrero
