= 1954 FIFA World Cup qualification Group 9 =

Football tournament qualifying stage

The 1954 FIFA World Cup qualification Group 9 contained Italy and Egypt.

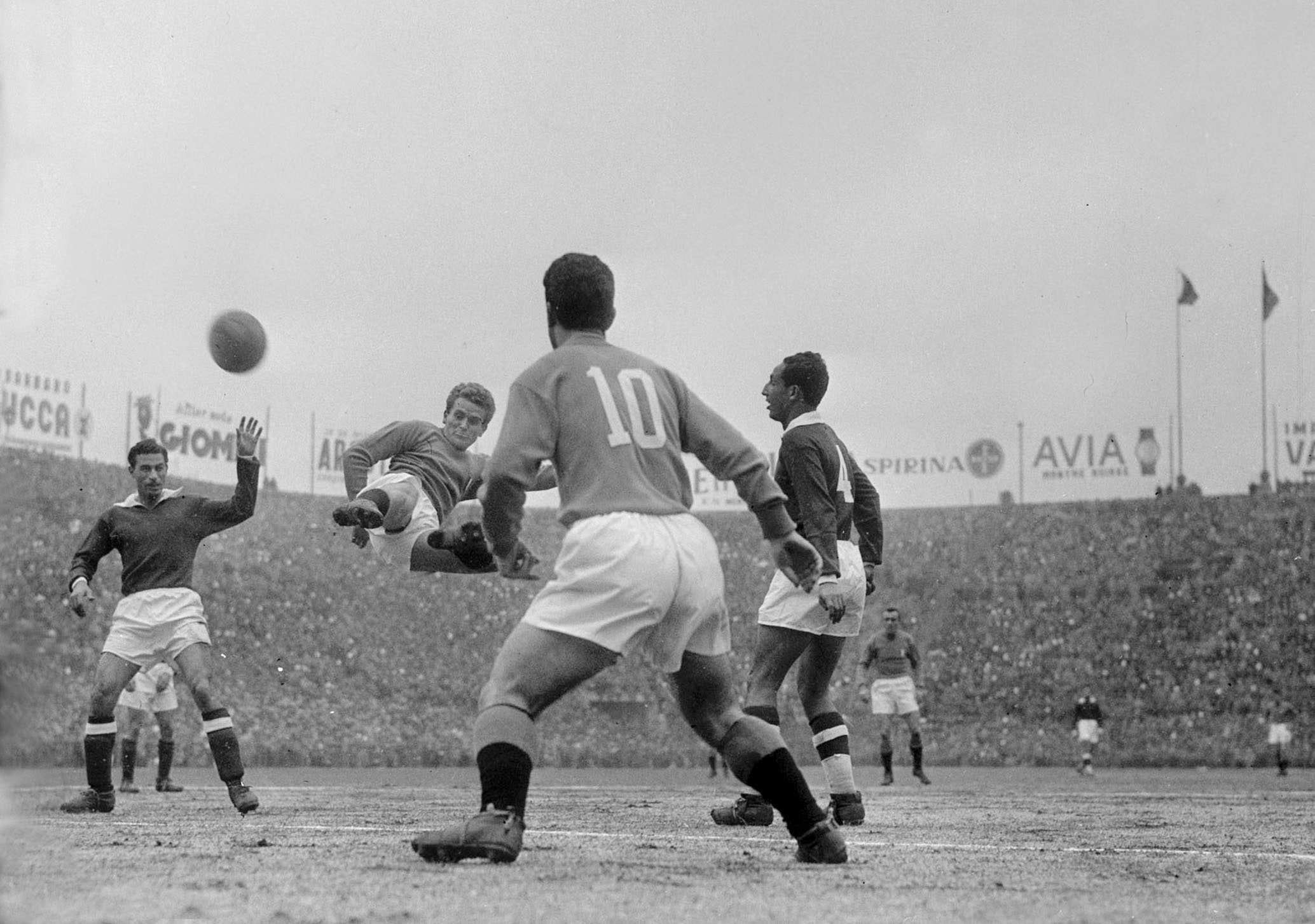
Italian captain Giampiero Boniperti in the air during the home game versus Egypt at San Siro, January 24, 1954.

== Table ==
Rank	Team	Pts	Pld	W	D	L	GF	GA	GD
1	Italy	4	2	2	0	0	7	2	+5
2	Egypt	0	2	0	0	2	2	7	−5

== Matches ==
13 November 1953	Egypt	1 – 2	Italy	Al Ahly Stadium, Cairo
	Ad-Diba 33'		Frignani 62'; Muccinelli 79'	Attendance: 22,000; Referee: Steiner (Austria)

24 January 1954	Italy	5 – 1	Egypt	Milan Municipality Stadium, Milan
	Pandolfini 1'; Frignani 62'; Boniperti 65', 86'; Ricagni 84'		El-Hamouly 32'	Attendance: 40,000; Referee: Horn (Netherlands)

Italy qualified.

== Team stats ==
=== Italy ===
Head coach: Technical Commission: (Hungary) Lajos Czeizler, (Italy) Angelo Schiavio, (Italy) Silvio Piola

Pos.	Player	DoB	Games played	Goals	Minutes played	Sub off	Sub on	(Egypt)	(Egypt)	Club
DF	Dino Ballacci	24 May 1924	1	0	48	0	1	–	52	(Italy) Bologna F.C. 1909
FW	Giampiero Boniperti	4 July 1928	2	2	180	0	0	90	90	(Italy) Juventus FC
DF	Sergio Cervato	22 March 1929	2	0	132	1	0	90	42	(Italy) Fiorentina
MF	Giuseppe Chiappella	28 September 1924	2	0	180	0	0	90	90	(Italy) Fiorentina
GK	Leonardo Costagliola	27 October 1921	2	0	180	0	0	90	90	(Italy) Fiorentina
FW	Amleto Frignani	5 March 1932	2	2	180	0	0	90	90	(Italy) A.C. Milan
MF	Guido Gratton	23 September 1932	1	0	90	0	0	90	–	(Italy) Fiorentina
DF	Ardico Magnini	21 October 1928	2	0	180	0	0	90	90	(Italy) Fiorentina
FW	Ermes Muccinelli	28 July 1927	2	1	180	0	0	90	90	(Italy) Juventus FC
FW	Egisto Pandolfini	19 February 1926	1	1	90	0	0	–	90	(Italy) A.S. Roma
FW	Eduardo Ricagni	29 April 1926	1	1	90	0	0	–	90	(Italy) Juventus FC
MF	Francesco Rosetta	9 October 1922	2	0	180	0	0	90	90	(Italy) Fiorentina
FW	Armando Segato	3 May 1930	2	0	180	0	0	90	90	(Italy) Fiorentina
MF	Pasquale Vivolo	6 January 1928	1	0	90	0	0	90	–	(Italy) S.S. Lazio

=== Egypt ===
Head coach: (Egypt) Abdulrahman Fawzi

Pos.	Player	DoB	Games played	Goals	Minutes played	Sub off	Sub on	(Italy)	(Italy)	Club
GK	Ahmed Kato		2	0	173	0	1	90	83	(Egypt) Al Ittihad Alexandria
DF	Yakan Hussein	12 September 1934	2	0	180	0	0	90	90	(Egypt) Zamalek SC
DF	Sayed Abougreisha	8 July 1926	1	0	90	0	0	90	–	(Egypt) Ismaily SC
MF	Hamza Abdel Mawla		2	0	180	0	0	90	90	(Egypt) Tersana SC
DF	Hanafy Bastan (C)	6 December 1923	2	0	180	0	0	90	90	(Egypt) Zamalek SC
MF	Helmy Abou El Maaty		2	0	180	0	0	90	90	(Egypt) Al Ahly SC
FW	Ahmed Mekkawi		2	0	180	0	0	90	90	(Egypt) Al Ahly SC
FW	Essam Baheeg	26 February 1931	2	0	153	0	1	90	63	(Egypt) Zamalek SC
MF	Ad-Diba	17 November 1927	1	1	90	0	0	90	–	(Egypt) Al Ittihad Alexandria
FW	Sherif El Far	1 May 1928	2	0	180	0	0	90	90	(Egypt) Zamalek SC
FW	Ahmed Abou Hussein		1	0	42	1	0	42	–	(Egypt) Zamalek SC
FW	Kadura		1	0	48	0	1	48	–	(Egypt) El-Olympi
GK	Abdel Galil Hameida		1	0	7	1	0	–	7	(Egypt) Al Ahly SC
DF	Nour El-Dali	24 October 1928	1	0	90	0	0	–	90	(Egypt) Zamalek SC
FW	Alaa El-Hamouly	4 July 1930	1	1	90	0	0	–	90	(Egypt) Zamalek SC
FW	El-Dhizui	14 September 1926	1	0	27	1	0	–	27	(Egypt) Al-Masry SC
FW	Toutou	1926	1	0	90	0	0	–	90	(Egypt) Al Ahly SC
