= 1957 European Cup final =

- Event: 1956–57 European Cup
Real Madrid	Fiorentina
(Spain)	(Italy)
2	0
- Date: 30 May 1957
- Venue: Santiago Bernabéu Stadium, Madrid
- Referee: Leo Horn (Netherlands)
- Attendance: 124,000

The 1957 European Cup final was a football match played at the Santiago Bernabéu Stadium in Madrid, Spain, on 30 May 1957 to determine the winners of the 1956–57 European Cup. It was contested between Real Madrid of Spain and Fiorentina of Italy. Real Madrid won 2–0 after goals from Alfredo Di Stéfano and Francisco Gento in the second half. It was the first of four finals (also counting the Champions League era, followed by the 1965, 1984 and 2012 finals) where one of the teams played in its home stadium, and also the first final when the winning team played at their home stadium.

Controversy surrounded Real Madrid's first goal after Dutch referee Leo Horn ignored his linesman signalling that Enrique Mateos was offside before awarding a penalty for a foul on Mateos that appeared to have been committed outside the penalty area.

By winning the final, Real Madrid became the first team to successfully defend the European Cup.

== Route to the final ==
(Spain) Real Madrid				Round	(Italy) Fiorentina			
Opponent	Agg.	1st leg	2nd leg		Opponent	Agg.	1st leg	2nd leg
(Austria) Rapid Wien	5–5 (Replay: 2–0)	4–2 (H)	1–3 (A)	First round	(Sweden) IFK Norrköping	2–1	1–1 (H)	1–0 (A)
(France) Nice	6–2	3–0 (H)	3–2 (A)	Quarter-finals	(Switzerland) Grasshoppers	5–3	3–1 (H)	2–2 (A)
(England) Manchester United	5–3	3–1 (H)	2–2 (A)	Semi-finals	(Socialist Federal Republic of Yugoslavia) Red Star Belgrade	1–0	1–0 (A)	0–0 (H)

=== Real Madrid ===
Real Madrid qualified for the 1956–57 European Cup as the competition's defending champions, having beaten Reims 4–3 in the 1956 final at the Parc des Princes in Paris. As the title holders, they were given a bye directly to the first round, where they were drawn against Austrian champions Rapid Wien. Two goals each from Alfredo Di Stéfano and Ramón Marsal gave them a 4–2 win in the first leg at the Santiago Bernabéu Stadium. In the second leg, Ernst Happel scored a hat-trick to put Rapid 3–0 ahead, but a Di Stéfano goal made the score 3–1. The game finished 5–5 on aggregate. As the away goals rule was not implemented until 1965, a play-off took place at the Bernabéu, where goals from Joseíto and Raymond Kopa gave Madrid a 2–0.

The quarter-finals saw Real take on French champions Nice. A Joseíto goal and two from Enrique Mateos gave Madrid a 3–0 win at home. In the away tie, Jacques Foix pulled a goal back for Nice, but another goal from Joseíto and two by Di Stéfano secured Madrid's victory; a late penalty by Nice's Ferry meant the tie finished 6–2 on aggregate.

Manchester United were Real's opponents in the semi-finals. Goals from Héctor Rial and Di Stéfano put Madrid 2–0 up just after the hour mark; Manchester United pulled a goal back through Tommy Taylor, but Mateos' goal a minute later cancelled it out. Kopa and Rial each scored in the first half in the second leg at Old Trafford, which practically put the tie beyond doubt, though Taylor and Bobby Charlton scored in the second half to reduce the aggregate score to 5–3. That result sent Real Madrid through to their second straight European Cup final.

=== Fiorentina ===
Fiorentina qualified after winning the 1955–56 Serie A. They were placed into the South-Central Europe group for the preliminary round draw, but were not among the first four teams drawn and received a bye to the first round. There they faced IFK Norrköping of Sweden, who had also received a bye. In the first leg at Stadio Artemio Franchi, they fell behind to an early goal by Harry Bild, but Claudio Bizzarri equalised shortly afterwards and the match finished 1–1. In the second leg, Giuseppe Virgili scored the only goal of the game to give Fiorentina a 2–1 win on aggregate.

In the quarter-finals against Grasshoppers of Switzerland, Fiorentina jumped out to a 3–0 lead early in the first leg thanks to goals from Armando Segato and Romano Taccola (2), but Robert Ballaman pulled one back for the visitors. Julinho extended Fiorentina's aggregate lead early in the second leg, only for Ballaman to again reduce the Swiss side's deficit; nevertheless, Miguel Montuori scored Fiorentina's fifth goal of the tie, rendering Branislav Vukosavljević's late goal mere consolation in a 5–3 aggregate scoreline.

Red Star Belgrade of Yugoslavia were Fiorentina's opponents in the semi-finals. The first leg was played in Belgrade and went goalless until two minutes from the end, when Maurilio Prini scored for the Italians. The second leg went goalless, and Fiorentina won the tie to become the first Italian side to reach the European Cup final.

== Match ==
The final was held at the Santiago Bernabéu on 30 May 1957. Leo Horn of the Netherlands refereed the game. A penalty from Di Stéfano and a goal from Gento gave Madrid a 2–0 victory and retention of the title. This was their second European Cup victory in as many years.

=== Details ===
30 May 1957
17:30 CET (Note: Originally scheduled for 20:00, Fiorentina requested that kick-off was brought forward as they were not accustomed to playing under artificial lights.)

Real Madrid (Spain)	2–0	(Italy) Fiorentina
Di Stéfano 69' (pen.); Gento 75'	Report

Santiago Bernabéu, Madrid
Attendance: 124,000
Referee: Leo Horn (Netherlands)

Real Madrid	Fiorentina

GK	1	(Spain) Juan Alonso
RB	2	(Spain) Manuel Torres
CH	5	(Spain) Marquitos
LB	3	(Spain) Rafael Lesmes
RH	4	(Spain) Miguel Muñoz (c)
LH	6	(Spain) José María Zárraga
OR	7	(France) Raymond Kopa
IR	8	(Spain) Enrique Mateos
CF	9	(Spain) Alfredo Di Stéfano (Note: Di Stéfano, a native Argentine, had represented both Argentina and Colombia earlier in his international career; however, he became a naturalised citizen of Spain in 1956, and began playing in the Spain national team in 1957.)
IL	10	(Spain) Héctor Rial
OL	11	(Spain) Paco Gento
Manager:
(Spain) José Villalonga

GK	1	(Italy) Giuliano Sarti
RB	2	(Italy) Ardico Magnini
LB	3	(Italy) Sergio Cervato (c)
RH	4	(Italy) Aldo Scaramucci
CH	5	(Italy) Alberto Orzan
LH	6	(Italy) Armando Segato
OR	7	(Brazil) Julinho
IR	8	(Italy) Guido Gratton
CF	9	(Italy) Giuseppe Virgili
IL	10	(Italy) Miguel Montuori
OL	11	(Italy) Claudio Bizzarri
Manager:
(Italy) Fulvio Bernardini

== See also ==
- 1956–57 Real Madrid CF season
- ACF Fiorentina in European football
- Real Madrid CF in international football
