= 1954 Campeonato Paulista =

São Paulo football season

Campeonato Paulista
- Season: 1954
- Champions: Corinthians
- Relegated: Juventus; Ypiranga
- Matches: 182
- Goals: 647 (3.55 per match)
- Top goalscorer: Humberto Tozzi (Palmeiras) – 36 goals
- Biggest home win: Santos 9-0 XV de Jaú (October 17, 1954)
- Biggest away win: São Bento de São Caetano 0-4 Corinthians (October 7, 1954); Linense 1-5 Santos (January 9, 1955)
- Highest scoring: Santos 8-4 Linense (December 30, 1954)

The 1954 Campeonato Paulista da Primeira Divisão, organized by the Federação Paulista de Futebol, was the 53rd season of São Paulo's top professional football league. Corinthians won the title for the 15th time. Juventus and Ypiranga were relegated. For the second consecutive season, Palmeiras's Humberto Tozzi was the top scorer with 36 goals.

== Championship ==
The championship was disputed in a double-round robin system, with the team with the most points winning the title and the two teams with the fewest points being relegated. In that season, São Bento de São Caetano entered the championship, that team being the product of a merge between Comercial and São Caetano EC.

Pos	Team	Pld	W	D	L	GF	GA	GD	Pts	Qualification or relegation
1	Corinthians	26	18	6	2	55	25	+30	42	Champions
2	Palmeiras	26	17	3	6	84	38	+46	37	
3	Santos	26	16	2	8	70	43	+27	34	
4	São Paulo	26	14	5	7	41	29	+12	33	
5	Portuguesa	26	13	2	11	49	44	+5	28	
6	Ponte Preta	26	11	3	12	45	48	−3	25	
7	XV de Jaú	26	11	3	12	49	59	−10	25	
8	Guarani	26	10	4	12	37	44	−7	24	
9	Linense	26	8	5	13	38	53	−15	21	
10	São Bento de São Caetano	26	8	4	14	33	50	−17	20	
11	Noroeste	26	5	10	11	38	56	−18	20	
12	XV de Piracicaba	26	8	4	14	35	54	−19	20	
13	Juventus	26	7	5	14	45	53	−8	19	Relegated
14	Ypiranga	26	5	6	15	28	51	−23	16	Relegated

Updated to match(es) played on February 13, 1955. Source: RSSSF.com
Rules for classification: 1) points; 2) goal difference; 3) wins; 4) number of goals scored.

== Top Scores ==
Rank	Player	Club	Goals
1	Humberto Tozzi	Palmeiras	36
2	Gino	São Paulo	18
3	Rodrígues	Palmeiras	17
4	Amorim	Juventus	15
4	Oswaldinho	Portuguesa	15
4	Walter Marciano	Santos	15
7	Álvaro	Santos	14
7	Luizinho	Corinthians	14
7	Baltasar	Ponte Preta	14
10	Américo Murolo	Linense	13
10	Hermes	XV de Jaú	13
10	Nestor	XV de Jaú	13
10	Nininho	Ponte Preta	13
10	Tite	Santos	13
