= Ardico Magnini =

Italian footballer (1928–2020)

Personal information
- Full name: Ardico Magnini
- Date of birth: 21 October 1928
- Place of birth: Pistoia, Italy
- Date of death: 3 July 2020 (aged 91)
- Place of death: Pistoia
- Height: 1.78 m (5 ft 10 in)
- Position: Defender

Senior career*
Years	Team	Apps	(Gls)
1947–1950	Pistoiese	78	(13)
1950–1958	Fiorentina	225	(6)
1958–1960	Genoa	26	(2)
1960–1961	Prato	21	(0)
Total		350	(21)

International career
1953–1957	Italy	20	(0)
- * Club domestic league appearances and goals

Ardico Magnini (Italian pronunciation: [arˈdiːko maɲˈɲiːni]; 21 October 1928 – 3 July 2020) was an Italian footballer who played as a defender.

== Club career ==
Along with Sergio Cervato, Magnini formed the defensive partnership of Fulvio Bernardini's Fiorentina back-line. After winning the championship with the club in 1956, he played another two seasons in Florence before going to Genoa, and finished his career at Prato in Serie B.

== International career ==
After Giampiero Boniperti, Ardico Magnini, along with club team mates Cervato, Egisto Pandolfini and Armando Segato, is one of five 'Azzurri' with the most caps for the national team during the difficult rebuilding years of the fifties, following the Superga air disaster in 1949. He made two appearances at the 1954 World Cup with Italy, and 20 in total between 1953 and 1957.

== Honours ==
Fiorentina

- Serie A Winners: 1955–56; Runner-up: 1956–57, 1957–58
- European Cup Runner-up: 1956–57

Individual

- Serie A Team of The Year: 1952, 1953, 1954, 1955, 1956
