= 1958 Coppa Italia =

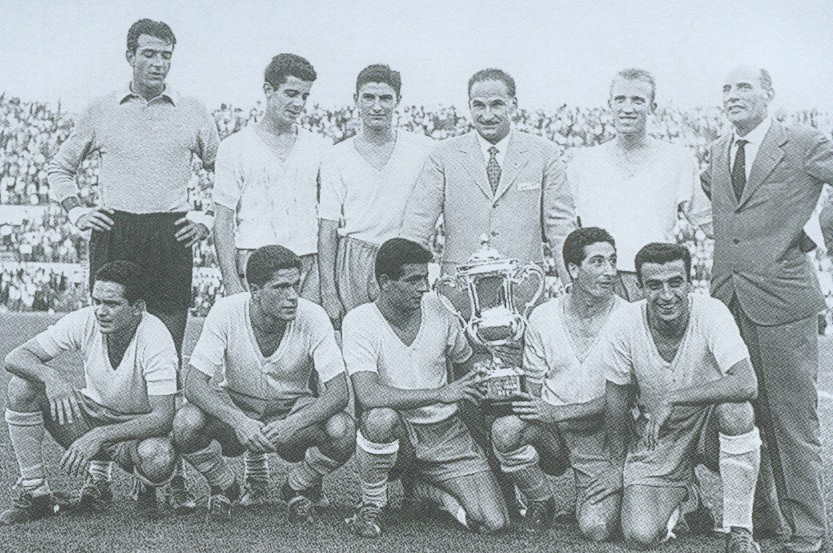
- Lazio poses with the trophy

Tournament details
- Country: Italy
- Dates: 7 June 1958 – 4 Nov 1958
- Teams: 32

Final positions
- Champions: Lazio (1st title)
- Runners-up: Fiorentina

Tournament statistics
- Matches played: 44
- Goals scored: 401 (9.11 per match)
- Top goal scorer: Humberto Tozzi (11 goals)

The 1958 Coppa Italia was the 11th Coppa Italia, the major Italian domestic cup. Lazio won the tournament, defeating Fiorentina 1–0 in the final.

== Group stage ==
=== Group 1 ===
Pos	Team	Pld	W	D	L	GF	GA	GD	Pts
1	Juventus	6	5	1	0	16	6	+10	11
2	Torino	6	3	1	2	13	6	+7	7
3	Biellese	6	1	1	4	9	14	−5	3
4	Pro Vercelli	6	1	1	4	4	16	−12	3

=== Group 2 ===
Pos	Team	Pld	W	D	L	GF	GA	GD	Pts
1	Sampdoria	6	5	0	1	17	6	+11	10
2	Genoa	6	4	1	1	16	8	+8	9
3	Alessandria	6	1	1	4	11	15	−4	3
4	Vigevano	6	1	0	5	9	24	−15	2

=== Group 3 ===
Pos	Team	Pld	W	D	L	GF	GA	GD	Pts
1	Milan	6	5	1	0	18	5	+13	11
2	Internazionale	6	3	1	2	14	9	+5	7
3	Monza	6	2	0	4	11	11	0	4
4	Como	6	1	0	5	3	21	−18	2

=== Group 4 ===
Pos	Team	Pld	W	D	L	GF	GA	GD	Pts
1	Padova	6	4	0	2	13	9	+4	8
2	Vicenza	6	2	2	2	5	4	+1	6
3	Brescia	6	2	2	2	6	10	−4	6
4	Venezia	6	1	2	3	9	10	−1	4

=== Group 5 ===
Pos	Team	Pld	W	D	L	GF	GA	GD	Pts
1	Marzotto Valdagno	6	5	0	1	12	5	+7	10
2	Triestina	6	3	1	2	10	8	+2	7
3	Udinese	6	2	1	3	7	6	+1	5
4	Ravenna	6	1	0	5	6	16	−10	2

=== Group 6 ===
Pos	Team	Pld	W	D	L	GF	GA	GD	Pts
1	Bologna	6	4	1	1	14	11	+3	9
2	Reggiana	6	3	2	1	11	8	+3	8
3	SPAL	6	3	0	3	19	13	+6	6
4	Modena	6	0	1	5	6	18	−12	1

=== Group 7 ===
Pos	Team	Pld	W	D	L	GF	GA	GD	Pts
1	Fiorentina	6	6	0	0	18	3	+15	12
2	Siena	6	3	0	3	8	9	−1	6
3	Prato	6	2	0	4	8	11	−3	4
4	Carbosarda	6	1	0	5	5	16	−11	2

=== Group 8 ===
Pos	Team	Pld	W	D	L	GF	GA	GD	Pts
1	Lazio	6	4	2	0	18	7	+11	10
2	Roma	6	3	1	2	10	8	+2	7
3	Palermo	6	2	1	3	13	15	−2	5
4	Napoli	6	1	0	5	7	18	−11	2

== Quarter-finals ==
Home team	Score	Away team
Milan	2-4	Bologna
Lazio	2-1	Marzotto Valdagno
Fiorentina	2-1	Padova
Sampdoria	2-3 (aet)	Juventus

== Semi-finals ==
Home team	Score	Away team
Fiorentina	4-2	Bologna
Lazio	2-0	Juventus

== Semi-final 5-8 place matches ==
Home team	Score	Away team
Milan	8-1	Padova
Sampdoria	9-0	Marzotto Valdagno

== Third place match ==
Home team	Score	Away team
Juventus	3-3 (p: 4-4)	Bologna

p=after penalty shoot-out

== Final ==
24 September 1958

Lazio	1–0	Fiorentina
Prini 30'

Stadio Olimpico, Rome
Referee: Gennaro Marchese

=== Final 5-6 place match ===
Date: 4 Nov 1958

Home team	Score	Away team
Milan	0-1	Sampdoria

=== Final 7-8 place match ===
Date: 4 Nov 1958

Home team	Score	Away team
Padova	2-2 (p: 4–5)	Marzotto Valdagno

p=after penalty shoot-out

== Top goalscorers ==
Rank	Player	Club	Goals
1	(Brazil) Humberto Tozzi	Lazio	11
2	(Italy) Gianfranco Petris	Torino, Fiorentina	10
3	(Argentina) (Italy) Omar Sívori	Juventus	9
4	(Italy) Giancarlo Danova	Milan	7
4	(Brazil) Wilson Sorio	SPAL	7
6	(Italy) Pasquale Parodi	Alessandria	6
6	(Italy) Paolo Barison	Genoa	6
6	(Italy) Carlo Galli	Milan	6
6	(Italy) Sergio Brighenti	Padova	6
6	(Italy) Giulio Bonafin	Bologna	6
6	(Italy) Aurelio Milani	Triestina, Sampdoria	6
