= Guido Gratton =

Italian footballer

Personal information
- Full name: Guido Gratton
- Date of birth: 23 October 1932
- Place of birth: Monfalcone, Italy
- Date of death: 26 November 1996 (aged 64)
- Place of death: Bagno a Ripoli, Italy
- Height: 1.75 m (5 ft 9 in)
- Position: Midfielder

Senior career*
Years	Team	Apps	(Gls)
1949–1950	Parma	?	(?)
1950–1952	Vicenza	41	(10)
1952–1953	Como	30	(3)
1953–1960	Fiorentina	193	(28)
1960–1961	Napoli	17	(1)
1961	Lazio	5	(1)
1961–1962	Inter	0	(0)

International career
1953–1959	Italy	11	(3)
- * Club domestic league appearances and goals

Guido Gratton (Italian pronunciation: [ˈɡwiːdo ɡratˈton]; 23 September 1932 – 26 November 1996) was an Italian footballer who played as a midfielder.

== Club career ==
A Friulian from Monfalcone, Guido Gratton played for Fiorentina in the 1950s, together with players such as Julinho, Virgili, and Montuori. During his time at the club, the team won the Serie A championship during the 1955–56 season, followed by 4 consecutive 2nd-place finishes; Fiorentina also reached the 1957 European Cup Final but lost to Real Madrid.

In the 1958–59 season the team established the record for the most goals scored in an 18-team league (95, nearly 3 goals per game). Before his time with the 'Gigliati' he played for Parma, Vicenza and Como. In 1960 he went to play for Napoli and finally Lazio at the age of thirty.

== International career ==
Gratton also played as an offensive midfielder for the Italy national team, where he earned eleven caps between 1953 and 1959, scoring 3 goals, and was on the roster for the 1954 World Cup.

== Death ==
In 1996, Gratton was murdered by robbers who entered his home to steal proceeds from a tennis club Gratton was managing.

== Honours ==
Fiorentina

- Serie A: 1955–56

Individual

- ACF Fiorentina Hall of Fame: 2023
