= Alberto Orzan =

Italian footballer (1931–2022)

Personal information
- Date of birth: 24 July 1931
- Place of birth: San Lorenzo Isontino, Italy
- Date of death: 9 August 2022 (aged 91)
- Place of death: Florence, Italy
- Position: Defender

Senior career*
| Years | Team | Apps | (Gls) |
| 1953–1954 | Udinese | 13 | (0) |
| 1954–1963 | Fiorentina | 192 | (3) |
| Total | | 205 | (3) |

International career
| 1956–1957 | Italy | 4 | (0) |
- * Club domestic league appearances and goals

Alberto Orzan (Italian pronunciation: [alˈbɛrto ˈɔrdzan]; 24 July 1931 – 9 August 2022) was an Italian footballer who played as a defender. He represented the Italy national team four times, the first time being on 11 November 1956, the occasion of a 1955–60 Central European International Cup match against Switzerland in a 1–1 away draw. He was the last surviving player from the 1956–57 European Cup final.

== Honours ==
Fiorentina

- Serie A: 1955–56
- Coppa Italia: 1960–61
- European Cup Winners' Cup: 1960–61
