= Leo Horn =

Dutch football referee (1916–1995)

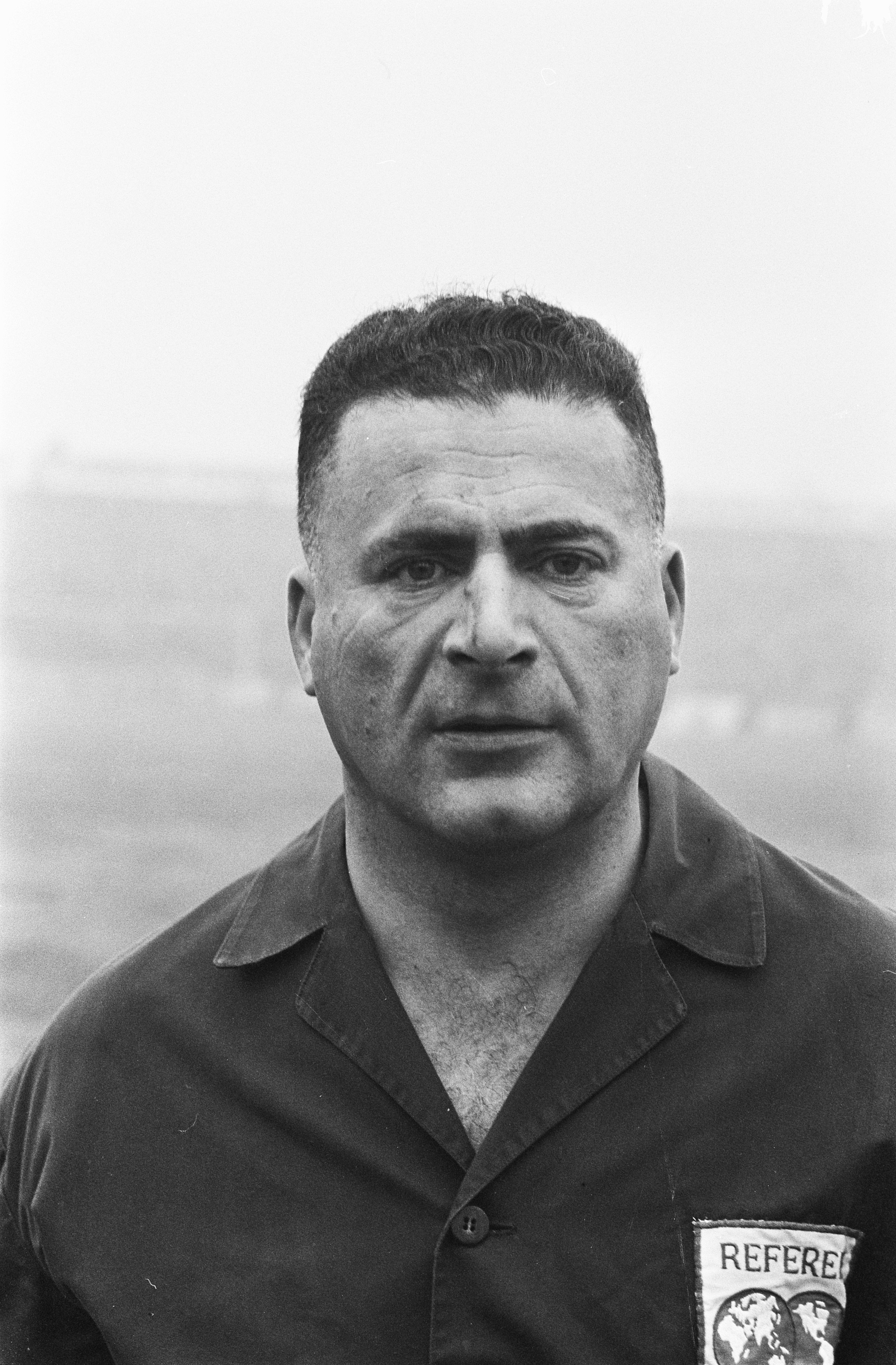
- Horn in 1964
- Full name: Leopold Sylvain Horn
- Born: 29 August 1916; Sittard, Netherlands
- Died: 16 September 1995 (aged 79); Amstelveen, Netherlands

International
Years	League	Role
1933–1966	FIFA listed	Referee

Leopold Sylvain Horn (29 August 1916 – 16 September 1995) was a Dutch football referee.

Horn was born in Sittard, where he was a friend of entertainer Toon Hermans. The family moved to Amsterdam in 1928. Horn became a clerk with the textile firm Lehmann & Co, and became an amateur referee, after his playing career was ended by a knee injury.

== Second World War ==
Horn came to prominence as a referee after the Second World War. During the War Horn fought with the Dutch Resistance and had been awarded a black belt in judo. Horn was suspended from refereeing by the Royal Dutch Football Association on orders of the annexed Dutch Government on account of being Jewish, in 1941. His brother, Edgar Horn, was murdered in a concentration camp. Another brother, George Horn, was able to go into hiding thanks to Kuki Krol, the father of later footballer Ruud Krol, and hence survived the war.

== Major matches ==
Horn was placed in charge of the famous 1953 England–Hungary match at Wembley Stadium and is one of only four men to have refereed two European Champions' Cup finals, beginning with the 1957 final in the competition's second year. In the 1962 final against Benfica, Real Madrid player Ferenc Puskás was seen to throw something into the crowd. Ken Jones, an English journalist, later asked Horn why he had not cautioned Puskás. Horn replied: "What you don't know is that I threw my whistle at Puskás," Horn said. "It hit him in the ear." (It was the whistle that Puskás had thrown into the crowd). The next September Horn refereed the playoff of the 1962 Copa Libertadores Finals after the original two-legged tie ended in a draw.

Toward the end of his career Horn was appointed to referee the Leeds United v Valencia match in the Inter Cities Fairs Cup on 2 February 1966. Jack Charlton, after being struck by a Valencian player, struck out and a free-for-all ensued, only to be broken up by the police. Horn lead both sides off the pitch, expelling Charlton and Vidagany in the tunnel. Of this game, Jack Charlton said: "One of the greatest storms in European football burst about the heads of Leeds United when they played Valencia. I was in the centre of the row – three players, including myself, were ordered off; both teams were also summoned from the field for a spell to allow heated tempers to cool" Horn claimed: 'Money was the cause of the trouble. You could almost smell it on the pitch.' Don Revie said: 'If this is European football I think we are better out of it'."

He refereed his last match Ajax vs. Bulgaria on 31 August 1966.

== Personal life ==
Horn became a firm friend of Abraham Klein later in life. He died in Amstelveen aged 79.

Preceded by European Cup Final 1956 (England) Arthur Edward Ellis	European Cup Referees; Final 1957 (Netherlands) Leo Horn	Succeeded by European Cup Final 1958 (Belgium) Albert Alsteen
Preceded by European Cup Final 1961 (Switzerland) Gottfried Dienst	European Cup Referees; Final 1962 (Netherlands) Leo Horn	Succeeded by European Cup Final 1963 (England) Arthur Holland
