= Enrico Befani =

Italian textile industrialist and football executive

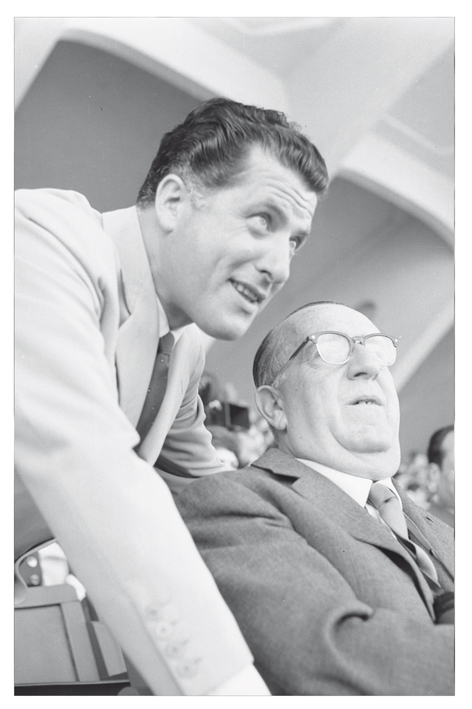
- Befani with Luigi Ridolfi Vay da Verrazzano
- Born: 15 November 1910; Prato, Italy
- Died: 29 October 1968 (aged 57)
- Occupation: Textile industrialist
- Known for: Chairman of ACF Fiorentina

Enrico Befani (15 November 191 – 29 October 1968) was an Italian textile industrialist, known for being the chairman of Italian professional football club ACF Fiorentina from 1951 to 1961.

Under his presidency, Fiorentina won their first scudetto in 1955–56 Serie A, as well as the 1960–61 European Cup Winners' Cup and the 1960–61 Coppa Italia. Fiorentina were also runner-up in the 1956–57 European Cup.

In 2013, he was inducted into ACF Fiorentina Hall of Fame.
