= Sergio Cervato =

Italian footballer

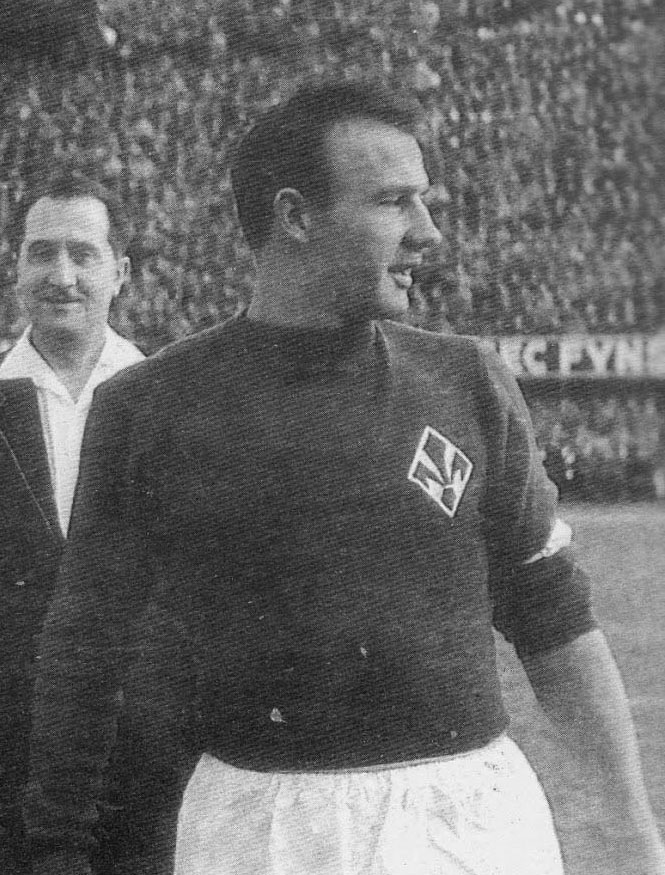
- Cervato as Fiorentina captain in the late 1950s

Personal information
- Full name: Sergio Cervato
- Date of birth: 22 October 1929
- Place of birth: Carmignano di Brenta, Italy
- Date of death: 9 October 2005 (aged 76)
- Place of death: Florence, Italy
- Position: Left back

Youth career
- 1946–1947: Tombolo

Senior career*
Years	Team	Apps	(Gls)
1947–1948	Bolzano	17	(0)
1948–1959	Fiorentina	316	(31)
1959–1961	Juventus	62	(7)
1961–1965	SPAL	91	(7)
Total		486	(45)

International career
1951–1960	Italy	28	(4)

Managerial career
- 1966–1967: Pescara
- 1967–1968: Trani
- 1968–1970: Empoli
- * Club domestic league appearances and goals

Sergio Cervato (Italian pronunciation: [ˈsɛrdʒo tʃerˈvaːto]; 22 March 1929 – 9 October 2005) was an Italian footballer who played as a defender.

== Club career ==
Cervato was born in Carmignano di Brenta, province of Padua. Playing for Fiorentina, he formed a formidable defensive partnership with Ardico Magnini; despite being a left-back, however, Cervato often contributed to the Viola's attacks, scoring 31 goals during his 10 years in Florence.

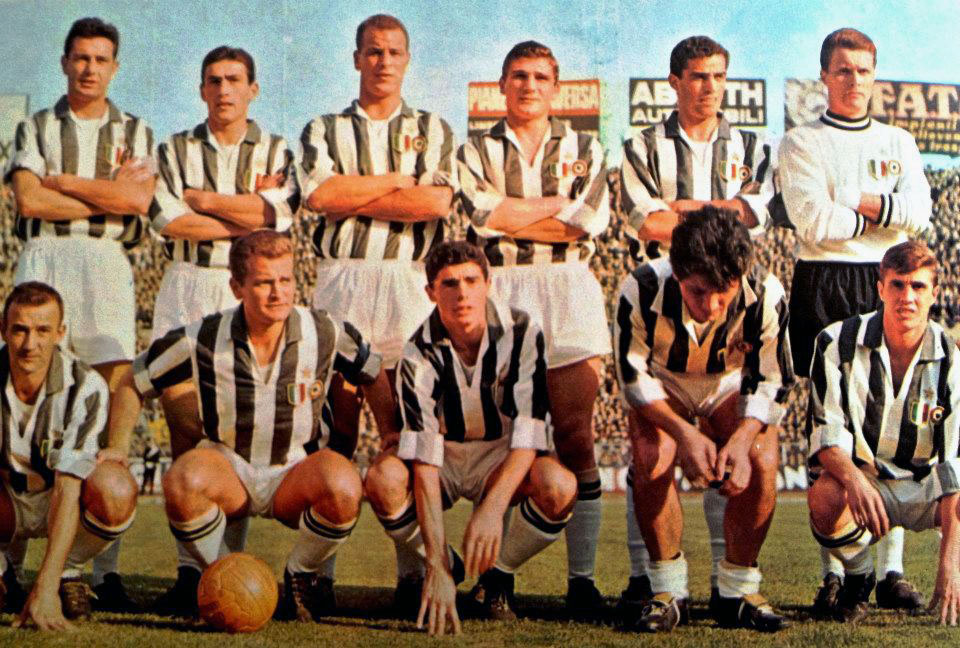
Cervato (crouched, first from left) with Juventus scudettata in the 1960–61 season.

During the 1955–56 Serie A season, Cervato won the Serie A title ("Scudetto") with Fiorentina as the club's captain, his only title with the club; the 1955–56 title-winning side under Fulvio Bernardini lost just one game – the last one at Genoa – and is regarded as one of the best Serie A teams of all time. Following the team's Serie A triumph, the squad narrowly missed out on several more league titles, finishing as runners-up for the next four consecutive years in 1957, 1958, 1959 and 1960. During his time with Fiorentina, Cervato also helped the club to reach the 1957 European Cup Final; despite a strong performance, Fiorentina were defeated 2–0 by Real Madrid.

After leaving the Florence side in 1959, Cervato won 2 more league titles with Fiorentina's rivals Juventus. He ended his career in 1965 with Spal Ferrara in Serie B. In Serie A he played a total of 466 matches and scored 45 goals.

== International career ==
With the Italy national team, Cervato obtained 28 international caps, scored 4 goals, and participated at the 1954 FIFA World Cup.

== Style of play ==
One of the finest defenders of Serie A, Cervato was a quick and tireless competitor. As a left-back, he often contributed to his team's attacks; he also boasted a fierce shot and took both penalties and free-kicks.

== Managing career ==
After he retired, Cervato managed the Pescara, Empoli, and Fiorentina youth teams.

== Death ==
Cervato died at 76 years old in Florence.

== Honours ==
Fiorentina

- Serie A Winners: 1955–56; Runner-up: 1956–57, 1957–58, 1958–59
- European Cup Runner-up: 1956–57
- Coppa Italia Runner-up: 1958–59, 1959–60

Juventus

- Serie A Winners: 1959–60, 1960–61
- Coppa Italia Winners: 1959–60

Individual

- Serie A Team of The Year: 1951, 1953, 1954, 1956
