= Leonardo Costagliola =

Italian footballer and manager

Personal information
- Full name: Leonardo Costagliola
- Date of birth: 27 October 1921
- Place of birth: Taranto, Italy
- Date of death: 7 March 2008 (aged 86)
- Place of death: Florence, Italy
- Height: 1.70 m (5 ft 7 in)
- Position: Goalkeeper

Senior career*
Years	Team	Apps	(Gls)
1938–1940	Pro Italia Taranto	17 +?	(0 +?)
1940–1943	Bari	71	(0)
1943–44	U.S. Conversano	?	(?)
1945–1948	Bari	100	(0)
1948–1955	Fiorentina	230	(0)
Total		418 +?	(0 +?)

International career
1953–1954	Italy	3	(0)
- * Club domestic league appearances and goals

Leonardo Costagliola (Italian pronunciation: [leoˈnardo kostaʎˈʎɔːla]; 27 October 1921 – 7 March 2008) was an Italian football player and manager who played as a goalkeeper. Throughout his career, he played for several Italian clubs and represented the Italy national football team at the 1954 FIFA World Cup.

== Club career ==
Born in Taranto, throughout his career (1938–1963) Costagliola played a total of 623 matches, playing for Italian clubs Pro Italia Taranto (1938–1940), A.S. Bari (1940–1943; 1945–1948), U.S. Conversano (1943–1944), and AC Fiorentina (1948–1955). He made his Serie A debut with Bari, on 27 October 1940, in a 4–2 away win over Triestina.

== International career ==
Regarded as one of the best and most consistent Italian shot-stoppers of his generation, with the Italy national team, Costagliola played 3 games between 1953 and 1954 and participated at the 1954 FIFA World Cup, although he did not feature in the competition. He made his Italy senior debut in a 2–1 away win over Egypt, on 13 November 1953, in a World Cup qualifier.

== After retirement ==
After retiring, Costagliola started a career as a trainer, managing several Italian clubs.
