= Sergio Carpanesi =

Italian football player and coach (1936–2026)

Personal information
- Date of birth: 21 March 1936
- Place of birth: La Spezia, Italy
- Date of death: 21 September 2026 (aged 90)
- Place of death: Florence, Italy
- Height: 1.74 m (5 ft 9 in)
- Position: Midfielder

Senior career*
Years	Team	Apps	(Gls)
1955–1959	Fiorentina	31	(1)
1959–1960	Palermo	30	(1)
1960–1961	SPAL	34	(2)
1961–1967	Roma	158	(4)
1967–1969	Sampdoria	23	(0)
1969–1971	Anconitana	57	(0)
1971–1972	Angelana	12	(0)

Managerial career
- 1973–1976: Maceratese
- 1978–1979: Lecco
- 1979–1980: Pisa
- 1980–1981: Monza
- 1982–1984: Prato
- 1985–1990: Spezia
- 1990–1991: Mantova
- 1995–1997: Spezia
- * Club domestic league appearances and goals

Sergio Carpanesi (21 March 1936 – 21 September 2026) was an Italian football player and coach who played as a midfielder.

Carpanesi played for 13 seasons (276 games, 8 goals) in Serie A for Fiorentina, Palermo, SPAL, Roma and Sampdoria.

Carpanesi died on 21 September 2026, at the age of 90.

== Honours ==
Fiorentina

- Serie A: 1955–56

Roma

- Coppa Italia: 1963–64
- Inter-Cities Fairs Cup: 1960–61

Individual

- ACF Fiorentina Hall of Fame: 2022
