= Armando Segato =

Italian footballer and manager (1930–1973)

Personal information
- Full name: Armando Segato
- Date of birth: 3 May 1930
- Place of birth: Vicenza, Italy
- Date of death: 19 February 1973 (aged 42)
- Place of death: Florence, Italy
- Height: 1.78 m (5 ft 10 in)
- Position: Midfielder

Senior career*
Years	Team	Apps	(Gls)
1948–1950	Cagliari	57	(9)
1950–1952	Prato	69	(13)
1952–1960	Fiorentina	231	(16)
1960–1964	Udinese	85	(6)
Total		442	(44)

International career
1953–1959	Italy	20	(0)
- * Club domestic league appearances and goals

Armando Segato (Italian pronunciation: [arˈmando seˈɡaːto]; 3 May 1930 – 19 February 1973) was an Italian footballer and manager who played as a midfielder.

== Club career ==
Armando Segato was born in Vicenza, Italy. He played as a left halfback for the fabulous Fiorentina side of the 1950s, which won one Serie A championship during the 1955–56 season, followed by 4 consecutive 2nd-place finishes, and also reached the 1957 European Cup Final, only to lose to Real Madrid. In 1961 Fiorentina became the first Italian team to win a European title, the 1961 Cup Winners Cup, but he had just left Florence for a smaller Italian side, Udinese, where he closed his career in Serie B in 1964.

== International career ==
With the Italy national team, Segato was among the most featured players in the decade, obtaining 20 caps between 1953 and 1959. He took part at the 1954 World Cup and played in a game against Switzerland.

== Style of play ==
A left halfback, Segato was known in particular to the 'Viola' fans for his accurate left-footed defence-splitting passes and crosses, which often met the runs of Fiorentina team-mates Julinho and Virgili. He was known to be a loyal, correct and athletic midfielder, who was known for leading by example on the pitch, and was well-respected by both his opponents and team-mates alike.

== Honours ==
Fiorentina

- Serie A: 1955–56; runner-up: 1956–57, 1957–58, 1958–59
- European Cup runner-up: 1956–57
- Coppa Italia runner-up: 1958–59, 1959–60

Individual

- Corriere dello Sport Serie A Team of The Year: 1954, 1956, 1958
