= Humberto Tozzi =

Brazilian footballer (1934-1980)

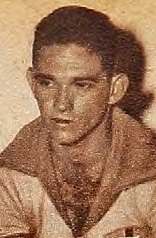
- Tozzi in 1954

Personal information
- Full name: Humberto Barbosa Tozzi
- Date of birth: 4 February 1934
- Place of birth: São João de Meriti, Brazil
- Date of death: 17 April 1980 (aged 46)
- Place of death: Rio de Janeiro, Brazil
- Position: Striker

Senior career*
Years	Team	Apps	(Gls)
1950–1953	São Cristóvão		
1953–1956	Palmeiras		
1956–1960	Lazio	92	(32)
1960–1961	Palmeiras		
1961	Fluminense		

International career
1954–1955	Brazil	7	(1)
- * Club domestic league appearances and goals

Humberto Barbosa Tozzi (4 February 1934 – 17 April 1980) was a Brazilian international footballer who played as a forward for São Cristóvão, Palmeiras, Lazio and Fluminense. Tozzi represented Brazil at the 1952 Summer Olympics and the 1954 FIFA World Cup.

While playing at Lazio, Humberto won the 1958 Coppa Italia final and was the top scorer in the competition with 11 goals.

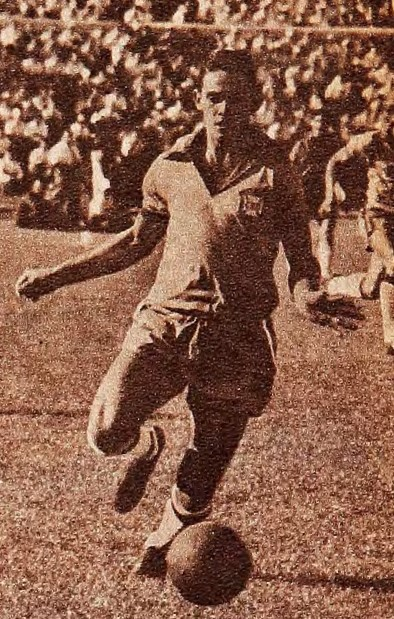
Tozzi in 1954.

== Honours ==
Lazio

- Coppa Italia: 1958

Individual

- Campeonato Paulista top scorer: 1953, 1954
- Coppa Italia top scorer: 1958
