= Nicola Lo Buono =

Italian footballer

Personal information
- Full name: Nicola Lo Buono
- Date of birth: 4 June 1933
- Place of birth: Bari, Italy
- Date of death: 8 September 2009 (aged 76)
- Place of death: Rome, Italy
- Position: Left-back

Senior career*
Years	Team	Apps	(Gls)
1954–1955	Fortis Trani	?	(?)
1955–1961	Lazio	91	(2)
1962–1964	Pescara	40	(0)
- * Club domestic league appearances and goals

Nicola Lo Buono (4 June 1933 – 8 September 2009) was an Italian football defender who played as a left-back.

== Career ==
Lo Buono began his career with Fortis Trani before moving to Lazio in 1955. He made his debut for the club on 11 March 1956 in a derby against Roma, which Lazio won 1–0. He went on to play 91 league matches for Lazio, and was a member of the side that won the club's first major trophy, the Coppa Italia, in 1958, appearing in eight of the nine matches of that campaign. He moved to Pescara in 1962, where he played for two seasons before retiring.
