= Francesco Rosetta =

Italian footballer

Personal information
- Full name: Francesco Rosetta
- Date of birth: 9 October 1922
- Place of birth: Biandrate, Italy
- Date of death: 8 December 2006 (aged 84)
- Place of death: Galliate, Italy
- Position: Defender

Senior career*
Years	Team	Apps	(Gls)
1941–1946	Novara	80	(0)
1946–1947	Torino	13	(0)
1947–1948	Alessandria	32	(0)
1948–1957	Fiorentina	245	(1)
1957–1958	Verona	23	(0)

International career
1949–1956	Italy	7	(0)
- * Club domestic league appearances and goals

Francesco Rosetta (Italian pronunciation: [franˈtʃesko roˈzetta]; 9 October 1922 – 8 December 2006) was an Italian footballer who played as a defender. He represented the Italy national football team seven times, the first being on 22 May 1949, the occasion of a 1948–53 Central European International Cup match against Austria in a 3–1 home win.

== Honours ==
=== Player ===
Torino

- Serie A: 1946–47

Fiorentina

- Serie A: 1955–56
