= Giuliano Sarti =

Italian footballer (1933–2017)

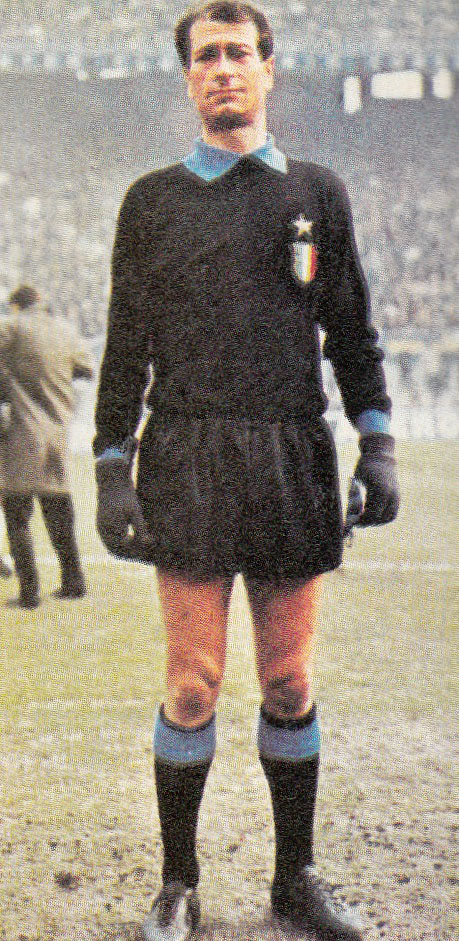
- Sarti with Inter Milan in the 1960s

Personal information
- Date of birth: 2 October 1933
- Place of birth: Castello d'Argile, Italy
- Date of death: 5 June 2017 (aged 83)
- Place of death: Florence, Italy
- Height: 1.78 m (5 ft 10 in)
- Position: Goalkeeper

Senior career*
Years	Team	Apps	(Gls)
1952–1953	Centese		
1953–1954	Bondenese		
1954–1963	Fiorentina	220	(0)
1963–1968	Inter Milan	147	(0)
1968–1969	Juventus	10	(0)
1969–1973	Unione Valdinievole		

International career
1959–1967	Italy	8	(0)
- * Club domestic league appearances and goals

Giuliano Sarti (Italian pronunciation: [dʒuˈljaːno ˈsarti]; 2 October 1933 – 5 June 2017) was an Italian professional football player, who played in the position of goalkeeper. Throughout his successful career, he played for several Italian clubs, although he is mostly remembered for his success with Fiorentina, and as the goalkeeper of the "Grande Inter" side of the 1960s that conquered both Italy and Europe.

== Club career ==
Sarti is mostly remembered for his successful stints at Fiorentina and Inter Milan, clubs with which he won several domestic and international trophies. After starting his career in the lower divisions with season long stints at Centese (1952–53) and Bondenese (1953–54), he moved to Fiorentina in 1954, where he soon managed to obtain a place in the team's starting line-up despite competition from Leonardo Costagliola initially, and later Enrico Albertosi. During his time with the club (1954–63), he won the Serie A, the Coppa Italia and the European Cup Winners' Cup titles.

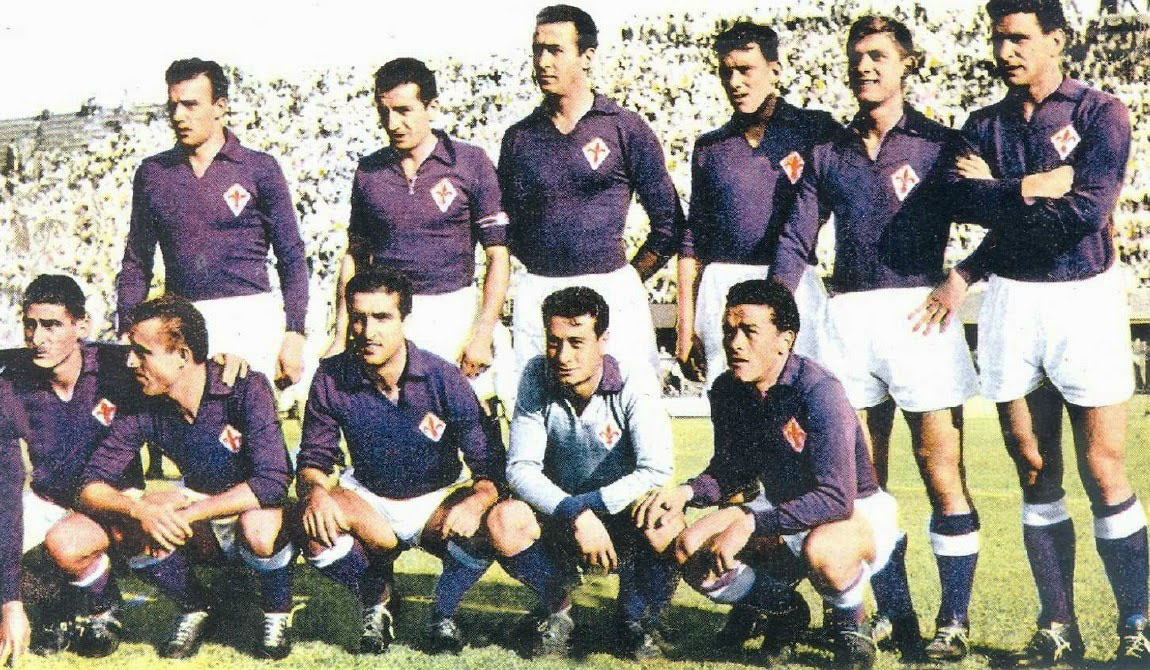
Sarti (crouched, second from right) with Fiorentina scudettata in the 1955–56 season

Sarti is particularly regarded for his role as the starting keeper in the highly successful "Grande Inter" side of the 1960s under manager Helenio Herrera. He joined the club in 1963, and during his time with the team, he formed a legendary partnership with fullbacks Burgnich and Facchetti, as well as sweeper Armando Picchi, in Inter's tenacious "catenaccio" defence that helped the team to conquer Italian, European, and World football. During his five seasons with the club, he won two Serie A titles, two European Cups, and two Intercontinental Cups. After leaving Inter in 1968, he later spent the 1968–69 season with Juventus as a back-up to Roberto Anzolin. He subsequently joined Unione Valdinievole the following season, where he remained until his retirement in 1973.

== International career ==
Sarti also represented Italy eight times throughout his career between 1959 and 1967, although he was never called up for a major tournament with Italy due to competition from several other notable Italian goalkeepers at the time. He made his international debut on 29 November 1959, in a 1–1 home draw against Hungary.

== Style of play ==
Sarti is frequently evealuated by sports commentators as one of the most successful Italian goalkeepers of this era, and in football history. He was recognized for his consistency, reliability and shot-stopping capabilities, Analysts also noted his composure, distinct personality, strong mindset, and precise positioning. This positional awareness allowed him to make efficient, straightforward saves, rather than relying primarily on athletic movements.

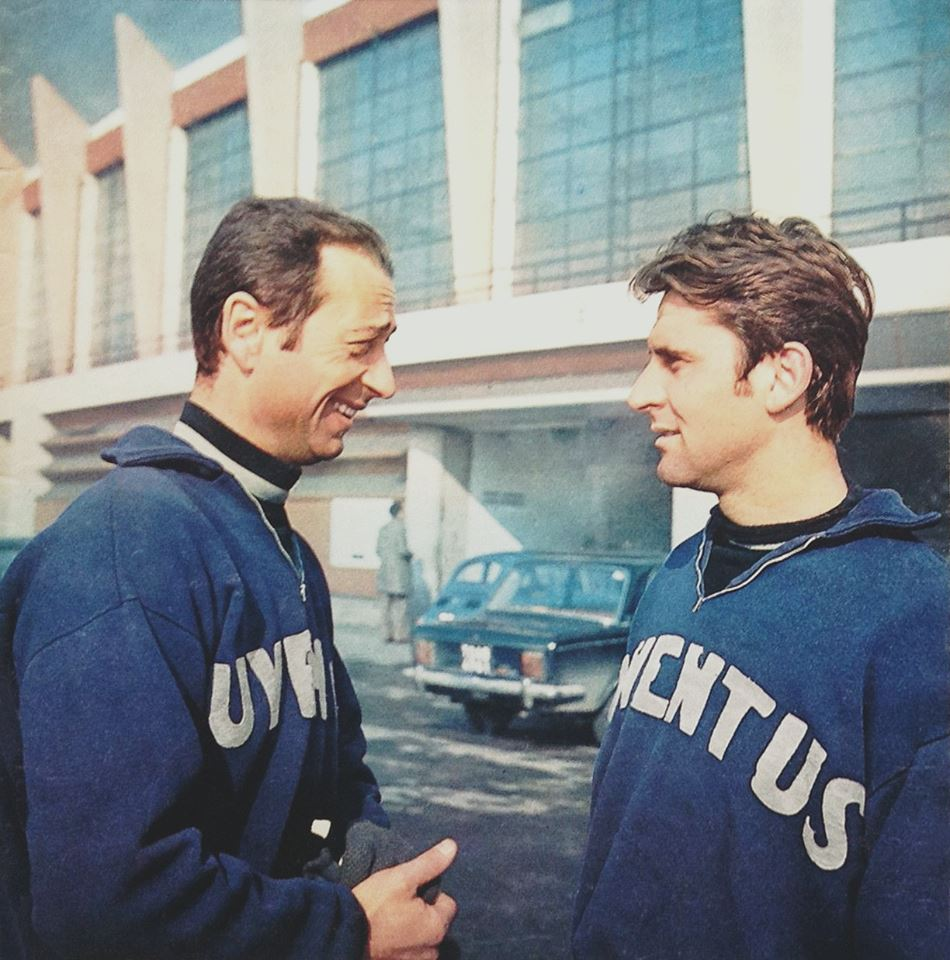
Sarti (left) with Juventus in the 1968–69 season, in a break workout with his teammate Roberto Anzolin.

He was also known for revolutionising the role of the goalkeeper in Italy, functioning as a "sweeper keeper", due to his tendency to rush off his line to anticipate opposing strikers, or to be involved in the build-up of plays by coming out of his area to receive or play the ball out to his defenders. In one on one situations, however, he usually preferred to remain closer to his line and position himself with his body constantly facing the shooter, in order to increase the distance between himself and his opponent, giving him more time to parry the ball; this playing style, which was later described as "geometric" rather than "reactive" by Sarti, was considered unusual for the time, but very effective.

== After retirement ==
Sarti retired from professional football in 1969, after one season with Juventus. After retiring, he also worked as a manager for Lucchese.

== Death ==
Sarti died in Florence on 5 June 2017, at the age of 83, after a sudden illness.

== Honours ==
Fiorentina

- Serie A: 1955–56
- Coppa Italia: 1960–61
- UEFA Cup Winners' Cup: 1960–61

Inter

- Serie A: 1964–65, 1965–66
- European Cup: 1963–64, 1964–65
- Intercontinental Cup: 1964, 1965

Individual

- ACF Fiorentina Hall of Fame: 2013
