= Maurilio Prini =

Italian footballer (1932–2009)

Personal information
- Full name: Maurilio Prini
- Date of birth: 17 August 1932
- Place of birth: Le Sieci, Italy
- Date of death: 29 April 2009 (aged 76)
- Place of death: Florence, Italy
- Position: Forward

Senior career*
Years	Team	Apps	(Gls)
1949–1950	Pontassieve	?	(?)
1950–1952	Empoli	42	(17)
1952–1958	Fiorentina	65	(9)
1958–1962	Lazio	69	(7)
1962–1964	Prato	24	(0)

International career
1956–1957	Italy	3	(0)
- * Club domestic league appearances and goals

Maurilio Prini (Italian pronunciation: [mauˈriːljo ˈpriːni]; 17 August 1932 – 29 April 2009) was an Italian footballer who played as a forward. He represented the Italy national football team three times, the first being on 24 June 1956, on the occasion of a friendly match against Argentina in a 1–0 away loss.

== Honours ==
=== Player ===
Fiorentina

- Serie A: 1955–56

Lazio

- Coppa Italia: 1958

Prato

- Serie C: 1962–63

Individual

- ACF Fiorentina Hall of Fame: 2024
