= 1956–57 Serie A =

54th season of top-tier Italian football

Serie A
- Season: 1956–57
- Champions: Milan; 6th title
- Relegated: Triestina; Palermo
- European Cup: Milan
- Matches: 306
- Goals: 845 (2.76 per match)
- Top goalscorer: Dino da Costa (22 goals)

Serie A 1956-57 team distribution

The 1956–57 Serie A season was won by Milan.

== Teams ==
Udinese and Palermo had been promoted from Serie B.

== Final classification ==
| Pos | Team | Pld | W | D | L | GF | GA | GD | Pts | Qualification or relegation |
|---|---|---|---|---|---|---|---|---|---|---|
| 1 | Milan (C) | 34 | 21 | 6 | 7 | 65 | 40 | +25 | 48 | Qualification to European Cup and for the Latin Cup |
| 2 | Fiorentina | 34 | 16 | 10 | 8 | 55 | 40 | +15 | 42 | |
| 3 | Lazio | 34 | 14 | 13 | 7 | 52 | 40 | +12 | 41 | |
| 4 | Udinese | 34 | 15 | 6 | 13 | 59 | 58 | +1 | 36 | |
| 5 | Internazionale | 34 | 11 | 13 | 10 | 53 | 45 | +8 | 35 | |
| 5 | Bologna | 34 | 12 | 11 | 11 | 54 | 48 | +6 | 35 | |
| 5 | Torino | 34 | 13 | 9 | 12 | 45 | 42 | +3 | 35 | |
| 5 | Sampdoria | 34 | 12 | 11 | 11 | 59 | 56 | +3 | 35 | |
| 9 | Juventus | 34 | 11 | 11 | 12 | 54 | 54 | 0 | 33 | |
| 9 | SPAL | 34 | 14 | 5 | 15 | 38 | 47 | −9 | 33 | |
| 11 | Vicenza | 34 | 11 | 10 | 13 | 49 | 51 | −2 | 32 | |
| 11 | Napoli | 34 | 11 | 10 | 13 | 39 | 41 | −2 | 32 | |
| 11 | Padova | 34 | 8 | 16 | 10 | 33 | 39 | −6 | 32 | |
| 14 | Roma | 34 | 10 | 11 | 13 | 53 | 49 | +4 | 31 | |
| 14 | Atalanta | 34 | 9 | 13 | 12 | 36 | 44 | −8 | 31 | |
| 16 | Genoa | 34 | 9 | 12 | 13 | 36 | 46 | −10 | 30 | |
| 17 | Triestina (R) | 34 | 9 | 11 | 14 | 33 | 42 | −9 | 29 | Relegation to Serie B |
| 18 | Palermo (R) | 34 | 7 | 8 | 19 | 32 | 63 | −31 | 22 | Relegation to Serie B |

Source: Panini
(C) Champions; (R) Relegated

== Results ==
| Home \ Away | ATA | BOL | FIO | GEN | INT | JUV | LRV | LAZ | MIL | NAP | PAD | PAL | ROM | SAM | SPA | TOR | TRI | UDI |
|---|---|---|---|---|---|---|---|---|---|---|---|---|---|---|---|---|---|---|
| Atalanta | | 3–2 | 1–1 | 0–1 | 2–1 | 0–0 | 1–1 | 0–1 | 2–2 | 2–0 | 0–0 | 1–0 | 4–1 | 3–3 | 1–0 | 0–1 | 3–1 | 1–1 |
| Bologna | 1–0 | | 2–2 | 3–1 | 3–2 | 1–0 | 1–1 | 3–1 | 1–2 | 2–1 | 1–2 | 1–1 | 1–0 | 4–2 | 3–0 | 0–0 | 0–0 | 4–3 |
| Fiorentina | 0–1 | 2–1 | | 1–0 | 3–1 | 2–2 | 2–1 | 0–0 | 0–3 | 4–0 | 3–0 | 3–1 | 2–2 | 3–0 | 2–0 | 1–0 | 3–0 | 2–1 |
| Genoa | 2–1 | 5–2 | 1–2 | | 0–0 | 1–1 | 0–0 | 1–1 | 0–1 | 1–0 | 1–1 | 2–2 | 1–1 | 1–1 | 2–1 | 1–0 | 0–1 | 1–1 |
| Internazionale | 2–2 | 2–2 | 2–1 | 2–0 | | 1–1 | 3–1 | 0–1 | 1–1 | 3–1 | 2–0 | 1–0 | 3–2 | 6–1 | 2–0 | 3–0 | 1–0 | 2–3 |
| Juventus | 2–2 | 3–1 | 1–1 | 2–0 | 5–1 | | 0–1 | 3–3 | 0–1 | 1–0 | 0–0 | 6–4 | 1–2 | 1–1 | 2–0 | 1–1 | 4–3 | 2–3 |
| Vicenza | 2–0 | 2–1 | 4–0 | 0–1 | 2–1 | 1–1 | | 1–1 | 3–1 | 0–0 | 0–0 | 4–1 | 1–0 | 3–2 | 4–1 | 1–2 | 3–1 | 1–1 |
| Lazio | 2–2 | 3–2 | 3–0 | 2–2 | 1–1 | 0–3 | 2–0 | | 3–0 | 1–1 | 1–1 | 3–0 | 0–3 | 2–1 | 1–2 | 2–2 | 2–0 | 2–1 |
| Milan | 4–0 | 1–0 | 2–0 | 2–0 | 1–1 | 4–1 | 4–2 | 3–2 | | 3–5 | 2–0 | 1–0 | 3–1 | 2–1 | 0–1 | 3–1 | 2–1 | 2–0 |
| Napoli | 2–0 | 0–0 | 1–1 | 1–2 | 1–1 | 1–2 | 1–0 | 0–0 | 2–2 | | 1–0 | 4–1 | 1–2 | 2–0 | 0–1 | 2–1 | 2–1 | 2–1 |
| Padova | 0–0 | 1–1 | 2–2 | 2–0 | 3–2 | 2–1 | 1–1 | 0–1 | 2–0 | 1–1 | | 1–0 | 0–1 | 2–6 | 1–2 | 1–3 | 1–1 | 4–1 |
| Palermo | 3–1 | 2–1 | 0–1 | 1–0 | 1–1 | 0–2 | 3–1 | 2–6 | 1–2 | 0–0 | 1–1 | | 1–0 | 1–1 | 0–0 | 1–0 | 2–1 | 0–1 |
| Roma | 1–0 | 2–3 | 0–2 | 1–1 | 0–0 | 2–3 | 2–2 | 2–2 | 0–0 | 1–3 | 2–2 | 2–1 | | 5–1 | 5–1 | 0–2 | 3–1 | 6–1 |
| Sampdoria | 2–2 | 1–1 | 2–2 | 3–2 | 2–2 | 2–1 | 5–0 | 0–1 | 3–2 | 1–0 | 2–0 | 6–0 | 1–0 | | 0–3 | 1–0 | 1–1 | 3–0 |
| SPAL | 0–0 | 1–0 | 2–1 | 1–2 | 1–0 | 3–1 | 5–2 | 1–0 | 1–3 | 2–0 | 0–0 | 1–0 | 1–1 | 0–3 | | 2–1 | 0–1 | 1–1 |
| Torino | 2–0 | 1–1 | 2–1 | 2–2 | 1–1 | 4–1 | 2–1 | 0–1 | 2–2 | 1–1 | 0–2 | 5–1 | 1–0 | 0–0 | 3–2 | | 1–0 | 3–1 |
| Triestina | 0–1 | 0–0 | 0–0 | 2–1 | 2–2 | 3–0 | 2–1 | 1–1 | 1–3 | 1–2 | 0–0 | 1–1 | 1–1 | 1–1 | 2–0 | 1–0 | | 1–0 |
| Udinese | 3–0 | 1–5 | 2–5 | 5–1 | 1–0 | 3–0 | 3–2 | 2–0 | 2–1 | 2–1 | 0–0 | 2–0 | 2–2 | 3–0 | 3–2 | 5–1 | 0–1 | |

Source: Almanacco Illustrato del Calcio - La Storia 1898-2004, Panini Edizioni, Modena, September 2005 (in Italian)
Legend: Blue = home team win; Yellow = draw; Red = away team win.

== Top goalscorers ==
| Rank | Player | Club | Goals |
|---|---|---|---|
| 1 | (Brazil) (Italy) Dino da Costa | Roma | 22 |
| 2 | (Italy) Giuseppe Secchi | Udinese | 18 |
| 3 | (Brazil) Luís Vinício | Napoli | 17 |
| 4 | (Italy) Gastone Bean | Milan | 16 |
| 5 | (Sweden) Bengt Lindskog | Udinese | 15 |
| 5 | (Italy) Adriano Bassetto | Atalanta | 15 |
| 7 | (Argentina) (Italy) Miguel Montuori | Fiorentina | 14 |
| 7 | (Italy) Carlo Galli | Milan | 14 |
| 9 | (Sweden) Gunnar Nordahl | Roma | 13 |
| 10 | (Austria) Ernst Ocwirk | Sampdoria | 12 |
| 10 | (Italy) Eddie Firmani | Sampdoria | 12 |
| 10 | (Italy) Gino Armano | Torino | 12 |
| 10 | (Italy) Cesarino Cervellati | Bologna | 12 |
| 10 | (Italy) Amedeo Bonistalli | Padova | 12 |
| 15 | (Sweden) Arne Selmosson | Lazio | 11 |
| 15 | (Italy) Giorgio Stivanello | Juventus | 11 |
| 15 | (Italy) Ezio Pascutti | Bologna | 11 |
| 15 | (Argentina) Santiago Vernazza | Palermo | 11 |

== References and sources ==
- Almanacco Illustrato del Calcio - La Storia 1898-2004, Panini Edizioni, Modena, September 2005
