= Julinho (footballer, born 1929) =

Brazilian footballer (1929-2003)

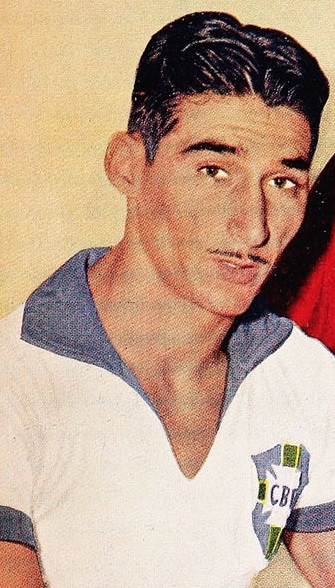
- Júlio Botelho in 1953

Personal information
- Full name: Júlio Botelho
- Date of birth: 29 July 1929
- Place of birth: São Paulo, Brazil
- Date of death: 10 January 2003 (aged 73)
- Place of death: São Paulo, Brazil
- Height: 1.80 m (5 ft 11 in)
- Position: Right winger

Youth career
- 1948–1950: Juventus-SP

Senior career*
Years	Team	Apps	(Gls)
1950–1951	Juventus-SP		
1951–1953	Portuguesa	191	(101)
1954	→ Fluminense (loan)		
1955	Portuguesa		
1955–1958	Fiorentina	89	(22)
1958–1967	Palmeiras	269	(81)

International career
1952–1965	Brazil	24	(11)
- * Club domestic league appearances and goals

Júlio Botelho, also known as Julinho (Brazilian Portuguese: [ʒuˈlĩɲu]; 29 July 1929 – 10 January 2003) was a Brazilian football player. He was primarily a right winger. Known for his dribbling ability and powerful shot, Julinho is regarded as one of the greatest wingers in football history. He was selected by Eric Batty in the World Soccer Magazine world XI in 1960.

== Club career ==
Julinho was born in São Paulo. During his career (1951–1967), he played for Portuguesa, Fluminense and Palmeiras. In Italy, he was a team member of Fiorentina and was a key member of the squad which won the Italian title in 1956. In 1957, he participated in the club's 1957 European Cup Final, a 2–0 loss to Real Madrid.

== International career ==
Julinho played for Brazil at the 1954 FIFA World Cup in Switzerland, scoring two goals. He was also a member of the squad that won the 1952 Panamerican Championship, and that finished runners-up in the 1953 South American Championship and the 1964 Taça das Nações. In total, he made 24 international appearances between 1952 and 1965, scoring 11 goals.

== Style of play ==
Julinho mostly operated on the wings as a right winger and playmaker. A player who was fast, visionary, and skillful at dribbling, Julinho would cut into the middle to shoot or crosses the ball curling in from the flank to assist in goal-scoring chances. Sports writers and football historians rate him as one of the best wingers in Brazil.

== After retirement ==
Julinho was nominated the best player in the history of Fiorentina in 1996.

== Death ==
He died at the age of 73 on 10 January 2003.

== Honours ==
=== Club ===
Portuguesa

- Torneio Rio-São Paulo: 1952, 1955

Fiorentina

- Serie A: 1955–56
- European Cup: Runner-up 1956–57

Palmeiras

- Campeonato Paulista: 1959, 1963
- Campeonato Brasileiro Série A: 1960
- Torneio Rio-São Paulo: 1965
- Copa Libertadores: Runner-up 1961

Brazil

- Panamerican Championship: 1952
- Copa América runner-up: 1953
- Roca Cup: 1960
- Taça das Nações runner-up: 1964

=== Individual ===
- Torneio Rio-São Paulo Team of the Tournament: 1955
- Serie A Team of The Year: 1957
- World Soccer Magazine World XI: 1960
- Brazilian Football Museum Hall of Fame
- Venerdì's 100 Magnifici
- Inducted in ACF Fiorentina Hall of Fame
- IFFHS Brazil All Times Dream Team (Team C): 2021
