= Giuseppe Chiappella =

Italian footballer and manager

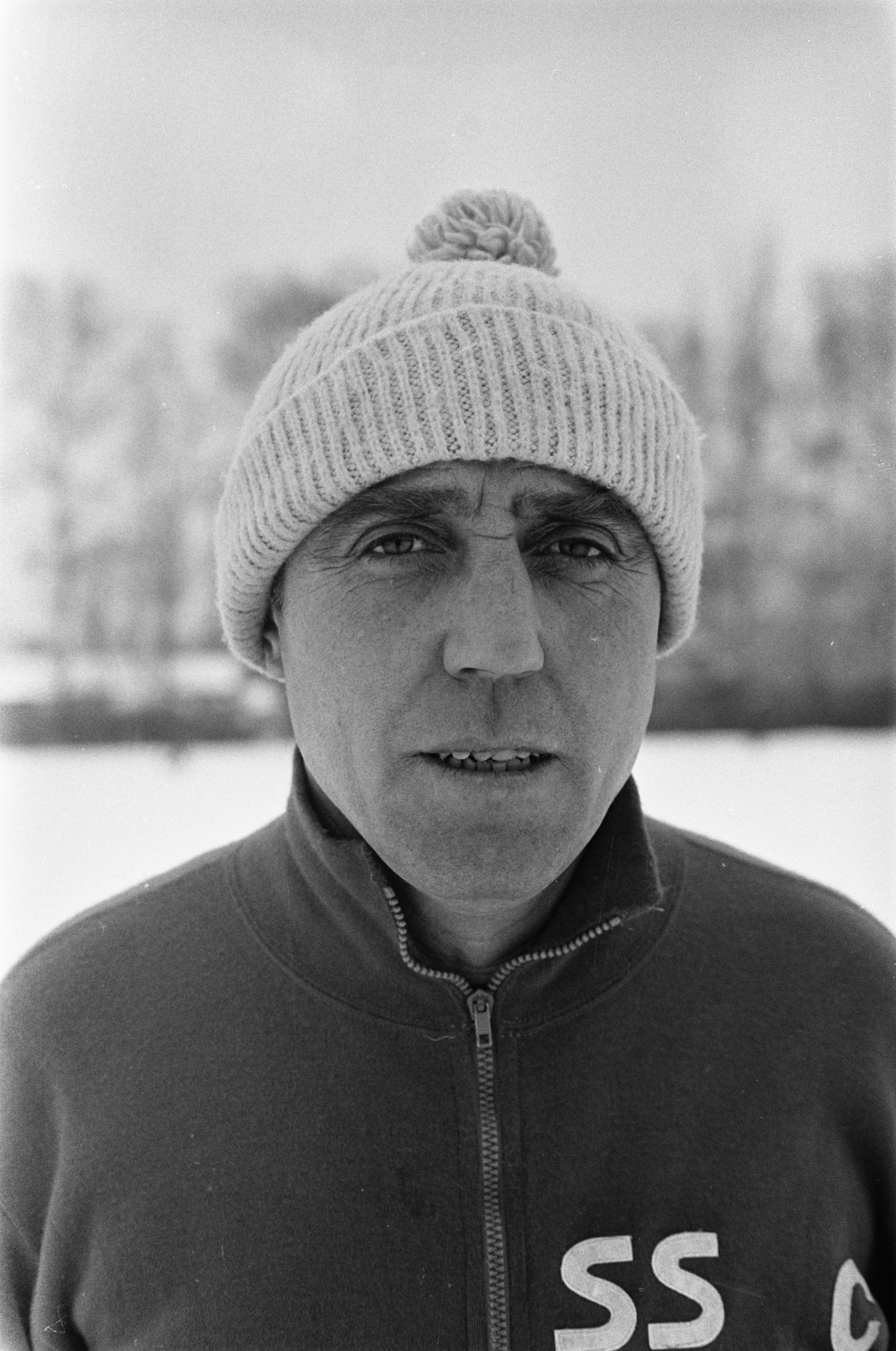
- Chiappella in 1970

Personal information
- Full name: Giuseppe Chiappella
- Date of birth: 28 September 1924
- Place of birth: Milan, Italy
- Date of death: 26 December 2009 (aged 85)
- Place of death: Milan, Italy
- Position: Defensive midfielder

Senior career*
Years	Team	Apps	(Gls)
1942–1943	Redaelli Milano		
1945–1946	Stradellina		
1946–1949	Pisa	97	(4)
1949–1960	Fiorentina	329	(5)

International career
1953–1957	Italy	17	(0)

Managerial career
- 1961–1963: Fiorentina (assistant)
- 1963–1968: Fiorentina
- 1968–1969: Napoli
- 1969–1973: Napoli
- 1973–1974: Cagliari
- 1976–1977: Internazionale
- 1978: Fiorentina
- 1978–1979: Hellas Verona
- 1979–1980: Pisa
- 1981–1982: Pescara
- * Club domestic league appearances and goals

Giuseppe Chiappella (Italian pronunciation: [dʒuˈzɛppe kjapˈpɛlla]; 28 September 1924 – 26 December 2009) was an Italian football midfielder and manager. He played for Redaelli Milano, Stradellina, and Pisa, but is most famous for making over 300 appearances for Fiorentina. He represented Italy at international level in 17 games between 1953 and 1957.

After Chiappella retired from professional football, he went on to management; he was at the helm at some of Italy's top clubs such as Fiorentina, Napoli and Internazionale.

== Honours ==
=== Player ===
Fiorentina

- Serie A: 1955–56

=== Manager ===
Fiorentina

- Coppa Italia: 1965–66
- Mitropa Cup: 1966

=== Individual ===
- ACF Fiorentina Hall of Fame: 2012
