= Miguel Montuori =

Argentine and Italian footballer (1932–1998)

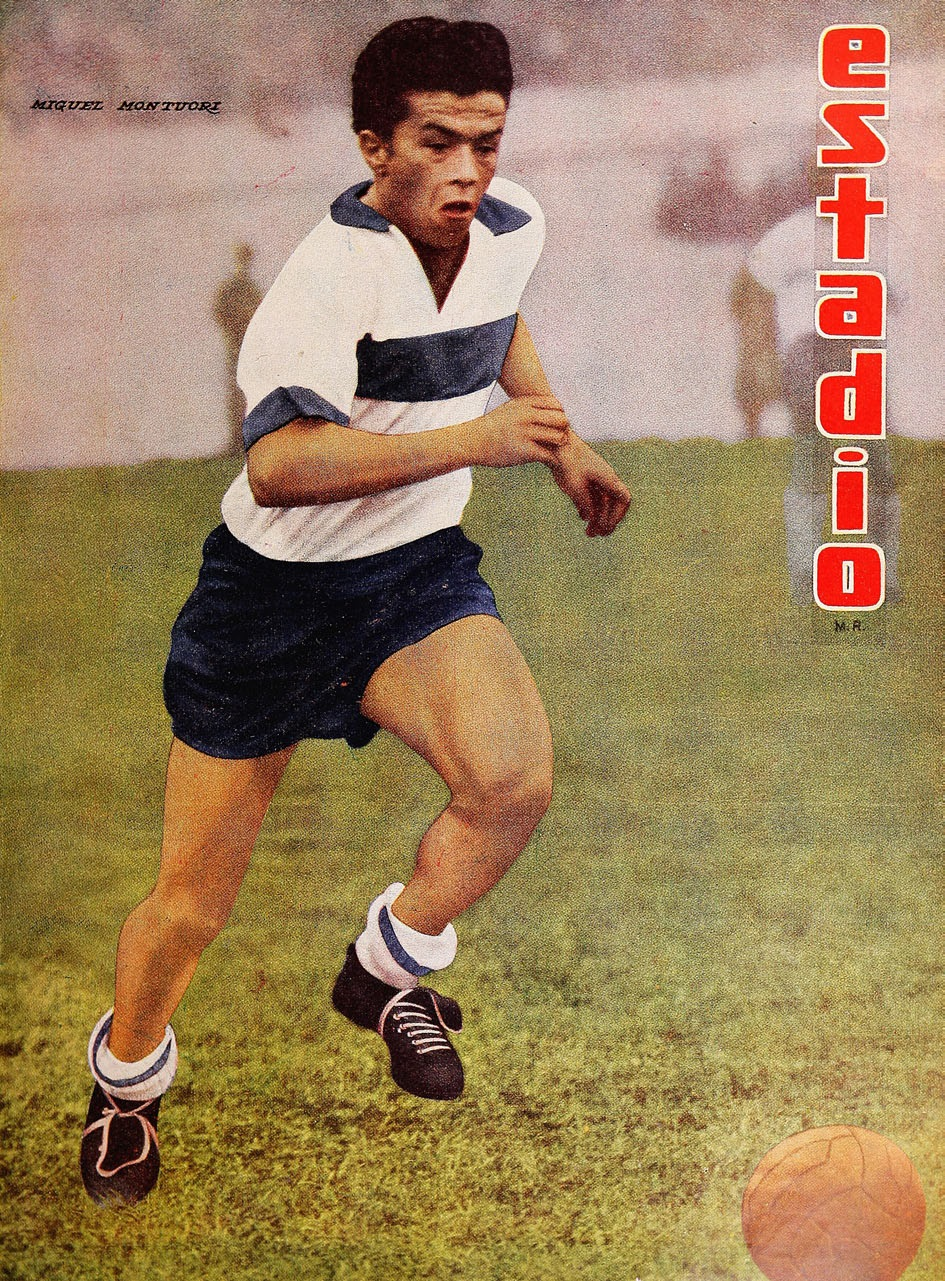
- Montuori with Fiorentina

Personal information
- Full name: Miguel Ángel Montuori
- Date of birth: 24 September 1932
- Place of birth: Rosario, Argentina
- Date of death: 4 June 1998 (aged 65)
- Place of death: Florence, Italy
- Position: Midfielder

Senior career*
Years	Team	Apps	(Gls)
1951–1952	Racing Club		
1953–1955	Universidad Católica	59	(28)
1955–1961	Fiorentina	162	(72)

International career
1955–1960	Italy	12	(2)

Managerial career
- Pontassieve
- Aglianese
- Montecatini
- 1971–1972: Universidad Católica (fitness coach)
- 1972: Rangers
- * Club domestic league appearances and goals

Miguel Ángel Montuori (Spanish: [miˈɣel ˈaŋxel monˈtwoɾi], Italian: [monˈtwɔːri]; 24 September 1932 – 4 June 1998) was an Argentine and Italian footballer who played as a forward or attacking midfielder. He is regarded as one of Fiorentina's greatest players of all time, due to his technique, creativity, eye for goal, and playmaking ability. Despite his talent and success, he was also regarded as an "unfortunate" player, due to his many runner-up medals, and his injuries, which forced him to retire during the prime of his career. Born in Argentina, he played for the Italy national team at international level.

== Life ==
=== Early and personal life ===
Montuori was born in Rosario, Argentina, to a mother of Afro-Argentinian descent and an Italian father of Neapolitan origin.

Besides his sports career, Montuori developed hobbies such as painting and chess, also defeating René Letelier, the Chilean champion at the time.

=== Health and death ===
In 1963, Montuori was operated from an aneurysm. Montuori died from an emphysema in Florence in 1998, and was laid to rest in the Santiago General Cemetery, Chile.

== Career ==
=== Club career ===
Montuori began his career with Racing Club before emigrating to Chile and joining Universidad Católica from Santiago in 1953, winning the Chilean Primera División in 1954, scoring 24 goals in 26 league appearances for the club. He subsequently moved to play with ACF Fiorentina in Italy in the summer of 1955, at the request of club president Enrico Befani, and was handed the number 10 shirt. He played at the club from 1955 to 1961, making 162 Serie A appearances, and scoring 72 goals. In the Coppa Italia he played 13 matches scoring 6 goals, and in the 1956–57 European Cup he played seven games and scored one goal, helping the team to the final. He also played two matches in the Mitropa Cup with Fiorentina.

With Fiorentina, Montuori was able to achieve great domestic and international success, as well as international recognition; upon his arrival at the club, he won the only Italian title of his career, during the 1955–56 season, and he followed this triumph with four consecutive second places. He was also able to win the 1960–61 European Cup Winners' Cup, and the 1960–61 Coppa Italia, also reaching the final of the Italian Cup three consecutive times between 1958 and 1960. He also won several minor international trophies with Fiorentina, such as the Grasshoppers Cup in 1957, the Coppa dell'Amicizia twice, in 1959 and 1960, as well as the Coppa delle Alpi in 1960. Montuori's playing career ended prematurely, at the age of 28, in the spring of 1961. During an away friendly match against Perugia, he was hit strongly in the face by the ball, which caused his retina to detach, and his vision to blur, leading him to retire from professional football.

=== International career ===
Born in Argentina, Montuori represented the Italy national team, making his debut against France in 1956, and making his final appearance against Switzerland in 1960. He also became the first non-Italian born player to captain Italy, wearing the captain's armband in a friendly match against Spain, in Rome, on 28 February 1959. With Italy, he received 12 international caps and scored 2 goals.

=== Post-retirement ===
Following his retirement, Montuori worked as a journalist for Il Mattino.

As a football coach, Montuori led Pontassieve Calcio, Aglianese and Montecatini in Italy. Back to Chile in 1971, he served as a fitness coach for Universidad Católica and coach of Rangers de Talca.

In 1986, Montuori returned to Italy and worked as a football commentator for TV media.

== Honours ==
Universidad Católica

- Chilean Primera División: 1954

Fiorentina

- Serie A: 1955–56
- Coppa Italia: 1960–61
- European Cup Winners' Cup: 1960–61
- Coppa dell'Amicizia: 1958–59, 1959–60
- Coppa delle Alpi: 1959–60

Individual

- Serie A Team of The Year: 1956
- Fiorentina Hall of Fame: 2016
