= Fulvio Bernardini =

Italian footballer and coach

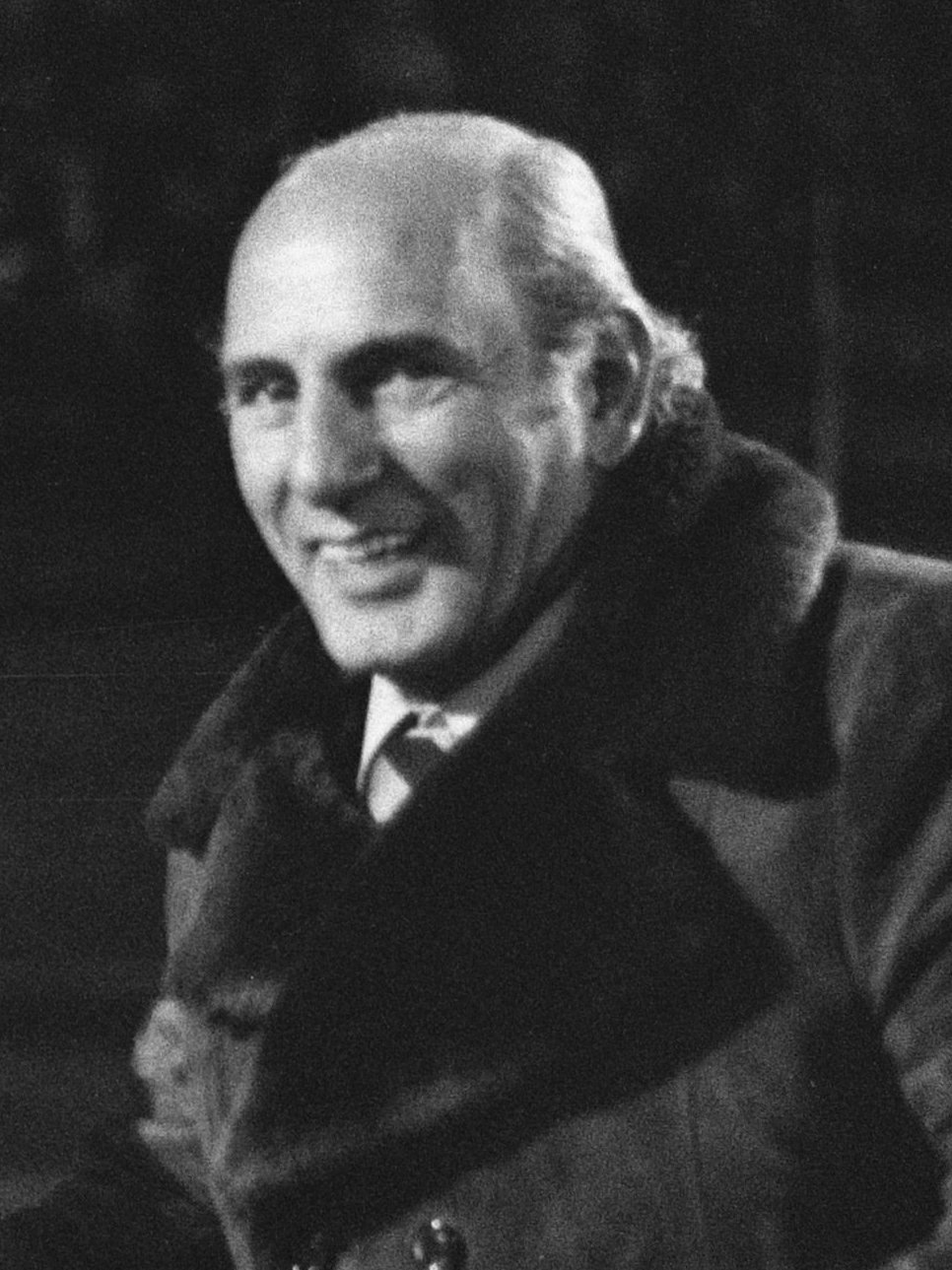
- Bernardini in 1974

Personal information
- Date of birth: 28 December 1905
- Place of birth: Rome, Italy
- Date of death: 13 January 1984 (aged 78)
- Place of death: Rome, Italy
- Position: Midfielder

Senior career*
Years	Team	Apps	(Gls)
1923–1926	Lazio	104	(70)
1926–1928	Inter	68	(25)
1928–1939	Roma	286	(47)
1939–1943	M.A.T.E.R.	117	(23)
Total		575	(208)

International career
1925–1932	Italy	26	(3)

Managerial career
- 1949–1950: Roma
- 1951–1953: Vicenza
- 1953–1958: Fiorentina
- 1958–1960: Lazio
- 1961–1965: Bologna
- 1966–1971: Sampdoria
- 1974–1975: Italy
Medal record
Italy
Summer Olympics
Bronze medal – third place	1928 Amsterdam
Central European International Cup
Gold medal – first place	1927–30 Central European International Cup
Central European International Cup
Silver medal – second place	1931–32 Central European International Cup
- * Club domestic league appearances and goals

Fulvio Bernardini (Italian pronunciation: [ˈfulvjo bernarˈdiːni]; 28 December 1905 (Note: According to some sources, he was born on 1 January 1906.) – 13 January 1984) was an Italian football player and coach who played as a midfielder. He is regarded as one of Italy's greatest ever footballers and managers.

== Club career ==
During his playing career, Bernardini played for Lazio, Inter, Roma and M.A.T.E.R. at club level.

== International career ==
At international level, Bernardini was also a member of the Italy national football team that won the bronze medal in the football tournament at the 1928 Summer Olympics.

== Managerial career ==
Following his playing career, Bernardini worked as a manager, and coached Roma, Vicenza, Fiorentina (winning the Italian championship during the 1955–56 Serie A season), Lazio (winning the Coppa Italia during the 1957–58 season), Bologna (winning the Italian championship during the 1963–64 Serie A season), Sampdoria before going on to coach the Italy national team from 1974 to 1975.

== Personal life ==
Bernardini was born and died in Rome.

He is one of the members of the A.S. Roma Hall of Fame.

== Managerial statistics ==
As of 12 May 2026

Managerial record by team and tenure
Team	Nat.	From	To	Record								Ref
Team	Nat.	From	To	G	W	D	L	GF	GA	GD	Win %	Ref
AS Roma	(Italy)	1 June 1949	30 June 1950	38	12	7	19	52	70	−18	31.58	
Vicenza	(Italy)	1 June 1951	30 June 1953	72	23	24	25	85	83	+2	31.94	
ACF Fiorentina	(Italy)	1 July 1953	30 June 1958	183	90	62	31	290	180	+110	49.18	
Lazio	(Italy)	1 July 1958	30 June 1960	73	22	22	29	77	106	−29	30.14	
Career total				366	147	115	104	504	439	+65	40.16	—

== Honours ==
=== Player ===
Italy

- Summer Olympics: Bronze Medal 1928
- Central European International Cup: 1927–30; Runner-up: 1931–32

=== Manager ===
Fiorentina

- Serie A: 1955–56

Lazio

- Coppa Italia: 1957–58

Bologna

- Serie A: 1963–64

=== Individual ===
- Capocannoniere: 1922–23 (21 goals),
- Seminatore d'Oro: 1955–56
- Italian Football Hall of Fame: 2011
- A.S. Roma Hall of Fame: 2012
- ACF Fiorentina Hall of Fame: 2012
