= Giuseppe Virgili =

Italian footballer (1935–2016)

Personal information
- Date of birth: 24 July 1935
- Place of birth: Udine, Italy
- Date of death: 10 June 2016 (aged 80)
- Place of death: Florence, Italy
- Position: Forward

Senior career*
| Years | Team | Apps | (Gls) |
| 1952–1954 | Udinese | 35 | (9) |
| 1954–1958 | Fiorentina | 101 | (55) |
| 1958–1960 | Torino | 56 | (30) |
| 1960–1962 | Bari | 35 | (9) |
| 1962–1965 | Livorno | 71 | (25) |
| 1965–1966 | Taranto | 6 | (0) |
| Total | | 304 | (128) |

International career
| 1955–1957 | Italy | 7 | (2) |
- * Club domestic league appearances and goals

Giuseppe Virgili (Italian pronunciation: [dʒuˈzɛppe virˈdʒiːli]; 24 July 1935 – 10 June 2016) was an Italian footballer who played as a forward.

== Club career ==
Born in Udine, Virgili played for Udinese, Fiorentina, Torino, Bari, Livorno and Taranto at club level.

== International career ==
Virgili also scored two goals in seven appearances for the national team between 1955 and 1957.

== Later life and death ==
Virgili died in hospital at the age of 80, following an illness. He was inducted into the Fiorentina Hall of Fame in 2013.
