= 1955–56 Serie A =

53rd season of top-tier Italian football

Serie A
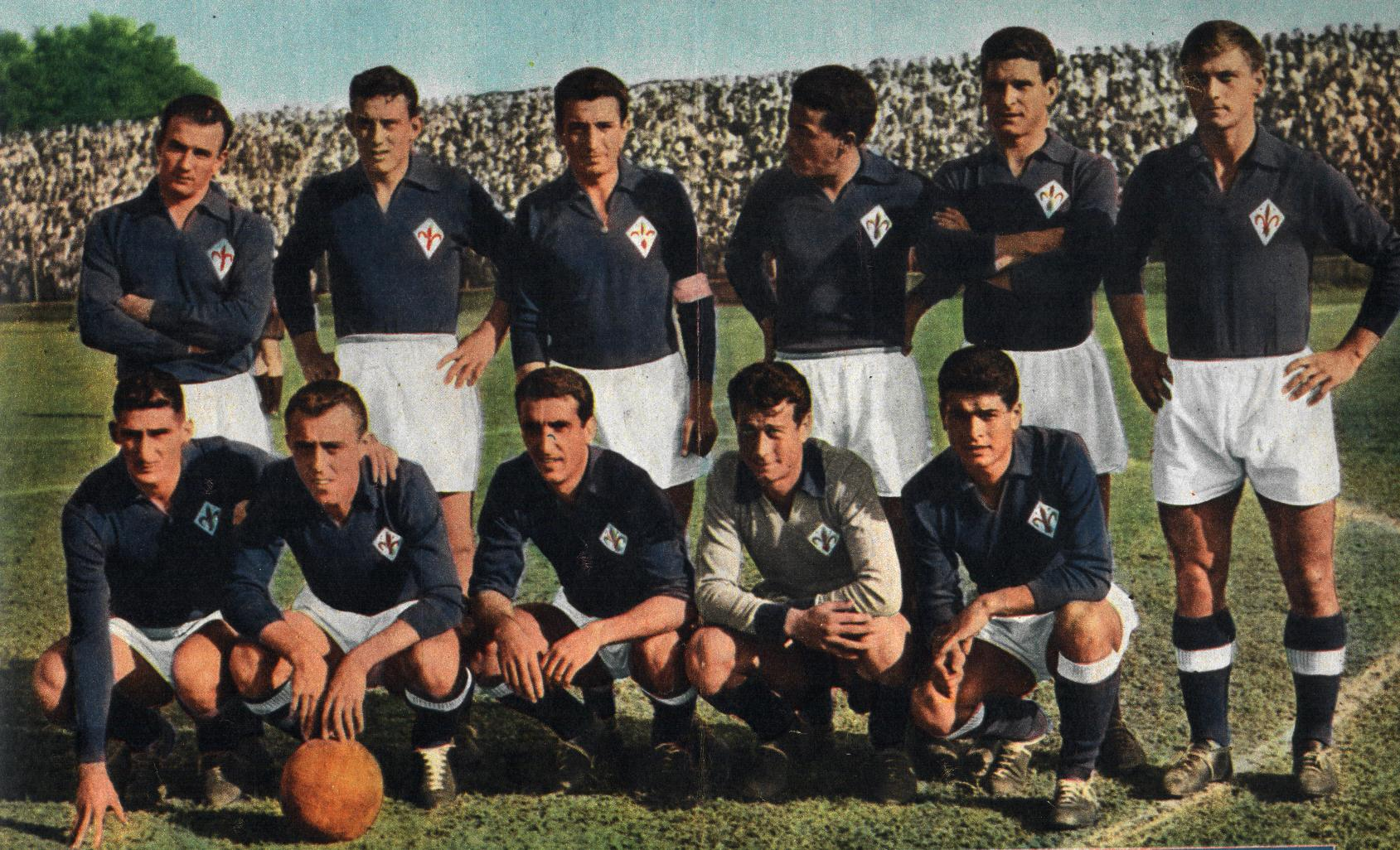
- 1955–56 Fiorentina team
- Season: 1955–56
- Champions: Fiorentina; 1st title
- Relegated: Novara; Pro Patria
- European Cup: Fiorentina
- Matches played: 306
- Goals scored: 838 (2.74 per match)
- Top goalscorer: Gino Pivatelli (29 goals)

The 1955-56 Serie A was the fifty-fourth edition of the Italian Football Championship. It was the twenty-third Italian Football Championship branded Serie A, since Serie A was launched in 1929. This was the thirtieth season from which the Italian Football Champions adorned their team jerseys in the subsequent season with a Scudetto. Fiorentina were champions for the first time in their history. This was thus their second scudetto since the scudetto started being awarded in 1924, and their first win contested as Serie A.

== Teams ==
Vicenza and Padova had been promoted from Serie B.

Serie A 1955-56 team distribution

== Final classification ==
Pos	Team	Pld	W	D	L	GF	GA	GD	Pts	Qualification or relegation
1	Fiorentina (C)	34	20	13	1	59	20	+39	53	Qualification for the European Cup preliminary round
2	Milan	34	16	9	9	70	48	+22	41	Qualified for the 1956 Latin Cup
3	Internazionale	34	16	7	11	57	36	+21	39	
3	Lazio	34	14	11	9	54	46	+8	39	
5	Bologna	34	15	7	12	68	52	+16	37	
6	Roma	34	11	13	10	43	40	+3	35	
6	Sampdoria	34	12	11	11	51	54	−3	35	
8	Padova	34	14	6	14	41	43	−2	34	
9	SPAL	34	10	13	11	40	39	+1	33	
9	Genoa	34	12	9	13	50	52	−2	33	
9	Torino	34	12	9	13	43	45	−2	33	
9	Juventus	34	8	17	9	32	37	−5	33	
9	Vicenza	34	10	13	11	31	40	−9	33	
14	Napoli	34	10	12	12	46	49	−3	32	
15	Atalanta	34	11	9	14	50	55	−5	31	
16	Triestina	34	10	10	14	27	44	−17	30	
17	Novara (R)	34	8	10	16	45	51	−6	26	Relegation to Serie B
18	Pro Patria (R)	34	3	9	22	31	87	−56	15	Relegation to Serie B

Source: Panini
(C) Champions; (R) Relegated

== Results ==
Home \ Away	ATA	BOL	FIO	GEN	INT	JUV	LRV	LAZ	MIL	NAP	NOV	PAD	PPA	ROM	SAM	SPA	TOR	TRI
Atalanta		1–0	0–0	2–2	1–1	1–1	3–0	1–1	4–3	1–2	2–1	0–2	4–1	1–1	4–1	4–3	1–2	2–0
Bologna	1–0		0–2	4–1	2–3	0–1	1–1	0–2	2–1	3–1	3–2	3–1	6–1	1–0	5–2	2–2	6–1	3–1
Fiorentina	4–1	0–0		3–1	0–0	2–0	2–0	4–1	3–0	0–0	4–2	1–0	4–1	2–0	0–0	0–0	2–0	1–0
Genoa	2–1	2–1	3–1		4–3	0–0	2–2	3–3	3–1	3–1	2–0	0–0	3–0	3–3	2–1	1–1	3–1	1–0
Internazionale	1–2	0–3	1–3	3–0		0–2	1–0	2–3	2–1	3–0	2–0	0–1	4–0	1–1	7–1	3–1	1–0	0–0
Juventus	2–1	2–2	0–4	1–0	1–0		0–0	1–0	0–0	0–1	2–2	3–0	3–1	0–0	2–2	2–2	0–2	0–1
Vicenza	1–0	2–3	1–1	2–1	0–2	3–2		0–1	1–3	0–0	0–0	0–0	1–1	2–0	0–0	2–0	1–0	1–1
Lazio	2–2	2–2	2–2	2–0	2–2	2–0	1–3		2–3	1–1	2–0	3–1	2–0	1–0	1–2	3–0	0–1	1–1
Milan	4–1	3–0	0–2	3–2	1–2	3–1	0–0	1–3		0–0	4–2	4–1	3–3	4–1	6–1	2–0	3–1	1–0
Napoli	0–3	3–3	2–4	2–1	0–2	1–1	0–0	1–2	2–0		0–2	1–0	8–1	1–1	3–1	2–2	2–2	3–2
Novara	2–1	2–0	1–1	1–2	2–2	0–0	2–0	6–2	3–4	1–0		3–0	2–1	2–2	1–2	1–1	1–2	0–1
Padova	5–1	3–1	0–1	2–1	1–0	1–1	3–1	1–2	1–5	1–1	2–1		2–1	2–0	1–3	0–0	2–0	4–0
Pro Patria	2–0	2–2	2–2	1–0	0–4	2–2	0–1	1–2	1–1	0–0	0–0	0–2		3–5	2–0	1–2	1–1	1–4
Roma	3–2	2–0	1–1	2–0	1–0	1–1	4–1	0–0	0–0	2–1	2–1	1–1	1–0		1–2	1–1	2–1	4–1
Sampdoria	4–0	2–5	0–0	0–0	3–2	2–0	1–3	1–1	2–2	3–0	1–1	0–1	7–0	1–0		3–1	0–0	1–0
SPAL	0–0	2–1	0–1	1–0	0–1	0–0	5–0	1–0	0–0	1–2	2–0	2–0	2–1	1–0	1–1		1–2	4–0
Torino	1–3	1–0	0–1	2–2	0–2	0–0	0–0	2–2	1–1	1–4	2–1	2–0	6–0	2–1	2–1	0–0		5–0
Triestina	0–0	1–3	1–1	2–0	0–0	1–1	0–2	1–0	1–3	2–1	0–0	1–0	1–0	0–0	0–0	3–1	1–0	

Source: Almanacco Illustrato del Calcio - La Storia 1898-2004, Panini Edizioni, Modena, September 2005 (in Italian)
Legend: Blue = home team win; Yellow = draw; Red = away team win.

== Top goalscorers ==
Rank	Player	Club	Goals
1	(Italy) Gino Pivatelli	Bologna	29
2	(Sweden) Gunnar Nordahl	Milan	23
3	(Italy) Giuseppe Virgili	Fiorentina	20
4	(Italy) Adriano Bassetto	Atalanta	18
5	(Italy) Eddie Firmani	Sampdoria	17
6	(Brazil) Luís Vinício	Napoli	16
6	(Uruguay) (Italy) Juan Alberto Schiaffino	Milan	16
8	(Italy) Attilio Frizzi	Genoa	14
9	(Argentina) (Italy) Miguel Montuori	Fiorentina	13
9	(Italy) Mario Tortul	Sampdoria	13
11	(Brazil) (Italy) Dino da Costa	Roma	12
11	(Italy) Lorenzo Bettini	Lazio	12
11	(Italy) Amedeo Bonistalli	Padova	12
14	(Sweden) Lennart Skoglund	Internazionale	11
14	(Italy) Riccardo Carapellese	Genoa	11
14	(Italy) Giorgio Dal Monte	Milan	11
14	(Italy) Ezio Pascutti	Bologna	11

== References and sources ==
- Almanacco Illustrato del Calcio - La Storia 1898-2004, Panini Edizioni, Modena, September 2005
