= 1953–54 Inter Milan season =

Inter Milan
1953–54 season
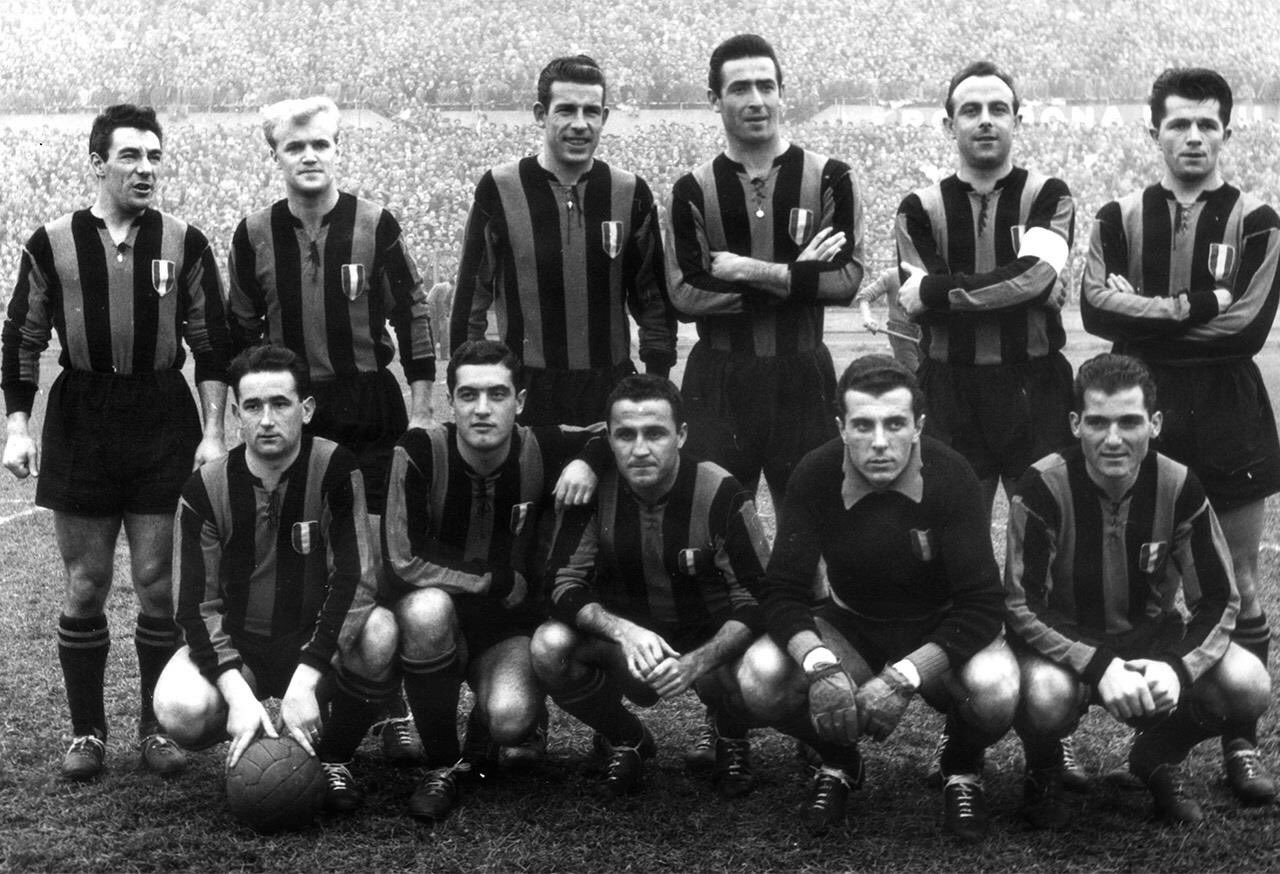
- Chairman: Carlo Masseroni
- Manager: Alfredo Foni
- Serie A: 1st
- Top goalscorer: League: Armano (13); All: Armano (13)
Home colours	Away colours
- All statistics correct as of 30 May 1954.

In the 1953–54 season, Inter Milan competed in the domestic league as the defending champion.

== Summary ==
Inter started the season without Nyers, cut off from the club following a debate with chairman Masseroni about his salary. However, this did not seem to encumber play, resulting in a better season than the previous year. Nyers came back just before the Derby della Madonnina, and won 3–0 by his hat-trick. Six months later in the Derby d'Italia, Inter beat Juventus 6–0, which was crucial for the conquest of another Scudetto, leaving Juventus one point shy.

== Squad ==
The roles of the players are in brackets.

- (Italy) Gino Armano (winger)
- (Italy) Ivano Blason (full back)
- (Italy) Sergio Brighenti (centre forward)
- (Italy) Pietro Broccini (midfielder)
- (Italy) Sebastiano Buzzin (midfielder)
- (Italy) Osvaldo Fattori (midfielder)
- (Italy) Giorgio Ghezzi (goalkeeper)
- (Italy) Giovanni Giacomazzi (centre back)
- (Italy) Attilio Giovannini (half back)
- (Italy) Lino Grava (full back)
- (Italy) Benito Lorenzi (centre forward)
- (Italy) Bruno Mazza (midfielder)
- (Italy) Lido Mazzoni (winger)
- (Italy) Sergio Morin (midfielder)
- (Italy) Maino Neri (midfielder)
- (Italy) Fulvio Nesti (midfielder)
- (Hungary) István Nyers (centre forward)
- (Italy) Bruno Padulazzi (full back)
- (Sweden) Lennart Skoglund (playmaker)
- (Italy) Guido Vincenzi (full back)
- (Italy) Luigi Zambaiti (centre forward)

== Competitions ==
=== Serie A ===
==== League table ====
Pos	Team	Pld	W	D	L	GF	GA	GD	Pts	Qualification or relegation
1	Internazionale (C)	34	20	11	3	67	32	+35	51	
2	Juventus	34	20	10	4	58	34	+24	50	
3	Milan	34	17	10	7	66	39	+27	44	
3	Fiorentina	34	15	14	5	45	27	+18	44	
5	Napoli	34	13	12	9	52	38	+14	38	

Source: Panini
(C) Champions

==== Matches ====
13 September 1953 1	Inter Milan	2–0	Lazio	Milan
	Lorenzi 25'; Skoglund 89'	Report		Stadium: Stadio San Siro; Referee: Renzo Massai

20 September 1953 2	Atalanta	0–2	Inter Milan	Bergamo
		Report	61' Armano; 79' Brighenti II	Stadium: Comunale; Referee: Riccardo Pieri

27 September 1953 3	Inter Milan	4–2	SPAL	Milan
	Buzzin 10'; Skoglund 16'; Lorenzi 37'; Brighenti II 40'	Report	39' Stefanini; 64' Bulent	Stadium: Stadio San Siro; Referee: Mario Maurelli

4 October 1953 4	Legnano	1–1	Inter Milan	Legnano
	Manzardo 14'	Report	60' Buzzin	Stadium: Stadio Comunale; Referee: Vincenzo Orlandini

11 October 1953 5	Inter Milan	2–1	Fiorentina	Milan
	Skoglund 24', 76'	Report	70' Gren	Stadium: Stadio San Siro; Referee: Francesco Liverani

18 October 1953 6	Inter Milan	3–2	Bologna	Milan
	Armano 15', 59' (pen.); Pozzan 37' (o.g.)	Report	20' Cappello; 29' Pivatelli	Stadium: San Siro; Referee: Iginio Rigato

25 October 1953 7	Roma	1–1	Inter Milan	Rome
	Galli 27'	Report	62' Lorenzi	Stadium: Stadio Olimpico; Referee: Cesare Jonni

1 November 1953 8	Inter Milan	3–0	AC Milan	Milan
	Nyers 50', 54', 73'	Report		Stadium: Stadio San Siro; Referee: Guido Agnolin

8 November 1953 9	Sampdoria	0–0	Inter Milan	Genoa
		Report		Stadium: Stadio Luigi Ferraris; Referee: Vincenzo Orlandini

22 November 1953 10	Juventus	2–2	Inter Milan	Turin
	Boniperti 31'; J. Hansen 54'	Report	4' Skoglund; 24' Nyers	Stadium: Comunale; Referee: Renzo Massai

29 November 1953 11	Inter Milan	2–0	Napoli	Milan
	Mazza 59'; Nyers 89'	Report		Stadium: Stadio San Siro; Referee: Riccardo Pieri

6 December 1953 12	Inter Milan	0–2	Udinese	Milan
		Report	3' Pløger; 48' Szoke	Stadium: San Siro; Referee: Gennaro Marchese

20 December 1953 13	Novara	2–3	Inter Milan	Novara
	Savioni 8'; Piola 43' (pen.)	Report	30' Brighenti II; 40' Lorenzi; 41' Armano	Stadium: Comunale; Referee: Renzo Massai

27 December 1953 14	Inter Milan	1–0	Genoa	Milan
	Fattori 26'	Report		Stadium: San Siro; Referee: Ugo Scaramella

3 January 1954 15	Inter Milan	4–0	Palermo	Milan
	Brighenti II 17', 24', 71'; Armano 68'	Report		Stadium: Stadio San Siro; Referee: Iginio Rigato

10 January 1954 16	Torino	1–1	Inter Milan	Turin
	Buhtz 68'	Report	8' Mazza	Stadium: Stadio Filadelfia; Referee: Guido Agnolin

17 January 1954 17	Triestina	0–0	Inter Milan	Trieste
		Report		Stadium: Stadio Giuseppe Grezar; Referee: Cesare Jonni

31 January 1954 18	Lazio	0–1	Inter Milan	Rome
		Report	41' Armano	Stadium: Stadio Olimpico; Referee: Riccardo Pieri

7 February 1954 19	Inter Milan	3–1	Atalanta	Milan
	Nesti 18'; Armano 30'; Brighenti II 75'	Report	78' Rasmussen	Stadium: San Siro; Referee: Mario Maurelli

14 February 1954 20	SPAL	2–2	Inter Milan	Ferrara
	Castoldi 52'; Sega 69'	Report	15', 20' Buzzin	Stadium: Stadio Comunale; Referee: Renzo Massai

21 February 1954 21	Inter Milan	2–2	Legnano	Milan
	Armano 27'; Lupi 42' (o.g.)	Report	21' Eidefjäll; 40' Palmer	Stadium: Stadio San Siro; Referee: Iginio Rigato

28 February 1954 22	Fiorentina	1–1	Inter Milan	Florence
	Cervato 21' (pen.)	Report	88' Buzzin	Stadium: Comunale; Referee: Cesare Jonni

7 March 1954 23	Bologna	0–1	Inter Milan	Bologna
		Report	70' Lorenzi	Stadium: Stadio Renato Dall'Ara; Referee: Renzo Massai

14 March 1954 24	Inter Milan	1–1	Roma	Milan
	Lorenzi 35'	Report	13' Bettini	Stadium: San Siro; Referee: Cesare Jonni

21 March 1954 25	AC Milan	2–0	Inter Milan	Milan
	Nordahl 34'; Sørensen 74'	Report		Stadium: Stadio San Siro; Referee: Vincenzo Orlandini

28 March 1954 26	Inter Milan	2–1	Sampdoria	Milan
	Armano 3'; Skoglund 81'	Report	90' Tortul	Stadium: Stadio San Siro; Referee: Diego De Leo

4 April 1954 27	Inter Milan	6–0	Juventus	Milan
	Skoglund 7', 79'; Armano 30'; Brighenti II 66', 83'; Nesti 84'	Report		Stadium: San Siro; Referee: Cesare Jonni

18 April 1954 28	Napoli	2–1	Inter Milan	Naples
	Ciccarelli 12', 80'	Report	16' Armano	Stadium: del Vomero; Referee: Riccardo Pieri

25 April 1954 29	Udinese	0–2	Inter Milan	Udine
		Report	60' Lorenzi; 68' Fattori	Stadium: Stadio Moretti; Referee: Cesare Jonni

2 May 1954 30	Inter Milan	3–1	Novara	Milan
	Armano 2' (pen.); Lorenzi 4'; Vincenzi 38'	Report	13' Renica	Stadium: San Siro; Referee: Diego De Leo

9 May 1954 31	Genoa	1–3	Inter Milan	Genoa
	Pravisano 85'	Report	9', 71' Lorenzi; 70' Nyers	Stadium: Stadio Luigi Ferraris; Referee: Cesare Jonni

16 May 1954 32	Palermo	2–2	Inter Milan	Palermo
	Cavazzuti 30', 62'	Report	3' Mazza; 38' Skoglund	Stadium: La Favorita; Referee: Mario Maurelli

23 May 1954 33	Inter Milan	2–0	Torino	Milan
	Lorenzi 29'; Armano 36'	Report		Stadium: San Siro; Referee: Diego De Leo

30 May 1954 34	Inter Milan	4–2	Triestina	Milan
	Lorenzi 5'; Nyers 11', 38'; Skoglund 81'	Report	28' Secchi; 86' Rossetti	Stadium: San Siro; Referee: Guido Agnolin

== Statistics ==
=== Squad statistics ===
Overall								Home						Away					
Pld	W	D	L	GF	GA	GD	Pts	W	D	L	GF	GA	GD	W	D	L	GF	GA	GD
34	20	11	3	67	32	+35	71	14	2	1	43	15	+28	6	9	2	24	17	+7

Last updated: 30 May 1954.

2 points were awarded for every win, so Inter collected 51 points instead 61.

=== Players statistics ===
Appearances and goals are referred to domestic league:

Ghezzi (34/−32); Armano (33/13); Neri (32); Giacomazzi (29); Nesti (29/2); Lorenzi (28/12); Mazza (27/3); Skoglund (27/10); Giovannini (25); Padulazzi (25); Fattori (20/2); Vincenzi (18/1); Brighenti (15/9); Nyers (14/8); Buzzin (12/5); Broccini (4); Blason (1); Zambaiti (1).

== See also ==
- Inter Milan
