= 1952–53 Inter Milan season =

Inter Milan
1952–53 season
- Chairman: Carlo Masseroni
- Manager: Alfredo Foni
- Serie A: 1st
- Top goalscorer: League: Nyers (15); All: Nyers (15)
Home colours
- All statistics correct as of 31 May 1953.

== Season ==
The chairman Carlo Masseroni appointed manager Alfredo Foni, who had coached the national team from 1936 to 1942. He set up a revolution, later known as catenaccio referring to the use of play in defence. The goalkeeper Giorgio Ghezzi was covered by Blason, Giacomazzi, Nesti, Giovannini and Neri. Armano became the first winger of Italian football while, in attacking zone, Skoglund acted as a playmaker behind Lorenzi and Nyers, both strikers.

Inter conceded few goals and at mid-league, the side had 30 points in 17 games. Inter also did not suffer a loss for 19 consecutive weeks. Despite criticized, sometimes, for his defensive trend, Foni celebrated - with 3 games to spare - the win of the Scudetto, for the first time in 13 years since 1940. Having the best defence of the season, Inter resulted to have conceded only 24 goals. Inter won the title collecting 47 points.

== Squad ==
The roles of players are in brackets.

- (Italy) Gino Armano (winger)
- (Italy) Ivano Blason (full back)
- (Italy) Sergio Brighenti (centre forward)
- (Italy) Pietro Broccini (midfielder)
- (Italy) Sebastiano Buzzin (midfielder)
- (Italy) Osvaldo Fattori (midfielder)
- (Italy) Giorgio Ghezzi (goalkeeper)
- (Italy) Giovanni Giacomazzi (centre back)
- (Italy) Attilio Giovannini (half back)
- (Italy) Lino Grava (full back)
- (Italy) Benito Lorenzi (centre forward)
- (Italy) Bruno Mazza (midfielder)
- (Italy) Lido Mazzoni (winger)
- (Italy) Sergio Morin (midfielder)
- (Italy) Maino Neri (midfielder)
- (Italy) Fulvio Nesti (midfielder)
- (Hungary) István Nyers (centre forward)
- (Italy) Bruno Padulazzi (full back)
- (Sweden) Lennart Skoglund (playmaker)

== Competitions ==
=== Serie A ===
==== League table ====
Pos	Team	Pld	W	D	L	GF	GA	GD	Pts	Qualification or relegation
1	Internazionale (C)	34	19	9	6	46	24	+22	47	
2	Juventus	34	18	9	7	73	40	+33	45	
3	Milan	34	17	9	8	64	34	+30	43	Qualified for the 1953 Latin Cup
4	Napoli	34	15	11	8	53	43	+10	41	
5	Bologna	34	16	7	11	52	43	+9	39	

Source: Panini
(C) Champions

==== Matches ====
14 September 1952 1	Como	0–1	Inter Milan	Como
		Report	20' Nyers	Stadium: Stadio Giuseppe Sinigaglia; Referee: Renzo Massai

21 September 1952 2	Inter Milan	1–0	Atalanta	Milan
	Padulazzi 50'	Report		Stadium: San Siro; Referee: Erminio Piemonte

28 September 1952 3	Torino	1–1	Inter Milan	Turin
	Pratesi 70'	Report	52' Nyers	Stadium: Stadio Filadelfia; Referee: Guido Agnolin

5 October 1952 4	Inter Milan	5–1	Napoli	Milan
	Lorenzi 32', 66', 80'; Nyers 82', 89'	Report	7' Jeppson	Stadium: San Siro; Referee: Riccardo Pieri

12 October 1952 5	Pro Patria	2–2	Inter Milan	Busto Arsizio
	Bertoloni 58', 62'	Report	15' Nyers; 17' Lorenzi	Stadium: Comunale; Referee: Erminio Piemonte

19 October 1952 6	Inter Milan	2–1	Bologna	Milan
	Lorenzi 39'; Mazza 72'	Report	37' Bacci	Stadium: San Siro; Referee: Guido Agnolin

2 November 1952 7	Milan	0–1	Inter Milan	Milan
		Report	86' Lorenzi	Stadium: San Siro; Referee: Renzo Massai

9 November 1952 8	SPAL	0–1	Inter Milan	Ferrara
		Report	81' Skoglund	Stadium: Comunale; Referee: Ferruccio Bellè

16 November 1952 9	Inter Milan	1–0	Triestina	Milan
	Skoglund 44'	Report		Stadium: San Siro; Referee: Giorgio Bernardi

23 November 1952 10	Inter Milan	3–0	Fiorentina	Milan
	Armano 8', 47'; Skoglund 53'	Report		Stadium: San Siro; Referee: Ferruccio Bellè

30 November 1952 11	Roma	1–3	Inter Milan	Rome
	Perissinotto 56'	Report	41', 73' Mazza; 50' Broccini	Stadium: Stadio Nazionale; Referee: Agnolin

7 December 1952 12	Inter Milan	0–0	Udinese	Milan
		Report		Stadium: San Siro; Referee: Bernardi

14 December 1952 13	Lazio	1–1	Inter Milan	Rome
	Puccinelli 45'	Report	21' Lorenzi	Stadium: Stadio Nazionale; Referee: Guido Agnolin

21 December 1952 14	Palermo	0–3	Inter Milan	Palermo
		Report	44' Armano; 70' Nyers; 85' Lorenzi	Stadium: Stadio La Favorita; Referee: Renzo Massai

4 January 1953 15	Inter Milan	2–0	Juventus	Milan
	Lorenzi 30'; Skoglund 61'	Report		Stadium: San Siro; Referee: Agnolin

11 January 1953 16	Inter Milan	2–1	Sampdoria	Milan
	Skoglund 37'; Nyers 68'	Report	3' Galassi	Stadium: San Siro; Referee: Iginio Rigato

18 January 1953 17	Novara	1–2	Inter Milan	Novara
	Piola 57'	Report	2' Mazza; 9' (o.g.) De Togni	Stadium: Stadio Comunale; Referee: Luigi Gemini

25 January 1953 18	Inter Milan	3–1	Como	Milan
	Armano 33'; Nyers 67', 86'	Report	6' Baldini	Stadium: San Siro; Referee: Mario Maurelli

1 February 1953 19	Atalanta	0–1	Inter Milan	Bergamo
		Report	68' Nyers	Stadium: Stadio Comunale; Referee: Riccardo Pieri

8 February 1953 20	Inter Milan	1–3	Torino	Milan
	Nesti 26'	Report	52' Wilkes; 57' Buhtz; 60' Sentimenti III	Stadium: San Siro; Referee: Vincenzo Orlandini

15 February 1953 21	Napoli	0–1	Inter Milan	Naples
		Report	27' Lorenzi	Stadium: Stadio del Vomero; Referee: Ferrucio Bellè

22 February 1953 22	Inter Milan	2–1	Pro Patria	Milan
	Lorenzi 32', 89'	Report	51' Hofling	Stadium: San Siro; Referee: Cesare Jonni

1 March 1953 23	Bologna	2–0	Inter Milan	Bologna
	Mike 6'; Bacci 57'	Report		Stadium: Stadio Renato Dall'Ara; Referee: Riccardo Pieri

8 March 1953 24	Inter Milan	0–0	AC Milan	Milan
		Report		Stadium: San Siro; Referee: Luigi Gemini

15 March 1953 25	Inter Milan	1–1	SPAL	Milan
	Nyers 48'	Report	40' Fontanesi	Stadium: San Siro; Referee: Ugo Scaramella

22 March 1953 26	Triestina	0–0	Inter Milan	Trieste
		Report		Stadium: Stadio Giuseppe Grezar; Referee: Renzo Massai

29 March 1953 27	Fiorentina	1–0	Inter Milan	Florence
	Cervato 84'	Report		Stadium: Stadio Comunale; Referee: Guido Agnolin

5 April 1953 28	Inter Milan	1–0	Roma	Milan
	Nyers 72' (pen.)	Report		Stadium: San Siro; Referee: Riccardo Pieri

12 April 1953 29	Udinese	0–0	Inter Milan	Udine
		Report		Stadium: Stadio Moretti; Referee: Ferruccio Bellè

19 April 1953 30	Inter Milan	1–1	Lazio	Milan
	Nyers 75'	Report	40' Caprile	Stadium: San Siro; Referee: Diego De Leo

3 May 1953 31	Inter Milan	3–0	Palermo	Milan
	Nyers 42' (pen.) 87'; Skoglund 60'	Report		Stadium: San Siro; Referee: Ferruccio Bellè

10 May 1953 32	Juventus	2–1	Inter Milan	Turin
	Boniperti 35'; Praest 88'	Report	73' Giacomazzi	Stadium: Comunale; Referee: Guido Agnolin

24 May 1953 33	Sampdoria	2–0	Inter Milan	Genoa
	Galassi 53'; Bassetto 64'	Report		Stadium: Stadio Luigi Ferraris; Referee: Cesare Jonni

31 May 1953 34	Inter Milan	0–1	Novara	Milan
		Report	38' Feccia	Stadium: San Siro; Referee: Vincenzo Orlandini

== Statistics ==
=== Squad statistics ===
Overall								Home						Away					
Pld	W	D	L	GF	GA	GD	Pts	W	D	L	GF	GA	GD	W	D	L	GF	GA	GD
34	19	9	6	46	24	+22	66	11	4	2	28	11	+17	8	5	4	18	13	+5

Last updated: 31 May 1953.

2 points were awarded for every win, so Inter collected 47 points instead 66.

=== Players statistics ===
Player	Appearances	Goals
G. Ghezzi	34	−24
G. Giacomazzi	33	1
B. Mazza	32	4
A. Giovannini	31	0
I. Nyers	31	15
B. Lorenzi	30	12
L. Skoglund	30	6
G. Armano	29	4
F. Nesti	29	1
M. Neri	26	0
I. Blason	25	0
O. Fattori	13	0
B. Padulazzi	11	1
S. Buzzin	8	0
S. Brighenti	4	0
P. Broccini	4	1
L. Mazzoni	2	0
L. Grava	1	0
S. Morin	1	0

== See also ==
- Inter Milan
