= Football records and statistics in Italy =

This page details football records and statistics in Italy.

== Team records ==
=== Most championships won ===
==== Overall ====
- 36, Juventus

==== Consecutive titles ====
- 9, Juventus (2011–12 season to 2019–20 season)
- 5, Juventus (1930–31 season to 1934–35 season)
- 5, Torino (1942–43 season and the 1945–46 season to 1948–49 season)
- 5, Internazionale (2005–06 season to 2009–10 season)

=== Most seasons in Serie A ===
- 95, Internazionale

=== Most seasons in Serie B ===
- 66, Brescia

=== Most points in a season ===
2 Teams in Final Round (2 points per win) 1928–29

- 4, Bologna

6 Teams in Final Round (2 points per win) 1926–27

- 14, Torino

8 Teams in Final Round (2 points per win) 1927–28 - 1945–46

- 22, Torino

16 Teams (2 points per win) 1934–35 to 1942–43 - 1967–68 to 1987–88

- 51, Juventus 1976–77

18 Teams (2 points per win) 1929–30 to 1933–34 - 1952–53 to 1966–67 - 1988–89 to 1993–94

- 58, Internazionale 1988–89

18 Teams (3 points per win) 1994–95 to 2003–04

- 82, AC Milan 2003–04

20 Teams (2 points per win) 1946–47 - 1948–49 to 1951–52

- 63, Torino 1946–47

20 Teams (3 points per win) 2004–05 to present

- 102, Juventus 2013–14

21 Teams (2 points per win) 1947–48

- 65, Torino

=== Most consecutive wins ===
- 17, Internazionale, 2006–07
- 15, Juventus, 2015–16
- 13, Napoli, 2016–17 to 2017–18
- 13, Juventus, 2013–14 to 2014–15
- 12, Juventus, 2013–14 and 2017–18
- 11, Roma, 2005–06 and 2012–13 to 2013–14
- 11, Napoli, 2022–23
- 11, Internazionale, 2020–21
- 11, Lazio, 2019–20
- 11, Atalanta, 2024–25
- 10, Juventus, 1931–32 and 2015–16
- 10, Internazionale, 2023–24
- 10, Napoli, 2017–18
- 10, Bologna, 1963–64
- 10, AC Milan, 1950–51

=== Most consecutive home wins ===
- 33, Juventus, 2015–16 to 2016–17

=== Most consecutive away wins ===
- 12, Roma, 2016–17 to 2017–18

=== Longest win streak from the start of a Serie A season ===
- 10, Roma, 2013–14

=== Longest win streak without conceding from the start of a Serie A season ===
- 5, Juventus, 2014–15

=== Longest win streak from the start of the second half of a Serie A season ===
- 11, Internazionale, 2020–21

=== Most wins in a single season ===
- 33, Juventus, 2013–14 (38 matches)
- 30, Internazionale, 2006–07 (38 matches)
- 30, Juventus, 2017–18 (38 matches)
- 29, Juventus, 2015–16 and 2016–17 (38 matches)
- 29, Internazionale, 2023–24 (38 matches)
- 29, Torino, 1947–48 (40 matches)
- 28, Torino, 1946–47 (38 matches)
- 28, Juventus, 1949–50 and 2018–19 (38 matches)
- 28, AC Milan, 2005–06 (38 matches)
- 28, Roma, 2016–17 (38 matches)
- 28, Napoli, 2017–18 and 2022–23 (38 matches)
- 28, Internazionale, 2020–21 (38 matches)

=== Most defeats in a single season ===
- 29, Benevento, 2017–18 (38 matches)

=== Most home wins in a season ===
- 19, Juventus, 2013–14 (19 matches)

=== Most away wins in a season ===
- 16, AC Milan, 2020–21 (19 matches)

=== Most matches won ===
- 1,711, Juventus
- 1,597, Internazionale
- 1,506, AC Milan
- 1,324, Roma
- 1,169, Fiorentina

=== Most goals scored ===
- 5,415, Juventus
- 5,385, Internazionale
- 5,083, AC Milan
- 4,597, Roma
- 4,115, Fiorentina

=== Most goals in a season ===
21 Teams

- 125, Torino, 1947–48

20 Teams

- 118, AC Milan, 1949–50

18 Teams

- 95, Fiorentina, 1958–59

16 Teams

- 75, Juventus, 1942–43

=== Longest unbeaten streak ===
- 58, AC Milan, 1990–91 to 1992–93 (26 May 1991, 0–0 v Parma; 21 March 1993, 0–1 v Parma)

=== Longest unbeaten streaks in a single Serie A season ===
16 Teams

- 30, Perugia, 1978–79

18 Teams

- 34, AC Milan, 1991–92

20 Teams

- 38, Juventus, 2011–12

== Individual records ==
=== Most championships won ===
Players in bold are still active in Serie A.

==== 10 championships ====
- Gianluigi Buffon (all with Juventus)

==== 9 championships ====
- Giorgio Chiellini (all with Juventus)
- Leonardo Bonucci (8 with Juventus + 1 with Inter Milan)

==== 8 championships ====
- Virginio Rosetta (2 with Pro Vercelli + 6 with Juventus)
- Giovanni Ferrari (5 with Juventus + 2 with Inter Milan + 1 with Bologna)
- Giuseppe Furino (all with Juventus)
- Andrea Barzagli (all with Juventus)

==== 7 championships ====
- Roberto Bettega (all with Juventus)
- Alessandro Costacurta (all with AC Milan)
- Ciro Ferrara (2 with Napoli + 5 with Juventus)
- Stephan Lichtsteiner (all with Juventus)
- Paolo Maldini (all with AC Milan)
- Claudio Marchisio (all with Juventus)
- Gaetano Scirea (all with Juventus)

==== 6 championships ====
- Guido Ara (all with Pro Vercelli)
- Antonello Cuccureddu (all with Juventus)
- Edoardo Pasteur (all with Genoa)
- James Richardson Spensley (all with Genoa)
- Claudio Gentile (all with Juventus)
- Franco Baresi (all with AC Milan)
- Antonio Cabrini (all with Juventus)
- Franco Causio (all with Juventus)
- Dino Zoff (all with Juventus)
- Roberto Donadoni (all with AC Milan)
- Dejan Stanković (5 with Inter Milan + 1 with Lazio)
- Walter Samuel (5 with Inter Milan + 1 with Roma)
- Alessandro Del Piero (all with Juventus)
- Guglielmo Gabetto (1 with Juventus + 5 with Torino)
- Andrea Pirlo (2 with AC Milan + 4 with Juventus)
- Kwadwo Asamoah (all with Juventus)
- Martín Cáceres (all with Juventus)
- Juan Cuadrado (5 with Juventus + 1 with Inter Milan)

==== 5 championships ====
- Henri Dapples (all with Genoa)
- Enrico Pasteur (all with Genoa)
- Filippo Galli (all with AC Milan)
- Renato Cesarini (all with Juventus)
- Raimundo Orsi (all with Juventus)
- Umberto Caligaris (all with Juventus)
- Mario Varglien (all with Juventus)
- Giovanni Varglien (all with Juventus)
- Gianpiero Combi (all with Juventus)
- Giuseppe Grezar (all with Torino)
- Valentino Mazzola (all with Torino)
- Franco Ossola (all with Torino)
- Ezio Loik (all with Torino)
- Pietro Ferraris (2 with Inter Milan + 3 with Torino)
- Lorenzo Buffon (4 with AC Milan + 1 with Inter Milan)
- Sandro Salvadore (2 with AC Milan + 3 with Juventus)
- Giampiero Boniperti (all with Juventus)
- Tarcisio Burgnich (1 with Juventus + 4 with Inter Milan)
- Francesco Morini (all with Juventus)
- Luciano Spinosi (all with Juventus)
- Marco Tardelli (all with Juventus)
- Pietro Fanna (3 with Juventus + 1 with Hellas Verona + 1 with Inter Milan)
- Sebastiano Rossi (all with AC Milan)
- Demetrio Albertini (all with AC Milan)
- Mauro Tassotti (all with AC Milan)
- Antonio Conte (all with Juventus)
- Alessio Tacchinardi (all with Juventus)
- Júlio César (all with Inter Milan)
- Javier Zanetti (all with Inter Milan)
- Iván Córdoba (all with Inter Milan)
- Marco Materazzi (all with Inter Milan)
- Esteban Cambiasso (all with Inter Milan)
- Paolo Orlandoni (all with Inter Milan)
- Francesco Toldo (all with Inter Milan)
- Simone Padoin (all with Juventus)
- Sami Khedira (all with Juventus)
- **Paulo Dybala** (all with Juventus)
- Alex Sandro (all with Juventus)
- **Daniele Rugani** (all with Juventus)
- Arturo Vidal (4 with Juventus + 1 with Inter Milan)
- Zlatan Ibrahimović (3 with Inter Milan + 2 with AC Milan)

=== Most consecutive championships won ===
- Giorgio Chiellini: 9 (2012–2020, all with Juventus)

=== Oldest player to win a championship ===
- Gianluigi Buffon: 42 years (2019–20)

=== Appearances ===
Top 30 most appearances, all-time (only Serie A regular-season games)

Updated as of 19 September 2024

Players in bold are still active in Serie A. Players in italics are still active outside of Serie A.

Rank	Nat.	Player	Years	Apps	Goals
1	(Italy)	Gianluigi Buffon	1995–2021	657	–
2	(Italy)	Paolo Maldini	1984–2009	647	29
3	(Italy)	Francesco Totti	1992–2017	619	250
4	(Argentina)	Javier Zanetti	1995–2014	615	12
5	(Italy)	Gianluca Pagliuca	1987–2007	592	–
6	(Italy)	Dino Zoff	1961–1983	570	–
7	(Slovenia)	Samir Handanović	2005–2023	566	–
8	(Italy)	Pietro Vierchowod	1980–2000	562	38
9	(Italy)	Fabio Quagliarella	1999–2023	556	182
10	(Italy)	Roberto Mancini	1981–2000	541	156
11	(Italy)	Silvio Piola	1929–1954	537	274
12	(Italy)	Enrico Albertosi	1958–1980	532	–
13	(Italy)	Gianni Rivera	1958–1979	527	128
14	(Italy)	Giuseppe Bergomi	1980–1999	519	23
15	(Italy)	Alberto Gilardino	1999–2017	514	188
16	(Italy)	Andrea Consigli	2008–2024	510	–
17	(Italy)	Antonio Candreva	2008–2024	502	85
18	(Italy)	Ciro Ferrara	1984–2005	500	27
19	(Italy)	Giovanni Galli	1977–1995	496	–
20	(Italy)	Tarcisio Burgnich	1958–1976	494	6
21	(Italy)	Andrea Pirlo	1994–2015	493	58
21	(North Macedonia)	Goran Pandev	2001–2022	493	101
23	(Italy)	Giuseppe Favalli	1989–2010	486	7
24	(Italy)	Angelo Peruzzi	1987–2007	479	–
25	(Italy)	Giancarlo De Sisti	1960–1979	478	50
25	(Italy)	Alessandro Del Piero	1993–2012	478	188
27	(Italy)	Giacinto Facchetti	1960–1978	476	59
28	(Italy)	Franco Baresi	1978–1997	471	12
29	(Italy)	Pietro Ferraris	1929–1950	469	124
30	(Italy)	Sergio Cervato	1948–1965	466	45

Top five most appearances, still active in Serie A (only Serie A regular-season games)

Updated as of 8 September 2026

Rank	All-time rank	Nat.	Player	Debut year	Current club	Apps	Goals
1	31	(Italy)	**Lorenzo De Silvestri**	2006	Bologna	462	28
2	46	(Poland)	**Piotr Zieliński**	2012	Inter Milan	426	51
3	126	(Argentina)	**Paulo Dybala**	2012	Roma	373	131
4	145	(Italy)	**Matteo Politano**	2015	Napoli	366	56

==== Oldest players ====
List of the 20 oldest players at their last Serie A match.

Updated as of 12 September 2026.

Players in bold are still active in Serie A. Players in italics are still active outside of Serie A.

1. (Italy) Marco Ballotta 44 years, 38 days (last game: 11 May 2008, Lazio)
2. (Italy) Gianluigi Buffon 43 years, 83 days (last game: 12 May 2021, Juventus)
3. (Spain) Pepe Reina 42 years, 265 days (last game: 24 May 2025, Como)
4. (Italy) Francesco Antonioli 42 years, 235 days (last game: 6 May 2012, Cesena)
5. (Italy) Gianluca Pegolo 41 years, 303 days (last game: 22 January 2023, Sassuolo)
6. (Italy) Alberto Fontana 41 years, 297 days (last game: 15 November 2008, Palermo)
7. (Italy) Roberto Colombo 41 years, 234 days (last game: 15 April 2017, Cagliari)
8. (Sweden) Zlatan Ibrahimović 41 years, 166 days (last game: 18 March 2023, AC Milan)
9. (Italy) Dino Zoff 41 years, 76 days (last game: 15 May 1983, Juventus)
10. (Italy) Alessandro Costacurta 41 years, 25 days (last game: 19 May 2007, AC Milan)
11. (Italy) Pietro Vierchowod 41 years, 10 days (last game: 16 April 2000, Piacenza)
12. (Croatia) **Luka Modrić** 41 years, 3 days (last game: 12 September 2026, AC Milan)
13. (Italy) Paolo Maldini 40 years, 339 days (last game: 31 May 2009, AC Milan)
14. (Italy) Antonio Mirante 40 years, 322 days (last game: 25 May 2024, AC Milan)
15. (Argentina) Javier Zanetti 40 years, 281 days (last game: 18 May 2014, Inter Milan)
16. (Italy) Francesco Totti 40 years, 243 days (last game: 28 May 2017, Roma)
17. (Italy) Daniele Balli 40 years, 231 days (last game: 4 May 2008, Empoli)
18. (Spain) Raúl Albiol 40 years, 199 days (last game: 22 March 2026, Pisa)
19. (Argentina) Albano Bizzarri 40 years, 192 days (last game: 20 May 2018, Udinese)
20. (Italy) Silvio Piola 40 years, 159 days (last game: 7 March 1954, Novara)

==== Youngest players ====
List of the 20 youngest players at their first Serie A match.

1. (Italy) Francesco Camarda (AC Milan) 15 years, 260 days (25 November 2023)
2. (Italy) Wisdom Amey (Bologna) 15 years, 274 days (12 May 2021)
3. (Italy) Amedeo Amadei (Roma) 15 years, 280 days (2 May 1937)
4. (Italy) Pietro Pellegri (Genoa) 15 years, 280 days (22 December 2016)
5. (Italy) Gianni Rivera (Alessandria) 15 years, 288 days (2 June 1959)
6. (Italy) Aristide Rossi (Cremonese) 15 years, 294 days (29 June 1930)
7. (Italy) Giuseppe Campione (Bologna) 15 years, 298 days (25 June 1989)
8. (Italy) Eddie Salcedo (Genoa) 15 years, 323 days (20 August 2017)
9. (Bulgaria) Valeri Bojinov (Lecce) 15 years, 341 days (22 January 2002)
10. (Italy) Andrea Pirlo (Brescia) 16 years, 2 days (21 May 1995)
11. (Italy) Stephan El Shaarawy (Genoa) 16 years, 55 days (21 December 2008)
12. (Italy) Simone Pafundi (Udinese) 16 years, 69 days (22 May 2022)
13. (Italy) Lorenzo Tassi (Brescia) 16 years, 99 days (22 May 2011)
14. (Ivory Coast) Chaka Traorè (Parma) 16 years, 108 days (10 April 2021)
15. (Italy) Stefano Okaka (Roma) 16 years, 131 days (18 December 2005)
16. (Italy) Paolo Pupita (Cesena) 16 years, 134 days (28 January 1990)
17. (Greece) Lampros Choutos (Roma) 16 years, 139 days (21 April 1996)
18. (Italy) Silvio Piola (Cesena) 16 years, 140 days (16 February 1930)
19. (Italy) Tommaso Maestrelli (Bari) 16 years, 142 days (26 February 1939)
20. (Ivory Coast) Siriki Sanogo (Benevento) 16 years, 142 days (12 May 2018)

==== Oldest player to debut in Serie A ====
Luka Modrić, 39 years, 348 days (23 August 2025, AC Milan)

==== Most consecutive appearances in Serie A ====
Dino Zoff, 332

==== Most consecutive appearances in Serie A for a single club ====
Dino Zoff, 330 (with Juventus)

==== Most seasons in Serie A ====
Paolo Maldini and Francesco Totti, 25

==== Most consecutive seasons in Serie A ====
Paolo Maldini and Francesco Totti, 25

==== Most career club appearances by an Italian player ====
Gianluigi Buffon, 975

==== Most appearances for a single Italian club ====
Paolo Maldini, 902, with AC Milan

=== Goalscoring ===
==== Top 30 goalscorers, all-time (only Serie A regular-season games) ====
Updated as of 25 January 2026

Players in bold are still active in Serie A. Players in italics are still active outside of Serie A.

Rank	Nat.	Player	Years	Goals	Apps	Ratio
1	(Italy)	Silvio Piola (Note: Tally does not include 16 goals that Piola also scored from 29 appearances during the 1945–46 Divisione Nazionale season)	1929–1954	274	537	0.51
2	(Italy)	Francesco Totti	1992–2017	250	619	0.4
3	(Sweden)	Gunnar Nordahl	1948–1958	225	291	0.77
4	(Italy)	Giuseppe Meazza (Note: Tally does not include 45 goals that Meazza also scored from 62 appearances during the 1927–28 Divisione Nazionale and 1928–29 Divisione Nazionale, 7 goals scored from 20 appearances during the 1944 Campionato Alta Italia and 2 goals scored from 14 appearances during the 1945–46 Divisione Nazionale)	1929–1947	216	367	0.59
4	(Brazil) (Italy)	José Altafini	1958–1976	216	459	0.47
6	(Italy)	Antonio Di Natale	2002–2016	209	445	0.47
7	(Italy)	Roberto Baggio	1985–2004	205	452	0.45
8	(Italy)	Ciro Immobile	2009–2026	201	359	0.56
9	(Sweden)	Kurt Hamrin	1956–1971	190	400	0.48
10	(Italy)	Giuseppe Signori	1991–2004	188	344	0.55
10	(Italy)	Alessandro Del Piero	1993–2012	188	478	0.39
10	(Italy)	Alberto Gilardino	1999–2017	188	514	0.37
13	(Argentina)	Gabriel Batistuta	1991–2003	184	318	0.58
14	(Italy)	Fabio Quagliarella	1999–2023	182	556	0.33
15	(Italy)	Giampiero Boniperti	1946–1961	178	443	0.4
16	(Italy)	Amedeo Amadei	1936–1956	174	423	0.41
17	(Italy)	Giuseppe Savoldi	1965–1982	168	405	0.41
18	(Italy)	Guglielmo Gabetto	1934–1949	167	322	0.52
19	(Italy)	Roberto Boninsegna	1965–1979	163	366	0.45
20	(Italy)	Luca Toni	2000–2016	157	344	0.46
21	(Sweden)	Zlatan Ibrahimović	2004–2023	156	283	0.55
21	(Italy)	Gigi Riva	1964–1976	156	289	0.54
21	(Italy)	Filippo Inzaghi	1995–2012	156	370	0.42
21	(Italy)	Roberto Mancini	1981–2000	156	541	0.29
25	(Brazil)	Luís Vinício	1955–1968	155	348	0.45
25	(Italy)	Carlo Reguzzoni	1929–1948	155	401	0.39
27	(Hungary)	István Nyers	1948–1956	153	236	0.65
27	(Argentina)	Hernán Crespo	1996–2012	153	340	0.45
29	(Italy)	Adriano Bassetto	1946–1958	149	329	0.45
30	(Argentina) (Italy)	Omar Sívori	1957–1969	147	278	0.53

==== Top four goal scorers, still active in Serie A (only Serie A regular-season games) ====
Updated as of 15 September 2026

Rank	All-time rank	Nat.	Player	Debut year	Current club	Goals	Apps	Ratio
1	39	(Argentina)	**Lautaro Martínez**	2018	Inter Milan	134	270	0.5
2	43	(Italy)	**Domenico Berardi**	2013	Sassuolo	131	343	0.38
3	44	(Argentina)	**Paulo Dybala**	2012	Roma	131	374	0.35
4	50	(Colombia)	**Duván Zapata**	2013	Torino	127	354	0.36

==== Most goals from a penalty kick ====
Top five penalty kick scorers, all-time (only Serie A regular-season games)

Updated 9 November 2025

Players in bold are still active in Serie A. Players in italics are still active outside of Serie A.

Rank	Nat.	Player	Goals
1	(Italy)	Francesco Totti	71
2	(Italy)	Roberto Baggio	68
3	(Italy)	Ciro Immobile	52
4	(Italy)	Alessandro Del Piero	50
4	(Italy)	**Domenico Berardi**	50

==== Most penalty kicks scored in a single Serie A season ====
Ciro Immobile, 14 (2019–20)

==== Most goals from a free kick ====
Top ten free kick scorers, all-time (only Serie A regular-season games)

Updated 17 December 2017

Players in bold are still active in Serie A. Players in italics are still active outside of Serie A.

Rank	Nat.	Player	Goals
1	(Serbia)	Siniša Mihajlović	28
2	(Italy)	Andrea Pirlo	26 (Note: According to several sources, Andrea Pirlo scored 28 goals from free kicks in Serie A, which would make him the all–time highest goalscorer from set–pieces in Serie A history, alongside Siniša Mihajlović; however, two of his claimed goals are disputed and have been recorded as own goals by two different goalkeepers according to other sources: the first by Sébastien Frey in Verona-Reggina 1–1 on 9 January 2000 (1999–2000 Serie A), and the second by Marco Silvestri in Juventus-Cagliari 3–0 on 16 May 2014 (2013–14 Serie A). According to the official regulations by Lega Serie A, a goal is considered to be an own goal when "a player deflects a shot, cross, or pass from an opponent, which was not directed on target, into their own goal." See also it:Statistiche della Serie A#Calci piazzati.)
3	(Italy)	Alessandro Del Piero	22
4	(Italy)	Francesco Totti	21
4	(Italy)	Roberto Baggio	21
6	(Italy)	Gianfranco Zola	20
7	(Bosnia and Herzegovina)	Miralem Pjanić	15
8	(Argentina)	Diego Maradona	14
9	(Italy)	Enrico Chiesa	13
9	(France)	Michel Platini	13
9	(Uruguay)	Álvaro Recoba	13

==== Most goals from a free kick in a single Serie A match ====
Giuseppe Signori and Siniša Mihajlović, 3 (in Lazio 3–1 Atalanta, 10 April 1994; and Lazio 5–2 Sampdoria, 13 December 1998, respectively)

==== Most goals from a free kick in a single Serie A season ====
Cristiano Lucarelli (2004–05), Alessandro Del Piero (2008–09), Francesco Lodi (2012–13), Andrea Pirlo (2012–13) (all 5) (Note: Note: statistical data only began to be collected from the 2004–05 Serie A season onwards)

==== Most different teams scored against in Serie A ====
Alberto Gilardino, 39

==== Fastest goal scored in Serie A ====
Rafael Leão, 6.2 seconds (20 December 2020, in Sassuolo–AC Milan, 1–2)

==== Oldest goalscorer in Serie A ====
Zlatan Ibrahimović, 41 years, 166 days (18 March 2023, in Udinese–AC Milan, 3–1)

==== Youngest goalscorer in Serie A ====
Amedeo Amadei, 15 years, 287 days (9 May 1937, in Lucchese–Roma, 5–1)

==== Youngest players to score 100 goals in Serie A ====
As of 18 March 2018

Rank	Nat.	Player	Age
1	(Italy)	Giuseppe Meazza	23 years and 32 days
2	(Italy)	Silvio Piola	23 years and 68 days
3	(Italy)	Giampiero Boniperti	23 years and 193 days
4	(Italy)	Felice Borel	23 years and 307 days
5	(Italy)	José Altafini	24 years and 239 days
6	(Argentina)	Mauro Icardi	25 years and 27 days
7	(Uruguay)	Edinson Cavani	25 years and 340 days
8	(Argentina)	Omar Sívori	26 years and 90 days
9	(Italy)	Guglielmo Gabetto	26 years and 104 days
10	(Italy)	Alberto Gilardino	26 years and 105 days

==== Most goals in a single Serie A match ====
Silvio Piola and Omar Sívori, 6

==== Most braces in Serie A ====
Silvio Piola and Gunnar Nordahl, 49

==== Most hat-tricks in Serie A ====
Players in bold are still active in Serie A. Players in italics are still active outside of Serie A.

Gunnar Nordahl, 17

Rank	Nat.	Player	Hat-tricks
1	(Sweden)	Gunnar Nordahl	17
2	(Italy)	Giuseppe Meazza	15
3	(Sweden)	Kurt Hamrin	12
3	(Hungary)	István Nyers	12
5	(Italy)	Filippo Inzaghi	10
5	(Italy)	Silvio Piola	10
7	(Italy)	Adriano Bassetto	9
7	(Italy)	Giuseppe Signori	9
7	(Argentina)	Pedro Manfredini	9
7	(Italy)	Omar Sívori	9

==== Youngest player to score a brace in Serie A ====
Pietro Pellegri, 16 years and 184 days (17 September 2017, in Genoa–Lazio, 2–3)

==== Oldest player to score a brace in Serie A ====
Zlatan Ibrahimović, 40 years and 48 days (20 November 2021, in Fiorentina–AC Milan, 4–3)

==== Most braces in a single Serie A season ====
Oliver Bierhoff (10 in 1997–98)

==== Youngest player to score a hat-trick in Serie A ====
Silvio Piola, 17 years and 132 days

==== Oldest player to score a hat-trick in Serie A ====
Rodrigo Palacio, 39 years and 86 days

==== Most hat-tricks in a single Serie A season ====
Giuseppe Meazza (1929–30), Enrique Guaita (1934–35), Valentino Mazzola (1946–47), István Nyers (1950–51), Pedro Manfredini (1960–61), and Omar Sívori (1960–61) (all four)

==== Youngest player to score more than three goals in a single Serie A match ====
Silvio Piola, 18 years and 54 days

==== Oldest player to score five goals in a single Serie A match ====
Miroslav Klose, 34 years and 330 days

==== Oldest player to score their first goal in Serie A ====
Luka Modrić, 40 years and 5 days, for AC Milan, in a 1–0 home win to Bologna on 14 September 2025

==== Most consecutive Serie A seasons with at least one goal ====
Francesco Totti, 23 (1994–95 to 2016–17)

==== Oldest player to win the Serie A top scorer award ====
Luca Toni (38 years, 2014–15)

==== Most Serie A top scorer awards ====
Gunnar Nordahl, 5 (1949–50, 1950–51, 1952–53, 1953–54, 1954–55)

==== Most goals in a single Serie A season ====
36, Gonzalo Higuaín (2015–16) and Ciro Immobile (2019–20) (Note: Luigi Cevenini's Italian league record of 37 goals was set during the 1913–14 Prima Categoria season, prior to the establishment of the Serie A in the 1929–30 season.)

==== Most headed goals in Serie A ====
Christian Vieri

==== Most headed goals in a single Serie A season ====
Oliver Bierhoff (15 out of 19, 1998–99)

==== Most consecutive Serie A appearances with at least one goal scored ====
Gabriel Batistuta (13 consecutive Serie A games, 2 in 1992–93 and 11 in 1994–95 with Fiorentina)

==== Most consecutive Serie A appearances with at least one goal scored in a single season ====
11, Gabriel Batistuta (in 1994–95, with Fiorentina), Fabio Quagliarella (in 2018–19, with Sampdoria), Cristiano Ronaldo (in 2019-20, with Juventus)

==== Most consecutive Serie A appearances with at least one goal scored since the start of a single season ====
Gabriel Batistuta (in 1994–95, with Fiorentina) (11 consecutive Serie A games)

==== Most consecutive Serie A away appearances with at least one goal scored ====
Giuseppe Signori (from 17 May 1992 to 28 February 1993; 1 in 1991–92 with Foggia, and 9 in 1992–93 with Lazio) (10 consecutive Serie A away games with a goal)

==== Most consecutive Serie A away appearances with at least one goal scored in a single season ====
Giuseppe Signori (in 1992–93, with Lazio) (9 consecutive Serie A away games with a goal) and Cristiano Ronaldo (in 2018–19 and 2019–20, with Juventus)

==== Most seasons with at least 10 goals scored in all competitions by an Italian player ====
Alessandro Del Piero (17 seasons)

==== Highest-scoring Italian players in all competitions ====
The following table shows the ten Italian players that have scored the most professional goals in total throughout their career, at both club and international level (excluding youth competitions).

Players in bold are still active in Serie A. Players in italics are still active outside of Serie A.

Rank	Nat.	Player	Goals
1	(Italy)	Silvio Piola	364 (Note: 391 if his goals in the Divisione Nazionale (16) and goals for the Italy B team (11) are also included) (Note: Although some sources claim that Giorgio Chinaglia is in fact the highest-scoring Italian player in all competitions with 398 career goals, this claim is also disputed, as the NASL did not abide to certain FIFA regulations at the time in which Chinaglia was playing there)
2	(Italy)	Alessandro Del Piero	346 (Note: 362 if his goals for the Italy U-17 (1), U-18 (12), and U-21 teams (3) are included)
3	(Italy)	Giuseppe Meazza	338 (Note: 349 if his goals in the Divisione Nazionale are included)
4	(Italy)	Ciro Immobile	323 (Note: 332 if his goals for the Italy U-21 team (9) are included)
5	(Italy)	Luca Toni	322
6	(Italy)	Roberto Baggio	318 (Note: 321 if his goals for the Italy U-16 team (3) are included)
7	(Italy)	Francesco Totti	316 (Note: 334 if his goals for the Italy U-15 (3), Italy U-16 (2), U-18 (7), U-21 (4), and U-23 teams (2) are included)
8	(Italy)	Filippo Inzaghi	313 (Note: 316 if his goals for the Italy U-21 team (3) are included)
9	(Italy)	Antonio Di Natale	311
10	(Italy)	Alessandro Altobelli	293 (Note: 298 if his goals for the Italy U-21 (2), and U-23 tams (3) are included)

==== Most own goals scored in Serie A history ====
Franco Baresi and Riccardo Ferri (8 each)

=== Assists ===
==== Most assists in Serie A ====
Francesco Totti (162)

The following table shows the ten players that have provided the most assists in Serie A history.

Players in bold are still active in Serie A. Players in italics are still active, but outside Serie A.

Rank	Nat.	Player	Assists	Appearances	Ratio
1	(Italy)	Francesco Totti	162	619	0.26
2	(Italy)	Roberto Baggio	119	452	0.26
3	(Italy)	Alessandro Del Piero	111	478	0.23
4	(Italy)	Gianni Rivera	105	527	0.20
5	(Italy)	Andrea Pirlo	100	493	0.20
6	(Italy)	Antonio Candreva	100	494	0.20
7	(Italy)	Antonio Cassano	99	400	0.25
8	(Italy)	**Domenico Berardi**	85	325	0.20
9	(Italy)	Lorenzo Insigne	74	337	0.22
10	(Bosnia and Herzegovina)	Miralem Pjanić	73	281	0.26

==== Most assists in a single Serie A season ====
Federico Dimarco (2025–26) (18)

==== Oldest assist provider in Serie A ====
1. Zlatan Ibrahimović, 40 years, 6 months and 21 days (24 April 2022, in Lazio–AC Milan, 1–2)

=== Goalkeeping ===
==== Longest consecutive runs without conceding a goal in Serie A ====
The following table shows the goalkeepers that have longest consecutive run without conceding a goal in Serie A. Length column is in minutes.

Players in bold are still active in Serie A. Minutes in bold indicate an active run.

Rank	Nat.	Player	Club	Season	Length
1	(Italy)	Gianluigi Buffon	Juventus	2015–16	974
2	(Italy)	Sebastiano Rossi (Note: Gianpiero Combi's Italian league record unbeaten streak of 934 consecutive minutes without conceding a goal was set during the 1925–26 Prima Divisione season, prior to the establishment of the Serie A in the 1929–30 season.)	AC Milan	1993–94	929
3	(Italy)	Dino Zoff	Juventus	1972–73	903
4	(Italy)	Mario Da Pozzo	Genoa	1963–64	792
5	(Italy)	Gianluigi Buffon	Juventus	2017–18	791
6	(Italy)	Ivan Pelizzoli	Roma	2003–04	774
7	(Italy)	Davide Pinato	Atalanta	1997–98	758
8	(Italy)	Gianluigi Buffon	Juventus	2013–14	745
8	(Italy)	Luca Marchegiani	Lazio	1997–98	745
10	(Italy)	Morgan De Sanctis	Roma	2013–14	744

==== Most clean sheets ====
Updated 22 February 2021

Players in bold are still active in Serie A.

Gianluigi Buffon, 299

==== Most consecutive clean sheets ====
Players in bold are still active in Serie A.

Gianluigi Buffon, 10 (17 January 2016 to 11 March 2016)

==== Most clean sheets in a single season ====
Players in bold are still active in Serie A.

21, Fabio Cudicini (in 1968–69 with AC Milan), Sebastiano Rossi (in 1993–94 with AC Milan), Gianluigi Buffon (in 2011–12 and 2015–16 with Juventus), Morgan De Sanctis (in 2013–14 with Roma), Ivan Provedel (in 2022–23 with Lazio)

==== Most goals conceded in a single season ====
Alex Cordaz (2020–21) (91) (Note: Note: statistical data only began to be collected from the 1994–95 Serie A season onwards)

==== Most penalties saved ====
Samir Handanović, 26

Players in bold are still active in Serie A. Players in italics are still active, but outside Serie A.

Updated as of 3 March 2024

Rank	Nat.	Player	Penalties saved	Appearances	Years
1	(Slovenia)	Samir Handanović	26	566	2005–2023
2	(Italy)	Gianluca Pagliuca	24	592	1988–2007
3	(Italy)	Andrea Consigli	20	510	2009–2024
4	(Italy)	Luca Marchegiani	17	422	1988–2005
5	(Italy)	Giuseppe Moro	16	270	1947–1955
5	(Italy)	Gianluigi Buffon	16	657	1995–2021
7	(Italy)	Francesco Antonioli	14	416	1992–2012
7	(Italy)	Stefano Sorrentino	14	363	2001–2019
9	(Italy)	Gianluigi Donnarumma	13	215	2015–2021
10	(Italy)	Emiliano Viviano	12	251	2009–2018
10	(Italy)	Luigi Turci	12	270	1993–2004
10	(Italy)	Massimo Taibi	12	292	1993–2007
10	(Italy)	Giuseppe Taglialatela	12	173	1991–2002

==== Most consecutive penalties saved ====
Players in bold are still active in Serie A.

Samir Handanović, 6

==== Oldest goalkeeper to save a penalty ====
Players in bold are still active in Serie A.

Gianluigi Buffon, 43 years and 104 days (12 May 2021, in Sassuolo–Juventus, 1–3)

=== Discipline ===
==== Most red cards ====
Updated 29 January 2017

Players in bold are still active in Serie A.

Rank	Nat.	Player	Red cards
1	(Uruguay)	Paolo Montero	16
2	(Italy)	Luigi Di Biagio	12
2	(Italy)	Giulio Falcone	12
2	(Italy)	Cristian Ledesma	12
2	(Italy)	Giampiero Pinzi	12
6	(Italy)	Massimo Ambrosini	11
6	(Italy)	Giuseppe Bergomi	11
6	(Italy)	Giuseppe Biava	11
6	(Italy)	Daniele Conti	11
6	(Portugal)	Fernando Couto	11
6	(Italy)	Giorgio Ferrini	11
6	(Ghana)	Sulley Muntari	11
6	(Italy)	Francesco Totti	11

==== Most red cards in a single Serie A season ====
Luigi Apolloni (2000–01) and Gabriel Paletta (2016–17) (both five)

==== Most yellow cards ====
Updated 24 November 2023

Players in bold are still active in Serie A.

Rank	Nat.	Player	Yellow cards	Appearances	Ratio
1	(Italy)	Giampiero Pinzi	147	389	0.38
2	(Italy)	Daniele Conti	146	338	0.43
3	(Italy)	Daniele De Rossi	124	459	0.27
4	(Italy)	Massimo Ambrosini	115	392	0.29
5	(Italy)	Alessandro Lucarelli	112	385	0.29
6	(Italy)	Luca Cigarini	111	362	0.30
7	(Italy)	Francesco Totti	109	618	0.17
8	(Italy)	Paolo Cannavaro	106	422	0.25
8	(Brazil)	Felipe	106	376	0.28
10	(Italy)	Luigi Di Biagio	104	391	0.26

==== Most yellow cards in a single Serie A season ====
Daniele Conti (2012–13), 16

=== Coaching ===
==== Most appearances in Serie A ====
Carlo Mazzone, 792 (excluding 5 appearances in play-off matches)

==== Most Serie A titles ====
Giovanni Trapattoni, 7

==== Most consecutive Serie A titles ====
Massimiliano Allegri, 5 (all with Juventus)

==== Most Serie A titles with a single club ====
Giovanni Trapattoni, 6 (with Juventus)

==== Most Serie A titles with different clubs ====
Antonio Conte, 5 with 3 clubs (3 with Juventus, 1 with Inter, 1 with Napoli)

==== Youngest manager to win a Serie A title ====
Armando Castellazzi, 33 years and 199 days, (with Ambrosiana–Inter, 1937–38)

==== Oldest manager to win a Serie A title ====
Luciano Spalletti, 64 years, 89 days (with Napoli, 2022–23)

==== Most consecutive appearances in Serie A ====
Nereo Rocco, 605 (between 1955 and 1974, with Padova, AC Milan, and Torino)

==== Most appearances in Serie A with a single club ====
Giovanni Trapattoni, 402 (with Juventus)

==== Most victories in Serie A ====
Giovanni Trapattoni, 352 (16 with AC Milan, 213 with Juventus, 87 with Inter, 7 with Cagliari, and 29 with Fiorentina)

==== Most consecutive victories in Serie A ====
Roberto Mancini, 17 (with Inter, 2006–07 Serie A)

==== Most victories in Serie A with a single team ====
Giovanni Trapattoni, 213 (with Juventus)

== Serie A top scorers (capocannonieri) by season ==
All-time highest bolded.

Season	Tally	Player(s) (club(s))
1929–30	31 goals	(Italy) Giuseppe Meazza (Inter Milan)
1930–31	28 goals	(Italy) Rodolfo Volk (Roma)
1931–32	25 goals	(Uruguay) Pedro Petrone (Fiorentina) (Italy) Angelo Schiavio (Bologna)
1932–33	29 goals	(Italy) Felice Borel (Juventus)
1933–34	32 goals	(Italy) Felice Borel (Juventus)
1934–35	28 goals	(Argentina) Enrico Guaita (Roma)
1935–36	25 goals	(Italy) Giuseppe Meazza (Inter Milan)
1936–37	21 goals	(Italy) Silvio Piola (Lazio)
1937–38	20 goals	(Italy) Giuseppe Meazza (Inter Milan)
1938–39	19 goals	(Italy) Aldo Boffi (AC Milan) (Uruguay) Ettore Puricelli (Bologna)
1939–40	24 goals	(Italy) Aldo Boffi (AC Milan)
1940–41	22 goals	(Uruguay) Ettore Puricelli (Bologna)
1941–42	22 goals	(Italy) Aldo Boffi (AC Milan)
1942–43	21 goals	(Italy) Silvio Piola (Lazio)
1945–46	13 goals	(Italy) Eusebio Castigliano (Torino)
1946–47	29 goals	(Italy) Valentino Mazzola (Torino)
1947–48	27 goals	(Italy) Giampiero Boniperti (Juventus)
1948–49	26 goals	(Hungary) Stefano Nyers (Inter Milan)
1949–50	35 goals	(Sweden) Gunnar Nordahl (AC Milan)
1950–51	34 goals	(Sweden) Gunnar Nordahl (AC Milan)
1951–52	30 goals	(Denmark) John Hansen (Juventus)
1952–53	26 goals	(Sweden) Gunnar Nordahl (AC Milan)
1953–54	23 goals	(Sweden) Gunnar Nordahl (AC Milan)
1954–55	26 goals	(Sweden) Gunnar Nordahl (AC Milan)
1955–56	29 goals	(Italy) Gino Pivatelli (Bologna)
1956–57	22 goals	(Brazil) Dino Da Costa (Roma)
1957–58	28 goals	(Wales) John Charles (Juventus)
1958–59	33 goals	(Argentina) Antonio Angelillo (Inter Milan)
1959–60	28 goals	(Argentina) Omar Sívori (Juventus)
1960–61	27 goals	(Italy) Sergio Brighenti (Sampdoria)
1961–62	22 goals	(Brazil) (Italy) José Altafini (AC Milan) (Italy) Aurelio Milani (Fiorentina)
1962–63	19 goals	(Denmark) Harald Nielsen (Bologna) (Argentina) Pedro Manfredini (Roma)
1963–64	21 goals	(Denmark) Harald Nielsen (Bologna)
1964–65	17 goals	(Italy) Alberto Orlando (Fiorentina) (Italy) Sandro Mazzola (Inter Milan)
1965–66	25 goals	(Brazil) Luís Vinício (Vicenza)
1966–67	18 goals	(Italy) Gigi Riva (Cagliari)
1967–68	15 goals	(Italy) Pierino Prati (AC Milan)
1968–69	21 goals	(Italy) Gigi Riva (Cagliari)
1969–70	21 goals	(Italy) Gigi Riva (Cagliari)
1970–71	24 goals	(Italy) Roberto Boninsegna (Inter Milan)
1971–72	22 goals	(Italy) Roberto Boninsegna (Inter Milan)
1972–73	17 goals	(Italy) Paolo Pulici (Torino) (Italy) Gianni Rivera (AC Milan) (Italy) Giuseppe Savoldi (Bologna)

Season	Tally	Player(s) (club(s))
1973–74	24 goals	(Italy) Giorgio Chinaglia (Lazio)
1974–75	18 goals	(Italy) Paolo Pulici (Torino)
1975–76	21 goals	(Italy) Paolo Pulici (Torino)
1976–77	21 goals	(Italy) Francesco Graziani (Torino)
1977–78	24 goals	(Italy) Paolo Rossi (Vicenza)
1978–79	19 goals	(Italy) Bruno Giordano (Lazio)
1979–80	16 goals	(Italy) Roberto Bettega (Juventus)
1980–81	18 goals	(Italy) Roberto Pruzzo (Roma)
1981–82	15 goals	(Italy) Roberto Pruzzo (Roma)
1982–83	16 goals	(France) Michel Platini (Juventus)
1983–84	20 goals	(France) Michel Platini (Juventus)
1984–85	18 goals	(France) Michel Platini (Juventus)
1985–86	19 goals	(Italy) Roberto Pruzzo (Roma)
1986–87	17 goals	(Italy) Pietro Paolo Virdis (AC Milan)
1987–88	15 goals	(Argentina) Diego Maradona (Napoli)
1988–89	22 goals	(Italy) Aldo Serena (Inter Milan)
1989–90	19 goals	(Netherlands) Marco van Basten (AC Milan)
1990–91	19 goals	(Italy) Gianluca Vialli (Sampdoria)
1991–92	25 goals	(Netherlands) Marco van Basten (AC Milan)
1992–93	26 goals	(Italy) Giuseppe Signori (Lazio)
1993–94	23 goals	(Italy) Giuseppe Signori (Lazio)
1994–95	26 goals	(Argentina) Gabriel Batistuta (Fiorentina)
1995–96	24 goals	(Italy) Giuseppe Signori (Lazio) (Italy) Igor Protti (Bari)
1996–97	24 goals	(Italy) Filippo Inzaghi (Atalanta)
1997–98	27 goals	(Germany) Oliver Bierhoff (Udinese)
1998–99	22 goals	(Brazil) Márcio Amoroso (Udinese)
1999–2000	24 goals	(Ukraine) Andriy Shevchenko (AC Milan)
2000–01	26 goals	(Argentina) Hernán Crespo (Lazio)
2001–02	24 goals	(France) David Trezeguet (Juventus) (Italy) Dario Hübner (Piacenza)
2002–03	24 goals	(Italy) Christian Vieri (Inter Milan)
2003–04	24 goals	(Ukraine) Andriy Shevchenko (AC Milan)
2004–05	24 goals	(Italy) Cristiano Lucarelli (Livorno)
2005–06	31 goals	(Italy) Luca Toni (Fiorentina)
2006–07	26 goals	(Italy) Francesco Totti (Roma)
2007–08	21 goals	(Italy) Alessandro Del Piero (Juventus)
2008–09	25 goals	(Sweden) Zlatan Ibrahimović (Inter Milan)
2009–10	29 goals	(Italy) Antonio Di Natale (Udinese)
2010–11	28 goals	(Italy) Antonio Di Natale (Udinese)
2011–12	28 goals	(Sweden) Zlatan Ibrahimović (AC Milan)
2012–13	29 goals	(Uruguay) Edinson Cavani (Napoli)
2013–14	22 goals	(Italy) Ciro Immobile (Torino)
2014–15	22 goals	(Argentina) Mauro Icardi (Inter Milan) (Italy) Luca Toni (Hellas Verona)
2015–16	**36 goals**	(Argentina) **Gonzalo Higuaín** (Napoli)
2016–17	29 goals	(Bosnia and Herzegovina) Edin Džeko (Roma)
2017–18	29 goals	(Argentina) Mauro Icardi (Inter Milan) (Italy) Ciro Immobile (Lazio)
2018–19	26 goals	(Italy) Fabio Quagliarella (Sampdoria)
2019–20	**36 goals**	(Italy) **Ciro Immobile** (Lazio)
2020–21	29 goals	(Portugal) Cristiano Ronaldo (Juventus)
2021–22	27 goals	(Italy) Ciro Immobile (Lazio)
2022–23	26 goals	(Nigeria) Victor Osimhen (Napoli)
2023–24	24 goals	(Argentina) Lautaro Martínez (Inter Milan)
2024–25	25 goals	(Italy) Mateo Retegui (Atalanta)
2025–26	17 goals	(Argentina) Lautaro Martínez (Inter Milan)

- Source for figures before 1997 from RSSSF.com:
- Source for figures after 1997 from lega-calcio.it:

== Retired numbers ==
Up to the present day, nineteen different top clubs in Italy have retired numbers for different reasons, mostly in recognition of their former players.

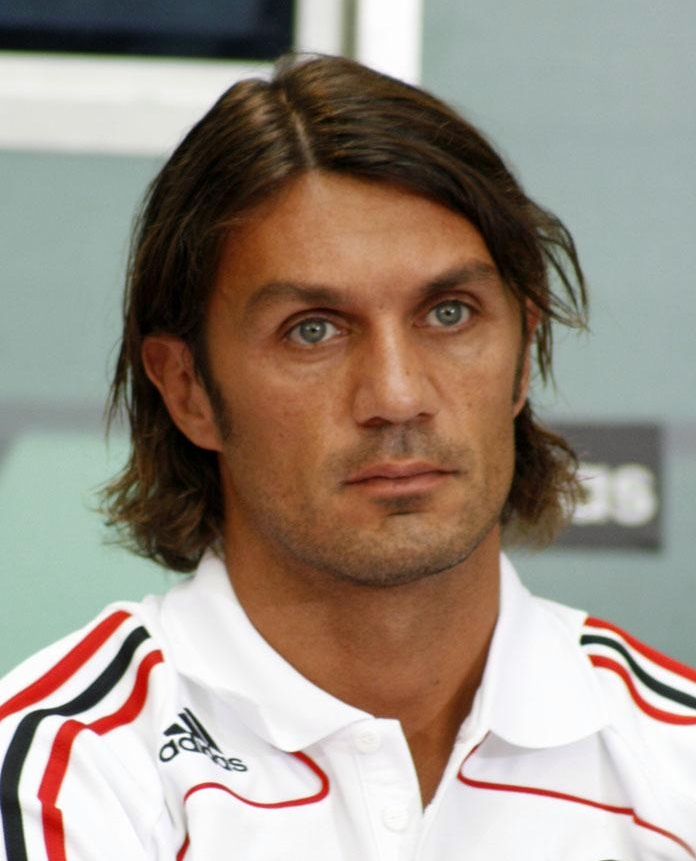
Paolo Maldini had his #3 retired by AC Milan after spending 25 years (his entire professional career) with the club

No.	Player	Pos.	Club	Tenure	Ref.
14	(Italy) Federico Pisani (Note: Posthumous honour.)	FW	Atalanta	1991–1997	
2	(Italy) Giovanni Loseto	DF	Bari	1982–1993	
27	(Italy) Niccolò Galli	DF	Bologna	2000–2001	
10	(Italy) Roberto Baggio	FW	Brescia	2000–2004	
13	(Italy) Vittorio Mero	DF	Brescia	1998–2001; 2002	
11	(Italy) Gigi Riva	FW	Cagliari	1963–1978	
13	(Italy) Davide Astori	DF	Cagliari	2008–2014	
30	(Democratic Republic of the Congo) Jason Mayélé	FW	Chievo	2001–2002	
4	(Italy) Antonio Galardo	MF	Crotone	1995–1998; 2002–2016	
13	(Italy) Davide Astori	DF	Fiorentina	2015–2018	
6	(Italy) Gianluca Signorini	DF	Genoa	1995–1998	
7	(Italy) Marco Rossi	MF	Genoa	2003–2004; 2005–2013	
12	Gradinata Nord (the 12th man)	–	Genoa	–	
3	(Italy) Giacinto Facchetti	DF	Inter Milan	1961–1978	
4	(Argentina) Javier Zanetti	DF	Inter Milan	1995–2014	
12	(the 12th man)	–	US Lecce	–	
25	(Italy) Piermario Morosini	MF	Livorno	2012	
41	(Italy) Salvatore Sullo	MF	Messina	2001–2007	
3	(Italy) Paolo Maldini	DF	AC Milan	1984–2009	
6	(Italy) Franco Baresi	DF	AC Milan	1977–1997	
10	(Argentina) Diego Maradona	MF	Napoli	1984–1991	
6	(Italy) Alessandro Lucarelli	DF	Parma	2008–2018	
4	(Italy) Vincenzo Zucchini	MF	Pescara	1973–1979	
10	(Italy) Francesco Totti	FW	Roma	1992–2017	
4	(Italy) Roberto Breda	MF	Salernitana	1993–1999; 2003–2005	
4	(Italy) Michele Mignani	DF	Siena	1993–1997; 1998–2006	
4	(Italy) Francesco Magnanelli	MF	Sassuolo	2005–2022	
3	(Italy) Giulio Savoini	DF	Vicenza	1953–1966	
25	(Italy) Piermario Morosini	MF	Vicenza	2007–2009; 2011	

== Most successful clubs overall (1898–present) ==
The following table includes only Italian, European and worldwide competitions organised respectively by FIGC, UEFA and FIFA since 1898. The figures in bold represent the most times this competition has been won by an Italian team. Teams which have one at least one official title are included, ranked by number of overall titles at national and/or international level and listed in chronological order in case of a tie. In particular, note that the UEFA Cup unlike the Inter-Cities Fairs Cup was an official competition organized by UEFA. Original idea of the ICFC was a trade fairs promoting competition and was not organised by UEFA. It is not considered as an official tournament by UEFA due to the major idea of promoted trade fairs and the system of admission of the first editions. At the beginning it was only open to a certain few clubs from some European countries that were promoting trade and not an open football tournament. However, it is the official predecessor of UEFA Cup - Europa League (by UEFA) and recognized by FIFA (and FIGC) as a major trophy.

=== Key ===
Domestic competitions organized by FIGC
A	Serie A, former Italian Football Championship
CI	Coppa Italia
SI	Supercoppa Italiana
European competitions organized by UEFA
UCL	UEFA Champions League, former European Champion Clubs' Cup
CWC	UEFA Cup Winners' Cup (Defunct)
UEL	UEFA Europa League, former UEFA Cup
UECL	UEFA Conference League
USC	UEFA Super Cup
UIC	UEFA Intertoto Cup (Defunct)
IC	UEFA/CONMEBOL Intercontinental Cup (Defunct) (Predecessor to FCWC)
ICFC	Inter-Cities Fairs Cup (Defunct) (Not organized by UEFA, but recognized as the predecessor to the UEL and acknowledged by FIFA as a major trophy)
Intercontinental competition organized by FIFA
FCWC	FIFA Club World Cup

=== By club ===
Club	FIGC				UEFA								FIFA		Total
Club	A	CI	SI	Total	UCL	CWC	UEL	UECL	ICFC^{#}	USC	UIC	Total	IC*	FCWC	Total
Juventus	**36**	**15**	**9**	**60**	2	1	**3**	-	-	2	**1**	9	2	-	**71**
AC Milan	19	5	8	32	**7**	**2**	-	-	-	**5**	-	**14**	**3**	**1**	50
Inter Milan	21	10	8	39	3	-	**3**	-	-	-	-	6	2	**1**	48
Roma	3	9	2	14	-	-	-	**1**	**1**	-	-	2	-	-	16
Lazio	2	7	5	14	-	1	-	-	-	1	-	2	-	-	16
Napoli	4	6	3	13	-	-	1	-	-	-	-	1	-	-	14
Torino	7	5	-	12	-	-	-	-	-	-	-	-	-	-	12
Bologna	7	3	-	10	-	-	-	-	-	-	**1**	1	-	-	11
Genoa	9	1	-	10	-	-	-	-	-	-	-	-	-	-	10
Fiorentina	2	6	1	9	-	1	-	-	-	-	-	1	-	-	10
Parma	-	3	1	4	-	1	2	-	-	1	-	4	-	-	8
Pro Vercelli	7	-	-	7	-	-	-	-	-	-	-	-	-	-	7
Sampdoria	1	4	1	6	-	1	-	-	-	-	-	1	-	-	7
Atalanta	-	1	-	1	-	-	1	-	-	-	-	1	-	-	2
Casale	1	-	-	1	-	-	-	-	-	-	-	-	-	-	1
Novese	1	-	-	1	-	-	-	-	-	-	-	-	-	-	1
Cagliari	1	-	-	1	-	-	-	-	-	-	-	-	-	-	1
Hellas Verona	1	-	-	1	-	-	-	-	-	-	-	-	-	-	1
Vado	-	1	-	1	-	-	-	-	-	-	-	-	-	-	1
Venezia	-	1	-	1	-	-	-	-	-	-	-	-	-	-	1
Vicenza	-	1	-	1	-	-	-	-	-	-	-	-	-	-	1
Perugia	-	-	-	-	-	-	-	-	-	-	**1**	1	-	-	1
Udinese	-	-	-	-	-	-	-	-	-	-	**1**	1	-	-	1

Additionally, the Alta Italia Championship, also known as Campionato di guerra (War Championship), won by the Vigili del Fuoco della Spezia in 1944 (the only edition ever held), was recognised by the FIGC in 2002 as the equivalent to the Serie A championship of that year.
^{#} Although not organised by UEFA, the Inter-Cities Fairs Cup is included here under UEFA as it is the official predecessor to the UEL and acknowledged by FIFA as a major trophy.
^{*} Although organized by UEFA (and CONMEBOL), the Intercontinental Cup is included here under FIFA for being the predecessor to the FCWC.
