= Gino Armano =

Italian footballer (1927–2003)

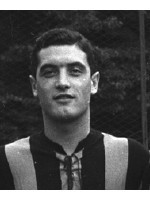
- Armano in the 1950s

Personal information
- Date of birth: 25 October 1927
- Place of birth: Alessandria, Italy
- Date of death: 29 October 2003 (aged 76)
- Place of death: Alessandria, Italy
- Position: Forward

Senior career*
Years	Team	Apps	(Gls)
1945–1948	Alessandria	66	(9)
1948–1956	Inter Milan	255	(73)
1956–1959	Torino	89	(25)
Total		410	(107)

Managerial career
- 1965–1966: Alessandria
- * Club domestic league appearances and goals

Gino Armano (25 October 1927 – 29 October 2003) was an Italian footballer who played as a forward. In Alfredo Foni's catenaccio system at Inter, he played as a right winger, essentially acting as a tornante, due to his defensive contribution.

== Career ==
Armano was born in Alessandria. At club level, he began his career with Italian side Alessandria, before moving to Inter Milan, where he made 255 appearances between 1948 and 1956, scoring 73 goals, and also served as the team's captain between 1954 and 1956. He won two consecutive Serie A Championships with the club between 1952 and 1954, and was one of the members of Inter's strong attacking line of the 1950s, alongside Lennart Skoglund, Stefano Nyers, and Benito Lorenzi. He later also played for Torino before retiring.

== Honours ==
Alessandria

- Serie B: 1945–46

Inter Milan

- Serie A: 1952–53, 1953–54
