= Lennart Skoglund =

Swedish footballer (1929–1975)

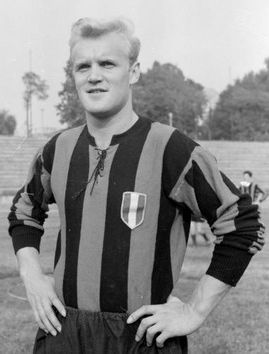
- Skoglund in 1955

Personal information
- Full name: Karl Lennart Skoglund
- Date of birth: 24 December 1929
- Place of birth: Stockholm, Sweden
- Date of death: 8 July 1975 (aged 45)
- Place of death: Stockholm, Sweden
- Height: 1.70 m (5 ft 7 in)
- Position: Left winger

Youth career
- 1943–1944: IK Stjärnan
- 1944: Sport-Ham
- 1944–1946: Hammarby IF

Senior career*
Years	Team	Apps	(Gls)
1946–1949	Hammarby IF	57	(21)
1949–1950	AIK	5	(0)
1950–1959	Inter Milan	241	(55)
1959–1962	Sampdoria	78	(15)
1962–1963	Palermo	6	(0)
1964–1967	Hammarby IF	56	(7)
1968	Kärrtorps IK	6	(2)
Total		449	(100)

International career
1950–1964	Sweden	11	(1)
Medal record
Representing Sweden
FIFA World Cup
Third place	1950 Brazil
Runner-up	1958 Sweden
- * Club domestic league appearances and goals

Karl Lennart "Nacka" Skoglund (pronounced [ˈlɛ̌nːaʈ ˈnâkːa ˈskûːɡlɵnd]; 24 December 1929 – 8 July 1975) was a Swedish footballer who played as left winger. He began his career in his home country with Hammarby IF, but later played for several Italian clubs, most notably Inter Milan, with whom he won two Serie A titles over nine years.

One of the most renowned Swedish players, Skoglund was particularly known for his dribbling ability. In addition to his success at club level, Skoglund was a member of the Swedish teams that finished third in the 1950 FIFA World Cup and second in the 1958 FIFA World Cup.

== Early life ==
Lennart Skoglund was born on December 24, 1929 at Allmänna BB in the affluent Östermalm district of Stockholm, but grew up in a working-class home in the Södermalm district. He lived together with his parents, Josef and Linnéa, and two brothers, Georg and Karl-Evert, in a small apartment. Lennart Skoglund graduated elementary school from Katarina södra, not far from his childhood home.

At a young age he showed talent in sports and exercised bandy, ice hockey and handball. He also played handball in the Swedish top tier for IK Göta. His footballing career would however start in 1943 at the local club BK Stjärnan. Since the club got dissolved soon after his arrival, Skoglund enjoyed a short stint at another local club called Sport-Ham, before joining Hammarby IF in 1944.

At age 14, he regularly featured in the eldest youth team, where a Hammarby official described him as a "trickster with the fastest feet we've ever seen on Södermalm".

== Club career ==
=== Breakthrough at Hammarby ===
On 5 June 1946, Lennart Skoglund made his senior debut for Hammarby, who by then competed in the Swedish third tier, in a friendly against the Finnish club Sudet. Aged 16, he made 11 competitive appearances during the season as the club finished at the foot of Division 2 Östra. In a friendly against then domestic giants Degerfors IF during the spring of 1947, Skoglund received much praise from constantly outshining his opponent Olle Åhlund – a Swedish international – on the left flank.

At this time in his life, Skoglund also received the famous nickname "Nacka" due to the presence of another player with the same name at Hammarby. The origin of his moniker is however disputed. Some sources claim Skoglund got dubbed as "Nacka" since he had been playing football in the Stockholm-outskirt Nacka during the winters. Others say it derives from the fact that his older brother Georg "Jojje" Skoglund represented the club Nacka FF, while some consider it as a homage to his father's profession as a gardener in said area.

Skoglund played his last game for Hammarby on 19 October 1949, against Västerås SK in Division 3 Östra. Across four seasons with Hammarby, Skoglund would appear 57 times in the lower leagues.

=== Short stint at AIK ===
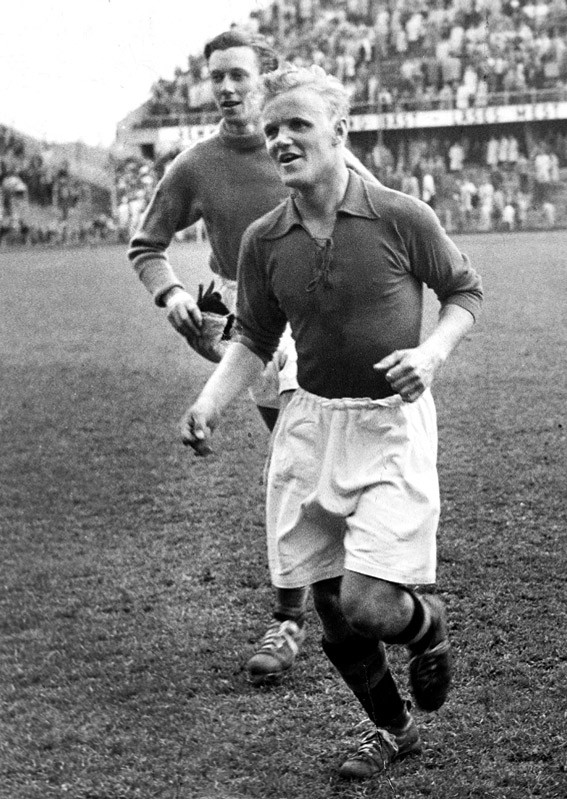
Skoglund playing for "Pressens lag" against the Sweden men's national team in 1950.

In October 1949, he was controversially sold to rivals AIK due to the sad financial situation at Hammarby. The fee, it is said, was 1,000 Swedish kronor (around 70 pounds sterling) plus a rug, a coat for his mother and a tailored suit.

Immediately after his arrival he joined up with his new side on a friendly tour in England. Then Liverpool manager, George Kay was impressed by Skoglund and told the press that "this kid going to be great". His competitive debut for AIK would however be postponed, since Skoglund executed the compulsory Swedish military service during the spring of 1950.

Skoglund managed to win a domestic title during his brief stint at AIK. The club won the 1950 Svenska Cupen as they claimed a 3–2 win over Helsingborgs IF on home turf, Råsunda Stadium, in the final on 24 July 1950.

On 30 July 1950, Skoglund made his first appearance in Allsvenskan for AIK in a match against Malmö FF. He also scored in a 3-1–win against A.C. Milan in a friendly on home turf not much later. These performances led to Skoglund being called up to Pressens lag – a team picked by journalists – which were to face the Sweden national team in a friendly on 18 May 1950. Skoglund scored a brace in the game and impressed enough national team manager Putte Kock to get called up to the 1950 FIFA World Cup which took place between 24 June 1950 and 16 July 1950 in Brazil.

Skoglund only managed to make five appearances for AIK in the 1950–51 Allsvenskan, when the club for the first time in its history got relegated from the top tier. Impressed by his performances during the 1950 World Cup, the Brazilian club São Paulo FC offered 10,000 dollars for him, but the price was considered too low by AIK.

=== Inter Milan ===
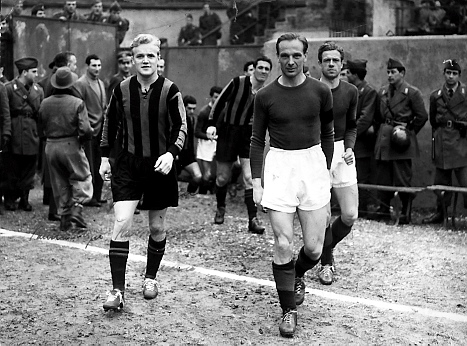
Skoglund (left) entering the pitch ahead of a game against Torino on 7 January 1951, where he faced fellow Swede Kjell Rosén (right)

During the fall of 1950, Skoglund got sold to the Italian giants Inter Milan in a deal reportedly worth 12 million lire, or 6,860 pounds. Upon his arrival in Milan in October said year, he was greeted by 2,000 supporters of the club. Skoglund made his debut in the Serie A in a 5-1–win against Sampdoria. Weeks later, he scored a brace in the Derby della Madonnina as Inter Milan won 3–2 against A.C. Milan. In 29 appearances during his first season, he scored 12 goals as Inter finished a point behind their city rivals at the top of the table.

After the successful start in Italy, Skoglund soon established himself as a key player at Inter Milan as the club won the Serie A in both 1952–53 and 1953–54. During the latter season, Skoglund provided three assists as István Nyers scored a hat-trick in a decisive title winning game against rivals A.C. Milan. Skoglund also enjoyed a fruitful partnership with strikers Benito Lorenzi and Faas Wilkes during Inter Milan's league winning seasons. Manager Alfredo Foni, appointed in 1952, had adopted a highly defensive approach with the Swede being an essential part of the team's attacking force from his left wing.

Foni departed from Inter Milan at the end of the 1954–55 season after the defending champions had finished eighth in the league. The club, as well as Skoglund individually, would then come to endure some difficult years. The club had been bought by Angelo Moratti in late 1955, who made seven managerial changes during the first three years of his presidency. During this period, Inter Milan failed to produce any sort of challenge in Serie A.

Skoglund enjoyed a revival at Inter Milan during his later years at the club. Ahead of the 1958 FIFA World Cup on Swedish home soil, the club management offered him a 10,000 Swedish crowns – or 700 pounds – bonus if he won the tournament. The reason cited was Inter Milan sensing the potential benefits of Skoglund's increased box-office appeal.

In all, Skoglund played 246 competitive matches for Inter Milan, scoring 57 goals. He hesitantly left the club in the summer of 1959, at age 29.

=== Sampdoria and Palermo ===
Ahead of the 1959–60 season, Skoglund was signed by Sampdoria. The reported transfer fee was set at 30 million lire, or 17,250 pounds. Warmly received by the fans, Skoglund played as a regular for the next three seasons while putting on decent performances. The Genoa-based club was however far away from contending of any domestic titles during Skoglund's years at the club.

During the summer of 1962, Skoglund signed with Palermo. His time in Sicily was however disastrous from the outset, with the player being accommodated in a utility room beneath the stands of the Stadio Della Favorita. Skoglund also found himself bored and frustrated in the city and quickly sought a move elsewhere.

In October the same year, Skoglund trained with Juventus, stating he would be "honoured to end my career with such a club". He however failed to impress the Turin-based club officials during his trial and soon returned to Palermo, only appearing six times over the course of the season. Hence, his long lasting career in Italy and the Serie A effectively came to its end in July 1963.

=== Return to Sweden ===
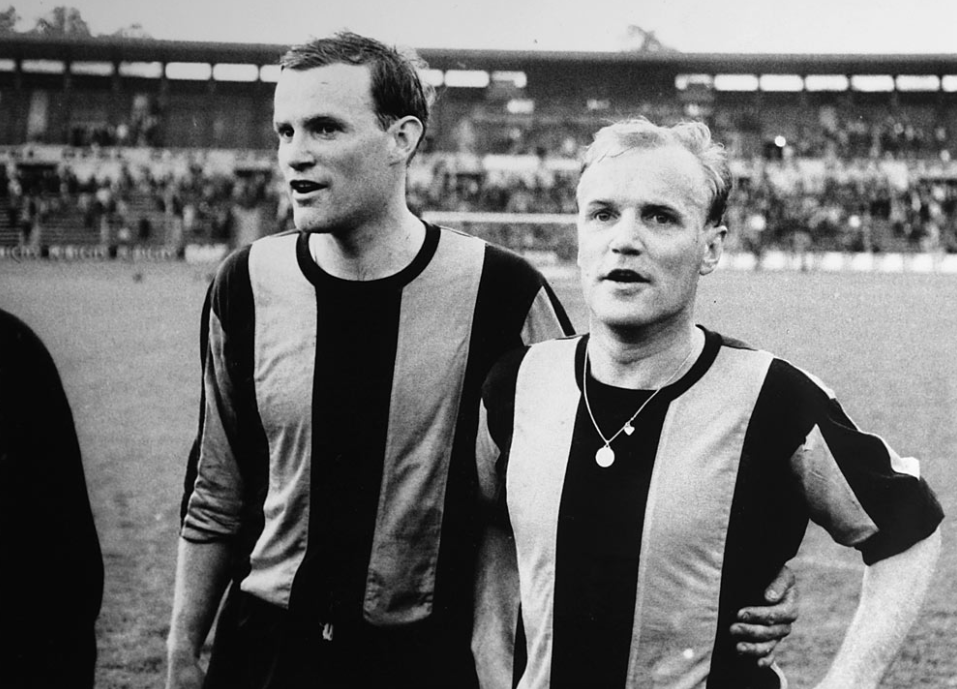
Brothers Karl-Evert "Ya" Skoglund (left) and Lennart "Nacka" Skoglund (right) with Hammarby in 1965, pictured after a game against Örgryte IS on 23 June

In late 1963, he contacted the management of his former club Hammarby IF, now competing in the Swedish second tier, and offered his services. Skoglund made his competitive comeback in a match against Karlstad BK at Johanneshovs IP on 8 May 1964. Within minutes of his debut, he scored perhaps the most famous goal of his career, curling home direct from a corner in a 4-1–win.

Back at his favourite club and native Södermalm, Skoglund revived his footballing career as Hammarby won promotion to Allsvenskan the same year. Goalkeeper Ronnie Hellström, who later would win the prize Guldbollen as Sweden's best footballer, said the following on his teammate:

Nacka did things with the ball like no one else could. After the training sessions he liked to shoot at me and the ball just swished past me all the time. And what passes he provided during the matches ... His teammates always had neutrals.

Back at Hammarby, he played together with his younger brother Karl-Evert Skoglund for three seasons, two in Division 2 and one in Allsvenskan, forming a fruitful partnership on the left flank.

Skoglund eventually opted to retire from top-flight football. He marked an end to his second stint at Hammarby after the 1967 season, scoring 7 goals in 56 appearances in total. The year after he enjoyed a short stint at the amateur club Kärrtorps IK, a fourth tier side managed by his older brother, Georg "Jojje" Skoglund.

== International career ==
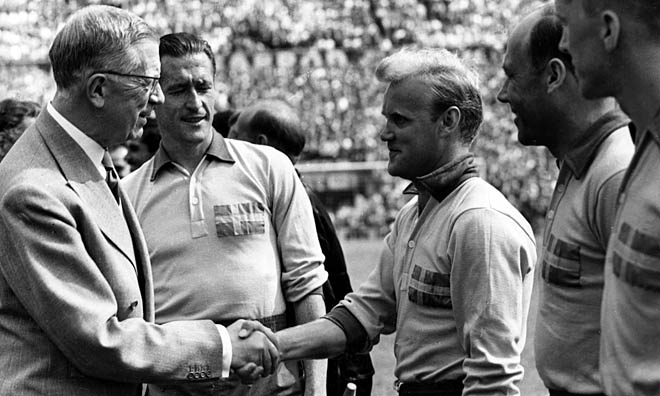
The Swedish king Gustaf VI Adolf greets "Nacka" during the 1958 World Cup on home soil. Team captain Nils Liedholm, Gunnar Gren and Agne Simonsson are also pictured.

Lennart Skoglund made his international debut for Sweden on 8 May 1950, in a 4–1 friendly win against the Netherlands.

A month later, he was part of the Swedish squad in the 1950 FIFA World Cup in Brazil. The Swedish Football Association had insisted that the squad entirely would consist of amateur players. Those who had gone abroad and turned professional – most notably Gunnar Gren, Gunnar Nordahl and Nils Liedholm at A.C. Milan – were therefore unavailable for a call up.

On 25 June 1950, Sweden faced Italy in the first game of the tournament. Skoglund played the whole game as Sweden surprisingly won 3–2 with one Italian newspaper labelling him as Sweden's "best asset". Skoglund's efforts also earned him a new nickname: "The swaying corn-cob", as a reference to his blond hair and running style. However, Skoglund did not appear again after a 7–1 defeat to hosts Brazil in the final group stage. After a controversy with the national team coach Putte Kock regarding issues related to behaviour, Skoglund got deemed surplus to requirements along with Stellan Nilsson ahead of the team's two remaining matches against Uruguay and Spain. Sweden would eventually secure a third place at the tournament and win their first World Cup medal throughout history.

Skoglund waited until 1958 to be called up to the national team in the 1958 World Cup on home soil, in accordance with the Swedish Football Association's policy to ban professional players from representing the side. Ahead of said tournament they, however, had a change of heart and opted to recall exiles like Skoglund. Skoglund appeared in all six of Sweden's games and in the semi-final against West Germany, Skoglund scored his first and only goal for his country in a 3–1 win, as he slid home the equaliser from a tight angle.

During the early stages of the tournament Skoglund had, however, launched an astonishing attack on his coach George Raynor. Skoglund criticised the manager's training methods and said:

He went so far as to drive us into the woods for our running. Personally, I thought that was really unthinkable. One can easily twist a foot among the roots of the trees.

In the final against Brazil at Råsunda Stadium, Skoglund was neutralized by defender Djalma Santos as Sweden lost 2–5. Sweden finished runners-up to a team inspired by the genius of young talents like Pelé and Garrincha. Skoglund was, however, voted as the best left winger in the whole tournament.

Skoglund would not win another cap for his country until several years later. His good friend Agne Simonsson, a teammate from the 1958 World Cup, had convinced the Swedish Football Association on calling up Skoglund for a friendly against Poland in October 1964. Aged 34, Skoglund played his 11th and last international game as Sweden drew 3–3.

== Style of play ==
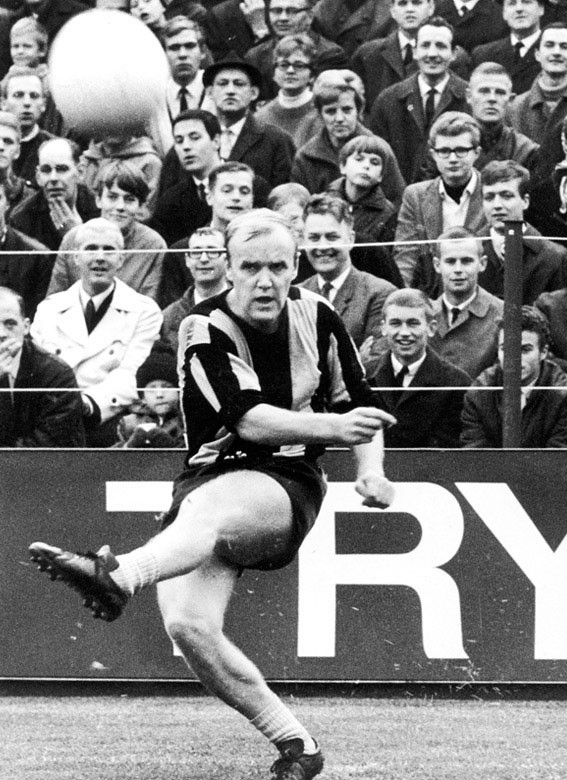
Skoglund taking a corner for Hammarby in a game against Sandvikens IF in 1966.

Lennart Skoglund's ball-control, left foot and distribution made him a big favourite with the fans. During his transformation from a young inside-left to a left winger, Skoglund managed to balance his individual dribbling skills with a perception of the game. He also possessed a shot with scoring efficiency. Skoglund was known as a set-piece specialist throughout his career.

He was though sometimes considered as a selfish player, or a "soloist". Among his weaknesses were also a limited physical durability, inconsistency and lack of stamina.

During his early years, Skoglund's style of play was compared to the likes of Sven Rydell and Henry "Garvis" Carlsson, at the time both celebrated star players in the Sweden national team.

== Personal life ==
=== Family and relationships ===
Both of Skoglund's brothers would later move on to represent Hammarby IF at senior level. His older brother Georg "Jojje" Skoglund briefly played for the club in the Swedish second tier. The youngest sibling, Karl-Evert "Ya" Skoglund, would however enjoy a far more successful career, also winning one cap for the Sweden national team. As a forward, Karl-Evert played 202 games for Hammarby between 1956 and 1966, scoring 80 goals.

In August 1952, Lennart Skoglund married the Italian model Nuccia Zirelli in Milano. The couple had two sons, Evert (b. 1953) and Giorgio (b. 1957). Both of them would later pursue a career in football, with Evert Skoglund representing Inter Milan during the 1970s and the younger son, Giorgio, briefly playing for city rivals A.C. Milan. To distinguish them, Evert was known as Skoglund I and Giorgio as Skoglund II. Skoglund had two sons outside the marriage. One son was born 1949 was adopted and Peter, who was born in 1959 and raised in Sweden.

In the early 1960s, Zirelli and Skoglund divorced. Just before his return to Sweden and Hammarby in 1963, Skoglund was involved in a serious car accident. Driving to Florence along with his two sons, his vehicle left the road and went down an escarpment. The family had to be rescued by passing motorists, and the children spent around three weeks in a hospital.

Several of Skoglund's later descendants also became professional athletes. His grandson Jimmie Ölvestad played ice hockey in the National Hockey League (NHL) and represented Sweden at international level. Albin Skoglund, the grandson of Skoglunds's brother "Ya", is also a professional footballer.

=== Outside football ===
In his early years, before turning professional, Skoglund earned his living from working as an electrician. He, however, had trouble keeping jobs since he enjoyed a festive lifestyle, being a frequent guest at different night clubs and dance halls at Södermalm.

During his tenure at Inter Milan, Skoglund earned approximately 2 million Swedish crowns in total. Still, Skoglund often struggled with his finances. The unsuspecting Skoglund reportedly got scammed from the major part of his funds by friends and acquaintances. Together with his wife Nuccia, Skoglund opened a restaurant in Milano. The establishment was named "Bar Nacka" and provided some economic stability for his family during the 1950s. But in 1958, the couple sued their financial adviser since the bar they owned at Via Paolo Sapri was heavily in the red.

Skoglund also pursued a career in music, mainly because he was in dire need of money. In the aftermath of his success at the 1958 FIFA World Cup, Skoglund released the record "Vi hänger med" (in English: "We are tagging along"). The song was written and produced by Stig "Stikkan" Anderson, who later would become the manager of the highly successful Swedish pop band ABBA. The song reached No. 7 at the Swedish charts and became the first of Skoglund's six musical releases.

During the summer breaks in Sweden, Skoglund used to tour around folkparks in Sweden, singing his songs and doing his famed "Two-Crown"-stunt – where he would drop a coin from his hand and kick it into his shirt pocket.

Upon his return to Sweden and Hammarby in 1964, Skoglund struggled both financially and socially, which affected his performances on the pitch. To help him out, the club's manager, also the owner of a carpet shop, offered him a job. For two months during the late 1960s, Skoglund worked as a carpet salesman.

=== Health problems ===
During his whole life, Skoglund suffered from severe alcoholism. In Italy, Skoglund also developed a pill abuse. Even before his arrival in Milan, the club's board had started raising questions about his lifestyle, and his quick rise to stardom appeared to exacerbate the problem. Skoglund reportedly began to keep a bottle of whisky in his locker at Inter Milan to ensure he could drink during the day. Francesco Morini, his teammate at Sampdoria, also discovered that Skoglund kept a small bottle of whisky by the corner flag. When Skoglund took a corner he would, according to Morini, kneel down as though tying his shoelace and have a drink.

His drinking also brought some legal issues. In January 1952, Skoglund got into an argument with a taxi driver who later took him to court in Milan, complaining that he had vandalised his cab. Back in Sweden, after his retirement from football, Skoglund lost his driver's license due to drunk driving when en route to promote his music recordings.

== Later years and death ==
After retiring from football, in 1968, Skoglund struggled to find meaning in his life. He got hesitant to be seen in public and mostly stayed inside his small apartment at Katarina Bangata in Södermalm. In 1970, he sought help from the sobriety organization Länkarna in Solna. But his efforts to quit drinking kept failing. Skoglund's former teammate Ronnie Hellström said that he had "become hugely agoraphobic" as the "self-confidence had drained out of him". At age 42, Skoglund went into early retirement, forced to live on social welfare.

To provide for himself, Skoglund took on a job shovelling snow. In 1972, he met a young girl with whom he fell in love. Seeking to give him a future, she secured him work in a bookshop. She battled to save him but when she discovered he was drinking in secret, he was left alone again. His mother, Linnéa, soon became his most regular companion. She would later say the following on her son's last years in life:

We were always together. We lived completely isolated. Lennart had no real friends, not even during his successful years. He was the loneliest man in the world.

On 8 July 1975, Skoglund was found dead on his kitchen floor, aged 45. Around 2,000 people attended his funeral at Skogskyrkogården in southern Stockholm.

== Legacy ==
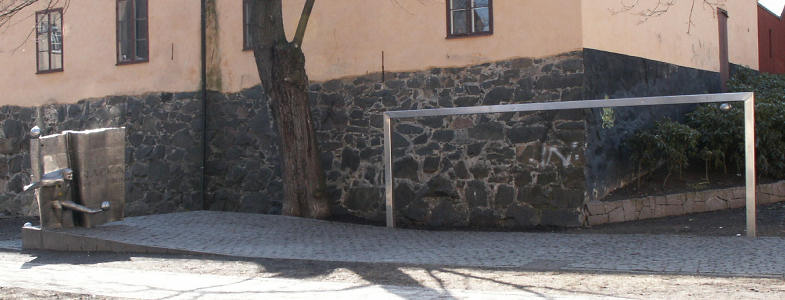
The statue "Nacka's Corner" at Södermalm in Stockholm.

In 1958, Skoglund was given the honorary award Stora Grabbars Märke, the "Big Boys Badge", which is given to participants of all sports for the fulfillment of some criteria.

In 2004, he was voted as Hammarby's biggest profile throughout the history of the club. He also got inducted as a member of the Swedish football Hall of Fame in 2006. In 2017, Skoglund was named as the single best player to have originated from Stockholm during the last century, in a vote held by the county's football association and Sveriges Radio.

A statue was raised in his honour outside his childhood home at Katarina Bangata in 1984. The monument was designed by artist Olle Aldrin and got named Vi ses vid målet (in English: "See you at the goal"). In 2000, the square in Södermalm where the statue is located officially got named "Nackas Hörna" (in English: "Nacka's Corner") – a play with words with reference to his famous goal in his comeback for Hammarby, where he shot a corner kick straight into goal.

Every 24 December, on Skoglund's birthday, hundreds of people gather at the statue to celebrate his memory. At this date the Swedes also celebrate Christmas and during the gathering, who mostly is visited by supporters of Hammarby, a speech is held to commemorate and remember Skoglund's performances on the football pitch.

Massimo Moratti, chairman of Inter Milan between 1995 and 2013, dubbed Skoglund as one of the club's biggest profiles throughout its history, together with Antonio Valentín Angelillo and Ronaldo. Moratti said the following regarding the talent of the Swedish winger:

Skoglund was a player who possessed extraordinary qualities of his time; he was the one who did not follow the tactics but instead offered the unexpected.

== Career statistics ==
=== International ===
Appearances and goals by national team and year
National team	Year	Apps	Goals
Sweden	1950	4	0
Sweden	1951	0	0
Sweden	1952	0	0
Sweden	1953	0	0
Sweden	1954	0	0
Sweden	1955	0	0
Sweden	1956	0	0
Sweden	1957	0	0
Sweden	1958	6	1
Sweden	1959	0	0
Sweden	1960	0	0
Sweden	1961	0	0
Sweden	1962	0	0
Sweden	1963	0	0
Sweden	1964	1	0
Total		11	1

Scores and results list Sweden's goal tally first, score column indicates score after each Skoglund goal.

List of international goals scored by Lennart Skoglund
No.	Date	Venue	Opponent	Score	Result	Competition	Ref.
1	24 June 1958	Ullevi, Gothenburg, Sweden	West Germany	1–1	3–1	1958 FIFA World Cup	

== Honours ==
AIK

- Svenska Cupen: 1950

Inter Milan

- Serie A: 1952–53, 1953–54

Sweden

- FIFA World Cup runner-up: 1958
- FIFA World Cup third place: 1950
