= Renica =

Renica is an Italian surname. Notable people with the surname include:

- Alessandro Renica (born 1962), Italian footballer and manager
- Giovanni Renica (1808–1884), Italian painter
- Umberto Renica (1921–1975), Italian footballer
