= Bruno Mazza =

Italian footballer (1924–2012)

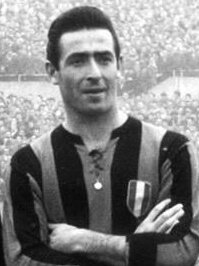

Personal information
- Date of birth: 3 June 1924
- Place of birth: Crema, Kingdom of Italy
- Date of death: 25 July 2012 (aged 88)
- Position: Midfielder

Senior career*
Years	Team	Apps	(Gls)
1941–1942	Crema		
1942–1943	Milano	3	(1)
1942–1943	→ Cremonese (loan)	8	(3)
1944	Como	2	(0)
1945–1948	Crema		
1948–1949	Genoa	21	(4)
1949–1951	Lucchese	66	(20)
1951–1952	Legnano	32	(2)
1952–1955	Internazionale	83	(7)
1955–1956	Fiorentina	4	(0)
1956–1957	Bari	24	(0)

International career
1953	Italy	1	(0)
- * Club domestic league appearances and goals

Bruno Mazza (Italian pronunciation: [ˈbruːno ˈmattsa]; 3 June 1924 – 25 July 2012) was an Italian professional footballer who played as a midfielder.

== Honours ==
Inter

- Serie A champion: 1952–53, 1953–54.

Fiorentina

- Serie A champion: 1955–56.
