= Ivano Blason =

Italian footballer (1923–2002)

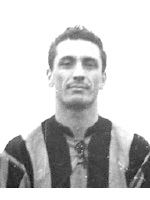
- Blason in the 1950s

Personal information
- Date of birth: 24 May 1923
- Place of birth: San Lorenzo di Mossa, Italy
- Date of death: 13 March 2002 (aged 78)
- Position: Defender

Senior career*
Years	Team	Apps	(Gls)
1939–1944	Pro Gorizia	11	(?)
1945–1950	Triestina	149	(12)
1950–1954	Inter Milan	85	(5)
1954–1955	Verona	15	(1)
1955–1962	Padova	176	(3)

International career
1950	Italy	1	(0)
- * Club domestic league appearances and goals

Ivano Blason (Italian pronunciation: [iˈvaːno blaˈzon]; 24 May 1923 – 13 March 2002) was an Italian footballer. He was a defender, who is credited with being one of the first sweepers in world football. He represented Italy at the 1950 FIFA World Cup.

== Club career ==
After starting his career with Pro Gorizia in 1939, Blason made a name for himself with Triestina, making his debut in the Italian top–flight during the 1945–46 season. He was one of the main figures during the team's historic second–place finish in the league during the 1947–48 season, behind the famous Grande Torino side. He remained with the team until 1950, when he joined Inter Milan, winning two consecutive league titles between 1952 and 1954. After a season with Verona in Serie B, he joined Padova in Serie A, where he remained for seven seasons, contributing to the team's third–place finish during the 1957–58 season.

== International career ==
Blason took part at the 1950 FIFA World Cup in Brazil with Italy, and made his only international appearance during the tournament, which came in a 2–0 win over Paraguay on 2 July.

== Style of play ==
A defender, Blason was known his physical strength, man–marking ability, and for being a hard but fair player. He was capable of playing in several defensive roles, and often played as a full-back in the WM system or sistema, which at the time was similar to the role of the modern centre-back; however, he was later also used as a sweeper, and is credited by Andrea Schianchi of La Gazzetta dello Sport with being the first official libero in Italian football when he was deployed in this role with Inter under manager Alfredo Foni, and subsequently at Padova under manager Nereo Rocco; in this position, he was often the deepest player on the team positioned behind the back-line, who would clear balls away from the penalty area. During his time at Inter under Foni, in addition to his roles as a full-back and sweeper, he was also used as a centre-half-back, a role known as the centromediano metodista in Italy, which shared the responsibilities of a defensive midfielder and a deep-lying playmaker. Although he was primarily known to be a traditional sweeper, whose main role was to clear balls away, he was also known for his ability to start counter-attacks with long passes. In addition to his defensive skills, he was also known for his powerful shot, and often took free kicks and penalties.

== Personal life ==
Ivano Blason was born in San Lorenzo di Mossa, near Province of Gorizia.

His older brother Giacomo Blason played football professionally as well. To distinguish them, Giacomo was referred to as Blason I and Ivano as Blason II.

== Honours ==
Inter

- Serie A: 1952–53, 1953–54

Pro Gorizia

- Serie C: 1942–43
