= Albin Skoglund =

Swedish footballer

Personal information
- Full name: Albin Karl-Axel Magnusson Skoglund
- Date of birth: 1 February 1997 (age 29)
- Place of birth: Sweden
- Height: 1.83 m (6 ft 0 in)
- Position: Attacking midfielder

Team information
- Current team: Valur
- Number: 14

Youth career
- Finlandia Pallo AIF
- Häcken

Senior career*
Years	Team	Apps	(Gls)
2015–2017	Häcken	1	(0)
2017	→ Örgryte (loan)	12	(2)
2018	Varberg	9	(0)
2018	→ Oddevold (loan)	11	(0)
2019	Utsikten	27	(7)
2020	Ljungskile	25	(2)
2021–2024	Utsikten	80	(18)
2024–	Valur	48	(6)

International career
2013–2014	Sweden U17	13	(5)
2015	Sweden U19	1	(0)
- * Club domestic league appearances and goals as of 16 November 2026

Albin Karl-Axel Magnusson Skoglund (born 1 February 1997) is a Swedish footballer who plays for Icelandic club Valur.

== Club career ==
On 21 December 2020, Skoglund agreed to return to Utsikten on a two-year contract. On August 12. 2024, news broke that Skoglund had signed for Icelandic giants Valur on a two year contract.

== Personal life ==
He is the grandson and grand-nephew of former professional footballers Karl-Evert "Ya" Skoglund and Lennart "Nacka" Skoglund respectively.
