= Alfredo Foni =

Italian footballer (1911–1985)

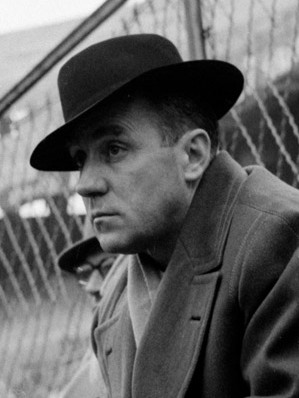
- Foni in 1950s

Personal information
- Date of birth: 20 January 1911
- Place of birth: Udine, Italy
- Date of death: 28 January 1985 (aged 74)
- Place of death: Lugano, Switzerland
- Height: 1.72 m (5 ft 8 in)
- Position: Defender

Senior career*
Years	Team	Apps	(Gls)
1927–1929	Udinese		
1929–1931	Lazio	39	(2)
1931–1934	Padova		
1934–1947	Juventus	266	(5)

International career
1936–1942	Italy	23	(0)

Managerial career
- 1947–1948: Venezia
- 1948–1949: Chiasso
- 1950–1951: Sampdoria
- 1952–1955: Inter Milan
- 1954–1958: Italy
- 1960–1961: Roma
- 1961: Chiasso
- 1964–1967: Switzerland
- 1968–1969: Inter Milan
- 1970–1971: Bellinzona
- 1972–1973: Mantova
- 1974–1975: Lugano
- 1976–1977: Lugano
Medal record
Italy
Summer Olympics
Gold medal – first place	1936 Berlin
FIFA World Cup
Gold medal – first place	1938 France
- * Club domestic league appearances and goals

Alfredo Foni (Italian pronunciation: [alˈfreːdo ˈfɔːni]; 20 January 1911 – 28 January 1985) was an Italian footballer in the 1930s and later on a coach, who played as a defender. He is one of only four players to have won both an Olympic gold medal and the FIFA World Cup with the Italy national team.

== Club career ==
Foni was born in Udine, and he made his professional debut with local club Udinese at the age of 16, in 1927, in the Prima Divisione (the predecessor to the Italian Serie A); he later moved to Lazio in 1929. He later moved to Padova for a brief stint after a few seasons in Roma.

Foni later transferred to Juventus in 1934, replacing Virginio Rosetta. Along with teammate Pietro Rava at the Turin club, he formed one of the best defensive partnerships in Italy, and in the world, as they went on to win the 1936 Summer Olympics and 1938 FIFA World Cup with Italy, as well as the 1935 League title with Juventus, as well as two Coppa Italia titles in 1938 and 1942. He remained with the club until 1947, and between 1934 and 1947, he never missed a single match for seven consecutive seasons.

In total, he made 266 League appearances with Juventus, and 370 total appearances in Serie A, after making his debut in the competition on 2 February 1930, with Lazio, against Pro Vercelli. He moved to play with Chiasso during the 1948–49 season, making only three appearances in the league, before retiring.

== International career ==
Foni made his international debut with Italy on 3 August 1936, at the Summer Olympic Games in Berlin, in a 1–0 win over the United States, helping Italy to win a gold medal in the competition.

He became a permanent member of the starting line-up at the 1938 FIFA World Cup, replacing Roma full-back Eraldo Monzeglio, starting alongside his Juventus team-mate Rava, and helping Italy to defend their World Cup title. He ended his international career in 1942, with 23 appearances; along with Pietro Rava, Sergio Bertoni, and Ugo Locatelli, Foni is one of only four Italian players ever to win both the Olympic tournament and the World Cup.

== Coaching career ==
Following his retirement, he coached in Italy and Switzerland, although Italy failed to qualify for the 1958 World Cup. He won two consecutive scudetti with Inter Milan in 1953 and 1954, and the Inter-Cities Fairs Cup with Roma in 1961. He later coached Switzerland in the 1966 FIFA World Cup.

== Style of management ==
Foni is known for having used the catenaccio tactic successfully during his time as Inter's manager in the 1950s; unlike Nereo Rocco's version of the system, however, Foni's teams's strong defensive play off the ball did not limit the offensive manner in which his team played while in possession of the ball. In his system, his team's right winger, Gino Armano, would drop back to mark the opposing the team's left winger (essentially acting as a tornante), allowing Ivano Blason, the right-back, to shift across and act as a sweeper and clear balls away.

== Death ==
Foni died in Lugano, Switzerland.

== Honours ==
=== Player ===
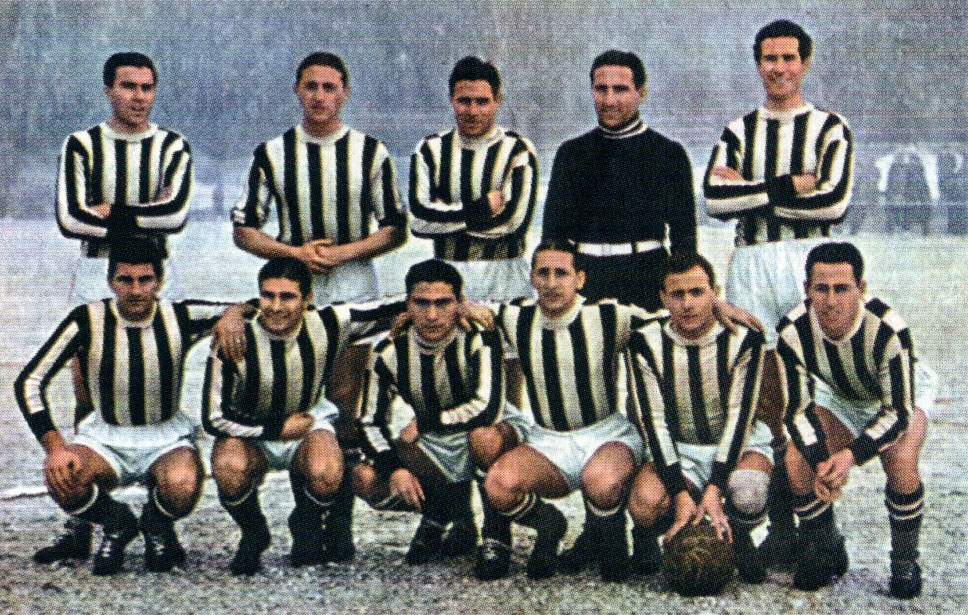
Foni (standing, centre) with Juventus in the 1940–41 season

Juventus

- Serie A: 1934–35
- Coppa Italia: 1937–38, 1941–42

Italy

- Olympic Gold Medal: 1936
- FIFA World Cup: 1938

=== Coach ===
Inter Milan

- Serie A: 1952–53, 1953–54

Roma

- Inter-Cities Fairs Cup: 1960–61
