= Guido Vincenzi =

Italian footballer (1932–1997)

Personal information
- Date of birth: 14 July 1932
- Place of birth: Quistello, Italy
- Date of death: 14 August 1997 (aged 65)
- Height: 1.85 m (6 ft 1 in)
- Position: Defender

Senior career*
Years	Team	Apps	(Gls)
1950–1953	Reggiana	63	(0)
1953–1958	Inter Milan	101	(4)
1958–1969	Sampdoria	297	(7)
Total		461	(11)

International career
1954–1958	Italy	3	(0)
- * Club domestic league appearances and goals

Guido Vincenzi (Italian pronunciation: [ˈɡwiːdo vinˈtʃɛntsi]; 14 July 1932 – 14 August 1997) was an Italian football player and manager who played as a defender.

== Playing career ==
Vincenzi began his career with Reggiana in 1950. Just after reaching twenty-one years of age he left the club, which was in Serie C at the time, and made his way to Inter Milan, who had just been crowned the Italian champions in 1953. At Inter he quickly became a starter, and in three months, he made his Serie A debut. After just 13 games with the club, he earned his first cap for the national team in a 4–1 friendly win against France in 1954, putting on an impeccable performance in his 'Azzurri' debut in Paris. His other outings with the national team were less fortunate however. His second game was a loss to Switzerland at the 1950 World Cup (of the 17 players that saw action he was the youngest) and his third cap was a loss in Belfast preventing qualification for the 1958 World Cup in Sweden. After having won a Serie A championship with Inter, he moved to Sampdoria in 1958, obtaining 297 appearances in 11 seasons, and becoming the fifth leading player for the 'blucerchiati' in this category, behind only Roberto Mancini, Pietro Vierchowod, Moreno Mannini, and Gaudenzio Bernasconi.

== Coaching career ==
After his playing career, Vincenzi tried coaching Sampdoria in the 1973–74 season, finishing 13th in the league and successfully remaining in Serie A.

== Death ==
Vincenzi died of a rare form of muscular dystrophy in 1997.
