= Sergio Brighenti =

Italian football player and coach (1932–2022)

Personal information
- Date of birth: 23 September 1932
- Place of birth: Modena, Italy
- Date of death: 10 October 2022 (aged 90)
- Place of death: Arluno, Italy
- Position: Striker

Senior career*
Years	Team	Apps	(Gls)
1949–1952	Modena	52	(19)
1952–1955	Internazionale	40	(20)
1955–1957	Triestina	54	(13)
1957–1960	Padova	91	(50)
1960–1963	Sampdoria	95	(43)
1963–1964	Modena	30	(10)
1964–1965	Torino	1	(0)
Total		363	(155)

International career
1959–1961	Italy	9	(2)

Managerial career
- 1968–1969: Varese
- 1971–1972: Varese
- 1972–1973: Seregno
- 1973–1974: Lecco
- * Club domestic league appearances and goals

Sergio Brighenti (Italian pronunciation: [ˈsɛrdʒo briˈɡɛnti]; 23 September 1932 – 10 October 2022) was an Italian football player and coach. As a professional player, Brighenti played as a forward at both club and international levels before beginning his coaching career.

== Playing career ==
Brighenti made his professional debut in 1949 and played for Modena, Internazionale, Triestina, Padova, Sampdoria and Torino, winning two consecutive Serie A titles with Inter in 1953 and 1954. Brighenti scored a total of 155 goals in 363 career league games. He was also top-scorer in Serie A once throughout his career, during the 1960–61 season, scoring 27 goals.

Brighenti also earned nine caps for Italy between 1959 and 1961, scoring two goals.

== Style of play ==
Brighenti was a quick, hardworking, and dynamic centre-forward with good technical ability and a powerful, accurate shot, who was known for his team–play as well as his eye for goal; as such, his role was more akin to that of a "centravanti di manovra," in Italian football jargon (literally translating to "manoeuvring centre-forward"), which was similar to that of a second striker, and a precursor to the modern false 9 roles.

== Coaching career ==
Brighenti retired as a player in 1965 and began his first football management job with Varese in 1968. Brighenti was manager at Varese twice and also managed Seregno and Lecco.

== Personal life and death ==
Sergio Brighenti was born in Modena on 23 September 1932. His older brother was fellow player Renato Brighenti.

Brighenti died on 10 October 2022 at the age of 90.

== Honours ==
Inter Milan

- Serie A: 1952–53, 1953–54

Individual

- Serie A top scorer: 1960–61
