= Umberto Renica =

Italian footballer

Personal information
- Date of birth: 8 April 1921
- Place of birth: Bergamo, Italy
- Date of death: 29 June 1975 (aged 54)
- Place of death: Bergamo, Italy
- Position: Midfielder

Senior career*
Years	Team	Apps	(Gls)
1939–1940	Ardens Bergamo		
1940–1941	Pro Palazzolo		
1941–1942	Brescia	3	(0)
1942–1943	Lecco	27	(22)
1945–1946	Lecco	22	(6)
1946–1947	Roma	26	(2)
1947–1948	Como	24	(4)
1948–1956	Novara	219	(36)
- * Club domestic league appearances and goals

Umberto Renica (8 April 1921 – 29 June 1975) was an Italian professional football player.

He played for 9 seasons (245 games, 38 goals) in the Serie A for A.S. Roma and Novara Calcio.
