= Sebastiano Buzzin =

Italian footballer and coach

Personal information
- Date of birth: December 24, 1929
- Place of birth: Cormons, Italy
- Date of death: December 17, 2007 (aged 77)
- Place of death: Locarno, Switzerland
- Position: Striker

Senior career*
Years	Team	Apps	(Gls)
1948–1950	Pro Gorizia		
1950–1951	Pavia		
1951–1952	Vigevano		
1952–1954	Internazionale	20	(5)
1954–1955	Fiorentina	17	(3)
1955–1956	Verona	32	(14)
1956–1960	Catania	136	(33)
1960–1961	Siracusa	20	(6)
1961–1962	Bellinzona		
1962–1963	Locarno		
1964	Montreal Cantalia		

Managerial career
- 1962–1963: Locarno
- 1964: Montreal Cantalia
- 1965–1966: Chieti
- 1965: Montreal Italica
- 1971: Montreal Olympique
- * Club domestic league appearances and goals

Sebastiano Buzzin (December 24, 1929 in Cormons – December 17, 2007 in Locarno, Switzerland) was an Italian professional football player and coach.

== Managerial career ==
In 1964, he served as a player-coach for Montreal Cantalia in the National Soccer League. The following season he was the head coach for Montreal Italica in the Eastern Canada Professional Soccer League.

On June 15, 1971 he was named the head coach for the Montreal Olympique in the North American Soccer League.

== Honours ==
- Serie A champion: 1952/53, 1953/54.
