= István Nyers =

Hungarian footballer (1924–2005)

Personal information
- Full name: István Nyers
- Date of birth: 25 May 1924
- Place of birth: Freyming-Merlebach, France
- Date of death: 9 March 2005 (aged 80)
- Place of death: Subotica, Serbia and Montenegro
- Positions: Winger; forward

Youth career
- 1941–1942: III. Kerületi TVE
- 1942–1943: Kábelgyári SC

Senior career*
Years	Team	Apps	(Gls)
1943–1944	Szabadkai VAC		
1944–1945	Ganz	9	(3)
1945	ŽAK Subotica	0	(0)
1945–1946	Újpest	22	(20)
1946	Viktoria Žižkov	3	(1)
1946–1948	Stade Français	62	(34)
1948–1954	Inter Milan	182	(133)
1954–1956	Roma	54	(20)
1956–1957	Barcelona	0	(0)
1957	Terrassa	11	(5)
1958	Sabadell	0	(0)
1959–1960	Lecco	36	(11)
1960–1961	Marzotto	12	(2)

International career
1945–1946	Hungary	2	(2)
- * Club domestic league appearances and goals

István Nyers (Hungarian pronunciation: [ˈiʃtvaːn ˈɲɛrʃ]; 25 March 1924 – 9 March 2005), also known as Stefano Nyers, was a footballer who played as a forward or as a winger. Born in France, he represented Hungary internationally. Although he played in only two international matches for Hungary, he is considered one of the greatest football legends of his country, reaching the peak of his career in the 1940s and 1950s.

== Career ==
Nyers was born in Freyming-Merlebach, Moselle, France into an immigrant Hungarian mining family; his younger brother was Ferenc Nyers. When he was 14 he moved with his family to Budapest where he started playing with III. Kerületi TVE. He will have his first official debut aged 17 and playing with Szabadkai VAC which was a Yugoslav club from Subotica that played in the Hungarian league system after the Hungarian annexation of Bačka during World War II (1941–1944). When Yugoslavs retook Subotica, Nyers moved to Budapest where he had a short spell with Ganz-MÁVAG SE where he played along László Kubala. In March 1945, Nyers played some friendlies for ŽAK Subotica (formerly Szabadkai VAC), before the club got disbanded by new Yugoslav authorities. Its players stayed together and went on a tour throughout Serbia as a representing team of Subotica. Nyers scored several goals on this tour. Later that year, Nyers left Yugoslavia and returned to Budapest, where he joined 1945 Újpest FC, winning two league titles. In 1946, he transferred briefly to the Czechoslovak team FK Viktoria Žižkov and then to the French club Stade Français.

After two years in Paris he was recruited by Italian side Inter Milan. Here he developed to one of the strongest forwards in the history of Serie A. With 26 goals in his first season he became the top scorer of the league. In 182 games for Inter he scored a total of 133 goals. Twice, in 1953 and 1954, he became Italian champion with Inter. After have been the top foreign scorer in Serie A in Inter history for more than 70 years he was surpassed in 2024 by Lautaro Martinez, and he still remains third overall behind only Benito Lorenzi and Giuseppe Meazza.

After winning the championship for the second time Nyers left Milan for AS Roma, where he remained for two years. A season with the Catalan sides CF Barcelona, Terrassa FC and CD Sabadell followed before he played out the remainder of his career with minor league Italian clubs.

Nyers retired from the professional game in 1961. During his retirement he lived for several years in Milan before settling in Subotica, Serbia until his death in 2005 at the age of 80.

== Honours ==
Újpest

- Nemzeti Bajnokság I: 1945, 1945–46

Internazionale

- Serie A: 1952–53, 1953–54

Barcelona

- Copa del Rey: 1957

Individual

- Serie A Team of The Year: 1951, 1952
