= Benito Lorenzi =

Italian footballer (1925-2007)

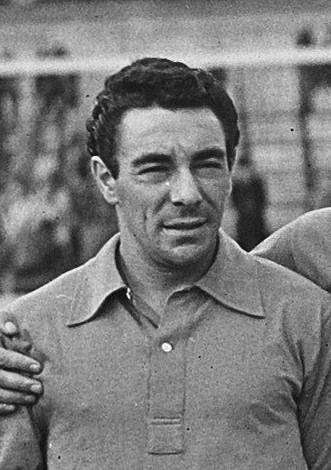
- Lorenzi in 1953

Personal information
- Full name: Benito Lorenzi
- Date of birth: 20 December 1925
- Place of birth: Borgo a Buggiano, Italy
- Date of death: 3 March 2007 (aged 81)
- Place of death: Milan, Italy
- Position: Striker

Youth career
- 1945–1946: Borgo a Buggiano

Senior career*
Years	Team	Apps	(Gls)
1946–1947	Empoli	40	(15)
1947–1958	Inter	314	(143)
1958–1959	Alessandria	25	(4)
1959–1960	Brescia	14	(4)
1960	Varese	9	(1)
Total		402	(167)

International career
1949–1954	Italy	14	(4)
1950	Italy B	1	(0)
- * Club domestic league appearances and goals

Benito "Veleno" Lorenzi (Italian pronunciation: [beˈniːto veˈleːno loˈrɛntsi]; 20 December 1925 – 3 March 2007) was an Italian footballer born in Borgo a Buggiano, province of Pistoia. He played as a striker.

== Club career ==
Throughout his career (1947–1960), Lorenzi played with Italian clubs Inter and Alessandria in Serie A, Empoli and Brescia in Serie B, and Varese in Serie C. He won two back to back Italian league titles (in 1953 and 1954) with Inter, and scored 143 goals in 314 games in official matches.

== International career ==
With the Italian team, Lorenzi scored 4 goals in 14 appearances between 1949 and 1954. He participated in the 1950 and 1954 FIFA World Cups with Italy.

== Death ==
Lorenzi died on 3 March 2007 at Sacco Hospital, Milan; he was 81 years old.

== Honours ==
Inter

- Serie A: 1952–53, 1953–54
