= 1953–54 Serie A =

51st season of top-tier Italian football

Serie A
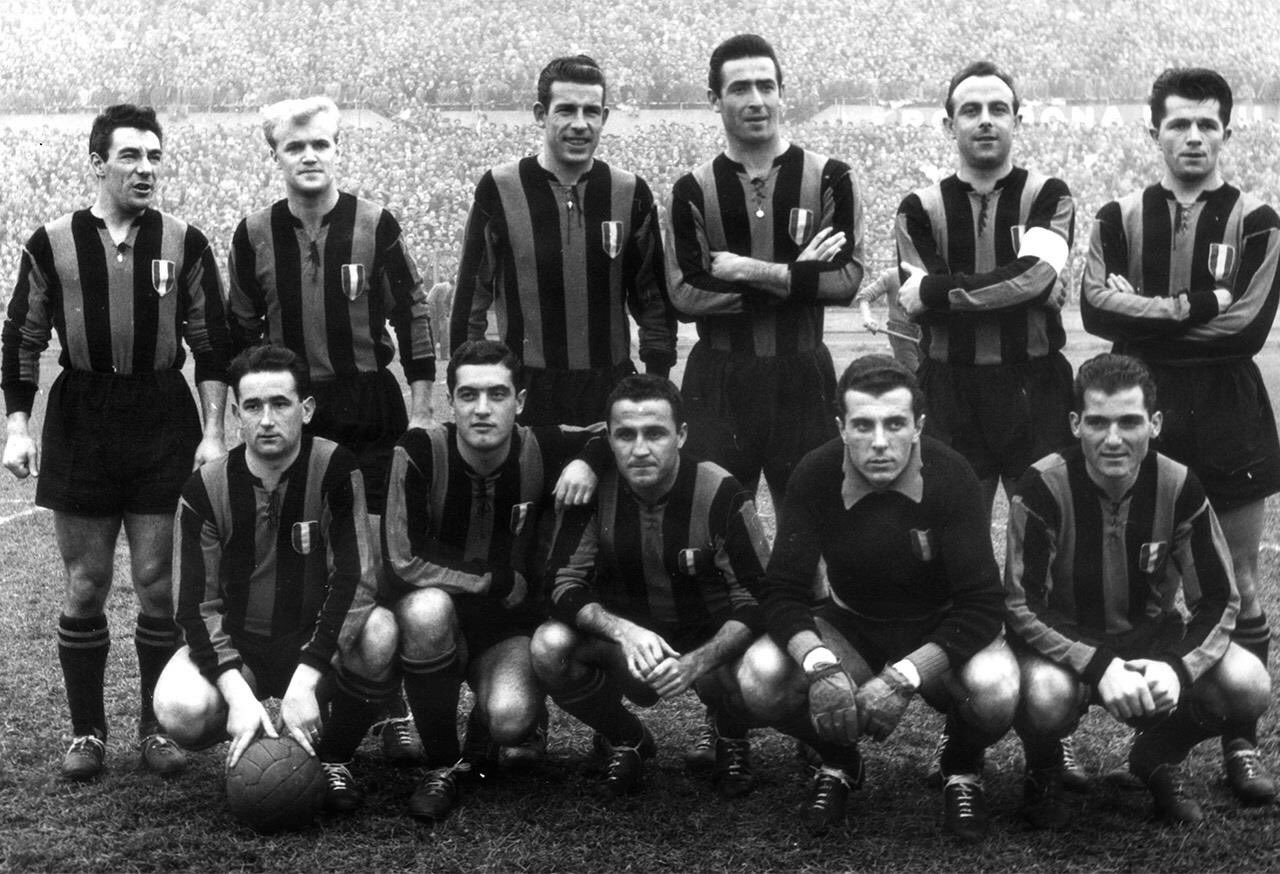
- Football Club Internazionale
- Season: 1953–54
- Champions: Internazionale; 7th title
- Relegated: Palermo; Legnano
- Matches: 306
- Goals: 825 (2.7 per match)
- Top goalscorer: Gunnar Nordahl (23 goals)

The 1953-54 Serie A was the fifty-second edition of the Italian Football Championship. It was the twenty-first Italian Football Championship branded Serie A, since Serie A was launched in 1929. This was the twenty-eighth season from which the Italian Football Champions adorned their team jerseys in the subsequent season with a Scudetto. Internazionale were champions for the second of two consecutive wins, and for the seventh time in their history. This was their fifth scudetto since the scudetto started being awarded in 1924, and their fifth win contested as Serie A.

== Teams ==
Genoa and Legnano had been promoted from Serie B.

Serie A 1953-54 team distribution

== Final classification ==
Pos	Team	Pld	W	D	L	GF	GA	GD	Pts	Qualification or relegation
1	Internazionale (C)	34	20	11	3	67	32	+35	51	
2	Juventus	34	20	10	4	58	34	+24	50	
3	Milan	34	17	10	7	66	39	+27	44	
3	Fiorentina	34	15	14	5	45	27	+18	44	
5	Napoli	34	13	12	9	52	38	+14	38	
6	Roma	34	12	12	10	53	42	+11	36	
7	Bologna	34	14	8	12	50	41	+9	36	
8	Sampdoria	34	11	12	11	38	40	−2	34	
9	Torino	34	9	15	10	37	46	−9	33	
10	Atalanta	34	10	11	13	54	53	+1	31	
11	Lazio	34	10	9	15	40	42	−2	29	
12	Genoa	34	10	8	16	36	50	−14	28	
12	Triestina	34	9	10	15	42	64	−22	28	
14	Novara	34	8	11	15	34	50	−16	27	
15	Udinese	34	8	10	16	39	57	−18	26	Relegation tie-breaker
16	SPAL	34	8	10	16	33	53	−20	26	Relegation tie-breaker
17	Palermo (R)	34	9	8	17	37	59	−22	26	Serie B after tie-breaker
18	Legnano (R)	34	6	13	15	44	58	−14	25	Relegation to Serie B

Source: Panini
(C) Champions; (R) Relegated

== Results ==
Home \ Away	ATA	BOL	FIO	GEN	INT	JUV	LAZ	LEG	MIL	NAP	NOV	PAL	ROM	SAM	SPA	TOR	TRI	UDI
Atalanta		1–3	1–1	1–0	0–2	3–2	1–0	4–1	3–1	1–1	1–1	0–1	1–1	1–1	0–1	1–1	4–2	6–0
Bologna	2–1		1–1	1–1	0–1	0–1	1–0	2–0	2–1	0–0	2–0	0–1	1–2	0–2	2–1	2–0	4–0	3–1
Fiorentina	3–0	1–3		1–0	1–1	1–1	0–1	4–0	0–0	1–0	2–0	3–1	2–0	2–0	1–1	2–2	1–0	0–0
Genoa	1–0	3–3	1–3		1–3	1–3	3–1	2–1	2–2	1–1	2–0	1–0	1–0	0–1	1–0	1–1	1–0	4–1
Internazionale	3–1	3–2	2–1	1–0		6–0	2–0	2–2	3–0	2–0	3–1	4–0	1–1	2–1	4–2	2–0	4–2	0–2
Juventus	2–0	2–2	0–0	3–1	2–2		0–0	2–1	1–0	3–2	0–0	4–1	3–0	1–0	3–1	0–0	3–1	1–0
Lazio	2–2	1–1	2–3	3–0	0–1	2–1		1–1	1–1	0–4	2–1	3–0	1–2	3–0	2–1	0–1	5–1	0–1
Legnano	1–2	0–1	1–2	1–1	1–1	1–1	2–1		2–2	1–0	5–1	3–0	2–2	2–2	1–3	0–0	2–1	0–0
Milan	3–3	2–1	2–1	3–0	2–0	1–0	3–2	3–1		3–2	0–0	2–1	1–2	1–1	6–1	0–1	4–0	2–1
Napoli	6–3	2–1	0–0	0–2	2–1	1–2	2–1	1–0	0–1		5–1	3–0	1–0	1–1	3–1	2–2	1–0	2–1
Novara	0–4	1–0	0–0	2–0	2–3	0–1	2–1	0–0	1–1	1–1		3–0	2–0	3–0	4–2	1–1	2–0	0–0
Palermo	0–0	3–1	0–1	2–1	2–2	1–3	2–0	3–3	1–4	2–2	1–1		1–3	2–1	1–0	1–1	1–1	4–0
Roma	0–0	1–3	1–2	4–0	1–1	1–1	1–1	5–3	1–2	0–0	3–0	3–1		3–1	3–0	2–2	3–1	3–0
Sampdoria	2–0	2–2	2–0	0–0	0–0	0–1	0–0	3–1	2–1	1–0	3–1	2–2	2–1		0–0	1–1	2–1	1–1
SPAL	3–2	0–0	1–1	1–0	2–2	1–3	0–1	1–0	0–0	1–1	2–1	0–1	0–0	2–1		2–3	0–0	2–1
Torino	1–3	0–1	1–1	3–2	1–1	2–4	0–1	2–2	1–4	0–2	1–0	2–1	1–1	2–0	1–0		1–1	1–0
Triestina	3–2	3–1	1–1	1–1	0–0	2–2	1–1	2–1	0–6	1–1	3–1	1–0	2–2	2–1	3–0	2–1		2–1
Udinese	2–2	3–2	1–2	3–1	0–2	0–2	1–1	1–2	2–2	3–3	1–1	1–0	2–1	1–2	1–1	3–0	4–2	

Source: Almanacco Illustrato del Calcio - La Storia 1898-2004, Panini Edizioni, Modena, September 2005 (in Italian)
Legend: Blue = home team win; Yellow = draw; Red = away team win.

== Relegation tie-breaker ==
Played in Milan, Florence and Rome

Team 1	Score	Team 2
SPAL (Italy)	0-2	(Italy) Udinese
Palermo (Italy)	1-1	(Italy) Udinese
Palermo (Italy)	1-2	(Italy) SPAL

Palermo relegated to Serie B.

== Top goalscorers ==
Rank	Player	Club	Goals
1	(Sweden) Gunnar Nordahl	Milan	23
2	(Sweden) Hasse Jeppson	Napoli	19
3	(Argentina) (Italy) Eduardo Ricagni	Juventus	17
4	(Italy) Adriano Bassett	Atalanta	16
5	(Denmark) Poul Aage Rasmussen	Atalanta	15
5	(Denmark) Jørgen Leschly Sørensen	Milan	15
7	(Italy) Giampiero Boniperti	Juventus	14
8	(Italy) Gino Armano	Internazionale	13
8	(Italy) Egisto Pandolfini	Roma	13
8	(Italy) Giancarlo Bacci	Fiorentina	13
11	(Italy) Benito Lorenzi	Internazionale	12
12	(Italy) Gino Cappello	Bologna	11
12	(Italy) Gino Pivatelli	Bologna	11
14	(Italy) Amedeo Amadei	Napoli	10
14	(Italy) Nerio Manzardo	Legnano	10
14	(Sweden) Nils Liedholm	Milan	10
14	(Italy) Guido Gratton	Fiorentina	10
14	(Germany) Horst Buhtz	Torino	10
14	(Sweden) Lennart Skoglund	Internazionale	10

== References and sources ==
- Almanacco Illustrato del Calcio - La Storia 1898-2004, Panini Edizioni, Modena, September 2005
