= 1952–53 Serie A =

50th season of top-tier Italian football

Serie A
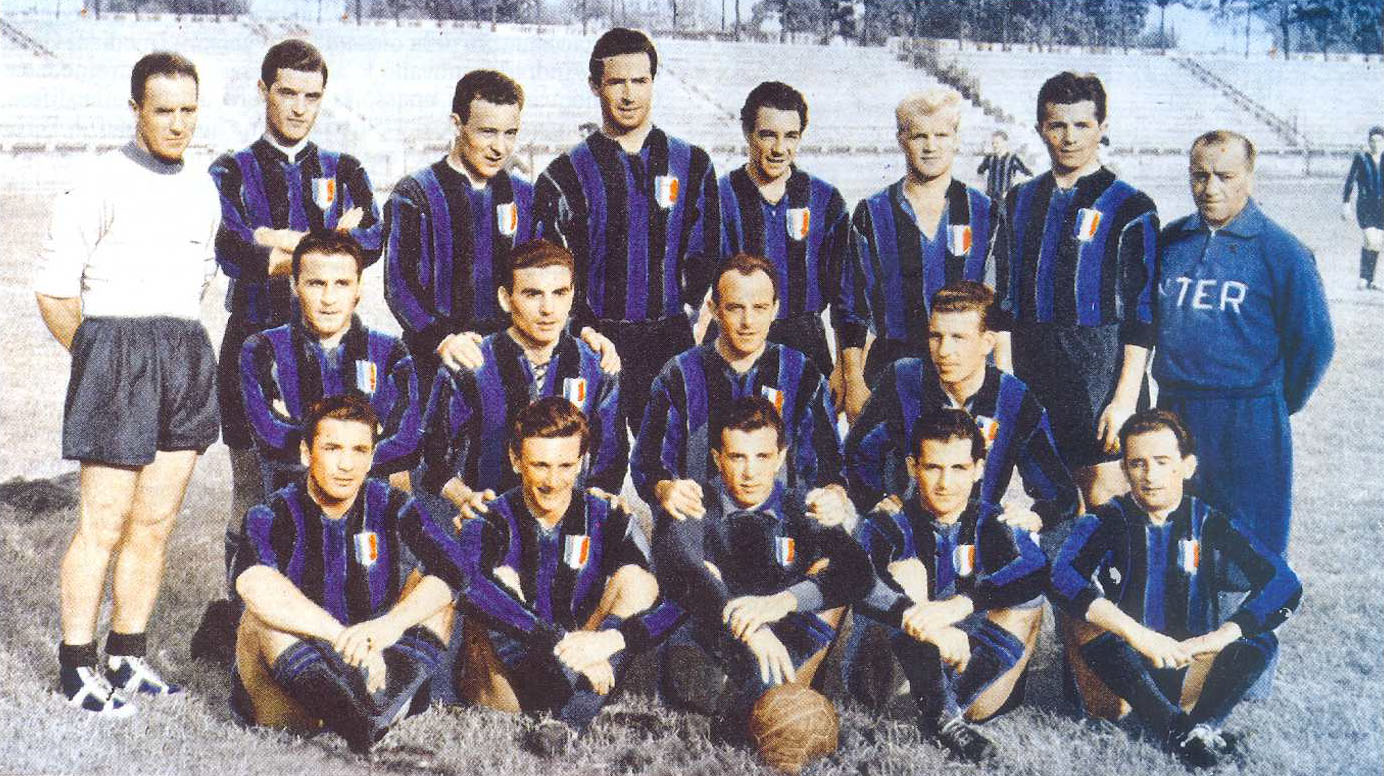
- Football Club Internazionale 1952-53
- Season: 1952–53
- Champions: Internazionale; 6th title
- Relegated: Como; Pro Patria
- Matches: 306
- Goals: 830 (2.71 per match)
- Top goalscorer: Gunnar Nordahl (26 goals)

The 1952-53 Serie A was the fifty-first edition of the Italian Football Championship. It was the twentieth Italian Football Championship branded Serie A, since Serie A was launched in 1929. This was the twenty-seventh season from which the Italian Football Champions adorned their team jerseys in the subsequent season with a Scudetto. Internazionale were champions for the first of two consecutive wins, and for the sixth time in their history. This was their fourth scudetto since the scudetto started being awarded in 1924, and their fourth win contested as Serie A.

== Teams ==
Roma had been promoted from Serie B.

Serie A 1952-53 team distribution

== Final classification ==
Pos	Team	Pld	W	D	L	GF	GA	GD	Pts	Qualification or relegation
1	Internazionale (C)	34	19	9	6	46	24	+22	47	
2	Juventus	34	18	9	7	73	40	+33	45	
3	Milan	34	17	9	8	64	34	+30	43	Qualified for the 1953 Latin Cup
4	Napoli	34	15	11	8	53	43	+10	41	
5	Bologna	34	16	7	11	52	43	+9	39	
6	Roma	34	13	10	11	50	44	+6	36	
7	Fiorentina	34	11	11	12	31	47	−16	33	
8	SPAL	34	8	16	10	40	37	+3	32	
8	Atalanta	34	10	12	12	52	53	−1	32	
10	Torino	34	11	9	14	47	50	−3	31	
10	Lazio	34	12	7	15	38	44	−6	31	
10	Sampdoria	34	9	13	12	37	43	−6	31	
10	Novara	34	11	9	14	43	52	−9	31	
10	Udinese	34	10	11	13	42	55	−13	31	
15	Triestina	34	10	10	14	47	54	−7	30	
15	Palermo	34	10	10	14	43	56	−13	30	
17	Como (R)	34	11	5	18	32	44	−12	27	Relegation to Serie B
18	Pro Patria (R)	34	7	8	19	40	67	−27	22	Relegation to Serie B

Source: Panini
(C) Champions; (R) Relegated

== Results ==
Home \ Away	ATA	BOL	COM	FIO	INT	JUV	LAZ	MIL	NAP	NOV	PAL	PPA	ROM	SAM	SPA	TOR	TRI	UDI
Atalanta		2–0	1–1	1–2	0–1	1–5	0–0	1–1	1–1	1–0	0–0	3–2	1–5	4–0	0–1	1–3	5–2	5–0
Bologna	3–1		1–0	2–1	2–0	1–0	1–1	2–0	1–3	1–0	5–2	4–1	0–1	2–0	2–1	2–2	0–1	3–1
Como	2–1	1–0		2–1	0–1	0–1	0–1	3–1	2–1	0–0	3–1	4–1	2–1	1–0	1–0	0–1	2–0	0–0
Fiorentina	1–1	1–1	2–0		1–0	1–2	0–0	0–3	2–1	1–0	0–2	2–2	2–0	2–2	1–1	0–2	2–0	1–0
Internazionale	1–0	2–1	3–1	3–0		2–0	1–1	0–0	5–1	0–1	3–0	2–1	1–0	2–1	1–1	1–3	1–0	0–0
Juventus	1–1	1–2	2–1	8–0	2–1		5–0	0–3	1–1	1–1	2–1	2–0	3–2	3–0	2–2	4–1	3–2	4–0
Lazio	0–2	1–2	2–0	0–1	1–1	0–1		0–0	2–1	1–3	2–0	3–1	1–0	0–1	3–1	2–1	4–1	1–2
Milan	5–1	1–1	4–2	2–1	0–1	1–2	3–1		2–2	2–0	5–0	4–0	4–1	2–1	1–0	5–1	4–1	0–0
Napoli	2–0	4–1	1–0	0–0	0–1	3–2	3–0	4–2		2–3	0–0	1–0	0–0	2–1	1–0	3–0	1–1	4–2
Novara	1–1	2–2	2–1	1–2	1–2	0–6	2–2	2–1	0–1		3–4	2–2	3–1	2–0	0–0	2–0	1–0	3–1
Palermo	4–2	4–1	2–0	0–0	0–3	1–1	3–1	0–1	0–0	2–1		2–0	1–1	3–0	2–2	1–1	0–0	3–2
Pro Patria	0–3	3–0	2–0	0–0	2–2	3–3	1–0	0–1	1–1	2–3	2–1		0–1	0–1	2–0	3–0	3–2	2–3
Roma	2–2	2–1	3–0	1–0	1–3	3–0	0–2	2–1	5–2	4–1	1–0	0–0		0–0	0–0	2–1	2–2	2–2
Sampdoria	0–0	1–1	1–1	4–0	2–0	1–1	1–2	2–1	0–0	1–1	4–1	1–0	2–2		2–2	1–0	3–1	1–1
SPAL	2–2	1–4	0–0	1–1	0–1	2–2	1–0	1–1	4–1	0–0	4–0	4–0	2–1	0–0		1–1	2–0	3–0
Torino	2–3	1–1	2–1	4–1	1–1	0–1	2–0	1–1	1–2	4–1	3–1	1–1	0–0	2–0	1–1		5–0	0–3
Triestina	2–2	1–0	4–1	1–1	0–0	2–1	3–0	1–1	2–3	2–0	2–1	4–0	2–3	1–1	2–0	3–0		1–1
Udinese	1–3	0–2	1–0	0–1	0–0	1–1	0–4	0–1	1–1	2–1	1–1	7–3	3–1	3–2	2–0	1–0	1–1	

Source: Almanacco Illustrato del Calcio - La Storia 1898-2004, Panini Edizioni, Modena, September 2005 (in Italian)
Legend: Blue = home team win; Yellow = draw; Red = away team win.

== Top goalscorers ==
Rank	Player	Club	Goals
1	(Sweden) Gunnar Nordahl	Milan	26
2	(Denmark) John Hansen	Juventus	22
3	(Denmark) Poul Aage Rasmussen	Atalanta	19
4	(Italy) Giancarlo Bacci	Bologna	18
5	(Italy) Pasquale Vivolo	Juventus	16
6	(Hungarian People's Republic) István Nyers	Internazionale	15
7	(Italy) Giancarlo Vitali	Napoli	14
7	(Sweden) Hasse Jeppson	Napoli	14
7	(Italy) Carlo Galli	Roma	14
10	(Italy) Quinto Bertoloni	Pro Patria	13
10	(Italy) Renzo Burini	Milan	13
10	(Italy) Marco Savioni	Novara	13
13	(Italy) Benito Lorenzi	Internazionale	12
14	(Denmark) Karl Aage Præst	Juventus	10
14	(Hungarian People's Republic) István Mike Mayer	Bologna	10
14	(Italy) Sergio Sega	SPAL	10

== References and sources ==
- Almanacco Illustrato del Calcio - La Storia 1898-2004, Panini Edizioni, Modena, September 2005
