= 1948–49 Inter Milan season =

Inter Milan
1948–49 season
- President: Carlo Masseroni
- Manager: David John Astley (until 1 February 1949); Giulio Cappelli
- Stadium: San Siro; Arena Civica (some matches)
- Serie A: Runners-up
- Top goalscorer: Nyers (26)
Home colours

During the 1948–49 season Inter Milan competed in Serie A.

== Summary ==
The campaign is best remembered for the first match won by Internazionale at Juventus since 19 March 1930.

Midfielder Enzo Bearzot, future head coach of the Italian National Football Team, debuted with the team on 21 November 1948. Other debuting players in this season included winger Gino Armano, as well as forwards Amedeo Amadei and Hungarian István Nyers who formed the offensive line with Benito Lorenzi.

The club finished second place in Serie A.

== Squad ==
- .-Source:

Note: Flags indicate national team as defined under FIFA eligibility rules; some limited exceptions apply. Players may hold more than one non-FIFA nationality.

Pos.	Nation	Player
GK	ITA	Angelo Franzosi
GK	ITA	Giuseppe Albani
DF	ITA	Franco Pian
DF	ITA	Ubaldo Passalacqua
DF	ITA	Luciano Gariboldi
DF	ITA	Attilio Giovannini
DF	ITA	Tristano Pangaro
MF	ITA	Aldo Campatelli
MF	ITA	Osvaldo Fattori
MF	ITA	Camillo Achilli
MF	ITA	Enzo Bearzot

Pos.	Nation	Player
MF	ITA	Gustavo Fiorini
MF	ITA	Raffaele Guaita
MF	ITA	Antonio Bacchetti
MF	ROU	Nicolae Simatoc
FW	ITA	Benito Lorenzi
FW	ITA	Gino Armano
FW	HUN	István Nyers
FW	ITA	Amedeo Amadei
FW	ITA	Roberto Lerici
FW	HUN	Eugen Wellish

=== Transfers ===
In
Pos.	Name	from	Type
FW	István Nyers	Stade Français	-
FW	Amedeo Amadei	AS Roma	-
FW	Gino Armano	Alessandria	-
FW	Antonio Bacchetti	Lucchese	-
MF	Attilio Giovannini	Lucchese	-

Out
Pos.	Name	To	Type
FW	Giuseppe Arezzi		
DF	Alfredo Colombo		
FW	Rinaldo Fiumi	AS Bari	
FW	Tibor Garay	Pro Patria	
FW	Giuseppe Madini		
DF	Sergio Marchi		
MF	Cosimo Muci	Vicenza	
FW	Giacomo Neri		
MF	Bruno Quaresima	Vicenza	
FW	Sergio Susmel	Como	
FW	Bibiano Zapirain	Nacional	

== Competitions ==
=== Serie A ===
==== League table ====
Pos	Team	Pld	W	D	L	GF	GA	GD	Pts	Qualification or relegation
1	Torino (C)	38	25	10	3	78	34	+44	60	1949 Latin Cup
2	Internazionale	38	22	11	5	85	39	+46	55	
3	Milan	38	21	8	9	83	52	+31	50	
4	Juventus	38	18	8	12	64	47	+17	44	
5	Sampdoria	38	16	9	13	74	63	+11	41	

Source: Panini
(C) Champions

==== Results by round ====
Round	1	2	3	4	5	6	7	8	9	10	11	12	13	14	15	16	17	18	19	20	21	22	23	24	25	26	27	28	29	30	31	32	33	34	35	36	37	38	39
Ground	H	H	A	H	A	A	H	A	H	A	H	A	H	H	A	A	H	A	H	A	H	A	H	A	H	H	A	H	A	H	A	H	A	A	H	H	A	H	A
Result	W	W	D	D	W	L	W	W	W	D	W	L	D	W	L	W	-	L	W	W	D	D	W	L	D	W	W	D	W	W	W	W	W	D	D	W	W	D	W
Position	1	1	3	3	1	3	3	1	1	2	2	3	3	1	2	2	3	4	4	3	2	3	2	2	2	2	2	2	2	2	2	2	2	2	2	2	2	2	2

Source: http://calcio-seriea.net/allenatori_squadra/1948/284/
A = Away; H = Home; W = Win; D = Draw; L = Loss; = Leader, 1949 Latin Cup; = Relegation to 1949–50 Serie B

==== Matches ====
- .- Source:http://calcio-seriea.net/partite/1948/284/

19 September 1948 1	Inter	4 – 2	Sampdoria	Milan
	Nyers 39', 55', 77'; Lorenzi 70'		28', 42' Lucentini	Stadium: San Siro; Referee: Canavesio

26 September 1948 2	Inter	5 – 0	Novara	Milan
	Della Frera 60' (o.g.); Nyers I 63' (pen.); Amadei 67'; Lorenzi 75', 89'			Stadium: San Siro; Referee: Agnolin

3 October 1948 3	SS Lazio	2 – 2	Inter	Rome
	Penzo 5'; Remondini 20'		14' Amadei; 41' Nyers	Stadium: Stadio Nazionale; Referee: Silvano

10 October 1948 4	Inter	0 – 0	Palermo	Milan
				Stadium: San Siro; Referee: Tassini

16 October 1948 5	AC Milan	0 – 2	Inter	Milan
			35' Nyers; 59' Lorenzi	Stadium: San Siro; Referee: Gemini

24 October 1948 6	Genoa	4 – 1	Inter	Genoa
	Verrina 64'; Dalla Torre 70'; Pellicari 72' (pen.); Mazza 81'		21' Armano	Stadium: Luigi Ferraris; Referee: Bernardi (Bologna)

31 October 1948 7	Inter	9 – 1	AS Bari	Milan
	Lorenzi 11'; Amadei 26', 32', 55', 64'; Nyers 38', 69'; Armano 62', 73'		60' Canonico	Stadium: San Siro; Referee: Guarda

4 November 1948 8	Juventus	0 – 1	Inter	Turin
			67' Amadei	Stadium: Comunale; Referee: Agnolin (Bassano del Grappa)

7 November 1948 9	Inter	2 – 0	Modena	Milan
	Nyers 29' (pen.); Fattori 75' Marcatori			Stadium: San Siro; Referee: Coppolone

14 November 1948 10	Pro Patria	1 – 1	Inter	Busto Arsizio
	Turconi II 76'		48' Lorenzi	Stadium: Comunale; Referee: Gemini

21 November 1948 11	Inter	3 – 1	Livorno	Milan
	Amadei 1'; Armano 5'; Nyers 13'		54' Stradella	Stadium: San Siro; Referee: Zambotto (Padua)

28 November 1948 12	AS Roma	1 – 0	Inter	Rome
	Pesaola 40'			Stadium: Stadio Nazionale; Referee: Agnolin

5 December 1948 13	Inter	2 – 2	Bologna	Milan
	Nyers 39' (pen.); Amadei 46'		22' Mike; 31' Gritti	Stadium: San Siro; Referee: Dattilo

8 December 1948 14	Inter	4 – 0	Lucchese	Milan
	Nay 20' (o.g.); Amadei 47', 72'; Nyers 53'			Stadium: San Siro; Referee: Galeati

12 December 1948 15	Torino	4 – 2	Inter	Turin
14:30 UTC+1	Mazzola 3'; Menti II 42', 72'; Ossola 53'		52' Armano; 66' (pen.) Nyers I	Stadium: Stadio Filadelfia; Attendance: 26,700; Referee: Orlandini

19 December 1948 16	Atalanta	1 – 2	Inter	Bergamo
	Gremese 49'		26' Lerici; 34' Nyers	Stadium: Comunale; Referee: Pera

26 December 1948 17	Inter	suspd.	Padova	Milan
		Report		Stadium: Arena Civica; Referee: Bruno Zilli
Note: Match suspended due to heavy fog at 68' with a 0-1 score.

2 January 1949 18	Triestina	2 – 0	Inter	Trieste
	Begni 1'; Pison 41'			Stadium: Comunale; Referee: Tassini

5 January 1949 19	Inter	7 – 1	Fiorentina	Milan
	Fiorini 10', 23'; Nyers 31' (pen.), 81'; Amadei 77', 89'; Armano 68'		13' Pandolfini	Stadium: San Siro; Referee: Galeati

9 January 1949 20	Sampdoria	0 – 4	Inter	Genoa
			62', 82' Amadei; 79' Nyers; 88' Armano	Stadium: Luigi Ferraris; Referee: Gamba

13 January 1949 17	Inter	1 – 1	Padova	Milan
	Fiorini 26'		32' Fiore	Stadium: San Siro; Referee: Pera
Note: Match re-scheduled from 26 December 1948.

16 January 1949 21	Novara	1 – 1	Inter	Novara
	Ferraris II 70'		51' Campatelli	Stadium: Comunale; Referee: Agnolin

23 January 1949 22	Inter	1 – 0	SS Lazio	Milan
	Fiorini 7'			Stadium: San Siro; Referee: Longagnani

30 January 1949 23	Palermo	2 – 1	Inter	Palermo
	Pavesi 20'; Marzani 68'		17' Armano	Stadium: La Favorita; Referee: Cambi

6 February 1949 24	Inter	4 – 4	AC Milan	Milan
	Gratton 27' (o.g.); Nyers 33', 71'; Lorenzi 66'		2' Annovazzi; 34' Sloan; 43', 52' Nordahl	Stadium: San Siro; Referee: Dattilo

13 February 1949 25	Inter	2 – 1	Genoa	Milan
	Amadei 32'; Nyers 69'		21' Odone	Stadium: San Siro; Referee: Bernardi

20 February 1949 26	AS Bari	1 – 2	Inter	Bari
	Canonico 85'		57', 59' Amadei	Stadium: della Vittoria; Referee: Bellè (Venezia)

6 March 1949 27	Inter	1 – 1	Juventus	Milan
	Amadei 10'		76' Muccinelli	Stadium: San Siro; Referee: Galeati

13 March 1949 28	Modena	2 – 3	Inter	Modena
	Giovetti 40'; Pernigo 72'		15', 29' Nyers; 34' Lorenzi	Stadium: Comunale; Referee: Gemini

20 March 1949 29	Inter	2 – 1	Pro Patria	Milan
	Lorenzi 23', 71'		37' Borra	Stadium: San Siro; Referee: Agnolin

3 April 1949 30	Livorno	0 – 2	Inter	Livorno
			16' Lorenzi; 74' Armano	Stadium: Comunale; Referee: Bertolio

10 April 1949 31	Inter	1 – 0	AS Roma	Milan
	Achilli 84'			Stadium: San Siro; Referee: Scotto

17 April 1949 32	Bologna	1 – 3	Inter	Bologna
	Mike 34'		14' Amadei; 49' (o.g.) Ballacci; 77' Nyers	Stadium: Comunale; Referee: Pieri (Trieste)

20 April 1949 33	Lucchese 1905	0 – 0	Inter	Lucca
				Stadium: Stadio Porta Elisa; Referee: Gamba

30 April 1949 34	Inter	0 – 0	Torino	Milan
16:00 UTC+1				Stadium: San Siro; Attendance: 37 000; Referee: Gemini

8 May 1949 35	Inter	4 – 0	Atalanta	Milan
	Lorenzi 35'; Amadei 77', 88'; Armano 80'			Stadium: San Siro; Referee: Galeati

15 May 1949 36	Padova	1 – 3	Inter	Padua
	Checchetti 56'		3' Lorenzi; 16' (pen.) 88' Nyers	Stadium: Silvio Appiani; Referee: Orlandini

29 May 1949 37	Inter	1 – 1	Triestina	Milan
	Lorenzi 48'		45' Ispiro	Stadium: San Siro; Referee: Silvano

5 June 1949 38	Fiorentina	0 – 2	Inter	Florence
			10' Nyers; 40' Campatelli	Stadium: Comunale; Referee: Galeati

== Statistics ==
=== Players statistics ===
No.	Pos	Nat	Player	Total		1948-49 Serie A	
No.	Pos	Nat	Player	Apps	Goals	Apps	Goals
	GK	(Italy) ITA	Angelo Franzosi	27	-26	27	-26
	DF	(Italy) ITA	Luciano Gariboldi	25	0	25	0
	DF	(Italy) ITA	Franco Pian	21	0	21	0
	DF	(Italy) ITA	Attilio Giovannini	32	0	32	0
	MF	(Italy) ITA	Aldo Campatelli	29	2	29	2
	MF	(Italy) ITA	Osvaldo Fattori	36	1	36	1
	MF	(Italy) ITA	Camillo Achilli	35	1	35	1
	FW	(Italy) ITA	Benito Lorenzi	30	14	30	14
	FW	(Italy) ITA	Gino Armano	33	10	33	10
	FW	(Hungary) HUN	István Nyers	36	26	36	26
	FW	(Italy) ITA	Amedeo Amadei	38	22	38	22
	GK	(Italy) ITA	Giuseppe Albani	11	-13	11	-13
	MF	(Italy) ITA	Raffaele Guaita	16	0	16	0
	DF	(Italy) ITA	Tristano Pangaro	13	0	13	0
	MF	(Italy) ITA	Gustavo Fiorini	11	4	11	4
	MF	(Romania) ROU	Nicolae Simatoc	10	0	10	0
	FW	(Italy) ITA	Roberto Lerici	5	1	5	1
	MF	(Italy) ITA	Enzo Bearzot	4	0	4	0
	MF	(Italy) ITA	Antonio Bacchetti	4	0	4	0
	DF	(Italy) ITA	Ubaldo Passalacqua	2	0	2	0
	FW	(Hungary) HUN	Eugen Wellish				

- Source: http://calcio-seriea.net/presenze/1948/284/
