= List of Inter Milan players (25–99 appearances) =

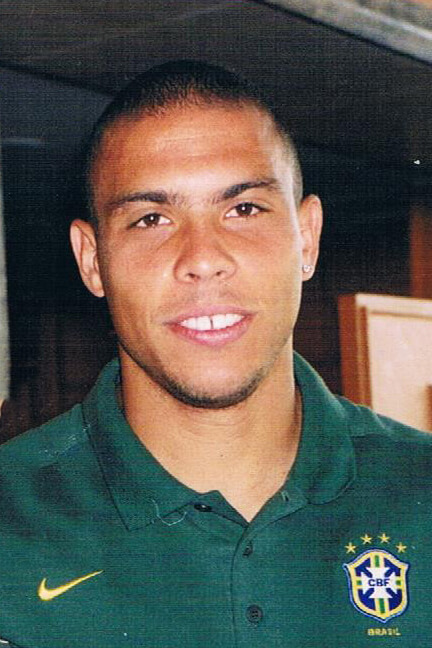
Ronaldo played 99 matches and scored 59 goals. He was part of 1997–98 UEFA Cup winning squad.

Football Club Internazionale Milano is an Italian association football club based in Milan, Lombardy. The club was formed on 9 March 1908 to allow the foreign players to play in Italy. Inter played its first competitive match on 10 January 1909 against their cross-town rivals Milan, in which they lost 3–2. The club won its very first title in 1910 – the 1909–10 Italian Football Championship. Since then, the club has won a further twenty league titles, along with ten Italian Cups and eight Italian Supercups. They have also been crowned champions of Europe on three occasions by winning two European Cups back-to-back in 1964 and 1965 and then another in 2010. The club experienced the most successful period in their history from, 2006 to 2011, where the club won five successive league titles, equalling the all-time record, by adding three Italian Cups, four Italian Supercups, one UEFA Champions League and one FIFA Club World Cup. During the 2009–10, Inter become the first Italian team to win the Treble and only the second team to win five trophies in a calendar year, in 2010.

Since playing their first competitive match, more than 900 players have appeared in competitive first-team matches for the club, some of whom have played between 25 and 99 matches (including substitute appearances). Ronaldo, who than was signed by Inter for a then world record fee of $27 million, fell one short of 100 appearances for the club, due to various injuries during his Inter career.

As of 2026, more than 280 players have played between 25 and 99 competitive matches for the club.

== List of players ==
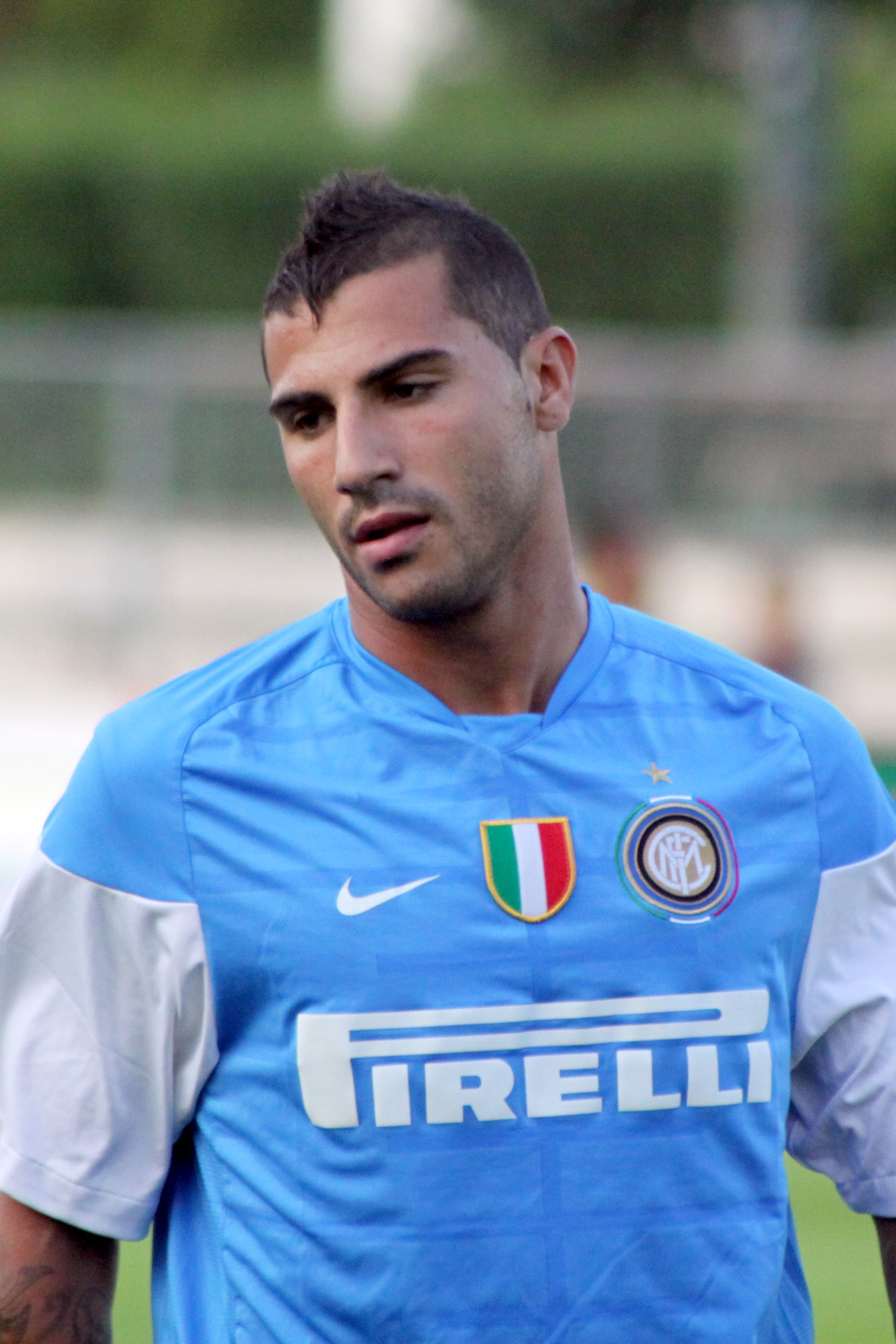
Ricardo Quaresma made 32 appearances in 2 1/2 seasons.

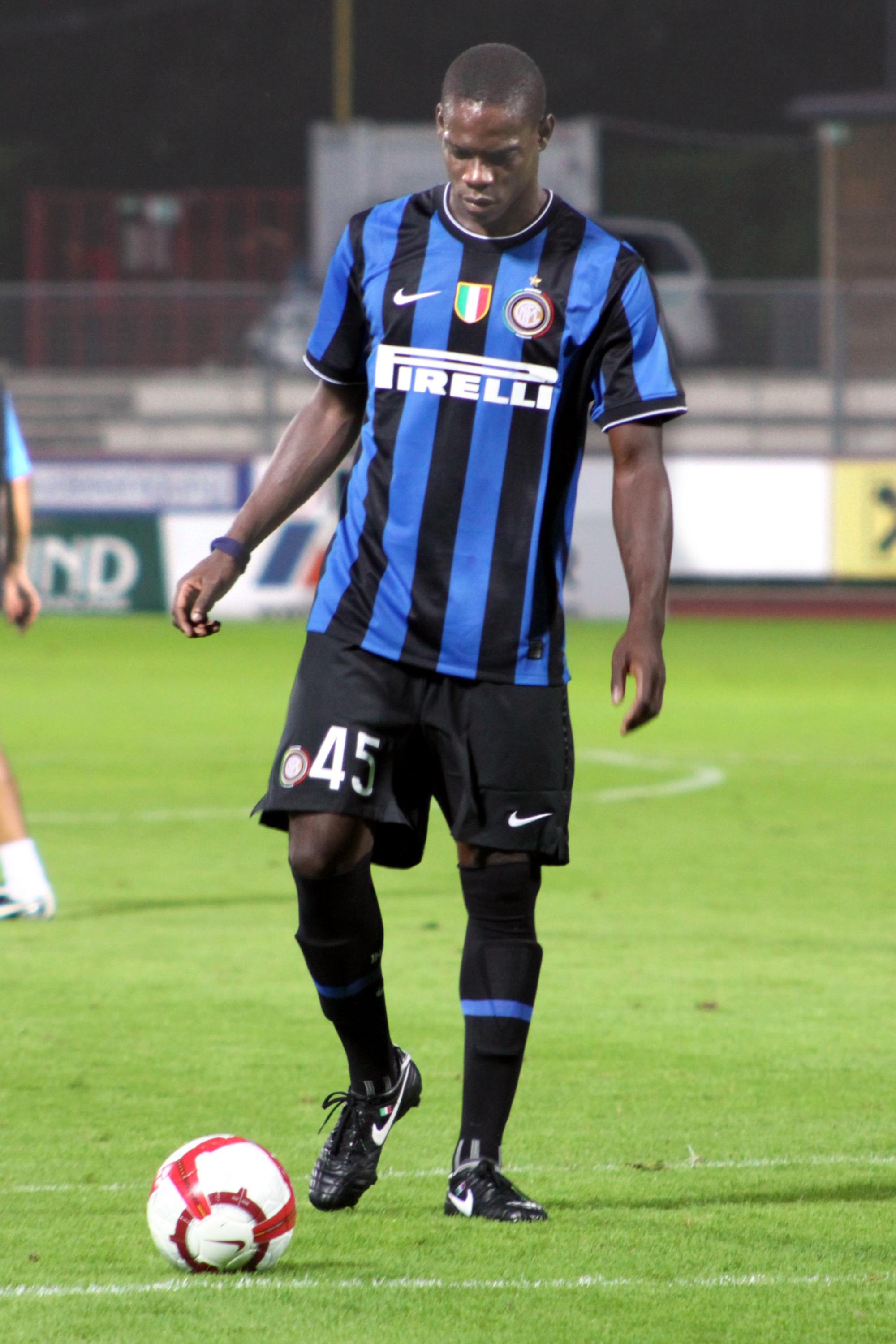
Mario Balotelli played 86 matches and scored 28 goals.

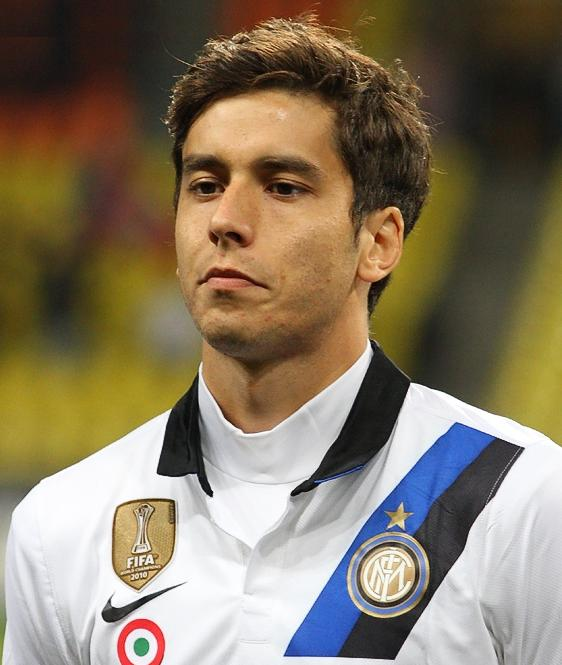
Ricky Álvarez played for three seasons with Inter Milan.

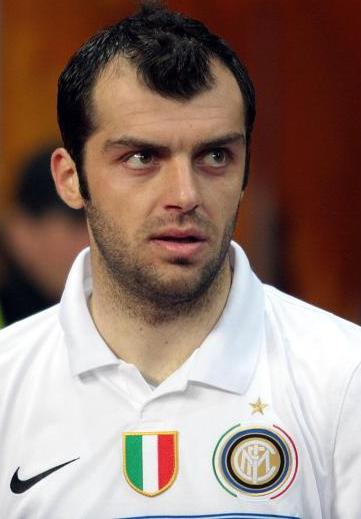
Goran Pandev was one of the main protagonists during the Triplete season.

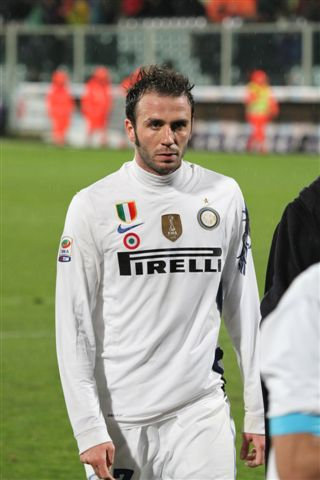
Giampaolo Pazzini made 60 appearances and scored 19 goals for Inter Milan.

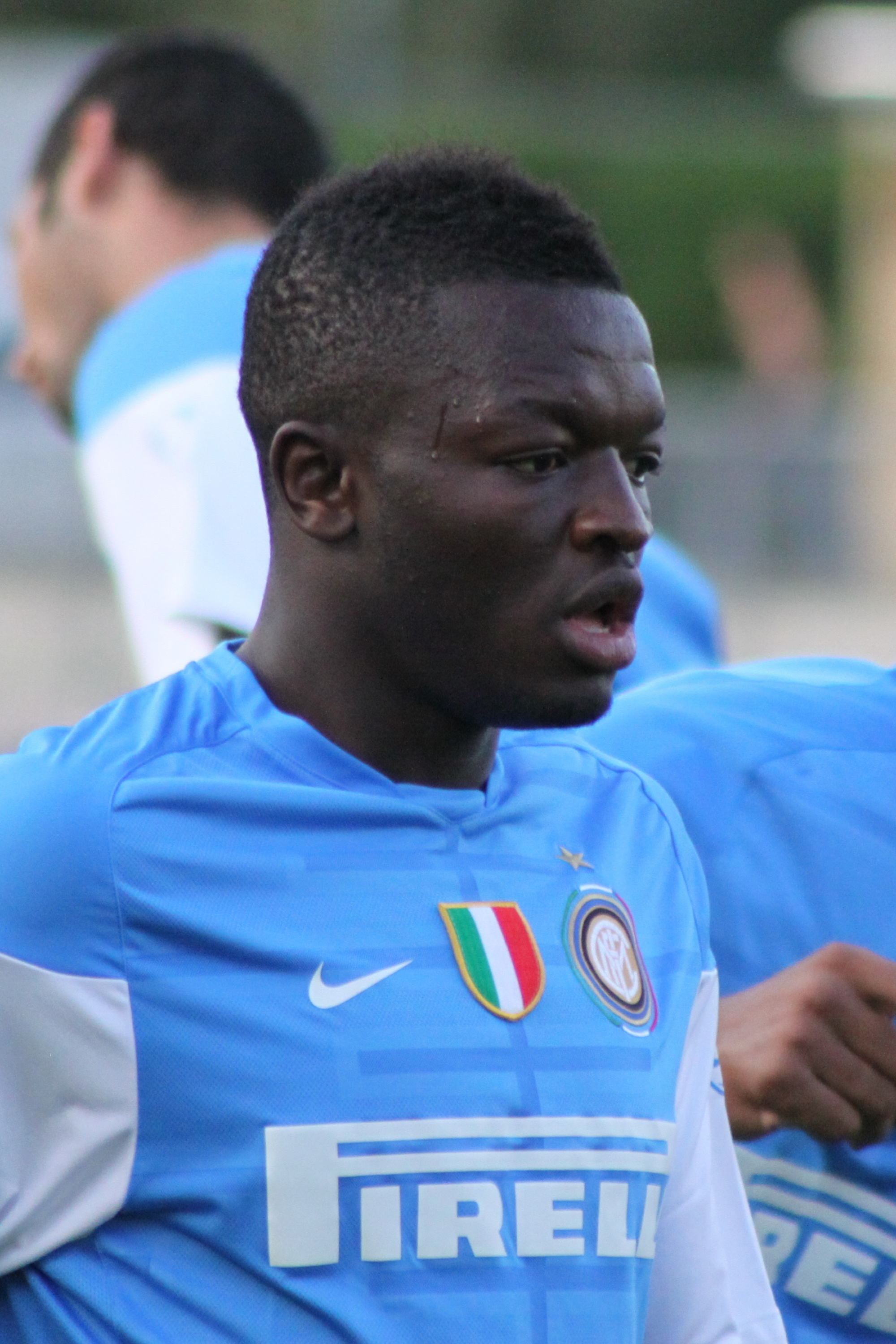
Sulley Muntari played 97 matches and scored 7 goals.

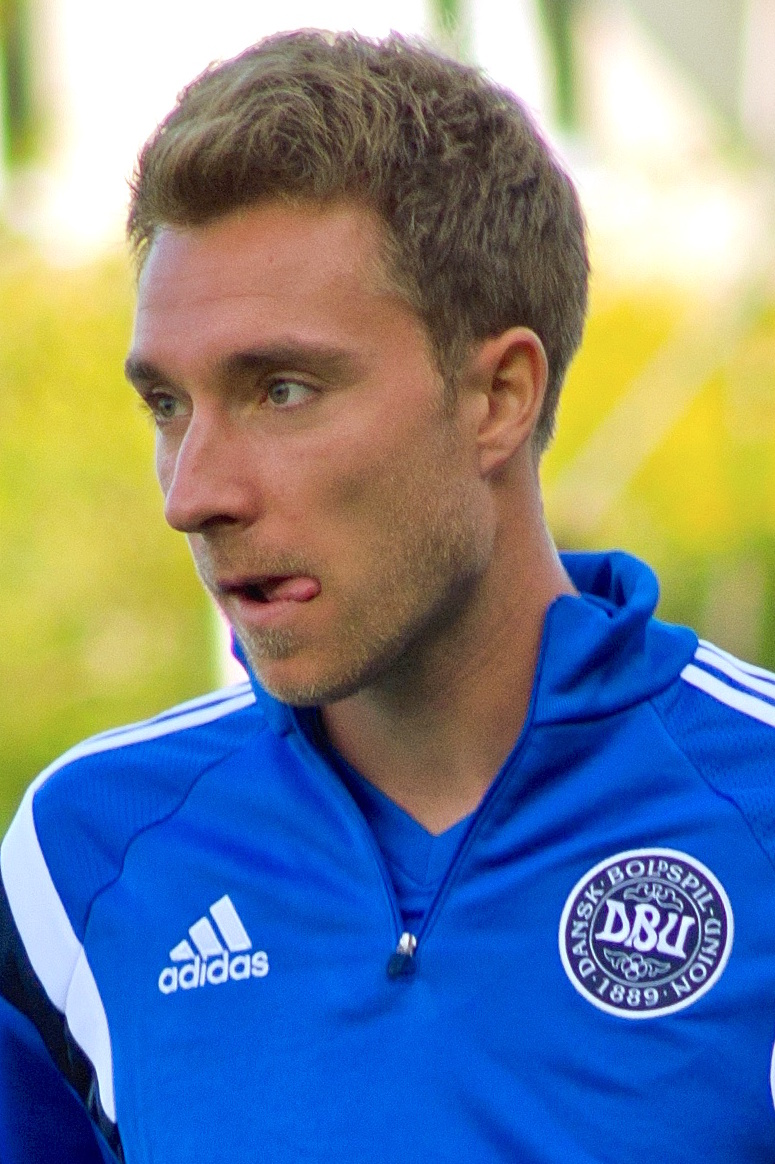
Christian Eriksen made 60 appearances and scored 8 goals in two seasons.

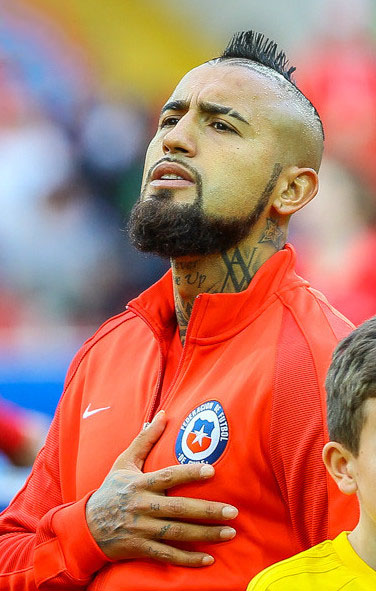
Arturo Vidal played 71 matches and scored 4 goals.

- Appearances and goals are for first-team competitive matches only, including Serie A, Coppa Italia, Supercoppa Italiana, UEFA Europa League/UEFA Cup, European Cup/Champions League, Cup Winners' Cup, Inter-Cities Fairs Cup, Super Cup and Club World Cup matches.
- Players are listed in alphabetical order.

Statistics correct as of 8 November 2026.

Table headers

- Nationality – If a player played international football, the country or countries he played for are shown. Otherwise, the player's nationality is given as his country of birth.
- Inter career – The year of the player's first appearance for Inter Milan to the year of his last appearance.
- Appearances – The total number of games played, both as a starter and as a substitute.

Positions key
Pre-1960s		Post-1960s	
GK	Goalkeeper		
FB	Full back	DF	Defender
HB	Half back	MF	Midfielder
FW	Forward		
U	Utility player^{1}		

List of Inter Milan players with between 25 and 99 appearances
Player	Nationality	Position	Inter career	Appearances	Goals	Ref(s)
Daniele Adani	Italy	DF	2002–2004	45	5	
Paolo Agosteo	Italy	FB	1933–1935	67	7	
Manuel Akanji	Switzerland	DF	2025–present	58	2	
Osvaldo Aliatis	Italy	HB	1921–1925	42	7	
Matías Almeyda	Argentina	MF	2002–2004	47	1	
Ricky Álvarez	Argentina	MF	2011–2015	90	14	
Amadeo Amadei	Italy	FW	1948–1950	70	42	
Claudio Ambu	Italy	FW	1977; 1979–1981	42	4	
Pietro Anastasi	Italy	FW	1976–1978	66	13	
Marco Andreolli	Italy	MF	2005–2007; 2013–2015; 2016–2017	39	3	
Jocelyn Angloma	France	DF	1996–1997	46	3	
Cristian Ansaldi	Argentina	DF	2016–2017	26	0	
Piero Antona	Italy	FW	1935–1939	55	2	
Giuseppe Arezzi	Italy	HB	1947–1948	26	1	
Marko Arnautović	Austria	FW	2009–2010; 2023–2025	65	14	
Kwadwo Asamoah	Ghana	U	2018–2020	53	0	
Kristjan Asllani	Albania	MF	2022–2025	99	4	
Giuseppe Asti	Italy	HB	1914–1920; 1922–1923	48	17	
Klaus Bachlechner	Italy	DF	1981–1982	31	0	
Dino Baggio	Italy		1991–1992	34	2	
Roberto Baggio	Italy	FW	1998–2000	59	17	
Keita Baldé	Senegal	FW	2018–2019	29	5	
Costanzo Balleri	Italy	MF	1960–1962	58	1	
Mario Balotelli	Italy	FW	2007–2010	86	28	
Éver Banega	Argentina	MF	2016–2017	33	6	
Giorgio Barsanti	Italy	FW	1938–1941; 1945–1946	59	15	
Oscar Basso	Argentina	ITA	1949–1950	26	0	
Celso Battaia	Italy	FB	1938–1943	36	0	
Julio Bavastro	Paraguay	FW	1913–1915	41	10	
Enzo Bearzot	Italy	HB	1948–1951; 1956–1957	47	0	
Delfo Bellini	Italy	FW	1925–1927	48	1	
Alessandro Beltrame	Italy	FB	1919–1926	54	0	
Roberto Bergamaschi	Italy	MF	1982–1983	39	2	
Dennis Bergkamp	Netherlands	MF	1993–1995	72	22	
Giorgio Bernardin	Italy	FB	1954–1955; 1956-1958	86	2	
Fulvio Bernardini	Italy	FW	1926–1928	58	27	
Daniele Bernazzani	Italy	DF	1982–1984; 1985-1986	30	0	
Lorenzo Bettini	Italy	FW	1961–1962	26	10	
Giovanni Bia	Italy	DF	1994–1995	31	0	
Jonathan Biabiany	France	FW	2006–2007; 2010–2011; 2015–2017	50	2	
Cristiano Biraghi	Italy	DF	2010–2011; 2019–2020	39	3	
Antonio Bisigato	Italy	FW	1936–1938	27	4	
Laurent Blanc	France	DF	1999–2001	74	6	
Ivano Blason	Italy	FB	1950–1954	85	5	
Antonio Blasevich	Italy	HB	1928–1931	96	41	
Giovanni Bolzoni	Italy	DF	1928–1932	75	0	
Antoine Bonifaci	France	HB	1954–1955	25	0	
Ange-Yoan Bonny	Ivory Coast	FW	2025–present	62	10	
Franco Bontadini	Italy	HB	1911–1920	47	28	
Dino Bovoli	Italy	FB	1941–1943	51	0	
Liam Brady	Ireland	MF	1984–1986	97	16	
Marco Branca	Italy	FW	1995–1998	70	25	
Sergio Brighenti	Italy	FW	1952–1955	40	20	
Pietro Broccini	Italy	HB	1951–1954	33	14	
Lorenzo Buffon	Italy	GK	1960–1963	89	0	
Ottavio Bugatti	Italy	GK	1961–1965	33	0	
Okan Buruk	Turkey	MF	2001–2004	42	2	
Mario Busich	Italy	FW	1923–1925	35	8	
Angelo Caimo	Italy	GK	1939–1943	63	0	
Fabio Calcaterra	Italy	DF	1986–1988	42	0	
Hugo Campagnaro	Argentina	DF	2013–2015	39	0	
João Cancelo	Portugal	DF	2017–2018	28	1	
Fabio Cannavaro	Italy	DF	2002–2004	74	3	
Renato Cappellini	Italy	FW	1963–1968	65	22	
Giovanni Capra	Italy	HB	1909–1911	25	12	
Benito Carbone	Italy	MF	1995–1996	43	4	
Amos Cardarelli	Italy	FB	1958–1960	58	0	
Roberto Carlos	Brazil	DF	1995–1996	34	7	
Juan Pablo Carrizo	Argentina	GK	2013–2017	27	0	
Francesco Casartelli	Italy	FB	1923–1926	58	0	
Domenico Caso	Italy	MF	1979–1981	76	4	
Antonio Cassano	Italy	FW	2012–2013	39	10	
Luca Castellazzi	Italy	GK	2010–2014	36	0	
Franco Causio	Italy	MF	1984–1985	42	3	
Giancarlo Cella	Italy	DF	1968–1971	59	1	
Giancarlo Centi	Italy	MF	1981–1982	34	1	
Franco Cerilli	Italy	MF	1974–1976	28	1	
César	Brazil	U	2006–2008	36	3	
Aldo Cevenini	Italy	HB	1912–1915; 1919-1923	91	46	
Mario Cevenini	Italy	FB	1914–1915; 1919-1921	39	1	
Odoacre Chierico	Italy	MF	1977–1979	27	1	
Massimo Ciocci	Italy	FW	1985–1989; 1991–1992	87	10	
Bruno Cirillo	Italy	DF	2000–2001	26	0	
Francesco Coco	Italy	DF	2002–2005; 2006–2007	41	0	
Francesco Colonnese	Italy	DF	1997–2000	80	2	
Cesare Compagnoli	Italy	FW	1955–1957	25	5	
Sergio Conceiçao	Portugal	MF	2001–2003	65	2	
Mirko Conte	Italy	DF	1994–1995	28	0	
Joaquín Correa	Argentina	FW	2021–2023; 2024–2025	99	12	
Philippe Coutinho	Brazil	MF	2010–2013	47	5	
Enrico Cucchi	Italy	MF	1984–1987; 1989-1990	91	2	
Antonio Da Sacco	Italy	FB	1920–1922	36	0	
Olivier Dacourt	France	MF	2006–2009	51	0	
Dalbert	Brazil	DF	2017–2019; 2022–2023	26	1	
Stéphane Dalmat	France	MF	2000–2003	66	4	
Luigi De Agostini	Italy	DF	1992–1993	36	1	
Alfredo De Vincenzi	Argentina	FW	1934–1936	56	21	
Francesco Dell'Anno	Italy	MF	1993–1996	53	1	
Marco Delvecchio	Italy	FW	1991–1992; 1994-1996	44	5	
Stefano Desideri	Italy	MF	1991–1993	40	6	
Beniamino Di Giacomo	Italy	MF	1962–1964	37	13	
Ramón Díaz	Argentina	FW	1988–1989	43	15	
Andy Diouf	France	MF	2025–present	42	4	
Dodô	Brazil	DF	2014–2016	29	2	
Giuseppe Doldi	Italy	FW	1972–1974	26	0	
Aldo Dorigo	Italy	HB	1956–1958	54	5	
Éder	Italy	FW	2016–2018	86	14	
Christian Eriksen	Denmark	MF	2020–2021	60	8	
Pio Esposito	Italy	FW	2025–present	63	15	
Bernardino Fabbian	Italy	MF	1970–1973	29	0	
Edmondo Fabbri	Italy	FW	1942–1943; 1945-1946	47	12	
Ricardo Faccio	Uruguay	HB	1933–1936	92	0	
Javier Farinós	Spain	MF	2000–2002; 2003–2004	76	3	
Giuseppe Favalli	Italy	DF	2004–2006	68	0	
Matteo Ferrari	Italy	DF	2000–2001	27	0	
Rino Ferrario	Italy	FB	1955–1956	30	1	
Luigi Ferrero	Italy	FW	1930–1932	41	12	
Gianluca Festa	Italy	DF	1993–1997	88	4	
Gustavo Fiorini	Italy	HB	1947–1950	33	5	
Giuseppe Fossati	Italy	FB	1913–1914; 1919–1923	43	3	
Virgilio Fossati	Italy	FB	1909–1915	97	4	
Gustavo Francesconi	Italy	FB	1919–1920; 1923–1925	62	0	
Sébastien Frey	France	GK	1998–1999; 2000–2001	47	0	
Francesco Frione	Uruguay	FW	1932–1935	62	13	
Roberto Fronte	Italy	FB	1909–1912	25	0	
Mario Frustalupi	Italy	MF	1970–1972	54	3	
Fabio Galante	Italy	DF	1996–1999	88	3	
Roberto Galbiati	Italy	DF	1974–1976	28	0	
Achille Gama	Brazil	FW	1908–1909; 1910–1914	46	19	
Carlos Gamarra	Paraguay	DF	2002–2005	44	0	
Maurizio Ganz	Italy	FW	1995–1997	98	39	
Walter Gargano	Uruguay	MF	2012–2013	36	0	
Luciano Gariboldi	Italy	FB	1946–1949	33	0	
Oliviero Garlini	Italy	FW	1986–1987	29	4	
Angiolino Gasparini	Italy	DF	1975–1978	95	0	
Mauro Gatti	Italy	DF	1959–1961	49	2	
Grigoris Georgatos	Greece	DF	1999–2000; 2001–2002	46	4	
Ferruccio Ghidini	Italy	FB	1934–1937	57	1	
Sergio Girardi	Italy	GK	1968–1970	27	0	
Camillo Girotti	Italy	FB	1938–1939; 1940–1943; 1945–1946	48	0	
Giuseppe Giustacchini	Italy	HB	1923–1924; 1925–1928	67	5	
Diego Godín	Uruguay	DF	2019–2020	36	2	
Kily González	Argentina	FW	2003–2006	75	0	
Sergio Gori	Italy	FW	1964–1966; 1968–1969	29	6	
Robin Gosens	Germany	DF	2022–2023	58	5	
Vratislav Greško	Slovakia	DF	2000–2002	54	1	
Fabio Grosso	Italy	DF	2006–2007	35	3	
Raffaele Guaita	Italy	HB	1945–1950	60	0	
Umberto Guarnieri	Italy	FW	1938–1942	60	29	
Andrés Guglielminpietro	Argentina	MF	2001–2003	48	1	
Viviano Guida	Italy	DF	1974–1975; 1976–1977	26	0	
Achraf Hakimi	Morocco	DF	2020–2021	45	7	
Thomas Helveg	Denmark	DF	2003–2004	32	1	
Luis Henrique	Brazil	MF	2025–present	52	1	
Hernanes	Brazil	MF	2014–2015	52	7	
Gerry Hitchens	England	FW	1961–1963	43	20	
Paul Ince	England	MF	1995–1997	73	13	
Luis Jiménez	Chile	MF	2007–2009	30	4	
Jonathan	Brazil	DF	2011–2015	66	6	
Wim Jonk	Netherlands	MF	1993–1995	67	13	
Stevan Jovetić	Montenegro	FW	2015–2017	33	7	
Juary	Brazil	FW	1982–1983	36	4	
Vladimir Jugović	Yugoslavia	MF	1999–2001	49	3	
Mohamed Kallon	Sierra Leone	FW	2001–2004	65	20	
Giorgos Karagounis	Greece	MF	2003–2005	36	0	
Geoffrey Kondogbia	France	MF	2015–2017	56	2	
Mateo Kovačić	Croatia	MF	2013–2015	98	8	
Zdravko Kuzmanović	Serbia	MF	2013–2015	55	1	
Sabri Lamouchi	France	MF	2003–2004	26	0	
Virgilio Levratto	Italy	FW	1932–1934	67	27	
Giacomo Libera	Italy	FW	1975–1977	46	13	
Adem Ljajić	Serbia	FW	2015–2016	29	4	
Sergio Magistrelli	Italy	FW	1972–1974	27	3	
Saul Malatrasi	Italy	DF	1964–1966	33	0	
Mancini	Brazil	MF	2008–2010	36	2	
Antonio Manicone	Italy	MF	1992–1996	79	2	
Luciano Marangon	Italy	DF	1985–1987	36	2	
Sergio Marchi	Italy	FB	1945–1948	78	0	
Giorgio Mariani	Italy	FW	1973–1975	57	11	
Mcdonald Mariga	Kenya	MF	2010–2014	36	2	
João Mário	Portugal	MF	2016–2018; 2018–2019	69	4	
Piero Martinella	Italy	HB	1920–1922	32	2	
Josep Martínez	Spain	GK	2024–present	34	0	
Ernesto Mascheroni	Uruguay; Italy	FB	1934–1936	63	4	
Giuseppe Massa	Italy	MF	1972–1974	64	9	
Oscar Massei	Argentina	FW	1955–1958	54	21	
Enzo Matteucci	Italy	HB	1956–1960	96	0	
Bruno Mazza	Italy	HB	1952–1955	83	7	
Felipe Melo	Brazil	MF	2015–2017	38	1	
Mario Mereghetti	Italy	MF	1956–1957; 1958–1960; 1961–1962; 1966–1967	35	2	
Claudio Merlo	Italy	MF	1976–1978	56	0	
Renato Miglioli	Italy	FB	1949–1952	84	8	
Siniša Mihajlović	Serbia and Montenegro	MF	2004–2006	42	7	
Aurelio Milani	Italy	FW	1963–1965	37	9	
Alessandro Milesi	Italy	FB	1919–1923	50	0	
Giuseppe Minaudo	Italy	MF	1985–1988	40	3	
Egidio Morbello	Italy	FW	1960–1963	51	16	
Dario Morello	Italy	MF	1987–1990	44	5	
Mario Moretti	Italy	FB	1908–1915	49	1	
Domenico Morfeo	Italy	MF	2002–2003	27	2	
Francesco Moriero	Italy	MF	1997–2000	83	10	
Adelio Moro	Italy	MF	1972–1975	90	13	
Thiago Motta	Brazil; Italy	MF	2009–2011	83	12	
Roberto Mozzini	Italy	DF	1979–1981	59	1	
Cosimo Muci	Italy	FW	1945–1948	86	29	
Hansi Müller	Germany	MF	1982–1984	68	13	
Sulley Muntari	Ghana	MF	2008–2012	97	7	
Jeison Murillo	Colombia	DF	2015–2017	69	3	
Radja Nainggolan	Belgium	MF	2018–2019; 2020–2021	41	7	
Giacomo Neri	Italy	FW	1946–1948	39	10	
Aldo Nicoli	Italy	FW	1972–1975	41	1	
Salvatore Nobile	Italy	DF	1987–1988	38	0	
Joel Obi	Nigeria	MF	2010–2015	71	3	
André Onana	Cameroon	GK	2022–2023	41	0	
Pierluigi Orlandini	Italy	MF	1994–1996	39	6	
Bruno Padulazzi	Italy	FB	1950–1955	95	1	
Franco Pancheri	Italy	DF	1979–1981	43	1	
Darko Pančev	Yugoslavia; North Macedonia	FW	1992–1994; 1994–1995	29	10	
Goran Pandev	North Macedonia	FW	2010–2011	69	8	
Egisto Pandolfini	Italy	HB	1956–1958	39	8	
Tristano Pangaro	Italy	FB	1947–1949	38	0	
Christian Panucci	Italy	DF	1999–2000	31	1	
Giovanni Pasquale	Italy	DF	2003–2005	57	0	
Daniel Passarella	Argentina	DF	1986–1988	73	15	
Benjamin Pavard	France	DF	2023–2025; 2026–present	76	1	
Giuseppe Pavone	Italy	MF	1975–1978	84	10	
Carlo Payer	Italy	HB	1909–1912	50	8	
Giampaolo Pazzini	Italy	FW	2011–2012	60	19	
Joaquín Peiró	Spain	FW	1964–1966	47	16	
Sergio Pellizzaro	Italy	FW	1970; 1971–1972	36	3	
Romano Penzo	Italy	FW	1945–1946	27	18	
Antonio Perduca	Italy	FB	1931–1932	27	0	
Álvaro Pereira	Uruguay	DF	2012–2014	47	1	
Angelo Peruzzi	Italy	GK	1999–2000	38	0	
Ernest Peterly	Switzerland	HB	1909–1914	55	30	
Franco Pian	Italy	FB	1947–1950	52	0	
Adriano Piraccini	Italy	MF	1986–1988	80	3	
Andrea Pirlo	Italy	MF	1998–1999; 2000–2001	40	0	
Alessandro Pistone	Italy	FB	1995–1997	60	1	
Alfredo Pitto	Italy	HB	1933–1936	78	3	
David Pizarro	Chile	MF	2005–2006	40	3	
Fausto Pizzi	Italy	MF	1985–1986; 1990–1992	55	6	
Bernardo Poli	Italy	FB	1939–1942	47	2	
Matteo Politano	Italy	FW	2018–2020	63	6	
Roberto Porta	Uruguay	FW	1934–1936	57	13	
Antonio Powolny	Austria	FW	1926–1927	27	22	
Herbert Prohaska	Austria	MF	1980–1982	81	11	
Bruno Quaresima	Italy	FW	1947–1948	25	16	
Ricardo Quaresma	Portugal	MF	2008–2010	32	1	
Nelson Rivas	Colombia	DF	2007–2011	28	0	
Rolando	Portugal	DF	2013–2014	29	4	
Ronaldo	Brazil	FW	1997–2002	99	59	
Giorgio Roselli	Italy	MF	1975–1978	33	0	
Orlando Sain	Italy	GK	1938–1939; 1940–1941	28	0	
Valentino Sala	Italy	HB	1935–1937	49	1	
Luigi Sartor	Italy	DF	1997–1998	38	1	
Marco Savioni	Italy	FW	1951–1952; 1954–1955; 1956–1958	32	10	
Nevio Scala	Italy	MF	1973–1975	55	2	
Alessandro Scanziani	Italy	MF	1977–1979	62	9	
Paolo Scheidler	Italy	HB	1911–1915; 1919–1923	92	16	
Salvatore Schillaci	Italy	FW	1992–1994	36	12	
Vincenzo Scifo	Belgium	MF	1987–1988	44	5	
Duilio Setti	Italy	FB	1937–1941	85	0	
Clarence Seedorf	Netherlands	MF	1999–2002	93	14	
Andrea Seno	Italy	MF	1994–1997	36	3	
Stefano Sensi	Italy	MF	2019–2022; 2023–2024	57	4	
Michele Serena	Italy	DF	1999–2002	35	0	
Ciriaco Sforza	Switzerland	MF	1996–1997	40	4	
Igor Shalimov	Russia	MF	1992–1994	67	14	
Mikaël Silvestre	France	DF	1998–1999	31	1	
Diego Simeone	Argentina	MF	1997–1999	85	14	
Dario Šimić	Croatia	DF	1999–2002	97	4	
Bonifacio Smerzi	Italy	GK	1928–1932	41	0	
Santiago Solari	Argentina	MF	2005–2008	71	7	
Narciso Soldan	Italy	GK	1949–1951	42	0	
Paulo Sousa	Portugal	MF	1998–2000	40	0	
Paolo Stringara	Italy	MF	1990–1991	29	1	
David Suazo	Honduras	FW	2007–2011	40	8	
Petar Sučić	Croatia	MF	2025–present	67	5	
Hakan Şükür	Turkey	FW	2000–2001	34	6	
Vasco Tagliavini	Italy	FB	1956–1960	44	0	
Carlo Tagnin	Italy	DF	1962–1965	56	1	
Saphir Taïder	Algeria	DF	2013–2015	26	2	
Marco Tardelli	Italy	MF	1985–1987	71	8	
Mehdi Taremi	Iran	FW	2024–2025	43	3	
Guglielmo Tornabuoni	Italy	HB	1924–1926	29	7	
Paolo Tramezzani	Italy	DF	1992–1994	34	0	
Egidio Turchi	Italy	HB	1932–1933; 1936-1937	27	2	
Andy van der Meyde	Netherlands	FW	2003–2005	54	4	
Eligio Vecchi	Italy	FW	1934–1937	32	4	
Nicola Ventola	Italy	FW	1998–1999; 2001–2003; 2004	64	21	
Arcadio Venturi	Italy	HB	1957–1960	67	0	
Corrado Verdelli	Italy	DF	1986–1990	57	0	
Juan Sebastián Verón	Argentina	MF	2004–2006	74	4	
Arturo Vidal	Chile	MF	2020–2022	71	4	
Nemanja Vidić	Serbia	DF	2014–2016	28	1	
Patrick Vieira	France	MF	2006–2010	90	9	
Oreste Viganò	Italy	FB	1910–1922	43	0	
Carlo Villa	Italy	HB	1936–1937	27	2	
Gino Visentin	Italy	FB	1927–1928	25	0	
Roger Vonlanthen	Switzerland	FW	1955–1957	46	12	
Taribo West	Nigeria	MF	1997–1999	65	2	
Faas Wilkes	Netherlands	HB	1949–1952	95	47	
Pierre Wome	Cameroon	DF	2005–2006	26	0	
Ashley Young	England	U	2020–2021	59	5	
Franco Zaglio	Italy	MF	1960–1964	54	4	
Italo Zamberletti	Italy	GK	1921–1923; 1924–1927	49	0	
Bibiano Zapirain	Uruguay	FW	1946–1948	58	18	
Mauro Zárate	Argentina	FW	2011–2012	31	3	
Zé Elias	Brazil	MF	1997–1999	53	4	
Zé Maria	Brazil	MF	2004–2006	49	1	
Alfredo Zoller	Switzerland	FB	1909–1911	28	0	

== See also ==
- Serie A winning players
- Inter Milan and the Italy national football team
- Inter Milan Hall of Fame

== Notes ==
- A utility player is one who is considered to play in multiple positions.
