= 1949–50 Inter Milan season =

Football Club Internazionale
1949-50 season
- President: Carlo Masseroni
- Manager: Mariano Tansini; Giulio Cappelli (as Technical Director)
- Stadium: Stadio San Siro
- Serie A: 3rd.
- Top goalscorer: Nyers I (30)
Home colours

During the 1949–50 season, Football Club Internazionale competed in Serie A.

== Summary ==
The campaign is best remembered by the hat-trick of Amedeo Amadei in the Milan derby after Inter started losing 1-4 and won the match with the all-time highest score (6-5) on 6 November 1949.

In the summer of 1949, Masseroni transferred in the club several players such as Giovanni Giacomazzi, youngster back from Luparense, Renato Miglioli from Atalanta and Dutchman winger Faas Wilkes. The club finished 3rd position in league behind Milan and champions Juventus.

== Squad ==
Note: Flags indicate national team as defined under FIFA eligibility rules; some limited exceptions apply. Players may hold more than one non-FIFA nationality.

| Pos. | Nation | Player |
|---|---|---|
| GK | ITA | Narciso Soldan |
| GK | ITA | Angelo Franzosi |
| DF | ITA | Giovanni Giacomazzi |
| DF | ITA | Franco Pian |
| DF | ITA | Attilio Giovannini |
| MF | ITA | Aldo Campatelli |
| MF | NED | Faas Wilkes |
| MF | ITA | Osvaldo Fattori |
| MF | ITA | Camillo Achilli |

| Pos. | Nation | Player |
|---|---|---|
| MF | ITA | Renato Miglioli |
| MF | ITA | Enzo Bearzot |
| MF | ARG | Oscar Basso |
| MF | ITA | Gustavo Fiorini |
| MF | ITA | Raffaele Guaita |
| FW | ITA | Benito Lorenzi |
| FW | ITA | Gino Armano |
| FW | HUN | István Nyers |
| FW | ITA | Amedeo Amadei |
| MF | ITA | Giovanni Invernizzi |

== Competitions ==
=== Serie A ===
==== League table ====
| Pos | Team | Pld | W | D | L | GF | GA | GD | Pts | Qualification or relegation |
|---|---|---|---|---|---|---|---|---|---|---|
| 1 | Juventus (C) | 38 | 28 | 6 | 4 | 100 | 43 | +57 | 62 | |
| 2 | Milan | 38 | 27 | 3 | 8 | 118 | 45 | +73 | 57 | |
| 3 | Internazionale | 38 | 21 | 7 | 10 | 99 | 60 | +39 | 49 | |
| 4 | Lazio | 38 | 18 | 10 | 10 | 67 | 43 | +24 | 46 | Qualified for the 1950 Latin Cup |
| 5 | Fiorentina | 38 | 18 | 8 | 12 | 76 | 57 | +19 | 44 | |

Source: Panini
(C) Champions

==== Matches ====
| 11 September 1949 1 | Inter Milan | 1–1 | Padova | Milan |
| | Fattori 11' | Report | 70' Prunecchi | Stadium: Stadio San Siro; Referee: Agostino Gamba |

| 18 September 1949 2 | Pro Patria | 0–3 | Inter Milan | Busto Arsizio |
| | | Report | 32' (rig), 61' Nyers I 89' Wilkes | Stadium: Stadio Comunale; Referee: Ferruccio Bellè |

| 25 September 1949 3 | Inter Milan | 3–1 | Atalanta | Milan |
| | Miglioli 3'; Amadei 35'; Wilkes | Report | 2' Randon | Stadium: Stadio San Siro; Referee: Gemini |

| 2 October 1949 4 | Triestina | 4–2 | Inter Milan | Trieste |
| | Petagna 11'; Trevisan 23'; Ispiro 38'; Blason 72' | Report | 35' (pen.), 88' (pen.) Nyers I | Stadium: Stadio Comunale; Referee: Galeati |

| 9 October 1949 5 | Inter Milan | 7–0 | Venezia | Milan |
| | Wilkes 3', 23'; Amadei 17', 74'; Campatelli 22'; Miglioli 67'; Lorenzi 84' | Report | | Stadium: Stadio San Siro; Referee: Vannini |

| 16 October 1949 6 | Fiorentina | 4–2 | Inter Milan | Florence |
| | Galassi 16'; Pandolfini 19'; Nagy 49', 50' | Report | 5' Nyers I 82' Amadei | Stadium: Stadio Comunale; Referee: Bellè |

| 20 October 1949 7 | Roma | 1–3 | Inter Milan | Rome |
| | Arangelovic 39' | Report | 27' Lorenzi; 73' Armano; 89' Wilkes | Stadium: Stadio Nazionale; Referee: Giorgio Bernardi |

| 23 October 1949 8 | Inter Milan | 2–0 | Sampdoria | Milan |
| | Bertani 12' (o.g.); Lorenzi 90' | Report | | Stadium: Stadio San Siro; Referee: Tassini |

| 30 October 1949 9 | Novara | 0–0 | Inter Milan | Novara |
| | | Report | | Stadium: Stadio Comunale; Referee: Galeati |

| 6 November 1949 10 | Inter Milan | 6–5 | AC Milan | Milan |
| | Nyers I 10', 40' (pen.); Amadei 39', 50', 64'; Lorenzi 58' | Report | 1', 7' Candiani; 14' Nordahl; 19' Liedholm; 59' Annovazzi | Stadium: Stadio San Siro; Referee: Vincenzo Orlandini |

| 13 November 1949 11 | Juventus | 3–2 | Inter Milan | Turin |
| | Hansen 30' (rig) 59'; Piccinini 75' | Report | 14' Wilkes; 18' Lorenzi | Stadium: Stadio Comunale; Referee: Pieri |

| 20 November 1949 12 | Palermo | 4–2 | Inter Milan | Palermo |
| | De Santis 24', 26'; Gimona 54'; Miglioli 62' (o.g.) | Report | 64' Nyers I 70' Lorenzi | Stadium: Stadio La Favorita; Referee: Vittorio Pera |

| 4 December 1949 13 | Inter Milan | 2–1 | Lazio | Milan |
| | Nyers I 36' (pen.); Amadei 57' | Report | 64' Nyers II | Stadium: Stadio San Siro; Referee: Tassini |

| 8 December 1949 14 | Lucchese | 0–5 | Inter Milan | Lucca |
| | | Report | 50', 81' Amadei; 64' Nyers I 82' Lorenzi; 90' Wilkes | Stadium: Stadio Porta Elisa; Referee: Generoso Dattilo |

| 11 December 1949 15 | Inter Milan | 2–0 | Torino | Milan |
| | Lorenzi 52'; Amadei 76' | Report | | Stadium: Stadio San Siro; Referee: Vincenzo Orlandini |

| 18 December 1949 16 | Genoa | 1–1 | Inter Milan | Genoa |
| | Boyé 16' | Report | 4' Nyers I | Stadium: Stadio Luigi Ferraris; Referee: Galeati |

| 25 December 1949 17 | Como | 1–5 | Inter Milan | Como |
| | Susmel 23' (pen.) | Report | 14', 79', 87' Nyers I 20' Lorenzi; 25' Wilkes | Stadium: Stadio Giuseppe Sinigaglia; Referee: Luigi Gemini |

| 1 January 1950 18 | Inter Milan | 2–1 | Bologna | Milan |
| | Amadei 8'; Nyers I 52' | Report | 40' Mike | Stadium: Stadio San Siro; Referee: Giacomo Bertolio |

| 8 January 1950 19 | Inter Milan | 4–0 | Bari | Milan |
| | Nyers I 38' (pen.), 53', 69' (pen.), 87' | Report | | Stadium: Stadio San Siro; Referee: Florindo Longagnani |

| 15 January 1950 20 | Padova | 2–2 | Inter Milan | Padua |
| | Curti 44', 64' | Report | 16' Amadei; 89' Fattori | Stadium: Stadio Silvio Appiani; Referee: Generoso Dattilo |

| 22 January 1950 21 | Inter Milan | 2–0 | Pro Patria | Milan |
| | Achilli 44'; Amadei 86' | Report | | Stadium: Stadio San Siro; Referee: Corallo |

| 29 January 1950 22 | Atalanta | 2–1 | Inter Milan | Bergamo |
| | Hansen 40' (pen.); Fabbri 48' | Report | 39' Amadei | Stadium: Stadio Comunale; Referee: Ferruccio Bellè |

| 5 February 1950 23 | Inter Milan | 6–1 | Triestina | Milan |
| | Campatelli 3', 79'; Nyers I 26', 83'; Amadei 34'; Wilkes 70' | Report | 64' (o.g.) Miglioli | Stadium: Stadio San Siro; Referee: Giorgio Bernardi |

| 12 February 1950 24 | Venezia | 1–1 | Inter Milan | Venice |
| | Renosto II 48' | Report | 59' Nyers I | Stadium: Stadio Pier Luigi Penzo; Referee: Luigi Gemini |

| 19 February 1950 25 | Inter Milan | 4–2 | Fiorentina | Milan |
| | Amadei 30'; Nyers I 53'; Wilkes 66'; Armano 83' | Report | 67' (pen.) Giusti; 72' Galassi | Stadium: Stadio San Siro; Referee: Gamba |

| 23 February 1950 26 | Inter Milan | 3–1 | Roma | Milan |
| | Armano 11'; Wilkes 40'; Amadei 64' | Report | 80' Venturi | Stadium: Stadio San Siro; Referee: Giuseppe Boffardi |

| 26 February 1950 27 | Sampdoria | 0–2 | Inter Milan | Genoa |
| | | Report | 25' Fattori; 85' Lorenzi | Stadium: Stadio Luigi Ferraris; Referee: Renzo Massai |

| 12 March 1950 28 | Inter Milan | 1–1 | Novara | Milan |
| | Lorenzi 74' | Report | 25' Spadavecchia | Stadium: Stadio San Siro; Referee: Mario Scotto |

| 19 March 1950 29 | AC Milan | 3–1 | Inter Milan | Milan |
| | Basso 8' (o.g.); Gren 41' (pen.); Candiani 89' | Report | 14' Lorenzi | Stadium: Stadio San Siro; Referee: Ferruccio Bellè |

| 26 March 1950 30 | Inter Milan | 2–4 | Juventus | Milan |
| | Bertuccelli 32' (o.g.); Parola 90' (o.g.) | Report | 19' Hansen; 55', 65' Praest; 77' Muccinelli | Stadium: Stadio San Siro; Referee: Giovanni Galeati |

| 9 April 1950 31 | Inter Milan | 1–1 | Palermo | Milan |
| | Nyers I 90' (pen.) | Report | 63' Di Maso | Stadium: Stadio San Siro; Referee: Eriprando Poggipollini |

| 16 April 1950 32 | Lazio | 3–2 | Inter Milan | Rome |
| | Flamini 7'; Magrini 16'; Sentimenti III 50' | Report | 38', 75' (pen.) Nyers I | Stadium: Stadio Nazionale; Referee: Bertolio |

| 23 April 1950 33 | Inter Milan | 6–3 | Lucchese | Milan |
| | Wilkes 8', 76'; Armano 11'; Nyers I 19', 26'; Amadei 36' | Report | 32' Scarpato; 79' Kincses; 88' Onorato | Stadium: Stadio San Siro; Referee: Rigato |

| 30 April 1950 34 | Torino | 1–0 | Inter Milan | Turin |
| | Gremese II 24' | Report | | Stadium: Stadio Filadelfia; Referee: Longagnani |

| 7 May 1950 35 | Inter Milan | 4–2 | Genoa | Milan |
| | Lorenzi 6'; Wilkes 43', 89'; Armano 74' | Report | 32' (o.g.) Basso; 85' (o.g.) Giovannini | Stadium: Stadio San Siro; Referee: Orlandini |

| 14 May 1950 36 | Inter Milan | 1–2 | Como | Milan |
| | Nyers I 81' | Report | 32' Rabitti; 65' Ghiandi | Stadium: Stadio San Siro; Referee: Maurelli |

| 21 May 1950 37 | Bologna | 2–3 | Inter Milan | Bologna |
| | García 63', 79' | Report | 7', 55' Wilkes; 38' Amadei | Stadium: Stadio Comunale; Referee: Dattilo |

| 28 May 1950 38 | Bari | 2–3 | Inter Milan | Bari |
| | Cassani 6'; Fabian 35' | Report | 14', 25' Lorenzi; 66' Nyers I | Stadium: Stadio della Vittoria; Referee: Gamba |

== Statistics ==
=== Squad statistics ===
| Competition | Points | Total | | | | | | GD |
| Competition | Points | G | W | D | L | Gs | Ga | GD |
|---|---|---|---|---|---|---|---|---|
| 1949-50 Serie A | 49 | 38 | 21 | 7 | 10 | 99 | 60 | +39 |
| Home | 31 | 19 | 14 | 3 | 2 | 59 | 26 | +33 |
| Away | 18 | 7 | 4 | 8 | 2 | 40 | 34 | +6 |

=== Player statistics ===
| No. | Pos | Nat | Player | Total | | 1949-50 Serie A | |
| No. | Pos | Nat | Player | Apps | Goals | Apps | Goals |
|---|---|---|---|---|---|---|---|
| | GK | (Italy) ITA | Narciso Soldan | 21 | -28 | 21 | -28 |
| | DF | (Italy) ITA | Attilio Giovannini | 34 | 0 | 34 | 0 |
| | MF | (Italy) ITA | Aldo Campatelli | 26 | 3 | 26 | 3 |
| | MF | (Netherlands) NED | Faas Wilkes | 34 | 17 | 34 | 17 |
| | MF | (Italy) ITA | Osvaldo Fattori | 34 | 3 | 34 | 3 |
| | MF | (Italy) ITA | Camillo Achilli | 29 | 1 | 29 | 1 |
| | MF | (Italy) ITA | Renato Miglioli | 36 | 2 | 36 | 2 |
| | FW | (Italy) ITA | Benito Lorenzi | 31 | 15 | 31 | 15 |
| | FW | (Italy) ITA | Gino Armano | 28 | 5 | 28 | 5 |
| | FW | (Hungary) HUN | István Nyers | 36 | 30 | 36 | 30 |
| | FW | (Italy) ITA | Amedeo Amadei | 32 | 20 | 32 | 20 |
| | GK | (Italy) ITA | Angelo Franzosi | 17 | -32 | 17 | -32 |
| | MF | (Argentina) ARG | Oscar Basso | 26 | 0 | 26 | 0 |
| | MF | (Italy) ITA | Raffaele Guaita | 12 | 0 | 12 | 0 |
| | DF | (Italy) ITA | Giovanni Giacomazzi | 8 | 0 | 8 | 0 |
| | DF | (Italy) ITA | Franco Pian | 1 | 0 | 1 | 0 |
| | MF | (Italy) ITA | Enzo Bearzot | 6 | 0 | 6 | 0 |
| | MF | (Italy) ITA | Gustavo Fiorini | 4 | 0 | 4 | 0 |
| | MF | (Italy) ITA | Giovanni Invernizzi | 3 | 0 | 3 | 0 |

- Source: http://calcio-seriea.net/presenze/1949/302/

== Bibliography ==
- Federico Pistone (2008). Inter 1908-2008: un secolo di passione nerazzurra, 2008 (in Italian). Prodotto Ufficiale F.C. Internazionale 1908, Milano. p. 533 and 534. ISBN 978-88-89370-13-1.
