= List of Inter Milan seasons =

Football Club Internazionale Milano is an Italian professional football club based in Milan, Lombardy. The club was founded on 9 March 1908 as a split between the Milan Cricket and football club. They played their first competitive match on the 10 January 1909 against fellow Milan team AC Milan. The following year, they won their first piece of silverware with the team defeating Pro Vercelli in a championship play-off.

This is a list of seasons played by Inter Milan in Italian and European football. It details the club's achievements in major competitions, managers, and top league goalscorers for each season.

== Key ==
- CL = UEFA Champions League
- EC = European Cup
- EL = UEFA Europa League
- UC = UEFA Cup
- ICFC = Inter-Cities Fairs Cup
- CWC = European Cup Winners' Cup
- USC = UEFA Super Cup
- IC = Intercontinental Cup
- FCWC = FIFA Club World Cup
- MIT = Mitropa Cup
- Pld = Matches played
- W = Matches won
- D = Matches drawn
- L = Matches lost
- GF = Goals for
- GA = Goals against
- Pts = Points
- Pos = Final position
- F = Final
- SF = Semi-finals
- QF = Quarter-finals
- R16 = Round of 16
- R32 = Round of 32
- GS = Group stage
- GS2 = Second group stage
- – = Did not qualify/Tournament did not occur
- QR1 = First qualifying round
- QR2 = Second qualifying round
- QR3 = Third qualifying round
- QR4 = Fourth qualifying round
- RInt = Intermediate round
- R1 = Round 1
- R2 = Round 2
- R3 = Round 3
- R4 = Round 4
- R5 = Round 5
- R6 = Round 6

Winners	Runners-up	Third place	Top goalscorer in Serie A

== Seasons ==
Correct as of the 2025–26 season. (Note: Goal tallies are for the competitions listed only; friendly matches are not included. Divisions are not sorted alphabetically, but based on their placing in the Italian football league system at that time.) (Note: From 1905 until 1993–94, two points were awarded for a win, and one for a draw. From the 1994–95 Serie A season onwards, three points have been awarded for a win.)

Season	League ^{1}									Coppa Italia ^{2}	Supercoppa Italiana ^{3}	UEFA Competitions^{[E]}		Other Competitions	Top goalscorer(s) ^{4}	
Season	Div	Pld	W	D	L	GF	GA	Pts	Pos	Coppa Italia ^{2}	Supercoppa Italiana ^{3}	EC/CL	IC/EL	Other Competitions	Top goalscorer(s) ^{4}	
1908–09	Campionato Federale di Prima Categoria/Lombardia	2	0		2	2	5	0	3rd	–					Achille Gama; Bernard Schuler	1
1909–10	Prima Categoria	16	12	1	3	55	26	25	1st	–					Ernest Peterly	25
1910–11	Prima Categoria	16	6	1	9	24	31	13	6th	–						
1911–12	Prima Categoria	18	10	1	7	42	22	21	4th	–						
1912–13	Prima Categoria	10	6	0	4	24	14	12	3rd	–						
1913–14	Prima Categoria	28	19	4	5	113	41	42	3rd	–					Luigi Cevenini	37
1914–15	Prima Categoria	21	15	2	4	98	22	32	3rd	–					Emilio Agradi	31
No competitive football was played between 1915–1919 due to the First World War
1919–20	Prima Categoria	23	17	5	1	84	28	37	1st	–	–			–	Luigi Cevenini	23
1920–21	Prima Categoria/A	22	13	5	4	81	29	31	3rd	–	–			–	Luigi Cevenini	31
1921–22	Prima Divisione (C.C.I.)/B	22	3	5	14	29	66	11	12th	–	–			–	Ermanno Aebi	6
1922–23	Prima Divisione/A	22	8	5	9	33	37	21	7th	–	–			–	Leopoldo Conti	10
1923–24	Prima Divisione/A	22	11	5	6	31	25	27	3rd	–	–			–	Leopoldo Conti	8
1924–25	Prima Divisione/A	22	12	1	9	44	37	25	4th	–	–			–	Luigi Cevenini	12
1925–26	Prima Divisione	22	10	5	7	44	38	25	5th	–	–			–	Leopoldo Conti	13
1926–27	Divisione Nazionale	28	15	5	8	62	38	35	5th	R3	–			–	Anton Powolny	22
1927–28	Divisione Nazionale	34	14	7	13	67	69	35	7th	–	–			–	Fulvio Bernardini	17
1928–29	Divisione Nazionale/B	30	17	3	10	95	38	37	6th	–	–			–	Giuseppe Meazza	33
1929–30	Serie A	34	22	6	6	85	38	50	1st	–	–			SF^{MIT}	Giuseppe Meazza	31
1930–31	Serie A	34	15	8	11	60	45	38	5th	–	–			–	Giuseppe Meazza	24
1931–32	Serie A	34	15	8	11	67	52	38	6th	–	–			–		
1932–33	Serie A	34	19	8	7	80	53	46	2nd	–	–			Runners-up^{MIT}		
1933–34	Serie A	34	20	9	5	66	24	49	2nd	–	–			R1^{MIT}	Giuseppe Meazza	21
1934–35	Serie A	30	15	12	3	58	24	42	2nd	–	–			R1^{MIT}		
1935–36	Serie A	30	14	8	8	61	34	36	4th	R16	–			SF^{MIT}	Giuseppe Meazza	25
1936–37	Serie A	30	9	13	8	43	35	31	7th	SF	–			–		
1937–38	Serie A	30	16	9	5	57	28	41	1st	SF	–			QF^{MIT}	Giuseppe Meazza	20
1938–39	Serie A	30	14	9	7	55	37	37	3rd	Champions	–			QF^{MIT}	Annibale Frossi; Pietro Ferraris	10
1939–40	Serie A	30	20	4	6	56	23	44	1st	R32	–			–	Umberto Guarnieri	15
1940–41	Serie A	30	14	7	9	52	42	35	2nd	R16	–			–		
1941–42	Serie A	30	7	12	11	31	47	26	12th	R16	–			–		
1942–43	Serie A	30	15	4	11	53	38	34	4th	R16	–			–		
No competitive football was played between 1944 and 1945 due to the Second World War
1945–46	Serie A-B	40	23	7	10	72	37	53	4th	–	–	–	–	–	Enrico Candiani	6
1946–47	Serie A	38	13	10	15	59	54	36	10th	–	–	–	–	–	Cosimo Muci	16
1947–48	Serie A	38	16	5	19	67	60	37	12th	–	–	–	–	–	Bruno Quaresima	16
1948–49	Serie A	38	22	11	5	85	39	55	2nd	–	–	–	–	–	István Nyers	26
1949–50	Serie A	38	21	7	10	99	60	49	3rd	–	–	–	–	–	István Nyers	30
1950–51	Serie A	38	27	5	6	107	43	59	2nd	–	–	–	–	–	István Nyers	31
1951–52	Serie A	38	21	7	10	86	49	49	3rd	–	–	–	–	–	István Nyers	23
1952–53	Serie A	34	19	9	6	46	24	47	1st	–	–	–	–	–	István Nyers	15
1953–54	Serie A	34	20	11	3	67	32	51	1st	–	–	–	–	–	Gino Armano	13
1954–55	Serie A	34	13	10	11	55	49	36	8th	–	–	–	–	–	Gino Armano	14
1955–56	Serie A	34	16	7	11	57	36	39	3rd	–	–	–	GS	–	Benito Lorenzi; Lennart Skoglund	10
1956–57	Serie A	34	11	13	10	53	45	35	5th	–	–	–	GS	–	Oscar Massei	10
1957–58	Serie A	34	10	12	12	36	36	32	11th	GS	–	–	GS	–	Antonio Angelillo	16
1958–59	Serie A	34	20	6	8	77	41	46	3rd	Runners-up	–	–	QF	–	Antonio Angelillo	33
1959–60	Serie A	34	14	12	8	55	43	40	4th	QF	–	–	QF	–	Eddie Firmani	12
1960–61	Serie A	34	18	8	8	73	39	44	3rd	QF	–	–	SF	–	Eddie Firmani	16
1961–62	Serie A	34	19	10	5	59	31	48	2nd	R16	–	–	QF	–	Gerry Hitchens	16
1962–63	Serie A	34	19	11	4	56	20	49	1st	R16	–	–	–	–	Beniamino Di Giacomo	11
1963–64	Serie A	34	23	8	3	54	21	54	2nd	QF	–	Champions	–	–	Jair da Costa	12
1964–65	Serie A	34	22	10	2	68	29	54	1st	Runners-up	–	Champions	–	Champions^{IC}	Sandro Mazzola	17
1965–66	Serie A	34	20	10	4	70	28	50	1st	SF	–	SF	–	Champions^{IC}	Sandro Mazzola	19
1966–67	Serie A	34	19	10	5	59	22	48	2nd	SF	–	Runners-up	–	–	Sandro Mazzola	17
1967–68	Serie A	30	13	7	10	46	34	33	5th	Third place	–	–	–	–	Angelo Domenghini	11
1968–69	Serie A	30	14	8	8	55	26	36	4th	GS	–	–	–	–	Mario Bertini	11
1969–70	Serie A	30	16	9	5	41	19	41	2nd	QF	–	–	SF	–	Roberto Boninsegna	13
1970–71	Serie A	30	19	8	3	50	26	46	1st	GS	–	–	R1	–	Roberto Boninsegna	24
1971–72	Serie A	30	13	10	7	49	28	36	5th	SF	–	Runners-up	–	–	Roberto Boninsegna	22
1972–73	Serie A	30	15	7	8	32	23	37	5th	SF	–	–	R3	–	Roberto Boninsegna	12
1973–74	Serie A	30	12	11	7	47	33	35	4th	SF	–	–	R1	–	Roberto Boninsegna	23
1974–75	Serie A	30	10	10	10	26	26	30	9th	SF	–	–	R2	–	Roberto Boninsegna	9
1975–76	Serie A	30	14	9	7	36	28	37	4th	SF	–	–	–	–	Roberto Boninsegna	10
1976–77	Serie A	30	10	13	7	34	27	33	4th	Runners-up	–	–	R1	–	Carlo Muraro	9
1977–78	Serie A	30	13	10	7	35	24	36	5th	Champions	–	–	R1	–	Alessandro Altobelli	10
1978–79	Serie A	30	10	16	4	38	24	36	4th	QF	–	–	–	QF^{CWC}	Alessandro Altobelli; Carlo Muraro	11
1979–80	Serie A	30	14	13	3	44	25	41	1st	QF	–	–	R2	–	Alessandro Altobelli	15
1980–81	Serie A	30	14	8	8	41	24	36	4th	GS	–	SF	–	–	Alessandro Altobelli	12
1981–82	Serie A	30	11	13	6	39	34	35	5th	Champions	–	–	R2	–	Alessandro Altobelli	9
1982–83	Serie A	30	12	14	4	40	23	38	3rd	SF	–	–	–	QF^{CWC}	Alessandro Altobelli	15
1983–84	Serie A	30	12	11	7	37	23	35	4th	GS	–	–	R3	–	Alessandro Altobelli	10
1984–85	Serie A	30	13	12	5	42	28	38	3rd	SF	–	–	SF	–	Alessandro Altobelli	17
1985–86	Serie A	30	12	8	10	36	33	32	6th	QF	–	–	SF	–	Karl-Heinz Rummenigge	13
1986–87	Serie A	30	15	8	7	32	17	38	3rd	QF	–	–	QF	–	Alessandro Altobelli	11
1987–88	Serie A	30	11	10	9	42	35	32	5th	SF	–	–	R3	–	Alessandro Altobelli	9
1988–89	Serie A	34	26	6	2	67	19	58	1st	GS	–	–	R3	–	Aldo Serena	22
1989–90	Serie A	34	17	10	7	55	32	44	3rd	QF	Champions	R1	–	–	Jürgen Klinsmann	13
1990–91	Serie A	34	18	10	6	56	31	46	3rd	R16	–	–	Champions	–	Lothar Matthäus	16
1991–92	Serie A	34	10	17	7	28	28	37	8th	QF	–	–	R1	–	Jürgen Klinsmann	7
1992–93	Serie A	34	17	12	5	59	36	46	2nd	QF	–	–	–	–	Rubén Sosa	20
1993–94	Serie A	34	11	9	14	46	45	31	13th	QF	–	–	Champions	–	Rubén Sosa	16
1994–95	Serie A	34	14	10	10	39	34	52	6th	R32	–	–	R1	–	Rubén Sosa	8
1995–96	Serie A	34	15	9	10	51	30	54	7th	SF	–	–	R1	–	Marco Branca	17
1996–97	Serie A	34	15	14	5	51	35	59	3rd	SF	–	–	Runners-up	–	Youri Djorkaeff	14
1997–98	Serie A	34	21	6	7	62	27	69	2nd	QF	–	–	Champions	–	Ronaldo	25
1998–99	Serie A	34	13	7	14	59	54	46	8th	SF	–	QF	–	–	Ronaldo	14
1999–2000	Serie A	34	17	7	10	58	36	58	4th	Runners-up	–	–	–	–	Christian Vieri	13
2000–01	Serie A	34	14	9	11	47	47	51	5th	QF	Runners-up	QR3	R4	–	Christian Vieri	18
2001–02	Serie A	34	20	9	5	62	35	69	3rd	R16	–	–	SF	–	Christian Vieri	22
2002–03	Serie A	34	19	8	7	64	38	65	2nd	R16	–	SF	–	–	Christian Vieri	24
2003–04	Serie A	34	17	8	9	59	37	59	4th	SF	–	GS	QF	–	Christian Vieri	13
2004–05	Serie A	38	18	18	2	65	37	72	3rd	Champions	–	QF	–	–	Adriano	16
2005–06	Serie A	38	23	7	8	68	30	76	1st	Champions	Champions	QF	–	–	Julio Cruz	15
2006–07	Serie A	38	30	7	1	80	34	97	1st	Runners-up	Champions	R16	–	–	Zlatan Ibrahimović	15
2007–08	Serie A	38	25	10	3	69	26	85	1st	Runners-up	Runners-up	R16	–	–	Zlatan Ibrahimović	17
2008–09	Serie A	38	25	9	4	70	32	84	1st	SF	Champions	R16	–	–	Zlatan Ibrahimović	25
2009–10	Serie A	38	24	10	4	75	34	82	1st	Champions	Runners-up	Champions	–	–	Diego Milito	22
2010–11	Serie A	38	23	7	8	65	24	76	2nd	Champions	Champions	QF	–	Runners-up^{USC}	Samuel Eto'o	21
2010–11	Serie A	38	23	7	8	65	24	76	2nd	Champions	Champions	QF	–	Champions^{FCWC}	Samuel Eto'o	21
2011–12	Serie A	38	17	7	14	58	55	58	6th	QF	Runners-up	R16	–	–	Diego Milito	24
2012–13	Serie A	38	16	6	16	55	57	54	9th	SF	–	–	R16	–	Rodrigo Palacio	12
2013–14	Serie A	38	15	15	8	62	39	60	5th	R16	–	–	–	–	Rodrigo Palacio	17
2014–15	Serie A	38	14	13	11	59	48	55	8th	QF	–	–	R16	–	Mauro Icardi	22
2015–16	Serie A	38	20	7	11	50	38	67	4th	SF	–	–	–	–	Mauro Icardi	16
2016–17	Serie A	38	19	5	14	72	49	62	7th	QF	–	–	GS	–	Mauro Icardi	24
2017–18	Serie A	38	20	12	6	66	30	72	4th	QF	–	–	–	–	Mauro Icardi	29
2018–19	Serie A	38	20	9	9	57	33	69	4th	QF	–	GS	R16	–	Mauro Icardi	11
2019–20	Serie A	38	24	10	4	81	36	82	2nd	SF	–	GS	Runners-up	–	Romelu Lukaku	23
2020–21	Serie A	38	28	7	3	89	35	91	1st	SF	–	GS	–	–	Romelu Lukaku	24
2021–22	Serie A	38	25	9	4	84	32	84	2nd	Champions	Champions	R16	–	–	Lautaro Martínez	21
2022–23	Serie A	38	23	3	12	71	42	72	3rd	Champions	Champions	Runners-up	–	–	Lautaro Martínez	21
2023–24	Serie A	38	29	7	2	89	22	94	1st	R16	Champions	R16	–	–	Lautaro Martínez	24
2024–25	Serie A	38	24	9	5	79	35	81	2nd	SF	Runners-up	Runners-up	–	Round of 16^{FCWC}	Marcus Thuram	14
2025–26	Serie A	38	27	6	5	89	35	87	1st	Champions	SF	KPO	–	–	Lautaro Martínez	17

- 1. For details of league structure, see Italian football league system.
- 2. The first edition was held in 1922, but the second champions were not crowned until 1936.
- 3. The first edition was held in 1988.
- 4. Only league goals are counted. The Serie A Golden Boot known as Capocannoniere (plural: capocannonieri) is the award given to the highest goalscorer in Serie A.

== Double, Treble, Quadruple and Quintuple ==
- Doubles:
  - Serie A and Coppa Italia: 3
    - 2005–06, 2009–10 and 2025–26 seasons
  - Serie A and European Cup/UEFA Champions League: 2
    - 1964–65 and 2009–10 seasons
  - Coppa Italia and UEFA Champions League: 1
    - 2009–10 season
  - European Cup and Intercontinental Cup: 1
    - 1964–65 season
- Trebles:
  - Continental Treble (Serie A, Coppa Italia, UEFA Champions League): 1
    - 2009–10 season
  - Italian Treble (Serie A, Coppa Italia, Supercoppa Italiana): 1
    - 2005–06
  - Serie A, European Cup, Intercontinental Cup: 1
    - 1964–65 season
  - Coppa Italia, Supercoppa Italiana, FIFA Club World Cup: 1
    - 2010–11 season
- Quadruple:
  - 2009–10 Serie A, 2009–10 Coppa Italia, 2009–10 UEFA Champions League, 2010 FIFA Club World Cup
- Quintuple:
  - 2009–10 Serie A, 2009–10 Coppa Italia, 2009–10 UEFA Champions League, 2010 Supercoppa Italiana, 2010 FIFA Club World Cup
