= Bacchetti =

Bacchetti is an Italian surname. Notable people with the surname include:

- Andrea Bacchetti (musician) (born 1977), Italian pianist
- Andrea Bacchetti (rugby union) (born 1988), Italian rugby union player
- Antonio Bacchetti (1923–1979), Italian footballer
- Loris Bacchetti (born 1993), Italian footballer
