= Pangaro =

Pangaro is an Italian surname. Notable people with the surname include:

- Roberto Pangaro (born 1950), Italian swimmer
- Tristano Pangaro (1922–2004), Italian footballer
