= Sergio Marchi =

Sergio Marchi may refer to:

- Sergio Marchi (footballer) (1920–1979), Italian footballer
- Sergio Marchi (politician) (born 1956), Canadian politician
