= Girotti =

Italian surname

Girotti is an Italian surname. Notable people with the surname include:

- Camillo Girotti (1918–?), Italian footballer
- Federico Girotti (born 1999), Argentine footballer
- Gianfranco Girotti (born 1937), Italian titular bishop
- Giuseppe Girotti (1905–1945), Italian anti-fascist
- Ken Girotti, Canadian television director
- Mario Girotti (general) (1885–1957), Italian Alpini general
- Mario Girotti (born 1939), birth name of Italian actor Terence Hill
- Massimo Girotti (1918–2003), Italian actor
