= La Spezia =

La Spezia A Spèza (Ligurian)
- Comune
- Comune della Spezia
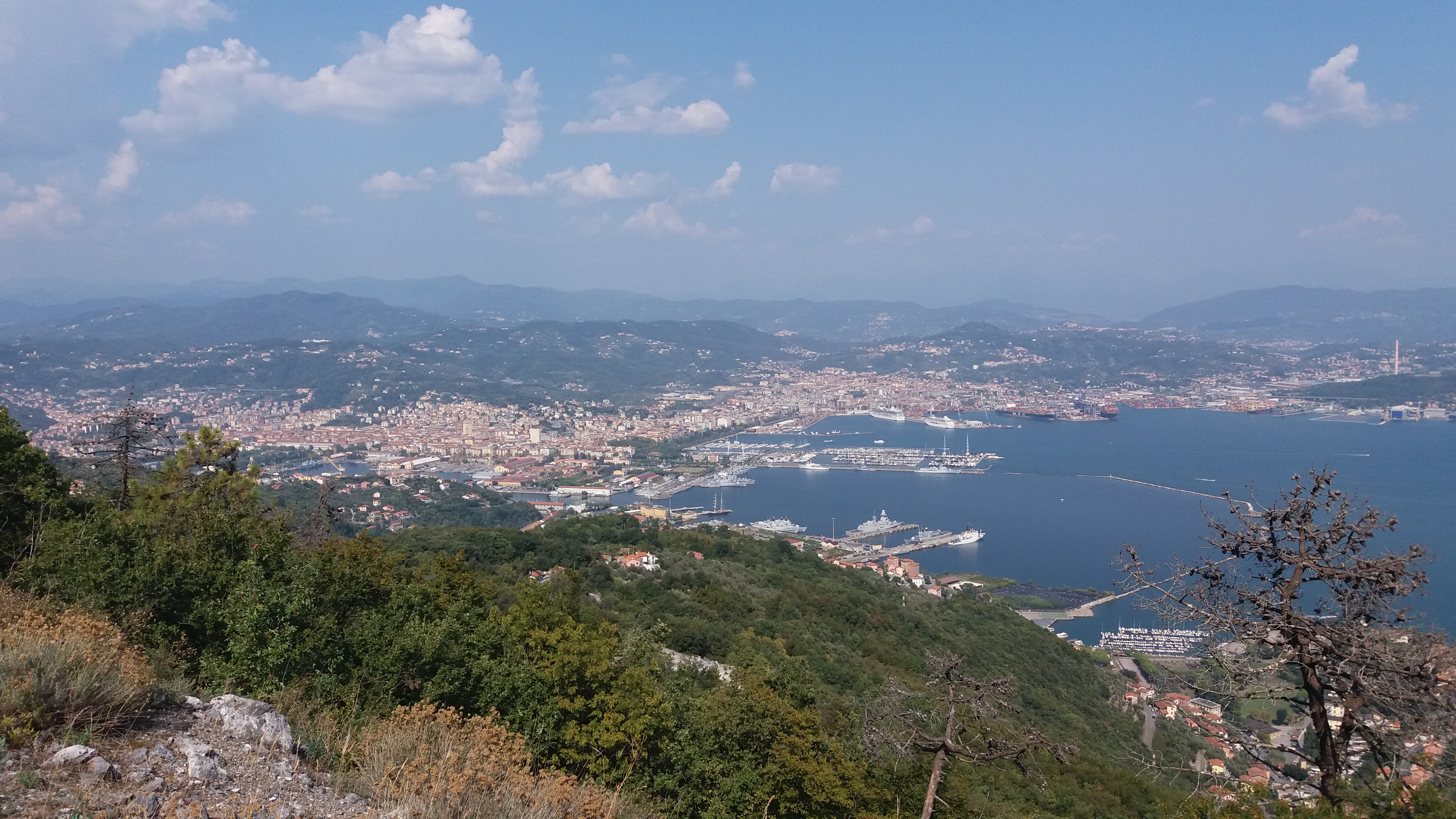
- Panorama of La Spezia

- Flag Coat of arms

- Location of La Spezia in Italy La Spezia (Liguria)
- Coordinates: 44°06′N 09°49′E
- Country: Italy
- Region: Liguria
- Province: La Spezia (SP)
- Frazioni: Biassa, Cadimare, Campiglia, Fabiano Alto/Coregna, Isola di Felettino, Marinasco/Sarbia, Marola, Pitelli, San Venerio/Carozzo

Government
  - Mayor: Pierluigi Peracchini (centre-right)

Area
  - Total: 51.39 km^{2} (19.84 sq mi)
- Elevation: 10 m (33 ft)

Population (2025)
  - Total: 92,711
  - Density: 1,804/km^{2} (4,673/sq mi)
- Demonym: Spezzini
- Time zone: UTC+1 (CET)
  - Summer (DST): UTC+2 (CEST)
- Postal code: 19100, 19121–19126, 19131–19139
- Dialing code: 0187
- Patron saint: Saint Joseph
- Saint day: 19 March
- Website: Official website

La Spezia (Note: UK: /læ ˈspɛtsiə/, US: /lɑː -/ or /lɑː ˈspɛtsiɑː, - ˈspeɪt-/; Italian: [la ˈspɛttsja]; Ligurian: A Spèza, in the local Spezzino dialect) is a city and municipality at the head of the Gulf of La Spezia in the eastern part of the region of Liguria in Italy, the capital of the Province of La Spezia. With a population of 92,711, it is the 2nd-largest municipality in Liguria and the 52-largest in Italy.

La Spezia is the second-largest city in the Liguria region, after Genoa. Located roughly midway between Genoa and Pisa, on the Ligurian Sea, it is one of the main Italian military and commercial harbours and a major Italian Navy base. A popular seaside resort, it is also a significant railway junction, and is notable for its museums, for the Palio del Golfo rowing race, and for railway and boat links with the Cinque Terre.

== History ==
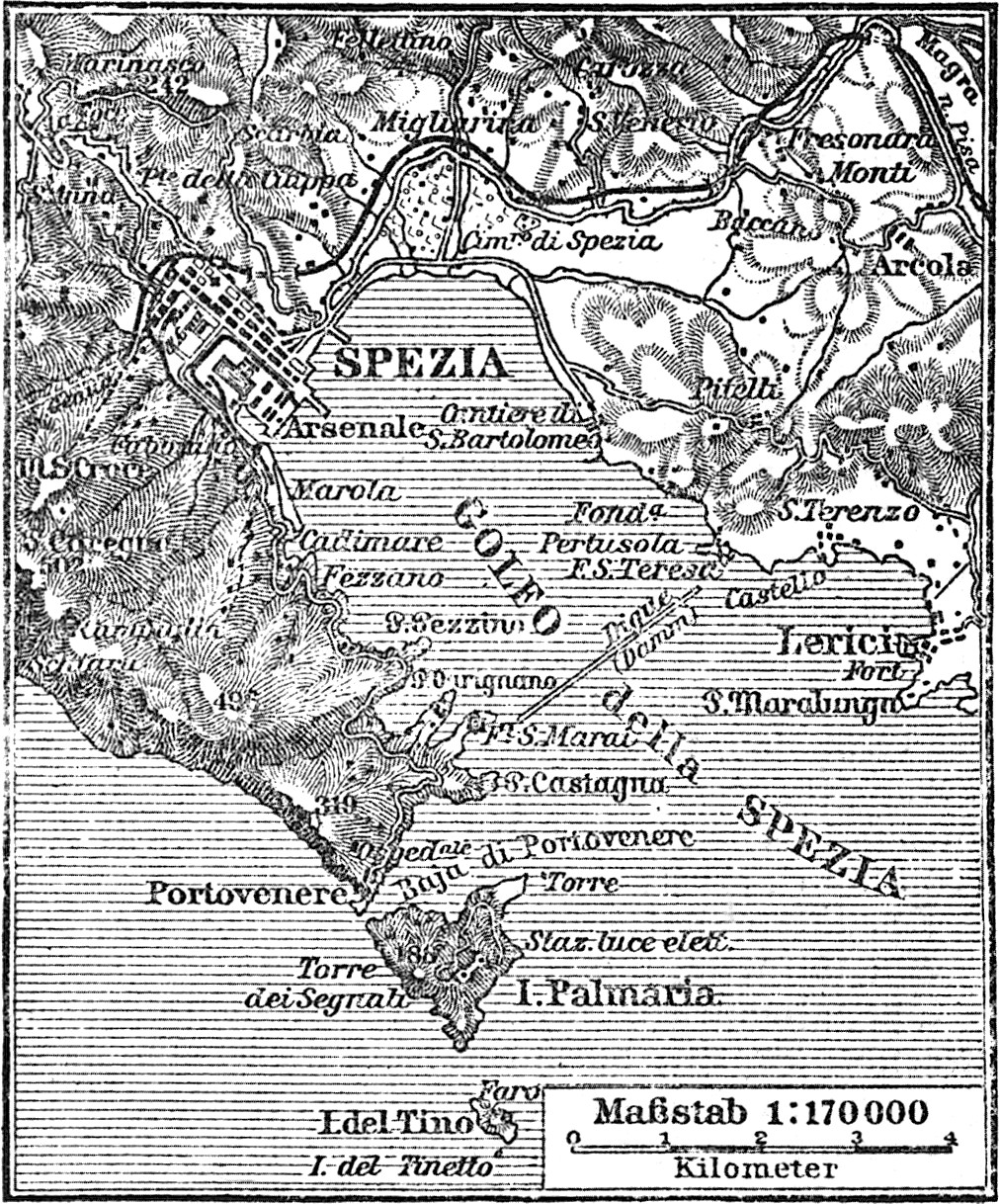
Map of La Spezia (German, late 19th-century)

La Spezia and its province have been settled since prehistoric times. In Roman times the most important centre was Luni, not far from Sarzana. As the capital of the short-lived Niccolò Fieschi Signoria in the period between 1256 and 1273, La Spezia was inevitably linked with Genoese vicissitudes. After the fall of the Republic of Genoa, an independent state until 1797, La Spezia grew, developed and changed, though along lines similar to Liguria's capital Genoa. This Ligurian influence can still be seen in the urban layout as well as in the types of buildings and decorations. This is notable in the carrugio, the narrow street that divides the Old Town into two. It is called Via del Prione, taking its name from the pietrone or large stone, in local dialect prione, where public announcements were once read out.

La Spezia developed substantially after 1861 when the great naval arsenal there was commissioned by the Royal government. In September 1943, after the Italian capitulation to the Allies, it was the departure port for the Italian Navy when it was ordered to steam into British hands at Malta. The Germans arrived too late to stop the departure of the fleet. During the war Italian troopships also left from La Spezia, including the Kaiser Franz Josef, a trans-Atlantic liner launched in Trieste in 1911 for the Austrian Lloyd company, which Italy had confiscated in 1919. It was sunk in La Spezia harbour in 1944.

After the liberation, La Spezia became the point of departure for survivors from Nazi concentration camps. From the summer of 1945 to the spring of 1948 more than 23,000 Jewish displaced persons managed to leave Italy clandestinely for the Palestine Mandate. After lengthy vicissitudes, the ships Fede, Fenice, and Komemiut managed to evacuate everyone from the Golfo di La Spezia, to the extent that on Israeli maps, La Spezia is called Shaʿar Zion, in Hebrew "Gateway to Zion".

== Climate ==
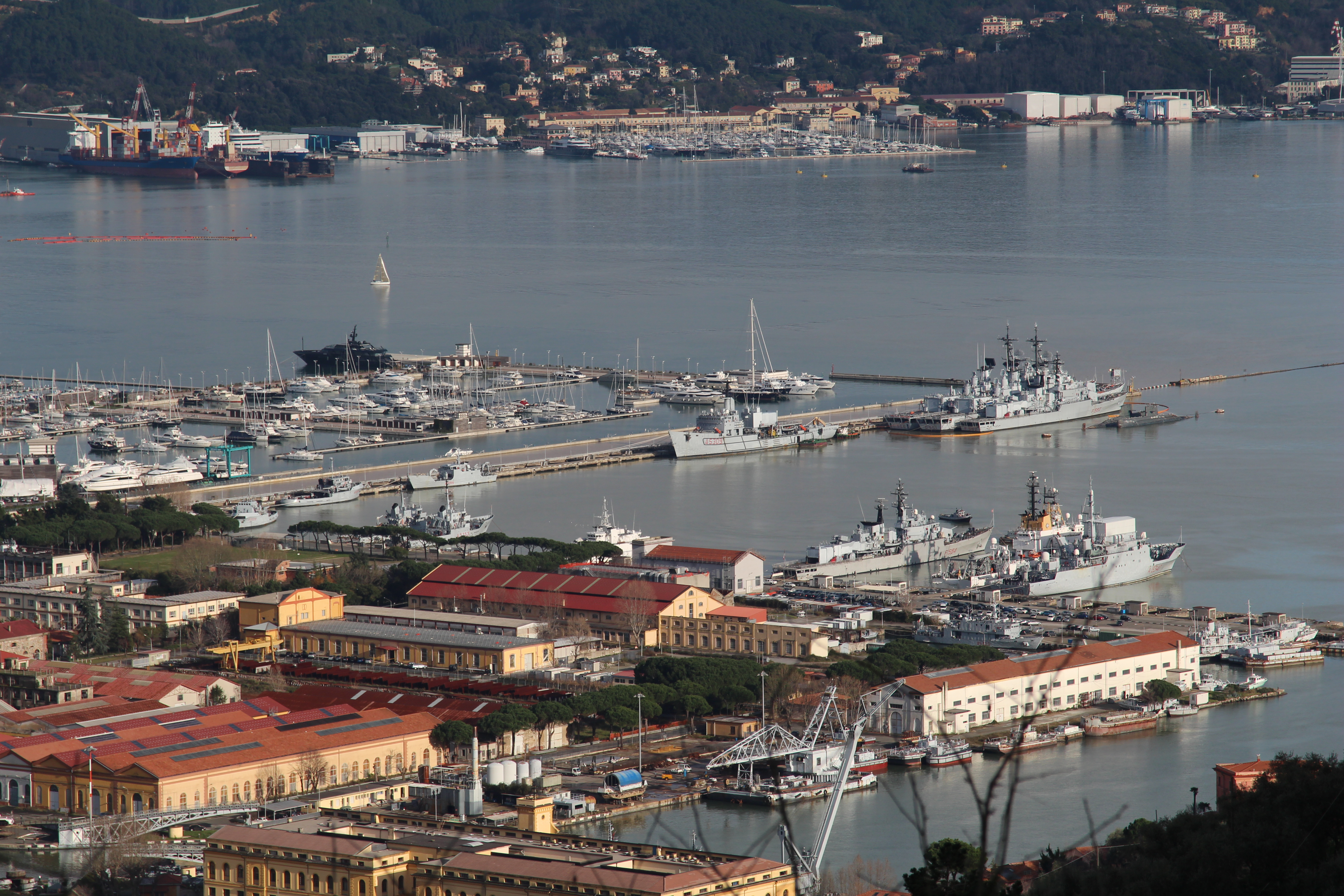
La Spezia port view

La Spezia has a borderline humid subtropical (Cfa) and Mediterranean climate (Csa). The city enjoys hot summers, chilly damp winters and very changeable and rainy autumns and springs. The average temperatures of the coldest month (January) are 4 °C (39 °F) minimum and 11 °C (52 °F) maximum. In the hottest month (July) they are 20 °C (68 °F) minimum and 29 °C (84 °F) maximum. Average annual precipitation is 1,314 millimetres (51.7 in), more than twice that in London. Snow is extremely uncommon. Heavy snowfalls are exceptional events: only in 1985 was a snowfall of more than 50 centimetres (20 in) recorded. Another big snowfall occurred during the night of 18 December 2009, with approximately 25 centimetres (9.8 in) of snow and temperatures as low as −7.4 °C (18.7 °F) in the following nights.

In winter nights, if the sky is clear, temperatures may fall below zero, usually reaching about −2 to −4 °C (28 to 25 °F). Conversely, in summer, especially during sunny days, the temperature can easily exceed 30 °C (86 °F), and sometimes it reaches 35 °C (95 °F). Furthermore, the sensation of heat in summer is increased by the high humidity.

Because of its topography, the city is not exposed to winds from the north, which lap western Liguria, but to those from the southeast. These may bring heavy rain and they can reach 80 kilometres per hour (50 mph), in rare cases causing the blocking of the port. The only northern wind reaching the city is the north-eastern Grecale, common during incursions of Arctic air, when the cold air flowing over the warmer Tyrrhenian sea triggers the formation of low pressures, draining the colder and heavier air trapped in the Po Valley, behind the Apennine Mountains.

Climate data for La Spezia (2004–2020)
Month	Jan	Feb	Mar	Apr	May	Jun	Jul	Aug	Sep	Oct	Nov	Dec	Year
Mean daily maximum °C (°F)	11.9 (53.4)	12.5 (54.5)	14.6 (58.3)	18.7 (65.7)	22.1 (71.8)	26.2 (79.2)	28.9 (84.0)	28.8 (83.8)	25.7 (78.3)	21.1 (70.0)	16.6 (61.9)	13.3 (55.9)	20.0 (68.1)
Daily mean °C (°F)	8.9 (48.0)	9.3 (48.7)	11.4 (52.5)	15.0 (59.0)	18.3 (64.9)	22.2 (72.0)	24.9 (76.8)	24.6 (76.3)	21.6 (70.9)	17.6 (63.7)	13.3 (55.9)	10.1 (50.2)	16.4 (61.6)
Mean daily minimum °C (°F)	5.8 (42.4)	6.2 (43.2)	8.1 (46.6)	11.3 (52.3)	14.5 (58.1)	18.3 (64.9)	20.8 (69.4)	20.3 (68.5)	17.6 (63.7)	14.0 (57.2)	10.1 (50.2)	6.9 (44.4)	12.8 (55.1)
Average precipitation mm (inches)	116 (4.6)	108 (4.3)	115 (4.5)	126 (5.0)	59 (2.3)	51 (2.0)	36 (1.4)	54 (2.1)	84 (3.3)	164 (6.5)	201 (7.9)	200 (7.9)	1,314 (51.8)
Average precipitation days (≥ 1.0 mm)	9	9	10	10	6	6	4	4	6	10	11	12	97
Source 1: Climi e viaggi
Source 2: Enea-Casaccia (precipitation 1961–1990)

== Demographics ==
Historical population
Year	Pop.	±%
1861	15,330	—
1871	26,753	+74.5%
1881	36,046	+34.7%
1901	73,603	+104.2%
1911	77,543	+5.4%
1921	100,383	+29.5%
1931	115,118	+14.7%
1936	106,119	−7.8%
1951	111,849	+5.4%
1961	121,923	+9.0%
1971	124,547	+2.2%
1981	115,392	−7.4%
1991	101,442	−12.1%
2001	91,391	−9.9%
2011	92,659	+1.4%
2021	92,169	−0.5%
Source: ISTAT

As of 2025, La Spezia has a population of 92,711, of whom 48.7% are male and 51.3% are female. Minors make up 14.1% of the population, and seniors make up 26.4%, compared to the Italian average of 14.9% and 24.7% respectively.

=== Foreign population ===
As of 2024, the foreign-born population is 16,030, equal to 17.3% of the population. The 5 largest foreign nationalities are Dominicans (3,077), Albanians (2,288), Bangladeshis (1,642), Moroccans (1,485) and Romanians (1,475).

Foreign population by country of birth (2024)
Country	Population
Dominican Republic	3,077
Albania	2,288
Bangladesh	1,642
Morocco	1,485
Romania	1,475
Ecuador	535
China	393
Ukraine	314
Tunisia	276
Egypt	257
France	217
Nigeria	207
Senegal	198
Poland	196
Pakistan	191

== Sights ==
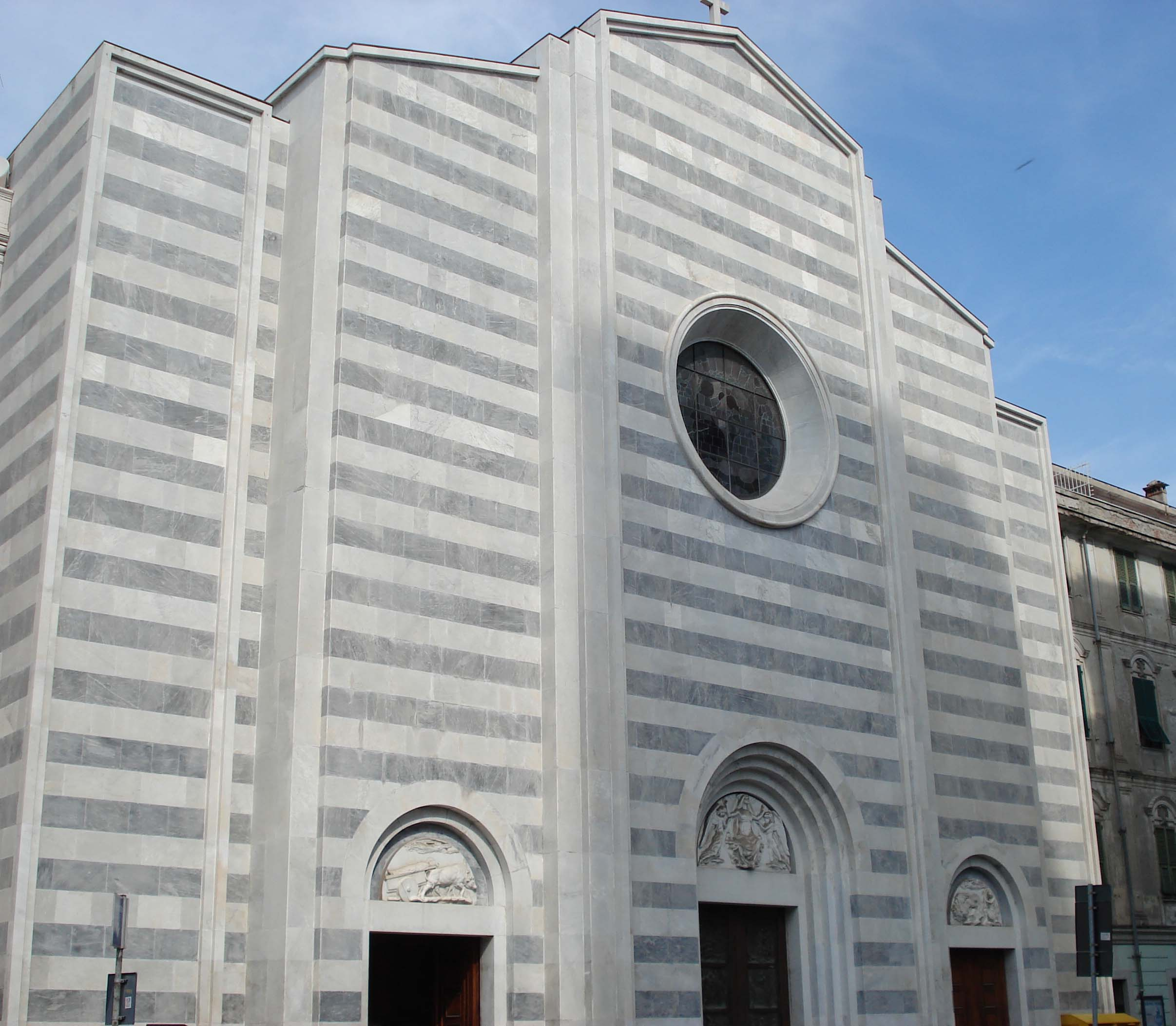
The Church of Our Lady of the Assumption, thirteenth century

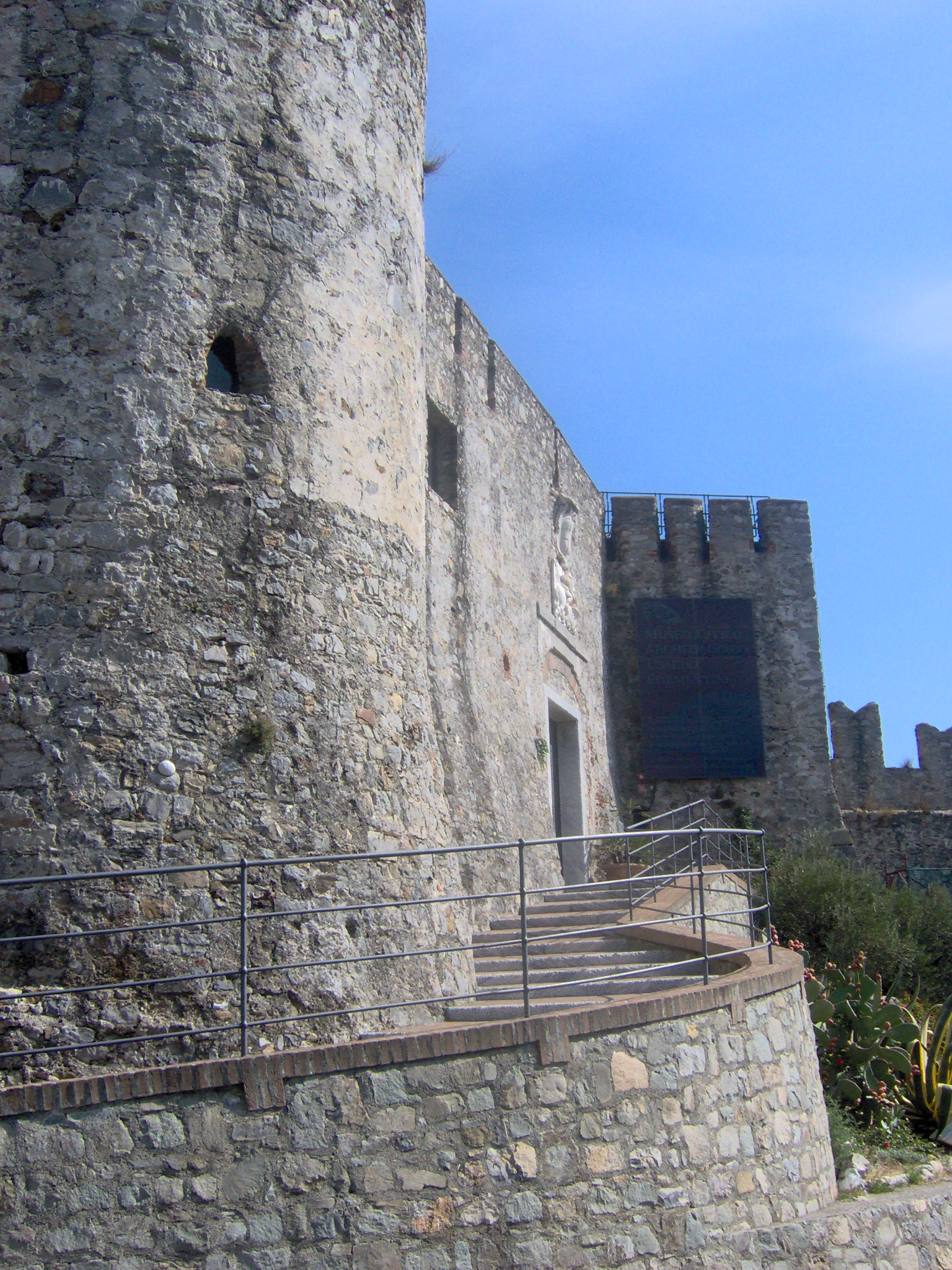
St. George Castle

=== Churches ===
- Cristo Re dei Secoli, modern cathedral, consecrated in 1975, designed by Adalberto Libera.
- Abbey church of Santa Maria Assunta ("Our Lady of the Assumption", thirteenth century). It houses a considerable series of artworks, some of them originally from other suppressed religious institutes. They include an Incoronation of the Virgin by Andrea della Robbia, the Multiplication of Bread by Giovanni Battista Casoni and St. Bartholomew's Martyrdom by Luca Cambiaso.
- Santi Giovanni e Agostino. It has a single nave with eighteenth and nineteenth century decorations.
- Nostra Signora della Scorza. Built in 1900 in Piazza Brin, in the heart of what is now a working-class neighborhood, Quartiere Umbertino.
- Maria Ausiliatrice. Built in the second half of 20th century and administered by the order of Salesiani in the proletarian neighbourhood "Canaletto".
- Nostra Signora del Pianto, a small church which hosts an image of the Blessed Virgin Mary that is believed to be the protagonist of a sorrowful event. Its feast occurs on Pentecost.

=== Museums ===
- Ubaldo Formentini—Civic Museum in the Castle of San Giorgio
- Amedeo Lia Museum
- Palazzina delle Arti and Museum of Seals
- Museum of Modern and Contemporary Art (CAMeC)
- Diocesan Museum
- Ethnographic Civic Museum
- Technical Naval Museum
- National Transportation Museum
- Museum of Radio Electronics and Telecommunications
- Galleria ex Ricovero Antiaereo Quintino Sella

=== Others ===
- Castle of San Giorgio, recently restored, probably originated from a watchtower. A first castle is known to have been built by Niccolò Fieschi in 1262. In 1273 it was destroyed by the Genoese, and a new fortification, along with a new line of walls, was erected by the podesteria of La Spezia from 1371. Annexed to this, the Republic of Genoa added a new castle starting from 1607.
- Public Gardens
- Art Nouveau—style villas
- Futurist mosaic by Prampolini inside the Post Office
- La Spezia is a point of departure for the villages of the Cinque Terre, either by train or boat. The boat also serves Lerici and Portovenere before turning into the open sea toward the Cinque Terre. The Cinque Terre villages are accessible by public transport, 15 kilometres (9 mi) from central railway station.
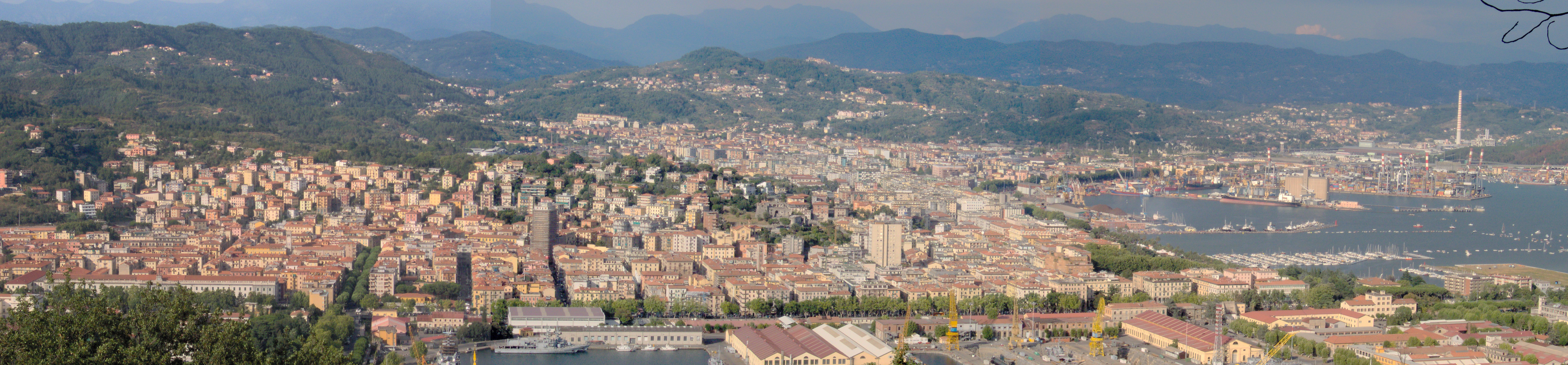
A general view of the city, from the surrounding mountains to the city's port

== Economy ==
Today, La Spezia is the chief Italian naval base and arsenal, and the base for a navy navigation school. It is also a commercial port, with shipyards and industries producing machinery, metal products, and refined petroleum.

== Education ==
Since 2002, a university named G. Marconi has had its headquarters in La Spezia.

The Distretto Ligure delle Tecnologie Marine (DLTM) is a research hub in La Spezia, Italy, focused on blue economy. It's a partnership of more than 20 entities including Fincantieri, Leonardo S.p.A., Intermarine, Rina Service, Consorzio Tecnomar, Autorità portuale, CNR, Camera di Commercio and University of Genoa and one of the five of innovation and research hub in Liguria.

Both the "G. Marconi" pole and the DLTM are hosted in the old building of the Bruno Falcomatà hospital since December 2019.

== Sports ==
In 2020, the local football club, Spezia Calcio, was promoted to the Serie A for the first time in their history.

== Transport ==
=== Buses and trolleybuses ===
La Spezia's public transportation services are managed by ATC La Spezia, which owns urban, suburban and interurban bus routes; as well as the local trolleybus network and other services within the city.

=== Railway ===
The main railway stations in the city are La Spezia Centrale railway station, Migliarina railway station, and Ca' di Boschetti.

== Notable people ==
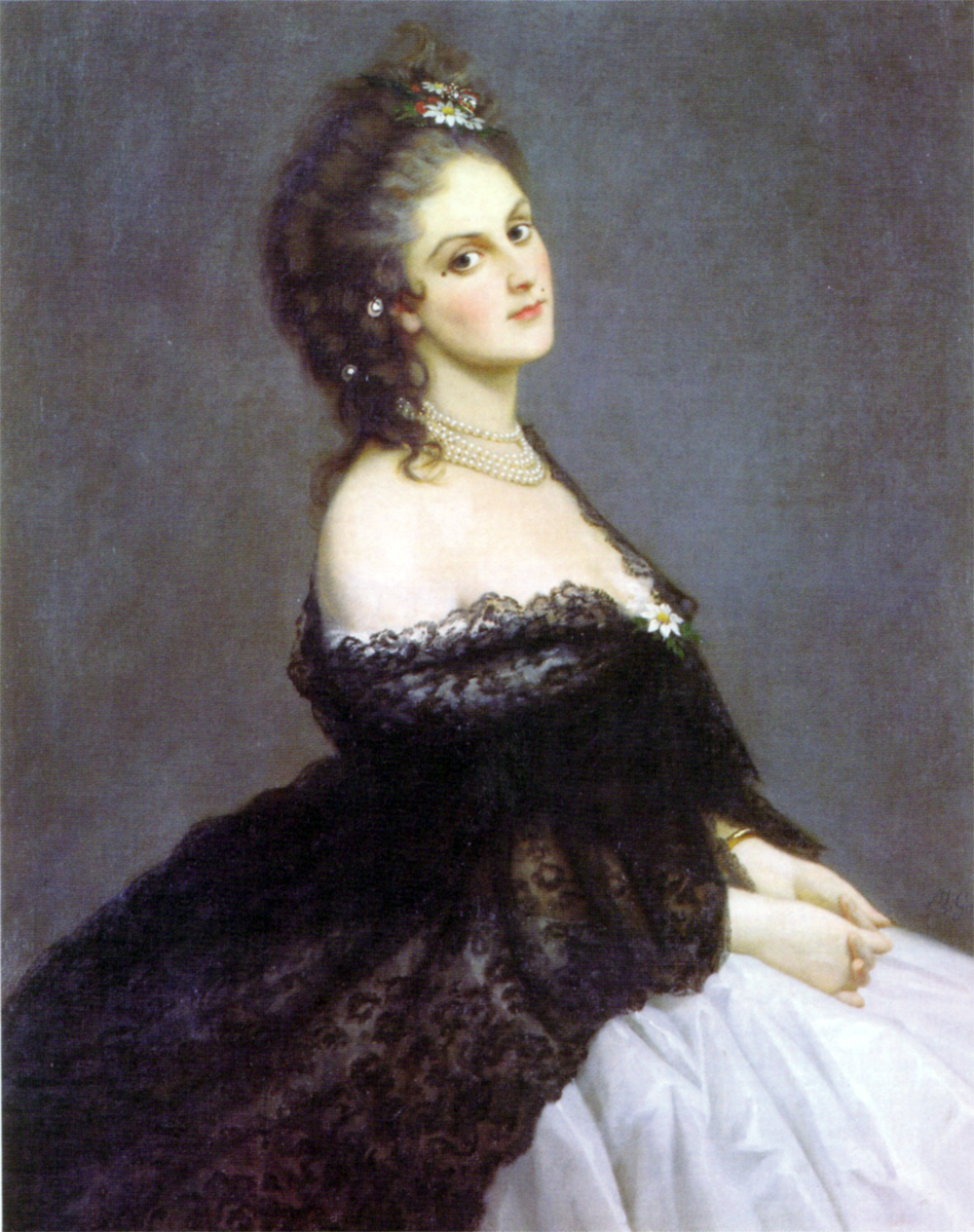
Virginia Oldoini, Countess of Castiglione, 1862

- Alessia Aquilani (born 1967), known as Alexia, singer
- Giulio Cappelli (1911–1995), football player
- Toto Cutugno (1943–2023), singer
- Leonardo D'Imporzano (born 1982), freediver and journalist
- Gian Paolo Dulbecco (born 1941), painter
- Rinaldo Fiumi (born 1923), football player
- Giancarlo Giannini (born 1942), actor
- Ettore Gracis (1915–1992), conductor
- Markus Hinterhäuser (born 1958), Austrian pianist and cultural manager
- Virginia Oldoini (1837–1899), countess of Castiglione
- Eros Pagni (born 1939), actor
- Gaetano Pesce (born 1939), architect designer
- Arrigo Petacco (1929–2018), writer, historian and journalist
- Alessandro Petacchi (born 1974), cyclist
- Lorenzo Richelmy (born 1990), actor
- Gino Rossetti (1904–1992), football player
- Giacinto Scelsi (1905–1988), composer
- Alberto Sorrentino (1916–1994), actor
- Sauro Tomà (1925–2018), football player

== Twin towns and sister cities ==
La Spezia is twinned with:

- Toulon, France
- Bayreuth, Germany
- (United States) Vallejo, USA

== See also ==
- La Spezia–Rimini Line
- Spezia Calcio 1906
- Stadio Alberto Picco

== Sources ==
- Clerici, Carlo Alfredo; Pesaresi, Piero (August–September 1999). "Le difese costiere della Spezia". Uniformi e Armi: 48–53.
