= 1908–09 Inter Milan season =

Inter Milan
1908–1909 season
- Chairman: Giovanni Paramithiotti
- Manager: Virgilio Fossati
- Federal league: 3rd
- Top goalscorer: League: Gama, Schuler (1); All: Gama, Schuler (1)
Home colours
- All statistics correct as of 24 January 1909.

The 1908–09 season was the first competitive season for Internazionale, which was founded in Milan on 9 March 1908.

== Season ==
Internazionale played its first match on 18 October 1908, facing Milan in Switzerland in a friendly in which they lost 2–1. Its first official match was again a derby - about three months later - valid for the qualifications to the domestic championship: this resulted in a second loss, with a 3–2 score for the cross-city rivals. After two weeks, losing also with U.S. Milanese (2–0), the newborn club failed to qualify for the final stage.

== Squad ==
- (Italy) Carlo Cocchi (goalkeeper)
- (Italy) Enrico Du Chene (midfielder)
- (Italy) Virgilio Fossati (midfielder)
- (Brazil) Achille Gama (forward)
- (Switzerland) Carlo Hopf (forward)
- (Italy) Kappler (defender)
- (Switzerland) Werner Kummer (midfielder)
- (Switzerland) Hernst Marktl (defender)
- (Italy) Mario Moretti (defender)
- (Switzerland) Niedermann (defender)
- (Switzerland) Ugo Rietmann (midfielder)
- (Switzerland) Bernard Schuler (forward)
- (Switzerland) Arnaldo Wolkel (midfielder)

Manager: Virgilio Fossati

== Matches ==
=== Lombardy qualifications ===
January 10, 1909 Matchday 1	Milan	3–2	Internazionale	Arena Civica
	Treré; Lana 74'; Laich 86'		Gama 69'; Schuler 88'	Referee: Goodley

January 24, 1909 Matchday 2	Internazionale	0–2	U.S. Milanese	Arena Civica
			Pizzi 5', 42'	Referee: Spensley

== Statistics ==
=== League results ===
Overall								Home						Away					
Pld	W	D	L	GF	GA	GD	Pts	W	D	L	GF	GA	GD	W	D	L	GF	GA	GD
2	0	0	2	2	5	−3	0	0	0	1	0	2	−2	0	0	1	2	3	−1

Last updated: 24 January 1909.
Source: 1908–09 Inter Milan season

=== Players statistics ===
Appearances and goals are referred to domestic league.

Cocchi (2/−6); Du Chene (2); Fossati (2); Hopf (2); Kappler (2); Kummer (2); Marktl (2); Schuler (2/1); Wolkel (2); Gama (1/1); Moretti (1); Niedermann (1); Rietmann (1).
