= Aleksandar Aranđelović =

Yugoslavian footballer (1920–1999)

Personal information
- Date of birth: 18 December 1920
- Place of birth: Crna Trava, Kingdom of SCS
- Date of death: 8 September 1999 (aged 78)
- Place of death: Belgrade, FR Yugoslavia
- Position: Striker

Youth career
- 1932–1938: Jedinstvo Beograd

Senior career*
Years	Team	Apps	(Gls)
1938–1944	Jedinstvo Beograd		
1944–1945	Prva Armija	55	
1945	Metalac Beograd		
1945–1946	Student Beograd		
1946–1947	Red Star Belgrade	6	(1)
1947	AC Milan	0	(0)
1947–1949	Padova	5	(2)
1949–1950	Roma	20	(11)
1950–1951	Novara	26	(9)
1951–1952	Racing Paris	8	(1)
1952–1953	Atlético Madrid	1	(1)

Managerial career
- 1963: South Australia
- * Club domestic league appearances and goals

Aleksandar Aranđelović 18 December 1920 – 8 September 1999) was a Yugoslavian football player and coach. As a player, he played professionally as a striker in Yugoslavia, Italy, France and Spain between 1938 and 1953. As a coach, Aranđelović was active in Canada and Australia.

== Playing career ==
Born in Crna Trava, Aranđelović joined the youth team of Jedinstvo Beograd in 1932, making his senior debut in 1938. He also played in Yugoslavia for Prva Armija, Metalac Beograd, Student Beograd and Red Star Belgrade, in Italy for AC Milan, Padova, AS Roma and Novara, in France for Racing Paris and in Spain for Atlético Madrid.

With Padova he was part of the team that won the 1947–48 Serie B Girone B, earning promotion to Serie A. He played in the Serie A with Padova, AS Roma and Novara until 1951, making a total of 46 Serie A appearances, scoring 20 goals.

== Coaching career ==
Aranđelović later became a football coach in Canada and Australia. In Australia he managed the South Australian state team in 1963.
