= Giuseppe Madini =

Italian footballer

Personal information
- Date of birth: 16 July 1923
- Place of birth: Milan, Italy
- Date of death: 23 October 1998 (aged 75)
- Position: Midfielder

Senior career*
Years	Team	Apps	(Gls)
1942–1943	Vigevano		
1945–1946	Monza	21	(6)
1946–1947	Mantova	25	(3)
1947–1948	Internazionale	6	(1)
1948–1949	Lecce	16	(2)
1949–1950	Varese	38	(16)
1950–1954	Sanremese	81	(?)
1954–1955	Imperia	27	(10)
1955–1956	Savona	23	(9)
- * Club domestic league appearances and goals

Giuseppe Madini (16 July 1923 – 23 October 1998) was an Italian professional football player.
