= Tibor Garay =

Hungarian footballer (born 1923)

Personal information
- Date of birth: 1 January 1923
- Place of birth: Szeged, Hungary
- Position: Forward

Senior career*
Years	Team	Apps	(Gls)
1942–1947	Szegedi LC		
1947–1948	Inter Milan	2	(0)
1948–1949	Pro Patria	11	(0)
1949–1950	Rimini	19	(2)
1951–1952	Colleferro	6	(2)
1952–1955	Toulouse	9	(2)
- Sanse (France)
- * Club domestic league appearances and goals

Tibor Garay (born 1 January 1923) is a Hungarian former professional footballer who played as a forward. He made two Serie A appearances for Inter Milan.
