= Ubaldo Passalacqua =

Italian footballer (born 1918)

Personal information
- Date of birth: 29 May 1918
- Place of birth: Rapolano, Italy
- Position: Defender

Senior career*
Years	Team	Apps	(Gls)
1936–1942	Siena	186	(0)
1942–1949	Internazionale	155	(0)
1949–1950	Pavia	35	(0)
1950–1951	Lecco	12	(0)
- * Club domestic league appearances and goals

Ubaldo Passalacqua (born 29 May 1918 in Rapolano Terme) was an Italian professional football player who played as a defender.
