= Rinaldo Fiumi =

Italian footballer

Personal information
- Date of birth: 2 August 1923
- Place of birth: La Spezia, Kingdom of Italy
- Position: Midfielder

Senior career*
Years	Team	Apps	(Gls)
1941–1942	Spezia	4	(0)
1942–1943	Villafranca		
1943–1944	Spezia	2	(0)
1945–1946	Ausonia Spezia	25	(6)
1946–1947	Spezia	33	(1)
1947–1948	Internazionale	24	(4)
1948–1950	Bari	37	(2)
1950–1953	Spezia	49	(3)
1953–1955	Arsenale Spezia	56	(18)
1955–1957	Spezia	44	(2)
1957–1958	Sammargheritese		
- * Club domestic league appearances and goals

Rinaldo Fiumi (born 2 August 1923) was an Italian professional football player.
