= Ernest Peterly =

Swiss footballer (1892-1955)

Personal information
- Date of birth: 1 January 1892
- Place of birth: Switzerland
- Date of death: 1 December 1955 (aged 63)
- Position: Midfielder

Senior career*
Years	Team	Apps	(Gls)
1907–1909	SC Brühl	?	(?)
1909–1911	Internazionale	22	(30)
1911–1912	SC Brühl	?	(?)
1912–1914	Internazionale	33	(0)
1914–1919	SC Brühl	?	(?)
Total		55	(30)

International career^{‡}
1913–1918	Switzerland	5	(0)
- * Club domestic league appearances and goals as of 24 November 2015 ‡ National team caps and goals as of 24 November 2015

Ernest Peterly (1 January 1892 – December 1955) was a Swiss footballer who played as a midfielder. He spent his whole career playing with SC Brühl in Switzerland and Internazionale in Italy, with whom he won the 1909–10 Italian Football Championship, being the top goal scorer. He also won the 1914–15 Swiss Serie A with SC Brühl, helping the club to win its first ever trophy.

Peterly was also a former Swiss international footballer, representing his country five times between 1913 and 1918.

== Honours ==
Internazionale

- Italian Football Championship: 1909–10

SC Brühl

- Swiss Serie A: 1914–15

Individual

- Capocannoniere: 1909–10
