= Attilio Giovannini =

Italian footballer (1924-2005)

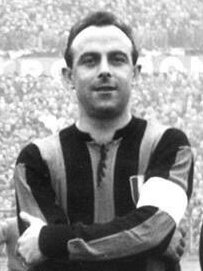

Personal information
- Full name: Attilio Giovannini
- Date of birth: 30 July 1924
- Place of birth: San Michele Extra, Italy
- Date of death: 18 February 2005 (aged 80)
- Place of death: New Fairfield, Connecticut, U.S.
- Height: 1.75 m (5 ft 9 in)
- Position: Defender

Senior career*
Years	Team	Apps	(Gls)
1941–1946	Audace		
1946–1947	Bolzano		
1947–1948	Lucchese	36	(0)
1948–1954	Inter	191	(0)
1954–1956	Lazio	45	(0)

International career
1949–1953	Italy	13	(0)
- * Club domestic league appearances and goals

Attilio Giovannini (Italian pronunciation: [atˈtiːljo dʒovanˈniːni]; 30 July 1924 – 18 February 2005) was an Italian footballer who played as a defender.

== Club career ==
Giovannini debuted in the Italian Serie A with Lucchese before moving to Inter, where he won two consecutive league championships in 1953 and 1954. In 1954 he went to Lazio and at 32 years of age he retired not having scored a single career goal despite playing in 272 games in Serie A.

== International career ==
Giovannini made 13 appearances for the Italy national team, making his debut in 1949. At the 1950 World Cup, he played as a right-sided full-back in the game against Paraguay.

He emigrated to the United States in 1957 and died there in February 2005 at the age of 80.

== Honours ==
Inter

- Serie A: 1953, 1954

== Sources ==
- La Gazzetta dello Sport
