= Camillo Achilli =

Italian footballer and manager (1921-1998)

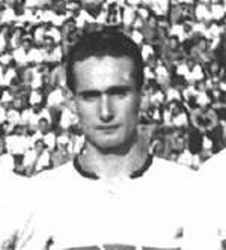

Personal information
- Full name: Camillo Achilli
- Date of birth: 21 August 1921
- Place of birth: Milan, Italy
- Date of death: 14 June 1998 (aged 76)
- Place of death: Milan, Italy
- Position: Midfielder

Youth career
- Internazionale

Senior career*
| Years | Team | Apps | (Gls) |
| 1945–1951 | Internazionale | 197 | (19) |
| 1942–1943 | Caproni | 20 | (0) |
| 1951–1953 | Genoa | 25 | (1) |

Managerial career
- 1956–1959: Lecco
- 1960: Internazionale
- 1960–1961: Alessandria
- 1961–1963: Lecco
- 1966–1967: Palermo
- * Club domestic league appearances and goals

Camillo Achilli (21 August 1921 – 14 June 1998) was an Italian professional footballer who played for Internazionale and Genoa as a midfielder.

After retiring as a player in 1953, Achilli enjoyed a career as a coach, managing sides such as Lecco, Internazionale and Palermo.

== Career ==
From 1942 to 1943, Achilli spent time on loan at Serie C club Caproni.

== Personal life ==
On 14 June 1998, Achilli died at the age of 76.

His son was Marco Achilli, who also played for Inter.
