= Renato Miglioli =

Italian footballer

Personal information
- Date of birth: October 3, 1921
- Place of birth: Caronno Varesino, Italy
- Date of death: 2007
- Position: Midfielder

Senior career*
Years	Team	Apps	(Gls)
1939–1941	Pirelli Milano		
1941–1942	Catania	7	(4)
1946–1947	Gallaratese	37	(6)
1947–1949	Atalanta	70	(10)
1949–1952	Internazionale	84	(9)
1952–1954	Novara	51	(9)
1954–1956	L.R. Vicenza	47	(5)
1956–1957	Cremonese	14	(1)
- * Club domestic league appearances and goals

Renato Miglioli (October 3, 1921 – 2007) was an Italian professional football player.
