= Angelo Franzosi =

Italian footballer (1921–2010)

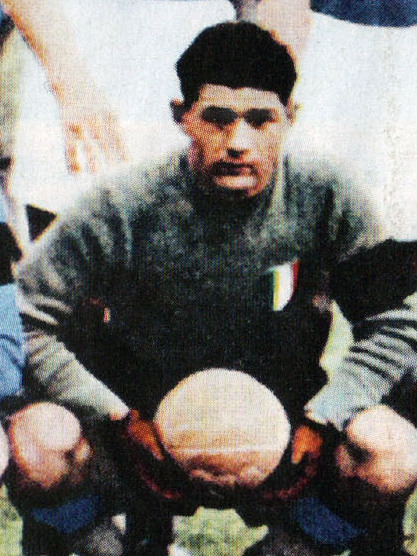
- Franzosi in 1949

Personal information
- Date of birth: 7 November 1921
- Place of birth: Milan, Kingdom of Italy
- Date of death: 8 February 2010 (aged 88)
- Place of death: Milan, Italy
- Height: 1.71 m (5 ft 7 in)
- Position: Goalkeeper

Senior career*
Years	Team	Apps	(Gls)
1941–1951	Inter Milan	226	(0)
1951–1956	Genoa	125	(0)
1956–1957	Lecco	15	(0)
Total		366	(0)

International career
1947–1949	Italy	2	(0)

Managerial career
- 1963–1964: Alessandria
- 1970–1971: Piacenza
- 1974: Solbiatese
- * Club domestic league appearances and goals

Angelo "Nani" Franzosi (Italian pronunciation: [ˈandʒelo franˈtsoːzi; -oːsi]; 7 November 1921 – 8 February 2010) was an Italian professional football player and manager. He played as a goalkeeper.
