= Oscar Basso =

Argentine footballer

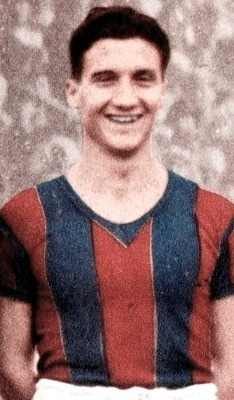

Personal information
- Full name: Oscar Alberto Américo Basso
- Date of birth: April 24, 1922
- Place of birth: Buenos Aires, Argentina
- Date of death: May 25, 2007 (aged 85)
- Position: Defender

Senior career*
Years	Team	Apps	(Gls)
1941	Tigre	25	(0)
1942	River Plate	2	(0)
1943–1949	San Lorenzo de Almagro		
1949–1950	Internazionale	26	(0)
1950–1954	San Lorenzo de Almagro		
1955–1957	Botafogo		
1958–1959	Vasco da Gama		
- * Club domestic league appearances and goals

Oscar Alberto Américo Basso (April 24, 1922 – May 25, 2007) was an Argentine professional footballer.

Overall, he played 209 games and scored 12 goals for San Lorenzo de Almagro.

== Personal life ==
Basso is the grandfather of footballer Agustín García Basso.

== Honours ==
- Primera División Argentina champion: 1946.
