= Camillo Girotti =

Italian footballer (born 1918)

Personal information
- Date of birth: 27 February 1918
- Place of birth: Bareggio, Italy
- Position: Defender

Senior career*
Years	Team	Apps	(Gls)
1938–1939	Ambrosiana-Inter	0	(0)
1939–1940	Lecco	22	(3)
1940–1944	Ambrosiana-Inter	43	(0)
1944–1945	Lecco	12	(0)
1945–1946	Internazionale	3	(0)
1946–1947	Parma	27	(0)
- * Club domestic league appearances and goals

Camillo Girotti (born 27 February 1918) was an Italian professional football player.

== Honours ==
- Coppa Italia winner: 1938/39
