= Virgilio Fossati =

Italian footballer and manager

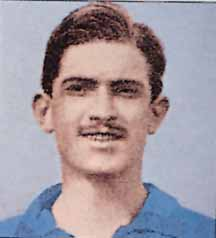

Personal information
- Date of birth: 3 January 1891
- Place of birth: Milan, Italy
- Date of death: 29 June 1916 (aged 25)
- Place of death: near Monfalcone, Italy
- Position: Midfielder

Senior career*
Years	Team	Apps	(Gls)
1909–1915	Inter Milan	97	(4)

International career
1910–1915	Italy	12	(1)

Managerial career
- 1909–1915: Inter Milan
- * Club domestic league appearances and goals

Virgilio Fossati (Italian pronunciation: [virˈdʒiːljo fosˈsaːti]; 3 January 1891 – 29 June 1916) was an Italian footballer and manager. A midfielder, he played for and coached Italian club Inter Milan, also representing the Italy national team; he captained both teams throughout his career.

== Career ==
Fossati spent his entire career with Inter Milan. He played 97 times for the club and scored 4 goals. Throughout his career, Fossati served as Inter and Italy's captain and also the first Inter player to play with the Italy national team. On 15 May 1910, he scored in Italy's first official match, a 6–2 win over France. He was also the first Player-coach for Inter from 1909 until 1915.

Fossati's career was ended by World War I. He died on 29 June 1916 near Monfalcone during the preparation of the Sixth Battle of the Isonzo between the Italian and Austrian armies.

His brother Giuseppe (born 1894) played 43 matches in three years with Inter.
