= Antonio Bacchetti =

Italian footballer (1923–1979)

Personal information
- Date of birth: 17 March 1923
- Place of birth: Codroipo, Italy
- Date of death: 9 May 1979 (aged 56)
- Place of death: Udine, Italy
- Height: 1.82 m (5 ft 11 1/2 in)
- Position: Midfielder

Senior career*
Years	Team	Apps	(Gls)
1940–1941	Potenza	15	(1)
1941–1942	Savoia	1	(0)
1942–1943	Udinese	0	(0)
1943–1944	Cormonese	12	(0)
1945–1947	Atalanta	22	(4)
1947–1948	Lucchese	5	(0)
1948–1949	Internazionale	4	(0)
1949–1950	Brescia	21	(7)
1950–1953	Napoli	42	(13)
1953–1954	Torino	8	(0)
1954–1955	Crotone	12	(1)
1955–1957	Cividalese		
- * Club domestic league appearances and goals

Antonio Bacchetti (17 March 1923 – 9 May 1979) was an Italian footballer.
