= Luciano Gariboldi =

Italian footballer (1927–1988)

Personal information
- Date of birth: 18 August 1927
- Place of birth: Milan, Italy
- Date of death: 18 February 1988 (aged 60)
- Position: Defender

Senior career*
Years	Team	Apps	(Gls)
1945–1946	Stradellina	29	(0)
1946–1949	Internazionale	33	(0)
1949–1953	Atalanta	117	(0)
1953–1954	Verona	28	(2)
1954–1955	Pro Patria	17	(1)
1955–1959	Bari	108	(1)
1959–1961	Reggiana	50	(1)
1961–1964	Lilion Snia Varedo	42	(0)
- * Club domestic league appearances and goals

Luciano Gariboldi (18 August 1927 – 18 February 1988) was an Italian professional football player.
