= Giuseppe Arezzi =

Italian footballer

Personal information
- Date of birth: 1 March 1917
- Place of birth: Pontecurone, Italy
- Date of death: 17 June 1990 (aged 73)
- Place of death: Pavia, Italy
- Position: Midfielder

Senior career*
Years	Team	Apps	(Gls)
1936–1938	Vogherese		
1938–1939	Forlimpopoli		
1939–1940	Forlì		
1940	Venezia	0	(0)
1941	Pavese		
1941–1942	Padova	28	(4)
1942–1943	Modena	11	(0)
1943–1944	Varese	21	(2)
1944–1945	Pavia		
1945–1947	Alessandria	67	(9)
1947–1948	Internazionale	26	(1)
1948–1952	Alessandria	122	(22)
- * Club domestic league appearances and goals

Giuseppe Arezzi (Italian pronunciation: [dʒuˈzɛppe aˈrettsi]; Pontecurone 1 March 1917 – Pavia 17 June 1990), was an Italian footballer.

== Club career ==
Arezzi began his career with Vogherese. In 1938 he moved to Forlimpopoli and then to Forlì. Between 1940 and 1941 he played for Venice and Pavia.

From 1941 until 1952 he played for Padova, Modena, Varese, Pavia, Alessandria and Inter. With Inter he played only one season totalling 26 presences and one goal. In career he wins two championships of Series B, respectively with Modena and Alessandria.
