= Tristano Pangaro =

Italian footballer

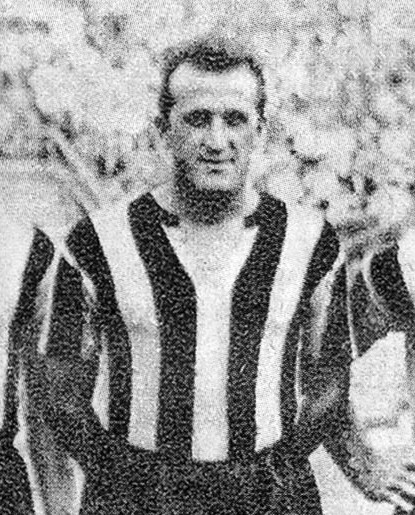
- Pangaro with Inter Milan in the 1948–49 season

Personal information
- Date of birth: June 27, 1922
- Place of birth: Monfalcone, Italy
- Position: Right-back

Senior career*
Years	Team	Apps	(Gls)
1941–1944	Monfalcone		
1945–1947	Pro Gorizia		
1947–1949	Internazionale	38	(0)
1949–1950	Empoli	29	(0)
1950–1951	Salernitana	31	(0)
1951–1952	→ Molfetta (loan)		
1952–1953	Salernitana	2	(0)
1953–1955	Marsala		
- * Club domestic league appearances and goals

Tristano Pangaro (June 27, 1922 in Monfalcone – 2004) was an Italian professional footballer who played as a right-back.
