= Raffaele Guaita =

Italian footballer (1922–1996)

Personal information
- Date of birth: June 26, 1922
- Place of birth: Vigevano, Italy
- Date of death: May 1, 1996 (aged 73)
- Position: Defender

Senior career*
Years	Team	Apps	(Gls)
1941–1943	Vigevano		
1944–1945	Vigevano		
1945–1950	Internazionale	60	(0)
1950–1952	SPAL	54	(0)
1952–1953	Genoa	0	(0)
1953–1955	Vigevano		
- * Club domestic league appearances and goals

Raffaele Guaita (June 26, 1922 – May 1, 1996) was an Italian professional football player. He was born in Vigevano.
