= Sergio Marchi (footballer) =

Italian footballer

Personal information
- Date of birth: 22 May 1920
- Place of birth: Pisa, Kingdom of Italy
- Date of death: 16 December 1979 (aged 59)
- Place of death: Pisa, Italy
- Height: 1.81 m (5 ft 11 1/2 in)
- Position: Defender

Senior career*
Years	Team	Apps	(Gls)
1936–1938	Pisa	42	(2)
1938–1943	Genova 1893	132	(0)
1943–1944	Pisa		
1944–1945	Milano	17	(0)
1945–1948	Internazionale	88	(0)
1948–1950	Cagliari	32	(0)

International career
1939	Italy	1	(0)
- * Club domestic league appearances and goals

Sergio Marchi (Italian pronunciation: [ˈsɛrdʒo ˈmarki]; born 22 May 1920 – 16 December 1979) was an Italian professional footballer who played as a defender.
