= Franco Pian =

Italian footballer (1922–2019)

Personal information
- Date of birth: 16 February 1922
- Place of birth: Gradisca d'Isonzo, Italy
- Date of death: 18 January 2019 (aged 96)
- Place of death: Milan, Italy
- Position: Defender

Senior career*
Years	Team	Apps	(Gls)
1940–1941	Pieris		
1941–1942	SPAL	21	(1)
1942–1943	Pro Gorizia		
1945–1947	Pro Gorizia		
1947–1950	Internazionale	52	(0)
1950–1956	Legnano	183	(0)
1956–1957	Biellese	13	(0)
- * Club domestic league appearances and goals

Franco Pian (16 February 1922 – 18 January 2019) was an Italian professional football player. Pian died in January 2019 at the age of 96.
