= Cosimo Muci =

Italian footballer

Personal information
- Date of birth: 14 May 1920
- Place of birth: Novara, Italy
- Date of death: 1 February 1992 (aged 71)
- Position: Striker

Senior career*
Years	Team	Apps	(Gls)
1939–1945	Novara	87	(27)
1945–1948	Internazionale	86	(29)
1948–1950	Vicenza	79	(18)
1950–1951	Pro Patria	9	(4)
1951–1953	Marzoli Palazzolo		
- * Club domestic league appearances and goals

Cosimo Muci (14 May 1920, in Novara – 1 February 1992) was an Italian professional football player, whose career spanned from 1940 through 1953.
