= Gustavo Fiorini =

Italian footballer

Personal information
- Date of birth: 7 April 1919
- Place of birth: Budrio, Italy
- Position: Midfielder

Senior career*
Years	Team	Apps	(Gls)
1936–1942	Anconitana	111	(48)
1942–1943	Liguria	18	(1)
1943–1944	Forlì	6	(0)
1945–1946	Sampierdarenese	22	(7)
1946–1947	Sampdoria	31	(10)
1947–1950	Internazionale	33	(5)
1950–1953	Anconitana		
1953–1955	Piombino	51	(2)
- * Club domestic league appearances and goals

Gustavo Fiorini (born 7 April 1919 in Budrio) was an Italian professional football player.
