= 1969 in association football =

The following are the football (soccer) events of the year 1969 throughout the world.

== Events ==
- Copa Libertadores 1969: Won by Estudiantes de La Plata after defeating Nacional on an aggregate score of 3–0.
- May 28 – A.C. Milan defeats Ajax, 4–1, to win their second European Cup.
- September 9 – Dutch side FC Twente makes its European debut with a defeat (2–0) in France against FC Rouen.

== Winners club national championship ==
=== Asia ===
- Qatar: Al-Oruba

=== Europe ===
- England: Leeds United
- France: AS Saint-Étienne
- Hungary: Újpest FC
- Italy: ACF Fiorentina
- Netherlands: Feyenoord
- Scotland: Celtic
- Spain: Real Madrid
- Turkey: Galatasaray S.K.
- West Germany: Bayern Munich

=== North America ===
- Mexico: Cruz Azul
- United States / Canada:
  - Kansas City Spurs (NASL)

=== South America ===
- Argentina
  - Chacarita Juniors – Metropolitano
  - Boca Juniors – Nacional
- Brazil: Palmeiras
- Chile: Universidad de Chile
- Paraguay: Club Guaraní

== International tournaments ==
- 1969 British Home Championship (May 3–10, 1969)

England

== Births ==
- January 4 – Kees van Wonderen, Dutch manager and former footballer
- January 10 – Robert Maaskant, Dutch manager and former footballer
- January 12 – Robert Prosinečki, Croatian footballer
- January 24
  - Silvan Inia, retired Dutch footballer
  - Carlos Soca, retired Uruguayan footballer
- February 2 – Helmut Lorenz, retired Austrian footballer
- February 21 – Lukas Tudor, retired Chilean footballer
- March 1 – Vicente Simón, retired Spanish footballer
- March 21
  - Ali Daei, Iranian manager and former footballer
  - Eber Moas, retired Uruguayan footballer
- April 20 – Diego Herrera, retired Ecuadorian footballer
- April 21 – Andros Christofi, retired Cypriot footballer
- April 25 – Peter Kobel, retired Swiss footballer
- May 10 – Dennis Bergkamp, Dutch manager and former footballer
- May 20 – Gilles Hampartzoumian, retired French footballer
- June 15 – Oliver Kahn, retired German footballer
- June 17 – Brian Tevreden, retired Dutch footballer
- June 18 – Wojciech Tomasiewicz, retired Polish footballer
- June 25 – Jurgen Streppel, Dutch manager and former footballer
- July 13 – David Gipp, retired English footballer
- July 24 – Michalis Christofi, retired Cypriot footballer
- August 15 – Carlos Roa, Argentine professional coach and former footballer
- September 4 – Silviano Delgado, retired Mexican footballer
- September 9 – Gert Aandewiel, Dutch manager and former footballer
- September 15
  - Energio Díaz, retired Ecuadorian footballer
  - Roberto Solozábal, retired Spanish footballer
- September 20 – Richard Witschge, Dutch professional coach and former footballer
- September 27 – Mark Wrench, retired English footballer
- October 13 – José Eduardo Pavez, retired Mexican footballer
- October 17 – Gennadi Strikalov, Russian professional coach and former footballer
- October 23 – Ricardo Cadena, Mexican professional coach and former footballer
- October 26 – César Obando, retired Honduran footballer
- November 5 – Roy Pagno, retired Swiss footballer
- November 12 – David Rangel, Mexican manager and former footballer
- November 19 – Igor Pamić, Croatian manager and former footballer
- November 25 – Mark Quamina, retired English footballer
- November 26 – Robert Barnes, retired English footballer
- November 27 – Hermán Gaviria, retired Colombian footballer
- November 29 – Tomas Brolin, retired Swedish footballer
- November 29 – Pierre van Hooijdonk, retired Dutch footballer and manager
- December 3 – Jan Ekholm, retired Swedish footballer
- December 5 – David Villabona, retired Spanish footballer
- December 6 – Jörg Heinrich, German manager and former footballer
- December 28 – Alberto Macías, retired Mexican footballer
- December 28 – Juan Reynoso, Peruvian manager and former footballer

== Deaths ==
- January 8 – Elmar Kaljot, Estonian footballer and coach. (68)
- June 30 – Domingo Tejera, Uruguayan defender, winner of the 1930 FIFA World Cup. (69)
- July 24 - Wilhelm Trautmann, German footballer. (81)
- August 14 – Bruno Chizzo, Italian midfielder, winner of the 1938 FIFA World Cup. (53)
- September 6 – Arthur Friedenreich, Brazilian striker, claimed to have scored 1329 goals in 1239 matches. (77)
- October 11 – Enrique Ballestrero, Uruguayan goalkeeper, winner of the 1930 FIFA World Cup. (64)
- November 9 - Paul Berth, Danish footballer. (79)
- November 26 - Gyula Mándi, Hungarian footballer and manager. (70)
