= 1951–52 Inter Milan season =

Inter Milan
1951–52 season
- President: Carlo Masseroni
- Manager: Aldo Olivieri
- Stadium: San Siro; Arena Civica (some matches)
- Serie A: 3rd
- Top goalscorer: Nyers (23)
Home colours

During the 1951–52 season Inter Milan competed in Serie A.

== Summary ==
During summer the club had several transfers in such as: GoalkeeperGiorgio Ghezzi from Modena, midfielders Maino Neriand Pietro Broccini, Forward Giovanni Invernizzi back from Genoa after a loan ended. Also arrived Forwards Giovanni Migliorini from Como and Marco Savioni. The squad barely reinforced by President Carlo Masseroni, suffered the decline of Skoglund and Wilkes not being competitive against its arch-rivals Juventus and AC Milan during the campaign and finished in a disappointing third spot in League.

== Squad ==
- .-Source:

Note: Flags indicate national team as defined under FIFA eligibility rules; some limited exceptions apply. Players may hold more than one non-FIFA nationality.

Pos.	Nation	Player
GK	ITA	Giorgio Ghezzi
GK	ITA	Livio Puccioni
DF	ITA	Giovanni Giacomazzi
DF	ITA	Attilio Giovannini
DF	ITA	Renato Miglioli
DF	ITA	Bruno Padulazzi
DF	ITA	Ivano Blason
MF	ITA	Pietro Broccini
MF	ITA	Giovanni Invernizzi

Pos.	Nation	Player
MF	ITA	Osvaldo Fattori
MF	ITA	Giovanni Migliorini
MF	ITA	Maino Neri
MF	SWE	Lennart Skoglund
MF	NED	Faas Wilkes
FW	ITA	Benito Lorenzi
FW	ITA	Gino Armano
FW	HUN	István Nyers
FW	ITA	Marco Savioni

=== Transfers ===
In
Pos.	Name	from	Type
GK	Giorgio Ghezzi	Modena	–
MF	Maino Neri	Modena	–
MF	Pietro Broccini	Venezia	–
FW	Giovanni Invernizzi	Genoa	loan ended
FW	Giovanni Migliorini	Como	–
FW	Marco Savioni	Casale	–

Out
Pos.	Name	To	Type
GK	Angelo Franzosi	Genoa	
MF	Camillo Achilli	Genoa	
FW	Lucio Rossetti	Genoa	
FW	Nerio Manzardo	Catania	
FW	Enzo Bearzot	Catania	
FW	Piero Pozzi	Torino	

== Competitions ==
=== Serie A ===
==== League table ====
Pos	Team	Pld	W	D	L	GF	GA	GD	Pts	Qualification or relegation
1	Juventus (C)	38	26	8	4	98	34	+64	60	1952 Latin Cup
2	Milan	38	20	13	5	87	41	+46	53	
3	Internazionale	38	21	7	10	86	49	+37	49	
4	Fiorentina	38	17	9	12	52	38	+14	43	
4	Lazio	38	15	13	10	60	49	+11	43	

Source: Panini
(C) Champions

==== Results by round ====
Round	1	2	3	4	5	6	7	8	9	10	11	12	13	14	15	16	17	18	19	20	21	22	23	24	25	26	27	28	29	30	31	32	33	34	35	36	37	38	39	40
Ground	H	A	H	A	H	A	H	A	H	H	A	H	A	H	A	A	H	A	H	H	A	H	A	H	A	H	H	A	H	H	A	H	A	H	A	H	H	A	H	A
Result	W	D	W	W	W	L	W	D	D	W	L	W	L	-	W	L	W	W	-	D	W	W	W	D	L	W	W	W	W	L	L	W	W	D	L	L	W	W	D	L
Position	1	3	2	1	1	3	3	3	3	3	4	3	4	4	3	3	3	3	3	3	3	3	3	3	3	3	2	2	2	3	3	3	3	3	3	3	3	3	3	3

Source: http://calcio-seriea.net/allenatori_squadra/1948/284/
A = Away; H = Home; W = Win; D = Draw; L = Loss; = Leader, 1949 Latin Cup; = Relegation to 1949–50 Serie B

==== Matches ====
- .- Source:http://calcio-seriea.net/partite/1952/359/

9 September 1951 1	Inter	5–1	Triestina	Milan
	Skoglund 17'; Armano 21'; Nyers 22', 60', 69' (pen.)		36' Kaiml	Stadium: Stadio San Siro; Referee: Silvano (Turin)

16 September 1951 2	Palermo	1–1	Inter	Palermo
	Gimona 4'		26' Wilkes	Stadium: Stadio La Favorita; Referee: Bernardi (Bologna)

23 September 1951 3	Inter	4–0	Atalanta	Milan
	Lorenzi 33', 78'; Nyers 66', 88' (pen.)			Stadium: Stadio San Siro; Referee: Cartei (Florence)

30 September 1951 4	SS Lazio	1–2	Inter	Rome
	Sukru 63' (pen.)		20' Lorenzi; 44' (o.g.) Magrini	Stadium: Stadio Nazionale; Referee: Agnolin (Bassano del Grappa)

7 October 1951 5	Inter	2–0	Torino	Milan
	Wilkes 22'; Lorenzi 40'			Stadium: Stadio San Siro; Referee: Rigato (Mestre)

14 October 1951 6	SSC Napoli	1–0	Inter	Naples
	Granata 14'			Stadium: Stadio del Vomero; Referee: Bernardi (Bologna)

21 October 1951 7	Inter	3–1	Legnano	Milan
	Nyers 22', 52', 89'		31' Palmér	Stadium: Stadio San Siro; Referee: Liverani (Turin)

28 October 1951 8	SPAL	1–1	Inter	Ferrara
	Quaresima 34'		14' Wilkes	Stadium: Stadio Comunale; Referee: Orlandini (Rome)

4 November 1951 9	Inter	2–2	Milan	Milan
	Nyers 2'; Lorenzi 9'		5' Burini; 76' Tognon	Stadium: San Siro; Referee: Massai

18 November 1951 10	Inter	5–1	Como	Milan
	Miglioli 9'; Blason 16' (pen.); Broccini 21', 58'; Armano 52'		47' Cattaneo	Stadium: San Siro; Referee: Orlandini

2 December 1951 11	Lucchese	1–0	Inter	Lucca
	Frandsen 13'			Stadium: Stadio Porta Elisa; Referee: Tassini

9 December 1951 12	Inter	3–1	Novara	Milan
	Broccini 30'; Skoglund 37', 89'		41' Rosén	Stadium: San Siro; Referee: Rigato

16 December 1951 13	Udinese	2–1	Inter	Udine
	Rinaldi 2', 71'		77' Armano	Stadium: Stadio Moretti; Referee: Gemini

23 December 1951 14[4]	Inter	suspd	Fiorentina	Milan
				Stadium: San Siro; Referee: De Leo
Note: Match suspended due to heavy fog with a 1–1 score at 61'.

30 December 1951 15	Sampdoria	1–3	Inter	Genoa
	Bassetto 65'		6' (pen.) 17', 51' Nyers	Stadium: Luigi Ferraris; Referee: Agnolin

6 January 1952 16	Juventus	3–2	Inter	Turin
	Praest 24'; Muccinelli 61'; Mari 71'		25' Nyers; 38' Lorenzi	Stadium: Comunale; Referee: Tassini

13 January 1952 17	Inter	4–0	Padova	Milan
	Broccini 43', 54', 79'; Lorenzi 85'			Stadium: San Siro; Referee: Maurelli

20 January 1952 18	Bologna	3–4	Inter	Bologna
	Cervellati 21', 89'; Gritti 58'		7', 86' Nyers; 50' Blason; 80' Lorenzi	Stadium: Stadio Renato Dall'Ara; Referee: Agnolin

27 January 1952 19[5]	Inter	suspd.	Pro Patria	Milan
				Stadium: San Siro; Referee: Rigato
Note: Match suspended due to field issues.

31 January 1952 14[4]	Inter	0–0	Fiorentina	Milan
				Stadium: San Siro; Referee: Piemonte

3 February 1952 20	Triestina	1–3	Inter	Trieste
	Ciccarelli 27'		53' Lorenzi; 59' Nyers; 77' Broccini	Stadium: Stadio Giuseppe Grezar; Referee: Orlandini

20 February 1952 21	Inter	5–0	Palermo	Milan
	Armano 13', 33'; Nyers 41'; Broccini 65', 73'			Stadium: Stadio San Siro; Referee: De Leo

17 February 1952 22	Atalanta	0–2	Inter	Bergamo
			22' Lorenzi; 42' Nyers	Stadium: Comunale; Referee: Massai

24 February 1952 23	Inter	1–1	Lazio	Milan
	Lorenzi 69'		50' Löfgren	Stadium: Stadio San Siro; Referee: Massai

9 March 1952 24	Torino	1–0	Inter	Turin
	Pratesi 7'			Stadium: Stadio Filadelfia; Referee: Orlandini

16 March 1952 25	Inter	3–0	SSC Napoli	Milan
	Nyers 2', 13'; Skoglund 62'			Stadium: San Siro; Referee: Agnolin

19 March 1952 19[5]	Inter	3–0	Pro Patria	Milan
	Wilkes 55'; Broccini 74'; Armano 88'			Stadium: San Siro; Referee: Rigato

23 March 1952 26[6]	Legnano	0–4	Inter	Como
			30' Skoglund; 50' Giacomazzi; 58' Nyers; 87' Wilkes	Stadium: Stadio Giuseppe Sinigaglia; Referee: Piemonte

30 March 1952 27	Inter	1–0	SPAL	Milan
	Nyers 9' (pen.)			Stadium: Stadio San Siro; Referee: De Leo (Mestre)

6 April 1952 28	AC Milan	2–1	Inter	Milan
	Liedholm 54'; Nordahl 75'		58' Nyers	Stadium: San Siro; Referee: Massai

13 April 1952 29	Como	2–1	Inter	Como
	Baldini 23'; Cattaneo 49'		27' (o.g.) Quadri	Stadium: Stadio Giuseppe Sinigaglia; Referee: Bernardi

20 April 1952 30	Inter	4–3	Lucchese	Milan
	Savioni 40'; Armano 49'; Miglioli 53'; Broccini 57'		5' Parodi; 59' Lucchesi; 81' Frandsen	Stadium: San Siro; Referee: Piemonte

27 April 1952 31	Novara	2–4	Inter	Novara
	Janda 77'; Alberico 78'		7', 18' Armano; 17' Wilkes; 49' Broccini	Stadium: Comunale; Referee: Agnolin

4 May 1952 32	Inter	1–1	Udinese	Milan
	Lorenzi 63'		59' Pløger	Stadium: San Siro; Referee: Canavesio

11 May 1952 33	Fiorentina	5–0	Inter	Florence
	Pandolfini 10', 88'; Roosenburg 50'; Lefter 52'; Vitali 67'			Stadium: Comunale; Referee: Silvano

18 May 1952 34	Inter	0–1	Sampdoria	Milan
			32' Bassetto	Stadium: San Siro; Referee: Massai

1 June 1952 35	Inter	3–2	Juventus	Milan
	Broccini 13'; Armano 33'; Lorenzi 64'		69' Boniperti; 75' Hansen	Stadium: San Siro; Referee: Agnolin

8 June 1952 36	Padova	1–5	Inter	Padua
	Martegani 61'		15', 81' Blason; 33' (o.g.) Ganzer; 50' Armano; 64' Miglioli	Stadium: Stadio Silvio Appiani; Referee: Corallo

15 June 1952 37	Inter	2–2	Bologna	Milan
	Lorenzi 30'; Wilkes 82'		19' Cappello; 24' Campatelli	Stadium: San Siro; Referee: Gemini

22 June 1952 38	Pro Patria	5–1	Inter	Busto Arsizio
	Toros 50', 54'; Mannucci 65', 89'; Guarnieri 72'		24' Lorenzi	Stadium: Comunale; Referee: Fortina

== Statistics ==
=== Players statistics ===
No.	Pos	Nat	Player	Total		1951-52 Serie A	
No.	Pos	Nat	Player	Apps	Goals	Apps	Goals
	GK	(Italy) ITA	Livio Puccioni	20	-24	20	-24
	DF	(Italy) ITA	Giovanni Giacomazzi	25	1	25	1
	DF	(Italy) ITA	Attilio Giovannini	33	0	33	0
	DF	(Italy) ITA	Ivano Blason	31	4	31	4
	MF	(Italy) ITA	Pietro Broccini	25	13	25	13
	MF	(Italy) ITA	Osvaldo Fattori	34	0	34	0
	MF	(Italy) ITA	Maino Neri	30	0	30	0
	MF	(Sweden) SWE	Lennart Skoglund	26	5	26	5
	FW	(Italy) ITA	Benito Lorenzi	32	15	32	15
	FW	(Italy) ITA	Gino Armano	37	11	37	11
	FW	(Hungary) HUN	István Nyers	29	23	29	23
	GK	(Italy) ITA	Giorgio Ghezzi	18	-25	18	-25
	DF	(Italy) ITA	Bruno Padulazzi	24	0	24	0
	MF	(Netherlands) NED	Faas Wilkes	23	7	23	7
	DF	(Italy) ITA	Renato Miglioli	20	3	20	3
	MF	(Italy) ITA	Giovanni Invernizzi	4	0	4	0
	MF	(Italy) ITA	Giovanni Migliorini	1	0	1	0
	FW	(Italy) ITA	Marco Savioni	6	1	6	1

- Source: http://calcio-seriea.net/presenze/1952/359/
