= 1950–51 Inter Milan season =

Football Club Internazionale
1950-51 season
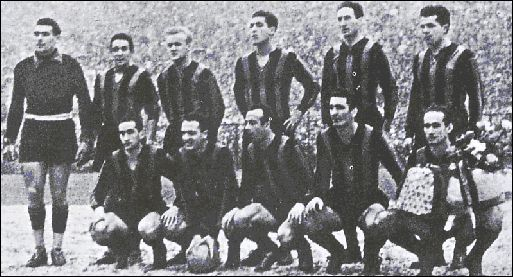
- President: Carlo Masseroni
- Manager: Giulio Cappelli (1ª-8ª); Aldo Olivieri
- Stadium: Stadio San Siro
- Serie A: 2nd
- Top goalscorer: Nyers (31)
Home colours

During the 1950–51 season Football Club Internazionale competed in Serie A.

== Summary ==
Aldo Olivieri took for him the job of Giulio Cappelli as manager in round eight of the championship. President Masseroni bought defenders Ivano Blason from Triestina and Bruno Padulazzi from Lucchese, being signed too Lennart Skoglund. Arrival of the Swedish player in addition to the attacking line up with Nyers, Lorenzi and topscorer Wilkes, diminished chances of play for striker Amadei whom was transferred out to SSC Napoli. Helped by an amazing campaign with 107 goals scored, the squad competed for the trophy with AC Milan losing, unexpectedly, the last two away matches of the season. Inter did not manage to surpass its city rivals on the table and lost the league trophy by one single point.

== Squad ==
Note: Flags indicate national team as defined under FIFA eligibility rules; some limited exceptions apply. Players may hold more than one non-FIFA nationality.

Pos.	Nation	Player
GK	ITA	Narciso Soldan
GK	ITA	Angelo Franzosi
GK	ITA	Livio Puccioni
DF	ITA	Giovanni Giacomazzi
DF	ITA	Ivano Blason
DF	ITA	Bruno Padulazzi
DF	ITA	Renato Miglioli
DF	ITA	Attilio Giovannini
DF	ITA	Angelo Ruffinoni
MF	SWE	Lennart Skoglund

Pos.	Nation	Player
MF	NED	Faas Wilkes
MF	ITA	Osvaldo Fattori
MF	ITA	Camillo Achilli
MF	ITA	Enzo Bearzot
MF	ITA	Piero Pozzi
MF	ITA	Licio Rossetti
FW	ITA	Benito Lorenzi
FW	ITA	Gino Armano
FW	HUN	István Nyers
FW	ITA	Nereo Manzardo

== Competitions ==
=== Serie A ===
==== League table ====
Pos	Team	Pld	W	D	L	GF	GA	GD	Pts	Qualification or relegation
1	Milan (C)	38	26	8	4	107	39	+68	60	1951 Latin Cup
2	Internazionale	38	27	5	6	107	43	+64	59	
3	Juventus	38	23	8	7	103	44	+59	54	
4	Lazio	38	18	10	10	64	50	+14	46	
5	Fiorentina	38	18	8	12	52	42	+10	44	

Source: Panini
(C) Champions

==== Matches ====
10 September 1950 1	Lazio	3–3	Inter Milan	Rome
	Puccinelli 72', 87'; Sentimenti III 81'	Report	14' Nyers; 28', 41' Lorenzi	Stadium: Stadio Nazionale; Referee: Giovanni Galeati

17 September 1950 2	Inter Milan	4–2	Como	Milan
	Wilkes 17'; Lorenzi 38', 86'; Miglioli 79'	Report	29' Lipizer; 33' Meroni	Stadium: Stadio San Siro; Referee: Florindo Longagnani

24 September 1950 3	Padova	2–3	Inter Milan	Padua
	Curti 31', 65'	Report	43' Wilkes; 62' Lorenzi; 69' Miglioli	Stadium: Stadio Silvio Appiani; Referee: Vincenzo Orlandini

1 October 1950 4	Inter Milan	2–0	Triestina	Milan
	Lorenzi 25'; Nyers 32'	Report		Stadium: Stadio San Siro; Referee: Generoso Dattilo

8 October 1950 5	Inter Milan	4–3	Napoli	Milan
	Rossetti 1'; Lorenzi 10', 73'; Wilkes 20'	Report	35', 80' Bacchetti; 37' Masoni	Stadium: Stadio San Siro; Referee: Francesco Liverani

15 October 1950 6	Pro Patria	2–0	Inter Milan	Busto Arsizio
	Martini 19'; Vinyei 55'	Report		Stadium: Stadio Comunale; Referee: Ferruccio Bellè

22 October 1950 7	Inter Milan	6–0	Roma	Milan
	Nyers 1', 69', 77'; Wilkes 9', 81'; Armano 85'	Report		Stadium: Stadio San Siro; Referee: Agostino Gamba

29 October 1950 8	Udinese	1–3	Inter Milan	Udine
	Sørensen 33'	Report	17' Miglioli; 72', 79' Wilkes	Stadium: Stadio Moretti; Referee: Renzo Massai

5 November 1950 9	Inter Milan	5–1	Sampdoria	Milan
	Armano 55'; Wilkes 62', 82', 88'; Lorenzi 66'	Report	15' Sabbatella	Stadium: Stadio San Siro; Referee: Aldo Cartei

12 November 1950 10	AC Milan	2–3	Inter Milan	Milan
	Nordahl 64', 76'	Report	4' Nyers; 28', 83' Skoglund	Stadium: Stadio San Siro; Referee: Giovanni Galeati

19 November 1950 11	Inter Milan	3–1	Palermo	Milan
	Lorenzi 3'; Wilkes 70'; Skoglund 75'	Report	38' Şükrü	Stadium: Stadio San Siro; Referee: Iginio Rigato

26 November 1950 12	Fiorentina	1–2	Inter Milan	Florence
	Vitali 71'	Report	2' Wilkes; 75' Nyers	Stadium: Stadio Comunale; Referee: Vincenzo Orlandini

3 December 1950 13	Inter Milan	3–0	Juventus	Milan
	Nyers 31', 72'; Wilkes 42'	Report		Stadium: Stadio San Siro; Referee: Ferruccio Bellè

10 December 1950 14	Atalanta	3–3	Inter Milan	Bergamo
	Sørensen 44', 85'; Blason 61' (o.g.)	Report	17', 66' Wilkes; 23' Nyers	Stadium: Stadio Comunale; Referee: Generoso Dattilo

17 December 1950 15	Bologna	1–1	Inter Milan	Bologna
	Cervellati 15'	Report	60' Nyers	Stadium: Stadio Renato Dall'Ara; Referee: Agostino Gamba

24 December 1950 16	Inter Milan	2–1	Lucchese	Milan
	Skoglund 16'; Armano 55'	Report	30' (o.g.) Giovannini	Stadium: Stadio San Siro; Referee: Iginio Rigato

31 December 1950 17	Novara	0–1	Inter Milan	Novara
		Report	71' Armano	Stadium: Stadio Enrico Patti; Referee: Giovanni Galeati

7 January 1951 18	Inter Milan	3–1	Torino	Milan
	Nyers 18' (pen.); Lorenzi 33', 70'	Report	19' Carapellese	Stadium: Stadio San Siro; Referee: Giorgio Bernardi

14 January 1951 19	Genoa	2–2	Inter Milan	Genoa
	Mellberg 51'; Nilsson 65'	Report	15' Armano; 72' Wilkes	Stadium: Stadio Luigi Ferraris; Referee: Ferruccio Bellè

21 January 1951 20	Inter Milan	0–0	Lazio	Milan
		Report		Stadium: Stadio San Siro; Referee: Agostino Gamba

28 January 1951 21	Como	3–1	Inter Milan	Como
	Pedroni 21'; Ghiandi 67'; Turconi II 71'	Report	9' (o.g.) Travia	Stadium: Stadio Giuseppe Sinigaglia; Referee: Vincenzo Orlandini

4 February 1951 22	Inter Milan	5–1	Padova	Milan
	Nyers 25', 32'; Lorenzi 59', 71'; Wilkes 80'	Report	6' Martegani	Stadium: Stadio San Siro; Referee: Aldo Cartei

11 February 1951 23	Triestina	2–1	Inter Milan	Trieste
	Boscolo 43', 87'	Report	37' Lorenzi	Stadium: Stadio Giuseppe Grezar; Referee: Renzo Massai

18 February 1951 24	Napoli	0–4	Inter Milan	Naples
		Report	50', 87', 89' Nyers; 77' Wilkes	Stadium: Stadio del Vomero; Referee: Giorgio Bernardi

25 February 1951 25	Inter Milan	6–0	Pro Patria	Milan
	Lorenzi 17', 75'; Rossetti 23'; Nyers 34', 66', 84' (pen.)	Report		Stadium: Stadio San Siro; Referee: Bruno Tassini

4 March 1951 26	Roma	0–1	Inter Milan	Rome
		Report	77' (o.g.) Nordahl	Stadium: Stadio Nazionale; Referee: Renzo Massai

11 March 1951 27	Inter Milan	6–1	Udinese	Milan
	Nyers 25', 38', 74' (pen.); Wilkes 31'; Rossetti 50'; Lorenzi 82'	Report	61' Paulinich	Stadium: Stadio San Siro; Referee: Aldo Cartei

18 March 1951 28	Sampdoria	0–4	Inter Milan	Genoa
		Report	9' Nyers; 29', 35' Skoglund; 78' Armano	Stadium: Stadio Luigi Ferraris; Referee: Gamba

25 March 1951 29	Inter Milan	0–1	AC Milan	Milan
		Report	9' Nordahl	Stadium: Stadio San Siro; Referee: Giovanni Galeati

1 April 1951 30	Palermo	0–3	Inter Milan	Palermo
		Report	5' Achilli; 56', 79' Nyers	Stadium: Stadio La Favorita; Referee: Generoso Dattilo

8 April 1951 31	Inter Milan	2–0	Fiorentina	Milan
	Lorenzi 34'; Armano 73'	Report		Stadium: Stadio San Siro; Referee: Vincenzo Orlandini

22 April 1951 32	Juventus	0–2	Inter Milan	Turin
		Report	67', 82' (pen.) Nyers	Stadium: Stadio Comunale; Referee: Generoso Dattilo

29 April 1951 33	Inter Milan	3–1	Atalanta	Milan
	Pozzi 10'; Wilkes 44'; Lorenzi 61'	Report	44' Hansen	Stadium: Stadio San Siro; Referee: Luigi Gemini

13 May 1951 34	Inter Milan	3–1	Bologna	Milan
	Nyers 5', 88'; Miglioli 76'	Report	55' Tacconi	Stadium: Stadio San Siro; Referee: Vincenzo Orlandini

20 May 1951 35	Lucchese	3–2	Inter Milan	Lucca
	Mike 17' (pen.) 72' (pen.); Giacomazzi 43' (o.g.)	Report	8' Lorenzi; 84' Skoglund	Stadium: Stadio Porta Elisa; Referee: Giovanni Galeati

27 May 1951 36	Inter Milan	5–0	Novara	Milan
	Wilkes 15'; Skoglund 34', 89'; Nyers 78'; Blason 84'	Report		Stadium: Stadio San Siro; Referee: Bruno Tassini

10 June 1951 37	Torino	2–1	Inter Milan	Turin
	Motta 19'; Pløger 46'	Report	57' Pozzi	Stadium: Stadio Filadelfia; Referee: Florindo Longagnani

17 June 1951 38	Inter Milan	5–2	Genoa	Milan
	Wilkes 9', 67'; Skoglund 12', 35', 84'	Report	31', 59' Mellberg	Stadium: Stadio San Siro; Referee: Francesco Liverani

== Statistics ==
=== Players statistics ===
No.	Pos	Nat	Player	Total		1950-51 Serie A	
No.	Pos	Nat	Player	Apps	Goals	Apps	Goals
	GK	(Italy) ITA	Soldan	21	-27	21	-27
	DF	(Italy) ITA	Giacomazzi	23	0	23	0
	DF	(Italy) ITA	Blason	28	1	28	1
	DF	(Italy) ITA	Miglioli	28	4	28	4
	DF	(Italy) ITA	Giovannini	36	0	36	0
	MF	(Sweden) SWE	Skoglund	29	12	29	12
	MF	(Netherlands) NED	Wilkes	38	23	38	23
	MF	(Italy) ITA	Achilli	34	1	34	1
	FW	(Italy) ITA	Lorenzi	37	21	37	21
	FW	(Italy) ITA	Armano	32	7	32	7
	FW	(Hungary) HUN	Nyers	36	31	36	31
	GK	(Italy) ITA	Franzosi	14	-12	14	-12
	GK	(Italy) ITA	Puccioni	3	-4	3	-4
	DF	(Italy) ITA	Padulazzi	21	0	21	0
	DF	(Italy) ITA	Ruffinoni	0	0	0	0
	MF	(Italy) ITA	Fattori	2	0	2	0
	MF	(Italy) ITA	Bearzot	9	0	9	0
	MF	(Italy) ITA	Pozzi	14	2	14	2
	MF	(Italy) ITA	Rossetti	11	3	11	3
	FW	(Italy) ITA	Manzardo	2	0	2	0

- Source: http://calcio-seriea.net/presenze/1950/323/

== Bibliography ==
- Federico Pistone (2008). Inter 1908-2008: un secolo di passione nerazzurra, 2008. Prodotto Ufficiale F.C. Internazionale 1908. p. 536. ISBN 978-88-89370-13-1.
