= 2006 in association football =

The following are the football (soccer) events of the year 2006 throughout the world.

== Events ==
- January 1 – Australia officially left the OFC and joined the AFC.
- January 3 – Antonio Cassano left Roma and joined Real Madrid. He debuted for the merengues on January 18, in a Copa del Rey match against Real Betis, and scored his first goal just three minutes after he came in during the second half.
- January 4 – Robert Maaskant returns at Dutch club RBC Roosendaal as their new coach.
- January 27 – Euro 2008 qualifying group assignments announced.
- February 1 – Rini Coolen resigns as manager of Dutch club FC Twente.
- February 2 – South Korean club Bucheon FC moved to Jeju Island and changed their name to Jeju United FC.
- February 8 – Turkey are banned from staging their six home qualifying matches for Euro 2008 in Turkey due to incidents during their 2006 World Cup qualification match against Switzerland, which finished 4–2 on November 16, 2005.
- March 5 – Sydney FC are crowned Australian champions in the first season of the revamped national league (the A-League)
- April 5 – Celtic win the Scottish Premier League.
- April 9 – Netherlands Eredivisie: PSV Eindhoven won its second consecutive title, their nineteenth in total.
- April 16 – Lyon clinch their fifth consecutive Ligue 1 title with a 1–0 victory at Paris Saint-Germain.
- April 22 – Alan Shearer announces his retirement from football, three weeks earlier than planned, the cause of his early decision being a niggling knee injury.
- April 29 – Chelsea win second Premiership title in a row.
- April 30 – Starting the largest match fixing scandal in the history of Italian Serie A football. On May 14, Juventus clinch 29th Italian title.
- May 13 – Bayern Munich win second Bundesliga title in a row.
- May 14 – Anderlecht wins the Belgian First Division, their twenty-eighth in total.
- May 17 – FC Barcelona beat Arsenal 2–1 in the Champions League Final.
- June 3 – The 2006 FIFI Wild Cup final game, Turkish Republic of Northern Cyprus vs. Zanzibar. Turkish Republic of Northern Cyprus won the game 4–1 in a penalty shootout, winning their first title.
- June 9 – The 2006 World Cup finals kick off, as Germany beat Costa Rica 4–2.
- June 21 – Midfielder Philip Cocu plays his 100th international match for the Netherlands, when Holland draws with Argentina (0-0) at the 2006 FIFA World Cup.
- July 9 – 2006 World Cup final game, Italy vs. France. Italy won the game 5–3 in a penalty shootout, winning their fourth title.
- August 16 – CONMEBOL Copa Libertadores final game, Internacional vs. São Paulo. Internacional won the cup after the draw in 2–2 in the second game. In first game, Internacional won by 2–1.
- September 14 – Recopa Sudamericana 2006 return match, Boca Juniors wins its 16th international title against São Paulo, breaking the world record on number of international club titles.

== International tournaments ==
- 2006 African Cup of Nations (January 20 – February 10)
  1. Egypt
  2. Ivory Coast
  3. Nigeria
  4. Senegal
- 2006 FIFI Wild Cup (May 29 – June 3)
  1. Northern Cyprus
  2. Zanzibar
  3. Republic of St. Pauli
  4. Gibraltar
- 2006 FIFA World Cup (June 9 – July 9)
  1. Italy
  2. France
  3. Germany
  4. Portugal

== National champions ==
=== UEFA nations ===
- Albania: KS Elbasani
- Andorra: FC Rànger's
- Armenia: FC Pyunik
- Austria: Austria Wien
- Azerbaijan: FK Baku
- Belarus: BATE Borisov
- Belgium: RSC Anderlecht
- Bosnia and Herzegovina: NK Široki Brijeg
- Bulgaria: Levski Sofia
- Croatia: Dinamo Zagreb
- Cyprus: Apollon Limassol
- Czech Republic: Slovan Liberec
- Denmark: Copenhagen
- England: Chelsea
- Estonia: FC Levadia
- Faroe Islands: HB Torshavn
- Finland: Tampere United
- France: Lyon
- Georgia: Sioni Bolnisi
- Germany: Bayern Munich
- Greece: Olympiacos
- Hungary: Debrecen
- Iceland: FH Hafnarfjörður
- Ireland: Shelbourne
- Israel: Maccabi Haifa
- Italy: Internazionale (Juventus stripped of title)
- Kazakhstan: FC Astana
- Latvia: FK Ventspils
- Liechtenstein: FC Vaduz
- Lithuania: FBK Kaunas
- Luxembourg: F91 Dudelange
- Macedonia: FK Pobeda
- Malta: Birkirkara FC
- Moldova: FC Sheriff Tiraspol
- Netherlands: PSV
- Northern Ireland: Linfield
- Norway: Rosenborg
- Poland: Legia Warsaw
- Portugal: Porto
- Romania: Steaua București
- Russia: CSKA Moscow
- San Marino: SS Murata
- Scotland: Celtic
- Serbia and Montenegro: Red Star Belgrade
- Slovakia: MFK Ruzomberok
- Slovenia: ND Gorica
- Spain: FC Barcelona
- Sweden: IF Elfsborg
- Switzerland: FC Zürich
- Turkey: Galatasaray
- Ukraine: Shaktar Donetsk
- Wales: Total Network Solutions

=== CONMEBOL nations ===
A = Apertura, C = Clausura

- Argentina: Boca Juniors (C), Estudiantes La Plata (A)
- Bolivia: Club Bolivar (C), Wilstermann (A)
- Brazil: São Paulo
- Chile: Colo Colo (A &C)
- Colombia: Deportivo Pasto (I), Cúcuta Deportivo (II)
- Ecuador: El Nacional
- Paraguay: Club Libertad
- Peru: Alianza Lima
- Uruguay: Nacional Montevideo
- Venezuela: Caracas FC

=== CONCACAF nations ===
A = Apertura, C = Clausura

- Canada: Italia Shooters (CSL)
- Costa Rica: Deportivo Saprissa
- HON: Olimpia (C), Motagua (A)
- El Salvador: C.D. FAS (A), C.D. Águila (C)
- Jamaica: Waterhouse F.C.
- Mexico: Chivas de Guadalajara (A), Pachuca (C)
- Panama: San Francisco F.C.
- Trinidad and Tobago: Joe Public F.C.
- United States: Houston Dynamo (MLS)

=== CAF nations ===
- Cameroon: Cotonsport Garoua
- Ivory Coast: ASEC Mimosas
- Egypt: Ahly Sporting Club
- Libya: Al Ittihad Tripoli
- Morocco: Wydad Casablanca
- Nigeria: Ocean Boys FC
- South Africa: Mamelodi Sundowns
- Sudan: Al-Hilal
- Tunisia: Espérance

=== AFC nations ===
- Australia: Sydney FC
- China: Shandong Luneng
- Hong Kong: Happy Valley
- India: Mahindra United
- Indonesia: Persik Kediri
- Iraq: Al Zawraa
- Iran: Esteghlal FC
- Japan: Urawa Red Diamonds
- Lebanon: Al-Ansar
- Malaysia: Negeri Sembilan FA
- Qatar: Al-Sadd
- Saudi Arabia: Al-Shabab
- Singapore: SAFFC
- South Korea: Seongnam Ilhwa Chunma
- Syria: Al-Karamah
- Thailand: Bangkok University FC
- United Arab Emirates: Al-Ahli
- Uzbekistan: FK Pakhtakor
- Vietnam: Đồng Tâm Long An

== International club tournaments ==
- FIFA Club World Cup – (Brazil) Sport Club Internacional
- UEFA Champions League – (Spain) FC Barcelona
- UEFA Cup – (Spain) Sevilla
- CONCACAF Champions' Cup – (Mexico) Club América
- CONMEBOL Copa Libertadores – (Brazil) Sport Club Internacional
- CONMEBOL Sudamericana Cup – (Mexico) Pachuca
- CONMEBOL Recopa Sudamericana – (Argentina) Boca Juniors
- CAF Champions League – (Egypt) Al Ahly SC
- CAF Confederation Cup – (Tunisia) Étoile du Sahel
- AFC Champions League – (South Korea) Jeonbuk Hyundai Motors
- AFC Cup – (Jordan) Al-Faisaly
- OFC Champions League – (New Zealand) Auckland City FC

== Movies ==
- Zidane, un portrait du 21e siècle (France)
- Deutschland. Ein Sommermärchen (Germany)
- Once in a Lifetime (US)

== Deaths ==
=== January ===
- January 7 – Gábor Zavadszky (31), Hungarian footballer
- January 8 – Elson Becerra (27), Colombian footballer
- January 9 – Gerrie Kleton (52), Dutch footballer
- January 13 – Peter Rösch (75), Swiss footballer
- January 14 – Mark Philo (21), English footballer

=== February ===
- February 4 – Jenő Dalnoki (74), Hungarian footballer
- February 8 – Ron Greenwood (84), English footballer and manager
- February 9 – André Strappe (77), French footballer
- February 13 – Joseph Ujlaki (76), French footballer
- February 17 – Jorge Pinto Mendonça (51), Brazilian footballer
- February 23 – Telmo Zarraonaindía (85), Spanish footballer
- February 25 – Charlie Wayman (83), English footballer
- February 27 – Ferenc Bene (61), Hungarian footballer

=== March ===
- March 1 – Peter Osgood (59), English footballer
- March 6 – Roman Ogaza (54), Polish footballer
- March 12 – Jimmy Johnstone (61), Scottish footballer
- March 13 – Roy Clarke (80), Welsh footballer
- March 26 – Ole Madsen (71), Danish footballer

=== April ===
- April 16 – Georges Stuber (80), Swiss footballer
- April 18 – John Lyall (66), English manager
- April 21 – Telê Santana (74), Brazilian manager
- April 25 – Brian Labone (66), English footballer

=== May ===
- May 2 – Luigi Griffanti (89), Italian footballer
- May 23 – Kazimierz Górski (85), Polish manager

=== June ===
- June 9 – Shay Gibbons (77), Irish footballer
- June 24 – Jean Varraud (87), French footballer and scout

=== July ===
- July 21 – Bert Slater (70), Scottish footballer
- July 31 – Pascal Miézan (47), Ivorian footballer

=== August ===
- August 1 – Ferenc Szusza (82), Hungarian footballer
- August 15 – Faas Wilkes (82), Dutch footballer
- August 19 – Óscar Míguez (78), Uruguayan striker, winner of the 1950 FIFA World Cup and Uruguay's all-time record World Cup goalscorer with eight goals.
- August 24 – Mokhtar Ben Nacef (80), Tunisian footballer
- August 31 – Mohamed Abdelwahab (23), Egyptian footballer

=== September ===
- September 2 – Pietro Broccini (78), Italian footballer
- September 4 – Giacinto Facchetti (64), Italian footballer

=== October ===
- October 17 – Lieuwe Steiger (82), Dutch footballer

=== November ===
- November 3 – Alberto Spencer (68), Ecuadorian footballer
- November 4 – Sergi López Segú (39), Spanish footballer
- November 5 – Pietro Rava, Italian defender, oldest surviving winner of the 1938 FIFA World Cup.(90)
- November 17 – Ferenc Puskás (79), Hungarian footballer and manager
- November 28 – Max Merkel (87), Austrian footballer and manager

=== December ===
- December 5 – Gernot Jurtin (51), Austrian footballer
- December 15 – Alessio Ferramosca and Riccardo Neri (17), Italian footballers
- December 31 – Ya'akov Hodorov (79), Israeli footballer
