= Travia =

Travia is an Italian surname. Notable people with the surname include:

- Alfredo Travia (1924–2000), Italian footballer
- Anthony J. Travia (1911–1993), American lawyer, politician, and judge
