= Ekholm =

Ekholm is a Swedish surname. Notable people with the surname include:

- Berndt Ekholm (born 1944), Swedish Social Democratic politician
- Börje Ekholm (born 1963), Swedish business executive
- Helena Ekholm (born 1984), Swedish biathlete
- Jan Ekholm (born 1969), Swedish football player
- Jan-Olof Ekholm (1931–2020), Swedish detective fiction writer
- Kaarlo Ekholm (1884–1946), Finnish gymnast
- Mattias Ekholm (born 1990), Swedish ice hockey player
- Nancy Ekholm Burkert (born 1933), American artist and illustrator
- Nils Gustaf Ekholm (1848–1923), Swedish meteorologist
