= Tomasiewicz =

Tomasiewicz is a Polish surame. Notable people with the surname include:

- Grzegorz Tomasiewicz (born 1996), Polish footballer
- Wojciech Tomasiewicz, Polish footballer
