= Brian Tevreden =

Brian Tevreden may refer to:

- Brian Tevreden (footballer, born 1981), Dutch footballer
- Brian Tevreden (footballer, born 1969), Dutch footballer
