= 2006–07 Football League =

108th season of the Football League

The Football League
- Season: 2006–07
- Champions: Sunderland
- Promoted: Sunderland; Birmingham City; Derby County
- Relegated: Boston United; Torquay United
- New clubs in league: Accrington Stanley; Hereford United

The 2006–07 Football League (known as the Coca-Cola Football League for sponsorship reasons) was the 108th completed season of The Football League.

The Football League was contested through three Divisions in England and Wales. The divisions were the Football League Championship, Football League One and Football League Two. The winner and the runner-up of the Championship were automatically promoted to the Premier League and they were joined by the winner of the Championship play-offs. The bottom two teams in League Two were relegated to the Conference Premier.

== Promotion and relegation from 2005–06 ==
=== Promoted from Conference National ===
- Accrington Stanley (champions)
- Hereford United (playoff winners)

=== Relegated from the Premier League ===
- Birmingham City (18th)
- West Bromwich Albion (19th)
- Sunderland (20th)

== Final league tables and results ==
The tables below are reproduced here in the exact form that they can be found at The Rec.Sport.Soccer Statistics Foundation website, with home and away statistics separated. Play-off results are from the same website.

== Championship ==
Football League Championship
- Season: 2006–07
- Champions: Sunderland (5th second tier title)
- Direct promotion to FA Premier League: Sunderland, Birmingham City
- Promoted to FA Premier League through play-offs: Derby County
- Relegated: Leeds United, Luton Town, Southend United
- Matches: 552
- Goals: 1,439 (2.61 per match)
- Top goalscorer: Jamie Cureton (Colchester United), 23

Pos	Team	Pld	W	D	L	GF	GA	GD	Pts	Promotion, qualification or relegation
1	Sunderland (C, P)	46	27	7	12	76	47	+29	88	Promotion to the Premier League
2	Birmingham City (P)	46	26	8	12	67	42	+25	86	Promotion to the Premier League
3	Derby County (O, P)	46	25	9	12	62	46	+16	84	Qualification for Championship play-offs
4	West Bromwich Albion	46	22	10	14	81	55	+26	76	Qualification for Championship play-offs
5	Wolverhampton Wanderers	46	22	10	14	59	56	+3	76	Qualification for Championship play-offs
6	Southampton	46	21	12	13	77	53	+24	75	Qualification for Championship play-offs
7	Preston North End	46	22	8	16	64	53	+11	74	
8	Stoke City	46	19	16	11	62	41	+21	73	
9	Sheffield Wednesday	46	20	11	15	70	66	+4	71	
10	Colchester United	46	20	9	17	70	56	+14	69	
11	Plymouth Argyle	46	17	16	13	63	62	+1	67	
12	Crystal Palace	46	18	11	17	59	51	+8	65	
13	Cardiff City	46	17	13	16	57	53	+4	64	
14	Ipswich Town	46	18	8	20	64	59	+5	62	
15	Burnley	46	15	12	19	52	49	+3	57	
16	Norwich City	46	16	9	21	56	71	−15	57	
17	Coventry City	46	16	8	22	47	62	−15	56	
18	Queens Park Rangers	46	14	11	21	54	68	−14	53	
19	Leicester City	46	13	14	19	49	64	−15	53	
20	Barnsley	46	15	5	26	53	85	−32	50	
21	Hull City	46	13	10	23	51	67	−16	49	
22	Southend United (R)	46	10	12	24	47	80	−33	42	Relegation to Football League One
23	Luton Town (R)	46	10	10	26	53	81	−28	40	Relegation to Football League One
24	Leeds United (R)	46	13	7	26	46	72	−26	36 (Note: Leeds United had 10 points deducted for entering financial administration.)	Relegation to Football League One

Source: RSSSF
Rules for classification: In the Football League goals scored (F) takes precedence over goal difference (GD).
(C) Champions; (O) Play-off winners; (P) Promoted; (R) Relegated
Notes:
Locations of the Football League Championship 2006–2007 teams

=== Play-offs ===
Semifinals; 1st leg – 12/13 May; 2nd leg – 15/16 May 2007
3rd	Derby County (pen.)	2	2	4 (4)
6th	Southampton	1	3	4 (3)
4th	West Bromwich Albion	3	1	4
5th	Wolverhampton Wanderers	2	0	2

Final at Wembley Stadium; 28 May 2007
3rd	Derby County	1
4th	West Bromwich Albion	0

=== Top scorers ===
Rank	Player	Club	Goals
1	(England) Jamie Cureton	Colchester United	23
2	(England) Michael Chopra	Cardiff City	22
3	(Senegal) Diomansy Kamara	West Bromwich Albion	21
4	(Wales) Robert Earnshaw	Norwich City	19
5	(Scotland) Chris Iwelumo	Colchester United	18
=	(Poland) Grzegorz Rasiak	Southampton	18
7	(Scotland) Steve Howard	Derby County	16
=	(Republic of Ireland) Alan Lee	Ipswich Town	16
=	(England) Kevin Phillips	West Bromwich Albion	16
10	(England) David Nugent	Preston North End	15

== League One ==
Football League One
- Season: 2006–07
- Champions: Scunthorpe United (1st third tier title)
- Direct promotion: Scunthorpe United, Bristol City
- Promoted through play-offs: Blackpool
- Relegated: Bradford City, Brentford, Chesterfield, Rotherham United
- Matches: 552
- Goals: 1,386 (2.51 per match)
- Top goalscorer: Billy Sharp (Scunthorpe United), 30
- Highest scoring: Swansea City 3–6 Blackpool (5 May 2007)
- Longest winning run: 7 matches (Blackpool: 31 March – 5 May 2007); Scunthorpe United (27 January – 3 March 2007)
- Longest unbeaten run: 19 matches (Scunthorpe: 22 December 2006 – 5 May 2007)
- Longest losing run: 5 matches (Brentford: 28 October – 5 December 2006 and 21 March – 21 April 2007)
- Highest attendance: 27,875 (Nottingham Forest 1–1 Rotherham United; 9 April 2007)
- Lowest attendance: 3,341 (Chesterfield 0–0 Northampton Town; 6 December 2006)
- Average attendance: 7,490

Pos	Team	Pld	W	D	L	GF	GA	GD	Pts	Promotion, qualification or relegation
1	Scunthorpe United (C, P)	46	26	13	7	73	35	+38	91	Promotion to Football League Championship
2	Bristol City (P)	46	25	10	11	63	39	+24	85	Promotion to Football League Championship
3	Blackpool (O, P)	46	24	11	11	76	49	+27	83	Qualification for League One play-offs
4	Nottingham Forest	46	23	13	10	65	41	+24	82	Qualification for League One play-offs
5	Yeovil Town	46	23	10	13	55	39	+16	79	Qualification for League One play-offs
6	Oldham Athletic	46	21	12	13	69	47	+22	75	Qualification for League One play-offs
7	Swansea City	46	20	12	14	69	53	+16	72	
8	Carlisle United	46	19	11	16	54	55	−1	68	
9	Tranmere Rovers	46	18	13	15	58	53	+5	67	
10	Millwall	46	19	9	18	59	62	−3	66	
11	Doncaster Rovers	46	16	15	15	52	47	+5	63	
12	Port Vale	46	18	6	22	64	65	−1	60	
13	Crewe Alexandra	46	17	9	20	66	72	−6	60	
14	Northampton Town	46	15	14	17	48	51	−3	59	
15	Huddersfield Town	46	14	17	15	60	69	−9	59	
16	Gillingham	46	17	8	21	56	77	−21	59	
17	Cheltenham Town	46	15	9	22	49	61	−12	54	
18	Brighton & Hove Albion	46	14	11	21	49	58	−9	53	
19	Bournemouth	46	13	13	20	50	64	−14	52	
20	Leyton Orient	46	12	15	19	61	77	−16	51	
21	Chesterfield (R)	46	12	11	23	45	53	−8	47	Relegation to Football League Two
22	Bradford City (R)	46	11	14	21	47	65	−18	47	Relegation to Football League Two
23	Rotherham United (R)	46	13	9	24	58	75	−17	38 (Note: Rotherham United had 10 points deducted for entering financial administration.)	Relegation to Football League Two
24	Brentford (R)	46	8	13	25	40	79	−39	37	Relegation to Football League Two

Rules for classification: In the Football League goals scored (GF) takes precedence over goal difference (GD).
(C) Champions; (O) Play-off winners; (P) Promoted; (R) Relegated
Notes:
Locations of the Football League One 2006–2007 teams

=== Play-offs ===
Semifinals; 1st leg – 11/13 May; 2nd leg – 18/19 May 2007
3rd	Blackpool	2	3	5
6th	Oldham Athletic	1	1	2
4th	Nottingham Forest	2	2	4
5th	Yeovil Town (a.e.t.)	0	5	5

Final at Wembley Stadium, London; 27 May 2007
3rd	Blackpool	2
5th	Yeovil Town	0

=== Top scorers ===
Rank	Player	Club	Goals
1	(England) Billy Sharp	Scunthorpe United	30
2	(England) Leon Constantine	Port Vale	22
3	(England) Chris Porter	Oldham	21
4	(England) Lee Trundle	Swansea City	19
5	(England) Chris Greenacre	Tranmere Rovers	17
=	(England) Luke Varney	Crewe Alexandra	17
7	(Jamaica) Darren Byfield	Millwall	16
=	(England) Nicky Maynard	Crewe Alexandra	16
=	(England) Andy Morrell	Blackpool	16
10	(England) Luke Beckett	Huddersfield Town	15
=	(England) Will Hoskins	Rotherham United	15

=== Results ===
Home \ Away	BOU	BLP	BRA	BRE	B&HA	BRI	CRL	CHL	CHF	CRE	DON	GIL	HUD	LEY	MIL	NOR	NOT	OLD	PTV	ROT	SCU	SWA	TRA	YEO
AFC Bournemouth		1–3	1–1	1–0	1–0	0–1	0–1	2–1	0–3	1–0	2–0	1–1	1–2	5–0	1–0	0–0	2–0	3–2	0–4	1–3	1–1	2–2	2–0	0–2
Blackpool	2–0		4–1	1–3	0–0	0–1	2–1	2–1	1–1	2–1	3–1	1–1	3–1	3–0	0–1	4–1	0–2	2–2	2–1	0–1	3–1	1–1	3–2	1–1
Bradford City	0–0	1–3		1–1	2–3	2–1	1–1	2–2	1–0	0–1	0–1	4–2	0–1	0–2	2–2	1–2	2–2	1–1	2–0	1–1	0–1	2–2	2–0	0–2
Brentford	0–0	1–0	2–1		1–0	1–1	0–0	0–2	2–1	0–4	0–4	2–2	2–2	2–2	1–4	0–1	2–4	2–2	4–3	0–1	0–2	0–2	1–1	1–2
Brighton & Hove Albion	2–2	0–3	0–1	2–2		0–2	1–2	2–1	1–2	1–4	0–2	1–0	0–0	4–1	0–1	1–1	2–1	1–2	0–0	0–0	1–1	3–2	0–1	1–3
Bristol City	2–2	2–4	2–3	1–0	1–0		1–0	0–1	3–1	2–1	1–0	3–1	1–1	2–1	1–0	1–0	1–1	0–0	2–1	3–1	1–0	0–0	3–2	2–0
Carlisle United	3–1	2–0	1–0	2–0	3–1	1–3		2–0	0–0	0–2	1–0	5–0	1–1	3–1	1–2	1–1	1–0	1–1	3–2	1–1	0–2	1–2	1–0	1–4
Cheltenham Town	1–0	1–2	1–2	2–0	1–1	2–2	0–1		0–0	1–1	0–2	1–1	2–1	2–1	3–2	0–2	0–2	1–2	0–1	2–0	1–1	2–1	1–0	1–2
Chesterfield	0–1	2–0	3–0	3–1	0–1	1–3	0–0	1–0		2–1	1–1	0–1	0–0	0–1	5–1	0–0	1–2	2–1	3–0	2–1	0–1	2–3	0–2	1–1
Crewe Alexandra	2–0	1–2	0–3	3–1	1–1	0–1	5–1	3–1	2–2		2–1	4–3	2–0	0–4	1–0	2–2	1–4	2–1	2–1	1–0	1–3	1–3	1–1	2–3
Doncaster Rovers	1–1	0–0	3–3	3–0	1–0	0–1	1–2	0–2	1–0	3–1		1–2	3–0	0–0	1–2	2–2	1–0	1–1	1–0	3–2	2–2	2–2	0–0	0–0
Gillingham	1–1	2–2	1–0	2–1	0–1	1–0	2–0	2–1	2–1	1–0	0–2		2–1	2–1	2–1	0–1	0–1	0–3	3–2	1–0	0–2	3–1	2–0	0–2
Huddersfield Town	2–2	0–2	2–0	0–2	0–3	2–1	2–1	2–0	1–1	1–2	0–0	3–1		3–1	4–2	1–1	1–1	0–3	2–2	3–0	1–1	3–2	2–2	2–3
Leyton Orient	3–2	0–1	1–2	1–1	1–4	1–1	1–1	2–0	0–0	1–1	1–1	3–3	1–0		2–0	0–2	1–3	2–2	2–1	2–3	2–2	0–1	3–1	0–0
Millwall	1–0	0–0	2–0	1–1	0–1	1–0	2–0	2–0	2–1	2–2	2–2	4–1	0–0	2–5		0–1	1–0	1–0	1–1	4–0	0–1	2–0	2–2	1–1
Northampton Town	3–1	1–1	0–0	0–1	0–2	1–3	3–2	2–0	1–0	1–2	0–2	1–1	1–1	0–1	3–0		0–1	2–3	0–2	3–0	2–1	1–0	1–3	1–1
Nottingham Forest	3–0	1–1	1–0	2–0	2–1	1–0	0–0	3–0	4–0	0–0	0–1	1–0	5–1	1–3	3–1	1–0		0–2	3–0	1–1	0–4	3–1	1–1	1–0
Oldham Athletic	1–2	0–1	2–0	3–0	1–1	0–3	0–0	0–2	1–0	1–0	4–0	4–1	1–1	3–3	1–2	3–0	5–0		0–1	2–1	1–0	1–0	1–0	1–0
Port Vale	2–1	2–1	0–1	1–0	2–1	0–2	0–2	1–1	3–2	3–0	1–2	2–0	1–2	3–0	2–0	1–0	1–1	3–0		1–3	0–0	0–2	2–3	4–2
Rotherham United	0–2	1–0	4–1	2–0	0–1	1–1	0–1	2–4	0–1	5–1	0–0	3–2	2–3	2–2	2–3	1–2	1–1	2–3	1–5		2–1	1–2	2–1	3–2
Scunthorpe United	3–2	1–3	2–0	1–1	1–2	1–0	3–0	1–0	1–0	2–2	2–0	3–1	2–0	3–1	3–0	1–0	1–1	1–1	3–0	1–0		2–2	1–1	1–0
Swansea City	4–2	3–6	1–0	2–0	2–1	0–0	5–0	1–2	2–0	2–1	2–0	2–0	1–2	0–0	2–0	2–1	0–0	0–1	3–0	1–1	0–2		0–0	1–1
Tranmere Rovers	1–0	2–0	1–1	3–1	2–1	1–0	0–2	2–2	2–0	1–0	1–0	2–3	2–2	3–0	3–1	1–1	0–0	1–0	1–2	2–1	0–2	0–2		2–1
Yeovil Town	0–0	0–1	0–0	1–0	2–0	2–1	2–1	0–1	1–0	2–0	1–0	2–0	3–1	2–1	0–1	0–0	0–1	1–0	1–0	1–0	0–2	1–0	0–2	

Updated to match(es) played on 5 May 2007. Source: English Football
Legend: Blue = home team win; Yellow = draw; Red = away team win.

== League Two ==
Football League Two
- Season: 2006–07
- Champions: Walsall (2nd fourth tier title)
- Direct promotion: Walsall, Hartlepool United, Swindon Town
- Promoted through play-offs: Bristol Rovers
- Relegated to Conference: Boston United, Torquay United
- New clubs in the league: Accrington Stanley, Hereford United
- Matches: 552
- Goals: 1,372 (2.49 per match)
- Top goalscorer: Richard Barker (Hartlepool United), 21; Izale McLeod (Milton Keynes Dons), 21

Pos	Team	Pld	W	D	L	GF	GA	GD	Pts	Promotion, qualification or relegation
1	Walsall (C, P)	46	25	14	7	66	34	+32	89	Promotion to Football League One
2	Hartlepool United (P)	46	26	10	10	65	40	+25	88	Promotion to Football League One
3	Swindon Town (P)	46	25	10	11	58	38	+20	85	Promotion to Football League One
4	Milton Keynes Dons	46	25	9	12	76	58	+18	84	Qualification for League Two play-offs
5	Lincoln City	46	21	11	14	70	59	+11	74	Qualification for League Two play-offs
6	Bristol Rovers (O, P)	46	20	12	14	49	42	+7	72	Qualification for League Two play-offs
7	Shrewsbury Town	46	18	17	11	68	46	+22	71	Qualification for League Two play-offs
8	Stockport County	46	21	8	17	65	54	+11	71	
9	Rochdale	46	18	12	16	70	50	+20	66	
10	Peterborough United	46	18	11	17	70	61	+9	65	
11	Darlington	46	17	14	15	52	56	−4	65	
12	Wycombe Wanderers	46	16	14	16	52	47	+5	62	
13	Notts County	46	16	14	16	55	53	+2	62	
14	Barnet	46	16	11	19	55	70	−15	59	
15	Grimsby Town	46	17	8	21	57	73	−16	59	
16	Hereford United	46	14	13	19	45	53	−8	55	
17	Mansfield Town	46	14	12	20	58	63	−5	54	
18	Chester City	46	13	14	19	40	48	−8	53	
19	Wrexham	46	13	12	21	43	65	−22	51	
20	Accrington Stanley	46	13	11	22	70	81	−11	50	
21	Bury	46	13	11	22	46	61	−15	50	
22	Macclesfield Town	46	12	12	22	55	77	−22	48	
23	Boston United (R)	46	12	10	24	51	80	−29	36 (Note: Boston United had 10 points deducted for entering a Company Voluntary Arrangement. They were relegated directly to the Conference North for not paying their footballing creditors.)	Relegation to Conference North
24	Torquay United (R)	46	7	14	25	36	63	−27	35	Relegation to Football Conference

Rules for classification: In the Football League goals scored (GF) takes precedence over goal difference (GD).
(C) Champions; (O) Play-off winners; (P) Promoted; (R) Relegated
Notes:
Locations of the Football League Two teams 2006–2007

=== Play-offs ===
Semifinals; 1st leg – 12/14 May; 2nd leg – 17/18 May 2007
4th	Milton Keynes Dons	0	1	1
7th	Shrewsbury	0	2	2
5th	Lincoln City	1	3	4
6th	Bristol Rovers	2	5	7

Final at Wembley Stadium; 26 May 2007
6th	Bristol Rovers	3
7th	Shrewsbury	1

=== Top scorers ===
Rank	Player	Club	Goals
1	(England) Richard Barker	Mansfield Town; Hartlepool United	21
=	(England) Izale McLeod	Milton Keynes Dons	21
3	(England) Glenn Murray	Stockport / Rochdale	19
4	(England) Jamie Forrester	Lincoln City	18
=	(England) Clive Platt	Milton Keynes Dons	18
6	(England) Chris Dagnall	Rochdale	17
=	(Wales) Jermaine Easter	Wycombe Wanderers	17
8	(England) Anthony Elding	Boston United; Stockport County	16
=	(England) Mark Stallard	Lincoln City	16
=	(England) Andy Bishop	Bury	16
=	(England) Richard Walker	Bristol Rovers	16

== See also ==
- The Football League
- 2006–07 in English football
- 2006 in association football
- 2007 in association football
