= List of Valencia CF seasons =

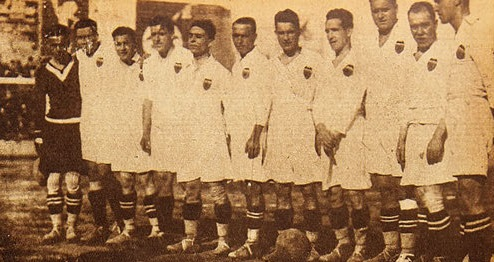
Valencia's team in 1927.

This is a list of seasons played by Valencia CF in Spanish and European football, from 1919 to the most recent completed season. It details the club's achievements in major competitions, and the top scorers for each season.

The club has won the league six times, the Spanish Cup eight times, the Spanish Super Cup one time, the Copa Eva Duarte one time, the UEFA Cup three times, the European Cup Winners' Cup one time, the European Super Cup twice and the Intertoto Cup one time but has never won the UEFA Champions League, finishing runners-up twice.

== Key ==
Key to league record:

- Pos = Final position
- Pld = Matches played
- W = Matches won
- D = Matches drawn
- L = Matches lost
- GF = Goals for
- GA = Goals against
- Pts = Points

Key to rounds:

- W = Winners
- F = Final (Runners-up)
- SF = Semi-finals
- QF = Quarter-finals
- R16 = Round of 16
- R32 = Round of 32
- R64 = Round of 64

- R5 = Fifth round
- R4 = Fourth round
- R3 = Third round
- R2 = Second round
- R1 = First round
- GS = Group stage

Champions	Runners-up	Promoted	Relegated	Pichichi

== Seasons ==
Domestic and international results of Valencia
Season	League									Cup	Europe		Other Comp.		Top scorer(s)	
Season	Division	Pos	Pld	W	D	L	GF	GA	Pts	Cup	Europe		Other Comp.		Player(s)	Goals
1928–29	Segunda División (II)	5th	18	8	3	7	33	31	19	R2					(Spain) Jesús Navarro	10
1929–30	Segunda División (II)	6th	18	7	4	7	40	43	18	QF					(Spain) Juan Costa	23
1930–31	Segunda División (II)	1st	18	12	2	4	37	25	26	QF					(Spain) Juan Costa	18
1931–32	La Liga (I)	7th	18	6	3	9	38	47	15	R2					(Spain) Jesús Navarro	14
1932–33	La Liga (I)	9th	18	4	5	9	34	53	13	SF					(Spain) Jesús Navarro	33
1933–34	La Liga (I)	7th	18	7	3	8	28	38	17	RU					(Spain) José Vilanova	27
1934–35	La Liga (I)	9th	22	9	2	11	40	49	20	R16					(Spain) Juan Costa (Spain) José Vilanova	16
1935–36	La Liga (I)	8th	22	7	5	10	36	42	19	R16					(Spain) 'Lelé' Santiago	14
1936–37	Spanish Civil War															
1937–38	Spanish Civil War															
1938–39	Spanish Civil War															
1939–40	La Liga (I)	8th	22	9	3	10	40	36	21	SF					(Spain) Edmundo Suárez	47
1940–41	La Liga (I)	3rd	22	11	5	6	60	52	27	W					(Spain) Edmundo Suárez	30
1941–42	La Liga (I)	1st	26	18	4	4	85	39	40	SF					(Spain) Edmundo Suárez	34
1942–43	La Liga (I)	7th	26	10	7	9	58	45	27	SF					(Spain) Edmundo Suárez	27
1943–44	La Liga (I)	1st	26	18	4	4	73	32	40	RU					(Spain) Edmundo Suárez	33
1944–45	La Liga (I)	5th	26	12	6	8	61	35	30	RU					(Spain) Edmundo Suárez	27
1945–46	La Liga (I)	6th	26	9	10	7	44	36	28	RU					(Spain) Edmundo Suárez	23
1946–47	La Liga (I)	1st	26	16	2	8	54	34	34	R16					(Spain) Vicente Morera (Spain) Edmundo Suárez	11
1947–48	La Liga (I)	2nd	26	15	4	7	59	34	34	QF			Copa Eva Duarte	RU	(Spain) Silvestre Igoa	17
1948–49	La Liga (I)	2nd	26	16	3	7	78	47	35	W					(Spain) Edmundo Suárez	21
1949–50	La Liga (I)	3rd	26	12	7	7	71	43	31	SF			Copa Eva Duarte	W	(Spain) Silvestre Igoa	27
1950–51	La Liga (I)	3rd	30	17	3	10	64	48	37	R16					(Spain) Manuel Badenes	22
1951–52	La Liga (I)	5th	30	15	5	10	68	51	35	RU					(Spain) Manuel Badenes	26
1952–53	La Liga (I)	2nd	30	16	8	6	66	42	40	R16					(Spain) Manuel Badenes (Spain) Antonio Fuertes	16
1953–54	La Liga (I)	3rd	30	14	6	10	69	51	34	W					(Netherlands) Faas Wilkes	18
1954–55	La Liga (I)	5th	30	15	3	12	71	60	33	QF					(Spain) Manuel Badenes	25
1955–56	La Liga (I)	6th	30	13	6	11	58	50	32	R16					(Netherlands) Faas Wilkes	11
1956–57	La Liga (I)	11th	30	10	7	13	43	46	27	SF					(Spain) Vicente Iborra	11
1957–58	La Liga (I)	4th	30	13	10	7	56	40	36	QF					(Spain) Ricardo Alós	20
1958–59	La Liga (I)	4th	30	13	7	10	47	41	33	SF					(Spain) Ricardo Alós	10
1959–60	La Liga (I)	9th	30	11	6	13	37	33	28	QF					(Paraguay) José Aveiro	12
1960–61	La Liga (I)	5th	30	11	10	9	46	42	32	R16					(Uruguay) Héctor Núñez	20
1961–62	La Liga (I)	7th	30	12	11	7	50	50	31	SF	Fairs Cup	W			(Brazil) Waldo Machado	22
1962–63	La Liga (I)	7th	30	14	3	13	49	36	31	QF	Fairs Cup	W			(Uruguay) Héctor Núñez	20
1963–64	La Liga (I)	6th	30	16	0	14	53	47	32	SF	Fairs Cup	RU			(Brazil) Waldo Machado	25
1964–65	La Liga (I)	4th	30	17	4	9	59	37	38	QF	Fairs Cup	R1			(Brazil) Waldo Machado	24
1965–66	La Liga (I)	9th	30	11	5	14	40	35	27	R16	Fairs Cup	R3			(Spain) Juan Muñoz Cerdá	12
1966–67	La Liga (I)	6th	30	14	4	12	58	37	32	W	Fairs Cup	R3			(Brazil) Waldo Machado	35
1967–68	La Liga (I)	4th	30	13	8	9	52	38	34	QF	Cup Winners' Cup	QF			(Spain) Fernando Ansola	19
1968–69	La Liga (I)	5th	30	10	11	9	36	39	31	QF	Fairs Cup	R1			(Spain) Fernando Ansola	9
1969–70	La Liga (I)	5th	30	15	5	10	35	23	35	RU	Fairs Cup	R1			(Spain) Fernando Ansola	12
1970–71	La Liga (I)	1st	30	18	7	5	41	19	43	RU	Fairs Cup	R2			(Spain) José Vicente Forment	14
1971–72	La Liga (I)	2nd	34	19	7	8	53	30	45	RU	European Cup	R2			(Spain) Quino	14
1972–73	La Liga (I)	7th	34	12	10	12	37	33	34	R16	UEFA Cup	R2			(Spain) Óscar Valdez	12
1973–74	La Liga (I)	10th	34	13	7	14	41	33	33	QF					(Spain) Quino	12
1974–75	La Liga (I)	12th	34	12	8	14	53	48	32	R5					(Spain) Pep Claramunt	12
1975–76	La Liga (I)	10th	34	12	8	14	43	41	32	R16					(Netherlands) Johnny Rep	14
1976–77	La Liga (I)	7th	34	13	10	11	53	47	36	QF					(Argentina) Mario Kempes	24
1977–78	La Liga (I)	4th	34	16	7	11	54	33	39	QF					(Argentina) Mario Kempes	39
1978–79	La Liga (I)	7th	34	14	7	13	44	39	35	W	UEFA Cup	R3			(Argentina) Mario Kempes	18
1979–80	La Liga (I)	6th	34	12	12	10	50	42	36	R16	Cup Winners' Cup	W			(Argentina) Mario Kempes	33
1980–81	La Liga (I)	4th	34	17	8	9	59	41	42	R3	Cup Winners' Cup	R2	UEFA Super Cup	W	(Uruguay) Fernando Morena	24
1981–82	La Liga (I)	5th	34	17	5	12	54	46	39	R16	UEFA Cup	QF			(Denmark) Frank Arnesen	17
1982–83	La Liga (I)	15th	34	9	7	18	42	56	25	R16	UEFA Cup	QF			(Argentina) Mario Kempes	13
1983–84	La Liga (I)	12th	34	12	8	14	45	47	32	R16					(Argentina) Mario Kempes	11
1984–85	La Liga (I)	9th	34	9	15	10	40	37	33	R16					(Uruguay) Wilmar Cabrera	14
1985–86	La Liga (I)	16th	34	8	9	17	38	62	25	R4					(Spain) Sixto Casabona	16
1986–87	Segunda División (II)	1st	34	19	8	7	53	26	46	R1					(Spain) Pedro Alcañiz	11
1987–88	La Liga (I)	14th	38	10	13	15	44	53	33	R32					(Spain) Fernando Gómez	11
1988–89	La Liga (I)	3rd	38	18	13	7	39	26	49	R32					(Spain) Fernando Gómez	15
1989–90	La Liga (I)	2nd	38	20	13	5	67	42	53	SF	UEFA Cup	R2			(Spain) Fernando Gómez	15
1990–91	La Liga (I)	7th	38	15	10	13	44	40	40	QF	UEFA Cup	R2			(Spain) Fernando Gómez	12
1991–92	La Liga (I)	4th	38	20	7	11	63	42	47	QF					(Bulgaria) Luboslav Penev	18
1992–93	La Liga (I)	4th	38	19	10	9	60	33	48	SF	UEFA Cup	R1			(Bulgaria) Luboslav Penev	21
1993–94	La Liga (I)	7th	38	14	12	12	55	50	40	R16	UEFA Cup	R2			(Federal Republic of Yugoslavia) Predrag Mijatović	19
1994–95	La Liga (I)	10th	38	13	12	13	53	48	38	RU					(Bulgaria) Luboslav Penev	16
1995–96	La Liga (I)	2nd	42	26	5	11	77	51	83	SF					(Federal Republic of Yugoslavia) Predrag Mijatović	34
1996–97	La Liga (I)	10th	42	15	11	16	63	59	56	R16	UEFA Cup	QF			(Brazil) Leandro Machado (Croatia) Goran Vlaović	10
1997–98	La Liga (I)	9th	38	16	7	15	58	52	55	R16					(Romania) Adrian Ilie	13
1998–99	La Liga (I)	4th	38	19	8	11	63	39	65	W	UEFA Cup	R2	UEFA Intertoto Cup	W	(Argentina) Claudio López	38
1999–2000	La Liga (I)	3rd	38	18	10	10	59	39	64	R2	Champions League	RU	Supercopa de España	W	(Spain) Gaizka Mendieta	19
2000–01	La Liga (I)	5th	38	18	9	11	55	34	63	R2	Champions League	RU			(Spain) Juan Sánchez	17
2001–02	La Liga (I)	1st	38	21	12	5	51	27	75	R1	UEFA Cup	QF			(Spain) Francisco Rufete (Spain) Juan Sánchez	8
2002–03	La Liga (I)	5th	38	17	9	12	56	35	60	R2	Champions League	QF	Supercopa de España	RU	(Norway) John Carew	13
2003–04	La Liga (I)	1st	38	23	8	7	71	27	77	QF	UEFA Cup	W			(Spain) Mista	24
2004–05	La Liga (I)	7th	38	14	16	8	54	39	58	R2	Champions League UEFA Cup	GS R32	UEFA Super Cup Supercopa de España	W RU	(Italy) Marco Di Vaio	14
2005–06	La Liga (I)	3rd	38	19	12	7	58	33	69	QF			UEFA Intertoto Cup	RU	(Spain) David Villa	28
2006–07	La Liga (I)	4th	38	20	6	12	57	42	66	R16	Champions League	QF			(Spain) David Villa	20
2007–08	La Liga (I)	10th	38	15	6	17	48	62	51	W	Champions League	GS			(Spain) David Villa	22
2008–09	La Liga (I)	6th	38	18	8	12	68	54	62	QF	UEFA Cup	R32	Supercopa de España	RU	(Spain) David Villa	31
2009–10	La Liga (I)	3rd	38	21	8	9	59	40	71	R16	Europa League	QF			(Spain) David Villa	28
2010–11	La Liga (I)	3rd	38	21	8	9	64	44	71	R16	Champions League	R16			(Spain) Roberto Soldado	25
2011–12	La Liga (I)	3rd	38	17	10	11	59	44	61	SF	Champions League Europa League	GS SF			(Spain) Roberto Soldado	27
2012–13	La Liga (I)	5th	38	19	8	11	67	54	65	QF	Champions League	R16			(Spain) Roberto Soldado	30
2013–14	La Liga (I)	8th	38	13	10	15	51	53	49	R16	Europa League	SF			(Spain) Paco Alcácer	14
2014–15	La Liga (I)	4th	38	22	11	5	70	32	77	R16					(Spain) Paco Alcácer	14
2015–16	La Liga (I)	12th	38	11	11	16	46	48	44	SF	Champions League Europa League	GS R16			(Spain) Paco Alcácer	15
2016–17	La Liga (I)	12th	38	13	7	18	56	65	46	R16					(Morocco) Munir (Spain) Rodrigo	7
2017–18	La Liga (I)	4th	38	22	7	9	65	38	73	SF					(Spain) Rodrigo	19
2018–19	La Liga (I)	4th	38	15	16	7	51	35	61	W	Champions League Europa League	GS SF			(Spain) Rodrigo	15
2019–20	La Liga (I)	9th	38	14	11	13	46	53	53	QF	Champions League	R16	Supercopa de España	SF	(Uruguay) Maxi Gómez	11
2020–21	La Liga (I)	13th	38	10	13	15	50	53	43	R16					(Spain) Carlos Soler	12
2021–22	La Liga (I)	9th	38	11	15	12	48	53	48	RU					(Portugal) Gonçalo Guedes	13
2022–23	La Liga (I)	16th	38	11	9	18	42	45	42	QF			Supercopa de España	SF	(Netherlands) Justin Kluivert (Brazil) Samuel Lino	8
2023–24	La Liga (I)	9th	38	13	10	15	40	45	49	R16					(Spain) Hugo Duro	13
2024–25	La Liga (I)	12th	38	11	13	14	44	54	46	QF					(Spain) Hugo Duro	11
2025–26	La Liga (I)	9th	38	13	10	15	46	55	49	QF					(Spain) Hugo Duro	11

- 90 seasons in La Liga
- 4 seasons in Segunda División
