= Progression of the most expensive transfer in Serie A =

The following list shows the chronological progression of the most expensive transfer in the history of the Serie A. All the buying teams are Italian.

The cost does not include the salary of the player, an aspect that in the last few decades the sports press usually merged.

However, the list is not complete, since in some cases between two consecutive transfers listed it is possible that there is a third one that for a period was the new record.

Date	Player	From	To	Cost
July 1942	(Italy) Valentino Mazzola and (Italy) Ezio Loik	Venezia	Torino	₤1.25 million+
19 September 1945	(Italy) Silvio Piola	Lazio	Juventus	~₤2 million
20 August 1946	(Italy) Osvaldo Fattori	Vicenza	Sampdoria	₤10 million
25 June 1949	(Italy) Giuseppe Moro	Bari	Torino	₤53 million
June 1952	(Sweden) Hasse Jeppson	Atalanta	Napoli	₤75 million
27 May 1957	(Argentina) Omar Sívori	River Plate	Juventus	~₤150 million ($ARS10 million)
10 July 1975	(Italy) Giuseppe Savoldi	Bologna	Napoli	₤2 million
June 1983	(Brazil) Zico	Flamengo	Udinese	~₤6 million ($US4 million)
30 June 1984	(Argentina) Diego Maradona	Barcelona	Napoli	~₤12.75 million ($7.5 million)
17 May 1990	(Italy) Roberto Baggio	Fiorentina	Juventus	₤16 million
30 June 1992	(Italy) Gianluigi Lentini	Torino	A.C. Milan	₤23 million
July 1997	(Brazil) Ronaldo	Barcelona	Inter Milan	~₤48 million (Pta4 million)
8 June 1999	(Italy) Christian Vieri	Lazio	Inter Milan	₤90 million
10 July 2000	(Argentina) Hernán Crespo	Parma	Lazio	₤110 million ($35.5 million)
26 July 2016	(Argentina) Gonzalo Higuain	Napoli	Juventus	€90 million
10 July 2018	(Portugal) Cristiano Ronaldo	Real Madrid	Juventus	€100 million

== See also ==
- List of most expensive association football transfers
- Football in Italy
