= Jean Varraud =

French footballer and scout (1921–2006)

Personal information
- Full name: Jean Philippe Varraud
- Date of birth: 10 May 1919
- Place of birth: Saint-Étienne, France
- Date of death: 24 June 2006 (aged 87)
- Place of death: Cannes, France
- Height: 1.76 m (5 ft 9 in)
- Position: Midfielder

Senior career*
Years	Team	Apps	(Gls)
1937–1939	Saint-Étienne		
1943–1944	Cannes		
- * Club domestic league appearances and goals

Jean Philippe Varraud (French pronunciation: [ʒɑ̃ vaʁo]; 10 May 1919 – 24 June 2006) was a French footballer and scout.

== Playing and coaching career ==
Varraud played as a footballer for Saint-Étienne, and made two appearances during the 1937–38 season, with his debut coming in a 5–0 win against Toulouse during October 1937. Afterwards, he played for AS Cannes, including their 2–1 loss to Bordeaux in the 1943–44 Championnat de France Amateur final. During World War II, he helped his former Saint-Étienne teammates Ignace Tax and Ferenc Odry by temporarily taking them in following their return from the war.

He later worked as a youth coach at Cannes, from the 1950s until 1980, helping develop players like future French internationals Vincent Estève and Charly Loubet during the 1960s, and Bernard Casoni, Yves Bertucci, Michel Dussuyer, Jean-Louis Garcia, Johan Micoud and Guy Sporn during the 1970s.

== Scouting career ==
Starting in the 1980s, Varraud worked as a scout for Cannes for two decades, helping to establish the club's identification programs and develop its youth academy.

In 1986, while working as a scout for Cannes, he spotted a 15-year-old Zinedine Zidane at the CREPS in Aix-en-Provence. Varraud recommended him to manager Jean Fernandez, who later gave him his French Division 1 debut in May 1989 against FC Nantes. Shortly after Zidane joined Cannes, Varraud was tasked with helping him channel his anger to focus more on the match itself, and ended up putting Zidane on cleaning duty during his first weeks as a punishment for punching an opponent who had mocked his background. Zidane would go on to be considered one of the best footballers of all time, and later credited Varraud as the person who most influenced his development in football, describing him as a second father.

During his time as a scout for Cannes, he also discovered Peter Luccin, Pascal Bedrossian, and Gilles Hampartzoumian.

== Death ==
Varraud died in Cannes on 24 June 2006, at the age of 87, following a battle with cancer. Zidane attended his funeral.

Following Zidane's headbutt during the 2006 FIFA World Cup final, internet rumours started circulating that it was triggered by Marco Materazzi gloating about Varraud's death.
