= Robert Barnes (footballer, born 1969) =

English footballer

Personal information
- Full name: Robert Alan Barnes
- Date of birth: 26 November 1969 (age 56)
- Place of birth: Stoke-on-Trent, England
- Position: Full-back

Youth career
- Manchester City

Senior career*
Years	Team	Apps	(Gls)
1986–1989	Manchester City	0	(0)
1989–1991	Wrexham	9	(0)
- Northwich Victoria
- * Club domestic league appearances and goals

Robert Alan Barnes (born 26 November 1969) is an English former professional footballer who played as a full-back. He made appearances in the English Football League for Wrexham. He later went on to play in non-league for Northwich Victoria.
