= Vicente Simón =

Spanish footballer

Personal information
- Full name: Vicente Simón Foj
- Date of birth: 1 March 1969 (age 57)
- Place of birth: Segorbe, Castellón, Spain
- Position: Forward

Youth career
- –1989: Teruel

Senior career*
| Years | Team | Apps | (Gls) |
| 1989–1990 | Teruel | 34 | (6) |
| 1990–1992 | Castellón | 5 | (0) |
| Total | | 39 | (6) |
- * Club domestic league appearances and goals

Vicente Simón Foj (born 1 March 1969), is a Spanish former footballer who played as a forward.

== Club career ==
Born in Segorbe, Simón spent most of his playing career with CD Teruel in the lower divisions of Spanish football. Simón turned professional with CD Castellón in 1990, and after a spell on loan at CD Almazora, he played 3 games in the 1990–91 La Liga.
