= Mark Quamina =

English footballer

Personal information
- Full name: Mark Ezzard Quamina
- Date of birth: 25 November 1969 (age 56)
- Place of birth: Sutton, England
- Position: Midfielder

Senior career*
| Years | Team | Apps | (Gls) |
| 1988–1991 | Wimbledon | 1 | (0) |
| 1990 | Aalesund | | |
| 1991–1992 | Plymouth Argyle | 5 | (0) |
| 1992–1994 | Slough Town | 59 | (0) |
| 1994–1995 | Welling United | 35 | (2) |
| 1997–1998 | Tooting & Mitcham United | 16 | (0) |
| Total | | 395 | (7) |
- * Club domestic league appearances and goals

Mark Ezzard Quamina (born 25 November 1969) is an English former professional footballer who played in the Football League as a midfielder.
