= Maino Neri =

Italian footballer and manager

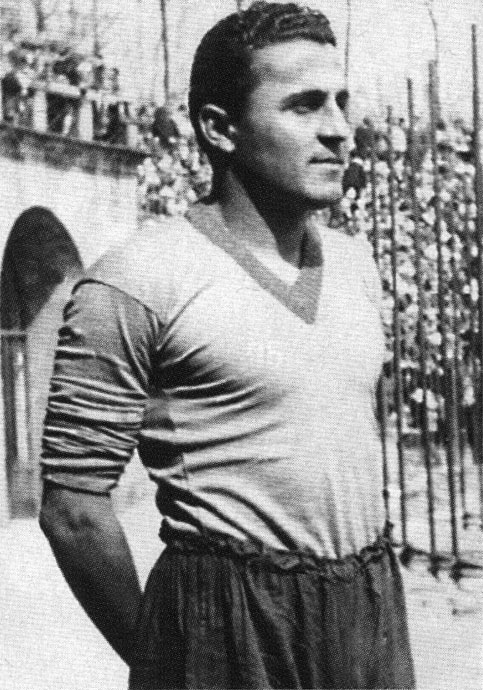
- Maino Neri, Modena, 1946-1947

Personal information
- Full name: Maino Neri
- Date of birth: 30 June 1924
- Place of birth: Carpi, Italy
- Date of death: 8 December 1995 (aged 71)
- Height: 1.70 m (5 ft 7 in)
- Position: Midfielder

Senior career*
Years	Team	Apps	(Gls)
1941–1951	Modena	250	(7)
1951–1955	Internazionale	109	(0)
Total		359	(7)

International career
1948–1954	Italy	8	(0)

Managerial career
- 1959–1960: Internazionale (youth)
- 1960–1964: Internazionale (assistant coach)
- 1964–1966: Modena
- 1966–1967: Lazio
- 1967–1969: Internazionale (assistant coach)
- 1969–1970: Como
- 1971–1972: Reggina
- 1973: Lecce
- * Club domestic league appearances and goals

Maino Neri (Italian pronunciation: [ˈmaino ˈneːri]; 30 June 1924 – 8 December 1995) was an Italian footballer and manager who played as a midfielder.

== Club career ==
Neri was born in Carpi, Modena. After spending 10 years with local side Modena, and making a couple of trips to Serie B and back, Neri, at 27 years of age, became part of Alfredo Foni's Inter. With the 'nerazzurri ', he won two consecutive Serie A championships in four years before closing his career with Brescia, which played in Serie B.

== International career ==
Neri debuted for the national team at the 1948 London Olympics wearing the captain's arm band in his first game (all eleven players were making their debut in the game against the U.S.) and played a total of eight caps, among which were games against Switzerland and Belgium at the 1954 World Cup. He was also a member of the Italy national squad that took part in the 1952 Summer Olympics.
