= Eber Moas =

Uruguayan footballer (born 1969)

Éber Moas
Personal information
- Full name: Éber Alejandro Moas Silveira
- Date of birth: 21 March 1969 (age 57)
- Place of birth: Montevideo, Uruguay
- Height: 1.82 m (5 ft 11 1/2 in)
- Position: Defender

Senior career*
Years	Team	Apps	(Gls)
1988–1991	Danubio		
1992–1994	Independiente	65	(2)
1995	América de Cali	33	(0)
1996–1998	Monterrey	81	(1)
1997	→ Vitória (loan)	15	(0)
1998–2002	Danubio	94	(1)
2005–2006	Racing Montevideo	19	(0)
2007	Rentistas		

International career
1988–1997	Uruguay	48	(0)
Medal record
Representing Uruguay
Copa América
Winner	1995 Uruguay
- * Club domestic league appearances and goals

Éber Alejandro Moas Silveira (born 21 March 1969) is a Uruguayan former footballer who played as a defender. He obtained 48 caps for his national team from 1988 to 1997.

== Club career ==
Moas started his playing career in 1988 with Danubio. He joined Club Atlético Independiente of Argentina in 1992 where he played 65 games.

In 1995, he joined América de Cali of Colombia and in 1996 he went to Mexico to play for Monterrey.

In 1998 Moas returned to Danubio where he played until 2002. In 2005, he joined Racing Club de Montevideo and in 2007 he played for Rentistas.

== International career ==
Moas earned 48 caps for the Uruguay national team from 1988 to 1997, participating in several Copa América tournaments, including the victorious campaign in 1995 when Uruguay hosted the tournament. His international debut was on September 27, 1988, against Ecuador, and he played his last match on July 20, 1997, against Bolivia.
