= Gennadi Strikalov =

Russian footballer and coach

Personal information
- Full name: Gennadi Vladimirovich Strikalov
- Date of birth: October 17, 1969 (age 57)
- Height: 1.97 m (6 ft 5 1/2 in)
- Position: Goalkeeper

Team information
- Current team: FC Dynamo Stavropol (GK coach)

Senior career*
Years	Team	Apps	(Gls)
1990	FC Kuban Ust-Labinsk (D5)		
1991	FC Mashuk Pyatigorsk	15	(0)
1992	FC Tekstilshchik Kamyshin	0	(0)
1992	FC Asmaral Kislovodsk	15	(0)
1993	FC Asmaral Moscow	0	(0)
1993–1996	FC Olimp Kislovodsk	113	(0)
1996–1999	FC Dynamo Stavropol	77	(0)
2000	FC Krylia Sovetov Samara	9	(0)
2000–2001	FC Lokomotiv Nizhny Novgorod	37	(0)
2002	FC Khimki	28	(0)
2003	FC Salyut-Energia Belgorod	16	(0)
2004–2007	did not play		
2008	FC Stavropol (D4)		
2009	FC Stavropol	15	(0)
2010	FC Dynamo-Neftyanik Neftekumsk		
2011	FC Gigant Sotnikovskoye		

Managerial career
- 2014–2015: FC Dynamo GTS Stavropol (GK coach)
- 2015–2018: FC Dynamo Stavropol (GK coach)
- 2018–: FC Dynamo Stavropol (GK coach)
- * Club domestic league appearances and goals

Gennadi Vladimirovich Strikalov (Russian: Геннадий Владимирович Стрикалов; born October 17, 1969) is a Russian professional football coach and a former player. He is a goalkeepers' coach with FC Dynamo Stavropol.

== Club career ==
He made his debut in the Russian Premier League in 2000 for FC Krylia Sovetov Samara.

== See also ==
- Football in Russia
- List of football clubs in Russia
