= Silvan Inia =

Dutch footballer

Silvan Inia (born January 24, 1969, in Hoorn, North Holland) is a retired football midfielder from the Netherlands, who made his professional debut in the 1991–1992 season for AZ Alkmaar. Later on he played for FC Volendam, Sparta Rotterdam, Stormvogels Telstar and FC Emmen.
