= Peter Kobel =

Swiss footballer (born 1969)

Personal information
- Date of birth: 25 April 1969 (age 57)
- Position: Goalkeeper

Senior career*
Years	Team	Apps	(Gls)
1987–1988	BSC Young Boys		
1988–1992	Servette FC		
1991	→ FC Solothurn		
1992–1997	BSC Young Boys		
1997	Grasshopper Club		
1998	SC Bümpliz 78		
1999–2004	FC Thun		

International career
- Switzerland u-21
- * Club domestic league appearances and goals

Peter Kobel (born 25 April 1969) is a retired Swiss football goalkeeper.
