= Giovanni Migliorini =

Italian footballer

Personal information
- Date of birth: 21 February 1931 (age 95)
- Place of birth: Milan, Italy
- Position: Striker

Senior career*
Years	Team	Apps	(Gls)
1947–1948	Maslianico		
1948–1951	Como	47	(5)
1951–1952	Internazionale	1	(0)
1952–1953	Lazio	4	(0)
1953–1954	L.R. Vicenza	7	(0)
1954–1955	Como	0	(0)
1955–1956	Carrarese		
1956–1957	Reggiana	13	(1)
1957–1960	Meda		
- * Club domestic league appearances and goals

Giovanni Migliorini (21 February 1931 – 5 January 1980) was an Italian professional football player born in Milan.
