= Helmut Lorenz =

Austrian footballer

Personal information
- Date of birth: 2 February 1969 (age 57)
- Place of birth: Oberperfuss, Austria
- Height: 1.82 m (6 ft 0 in)
- Position: Defender

Senior career*
Years	Team	Apps	(Gls)
1990–1992	WSG Wattens		
1992–1993	FC Tirol Innsbruck		
1993–1997	LASK Linz		
1997–1998	SC Austria Lustenau		
1998–2000	WSG Wattens		

Managerial career
- 2008–2009: SC Schwaz
- * Club domestic league appearances and goals

Helmut Lorenz (born 2 February 1969) is a retired Austrian football defender.
