= Lieuwe Steiger =

Dutch footballer

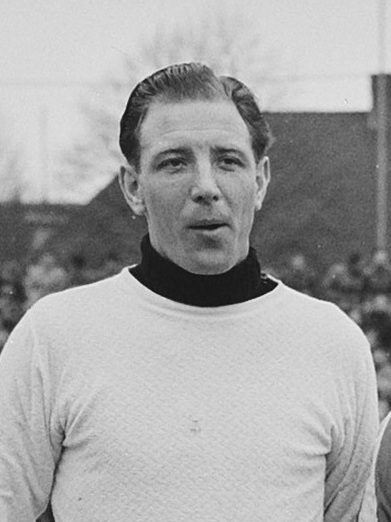

Lieuwe Steiger (born in Haarlem, 15 April 1924 – died in Eindhoven, 17 October 2006) was a Dutch football goalkeeper.

He played 383 Eredivisie matches with PSV Eindhoven (1942-1957, 1959), playing also for the Netherlands national football team in 1953-54. In the European Cup 1955–56 he played PSV first round matches against SK Rapid Wien. He died aged 82 years old.
