= David Gipp =

English footballer

Personal information
- Full name: David Thomas Gipp
- Date of birth: 13 July 1969 (age 57)
- Place of birth: Forest Gate, England
- Height: 5 ft 7 in (1.70 m)
- Position: Forward

Youth career
- –1987: Brighton & Hove Albion

Senior career*
Years	Team	Apps	(Gls)
1987–1989	Brighton & Hove Albion	5	(0)
1989–1990	Barnet	13	(3)
1989–1990	→ Fisher Athletic (loan)	2	(1)
1990	→ Wycombe Wanderers (loan)	5	(0)
1990	→ Chelmsford City (loan)		
1990–	Wealdstone		
- Chesham United
- Harrow Borough
- Chesham United
- Braintree Town
- Southwick
- Aveley
- St Albans City
?–2002	Harold Wood Athletic		
2001–2002	Whitehawk	1	(1)
- Worthing
2004–2005	Whitehawk	1	(1)
- * Club domestic league appearances and goals

David Thomas Gipp (born 13 July 1969) is an English former professional footballer who played as a forward in the Football League for Brighton & Hove Albion.

== Career ==
Gipp started his career as an apprentice at Brighton & Hove Albion and was a regular goalscorer for the reserve side. He made his first team debut in April 1987 in a 1–1 draw with Blackburn Rovers, coming on as a substitute and almost scoring with his first touch. He only made a further four league appearances before he was released in July 1989. He later joined Football Conference side Barnet who were managed by Barry Fry, but failed to break into the starting lineup on a regular basis, only making thirteen league appearances and scoring three times as the side finished as runners-up. During the 1989–90 season he was loaned out to divisional rivals Fisher Athletic and Wycombe Wanderers, and also a short period at Chelmsford City. In August 1990, Southern League Premier Division side Wealdstone broke their transfer record with a £15,000 bid to sign Gipp. He later played for a number of non-league teams across the southern counties before retiring. His final game was for Whitehawk on 24 August 2004, when he scored in a 3–1 win against Southwick.

== Personal life ==
Gipp has attracted some controversy on social media platform, X - frequently posting inflammatory and racially motivated statements about Asians and Africans. After his professional football career finished he became an East End independent market trader. He lived in Barkingside with his wife Tracey and three children, Jack and Megan and Billy.
