= Michalis Christofi =

Cypriot footballer (born 1969)

Personal information
- Date of birth: 24 July 1969 (age 57)
- Position: Goalkeeper

Senior career*
Years	Team	Apps	(Gls)
1989–1997	Apollon Limassol FC		
1997–1998	AEL Limassol FC		

International career
1991–1997	Cyprus	18	(0)
- * Club domestic league appearances and goals

Michalis Christofi (born 24 July 1969) is a retired Cypriot football goalkeeper.
