= Mark Wrench =

English footballer

Personal information
- Full name: Mark Nicholas Wrench
- Date of birth: 27 September 1969 (age 57)
- Place of birth: Warrington, England
- Position: Full-back

Youth career
- Wrexham

Senior career*
Years	Team	Apps	(Gls)
1988–1990	Wrexham	6	(0)
1990–1992	Northwich Victoria		
1992	Hyde United	22	(1)
- * Club domestic league appearances and goals

Mark Nicholas Wrench (born 27 September 1969) is an English former footballer who played as a full-back. He played in the football league for Wrexham between 1988 and 1990. He also played non-league football for Northwich Victoria and Hyde United.
