= Licio Rossetti =

Italian footballer

Personal information
- Date of birth: 1 November 1925
- Place of birth: Trieste, Italy
- Date of death: 10 December 1993 (aged 68)
- Place of death: Trieste, Italy
- Position: Midfielder

Senior career*
Years	Team	Apps	(Gls)
1943–1944	Triestina	1	(0)
1945–1950	Triestina	169	(30)
1950–1951	Internazionale	11	(3)
1951–1953	Genoa	15	(1)
1953–1954	Triestina	15	(6)
1954–1957	Piacenza	67	(6)
- * Club domestic league appearances and goals

Licio Rossetti (born 1 November 1925 in Trieste; died 10 December 1993 in Trieste) was an Italian professional football player.
