= Andros Christofi =

Cypriot footballer (born 1969)

Personal information
- Full name: Andreas Christofi
- Date of birth: 21 April 1969 (age 57)
- Position: Goalkeeper

Senior career*
Years	Team	Apps	(Gls)
1990–1996	Aris Limassol FC		
1996–2002	AC Omonia		

International career
1994	Cyprus	2	(0)
- * Club domestic league appearances and goals

Andros Christofi (born 21 April 1969) is a retired Cypriot football goalkeeper.
