= Piero Pozzi =

Italian footballer (1920–1991)

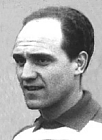

Personal information
- Date of birth: 18 October 1920
- Place of birth: Vercelli, Italy
- Date of death: 7 December 1991 (aged 71)
- Position: Midfielder

Senior career*
Years	Team	Apps	(Gls)
1939–1941	Pirelli Milano		
1941–1942	Alfa Romeo Milano		
1942–1950	Pro Patria	159	(8)
1950–1951	Internazionale	14	(2)
1951–1952	Torino	34	(3)
1952–1953	Cagliari	9	(1)
1953–1954	Biellese	5	(1)
1954–1955	Lecco	3	(0)
- * Club domestic league appearances and goals

Piero Pozzi (18 October 1920 – 7 December 1991) was an Italian professional football player.

Pozzi was born in Vercelli on 18 October 1920, and died on 7 December 1991, at the age of 71.

== Sources ==
- Profile at Enciclopediadelcalcio.it
