= Gilles Hampartzoumian =

French footballer (born 1969)

Personal information
- Date of birth: 20 May 1969 (age 57)
- Place of birth: Marseille
- Position: Defender

Senior career*
Years	Team	Apps	(Gls)
1988–1991	AS Cannes		
1991–1992	Stade de Vallauris		
1992–1996	AS Cannes		
1996–1997	Lille OSC		
1997–1998	AS Cannes		
1998–2000	US Endoume		
2000–2002	US Cagnes		
- * Club domestic league appearances and goals

Gilles Hampartzoumian (born 20 May 1969) is a retired French football defender.
