= Wojciech Tomasiewicz =

Polish footballer

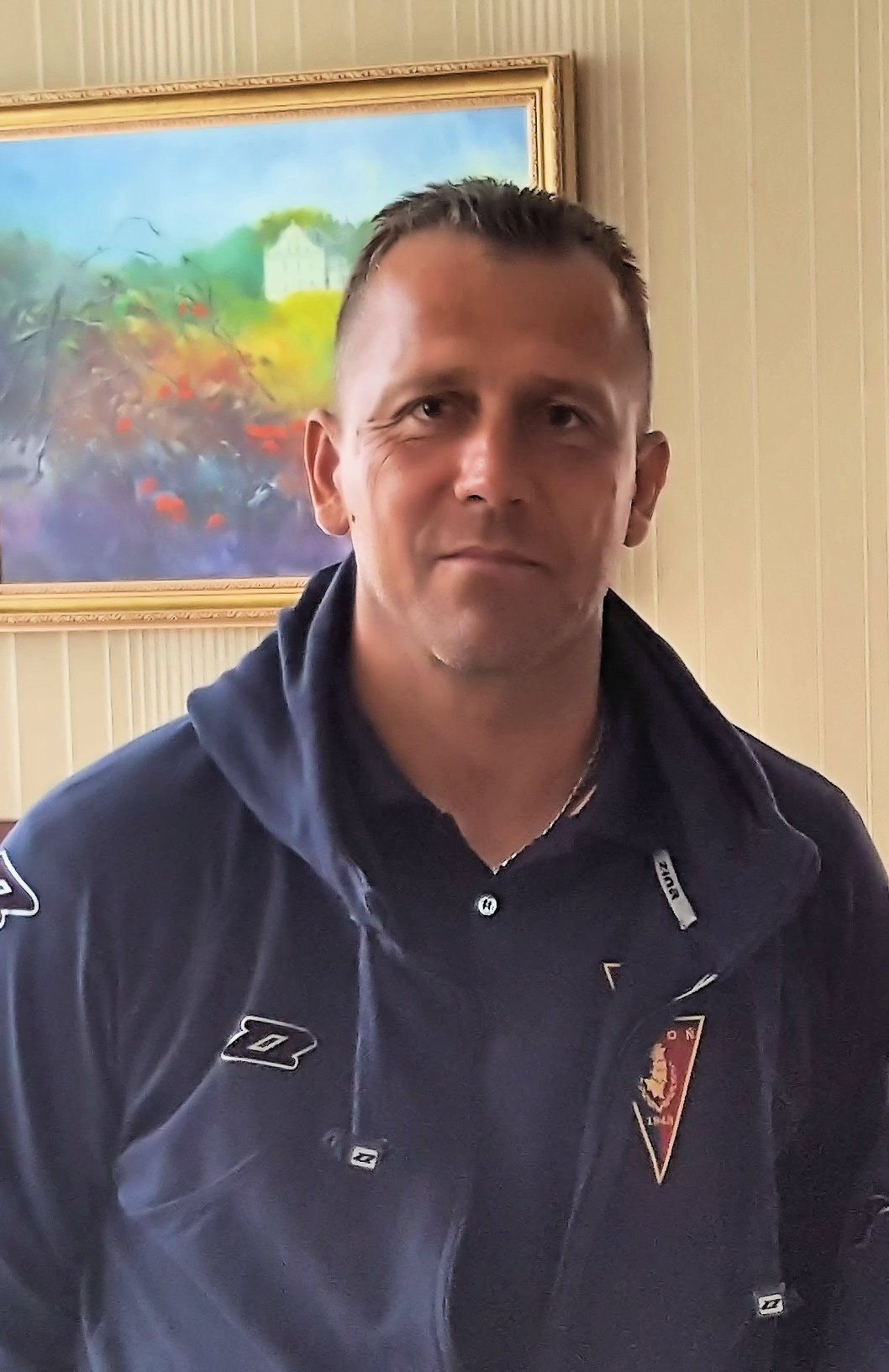
- Tomasiewicz in 2017 with Pogoń Szczecin

Personal information
- Date of birth: 18 June 1969 (age 57)
- Place of birth: Ostróda, Poland
- Height: 1.94 m (6 ft 4 in)
- Position: Goalkeeper

Team information
- Current team: Pogoń Szczecin U19 (goalkeeping coach)

Youth career
- Sokół Ostróda

Senior career*
Years	Team	Apps	(Gls)
1986–1988	Stomil Olsztyn		
1988–1993	Pogoń Szczecin		
1993–1994	Boston Faialance		
1995	Energetyk Gryfino		
1995–2002	Pogoń Szczecin		
2003–2004	Wacker 90 Nordhausen	5	(0)
2004–2005	Arkonia Szczecin		
2005	KKS Koluszki		
2006	Orzeł Parzęczew		
2015	Mewa Resko		
- * Club domestic league appearances and goals

Wojciech Tomasiewicz (born 18 June 1969) is a Polish former professional footballer who played as a goalkeeper.
