= Pietro Broccini =

Italian footballer (1928–2006)

Pietro Broccini (2 January 1928, in Portovenere, La Spezia – 2 September 2006, in Sanremo, Imperia) was an Italian football (soccer) player in the midfielder role.

In his career, he played 33 Serie A matches with Inter Milan and won two Italian titles in 1953 and 1954.

He played also with Spal Ferrara from 1954 to 1959 and Sanremese from 1959 to 1961.

He died at 78 years old.
