= Brian Tevreden (footballer, born 1969) =

Dutch footballer

Brian Tevreden (born 17 June 1969) is a Dutch former professional footballer who played as a forward for Eredivisie and Eerste Divisie clubs HFC Haarlem, Stormvogels Telstar, SC Heerenveen and SC Cambuur between 1987 and 2002. He coached vv IJmuiden, FC Velsenoord and more dutch amateur teams.
