= Bruno Padulazzi =

Italian footballer (1927-2005)

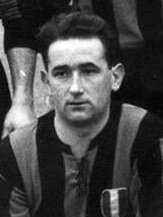

Personal information
- Date of birth: September 3, 1927
- Place of birth: Lesa, Italy
- Date of death: February 27, 2005 (aged 77)
- Place of death: Lesa, Italy
- Position: Left back

Senior career*
Years	Team	Apps	(Gls)
1946–1948	Arona		
1948–1949	Legnano	32	(0)
1949–1950	Lucchese	38	(1)
1950–1955	Internazionale	95	(1)
1955–1956	Torino	11	(0)
1956–1958	Marzotto Valdagno	49	(1)
- * Club domestic league appearances and goals

Bruno Padulazzi (September 3, 1927 in Lesa – February 27, 2005 in Lesa) was an Italian professional football player.

== Honours ==
- Serie A champion: 1952/53, 1953/54.
