= Jan Ekholm =

Swedish footballer

Personal information
- Full name: Jan Tomas Ekholm
- Date of birth: 3 December 1969 (age 56)
- Place of birth: Söderhamn, Sweden
- Height: 1.83 m (6 ft 0 in)
- Position: Goalkeeper

Senior career*
Years	Team	Apps	(Gls)
- IFK Sundsvall

International career
1990–1992	Sweden U21/O	21	(0)
- * Club domestic league appearances and goals

Jan Tomas Ekholm (born 3 December 1969) is a Swedish former professional footballer who played as a goalkeeper. He was a member of the Sweden Olympic team competing at the 1992 Summer Olympics in Barcelona.
