= Alfredo Travia =

Italian footballer (1924-2000)

Personal information
- Date of birth: February 22, 1924
- Place of birth: Syracuse, Italy
- Date of death: October 17, 2000 (aged 76)
- Position: Defender

Senior career*
Years	Team	Apps	(Gls)
1946–1947	ArsenalTaranto	27	(0)
1947–1951	Como	137	(0)
1951–1953	Pro Patria	69	(1)
1953–1955	Juventus	22	(0)
1955–1956	Alessandria	22	(0)
- * Club domestic league appearances and goals

Alfredo Travia (February 22, 1924 - October 17, 2000) was an Italian professional football player.
