= Osvaldo Fattori =

Italian footballer

Personal information
- Full name: Osvaldo Fattori
- Date of birth: 22 June 1922
- Place of birth: San Michele Extra, Kingdom of Italy
- Date of death: 27 December 2017 (aged 95)
- Place of death: Milan, Italy
- Height: 1.70 m (5 ft 7 in)
- Position: Defender

Senior career*
Years	Team	Apps	(Gls)
1939–1941	Audace	?	(?)
1941–1946	Vicenza	93	(4)
1946–1947	Sampdoria	35	(0)
1947–1954	Inter	178	(7)
1954–1959	Brescia	87	(6)

International career
1949–1950	Italy	4	(0)
1950	Italy B	1	(0)
- * Club domestic league appearances and goals

Osvaldo Fattori (Italian pronunciation: [oˈzvaldo fatˈtoːri]; 22 June 1922 – 27 December 2017) was an Italian association footballer who played as a defender or midfielder.

== Club career ==
Fattori was born in San Michele Extra, Verona. After having been a player for Audace San Michele, which later gave rise to Mariolino Corso, Fattori moved to Vicenza, making his Serie A debut as the club's starting defensive midfielder. In 1946 he went to Sampdoria, which acquired him (along with Bassetto) for a record 10 million lira after exhaustive bargaining with Inter. He would get to Inter in the summer of 1947 after only 12 months with Sampdoria. With Inter, Fattori would stay for seven seasons winning two championships in 1953 and 1954.

== International career ==
At international level, Fattori earned four caps for the national team, including the win against Paraguay in the 1950 World Cup.

== See also ==
- Progression of the most expensive transfer in Serie A
