= Faas Wilkes =

Dutch footballer (1923–2006)

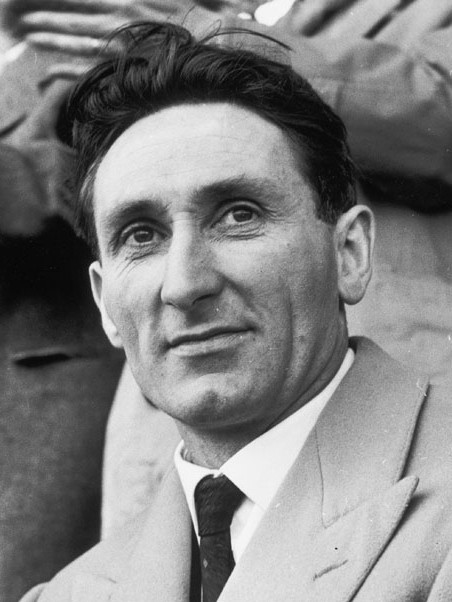
- Wilkes in 1960

Personal information
- Full name: Servaas Wilkes
- Date of birth: 13 October 1923
- Place of birth: Rotterdam, Netherlands
- Date of death: 15 August 2006 (aged 82)
- Place of death: Rotterdam, Netherlands
- Height: 1.84 m (6 ft 0 in)
- Position: Forward

Youth career
- 1933–1934: RSV HION
- 1934–1941: Xerxes Rotterdam

Senior career*
| Years | Team | Apps | (Gls) |
| 1941–1949 | Xerxes Rotterdam | 71 | (49) |
| 1949–1952 | Inter Milan | 95 | (47) |
| 1952–1953 | Torino | 12 | (1) |
| 1953–1956 | Valencia | 62 | (38) |
| 1956–1958 | VVV | 64 | (23) |
| 1958–1959 | Levante | 34 | (20) |
| 1959–1962 | Fortuna '54 | 88 | (33) |
| 1962–1964 | Xerxes Rotterdam | 28 | (10) |
| Total | | 454 | (221) |

International career
| 1946–1961 | Netherlands | 38 | (35) |
- * Club domestic league appearances and goals

Servaas "Faas" Wilkes (Dutch pronunciation: [faːs ˈʋɪlkəs]; 13 October 1923 – 15 August 2006) was a Dutch football forward, who earned a total of 38 caps for the Netherlands national team, in which he scored 35 goals (average 0.92 goals per game). However, for a prolonged period of his career, June 1949 through till March 1955, he was banned from the national team since the KNVB did not allow professional players to participate. He also played for the Netherlands at the 1948 Summer Olympics.

== Career ==
Wilkes played for Xerxes Rotterdam, before moving to Internazionale in the summer of 1949. There he played 95 matches, scoring 47 goals. After his stay in Milan ended in 1952, he had a one-season spell at Torino. At age 30 he moved to Valencia in Spain, scoring a total of 38 goals in 62 appearances between 1953–54 and 1955–56, making him the first foreign idol of the club. He also played for VVV, Levante, and Fortuna '54. He died of a cardiac arrest in 2006, aged 82.

He is considered one of the best footballers the Netherlands ever produced, being especially known for his creative style of play and brilliant dribbling. Wilkes was the 4th Dutch player (after Gerrit Keizer, Bep Bakhuys and Gerrit Vreken) who moved to play abroad. He held the record of most goals scored for the Netherlands national team from 1959 until 1998.

The Dutch cartoon character Kick Wilstra was named in part after Faas Wilkes (Wilstra was also named after two other Dutch men's footballers, Kick Smit and Abe Lenstra). Together with Kees Rijvers and Abe Lenstra, Wilkes formed the renowned Gouden Binnentrio (The Golden Inner Three) of the Dutch national team between the late 1940s and 1950s; though the three only played together in ten matches (of which they lost one), they scored 23 goals.

== Gallery ==
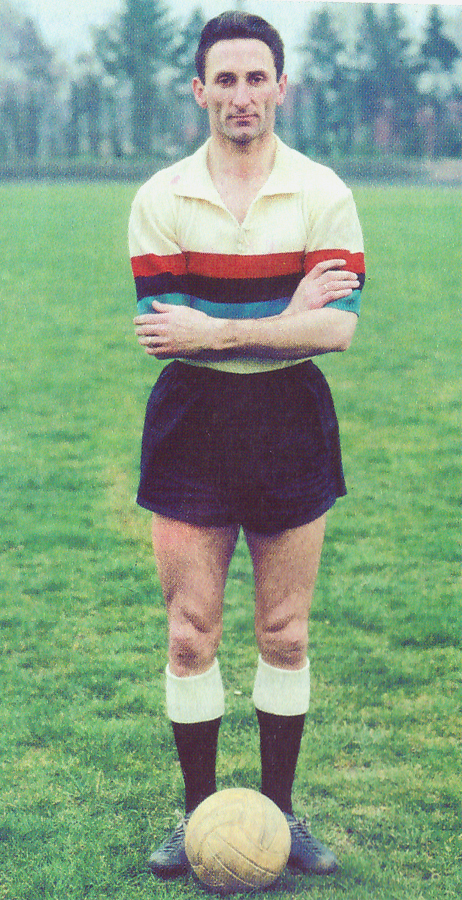

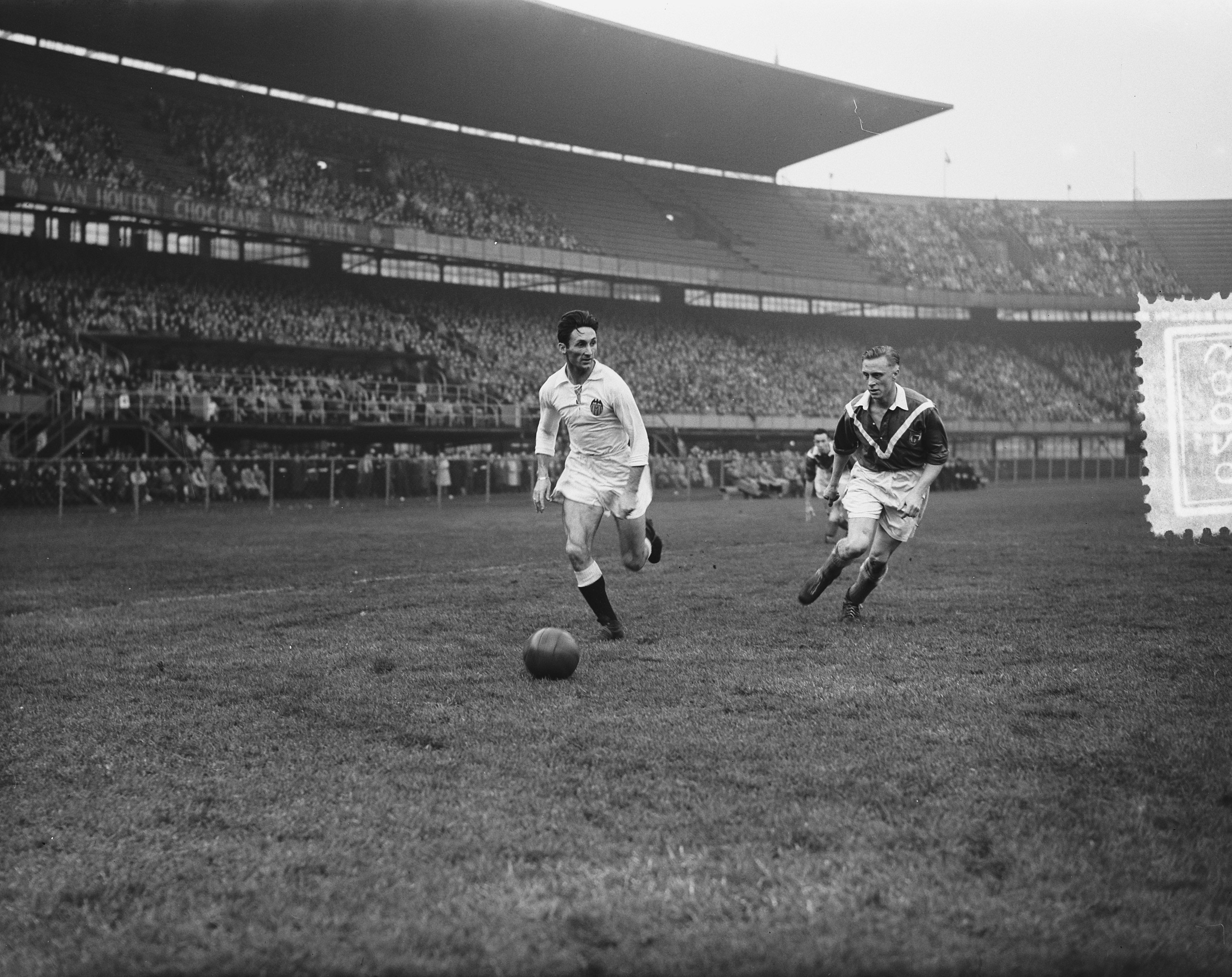

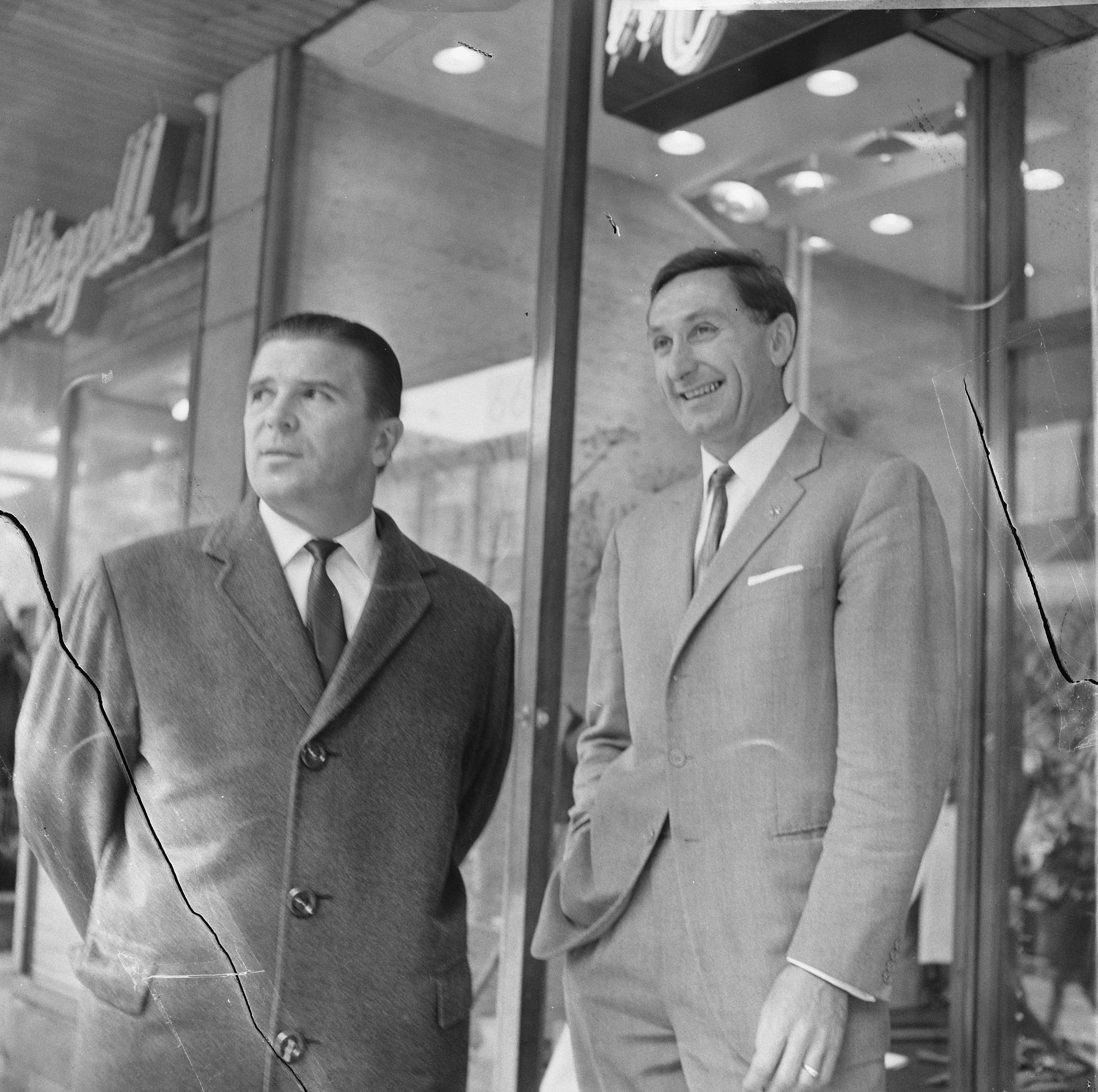

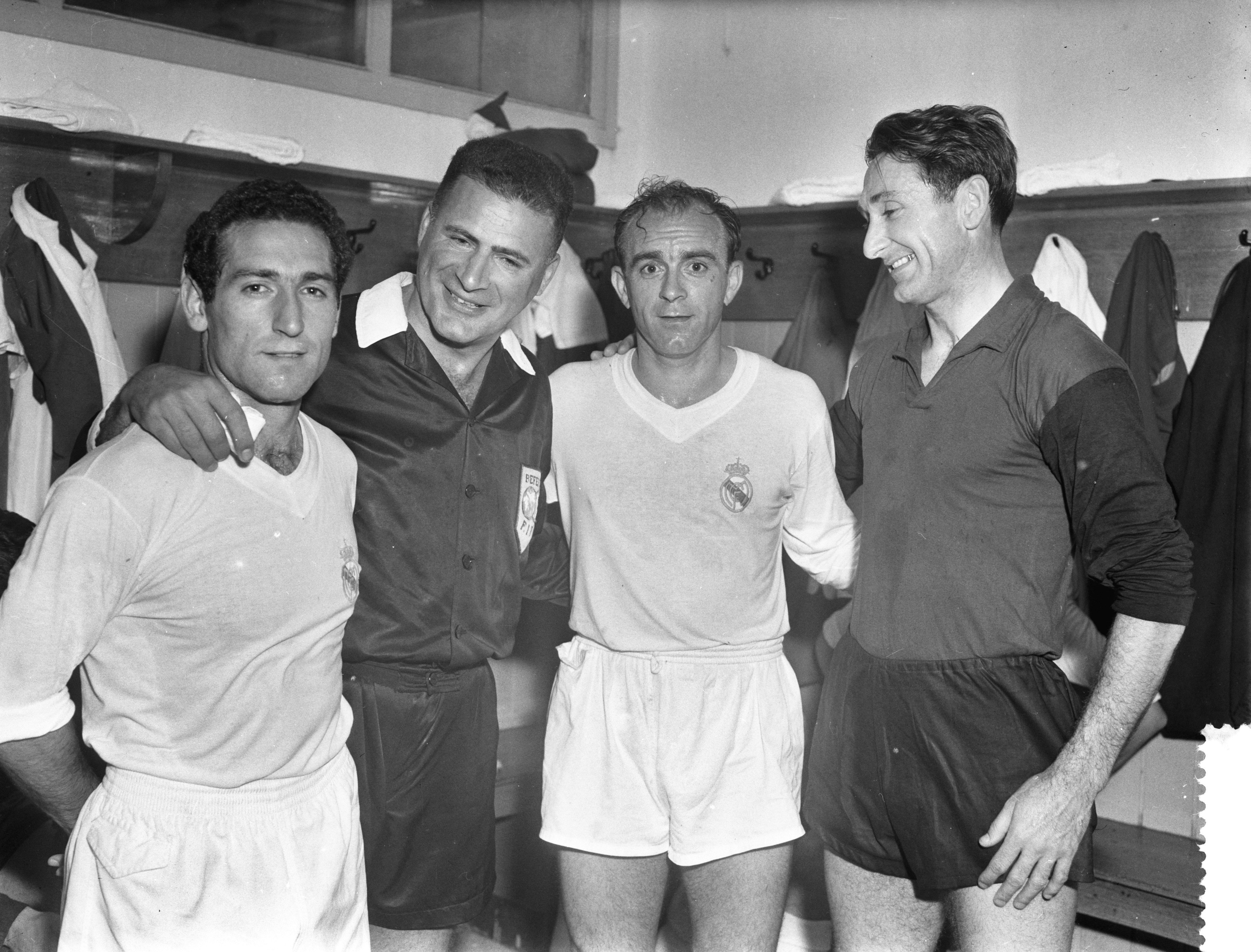

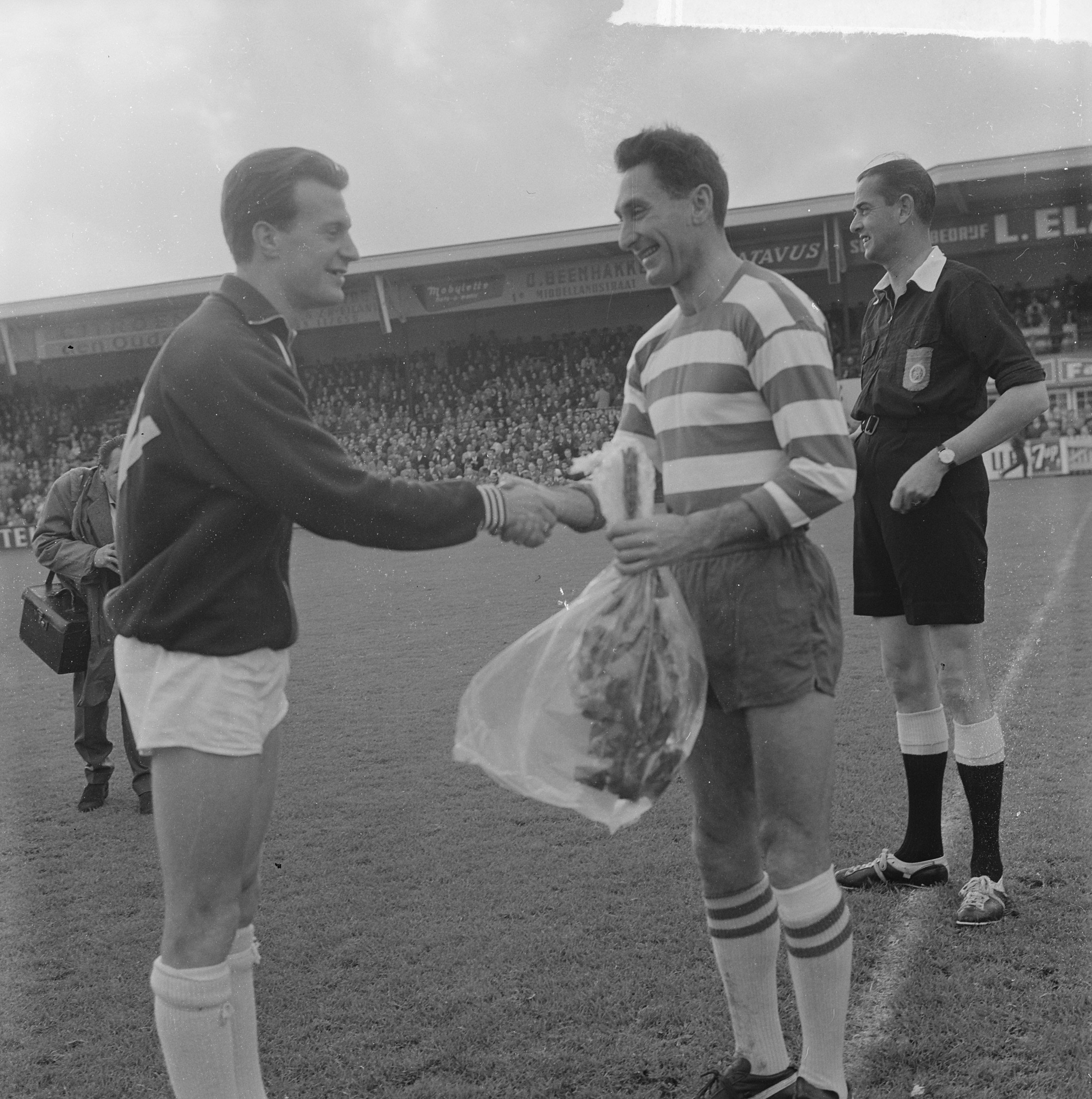

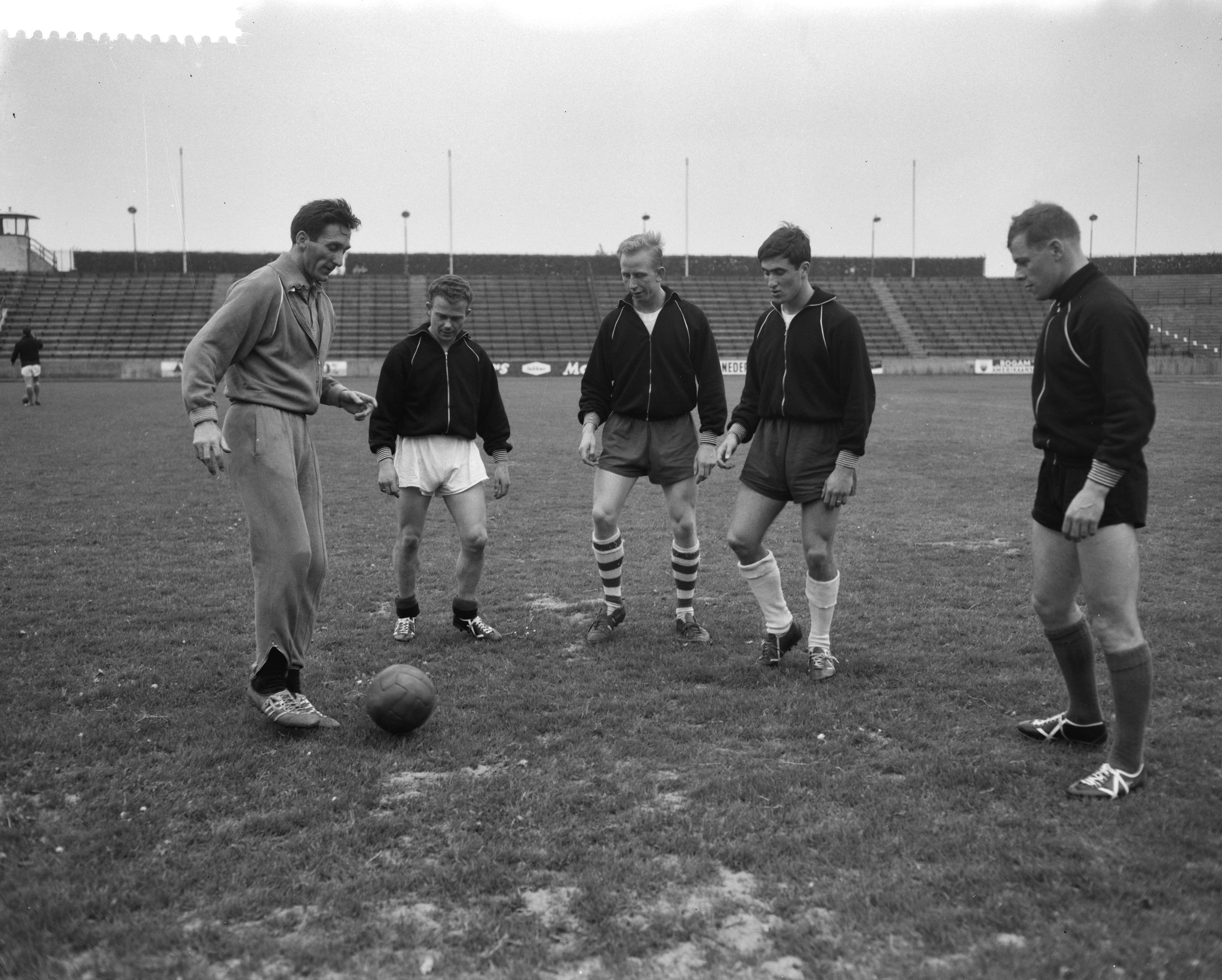

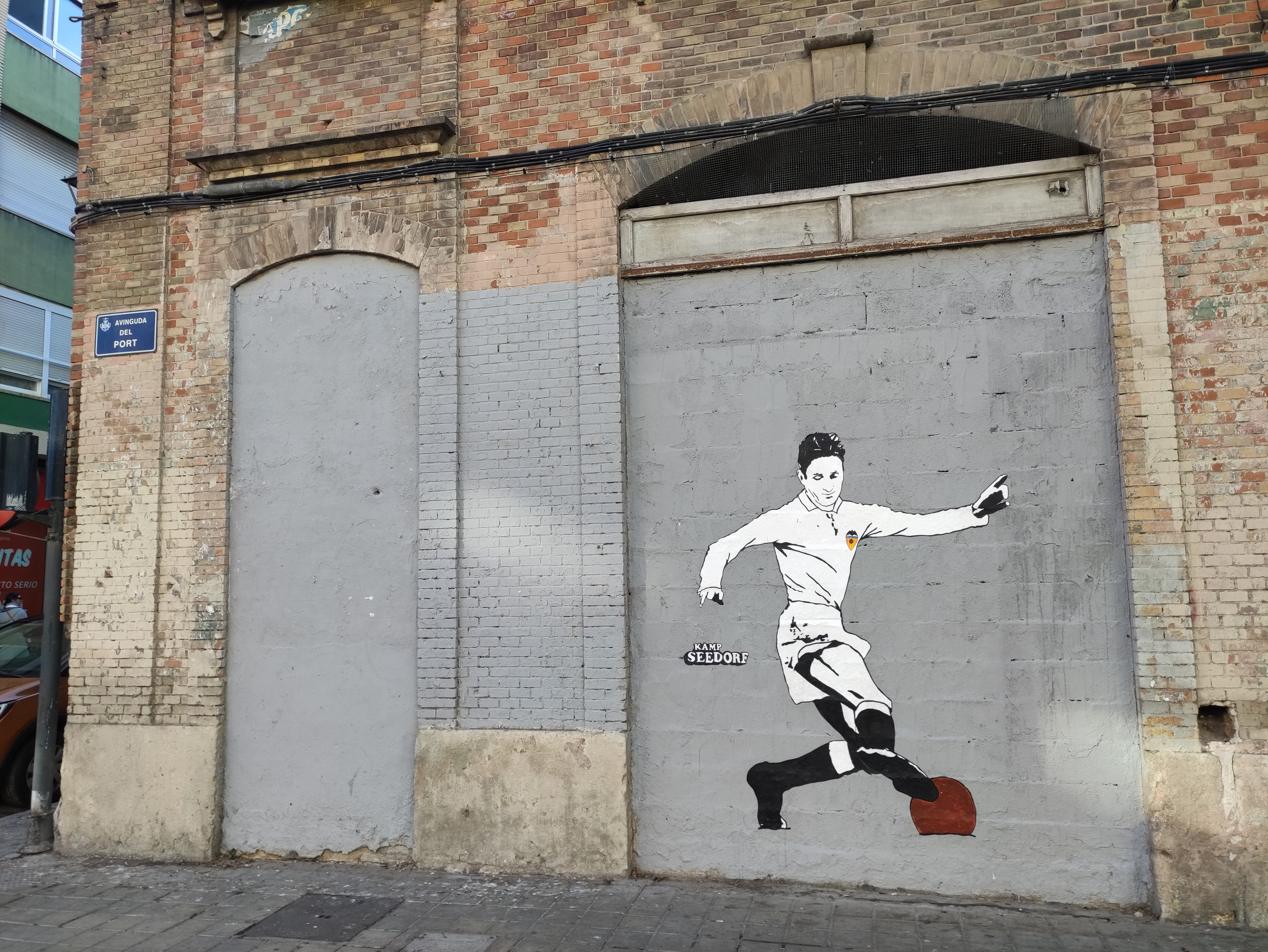

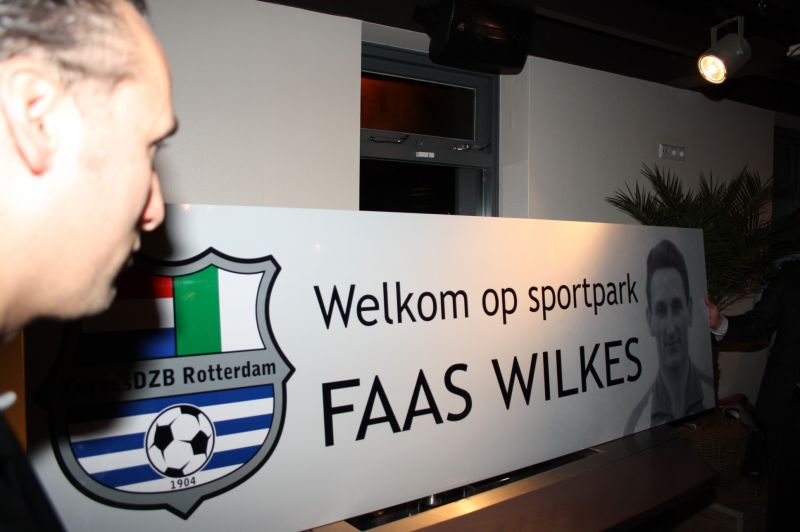

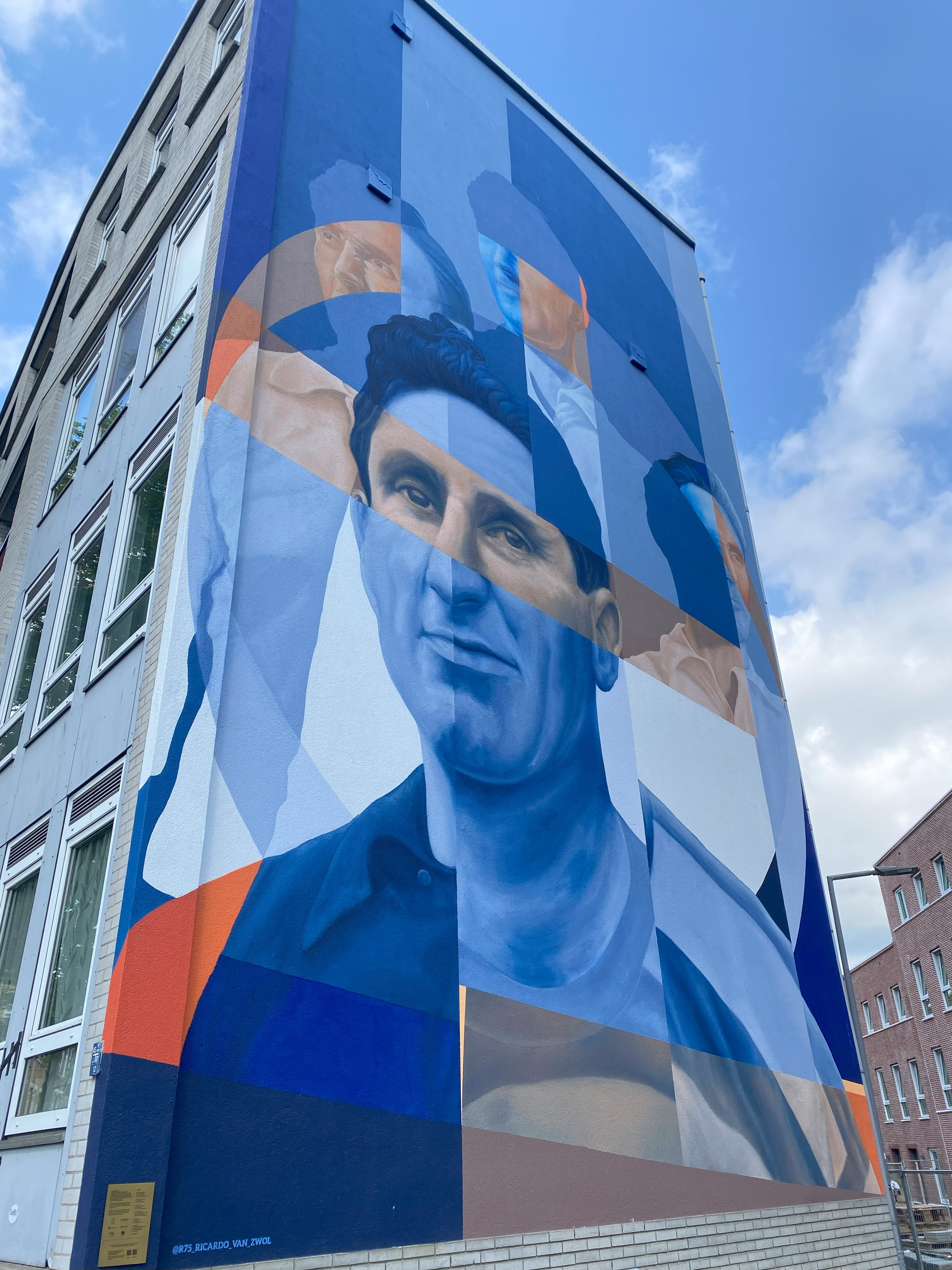

== Career statistics ==
=== Player ===
| Club | Season | League | | | Cup | | Europe | | Other | | Total | |
| Club | Season | | Apps | Goals | Apps | Goals | Apps | Goals | Apps | Goals | Apps | Goals |
|---|---|---|---|---|---|---|---|---|---|---|---|---|
| Xerxes Rotterdam | 1945–46 | | 3 | 1 | | | – | | | | 3 | 1 |
| Xerxes Rotterdam | 1946–47 | | 19 | 8 | | | – | | | | 19 | 8 |
| Xerxes Rotterdam | 1947–48 | | 24 | 19 | | | – | | | | 24 | 19 |
| Xerxes Rotterdam | 1948–49 | | 25 | 21 | | | – | | | | 25 | 21 |
| Xerxes Rotterdam | Total | | 71 | 49 | | | | | | | 71 | 49 |
| Internazionale | 1949–50 | Serie A | 34 | 17 | | | | | | | 34 | 17 |
| Internazionale | 1950–51 | Serie A | 38 | 23 | | | | | | | 38 | 23 |
| Internazionale | 1951–52 | Serie A | 23 | 7 | | | | | | | 23 | 7 |
| Internazionale | Total | | 95 | 47 | | | | | | | 95 | 47 |
| Torino | 1952–53 | Serie A | 12 | 1 | | | | | | | 12 | 1 |
| Valencia | 1953–54 | La Liga | 28 | 18 | | | | | | | 28 | 18 |
| Valencia | 1954–55 | La Liga | 15 | 9 | | | | | | | 15 | 9 |
| Valencia | 1955–56 | La Liga | 19 | 11 | | | | | | | 19 | 11 |
| Valencia | Total | | 62 | 38 | | | | | | | 62 | 38 |
| Venlo | 1956–57 | Eredivisie | 30 | 8 | | | | | | | 30 | 8 |
| Venlo | 1957–58 | Eredivisie | 34 | 15 | | | | | | | 34 | 15 |
| Venlo | Total | | 64 | 23 | | | | | | | 64 | 23 |
| Levante | 1958–59 | Segunda División | 34 | 20 | | | | | | | 34 | 20 |
| Fortuna '54 | 1959–60 | Eredivisie | 30 | 16 | | | | | | | 30 | 16 |
| Fortuna '54 | 1960–61 | Eredivisie | 27 | 5 | | | | | | | 27 | 5 |
| Fortuna '54 | 1961–62 | Eredivisie | 31 | 12 | | | | | | | 31 | 12 |
| Fortuna '54 | Total | | 88 | 33 | | | | | | | 88 | 33 |
| Xerxes Rotterdam | 1962–63 | Tweede Divisie B | 20 | 8 | | | | | | | 20 | 8 |
| Xerxes Rotterdam | 1963–64 | Tweede Divisie B | 8 | 2 | | | | | | | 8 | 2 |
| Xerxes Rotterdam | Total | | 28 | 10 | | | | | | | 28 | 10 |
| Total | | | 454 | 221 | | | | | | | 454 | 221 |

=== International ===
Scores and results list Netherlands's goal tally first, score column indicates score after each Wilkes goal.

List of international goals scored by Faas Wilkes
| No. | Date | Venue | Opponent | Score | Result | Competition | Ref. |
|---|---|---|---|---|---|---|---|
| 1 | 10 March 1946 | Stade Municipal, Luxembourg City, Luxembourg | Luxembourg | 1-0 | 6-2 | Friendly | |
| 2 | 10 March 1946 | Stade Municipal, Luxembourg City, Luxembourg | Luxembourg | 2-1 | 6-2 | Friendly | |
| 3 | 10 March 1946 | Stade Municipal, Luxembourg City, Luxembourg | Luxembourg | 3-1 | 6-2 | Friendly | |
| 4 | 10 March 1946 | Stade Municipal, Luxembourg City, Luxembourg | Luxembourg | 6-1 | 6-2 | Friendly | |
| 5 | 12 May 1946 | Olympic Stadium, Amsterdam, Netherlands | Belgium | 1-1 | 6-3 | Friendly | |
| 6 | 12 May 1946 | Olympic Stadium, Amsterdam, Netherlands | Belgium | 5-3 | 6-3 | Friendly | |
| 7 | 12 May 1946 | Olympic Stadium, Amsterdam, Netherlands | Belgium | 6-3 | 6-3 | Friendly | |
| 8 | 30 May 1946 | Bosuilstadion, Antwerp, Belgium | Belgium | 1-0 | 2-2 | Friendly | |
| 9 | 30 May 1946 | Bosuilstadion, Antwerp, Belgium | Belgium | 2-0 | 2-2 | Friendly | |
| 10 | 21 September 1947 | Olympic Stadium, Amsterdam, Netherlands | Switzerland | 2-1 | 6-2 | Friendly | |
| 11 | 21 September 1947 | Olympic Stadium, Amsterdam, Netherlands | Switzerland | 6-2 | 6-2 | Friendly | |
| 12 | 9 June 1948 | Olympic Stadium, Amsterdam, Netherlands | Sweden | 1-0 | 1-0 | Friendly | |
| 13 | 26 July 1948 | Fratton Park, Portsmouth, United Kingdom | Republic of Ireland | 1-0 | 3-1 | 1948 Summer Olympics | |
| 14 | 26 July 1948 | Fratton Park, Portsmouth, United Kingdom | Republic of Ireland | 3-1 | 3-1 | 1948 Summer Olympics | |
| 15 | 31 July 1948 | Arsenal Stadium, London, United Kingdom | Great Britain | 3-3 | 3-4 | 1948 Summer Olympics | |
| 16 | 23 April 1949 | De Kuip, Rotterdam, Netherlands | France | 4-1 | 4-1 | Friendly | |
| 17 | 12 June 1949 | Københavns Idrætspark, Copenhagen, Denmark | Denmark | 2-1 | 2-1 | Friendly | |
| 18 | 19 May 1955 | De Kuip, Rotterdam, Netherlands | Switzerland | 1-0 | 4-1 | Friendly | |
| 19 | 19 May 1955 | De Kuip, Rotterdam, Netherlands | Switzerland | 4-0 | 4-1 | Friendly | |
| 20 | 6 June 1956 | Olympic Stadium, Amsterdam, Netherlands | Saar | 3-1 | 3-2 | Friendly | |
| 21 | 3 April 1957 | Olympic Stadium, Amsterdam, Netherlands | West Germany | 1-1 | 1-2 | Friendly | |
| 22 | 11 September 1957 | De Kuip, Rotterdam, Netherlands | Luxembourg | 2-1 | 5-2 | 1958 FIFA World Cup qualification | |
| 23 | 17 November 1957 | De Kuip, Rotterdam, Netherlands | Belgium | 3-0 | 5-2 | Friendly | |
| 24 | 17 November 1957 | De Kuip, Rotterdam, Netherlands | Belgium | 4-0 | 5-2 | Friendly | |
| 25 | 13 April 1958 | Bosuilstadion, Antwerp, Belgium | Belgium | 5-1 | 7-2 | Friendly | |
| 26 | 13 April 1958 | Bosuilstadion, Antwerp, Belgium | Belgium | 6-1 | 7-2 | Friendly | |
| 27 | 23 April 1958 | De Kuip, Rotterdam, Netherlands | Netherlands Antilles | 1-0 | 8-1 | Friendly | |
| 28 | 23 April 1958 | De Kuip, Rotterdam, Netherlands | Netherlands Antilles | 2-0 | 8-1 | Friendly | |
| 29 | 4 May 1958 | Olympic Stadium, Amsterdam, Netherlands | Turkey | 1-0 | 1-2 | Friendly | |
| 30 | 4 October 1959 | De Kuip, Rotterdam, Netherlands | Belgium | 3-0 | 9-1 | Friendly | |
| 31 | 4 October 1959 | De Kuip, Rotterdam, Netherlands | Belgium | 4-0 | 9-1 | Friendly | |
| 32 | 4 October 1959 | De Kuip, Rotterdam, Netherlands | Belgium | 6-0 | 9-1 | Friendly | |
| 33 | 4 November 1959 | De Kuip, Rotterdam, Netherlands | Norway | 3-1 | 7-1 | Friendly | |
| 34 | 4 November 1959 | De Kuip, Rotterdam, Netherlands | Norway | 7-1 | 7-1 | Friendly | |
| 35 | 19 April 1961 | Olympic Stadium, Amsterdam, Netherlands | Mexico | 1-1 | 1-2 | Friendly | |

== Honours ==
Internazionale

- Serie A runner-up: 1950–51
- Serie A third place: 1949–50, 1951–52

Valencia

- La Liga Third Place: 1953–54
- Copa del Generalísimo: 1954
- Concepción Arenal Trophy: 1954

Levante

- Segunda División Runner-up: 1958–59

Individual

- Netherlands All-Time Top Scorer: 1959–1998
- Spanish Player of the Year: 1954
- Valencia Top Scorer: 1953–54, 1955–56
- Levante Top Scorer: 1958–59
