= 1957–58 Alessandria US season =

Alessandria U.S.
1957–58 season
- Chairman: Silvio Sacco
- Head Coaches: Luciano Robotti; Franco Pedroni
- Stadium: Stadio Giuseppe Moccagatta, Alessandria
- Serie A: 12th
- Top goalscorer: Roger Vonlanthen (8)
Home colours	Away colours

The 1957–58 season of Alessandria Unione Sportiva's was their 46th in Italian football and their 11th in Serie A.

Following a nine-year absence from Serie A, Alessandria U.S. signed several players, including Italian defender Giacomazzi, Carlo Tagnin, and Swiss forward Roger Vonlanthen.

Alessandria's coaches Robotti and Pedroni settled the team with a strong "catenaccio": the quality of the holding midfielder-line granted good matches, and for a long time the Grigi's occupied the first positions of the classification, even if they fell away in the last part of the championship, ending 12th.

In 1957–58 season Alessandria ended as the 3rd best defense in Serie A, with 42 goals against in 34 matches: only Internazionale and Fiorentina did it better.

Roger Vonlanthen, even though he scored only 8 goals (less than the expected), was the top goalscorer.

== Club ==
Management

- Chairman: Silvio Sacco
- Consulors: Amedeo Ruggiero and Remo Sacco
- Secretaries: Enrico Reposi and Piero Zorzoli

Coaching staff

- Coaches: Luciano Robotti and Franco Pedroni
- Fitness coach: De Sisti

Medical staff

- Team Doctor: Cesare Bruno
- Masseur: Eugenio Taverna

== Players ==
=== Transfers ===
==== In ====
—	GK	ITA	Natale Nobili (from Corbetta)
—	DF	ITA	Giovanni Giacomazzi (from Internazionale)
—	DF	ITA	Nello Stella (from youth team)
—	MF	ITA	Antonio Marcellini (from Roma)
—	MF	ITA	Giancarlo Pistorello (from Simmenthal Monza)
—	MF	ITA	Vittorino Regeni (from Saici Torviscosa)
—	MF	ITA	Marco Savioni (from Internazionale)
—	MF	ITA	Carlo Tagnin (from Simmenthal Monza)
—	FW	PER	Hugo Natteri (from Internazionale)
—	FW	SUI	Roger Vonlanthen (from Internazionale)

==== Out ====
—	DF	ITA	Bruno Bosio (to Pro Vercelli)
—	DF	ITA	Gian Luigi Brotto (to Sarom Ravenna)
—	MF	ITA	Egidio Morbello (to Roma)
—	MF	ITA	Franco Russi (to Pro Vercelli)
—	FW	ITA	Enrico Pratesi (to Sarom Ravenna)
—	FW	ITA	Luciano Redegalli (to Taranto)
—	FW	ITA	Giorgio Tinazzi (to Internazionale)

=== Profiles and statistics ===
Role	Player	Born	Apps	Goals	Apps	Goals
Role	Player	Born	Serie A		Total	
FW	(Italy) Lanfranco Albertelli	1926	4	0	4	0
DF	(Italy) Umberto Boniardi	1927	18	0	18	0
FW	(Italy) Ercole Castaldo	1926	30	3	30	3
GK	(Italy) Pacifico Cuman	1935	2	-5	2	-5
DF	(Italy) Giovanni Giacomazzi	1928	27	0	27	0
MF	(Italy) Antonio Girardo	1937	1	0	1	0
FW	(Italy) Michele Manenti	1928	16	4	16	4
MF	(Italy) Antonio Marcellini	1937	21	0	21	0
DF	(Italy) Aldo Nardi	1931	24	1	24	1
FW	(Peru) Hugo Natteri	1934	2	0	2	0
GK	(Italy) Natale Nobili	1935	15	-15	15	-15
DF	(Italy) Franco Pedroni	1926	24	0	24	0
MF	(Italy) Giancarlo Pistorello	1932	9	1	9	1
MF	(Italy) Vittorino Regeni	1938	1	0	1	0
MF	(Italy) Marco Savioni	1931	30	6	30	6
MF	(Italy) Cirano Snidero	1928	15	1	15	1
GK	(Italy) Ideo Stefani	1932	17	-22	17	-22
DF	(Italy) Nello Stella	1939	1	0	1	0
MF	(Italy) Carlo Tagnin	1932	29	3	29	3
DF	(Italy) Luigi Traverso	1934	32	3	32	3
MF	(Italy) Alessandro Vitali	1934	27	6	27	6
FW	(Switzerland) Roger Vonlanthen	1930	29	8	29	8

== Matches ==
=== Serie A ===
8 September 1957 1	Alessandria	1–0	Fiorentina	Alessandria
	Vitali 32'			Stadium: Stadio Giuseppe Moccagatta; Referee: Moriconi (Rome)

15 September 1957 2	Torino	0–0	Alessandria	Turin
				Stadium: Stadio Filadelfia; Referee: Famulari (Messina)

22 September 1957 3	Alessandria	0–0	Milan	Alessandria
				Stadium: Stadio Giuseppe Moccagatta; Referee: Lo Bello (Syracuse)

29 September 1957 4	Verona	3–0	Alessandria	Verona
	Maccacaro 13', 44'; Bassetti 71'			Stadium: Stadio Comunale; Referee: Rebuffo (Milan)

6 October 1957 5	Alessandria	4–0	Lazio	Alessandria
	Traverso 35'; Vonlanthen 57', 64'; Vitali 86'			Stadium: Stadio Giuseppe Moccagatta; Referee: Pieri (Trieste)

13 October 1957 6	Internazionale	1–1	Alessandria	Alessandria
	Tinazzi 88'		59' Vitali	Stadium: Stadio San Siro; Referee: Rigato (Venice)

20 October 1957 7	SPAL	3–2	Alessandria	Ferrara
	Vitali 1'; Mezzalira 17'; Sandell 30'		56' Savioni; 76' Tagnin	Stadium: Stadio Comunale; Referee: Steiner (Austria)

27 October 1957 8	Alessandria	2–0	Bologna	Alessandria
	Manenti 31', 58'			Stadium: Stadio Giuseppe Moccagatta; Referee: Campanati (Milan)

4 November 1957 9	Genoa	0–2	Alessandria	Genoa
			26', 88' Vonlanthen	Stadium: Stadio Luigi Ferraris; Referee: Menchini (Udine)

17 November 1957 11	Alessandria	2–1	Lanerossi Vicenza	Alessandria
	Tagnin 40'; Traverso 51'		24' Campana	Stadium: Stadio Giuseppe Moccagatta; Referee: Boati (Milan)

24 November 1957 12	Padova	2–1	Alessandria	Padua
	Chiumento 24', 65'		27' Traverso	Stadium: Stadio Silvio Appiani; Referee: Righi (Milan)

8 December 1957 13	Alessandria	2–0	Sampdoria	Alessandria
	Castaldo 8'; Tagnin 43' (pen.)			Stadium: Stadio Giuseppe Moccagatta; Referee: Marangio (Rome)

15 December 1957 14	Alessandria	1–3	Roma	Alessandria
	Savioni 19'		40' Pestrin; 52' da Costa; 71' Lojodice	Stadium: Stadio Giuseppe Moccagatta; Referee: Righi (Milan)

26 December 1957 10 (P)	Alessandria	0–0	Napoli	Alessandria
				Stadium: Stadio Giuseppe Moccagatta; Referee: Rigato (Venice)

29 December 1957 15	Atalanta	1–1	Alessandria	Bergamo
	Ronzon 38'		55' Manenti	Stadium: Stadio Comunale; Referee: Famulari (Messina)

1 January 1958 16	Alessandria	1–2	Juventus	Alessandria
	Castaldo 66'		3' Sivori; 35' (o.g.) Pedroni	Stadium: Stadio Giuseppe Moccagatta; Referee: Grill (Austria)

19 January 1958 17	Udinese	2–0	Alessandria	Udine
	Bettini 4'; Pentrelli 22'			Stadium: Stadio Moretti; Referee: Marchetti (Milan)

26 January 1958 18	Fiorentina	0–0	Alessandria	Florence
				Stadium: Stadio Comunale; Referee: Righi (Milan)

2 February 1958 19	Alessandria	0–0	Torino	Alessandria
				Stadium: Stadio Giuseppe Moccagatta; Referee: Orlandini (Rome)

9 February 1958 20	Milan	1–1	Alessandria	Milan
	Galli 64'		82' Savioni	Stadium: Stadio San Siro; Referee: Gambarotta (Genoa)

16 February 1958 21	Alessandria	3–1	Verona	Alessandria
	Vitali 21', 57'; Savioni 33'		82' Larini	Stadium: Stadio Giuseppe Moccagatta; Referee: Rebuffo (Milan)

23 February 1958 22	Lazio	2–1	Alessandria	Rome
	Moltrasio 21'; Muccinelli 90'		23' Manenti	Stadium: Stadio dei Centomila; Referee: Famulari (Messina)

2 March 1958 23	Alessandria	2–1	Internazionale	Alessandria
	Castaldo 21'; Vonlanthen 90'		72' Bicicli	Stadium: Stadio Giuseppe Moccagatta; Referee: Maurelli (Rome)

9 March 1958 24	Alessandria	0–0	SPAL	Alessandria
				Stadium: Stadio Giuseppe Moccagatta; Referee: Marchetti (Milan)

16 March 1958 25	Bologna	3–1	Alessandria	Bologna
	Pivatelli 10'; Pascutti 44', 48'		17' Vitali	Stadium: Stadio Comunale; Referee: Menchini (Udine)

30 March 1958 26	Alessandria	3–1	Genoa	Alessandria
	Nardi 30'; Snidero 73'; Vonlathen 85'		61' Barison	Stadium: Stadio Giuseppe Moccagatta; Referee: Jonni (Macerata)

6 April 1958 27	Napoli	4–1	Alessandria	Naples
	Brugola 8'; Pesaola 14'; Bertucco 33'; Morin 42'		85' Vonlanthen	Stadium: Stadio del Vomero; Referee: Bartolomei (Rome)

13 April 1958 28	Lanerossi Vicenza	4–0	Alessandria	Vicenza
	Marchi 32'; David 40'; Valentinuzzi 76'; Campana 82'			Stadium: Stadio Romeo Menti; Referee: Campanati (Milan)

20 April 1958 29	Alessandria	0–0	Padova	Alessandria
				Stadium: Stadio Giuseppe Moccagatta; Referee: Fornari (Bologna)

27 April 1958 30	Sampdoria	1–1	Alessandria	Genoa
	Ocwirk 76'		11' Vonlanthen	Stadium: Stadio Luigi Ferraris; Referee: Annoscia (Bari)

4 May 1958 31	Roma	2–1	Alessandria	Rome
	Orlando 37' da Costa 47'		88' Pistorello	Stadium: Stadio dei Centomila; Referee: Bruno De Marchi (Pordenone)

11 May 1958 32	Alessandria	0–0	Atalanta	Alessandria
				Stadium: Stadio Giuseppe Moccagatta; Referee: Jonni (Macerata)

18 May 1958 33	Juventus	2–1	Alessandria	Turin
	Montico 15'; Ferrario 82'		43' Savioni	Stadium: Stadio Comunale; Referee: Bartolomei (Rome)

25 May 1958 34	Alessandria	1–2	Udinese	Alessandria
	Savioni 73'		25' Fontanesi; 30' Piquè	Stadium: Stadio Giuseppe Moccagatta; Referee: Moriconi (Rome)

== Statistics ==
=== League table ===
Pos	Team	Pld	W	D	L	GF	GA	GD	Pts
12	Genoa	34	9	12	13	53	60	−7	30
12	Sampdoria	34	9	12	13	54	62	−8	30
12	Alessandria	34	9	12	13	36	42	−6	30
12	Lazio	34	10	10	14	45	65	−20	30
12	SPAL	34	10	10	14	32	52	−20	30

Source: Panini

=== Results by round ===
Round	1	2	3	4	5	6	7	8	9	10	11	12	13	14	15	16	17	18	19	20	21	22	23	24	25	26	27	28	29	30	31	32	33	34
Ground	H	A	H	A	H	A	A	H	A	H	H	A	H	H	A	H	A	A	H	A	H	A	H	H	A	H	A	A	H	A	A	H	A	H
Result	W	D	D	L	W	D	L	W	W	D	W	L	W	L	D	L	L	D	D	D	W	L	W	D	L	W	L	L	D	D	L	D	L	L
Position	1	3	3	8	4	4	5	5	5	5	4	5	5	6	6	7	8	6	7	8	7	8	7	6	7	6	6	7	8	8	10	9	10	12

Source: Standings
A = Away; H = Home; W = Win; D = Draw; L = Loss

=== Results summary ===
Overall								Home						Away					
Pld	W	D	L	GF	GA	GD	Pts	W	D	L	GF	GA	GD	W	D	L	GF	GA	GD
34	9	12	13	36	42	−6	39	8	6	3	22	11	+11	1	6	10	14	31	−17

Last updated: 17 March 2012.
Source: - Standings

== Sources ==
- Ugo Boccassi, Enrico Dericci, Marcello Marcellini. Alessandria U.S.: 60 anni. Milano, G.E.P., 1973.
- Marcello Marcellini. Giorni di grigio intenso. Campionato di Serie A 1957-58, la più bella Alessandria del dopoguerra. Alessandria, Litografia Viscardi, 2009.
- Mimma Caligaris. Grig100. Un secolo di Alessandria in cento partite. Il Piccolo, Alessandria, 2012.
- Fabrizio Melegari. Almanacco Illustrato del Calcio - La Storia 1898-2004. Panini Edizioni, Modena, September 2005.
