= 1954 FIFA World Cup Group 4 =

Football tournament group stage

Group 4 of the 1954 FIFA World Cup took place from 17 to 23 June 1954. The group consisted of Belgium, England, Italy, and Switzerland.

== Standings ==
Pos	Team	Pld	W	D	L	GF	GA	GD	Pts	Qualification
1	England	2	1	1	0	6	4	+2	3	Advance to the knockout stage
2	Switzerland	2	1	0	1	2	3	−1	2 (Note: Second place decided over through play-off: Switzerland 4–1 Italy)	Advance to the knockout stage
3	Italy	2	1	0	1	5	3	+2	2	
4	Belgium	2	0	1	1	5	8	−3	1	

Source: FIFA

== Matches ==
All times listed are local time (CET, UTC+1).

=== Switzerland vs Italy ===
17 June 1954
17:50

Switzerland	2–1	Italy
Ballaman 18'; Hügi 78'		Boniperti 44'

Stade Olympique de la Pontaise, Lausanne
Attendance: 43,000
Referee: Mário Vianna (Brazil)

Switzerland
Italy

GK	2	Eugène Parlier
DF	7	André Neury
DF	14	Willy Kernen
DF	5	Marcel Flückiger
MF	4	Roger Bocquet (c)
MF	9	Charles Casali
FW	16	Robert Ballaman
FW	22	Roger Vonlanthen
FW	18	Josef Hügi
FW	20	Eugen Meier
FW	17	Jacques Fatton
Manager:
(Austria) Karl Rappan

GK	1	Giorgio Ghezzi
DF	2	Guido Vincenzi
DF	3	Giovanni Giacomazzi
MF	4	Maino Neri
MF	5	Omero Tognon
MF	6	Fulvio Nesti
FW	7	Ermes Muccinelli
FW	19	Giampiero Boniperti (c)
FW	9	Carlo Galli
FW	8	Egisto Pandolfini
FW	11	Benito Lorenzi
Manager:
(Hungary) Lajos Czeizler

=== England vs Belgium ===
England looked set for victory when they led 3-1 early in the second half. But defensive lapses handed their opponents two simple goals, which took the game into extra time. Nat Lofthouse then edged England back in front before an unlucky headed own goal by Jimmy Dickinson handed the Belgians a draw.

17 June 1954
18:10

England	4–4 (a.e.t.)	Belgium
Broadis 26', 63'; Lofthouse 36', 91'		Anoul 5', 71'; Coppens 67'; Dickinson 94' (o.g.)

St. Jakob Stadium, Basel
Attendance: 14,000
Referee: Emil Schmetzer (West Germany)

England
Belgium

GK	1	Gil Merrick
RB	2	Ron Staniforth
LB	3	Roger Byrne
RH	4	Billy Wright (c)
CH	5	Syd Owen
LH	6	Jimmy Dickinson
OR	7	Stanley Matthews
IR	8	Ivor Broadis
CF	9	Nat Lofthouse
IL	10	Tommy Taylor
OL	11	Tom Finney
Manager:
(England) Walter Winterbottom

GK	1	Léopold Gernaey
DF	2	Marcel Dries
DF	3	Alfons Van Brandt
DF	4	Constant Huysmans
MF	5	Louis Carré
MF	6	Victor Mees
FW	11	Joseph Mermans (c)
FW	8	Denis Houf
FW	9	Henri Coppens
FW	10	Léopold Anoul
FW	16	Pieter van den Bosch
Manager:
(Scotland) Doug Livingstone

=== Italy vs Belgium ===
20 June 1954
17:00

Italy	4–1	Belgium
Pandolfini 41' (pen.); Galli 48'; Frignani 58'; Lorenzi 78'		Anoul 81'

Stadio di Cornaredo, Lugano
Attendance: 24,000
Referee: Carl Erich Steiner (Austria)

Italy
Belgium

GK	1	Giorgio Ghezzi
DF	13	Ardico Magnini
DF	3	Giovanni Giacomazzi
MF	4	Maino Neri
MF	5	Omero Tognon
MF	6	Fulvio Nesti
FW	21	Amleto Frignani
FW	10	Gino Cappello
FW	9	Carlo Galli
FW	8	Egisto Pandolfini (c)
FW	11	Benito Lorenzi
Manager:
(Hungary) Lajos Czeizler

GK	1	Léopold Gernaey
DF	2	Marcel Dries
DF	3	Alfons Van Brandt
DF	4	Constant Huysmans
MF	5	Louis Carré
MF	6	Victor Mees
FW	11	Joseph Mermans (c)
FW	10	Léopold Anoul
FW	9	Henri Coppens
FW	15	Hippolyte Van den Bosch
FW	16	Pieter van den Bosch
Manager:
(Scotland) Doug Livingstone

=== England vs Switzerland ===
20 June 1954
17:10

England	2–0	Switzerland
Mullen 43'; Wilshaw 69'

Wankdorfstadion, Bern
Attendance: 43,500
Referee: Istvan Zsolt (Hungary)

England
Switzerland

GK	1	Gil Merrick
RB	2	Ron Staniforth
LB	3	Roger Byrne
RH	14	Bill McGarry
CH	4	Billy Wright (c)
LH	6	Jimmy Dickinson
OR	11	Tom Finney
IR	8	Ivor Broadis
CF	10	Tommy Taylor
IL	15	Dennis Wilshaw
OL	17	Jimmy Mullen
Manager:
(England) Walter Winterbottom

GK	2	Eugène Parlier
DF	7	André Neury
DF	4	Roger Bocquet (c)
MF	14	Willy Kernen
MF	10	Oliver Eggimann
MF	8	Heinz Bigler
FW	20	Eugen Meier
FW	22	Roger Vonlanthen
FW	15	Charles Antenen
FW	16	Robert Ballaman
FW	17	Jacques Fatton
Manager:
(Austria) Karl Rappan

=== Play-off: Switzerland vs Italy ===
23 June 1954
18:00

Switzerland	4–1	Italy
Hügi 14', 85'; Ballaman 48'; Fatton 90'		Nesti 67'

St. Jakob Stadium, Basel
Attendance: 30,000
Referee: Benjamin Griffiths (Wales)

Switzerland
Italy

GK	2	Eugène Parlier
DF	7	André Neury
DF	4	Roger Bocquet (c)
MF	14	Willy Kernen
MF	10	Oliver Eggimann
MF	9	Charles Casali
FW	15	Charles Antenen
FW	22	Roger Vonlanthen
FW	18	Josef Hügi
FW	16	Robert Ballaman
FW	17	Jacques Fatton
Manager:
(Austria) Karl Rappan

GK	12	Giovanni Viola
DF	13	Ardico Magnini
DF	3	Giovanni Giacomazzi
MF	15	Giacomo Mari
MF	5	Omero Tognon
MF	6	Fulvio Nesti
FW	7	Ermes Muccinelli
FW	8	Egisto Pandolfini (c)
FW	11	Benito Lorenzi
FW	17	Armando Segato
FW	21	Amleto Frignani
Manager:
(Hungary) Lajos Czeizler

== See also ==
- Belgium at the FIFA World Cup
- England at the FIFA World Cup
- Italy at the FIFA World Cup
- Switzerland at the FIFA World Cup
