= Italy at the FIFA World Cup =

International football delegation

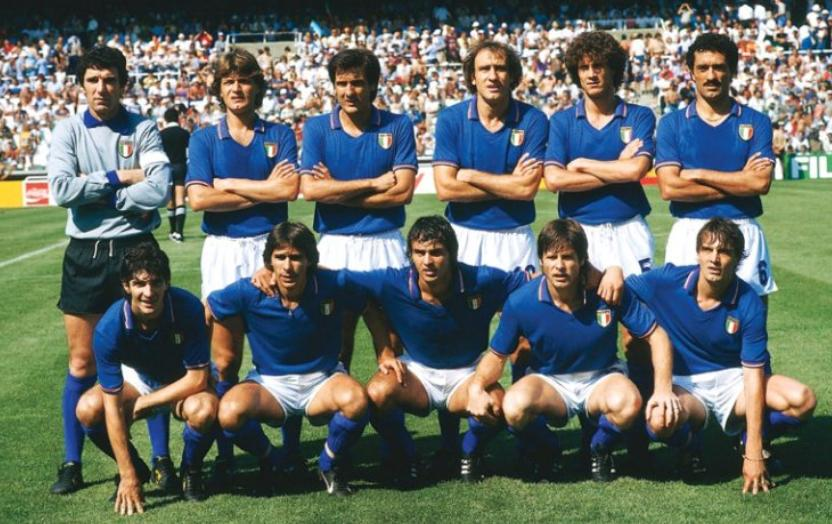
The Italy national team that won the 1982 FIFA World Cup in Spain.

Italy is one of the most successful national teams in the history of the FIFA World Cup, having won four titles (1934, 1938, 1982, 2006), just one fewer than Brazil. The team has been present in 18 out of the 23 tournaments, reaching six finals, a third place, and a fourth place.

== FIFA World Cup record ==
=== Overall record ===
Champions Runners-up Third place Fourth place

FIFA World Cup record									Qualification record					
Year	Round	Position	Pld	W	D*	L	GF	GA	Pld	W	D	L	GF	GA
(Uruguay) 1930	Did not enter								Did not enter					
(Italy) 1934	Champions	1st	5	4	1	0	12	3	1	1	0	0	4	0
(France) 1938	Champions	1st	4	4	0	0	11	5	Qualified as defending champions					
(Brazil) 1950	Group stage	7th	2	1	0	1	4	3	Qualified as defending champions					
(Switzerland) 1954	Group stage	10th	3	1	0	2	6	7	2	2	0	0	7	2
(Sweden) 1958	Did not qualify								4	2	0	2	5	5
(Chile) 1962	Group stage	9th	3	1	1	1	3	2	2	2	0	0	10	2
(England) 1966	Group stage	9th	3	1	0	2	2	2	6	4	1	1	17	3
(Mexico) 1970	Runners-up	2nd	6	3	2	1	10	8	4	3	1	0	10	3
(West Germany) 1974	Group stage	10th	3	1	1	1	5	4	6	4	2	0	12	0
(Argentina) 1978	Fourth place	4th	7	4	1	2	9	6	6	5	0	1	18	4
(Spain) 1982	Champions	1st	7	4	3	0	12	6	8	5	2	1	12	5
(Mexico) 1986	Round of 16	12th	4	1	2	1	5	6	Qualified as defending champions					
(Italy) 1990	Third place	3rd	7	6	1	0	10	2	Qualified as hosts					
(United States) 1994	Runners-up	2nd	7	4	2	1	8	5	10	7	2	1	22	7
(France) 1998	Quarter-finals	5th	5	3	2	0	8	3	10	6	4	0	13	2
(South Korea) (Japan) 2002	Round of 16	15th	4	1	1	2	5	5	8	6	2	0	16	3
(Germany) 2006	Champions	1st	7	5	2	0	12	2	10	7	2	1	17	8
(South Africa) 2010	Group stage	26th	3	0	2	1	4	5	10	7	3	0	18	7
(Brazil) 2014	Group stage	22nd	3	1	0	2	2	3	10	6	4	0	19	9
(Russia) 2018	Did not qualify								12	7	3	2	21	9
(Qatar) 2022	Did not qualify								9	4	4	1	13	3
(Canada) (Mexico) (United States) 2026	Did not qualify								10	7	1	2	24	13
(Morocco) (Portugal) (Spain) 2030	To be determined								To be determined					
(Saudi Arabia) 2034	To be determined								To be determined					
Total	4 titles	18/23	83	45	21	17	128	77	128	85	31	12	258	85

*Draws include knockout matches decided via penalty shoot-out

Italy's World Cup record
First Match	Italy 7–1 United States (27 May 1934; Rome, Italy)
Biggest Win	Italy 7–1 United States (27 May 1934; Rome, Italy)
Biggest Defeat	Switzerland 4–1 Italy (23 June 1954; Basel, Switzerland); Brazil 4–1 Italy (21 June 1970; Mexico City, Mexico)
Best Result	Champions in 1934, 1938, 1982, and 2006
Worst Result	Group stage in 1950, 1954, 1962, 1966, 1974, 2010 and 2014

=== Finals ===
Year	Manager	Captain	Italy scorers
1934	Vittorio Pozzo	Gianpiero Combi	Raimundo Orsi, Angelo Schiavio
1938	Vittorio Pozzo	Giuseppe Meazza	Gino Colaussi (2), Silvio Piola (2)
1970	Ferruccio Valcareggi	Giacinto Facchetti	Roberto Boninsegna
1982	Enzo Bearzot	Dino Zoff	Paolo Rossi, Marco Tardelli, Alessandro Altobelli
1994	Arrigo Sacchi	Franco Baresi	–
2006	Marcello Lippi	Fabio Cannavaro	Marco Materazzi

=== By match ===
World Cup	Round	Opponent	Score	Venue	Italy scorers
1934	Round of 16	United States	7–1	Rome	Schiavio (3), Orsi (2), Ferrari, Meazza
1934	Quarter-finals	Spain	1–1 (a.e.t.)	Florence	Ferrari
1934	Quarter-finals	Spain	1–0	Florence	Meazza
1934	Semi-finals	Austria	1–0	Milan	Guaita
1934	Final	Czechoslovakia	2–1 (a.e.t.)	Rome	Orsi, Schiavio
1938	Round of 16	Norway	2–1 (a.e.t.)	Marseille	Ferraris, Piola
1938	Quarter-finals	France	3–1	Paris	Piola (2), Colaussi
1938	Semi-finals	Brazil	2–1	Marseille	Colaussi, Meazza
1938	Final	Hungary	4–2	Paris	Colaussi (2), Piola (2)
1950	Group 3	Sweden	2–3	São Paulo	Carapellese, Muccinelli
1950	Group 3	Paraguay	2–0	São Paulo	Carapellese, Pandolfini
1954	Group 4	Switzerland	1–2	Lausanne	Boniperti
1954	Group 4	Belgium	4–1	Lugano	Pandolfini, Galli, Frignani, Lorenzi
1954	Play-off	Switzerland	1–4	Basel	Nesti
1962	Group 2	West Germany	0–0	Santiago	—
1962	Group 2	Chile	0–2	Santiago	—
1962	Group 2	Switzerland	3–0	Santiago	Bulgarelli (2), Mora
1966	Group 4	Chile	2–0	Sunderland	A. Mazzola, Barison
1966	Group 4	Soviet Union	0–1	Sunderland	—
1966	Group 4	North Korea	0–1	Middlesbrough	—
1970	Group 2	Sweden	1–0	Toluca	Domenghini
1970	Group 2	Uruguay	0–0	Puebla	—
1970	Group 2	Israel	0–0	Toluca	—
1970	Quarter-finals	Mexico	4–1	Toluca	Riva (2), Guzmán (o.g.), Rivera
1970	Semi-finals	West Germany	4–3 (a.e.t.)	Mexico City	Boninsegna, Burgnich, Riva, Rivera
1970	Final	Brazil	1–4	Mexico City	Boninsegna
1974	Group 4	Haiti	3–1	Munich	Rivera, Benetti, Anastasi
1974	Group 4	Argentina	1–1	Stuttgart	Perfumo (o.g.)
1974	Group 4	Poland	1–2	Stuttgart	Capello
1978	Group 1	France	2–1	Mar del Plata	Rossi, Zaccarelli
1978	Group 1	Hungary	3–1	Mar del Plata	Rossi, Bettega, Benetti
1978	Group 1	Argentina	1–0	Buenos Aires	Bettega
1978	Group A	West Germany	0–0	Buenos Aires	—
1978	Group A	Austria	1–0	Buenos Aires	Rossi
1978	Group A	Netherlands	1–2	Buenos Aires	Brandts (o.g.)
1978	Match for third place	Brazil	1–2	Buenos Aires	Causio
1982	Group 1	Poland	0–0	Vigo	—
1982	Group 1	Peru	1–1	Vigo	Conti
1982	Group 1	Cameroon	1–1	Vigo	Graziani
1982	Group C	Argentina	2–1	Barcelona	Tardelli, Cabrini
1982	Group C	Brazil	3–2	Barcelona	Rossi (3)
1982	Semi-finals	Poland	2–0	Barcelona	Rossi (2)
1982	Final	West Germany	3–1	Madrid	Rossi, Tardelli, Altobelli
1986	Group A	Bulgaria	1–1	Mexico City	Altobelli
1986	Group A	Argentina	1–1	Puebla	Altobelli
1986	Group A	South Korea	3–2	Puebla	Altobelli (2), Cho Kwang-rae (o.g.)
1986	Round of 16	France	0–2	Mexico City	—
1990	Group A	Austria	1–0	Rome	Schillaci
1990	Group A	United States	1–0	Rome	Giannini
1990	Group A	Czechoslovakia	2–0	Rome	Schillaci, R. Baggio
1990	Round of 16	Uruguay	2–0	Rome	Schillaci, Serena
1990	Quarter-finals	Republic of Ireland	1–0	Rome	Schillaci
1990	Semi-finals	Argentina	1–1 (a.e.t.) (3–4 p)	Naples	Schillaci
1990	Match for third place	England	2–1	Bari	R. Baggio, Schillaci
1994	Group E	Republic of Ireland	0–1	East Rutherford	—
1994	Group E	Norway	1–0	East Rutherford	D. Baggio
1994	Group E	Mexico	1–1	Washington, D.C.	Massaro
1994	Round of 16	Nigeria	2–1 (a.e.t.)	Foxborough	R. Baggio (2)
1994	Quarter-finals	Spain	2–1	Foxborough	D. Baggio, R. Baggio
1994	Semi-finals	Bulgaria	2–1	East Rutherford	R. Baggio (2)
1994	Final	Brazil	0–0 (a.e.t.) (2–3 p)	Pasadena	—
1998	Group B	Chile	2–2	Bordeaux	Vieri, R. Baggio
1998	Group B	Cameroon	3–0	Montpellier	Vieri (2), Di Biagio
1998	Group B	Austria	2–1	Saint-Denis	Vieri, R. Baggio
1998	Round of 16	Norway	1–0	Marseille	Vieri
1998	Quarter-finals	France	0–0 (a.e.t.) (3–4 p)	Saint-Denis	—
2002	Group G	Ecuador	2–0	Sapporo	Vieri (2)
2002	Group G	Croatia	1–2	Ibaraki	Vieri
2002	Group G	Mexico	1–1	Ōita	Del Piero
2002	Round of 16	South Korea	1–2 (a.s.d.e.t.)	Daejeon	Vieri
2006	Group E	Ghana	2–0	Hanover	Pirlo, Iaquinta
2006	Group E	United States	1–1	Kaiserslautern	Gilardino
2006	Group E	Czech Republic	2–0	Hamburg	Materazzi, Inzaghi
2006	Round of 16	Australia	1–0	Kaiserslautern	Totti
2006	Quarter-finals	Ukraine	3–0	Hamburg	Toni (2), Zambrotta
2006	Semi-finals	Germany	2–0 (a.e.t.)	Dortmund	Grosso, Del Piero
2006	Final	France	1–1 (a.e.t.) (5–3 p)	Berlin	Materazzi
2010	Group F	Paraguay	1–1	Cape Town	De Rossi
2010	Group F	New Zealand	1–1	Nelspruit	Iaquinta
2010	Group F	Slovakia	2–3	Johannesburg	Di Natale, Quagliarella
2014	Group D	England	2–1	Manaus	Marchisio, Balotelli
2014	Group D	Costa Rica	0–1	Recife	—
2014	Group D	Uruguay	0–1	Natal	—

=== By opponent ===
FIFA World Cup matches (by opponent)
Opponent	Pld	W	D	L	GF	GA
Argentina	5	2	3	0	6	4
Australia	1	1	0	0	1	0
Austria	4	4	0	0	5	1
Belgium	1	1	0	0	4	1
Brazil	5	2	1	2	7	9
Bulgaria	2	1	1	0	3	2
Cameroon	2	1	1	0	4	1
Chile	3	1	1	1	4	4
Costa Rica	1	0	0	1	0	1
Croatia	1	0	0	1	1	2
Czech Republic	1	1	0	0	2	0
Czechoslovakia	2	2	0	0	4	1
Ecuador	1	1	0	0	2	0
England	2	2	0	0	4	2
France	5	2	2	1	6	5
Germany (Note: Includes appearances as West Germany)	5	3	2	0	9	4
Ghana	1	1	0	0	2	0
Haiti	1	1	0	0	3	1
Hungary	2	2	0	0	7	3
Israel	1	0	1	0	0	0
Mexico	3	1	2	0	6	3
Netherlands	1	0	0	1	1	2
New Zealand	1	0	1	0	1	1
Nigeria	1	1	0	0	2	1
North Korea	1	0	0	1	0	1
Norway	3	3	0	0	4	1
Paraguay	2	1	1	0	3	1
Peru	1	0	1	0	1	1
Poland	3	1	1	1	3	2
Republic of Ireland	2	1	0	1	1	1
Slovakia	1	0	0	1	2	3
South Korea	2	1	0	1	4	4
Soviet Union	1	0	0	1	0	1
Spain	3	2	1	0	4	2
Sweden	2	1	0	1	3	3
Switzerland	3	1	0	2	5	6
Ukraine	1	1	0	0	3	0
United States	3	2	1	0	9	2
Uruguay	3	1	1	1	2	1

== World Cup Finals ==
=== 1934 v Czechoslovakia ===
With temperatures around 40 °C (104 °F), Italy won their home tournament in 1934 after going into extra time against Czechoslovakia.

10 June 1934
17:00 CEST

Italy	2–1 (a.e.t.)	Czechoslovakia
Orsi 81'; Schiavio 95'	Report	Puč 71'

Stadio Nazionale PNF, Rome
Attendance: 55,000
Referee: Ivan Eklind (Sweden)

GK	Gianpiero Combi (c)
RB	Eraldo Monzeglio
LB	Luigi Allemandi
RH	Attilio Ferraris
CH	Luis Monti
LH	Luigi Bertolini
OR	Enrique Guaita
IR	Giuseppe Meazza
IL	Giovanni Ferrari
OL	Raimundo Orsi
CF	Angelo Schiavio
Manager:
Vittorio Pozzo

GK	František Plánička (c)
RB	Josef Čtyřoký
LB	Ladislav Ženíšek
RH	Rudolf Krčil
CH	Štefan Čambal
LH	Josef Košťálek
OR	Antonín Puč
IR	Oldřich Nejedlý
IL	František Svoboda
OL	František Junek
CF	Jiří Sobotka
Manager:
Karel Petrů

=== 1938 v Hungary ===
After a difficult route to the final, defeating hosts France in the quarter-finals and Brazil in the semis, Italy was the first team to win the World Cup title on foreign ground. Also, it was the first of only two times in World Cup history that a team successfully defended their title.

19 June 1938
17:00 (WEST)

Italy	4–2	Hungary
Colaussi 6', 35'; Piola 16', 82'	Report	Titkos 8'; G. Sárosi 70'

Stade Olympique de Colombes, Paris
Attendance: 45,000
Referee: Georges Capdeville (France)

GK	Aldo Olivieri
RB	Alfredo Foni
LB	Pietro Rava
RH	Pietro Serantoni
LH	Ugo Locatelli
CH	Michele Andreolo
IR	Giuseppe Meazza (c)
IL	Giovanni Ferrari
OR	Amedeo Biavati
CF	Silvio Piola
OL	Gino Colaussi
Manager:
Vittorio Pozzo

GK	Antal Szabó
RB	Sándor Bíró
LB	Gyula Polgár
RH	Gyula Lázár
LH	Antal Szalay
CH	György Szűcs
IR	Gyula Zsengellér
IL	Jenő Vincze
OR	Pál Titkos
CF	György Sárosi (c)
OL	Ferenc Sas
Manager:
Alfréd Schaffer

=== 1970 v Brazil ===
In 1970, the Brazilian team featured superstars including Pelé, Rivellino, Jairzinho and Carlos Alberto, and were considered favourites for the title. Particularly in the second half of the final, Italy was outclassed by Brazil's passing play.

21 June 1970
12:00 UTC−6

Brazil	4–1	Italy
Pelé 18'; Gérson 66'; Jairzinho 71'; Carlos Alberto 86'	Report	Boninsegna 37'

Estadio Azteca, Mexico City
Attendance: 107,412
Referee: Rudi Glöckner (West Germany)

GK	1	Félix
DF	4	Carlos Alberto (c)
DF	2	Brito
DF	3	Piazza
DF	16	Everaldo
MF	5	Clodoaldo
MF	8	Gérson
FW	7	Jairzinho
FW	9	Tostão
FW	10	Pelé
FW	11	Rivellino	(yellow card) 45'
Manager:
Mário Zagallo

GK	1	Enrico Albertosi
DF	2	Tarcisio Burgnich	(yellow card) 27'
DF	5	Pierluigi Cera
DF	8	Roberto Rosato
DF	3	Giacinto Facchetti (c)
MF	10	Mario Bertini		(substituted off) 75'
MF	13	Angelo Domenghini
MF	16	Giancarlo De Sisti
FW	15	Sandro Mazzola
FW	11	Gigi Riva
FW	20	Roberto Boninsegna		(substituted off) 84'
Substitutions:
MF	18	Antonio Juliano		(substituted on) 75'
MF	14	Gianni Rivera		(substituted on) 84'
Manager:
Ferruccio Valcareggi

=== 1982 v West Germany ===
Italy recorded three draws in the first group stage in a worrisome start to the tournament, proceeding ahead of Cameroon only on number of goals scored. However, the Italians went on to defeat Brazil, Argentina and a strong Polish side over the course of the tournament before facing West Germany in the final in Madrid.

Antonio Cabrini missed a penalty for Italy in the goalless first half, but the dominant Italian side eventually built up a 3–0 lead and won the match 3–1, securing their third World Cup title.

11 July 1982
20:00 CEST

Italy	3–1	West Germany
Rossi 57'; Tardelli 69'; Altobelli 81'	Report	Breitner 83'

Santiago Bernabéu, Madrid
Attendance: 90,000
Referee: Arnaldo Cézar Coelho (Brazil)

GK	1	Dino Zoff (c)
SW	7	Gaetano Scirea
CB	6	Claudio Gentile
CB	5	Fulvio Collovati
RWB	3	Giuseppe Bergomi
LWB	4	Antonio Cabrini
DM	13	Gabriele Oriali	(yellow card) 73'
RM	16	Bruno Conti	(yellow card) 31'
CM	14	Marco Tardelli
LW	19	Francesco Graziani		(substituted off) 7'
CF	20	Paolo Rossi
Substitutions:
FW	18	Alessandro Altobelli		(substituted on) 7'	(substituted off) 89'
MF	15	Franco Causio			(substituted on) 89'
Manager:
Enzo Bearzot

GK	1	Harald Schumacher
SW	15	Uli Stielike	(yellow card) 73'
RB	20	Manfred Kaltz
CB	4	Karlheinz Förster
LB	5	Bernd Förster
RM	6	Wolfgang Dremmler	(yellow card) 61'	(substituted off) 62'
CM	3	Paul Breitner
LM	2	Hans-Peter Briegel
RW	11	Karl-Heinz Rummenigge (c)		(substituted off) 70'
LW	7	Pierre Littbarski	(yellow card) 88'
CF	8	Klaus Fischer
Substitutions:
FW	9	Horst Hrubesch		(substituted on) 62'
MF	10	Hansi Müller		(substituted on) 70'
Manager:
Jupp Derwall

=== 1994 v Brazil ===
The 1994 final was the first ever to be decided on penalties after a goalless 120 minutes. Italian captain Franco Baresi missed the very first penalty, and Roberto Baggio the decisive last one.

Italy became the first team to lose two World Cup finals against the same opponent.

17 July 1994
12:30 PDT

Brazil	0–0 (a.e.t.)	Italy
	Report
Penalties
Márcio Santos (penalty missed); Romário (penalty scored); Branco (penalty scored); Dunga (penalty scored)	3–2	(penalty missed) Baresi; (penalty scored) Albertini; (penalty scored) Evani; (penalty missed) Massaro; (penalty missed) R. Baggio

Rose Bowl, Pasadena
Attendance: 94,194
Referee: Sándor Puhl (Hungary)

GK	1	Cláudio Taffarel
RB	2	Jorginho		(substituted off) 21'
CB	13	Aldair
CB	15	Márcio Santos
LB	6	Branco
CM	5	Mauro Silva
CM	8	Dunga (c)
AM	17	Mazinho	(yellow card) 4'
AM	9	Zinho		(substituted off) 106'
CF	11	Romário
CF	7	Bebeto
Substitutions:
DF	14	Cafu	(yellow card) 87'	(substituted on) 21'
FW	21	Viola		(substituted on) 106'
Manager:
Carlos Alberto Parreira

GK	1	Gianluca Pagliuca
RB	8	Roberto Mussi		(substituted off) 35'
CB	6	Franco Baresi (c)
CB	5	Paolo Maldini
LB	3	Antonio Benarrivo
RM	14	Nicola Berti
CM	13	Dino Baggio		(substituted off) 95'
CM	11	Demetrio Albertini	(yellow card) 42'
LM	16	Roberto Donadoni
CF	10	Roberto Baggio
CF	19	Daniele Massaro
Substitutes:
DF	2	Luigi Apolloni	(yellow card) 41'	(substituted on) 35'
MF	17	Alberigo Evani		(substituted on) 95'
Manager:
Arrigo Sacchi

=== 2006 v France ===
Italian defender Marco Materazzi was involved in all three outstanding moments of the first 120 minutes: he conceded the penalty that was converted by Zinedine Zidane early in the match, equalised with a powerful header soon after, and provoked Zidane in a manner that lead to the French captain being sent off. He also scored in the penalty shoot-out that was to follow.

It was only the second time a World Cup final was decided on penalties, again involving Italy after the 1994 final loss to Brazil.

9 July 2006
20:00

Italy	1–1 (a.e.t.)	France
Materazzi 19'	Report	Zidane 7' (pen.)
Penalties
Pirlo (penalty scored); Materazzi (penalty scored); De Rossi (penalty scored); Del Piero (penalty scored); Grosso (penalty scored)	5–3	(penalty scored) Wiltord; (penalty missed) Trezeguet; (penalty scored) Abidal; (penalty scored) Sagnol

Olympiastadion, Berlin
Attendance: 69,000
Referee: Horacio Elizondo (Argentina)

GK	1	Gianluigi Buffon
RB	19	Gianluca Zambrotta	(yellow card) 5'
CB	5	Fabio Cannavaro (c)
CB	23	Marco Materazzi
LB	3	Fabio Grosso
RM	16	Mauro Camoranesi		(substituted off) 86'
CM	8	Gennaro Gattuso
CM	21	Andrea Pirlo
LM	20	Simone Perrotta		(substituted off) 61'
SS	10	Francesco Totti		(substituted off) 61'
CF	9	Luca Toni
Substitutions:
MF	4	Daniele De Rossi		(substituted on) 61'
FW	15	Vincenzo Iaquinta		(substituted on) 61'
FW	7	Alessandro Del Piero		(substituted on) 86'
Manager:
Marcello Lippi

GK	16	Fabien Barthez
RB	19	Willy Sagnol	(yellow card) 12'
CB	15	Lilian Thuram
CB	5	William Gallas
LB	3	Eric Abidal
CM	4	Patrick Vieira		(substituted off) 56'
CM	6	Claude Makélélé	(yellow card) 76'
RW	22	Franck Ribéry		(substituted off) 100'
AM	10	Zinedine Zidane (c)	(red card) 110'
LW	7	Florent Malouda	(yellow card) 111'
CF	12	Thierry Henry		(substituted off) 107'
Substitutions:
MF	18	Alou Diarra		(substituted on) 56'
FW	20	David Trezeguet		(substituted on) 100'
FW	11	Sylvain Wiltord		(substituted on) 107'
Manager:
Raymond Domenech

== Player records ==
=== Most appearances ===
Despite playing in a record 23 FIFA World Cup matches across four tournaments for Italy, Paolo Maldini never lifted the trophy. Goalkeeper Gianluigi Buffon is the only Italian player to have been part of five World Cup squads, although he only made an appearance in four.

Rank	Player	Matches	World Cups
1	Paolo Maldini	23	1990, 1994, 1998 and 2002
2	Antonio Cabrini	18	1978, 1982 and 1986
2	Gaetano Scirea	18	1978, 1982 and 1986
2	Fabio Cannavaro	18	1998, 2002, 2006 and 2010
5	Dino Zoff	17	1974, 1978 and 1982
6	Giuseppe Bergomi	16	1982, 1986, 1990 and 1998
6	Roberto Baggio	16	1990, 1994 and 1998
8	Paolo Rossi	14	1978 and 1982
8	Gianluigi Buffon	14	1998, 2002, 2006, 2010 and 2014
10	Claudio Gentile	13	1978 and 1982
10	Marco Tardelli	13	1978 and 1982
10	Gianluca Zambrotta	13	2002, 2006 and 2010

=== Top goalscorers ===
Two Italians were awarded the Golden Boot for top goalscorer at a FIFA World Cup: Paolo Rossi in 1982 and Salvatore Schillaci in 1990, with both having six goals.

Rank	Player	Goals	World Cups
1	Paolo Rossi	9	1978 (3) and 1982 (6)
1	Roberto Baggio	9	1990 (2), 1994 (5) and 1998 (2)
1	Christian Vieri	9	1998 (5) and 2002 (4)
4	Salvatore Schillaci	6	1990
5	Silvio Piola	5	1938
5	Alessandro Altobelli	5	1982 (1) and 1986 (4)
7	Angelo Schiavio	4	1934
7	Gino Colaussi	4	1938
9	Raimundo Orsi	3	1934
9	Giuseppe Meazza	3	1934 (2) and 1938 (1)
9	Gigi Riva	3	1970
9	Gianni Rivera	3	1970 (2) and 1974 (1)

== Awards ==
=== Team ===
- (gold) Champions (4): 1934, 1938, 1982, 2006
- (silver) Runners-up (2): 1970, 1994
- (bronze) Third place (1): 1990

=== Individual ===
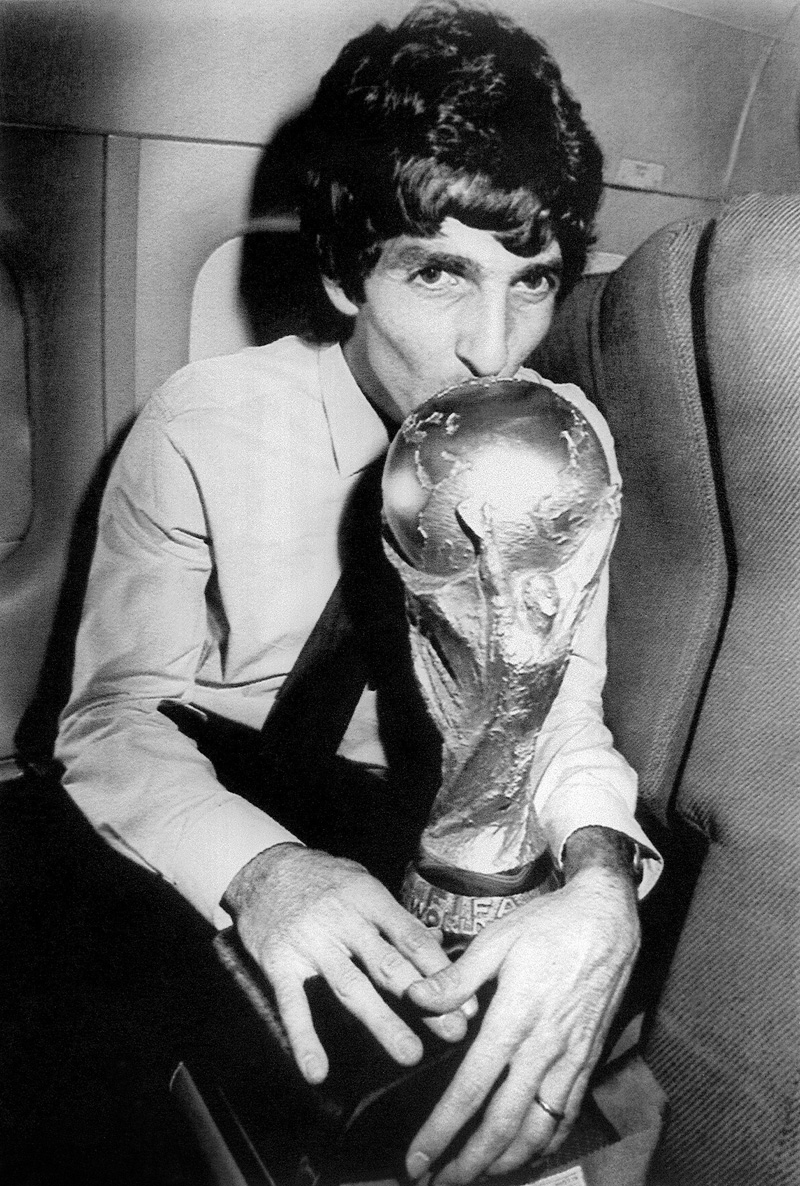
Italy's Paolo Rossi won the 1982 World Cup as the top scorer and was named player of the tournament.

Golden Ball award

- Golden Ball:
  - Giuseppe Meazza (1934; unofficial)
  - Paolo Rossi (1982)
  - Salvatore Schillaci (1990)
- Silver Ball:
  - Silvio Piola (1938; unofficial)
  - Paolo Rossi (1978; unofficial)
  - Roberto Baggio (1994)
  - Fabio Cannavaro (2006)
- Bronze Ball:
  - Andrea Pirlo (2006)

Golden Boot award

- Golden Boot:
  - Paolo Rossi (1982)
  - Salvatore Schillaci (1990)
- Silver Boot:
  - Angelo Schiavio (1934; retrospective)
  - Silvio Piola (1938; retrospective)
  - Christian Vieri (1998)

Golden Glove award

- Gianluigi Buffon (2006)

Best Young Player award

- Antonio Cabrini (1978)

Other individual awards

- World Cup final Player of the Match: Andrea Pirlo (2006)

== Refereeing ==
Three World Cup finals have been officiated by representatives of the Italian football federation, only English referees have had the honour more often (four times). The 1978 final between Argentina and the Netherlands has been led by Sergio Gonella, who had already officiated the European Championship final two years earlier. The other referees are Pierluigi Collina in 2002, and Nicola Rizzoli in 2014.

The Italian referee with the most World Cup matches, however, is Roberto Rosetti, who has been in charge of six matches total in 2006 and 2010.

== See also ==
- Italy at the FIFA Confederations Cup
- Italy at the UEFA European Championship
