= Marcellini =

Marcellini is an Italian surname. It may refer to

- Antonio Marcellini (1937–2010), Italian football player
- Luciana Marcellini (born 1948), Italian swimmer
- Paolo Marcellini (born 1947), Italian mathematician
- Romolo Marcellini (1910–1999), Italian film director and screenwriter
- Siro Marcellini (born 1921– unknown), Italian film director
