= Maroni (name) =

Maroni is a surname and a masculine given name. People with the surname include:

== People ==
=== Surname ===
- Enriqueta Maroni (1927–2025), Argentine human rights activist
- Gonzalo Maroni (born 1999), Argentine football player
- James Maroni (1873–1957), Norwegian theologian and priest
- Pablo Maroni (born 1695), Jesuit missionary to the Viceroyalty of Peru
- Roberto Maroni (1955–2022), Italian politician
- Rodrigo Maroni (born 1981), Brazilian politician

=== Given name ===
- Maroni Kumazawa (1895–1958), Japanese photographer

== Fictional characters ==
- Sal Maroni, Gotham character

== See also ==
- Maroni, disambiguation page
