= Huberty =

Huberty is a surname. Notable people with the surname include:

- Dan Huberty (born 1968), American businessman and politician
- Ernst Huberty (1927–2023), German sports journalist
- James Huberty, perpetrator of the 1984 San Ysidro McDonald's massacre, in San Diego, U.S.

== See also ==
- Hubert
