= Wiltrud =

Wiltrud is a feminine German given name. Notable people with the name include:

- Wiltrud Drexel (born 1950), Austrian alpine skier
- Wiltrud Probst (born 1969), German tennis player
- Wiltrud Urselmann (born 1942), German swimmer
