= Swimming at the 1960 Summer Olympics – Women's 200 metre breaststroke =

Women's 200 metre breaststroke at the Games of the XVII Olympiad
- Venue: Stadio Olimpico del Nuoto
- Date: 26 August 1960 (heats); 27 August 1960 (final)
- Competitors: 30 from 19 nations
- Winning time: 2:49.5 WR

Medalists
1st place, gold medalist(s)		Anita Lonsbrough	Great Britain
2nd place, silver medalist(s)		Wiltrud Urselmann	United Team of Germany
3rd place, bronze medalist(s)		Barbara Göbel	United Team of Germany

The women's 200 metre breaststroke event, included in the swimming competition at the 1960 Summer Olympics, took place on August 26–27, at the Stadio Olimpico del Nuoto. In this event, swimmers covered four lengths of the 50-metre (160 ft) Olympic-sized pool employing the breaststroke. It was the eighth appearance of the event, which first appeared at the 1924 Summer Olympics in Paris. A total of 30 competitors from 19 nations participated in the event. British gold-medalist Anita Lonsbrough became the first swimmer to break the world record in this event, with a time of 2:49.5 in the final.

== Records ==
Prior to this competition, the existing world and Olympic records were:

World record	Wiltrud Urselmann (FRG)	2:50.2 s	Aachen, West Germany	6 June 1960
Olympic record	Ursula Happe (EUA)	2:53.1 s	Melbourne, Australia	30 November 1956

The following records were established during the competition:

Date	Round	Name	Nationality	Time	OR	WR
August 26	Heat 2	Anita Lonsbrough	Great Britain	2:53.3	OR	
August 26	Heat 3	Wiltrud Urselmann	United Team of Germany	2:52.0	OR	
August 27	Final	Anita Lonsbrough	Great Britain	2:49.5	OR	WR

== Results ==
=== Heats ===
Rank	Heat	Lane	Name	Nationality	Time	Notes
1	3	4	Wiltrud Urselmann	United Team of Germany	2:52.0	Q, OR
2	2	4	Anita Lonsbrough	Great Britain	2:53.3	Q, OR
3	4	5	Ada den Haan	Netherlands	2:54.0	Q
4	1	4	Barbara Göbel	United Team of Germany	2:54.2	Q
5	3	5	Gretta Kok	Netherlands	2:55.2	Q
6	3	2	Patty Kempner	United States	2:55.5	Q
7	3	6	Dorrit Kristensen	Denmark	2:56.2	Q
8	4	4	Anne Warner	United States	2:56.3	Q
9	3	3	Christine Gosden	Great Britain	2:56.9	
10	4	7	Elena Zennaro	Italy	2:57.0	
11	1	3	Rosemary Lassig	Australia	2:57.4	
12	1	5	Yoshiko Takamatsu	Japan	2:57.6	
13	2	5	Klára Killermann	Hungary	2:58.7	
14	2	3	Barbro Eriksson	Sweden	2:59.8	
15	4	6	Inge Andersen	Denmark	2:59.9	
16	4	2	Janet Hogan	Australia	3:00.3	
17	2	6	Amélie Mirkowitch	France	3:01.5	
18	4	3	Marta Kadlecová	Czechoslovakia	3:01.7	
19	1	2	Michèle Pialat	France	3:02.2	
20	2	2	Christl Filippovits	Austria	3:02.6	
21	2	7	Lyudmila Korobova	Soviet Union	3:02.7	
22	1	6	Eve Maurer	Soviet Union	3:03.1	
23	1	1	Meg Miners	Rhodesia	3:05.2	
24	3	7	Judith McHale	Canada	3:07.7	
25	1	7	Christl Wöber	Austria	3:09.3	
26	2	1	Luciana Marcellini	Italy	3:09.8	
27	1	8	Maya Hungerbühler	Switzerland	3:10.1	
28	3	8	Isabel Castañe	Spain	3:10.4	
29	4	1	Regina Veloso	Portugal	3:13.3	
30	3	1	Suzette Schmidlin	Switzerland	—	DNS

=== Final ===
Rank	Lane	Name	Nationality	Time	Notes
1st place, gold medalist(s)	5	Anita Lonsbrough	Great Britain	2:49.5	WR
2nd place, silver medalist(s)	4	Wiltrud Urselmann	United Team of Germany	2:50.0	
3rd place, bronze medalist(s)	6	Barbara Göbel	United Team of Germany	2:53.6	
4	3	Ada den Haan	Netherlands	2:54.4	
5	2	Gretta Kok	Netherlands	2:54.6	
6	8	Anne Warner	United States	2:55.4	
7	7	Patty Kempner	United States	2:55.5	
8	1	Dorrit Kristensen	Denmark	2:55.7	

== Sources ==
- "The Games of the XVII Olympiad Rome 1960" (PDF). Volume Two, Part 2. Organizing Committee of the Games of the XVII Olympiad Rome. 1960.
- "LCM Women Records" (PDF). USA Swimming. 9 May 2012. p. 15.
- "Swimming at the 1960 Rome Summer Games: Women's 200 metres Breaststroke". Olympics at Sports-Reference.com. Sports Reference, LLC. Archived from the original on 17 April 2020.
