= Wöber =

Wöber (Woeber) and Wober are German surnames. Wöber is a phonetic variant of Weber. Wober may be a spelling of Wöber or a separate surname of Lower Sorbian origin. Notable people with the surname include:

- Maximilian Wöber (born 1998), Austrian footballer
- Christl Wöber, Austrian swimmer
- Hilali Wober (1939–2023), English rower
- Rudolf Wöber, Austrian long-distance runner
