= Maroni =

Maroni may refer to:

- Maroni (river), a river in South America
- Maroni, Cyprus, a village in Cyprus
- Maroni (name), list of people with the name
- Neoepimorius maroni, species of moth
- Papilio maroni, species of butterfly
- Saint-Laurent-du-Maroni, commune in French Guiana

== See also ==
- Moroni (disambiguation)
