= Fabrizio Poletti =

Italian footballer (born 1943)

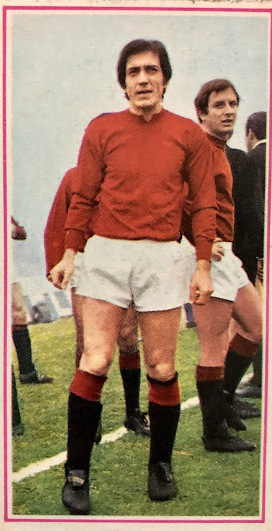
- Poletti in the 1970–71 Torino F.C. season

Personal information
- Date of birth: 13 July 1943
- Place of birth: Bondeno, Italy
- Height: 1.74 m (5 ft 9 in)
- Position: Full-back

Youth career
- 1957–1961: Bondenese

Senior career*
| Years | Team | Apps | (Gls) |
| 1961–1962 | Asti | 24 | (2) |
| 1962–1971 | Torino | 224 | (18) |
| 1971–1974 | Cagliari | 64 | (1) |
| 1974–1975 | Sampdoria | 5 | (0) |
| Total | | 317 | (21) |

International career
| 1963 | Italy U21 | | |
| 1965–1970 | Italy | 6 | (0) |

Managerial career
- 1978: Suzzara
- 1987–1988: Faenza
Medal record
Representing Italy
Men's Football
FIFA World Cup
| Runner-up | 1970 Mexico |
- * Club domestic league appearances and goals

Fabrizio Poletti (Italian pronunciation: [faˈbrittsjo poˈletti]; born 13 July 1943) is an Italian former football manager and player who played as a full-back.

He is remembered for his career with Torino, where he played for nine seasons, and won the Coppa Italia twice. He also represented the Italy national team, and was a member of the squad that reached the final of the 1970 FIFA World Cup.

== Club career ==
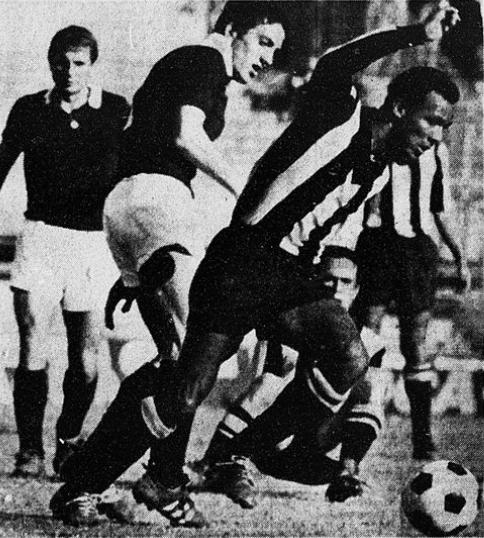
Poletti tackling Alberto Spencer

Born in Bondeno, in the province of Ferrara, Emilia-Romagna, Poletti is mainly remembered for his lengthy spell with Serie A club Torino (1962–71), after joining the club in 1962, at the age of 18, winning two Coppa Italia titles during his time with the club (during the 1967–68 and 1970–71 seasons). After being acquired by the senior team during the 1960–61 season, but not making any appearances, at the beginning of his club career, Poletti initially played on loan for AC Asti (1961–62) in Serie D, making his professional debut with the club and scoring 2 goals in 24 appearances, before returning to Torino the following season. He made his debut with the club on 21 October 1962, in a 1–0 away defeat to Genoa in Serie A. During his nine seasons in Turin, he made 275 official appearances for the club (224 in Serie A, with 18 goals, 37 in the Coppa Italia, with 4 goals, and 14 appearances in European Competitions, with 1 goal, as well as 10 in friendly matches, bringing his total to 285 appearances), scoring 23 goals, and is the club's 14th highest appearance holder. Alongside his team-mate Natalino Fossati, he formed one of the strongest full-back pairings in Serie A at the time, developing into an efficient two-way full-back who contributed both offensively and defensively, under the tutelage of manager Nereo Rocco. During his time at the club, he was also the main penalty taker, despite being a defender, which allowed him to contribute with several goals throughout his career.

Poletti later moved to Cagliari (1971–74), and subsequently for a season at Sampdoria, where he ended his career at the end of the 1974–75 season, making 5 appearances (and one additional appearance in a friendly). In total, he spent 13 seasons in Serie A, making 294 appearances and scoring 20 goals, also making 344 career appearances and scoring 24 goals.

== International career ==
Poletti earned six caps for the Italy national team between 1965 and 1970, making his debut on 16 June 1965 against Sweden. Poletti also made six appearances for the Italian B side, and was a member of the Italian team that won the gold medal at the 1963 Mediterranean Games in Naples. He also notably played for Italy in the 1970 FIFA World Cup Semi-final victory against West Germany, known as "the Match of the Century", coming on for the injured Roberto Rosato in extra-time; despite their performance, he and the Italian goalkeeper Albertosi are often held responsible for Gerd Müller's goal, due to a defensive misunderstanding between the two players. Italy went on to reach the final of the tournament, only to be defeated 4–1 by Brazil.

== Managerial career ==
In January 1978, Poletti replaced Gianfranco Bozzao as Suzzara's coach in Serie D, but was unable to prevent the team's relegation to the Promozione league division. He is currently working as a coach in Costa Rica, where he has resided after moving there in the 80s with his partner Maritza.

== Personal life ==
Poletti has two children (Marco and Erika), three grandchildren (Milena, Fabiola, and Martina), and two great-grandchildren (Samuele and Zoe). The evening of 15 October 1967, in Torino, he was hit by a motorist after crossing Corso Re Umberto, sustaining a minor injury to his leg; his close friend and team-mate Gigi Meroni, who was with him at the time following Torino's match against Sampdoria, was killed in the crash.

== Honours ==
Torino

- Coppa Italia: 1967–68, 1970–71

Italy

- Mediterranean Games: 1963
- FIFA World Cup runner-up: 1970

Individual

- Medaglia d'oro al valore atletico
