= Janet Hogan =

Australian swimmer

Personal information
- Born: 8 April 1945 Sydney, Australia
- Died: 19 June 2024 (aged 79)

Sport
- Sport: Swimming

Janet Christina Hogan (8 April 1945 – 19 June 2024) was an Australian swimmer who competed in the women's 200 metre breaststroke at the 1960 Summer Olympics.

She competed at the 1958 British Empire and Commonwealth Games in Cardiff and the 1962 British Empire and Commonwealth Gamesin Perth.
