= Amélie Mirkowitch =

French swimmer (born 1942)

Personal information
- Born: 23 June 1942 (age 84) Villerupt, France

Sport
- Sport: Swimming

Amélie Mirkowitch (born 23 June 1942) is a French former swimmer. She competed in the women's 200 metre breaststroke at the 1960 Summer Olympics.
