= Maya Hungerbühler =

Swiss swimmer

Personal information
- Born: 25 March 1943 (age 83) Zürich, Switzerland

Sport
- Sport: Swimming

Maya Hungerbühler (born 25 March 1943) is a Swiss former swimmer. She competed in the women's 200 metre breaststroke at the 1960 Summer Olympics.
