= Dorrit Kristensen =

Danish swimmer

Personal information
- Born: 21 March 1938 (age 88) Silkeborg, Denmark

Sport
- Sport: Swimming

Dorrit Kristensen (born 21 March 1938) is a Danish former swimmer. She competed in the women's 200 metre breaststroke at the 1960 Summer Olympics.
