= Giovanni Giacomazzi =

Italian footballer

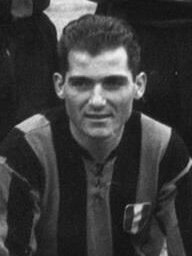

Personal information
- Full name: Giovanni Giacomazzi
- Date of birth: 18 January 1928
- Place of birth: San Martino di Lupari, Italy
- Date of death: 12 December 1995 (aged 67)
- Place of death: Milan, Italy
- Height: 1.73 m (5 ft 8 in)
- Position: Defender

Senior career*
Years	Team	Apps	(Gls)
1948–1949	Luparense		
1949–1957	Inter	208	(3)
1949–1953	Alessandria	169	(2)
1953–1956	Sampdoria	72	(3)
1956–1960	Padova	120	(3)
1960–1961	Cremonese	28	(1)

International career
1954–1955	Italy	8	(0)
- * Club domestic league appearances and goals

Giovanni Giacomazzi (Italian pronunciation: [dʒoˈvanni dʒakoˈmattsi]; 18 January 1928 – 12 December 1995) was an Italian footballer who played as a defender.

== Club career ==
Giacomazzi rose the ranks quickly having in one year gone from Serie D to Inter in Serie A, where he remained for eight seasons. A classic player, he was known for his humility, dedication, and work-rate. In only a year, he earned the starting spot and the club's #3 shirt. Soon he formed the central part of a defence which was strong enough to help the team win two championships (in 1953 and 1954) and earn a call up to the national team. As a veteran player, he went to Alessandria where he played three seasons in Serie A and four in Serie B along with a talented youngster in Gianni Rivera.

== International career ==
Giovanni Giacomazzi was one of five players that played every game for Italy at the 1954 World Cup (the others being Lorenzi, Nesti, Pandolfini and Tognon). He won eight consecutive caps with Italy between 1954 and 1955.
