= Germany–Italy football rivalry =

Football rivalry between the national football teams of Germany and Italy

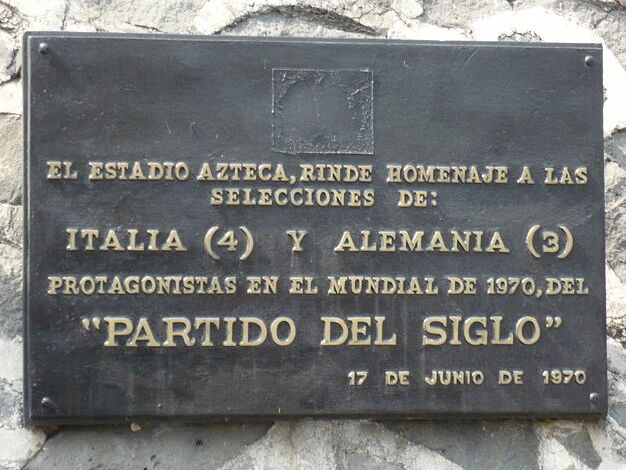
- Commemorative plaque at the Estadio Azteca in Mexico City for the Game of the Century
- Location: Europe (UEFA)
- Teams: Germany; Italy
- First meeting: 1 January 1923; Friendly; Italy 3–1 Germany
- Latest meeting: 23 March 2025; UEFA Nations League; Germany 3–3 Italy

Statistics
- Total meetings: 39
- Most wins: Italy (15)
- All-time series: Italy: 15; Draws: 13; Germany: 11
- Largest victory: Germany 5–2 Italy (26 November 1939); Italy 4–1 Germany (1 March 2006); Germany 4–1 Italy (29 March 2016); Germany 5–2 Italy (14 June 2022)
- Largest goal scoring: Germany 5–2 Italy (26 November 1939); Italy 4–3 (a.e.t.) West Germany (17 June 1970); Germany 5–2 Italy (14 June 2022)

The Germany–Italy football rivalry (German: Deutsch-italienische Fußballrivalität; Italian: Rivalità calcistica Germania-Italia) between the national football teams of Germany and Italy, the two most successful football nations in Europe, is a long-running one. Overall, the two teams have won eight FIFA World Cup championships (four each, including one win on each other's home soil) and made a total of 14 appearances in the final of the tournament (eight by Germany and six by Italy) - more than all other European countries combined.

They have played against each other five times in the World Cup, (Italy having won three games, drawn two, and never lost) and many of these matches have been notable in the history of the tournament. The "Game of the Century", the 1970 semifinal between the two countries that Italy won 4–3 in extra time, was so dramatic that it is commemorated by a plaque at the entrance of the Estadio Azteca in Mexico City. Germany has also won the European Championship three times while Italy has won it twice. The two countries have faced each other four times in the European championship, with one victory for each country and two draws.

While Germany has won more international championships, Italy is largely dominant in the head-to-head international match-up, having beaten Germany 15 times in 39 games, with 13 draws and 11 defeats. All of Germany's wins over Italy came in minor tournaments or friendly competitions alongside their win on penalties after the score was 1–1 after extra time in the quarter-finals of Euro 2016. There were also four matches played between Italy and East Germany which resulted in 1 win for each country and 2 draws.

== List of matches ==
| Number | Date | Location | Competition | Game | Results |
|---|---|---|---|---|---|
| 1 | 1 January 1923 | (Italy) Milan | Friendly | Italy – Germany | 3–1 |
| 2 | 23 November 1924 | (Weimar Republic) Duisburg | Friendly | Germany – Italy | 0–1 |
| 3 | 28 April 1929 | (Italy) Turin | Friendly | Italy – Germany | 1–2 |
| 4 | 2 March 1930 | (Weimar Republic) Frankfurt | Friendly | Germany – Italy | 0–2 |
| 5 | 1 January 1933 | (Italy) Bologna | Friendly | Italy – Germany | 3–1 |
| 6 | 15 November 1936 | (Germany) Berlin | Friendly | Germany – Italy | 2–2 |
| 7 | 26 March 1939 | (Italy) Florence | Friendly | Italy – Germany | 3–2 |
| 8 | 26 November 1939 | (Germany) Berlin | Friendly | Germany – Italy | 5–2 |
| 9 | 5 May 1940 | (Italy) Milan | Friendly | Italy – Germany | 3–2 |
| 10 | 30 March 1955 | (West Germany) Stuttgart | Friendly | Germany – Italy | 1–2 |
| 11 | 18 December 1955 | (Italy) Rome | Friendly | Italy – Germany | 2–1 |
| 12 | 31 May 1962 | (Chile) Santiago | 1962 World Cup | Italy – Germany | 0–0 |
| 13 | 13 March 1965 | (West Germany) Hamburg | Friendly | Germany – Italy | 1–1 |
| 14 | 17 June 1970 | Mexico City | 1970 World Cup | Italy – Germany | 4–3 (a.e.t.) |
| 15 | 26 February 1974 | (Italy) Rome | Friendly | Italy – Germany | 0–0 |
| 16 | 8 October 1977 | (West Germany) Berlin | Friendly | Germany – Italy | 2–1 |
| 17 | 14 June 1978 | (Argentina) Buenos Aires | 1978 World Cup | Italy – Germany | 0–0 |
| 18 | 11 July 1982 | (Spain) Madrid | 1982 World Cup | Italy – Germany | 3–1 |
| 19 | 22 May 1984 | (Switzerland) Zürich | Friendly | Germany – Italy | 1–0 |
| 20 | 5 February 1986 | (Italy) Avellino | Friendly | Italy – Germany | 1–2 |
| 21 | 18 April 1987 | (West Germany) Köln | Friendly | Germany – Italy | 0–0 |
| 22 | 10 June 1988 | (West Germany) Düsseldorf | Euro 1988 | Germany – Italy | 1–1 |
| 23 | 25 March 1992 | (Italy) Turin | Friendly | Italy – Germany | 1–0 |
| 24 | 23 March 1994 | (Germany) Stuttgart | Friendly | Germany – Italy | 2–1 |
| 25 | 21 June 1995 | (Switzerland) Zürich | Friendly | Germany – Italy | 2–0 |
| 26 | 19 June 1996 | (England) Manchester | Euro 1996 | Germany – Italy | 0–0 |
| 27 | 20 August 2003 | (Germany) Stuttgart | Friendly | Germany – Italy | 0–1 |
| 28 | 1 March 2006 | (Italy) Florence | Friendly | Italy – Germany | 4–1 |
| 29 | 4 July 2006 | (Germany) Dortmund | 2006 World Cup | Germany – Italy | 0–2 (a.e.t.) |
| 30 | 9 February 2011 | (Germany) Dortmund | Friendly | Germany – Italy | 1–1 |
| 31 | 28 June 2012 | (Poland) Warsaw | Euro 2012 | Germany – Italy | 1–2 |
| 32 | 15 November 2013 | (Italy) Milan | Friendly | Italy – Germany | 1–1 |
| 33 | 29 March 2016 | (Germany) Munich | Friendly | Germany – Italy | 4–1 |
| 34 | 2 July 2016 | (France) Bordeaux | Euro 2016 | Germany – Italy | 1–1 (a.e.t.) (6–5 p) |
| 35 | 15 November 2016 | (Italy) Milan | Friendly | Italy – Germany | 0–0 |
| 36 | 4 June 2022 | (Italy) Bologna | 2022–23 Nations League | Italy – Germany | 1–1 |
| 37 | 14 June 2022 | (Germany) Mönchengladbach | 2022–23 Nations League | Germany – Italy | 5–2 |
| 38 | 20 March 2025 | (Italy) Milan | 2024–25 Nations League | Italy – Germany | 1–2 |
| 39 | 23 March 2025 | (Germany) Dortmund | 2024–25 Nations League | Germany – Italy | 3–3 |

== Comparison in major tournaments ==
Key

Denotes which team finished better in that particular competition.
DNQ: Did not qualify.
DNP: Did not participate.
TBD: To be determined.

| Tournament | Germany | Italy | Notes |
|---|---|---|---|
| 1930 FIFA World Cup | DNP | DNP | |
| 1934 FIFA World Cup | 3rd | 1st | Tournament hosted by Italy. |
| 1938 FIFA World Cup | 10th | 1st | |
| 1950 FIFA World Cup | DNP | 7th | Germany not a member of FIFA. |
| 1954 FIFA World Cup | 1st | 10th | |
| 1958 FIFA World Cup | 4th | DNQ | |
| Euro 1960 | DNP | DNP | |
| 1962 FIFA World Cup | 7th | 9th | In the group stage, the match ended 0–0. |
| Euro 1964 | DNP | DNQ | |
| 1966 FIFA World Cup | 2nd | 9th | |
| Euro 1968 | DNQ | 1st | Tournament hosted by Italy. |
| 1970 FIFA World Cup | 3rd | 2nd | In the semifinals, Italy defeated Germany 4–3 after extra time. |
| Euro 1972 | 1st | DNQ | |
| 1974 FIFA World Cup | 1st | 10th | Tournament hosted by West Germany. |
| Euro 1976 | 2nd | DNQ | |
| 1978 FIFA World Cup | 6th | 4th | In the second round, the match ended 0–0. |
| Euro 1980 | 1st | 4th | Tournament hosted by Italy. |
| 1982 FIFA World Cup | 2nd | 1st | In the final, Italy defeated Germany 3–1. |
| Euro 1984 | 5th | DNQ | |
| 1986 FIFA World Cup | 2nd | 12th | |
| Euro 1988 | 3rd | 4th | Tournament hosted by West Germany. In the group stage, the match ended 1–1. |
| 1990 FIFA World Cup | 1st | 3rd | Tournament hosted by Italy. |
| Euro 1992 | 2nd | DNQ | |
| 1994 FIFA World Cup | 5th | 2nd | |
| Euro 1996 | 1st | 10th | In the group stage, the match ended 0–0. |
| 1998 FIFA World Cup | 7th | 5th | |
| Euro 2000 | 15th | 2nd | |
| 2002 FIFA World Cup | 2nd | 15th | |
| Euro 2004 | 12th | 9th | |
| 2006 FIFA World Cup | 3rd | 1st | Tournament hosted by Germany. In the semifinals, Italy defeated Germany 2–0 after extra time. |
| Euro 2008 | 2nd | 8th | |
| 2010 FIFA World Cup | 3rd | 26th | |
| Euro 2012 | 3rd | 2nd | In the semifinals, Italy defeated Germany 2–1. |
| 2014 FIFA World Cup | 1st | 22nd | |
| Euro 2016 | 3rd | 5th | In the quarter-finals, Germany beat Italy 6–5 on penalties after the score was 1–1 after extra time. |
| 2018 FIFA World Cup | 22nd | DNQ | |
| Euro 2020 | 15th | 1st | Tournament hosted by multiple countries; Germany and Italy hosted some matches. |
| 2022 FIFA World Cup | 17th | DNQ | |
| Euro 2024 | 5th | 14th | Tournament hosted by Germany. |
| 2026 FIFA World Cup | 18th | DNQ | |
| Euro 2028 | TBD | TBD | |

== Major encounters ==
=== 1962 World Cup ===
This game was the first match ever played in a World Cup between Germany and Italy, and saw few scoring chances for both sides. In the first half Uwe Seeler hit the bar, Albert Brülls and Omar Sívori also had their chances. In the second half the game became more physical and sometimes brutal but in the end defences overcame attacks and no goals were scored.

31 May 1962
15:00 CLT

| West Germany | 0–0 | Italy |
|---|---|---|
| | Report |

Estadio Nacional, Santiago
Attendance: 65,440
Referee: Robert Holley Davidson (Scotland)

=== 1970 World Cup ===
Italy led for the majority of the semi-final match, after Roberto Boninsegna scored in the 8th minute. Germany's Franz Beckenbauer dislocated his shoulder after being fouled, but stayed on the field carrying his dislocated arm in a sling, as his side had already used their two permitted substitutions.

Defender Karl-Heinz Schnellinger equalized for West Germany during injury time at the end of the second half. German television commentator Ernst Huberty exclaimed "Schnellinger, of all people!", since Schnellinger played in Italy's professional football league, Serie A, at A.C. Milan (for whom he rarely scored) and previously for A.S. Roma and A.C. Mantova. It was also his first and only goal in 47 matches for the national team. The second half ended with the scores deadlocked at 1–1, and at this point the match became a battle of endurance during the two periods of extra time.

Gerd Müller put Germany ahead in the 94th minute, but Tarcisio Burgnich tied it back up four minutes later and Luigi Riva put the Italians back in front. Gerd Müller scored again for West Germany to tie up the score at 3–3. Yet, as television cameras were still replaying Müller's goal, Italy's Gianni Rivera scored the game-winning goal in the 111th minute. Being left unmarked near the penalty area, Rivera connected a fine cross made by Boninsegna, clinching the victory for Italy at 4–3.

17 June 1970
16:00 CST

| Italy | 4–3 (a.e.t.) | West Germany |
|---|---|---|
| Boninsegna 8'; Burgnich 98'; Riva 104'; Rivera 111' | Report | Schnellinger 90'; Müller 94', 110' |

Estadio Azteca, Mexico City
Attendance: 102,444
Referee: Arturo Yamasaki Maldonado (Mexico)

=== 1978 World Cup ===
This match was played in the first matchday of Group A of the 1978 FIFA World Cup, a round robin played between the winners and the runners-up of the groups of the first phase; the game ended in a scoreless draw. At the end of the second phase Italy managed to reach the match for third place against Brazil, while Germany were eliminated as third in the group.

14 June 1978
13:45 ART

| Italy | 0–0 | West Germany |
|---|---|---|
| | Report |

Estadio Monumental, Buenos Aires
Attendance: 67,547
Referee: Dušan Maksimović (Yugoslavia)

=== 1982 World Cup ===
On 11 July, after a scoreless first half during which Antonio Cabrini fired a penalty low and wide to the right of goal, Paolo Rossi scored first, heading home a bouncing Claudio Gentile cross from the right from close range. Marco Tardelli then scored from the edge of the area with a low left footed shot before Alessandro Altobelli, at the end of a counterattack by winger Bruno Conti, made it 3–0 with another low left footed shot. Paul Breitner scored for Germany in the 83rd minute, firing low past the goalkeeper from the right, but Italy held on to claim their first World Cup title in 44 years, and their third in total with a 3–1 victory.

11 July 1982
20:00 CEST

| Italy | 3–1 | West Germany |
|---|---|---|
| Rossi 57'; Tardelli 69'; Altobelli 81' | Report | Breitner 83' |

Santiago Bernabéu, Madrid
Attendance: 90,000
Referee: Arnaldo Cézar Coelho (Brazil)

=== Euro 1988 ===
Both the sides faced-off in the opening match of Euro 1988 in group stage held in West Germany. The first half ended without any goals. Within 10 minutes of the second half Roberto Mancini gave the Italian side the lead by scoring at the 52nd minute, however the lead was short lived as Andreas Brehme scored the equalizer for West Germany at the 55th minute. The game ended in a draw with one goal for each side. Both sides would advance past round 1 but Italy would lose to the Soviet Union while Germany would lose to the Netherlands.

10 June 1988
20:15 CEST

| West Germany | 1–1 | Italy |
|---|---|---|
| Brehme 55' | Report | Mancini 52' |

Rheinstadion, Düsseldorf
Attendance: 62,552
Referee: Keith Hackett (England)

=== Euro 1996 ===
The two teams were matched up in the final game of the group stage of UEFA Euro 1996. Germany was already guaranteed progress to the next stage unless Italy and Czech Republic both won their matches while Italy was faced with a must-win situation if the Czech Republic did not lose to Russia. Gianfranco Zola had a penalty saved by Andreas Köpke in the 9th minute and Thomas Strunz was sent off in the 59th minute. Despite the man advantage and the lion's share of possession, Italy failed to score due to the heroic display of Köpke. The goalless draw resulted in Italy being eliminated from the tournament as the Czech Republic drew with Russia.

19 June 1996
19:30 BST

| Italy | 0–0 | Germany |
|---|---|---|
| | Report |

Old Trafford, Greater Manchester
Attendance: 53,740
Referee: Guy Goethals (Belgium)

=== 2006 World Cup ===
This was the semi-final match played in Westfalenstadion, Dortmund, in front of a crowd of 65,000 on 4 July 2006. Until then, the Westfalenstadion had been a fortress-like stadium for the Germany national team, as Germany had never lost there in 14 matches. During an eventful match, this record was broken when two late goals in the closing half of extra-time scored by Fabio Grosso and Alessandro Del Piero saw Italy advance to the final. Italy went on to win the World Cup for a fourth time.

German midfielder Torsten Frings was suspended for this match after the media released footage of him throwing a punch at Argentinian player Julio Cruz after a brawl broke out in Germany's quarter-final against Argentina; FIFA announced his suspension one day before the semi-final match.

4 July 2006
21:00 CEST

| Germany | 0–2 (a.e.t.) | Italy |
|---|---|---|
| | Report | Grosso 119'; Del Piero 120+1' |

FIFA WM Stadion Dortmund, Dortmund
Attendance: 65,000
Referee: Benito Archundia (Mexico)

=== Euro 2012 ===
Italy met Germany again in the semi-final match of Euro 2012 in the evening of 28 June 2012 at the National Stadium in Warsaw. Prior to this match, Germany had set a football world record of 15 consecutive wins in competitive matches, which started with the 3-2 win over Uruguay in the third place play-off of the 2010 World Cup and ended with the 4–2 victory over Greece in the Euro 2012 quarter-finals. However, this record was to be broken by Italy on that day.

In the 20th minute, Italian striker Mario Balotelli scored the first goal for Italy, in the left corner of the net, heading past German goalkeeper Manuel Neuer after receiving a cross from Antonio Cassano, then in the 36th minute, Balotelli scored again for Italy, this time blasted into the top right corner on a one-on-one with Neuer, assisted by a Riccardo Montolivo lob over the German defence, giving them a two-goal lead. In the second half, the Germans attacked, trying to even the score. Italian goalkeeper Gianluigi Buffon made several impressive saves to many German shots. Two minutes into added time, Italian defender Federico Balzaretti committed a handball inside the penalty box. The resulting penalty was successfully converted by the German midfielder Mesut Özil.

Thus, the final score was 2–1 to Italy, who went on to the finals against defending champions Spain. As in their previous encounter in the 2006 World Cup semifinal match, Andrea Pirlo was again elected the man of the match.

28 June 2012
20:45 CEST

| Germany | 1–2 | Italy |
|---|---|---|
| Özil 90+2' (pen.) | Report | Balotelli 20', 36' |

National Stadium, Warsaw
Attendance: 55,540
Referee: Stéphane Lannoy (France)

=== Euro 2016 ===
On 2 July 2016, Germany and Italy met at the Nouveau Stade de Bordeaux in Bordeaux during the quarter-finals of UEFA Euro 2016 where the score was 1-1 after extra time, with Germany winning 6–5 in a penalty shoot-out, and this was the first time ever that Germany beat Italy in a competitive match.

Mesut Özil scored in the 65th minute to give Germany the lead. In the 78th minute Leonardo Bonucci scored from the penalty spot after Jérôme Boateng was fouled for a handball in the box. After a goalless extra time period, with the two sides still locked at one goal each, Germany won 6-5 on penalties.

Manuel Neuer (Germany) and Gianluigi Buffon (Italy), the goalkeeper-captains of their respective teams for the quarter-final (although Neuer handed the skipper's armband when Bastian Schweinsteiger was substituted in), were the last goalkeepers who had not conceded a goal in the tournament until this match. They received praise for their performances in the quarter-final.

2 July 2016
21:00 CEST

| Germany | 1–1 (a.e.t.) | Italy |
|---|---|---|
| Özil 65' | Report | Bonucci 78' (pen.) |
Penalties
| Kroos (penalty scored); Müller (penalty missed); Özil (penalty missed); Draxler (penalty scored); Schweinsteiger (penalty missed); Hummels (penalty scored); Kimmich (penalty scored); Boateng (penalty scored); Hector (penalty scored) | 6–5 | (penalty scored) Insigne; (penalty missed) Zaza; (penalty scored) Barzagli; (penalty missed) Pellè; (penalty missed) Bonucci; (penalty scored) Giaccherini; (penalty scored) Parolo; (penalty scored) De Sciglio; (penalty missed) Darmian |

Nouveau Stade de Bordeaux, Bordeaux
Attendance: 38,764
Referee: Viktor Kassai (Hungary)

=== 2022–23 UEFA Nations League ===
Both teams were drawn together in Group A3 of the 2022–23 UEFA Nations League A. The first leg was played in Bologna where the game ended 1–1 and the second leg was played in Monchengladbach, during which Germany beat Italy 5–2 to earn their first-ever competitive win in regulation time against Italy.

4 June 2022
20:45

| Italy | 1–1 | Germany |
|---|---|---|
| Pellegrini 70' | Report | Kimmich 73' |

Stadio Renato Dall'Ara, Bologna
Attendance: 23,754
Referee: Srđan Jovanović (Serbia)

14 June 2022
20:45

| Germany | 5–2 | Italy |
|---|---|---|
| Kimmich 10'; Gündoğan 45+4' (pen.); Müller 51'; Werner 68', 69' | Report | Gnonto 78'; Bastoni 90+4' |

Borussia-Park, Mönchengladbach
Attendance: 44,144
Referee: István Kovács (Romania)

=== 2024–25 UEFA Nations League ===
Both teams were drawn together for the quarter-finals of the 2024–25 UEFA Nations League A.

20 March 2025
20:45

| Italy | 1–2 | Germany |
|---|---|---|
| Tonali 9' | Report | Kleindienst 49'; Goretzka 76' |

San Siro, Milan
Attendance: 60,334
Referee: François Letexier (France)

23 March 2025
20:45

| Germany | 3–3 | Italy |
|---|---|---|
| Kimmich 30' (pen.); Musiala 36'; Kleindienst 45' | Report | Kean 49', 69'; Raspadori 90+5' (pen.) |

Westfalenstadion, Dortmund
Attendance: 64,762
Referee: Szymon Marciniak (Poland)

== Statistics ==
=== Overall ===
As of 23 March 2025

| Competition | Matches | Wins | | Draws | Goals | |
| Competition | Matches | Germany | Italy | Draws | Germany | Italy |
|---|---|---|---|---|---|---|
| FIFA World Cup | 5 | 0 | 3 | 2 | 4 | 9 |
| UEFA Euros | 4 | 1 | 1 | 2 | 9 | 9 |
| UEFA Nations League | 4 | 2 | 0 | 2 | 11 | 7 |
| All competitions | 13 | 3 | 4 | 6 | 24 | 25 |
| Friendly | 26 | 8 | 11 | 7 | 34 | 37 |
| All matches | 39 | 11 | 15 | 13 | 58 | 62 |

=== Trophies ===
| Competition | Titles | |
| Competition | Germany | Italy |
|---|---|---|
| FIFA World Cup | 4 | 4 |
| FIFA Confederations Cup | 1 | 0 |
| UEFA Euros | 3 | 2 |
| UEFA Nations League | 0 | 0 |
| Summer Olympics | 1 | 1 |
| All competitions | 9 | 7 |

== See also ==
- Football derbies in Italy
- German football rivalries
- Germany–Italy relations
- List of association football rivalries
