= Inge Andersen (swimmer) =

Danish swimmer

Personal information
- Born: 23 March 1944 (age 82) Copenhagen, Denmark

Sport
- Sport: Swimming

Inge Andersen (born 23 March 1944) is a Danish former swimmer. She competed in the women's 200 metre breaststroke at the 1960 Summer Olympics.
