= Regina Veloso =

Portuguese swimmer (1939–2024)

Personal information
- Born: 27 March 1939 Chinde, Portuguese Mozambique
- Died: June 2024 (aged 85)

Sport
- Sport: Swimming

Regina Veloso (27 March 1939 – June 2024) was a Portuguese swimmer. She competed in the women's 200 metre breaststroke at the 1960 Summer Olympics. Veloso died in June 2024, at the age of 85.
