= Barbara Göbel =

East German swimmer

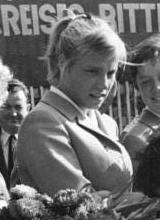
- Barbara Göbel in 1960

Personal information
- Born: 8 April 1943 (age 83) Jena, Germany
- Height: 1.72 m (5 ft 8 in)
- Weight: 66 kg (146 lb)

Sport
- Sport: Swimming
- Club: Tus Jena
Medal record
Women's swimming
Representing East Germany
Women's Swimming
Bronze medal – third place	1960 Rome	200 m breaststroke
European Championships
Gold medal – first place	1962 Leipzig	4×100 m medley

Barbara Göbel (born 8 April 1943) is a German former swimmer who won a bronze medal at the 1960 Summer Olympics in the 200 m breaststroke event.

At the 1962 European Aquatics Championships, she won a gold medal in the 4 × 100 m medley relay, setting the new world record. For this achievement, the relay team members were named German Sportspersonalities of the Year in the team category in 1962.
