= Italy v West Germany (1970 FIFA World Cup) =

Semi-final of the 1970 FIFA World Cup

Coordinates: 19°18′12″N 99°9′2″W

1970 FIFA World Cup Semi-final
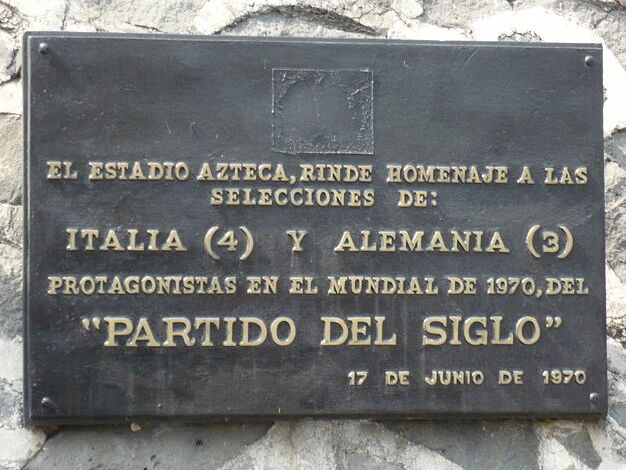
- The plaque commemorating the match at the Estadio Azteca in Mexico City
- Event: 1970 FIFA World Cup
Italy	West Germany
(Italy)	(West Germany)
4	3
- After extra time
- Date: 17 June 1970
- Venue: Estadio Azteca, Mexico City
- Referee: Arturo Yamasaki (Mexico)
- Attendance: 102,444

The semi-final of the 1970 FIFA World Cup between Italy and West Germany has been called the "Game of the Century" (Spanish: Partido del Siglo; Italian: Partita del secolo; German: Jahrhundertspiel). It was played on 17 June 1970 at the Estadio Azteca in Mexico City. Italy won 4–3 after five of the seven goals were scored in extra time, the record for most goals scored during extra time in a FIFA World Cup game. The result eliminated West Germany from the tournament while Italy went on to lose to Brazil in the final.

== Match ==
=== Summary ===
Italy led 1–0 for the majority of the match, after Roberto Boninsegna scored in the 8th minute. In the 70th minute, West German defender Franz Beckenbauer dislocated his shoulder, but stayed on the field carrying his dislocated arm in a sling, as his side had already used their two permitted substitutions.

Defender Karl-Heinz Schnellinger equalised for West Germany in the 90th minute. German television commentator Ernst Huberty famously exclaimed "Schnellinger, of all people!" (in German: "Schnellinger! Ausgerechnet Schnellinger!"), since Schnellinger played in Italy's professional football league, Serie A, at A.C. Milan (for whom he had never scored). It was also his first and only goal in a career total of 47 matches for the West Germany national team. At the end of regulation time, the score was level at 1–1, forcing the match into extra time. Had the match remained drawn after extra time, lots would have been drawn to decide which team would progress to the final.

Gerd Müller put West Germany ahead in the 94th minute following a defensive error by Fabrizio Poletti, who had just come on as a substitute, but Tarcisio Burgnich equalised only four minutes later, and then striker Gigi Riva put the Italians in front again with a superb goal. Müller scored yet again, this time with a header, for West Germany to tie the score at 3–3. Yet, as the live television coverage was still replaying Müller's goal, Italian midfielder Gianni Rivera scored what proved to be the match-winning goal in the 111th minute. Being left unmarked near the penalty area, Rivera had connected perfectly with a fine cross made by Boninsegna, clinching the victory for Italy at 4–3.

=== Details ===
17 June 1970
16:00

Italy	4–3 (a.e.t.)	West Germany
Boninsegna 8'; Burgnich 98'; Riva 104'; Rivera 111'		Schnellinger 90+2'; Müller 94', 110'

Estadio Azteca, Mexico City
Attendance: 102,444
Referee: Arturo Yamasaki (Mexico)

Italy	West Germany

GK	1	Enrico Albertosi	(yellow card) 73'
RB	2	Tarcisio Burgnich
CB	8	Roberto Rosato	(yellow card) 38'	(substituted off) 91'
CB	5	Pierluigi Cera
LB	3	Giacinto Facchetti (c)
DM	10	Mario Bertini
RM	13	Angelo Domenghini	(yellow card) 114'
CM	16	Giancarlo De Sisti	(yellow card) 103'
LM	15	Sandro Mazzola		(substituted off) 46'
CF	20	Roberto Boninsegna
CF	11	Gigi Riva
Substitutions:
MF	14	Gianni Rivera		(substituted on) 46'
DF	4	Fabrizio Poletti		(substituted on) 91'
Manager:
Ferruccio Valcareggi

GK	1	Sepp Maier
SW	5	Willi Schulz
CB	15	Bernd Patzke		(substituted off) 66'
CB	3	Karl-Heinz Schnellinger
DM	4	Franz Beckenbauer
RM	7	Berti Vogts
LM	17	Hannes Löhr		(substituted off) 52'
AM	12	Wolfgang Overath	(yellow card) 53'
RF	20	Jürgen Grabowski
CF	13	Gerd Müller	(yellow card) 66'
LF	9	Uwe Seeler (c)
Substitutions:
FW	14	Reinhard Libuda		(substituted on) 52'
FW	10	Sigfried Held		(substituted on) 66'
Manager:
Helmut Schön

Assistant referees:
Rafael Hormazábal Díaz (Chile)
Guillermo Velasquez (Colombia)

== Aftermath ==
West Germany went on to defeat Uruguay in the third-place game, 1–0.

Italy, after having expended a great amount of energy in winning the match, was defeated by Brazil in the Final 4–1. Brazil thus became the first team to win three world football championships.

A monument commemorating this match was added to front of the Estadio Azteca. On a plaque the following sentence is engraved:

El Estadio Azteca rinde homenaje a las selecciones de: Italia (4) y Alemania (3) protagonistas en el Mundial de 1970, del "Partido del Siglo" 17 de junio de 1970.
(English translation: "Azteca Stadium pays tribute to the national teams of Italy (4) and Germany (3), protagonists of the "Match of the Century" at the 1970 World Cup.")

== See also ==
- Germany–Italy football rivalry
- 1970 FIFA World Cup knockout stage
- Germany at the FIFA World Cup
- Italy at the FIFA World Cup
