= Giorgio Tinazzi =

Italian footballer

Personal information
- Date of birth: 21 June 1934
- Place of birth: Milan, Italy
- Date of death: 18 February 2016 (aged 81)
- Height: 1.72 m (5 ft 7 1/2 in)
- Position: Midfielder

Senior career*
Years	Team	Apps	(Gls)
1954–1955	Internazionale	1	(0)
1955–1957	Alessandria	46	(11)
1957–1958	Internazionale	12	(2)
1958–1960	Verona	65	(18)
1960–1961	Udinese	21	(3)
1961–1964	Modena	73	(8)
1964–1967	Palermo	91	(17)
1967–1970	Casale	87	(11)
- * Club domestic league appearances and goals

Giorgio Tinazzi (21 June 1934 – 18 February 2016) was an Italian professional football player.
