= Enriqueta Maroni =

Argentine human rights activist (1927–2025)

Enriqueta Maroni (Spanish: [enɾiˈketa maˈɾoni]; 7 February 1927 – 5 August 2025) was an Argentine human rights activist.

== Biography ==
Maroni was born on 7 February 1927. She was a member of Mothers of Plaza de Mayo from 1977, after two of her children were forcefully disappeared by the military dictatorship known as National Reorganization Process. She became internationally known after being interviewed by Dutch television during the 1978 FIFA World Cup, where she spoke openly about the crimes of the dictatorship. She was the organization’s president from 2022 to 2024. Maroni died on 5 August 2025, at the age of 98.
