= Gretta Kok =

Dutch swimmer (born 1944)

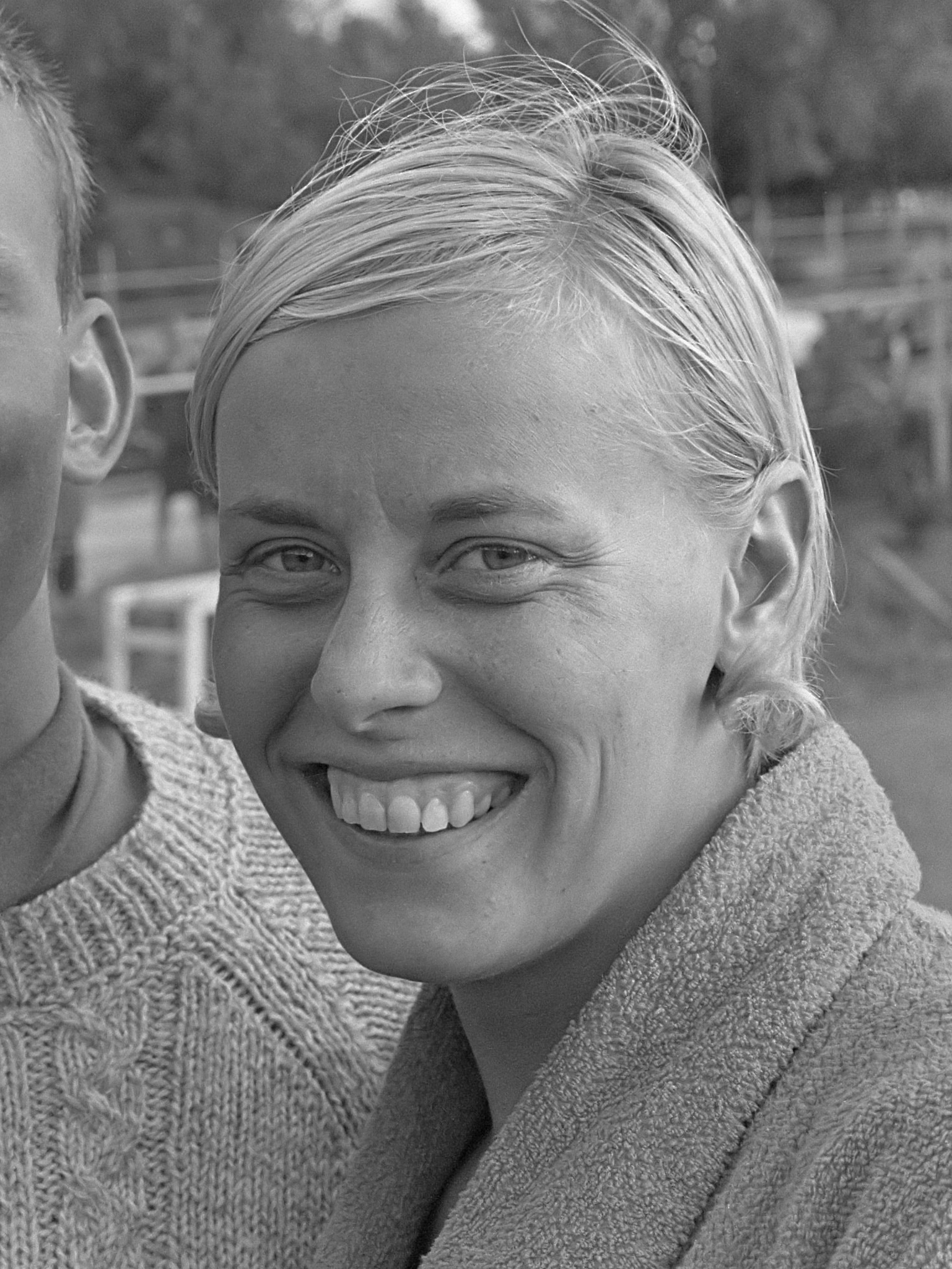
- Gretta Kok in 1966

Medal record

Women's swimming

Representing the Netherlands

European Championships
Gold medal – first place	1966 Utrecht	4×100 m medley

Margretta "Gretta" Kok (born 16 October 1944, in Amsterdam) is a retired Dutch breaststroke swimmer who participated in the 1960 and 1964 Summer Olympics. In 1960, she was fifths in the 200m breaststroke event, whereas in 1964 she did not reach the final. In 1966, she won a gold medal in the 4 × 100 m medley relay at the European Aquatics Championships. Her younger sister, Ada Kok, was also an Olympic swimmer and part of the same team that won the medley gold in 1966.
