= 1978 FIFA World Cup knockout stage =

Football tournament knockout stage

The knockout stage of 1978 FIFA World Cup was a single-elimination tournament involving the four teams that qualified from the second group stage of the tournament. There were two matches: a match for third place contested by the group runners-up, and the final to decide the champions, contested by the group winners. The knockout stage began with the match for third place on 24 June and ended with the final on 25 June 1978, both at the Estadio Monumental in Buenos Aires. Argentina won the tournament with a 3–1 victory over the Netherlands.

== Qualified teams ==
The top two placed teams from each of the two groups of the second round qualified for the knockout stage.

| Group | Winners (qualification for final) | Runners-up (qualification for match for third place) |
|---|---|---|
| A | Netherlands | Italy |
| B | Argentina | Brazil |

== Match for third place ==
As of the 2026 FIFA World Cup, this is the most recent time when the match for third place was won by a non-European team.

24 June 1978
15:00 ART

| Brazil | 2–1 | Italy |
|---|---|---|
| Nelinho 64'; Dirceu 71' | | Causio 38' |

River Plate Stadium, Buenos Aires
Attendance: 69,659
Referee: Abraham Klein (Israel)

| Brazil | Italy |

| GK | 1 | Émerson Leão (c) |
| RB | 13 | Nelinho | (yellow card) 35' |
| CB | 3 | Oscar |
| CB | 4 | Amaral |
| LB | 16 | Rodrigues Neto |
| DM | 17 | Batista | (yellow card) 44' |
| CM | 5 | Toninho Cerezo | | (substituted off) 64' |
| CM | 11 | Dirceu |
| AM | 19 | Jorge Mendonça |
| RW | 18 | Gil | | (substituted off) 45+1' |
| CF | 20 | Roberto Dinamite |
Substitutions:
| CF | 9 | Reinaldo | (substituted on) 45+1' |
| CM | 10 | Rivelino | (substituted on) 64' |
Manager:
Cláudio Coutinho

| GK | 1 | Dino Zoff (c) |
| DF | 6 | Aldo Maldera |
| DF | 3 | Antonio Cabrini |
| DF | 5 | Claudio Gentile | (yellow card) 72' |
| DF | 8 | Gaetano Scirea |
| MF | 4 | Antonello Cuccureddu |
| MF | 13 | Patrizio Sala |
| MF | 9 | Giancarlo Antognoni | | (substituted off) 78' |
| MF | 16 | Franco Causio |
| CF | 18 | Roberto Bettega |
| CF | 21 | Paolo Rossi |
Substitutions:
| MF | 17 | Claudio Sala | | (substituted on) 78' |
Manager:
Enzo Bearzot

Assistant referees:
Alfonso González Archundia (Mexico)
Károly Palotai (Hungary)

== Final ==
25 June 1978
15:00 UTC−3

| Argentina | 3–1 (a.e.t.) | Netherlands |
|---|---|---|
| Kempes 38', 105'; Bertoni 115' | | Nanninga 82' |

River Plate Stadium, Buenos Aires
Attendance: 71,483
Referee: Sergio Gonella (Italy)

| Argentina | Netherlands |

| GK | 5 | Ubaldo Fillol |
| RB | 15 | Jorge Olguín |
| CB | 7 | Luis Galván |
| CB | 19 | Daniel Passarella (c) |
| LB | 20 | Alberto Tarantini |
| DM | 6 | Américo Gallego |
| CM | 2 | Osvaldo Ardiles | (yellow card) 40' | (substituted off) 66' |
| AM | 10 | Mario Kempes |
| RW | 4 | Daniel Bertoni |
| LW | 16 | Oscar Alberto Ortiz | | (substituted off) 75' |
| CF | 14 | Leopoldo Luque |
Substitutes:
| GK | 3 | Héctor Baley |
| MF | 1 | Norberto Alonso |
| MF | 8 | Rubén Galván |
| RW | 9 | René Houseman | | (substituted on) 75' |
| CM | 12 | Omar Larrosa | (yellow card) 93' | (substituted on) 66' |
Manager:
César Luis Menotti

| GK | 8 | Jan Jongbloed |
| SW | 5 | Ruud Krol (c) | (yellow card) 15' |
| RB | 6 | Wim Jansen | | (substituted off) 73' |
| CB | 22 | Ernie Brandts |
| LB | 2 | Jan Poortvliet | (yellow card) 96' |
| RM | 13 | Johan Neeskens |
| CM | 9 | Arie Haan |
| LM | 11 | Willy van de Kerkhof |
| RF | 10 | René van de Kerkhof |
| CF | 16 | Johnny Rep | | (substituted off) 58' |
| LF | 12 | Rob Rensenbrink |
Substitutes:
| GK | 19 | Pim Doesburg |
| DF | 4 | Adrie van Kraay |
| DF | 17 | Wim Rijsbergen |
| FW | 18 | Dick Nanninga | | (substituted on) 58' |
| DF | 20 | Wim Suurbier | (yellow card) 94' | (substituted on) 73' |
Manager:
(Austria) Ernst Happel

Assistant referees
Ramón Barreto (Uruguay)
Erich Linemayr (Austria)
