= Christl Wöber =

Austrian swimmer

Personal information
- Born: 25 December 1942 (age 83) Vienna, Austria

Sport
- Sport: Swimming

Christl Wöber (born 25 December 1942) is an Austrian former swimmer. She competed in the women's 200 metre breaststroke at the 1960 Summer Olympics.
