= Alfons Van Brandt =

Belgian footballer

- Van Brandt for the Belgian national team

Personal information
- Full name: Alfons Van Brandt
- Date of birth: 24 June 1927
- Place of birth: Belgium
- Date of death: 24 August 2011 (aged 84)
- Position: Defender

Senior career*
Years	Team	Apps	(Gls)
1945–1958	Lierse	330	(6)
Total		330	(6)

International career
1950–1957	Belgium	38	(0)
- * Club domestic league appearances and goals

Alfons Van Brandt (Nijlen, 24 June 1927 – 24 August 2011), nicknamed Fons, was a Belgian football player who won the Belgian Golden Shoe in 1955 while at Lierse.

Van Brandt was born in Kessel. He played 38 times for the national team between 1950 and 1957, starting in a 7-2 friendly win against the Netherlands on 12 November 1950. Van Brandt played in the 1954 FIFA World Cup.

In 1955, he won the Belgian Golden Shoe.
