= Sergio Campana (footballer) =

Italian lawyer and footballer (1934–2025)

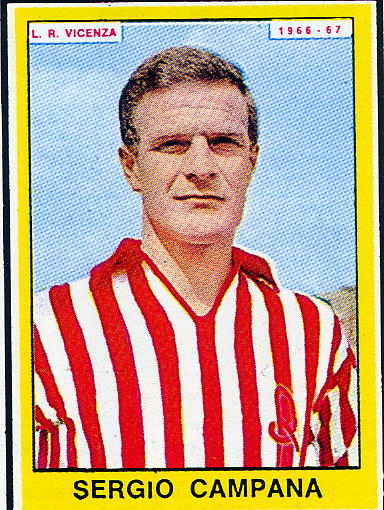
- Campana with Lanerossi Vicenza in 1966

Personal information
- Date of birth: 1 August 1934
- Place of birth: Bassano del Grappa, Italy
- Date of death: 19 July 2025 (aged 90)
- Place of death: Bassano del Grappa, Italy
- Height: 1.76 m (5 ft 9 in)
- Positions: Midfielder; forward

Senior career*
Years	Team	Apps	(Gls)
1953–1959	Lanerossi Vicenza	131	(34)
1959–1961	Bologna	50	(18)
1961–1967	Lanerossi Vicenza	108	(12)
Total		289	(64)
- * Club domestic league appearances and goals

Sergio Campana (1 August 1934 – 19 July 2025) was an Italian lawyer and professional footballer who played as a forward. He served as the first President of the Italian Footballers' Association (AIC), from its inception in 1968, until 2011, when he decided to step down.

In 2017, Campana was inducted into the Italian Football Hall of Fame. He died on 19 July 2025, at the age of 90.
