= Marco Savioni =

Italian footballer (born 1931)

Personal information
- Date of birth: 23 February 1931 (age 95)
- Place of birth: Milan, Italy
- Height: 1.69 m (5 ft 6 1/2 in)
- Position: Midfielder

Senior career*
Years	Team	Apps	(Gls)
1949–1951	Casale	73	(29)
1951–1952	Internazionale	6	(1)
1952–1954	Novara	47	(16)
1954–1955	Internazionale	16	(6)
1955–1956	Novara	29	(6)
1956–1957	Internazionale	3	(2)
1957–1958	Alessandria	30	(6)
1958–1964	Lecco	140	(18)
1964–1965	Rapallo Ruentes	20	(9)
1965–1966	Pavia	23	(4)
1966–1967	Casale	31	(6)
- * Club domestic league appearances and goals

Marco Savioni (born 23 February 1931) is an Italian former footballer who played as a midfielder. He made nearly 200 appearances in Serie A.
