= Eugène Parlier =

Swiss footballer (1929-2017)

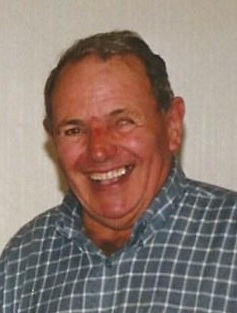

Personal information
- Date of birth: 13 February 1929
- Place of birth: Montreux, Switzerland
- Date of death: 30 october 2017 (aged 88)
- Place of death: Montreux, Switzerland
- Height: 1.77 m (5 ft 10 in)
- Position: Goalkeeper

Senior career*
| Years | Team | Apps | (Gls) |
| 1948–1949 | Neuchâtel Xamax | | |
| 1949–1954 | Servette FC | | |
| 1955–1959 | Urania Genève Sport | | |
| 1960–1964 | FC Biel-Bienne | | |
| 1964–1965 | FC Lausanne-Sport | | |
| 1965–1966 | Étoile Carouge FC | | |

International career
| 1952–1960 | Switzerland | 21 | (0) |
- * Club domestic league appearances and goals

Eugène Parlier (13 February 1929 – 30 October 2017) was a Swiss football goalkeeper who played for Switzerland in the 1954 FIFA World Cup. He also played for Neuchâtel Xamax, Servette FC, Urania Genève Sport, FC Biel-Bienne, FC Lausanne-Sport, and Étoile Carouge FC.
