= Ernst Huberty =

German-Luxembourgish sports journalist (1927–2023)

- Born: Ernest Rodolphe Huberty; 22 February 1927; Trier, Germany
- Died: 24 April 2023 (aged 96)
- Occupations: Sports journalist; television presenter
- Years active: 1950–2002
- Awards: Goldene Kamera; Herbert-Award

Ernst Huberty (born Ernest Rodolphe Huberty; 22 February 1927 – 24 April 2023) was a Luxembourgish-German sports journalist and television presenter. Huberty was best known for hosting the sports magazine Sportschau on German public broadcaster ARD, earning him the nickname "Mister Sportschau". As a commentator, he was known for his calm and objective style.

== Life and career ==
Huberty was born in Trier on 22 February 1927 to a Luxembourgish father. In 1932 he and his family moved to Koblenz. After World War II, he completed his Abitur and studied Philosophy and German studies at University of Mainz. During studies, Huberty volunteered for Koblenzer Zeitung before beginning his career as a sports journalist with regional broadcaster Südwestfunk of Baden-Baden in 1950, where he hosted a television show called "Sport am Montag" (Sports on Monday) until December 1956.

In January 1957, Huberty joined the "Hier und heute" (here and today) editorial team of Westdeutscher Rundfunk (WDR), and from 1960, he transferred to WDR's sports department. Since its inception on 4 June 1961, Huberty hosted the ARD Sportschau, a prestigious sports show in Germany, which he shaped with his friendly objectivity and unique Comb over hairstyle.

In January 1970, Huberty became the head of WDR's sports department. After 12 years, Huberty was forced to give up his position as sports chief in March 1982 due a disagreement of business expenses. Subsequently, he was transferred to WDR's third program regional broadcast. He was replaced by Heribert Faßbender.

In April 1991, Huberty joined the then newly launched pay-TV channel Premiere, and briefly commentated for one Bundesliga match in October 2002 on free-to-air channel Sat.1.

Huberty also worked as a moderator coach, having coached moderators such as Reinhold Beckmann, Johannes B. Kerner, Oliver Welke and Monica Lierhaus.

Huberty was a live commentator for many major sporting events from 1960 to 1982, including what is known as the "Game of the Century" (German: Jahrhundertspiel; Italian: Partita del secolo; Spanish: Partido del Siglo) between West Germany and Italy on 17 June 1970 at the Estadio Azteca in Mexico City. In his commentary of this match Huberty famously exclaimed "Schnellinger, of all people!" (in German: "Schnellinger! Ausgerechnet Schnellinger!"), hinting at the fact that German player Karl-Heinz Schnellinger played for Italian football club A.C. Milan, for whom he had never scored. Huberty also provided the commentary for the live broadcast of the World Cup match between West Germany and Poland on 3 July 1974, which went down in football history as the "Water Battle of Frankfurt" (German: Wasserschlacht von Frankfurt) due to heavy rain and an almost unplayable pitch, as well as the European Championship final on 20 June 1976, known as the "Night of Belgrade" (German: Nacht von Belgrad). He also commented on the DFB Cup final between Borussia Mönchengladbach and 1. FC Köln on 23 June 1973, in which Günter Netzer substituted himself in towards the end of the game before scoring the winning goal.

In 1972 Huberty was awarded the Goldene Kamera television award as "most popular sports journalist". For his lifetime achievements, he received the German Sports Journalists Award (German: Deutscher Sportjournalistenpreis; formerly: Herbert-Award) in 2011.

Huberty was married and lived in Frechen near Cologne. He died on 24 April 2023, at the age of 96.

== Awards ==
- 1972 Goldene Kamera television award as "most popular sports journalist"
- 2011 Herbert-Award for sports journalists for his lifetime achievements
