= Pieter Van den Bosch (footballer) =

Belgian footballer

Pieter Van Den Bosch
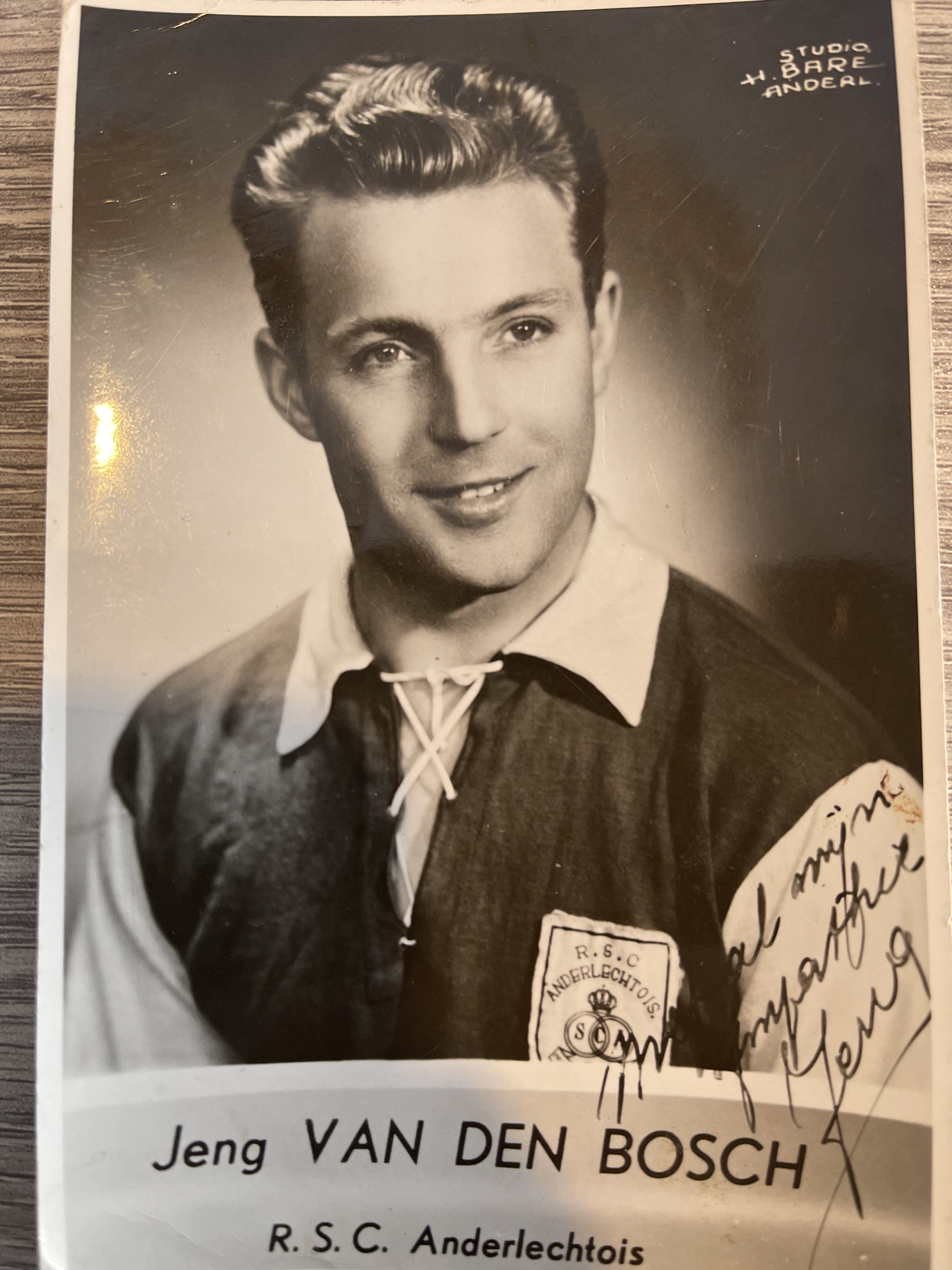

Personal information
- Date of birth: 31 October 1927
- Place of birth: Boom, Belgium
- Date of death: 31 January 2009 (aged 81)

Senior career*
Years	Team	Apps	(Gls)
1945–1951	Boom FC		
1951–1960	RSC Anderlecht		
1960–1963	RAEC Mons		
1963	SP Lebbeke		
1965–1966	FC Heist Sportief		

International career
1954	Belgium	2	(0)

Managerial career
- 1960–1962: RAEC Mons
- * Club domestic league appearances and goals

Pieter Rosalia Van Den Bosch (31 October 1927 – 31 January 2009) was a Belgian international footballer. He participated at the 1954 FIFA World Cup, alongside brother Hippolyte.
