= Luciana Marcellini =

Italian swimmer

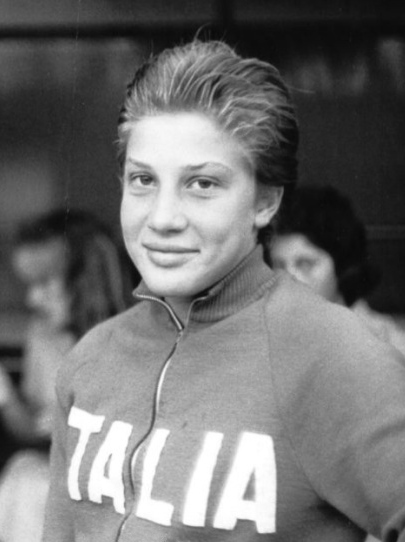

Personal information
- Born: 12 January 1948 (age 78) Rome, Italy
- Height: 1.63 m (5 ft 4 in)
- Weight: 58 kg (128 lb)

Sport
- Sport: Swimming

Luciana Marcellini (born 12 January 1948) is a retired Italian swimmer. She competed at the 1960 Summer Olympics in the 200 m breaststroke event, but was eliminated in the preliminaries. Aged 12 years and 228 days she was the youngest participant at the 1960 games.
