= Natale Nobili =

Italian footballer (1935–2021)

Personal information
- Date of birth: August 19, 1935
- Place of birth: Carate Brianza, Italy
- Date of death: 10 July 2021 (aged 85)
- Position: Goalkeeper

Senior career*
Years	Team	Apps	(Gls)
- Alessandria
- Inter Milan
- S.P.A.L.
- Pro Vercelli

Managerial career
- Caratese
- Vogherese
- Novese
- Pro Vercelli
- * Club domestic league appearances and goals

Natale Nobili (19 August 1935 – 10 July 2021) was an Italian professional football player and manager.

== Career ==
Born in Carate Brianza, Nobili played as a goalkeeper for Alessandria, Inter Milan, S.P.A.L. and Pro Vercelli.

He later managed Caratese, Vogherese, Novese and Pro Vercelli.
