= Constant Huysmans =

Belgian footballer

Personal information
- Date of birth: 11 October 1928
- Place of birth: Antwerp, Belgium
- Date of death: 16 May 2016 (aged 87)
- Height: 1.59 m (5 ft 2 1/2 in)
- Position: Defender

Senior career*
Years	Team	Apps	(Gls)
1946–1962	Beerschot VAC	?	(?)

International career
1953–1959	Belgium	22	(0)
- * Club domestic league appearances and goals

Constant Huysmans (11 October 1928 – 16 May 2016) was a Belgian former international footballer who played as a defender.

== Career ==
Born in Antwerp, Huysmans played club football for Beerschot VAC.

He earned a total of 22 caps for Belgium between 1953 and 1959, and participated at the 1954 FIFA World Cup.
