= Sergio Morin =

Italian footballer

Personal information
- Date of birth: September 16, 1931
- Place of birth: Monfalcone, Italy
- Date of death: October 12, 2010 (aged 79)
- Height: 1.75 m (5 ft 9 in)
- Position: Midfielder

Senior career*
Years	Team	Apps	(Gls)
1948–1950	Monfalcone		
1950–1952	Vigevano		
1952–1953	Internazionale	1	(0)
1953–1954	Pavia	34	(1)
1954–1956	SPAL	63	(0)
1956–1960	Napoli	90	(1)
1960–1962	Verona	40	(0)
1962–1966	Monfalcone	98	(?)
- * Club domestic league appearances and goals

Sergio Morin (September 16, 1931 in Monfalcone – October 12, 2010) was an Italian professional footballer.

== Honours ==
- Serie A champion: 1952/53.
