= Rodrigo Maroni =

Brazilian politician (born 1981)

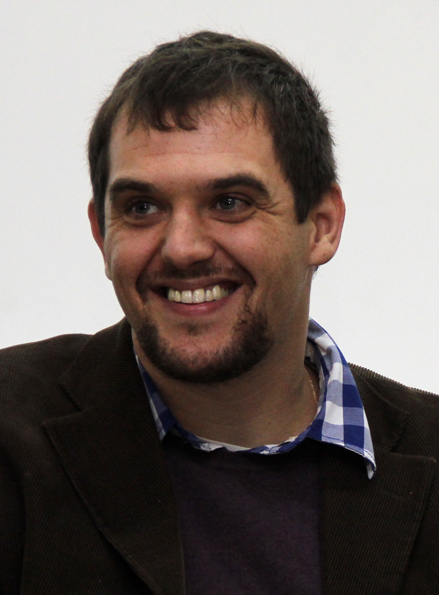
- Maroni in 2011

State Deputy for Rio Grande do Sul
- Incumbent
- Assumed office 1 February 2019

Vereador of Porto Alegre
- In office 1 January 2015 – 17 December 2018

Personal details
- Born: 21 July 1981 (age 45) Porto Alegre, Brazil
- Party: PROS (2020–); PODE (2018–2020); PL (2016–2018); PCdoB (2011–2018); PT (2007–2011); PSOL (2005–2007); PT (1998–2005)

Rodrigo Maroni (born 21 July 1981) is a Brazilian politician, as well as a yoga instructor and animal rights activist. He has spent his political career representing Rio Grande do Sul, having served in the state legislature since 2019.

== Personal life ==
Rodrigo Maroni was born on 21 July 1981 in Porto Alegre, Brazil. He identifies as a Buddhist and was a yoga instructor prior to entering politics. In 2019 he married public defender Isabel Wexel. Previously he had been in a relationship with journalist and politician Manuela d'Ávila.

Maroni identifies as an animal rights activist, a key theme in his political campaigns.

In 2017 Maroni claimed to have been a victim of an assassination attempt. While he was driving to deliver a dog from an animal shelter, a couple on a motorcycle followed him and started shooting at him. After speeding up to avoid them he ultimately crashed his car, and hid behind a group of trees until he was sure the assailants were gone.

== Political career ==
Maroni first entered politics in 1998 when joining the Workers' Party. He remained a party member until 2005.

Maroni ran for the municipal council in his home city of Porto Alegre in 2012, as a member of the Communist Party of Brazil. He won 2,861 votes but was not elected. In January 2015, he was appointed to the municipal council of Porto Alegre to fill the vacancy of fellow Communist Party member João Derly, who had been elected as a federal deputy.

In March 2016, he joined the Party of the Republic with the intention to run for mayor of Porto Alegre. However, in July 2016, federal deputy Giovani Cherini assumed the state party's leadership, removed Maroni from the municipal directory, and forced him to abandon his candidacy for mayor. In reaction, Maroni angrily classified Cherini as "a colonialist and authoritarian". In the 2016 municipal election he was reelected to the position of councilor, coming in as the fourth-place candidate with 11,770 votes.

In September 2016, Maroni courted national attention and controversy when he presented a bill proposing life imprisonment to anyone who is found guilty of cruelty to animals. He also submitted bills proposing that animal killers and rapists use electronic collars, and that humans who commit sexual violence against animals be forcibly chemically castrated. Maroni's proposals were widely criticized as unrealistic and extreme, with many legal experts noting that life sentences and forced castration were deemed illegal under the Constitution of Brazil.

In May 2017, Maroni announced that he would be running for president in the 2018 election, claiming that "animals can have their first candidate for President of the Republic". However, his campaign for president never formally materialized. In September 2017, Maroni again switched parties to join Podemos. In the 2018 elections, he was elected as a state deputy to the Legislative Assembly of Rio Grande do Sul with 26,449 votes.

In September 2019, he was elected to be the regional president of the Podemos party in the state of Rio Grande do Sul. In late November 2019 Maroni once again announced his intention to run for mayor of Porto Alegre. However, in March 2020, the national president of Podemos, Alvaro Dias, removed Maroni from his position as president of the state's party, and replaced him with Lasier Martins. After being deposed as state party's president, Maroni left the party to join the Republican Party of the Social Order.
