= Wiltrud Urselmann =

German swimmer

Wiltrud Urselman
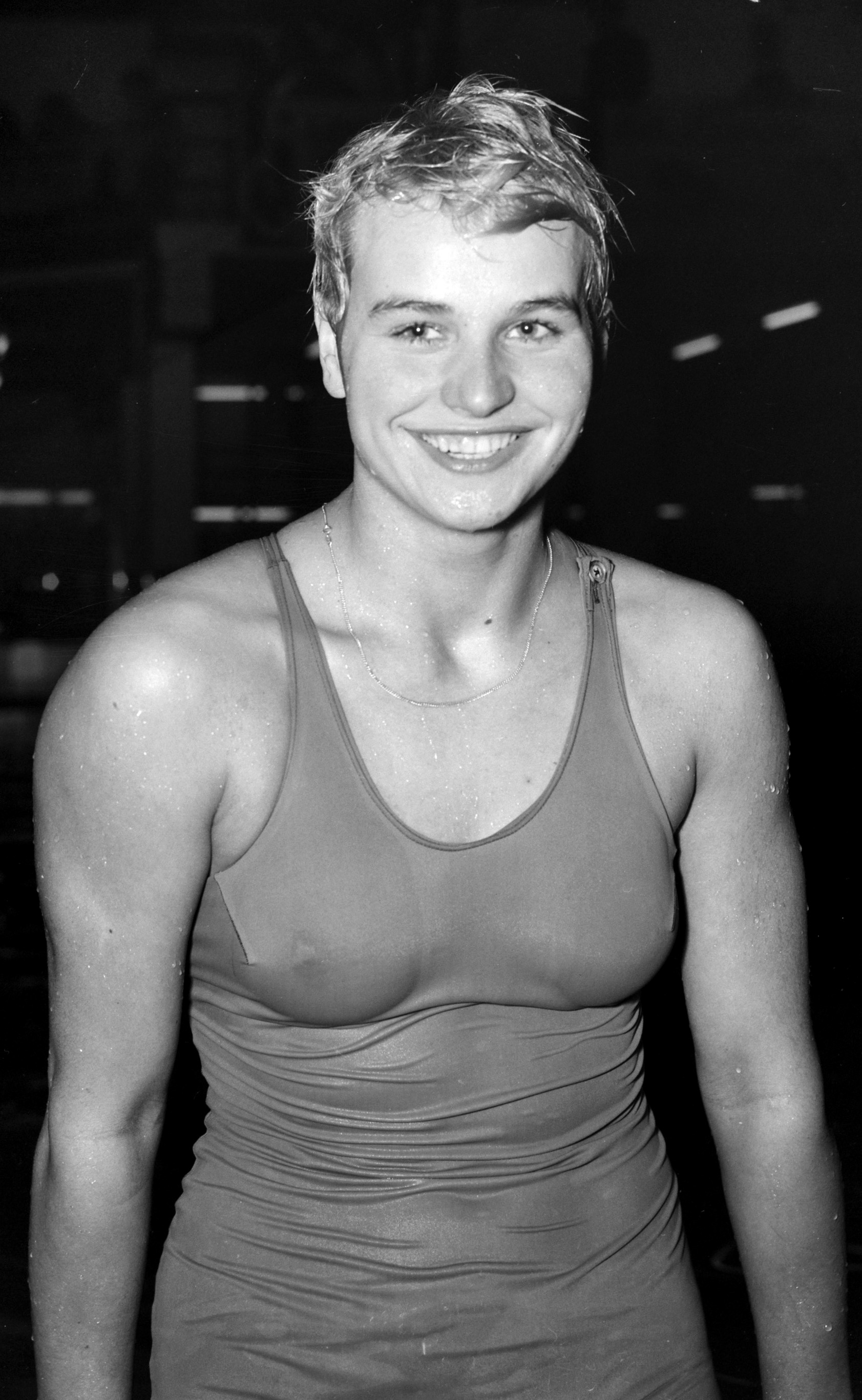
- Wiltrud Urselman in 1959

Personal information
- Born: 12 May 1942 (age 84) Krefeld, Germany
- Height: 1.75 m (5 ft 9 in)
- Weight: 73 kg (161 lb)

Sport
- Sport: Swimming
- Strokes: Breaststroke
- Club: SV Krefeld 98
Medal record
Representing Germany
Olympic Games
| Silver medal – second place | 1960 Rome | 200 m breaststroke |
Representing West Germany
European Championships
| Bronze medal – third place | 1958 Budapest | 200 m breaststroke |

Wiltrud Urselmann (German pronunciation: [ˈvɪltʁuːt ˈʊʁzl̩ˌman]; born 12 May 1942) is a German former breaststroke swimmer. In 1957 she was named the German Sportspersonality of the Year for her national achievements. She then won a bronze medal in the 200 m breaststroke at the 1958 European Aquatics Championships. On 6 June 1960 she set a new world record in the same event (2:50.2), beating the previous record of Anita Lonsbrough. Two months later, in the 1960 Summer Olympics finals, she swam even faster (2:50.0), but was beaten in the last 25 meters by Lonsbrough (2:49.5), who set a new world record.

Urselmann also competed at the 1964 Summer Olympics but, with a time of 2:53.2, failed to reach the finals.
