= Léopold Gernaey =

Belgian footballer

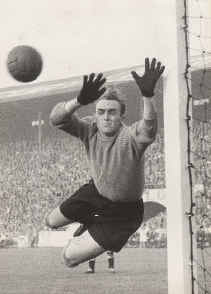

Personal information
- Full name: Léopold Andries Gernaey
- Date of birth: 25 February 1927
- Place of birth: Gistel, Belgium
- Date of death: 4 August 2005 (aged 78)
- Place of death: Oostende, Belgium
- Position: Goalkeeper

Youth career
- 1942–1947: KEG Gistel

Senior career*
Years	Team	Apps	(Gls)
1947–1957	AS Oostende		
1957–1961	Beerschot	41	(0)

International career
1953–1957	Belgium	17	(0)
- * Club domestic league appearances and goals

Léopold Andries Gernaey (25 February 1927 – 4 August 2005) was a Belgian international footballer who played as a goalkeeper.

== Career ==
Born in Gistel, Gernaey played club football for second-tier AS Oostende and top level side Beerschot.

He earned a total of 17 caps for Belgium between 1953 and 1957, and participated at the 1954 FIFA World Cup.
