= Aldo Nardi =

Italian footballer (1931-2001)

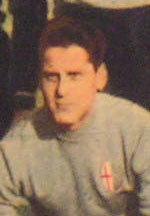

Personal information
- Date of birth: 3 March 1931
- Place of birth: Rome, Italy
- Date of death: 11 July 2001 (aged 70)
- Place of death: Alessandria, Italy
- Position: Defender

Senior career*
Years	Team	Apps	(Gls)
1948–1953	Roma	2	(0)
1953–1954	Empoli	32	(0)
1954–1955	Torino	4	(0)
1955–1961	Alessandria	133	(2)
1961–1965	Grosseto	99	(3)
- * Club domestic league appearances and goals

Aldo Nardi (3 March 1931 – 11 July 2001) was an Italian professional football player.

He played for 6 seasons (80 games, 1 goal) in the Serie A for A.S. Roma, A.C. Torino and U.S. Alessandria Calcio 1912.
