= Antonio Marcellini =

Italian footballer (1937–2010)

Personal information
- Date of birth: January 17, 1937 (age 89)
- Place of birth: Rome, Italy
- Position: Midfielder

Senior career*
Years	Team	Apps	(Gls)
1956–1957	Roma	5	(0)
1957–1958	Alessandria	21	(0)
1958–1959	Catania	31	(10)
1959–1961	Roma	3	(0)
1961–1962	Siena	33	(2)
1962–1965	Trapani	46	(?)
- * Club domestic league appearances and goals

Antonio Marcellini (January 17, 1937 – May 22, 2010) was an Italian professional football player.

Born in Rome, he played for 4 seasons (29 games, no goals) in the Serie A for A.S. Roma and U.S. Alessandria Calcio 1912.
