= Roger Vonlanthen =

Swiss footballer and manager (1930–2020)

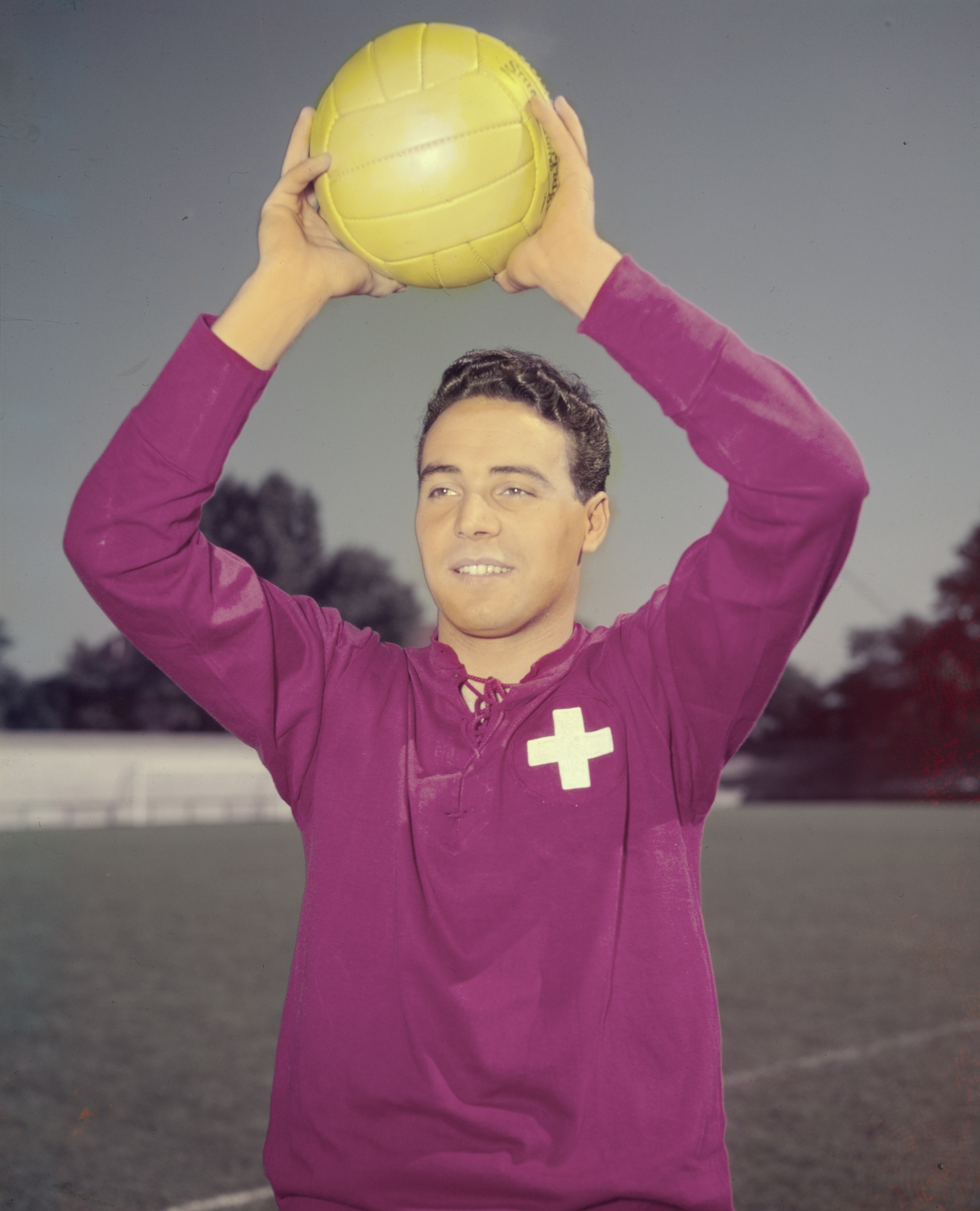
- Roger Vonlanthen in 1956

Personal information
- Date of birth: 5 December 1930
- Place of birth: Lancy, Switzerland
- Date of death: July 2020 (aged 89)
- Place of death: Onex, Switzerland
- Position: Forward

Senior career*
Years	Team	Apps	(Gls)
1951–1955	Grasshoppers		
1955–1957	Inter Milan	42	(12)
1957–1959	Alessandria	45	(10)
1959–1966	Lausanne		

International career
1951–1962	Switzerland	27	(9)

Managerial career
- 1966: Servette
- 1967–1972: Lausanne
- 1976–1977: CS Chênois
- 1977–1979: Switzerland
- * Club domestic league appearances and goals

Roger Vonlanthen (5 December 1930 – July 2020) was a Swiss football player and manager.

During his club career he played for Grasshoppers (1951–55), Inter Milan (1955–57), Alessandria (1957–59) and Lausanne (1959–66). He earned 27 caps and scored 8 goals for the Switzerland national football team from 1954 to 1966, and participated in two World Cups (1954 and 1962). Later he became a manager with Servette, Lausanne and CS Chênois and had a stint as the manager of Switzerland from 1977 to 1979.

In March 2021, it was announced Vonlanthen died the previous year, in July at the age of 89 in Onex.
