= Egisto Pandolfini =

Italian footballer (1926–2019)

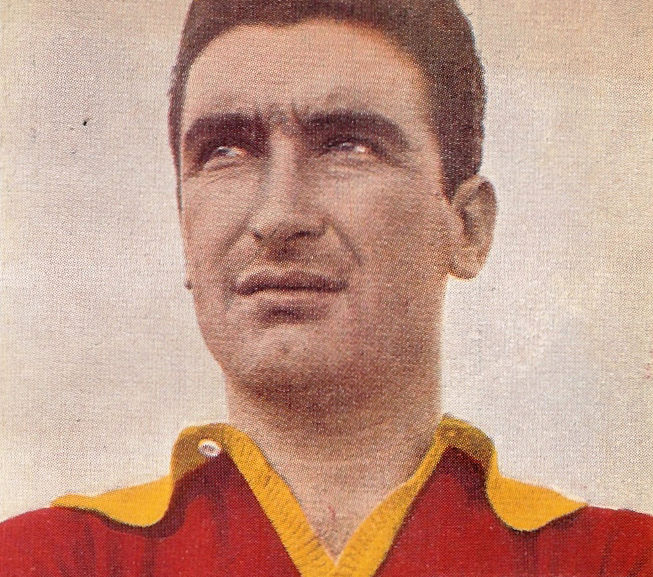
- Pandolfini with A.S. Roma

Personal information
- Full name: Egisto Pandolfini
- Date of birth: 17 February 1926
- Place of birth: Lastra a Signa, Italy
- Date of death: 29 January 2019 (aged 92)
- Place of death: Lastra a Signa
- Position: Midfielder

Senior career*
Years	Team	Apps	(Gls)
1945–1946	Fiorentina	6	(0)
1946–1947	Empoli	39	(12)
1947–1948	SPAL	31	(20)
1948–1952	Fiorentina	142	(36)
1952–1956	Roma	110	(29)
1956–1958	Internazionale	38	(8)
1958–1960	SPAL	26	(2)
1960–1962	Empoli	45	(6)
Total		437	(113)

International career
1950–1957	Italy	21	(9)
- * Club domestic league appearances and goals

Egisto Pandolfini (Italian pronunciation: [eˈdʒisto pandolˈfiːni]; 17 February 1926 – 29 January 2019) was an Italian footballer who played as a midfielder.

== Club career ==
Pandolfini was born in Lastra a Signa. He played for 12 seasons (316 games, 75 goals) in the Serie A for ACF Fiorentina, A.S. Roma, F.C. Internazionale Milano and SPAL 1907.

== International career ==
Pandolfini obtained 21 caps and scored 9 goals for the Italy national team, appearing in both the 1950 and 1954 FIFA World Cups, as well as the 1948 and 1952 editions of the Summer Olympic Games Football Tournament. He died on 29 January 2019, aged 92.
