= Fulvio Nesti =

Italian footballer (1925–1996)

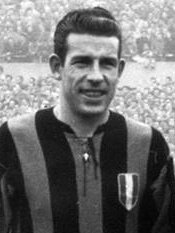

Personal information
- Full name: Fulvio Nesti
- Date of birth: 8 June 1925
- Place of birth: Lastra a Signa, Italy
- Date of death: 1 January 1996 (aged 70)
- Position: Midfielder

Senior career*
Years	Team	Apps	(Gls)
1946–1948	Scafatese		
1948–1952	SPAL	125	(5)
1952–1957	Inter	123	(6)
1957–1960	Prato	57	(0)

International career
1953–1954	Italy	5	(1)
- * Club domestic league appearances and goals

Fulvio Nesti (Italian pronunciation: [ˈfulvjo ˈnɛsti]; 8 June 1925 – 1 January 1996) was an Italian footballer who played as a midfielder.

== Club career ==
Born in Lastra a Signa, Nesti played club football for ACF Fiorentina, S.S. Scafatese Calcio 1922, SPAL 1907, F.C. Internazionale Milano, and A.C. Prato.

== International career ==
At international level, Nesti earned 5 caps and scored 1 goal for the Italy national team in 1953 and 1954, and participated in the 1954 FIFA World Cup.
