= 1963–64 AC Milan season =

Milan Associazione Calcio
1963–64 season
- President: Felice Riva
- Manager: Luis Carniglia, then Nils Liedholm
- Stadium: San Siro
- Serie A: 3rd
- Coppa Italia: Quarter-finals
- Inter-Cities Fairs Cup: Quarter-finals
- Intercontinental Cup: Runner-up
- Top goalscorer: League: Amarildo (14); All: José Altafini (18)
- Average home league attendance: 38,148
Home colours	Away colours

During the 1963–64 season Milan Associazione Calcio competed in Serie A, Coppa Italia, European Cup and Intercontinental Cup.

== Summary ==
In the 1963-1964 season, Milan started under the helm of coach Luis Carniglia, who led Real Madrid to victory in the European Cup against the Rossoneri six years earlier; the Argentine was supported by technical director Giuseppe Viani. Carniglia's adventure, however, was short: he was, in fact, sacked in March 1964 and replaced by Nils Liedholm. Strengthened by the signing of Amarildo, Milan ended the Serie A season in third place behind champions Bologna and Inter, equaling Juventus' record of the most away wins (11) in 18-team championships. In the European Cup, after beating Norrköping in the round of 16, the Rossoneri were eliminated in the quarter-finals by Real Madrid: a 2-0 victory at San Siro was not enough to overturn the 4-1 defeat suffered in Spain. Also in the Italian Cup Milan exited in the quarterfinals, this time at the hands of Fiorentina.

Furthermore, this season Milan lost the Intercontinental Cup at the Maracanã against Pelé's Santos (1-0) at the end of a play-off match made necessary after the first and the second leg had ended with a score of 4-2 for the Rossoneri and the Brazilians respectively. The two matches won by Santos were notable for the suspected doping of the Brazilians, as well as for the controversial refereeing of the Argentine Juan Regis Brozzi, who was suspected of having been corrupted by the South American club, and was later banned by his federation.

In 1963, the first official monthly magazine entirely dedicated to Milan was founded, called Forza Milan!.

== Squad ==
Note: Flags indicate national team as defined under FIFA eligibility rules; some limited exceptions apply. Players may hold more than one non-FIFA nationality.

Pos.	Nation	Player
GK	ITA	Luigi Balzarini
GK	ITA	Mario Barluzzi
GK	ITA	Claudio Mantovani
GK	ITA	Giorgio Ghezzi
DF	ITA	Gilberto Noletti
DF	ITA	Cesare Maldini (Captain)
DF	ITA	Luigi Radice (vice-captain)
DF	ITA	Mario Trebbi
DF	ITA	Nello Santin
DF	ITA	Giovanni Trapattoni
DF	ITA	Luciano Poppi
MF	ITA	Bruno Bacchetta

Pos.	Nation	Player
MF	PER	Víctor Benítez
MF	ITA	Ambrogio Pelagalli
MF	ITA	Giovanni Lodetti
MF	ITA	Mario David
MF	ITA	Gianni Rivera
MF	ITA	Eugenio Petrini
MF	BRA	Dino Sani
FW	BRA	Amarildo
FW	BRA	José Altafini
FW	ITA	Giuliano Fortunato
FW	ITA	Bruno Mora
FW	ITA	Paolo Ferrario

=== Transfers ===
In
Pos.	Name	from	Type
GK	Luigi Balzarini	Modena	-
FW	Amarildo	Botafogo	-
FW	José Germano de Sales	Genoa	-

Out
Pos.	Name	To	Type
GK	Mario Liberalato	Prato	-
DF	Attilio Bravi	Lecco	-
DF	Francesco Zagatti	-	retired
MF	Giorgio Rossano	Juventus	-
FW	Paolo Barison	Sampdoria	-
FW	Emanuele Del Vecchio	Boca Juniors	-
GK	Claudio Mantovani	Saronno	-
MF	Víctor Benítez	Messina	-

== Competitions ==
=== Serie A ===
==== League table ====
Pos	Team	Pld	W	D	L	GF	GA	GD	Pts	Qualification or relegation
1	Bologna (C)	34	22	10	2	54	18	+36	54	Qualification to European Cup (Note: Inter qualified as defending champions.)
2	Internazionale (Note: After the title tie-breaker with Bologna (2–0).)	34	23	8	3	54	21	+33	54	Qualification to European Cup
3	Milan	34	21	9	4	58	28	+30	51	Chosen for Inter-Cities Fairs Cup
4	Fiorentina	34	14	10	10	43	27	+16	38	Chosen for Inter-Cities Fairs Cup
4	Juventus	34	14	10	10	49	37	+12	38	Chosen for Inter-Cities Fairs Cup

Source: Panini
(C) Champions

==== Matches ====
15 September 1963 1	Mantova	1–4	Milan	Mantova
	Simoni 52'		8', 77', 88' Altafini; 82' Amarildo	Stadium: Stadio Danilo Martelli; Attendance: 27,248; Referee: Adami

22 September 1963 2	Milan	3–0	Messina	Milan
	Rivera 13', 31'; Amarildo 81'			Stadium: Stadio San Siro; Attendance: 43,783; Referee: Angelini

25 September 1963 3	Lazio	1–1	Milan	Roma
	Galli 26'		19' Fortunato	Stadium: Stadio Olimpico; Attendance: 41,108; Referee: Lo Bello

29 September 1963 4	Torino	0–0	Milan	Turin
				Stadium: Stadio Comunale; Attendance: 46,221; Referee: Francescon

6 October 1963 5	Milan	3–1	Genoa	Milan
	Amarildo 52'; Trebbi 69'; Mora 87'		90' Bean	Stadium: Stadio San Siro; Attendance: 39,742; Referee: Sbardella

20 October 1963 6	Bologna	2–2	Milan	Bologna
	Haller 48'; Bulgarelli 54'		74' Mora; 90' (o.g.) Capra	Stadium: Stadio Comunale; Attendance: 45,649; Referee: Adami

23 October 1963 7	Milan	3–1	Catania	Milan
	Altafini 13', 81'; Ferrario 70'		48' Prenna	Stadium: Stadio San Siro; Attendance: 23,112; Referee: Politano

27 October 1963 8	Milan	3–0	Modena	Milan
	Altafini 36', 59'; Rivera 84'			Stadium: Stadio San Siro; Attendance: 30,766; Referee: De Marchi

19 January 1964 9	Inter Milan	0–2	Milan	Milan
			13' Fortunato; 36' Rivera	Stadium: Stadio San Siro; Attendance: 75,586; Referee: Sbardella

18 December 1963 10	Lanerossi Vicenza	0–1	Milan	Vicenza
			71' Rivera	Stadium: Stadio Romeo Menti; Attendance: 11,346; Referee: Lo Bello

24 November 1963 11	Milan	2–2	Juventus	Milan
	Mora 35'; Fortunato 80'		55' Nené; 70' Sivori	Stadium: Stadio San Siro; Attendance: 72,082; Referee: Sbardella

1 December 1963 12	Milan	2–0	Atalanta	Milan
	Fortunato 2'; Mora 76'			Stadium: Stadio San Siro; Attendance: 39,418; Referee: Jonni

8 December 1963 13	Sampdoria	1–2	Milan	Genova
	da Silva 70'		39', 79' Altafini	Stadium: Stadio Luigi Ferraris; Attendance: 24,361; Referee: De Marchi

22 December 1963 14	Milan	2–1	Roma	Milan
	Sani 68'; Amarildo 73'		90' De Sisti	Stadium: Stadio San Siro; Attendance: 29,055; Referee: Rigato

29 December 1963 15	Fiorentina	2–1	Milan	Firenze
	Petris 41'; Hamrin 59'		21' Amarildo	Stadium: Stadio Comunale; Attendance: 47,707; Referee: Jonni

5 January 1964 16	Bari	0–2	Milan	Bari
			9', 24' Sani	Stadium: Stadio della Vittoria; Attendance: 35,029; Referee: De Marchi

12 January 1964 17	Milan	1–1	SPAL	Milan
	Trapattoni 67'		77' Massei	Stadium: Stadio San Siro; Attendance: 20,612; Referee: Marchese

26 January 1964 18	Milan	1–0	Mantova	Milan
	Altafini 21'			Stadium: Stadio San Siro; Attendance: 19,853; Referee: Gambarotta

2 February 1964 19	Messina	1–2	Milan	Messina
	Ghelfi 20'		3' Amarildo; 81' Rivera	Stadium: Stadio Giovanni Celeste; Attendance: 24,418; Referee: Francescon

9 February 1964 20	Milan	0–1	Lazio	Milan
			24' (o.g.) Noletti	Stadium: Stadio San Siro; Attendance: 31,024; Referee: Di Tonno

16 February 1964 21	Milan	1–1	Torino	Milan
	Amarildo 18'		65' Ferrini	Stadium: Stadio San Siro; Attendance: 34,918; Referee: Angonese

23 February 1964 22	Genoa	1–1	Milan	Genova
	Rivara 76'		76' Mora	Stadium: Stadio Luigi Ferraris; Attendance: 29,349; Referee: Lo Bello

1 March 1964 23	Milan	1–2	Bologna	Milan
	Amarildo 6'		9' Nielsen; 37' Pascutti	Stadium: Stadio San Siro; Attendance: 74,692; Referee: De Marchi

8 March 1964 24	Catania	0–1	Milan	Catania
			63' Altafini	Stadium: Stadio Cibali; Attendance: 25,489; Referee: Jonni

15 March 1964 25	Modena	0–1	Milan	Modena
			4' Rivera	Stadium: Stadio Alberto Braglia; Attendance: 27,044; Referee: Sbardella

22 March 1964 26	Milan	1–1	Inter Milan	Milan
	Altafini 59'		60' Corso	Stadium: Stadio San Siro; Attendance: 76,408; Referee: Lo Bello

29 March 1964 27	Milan	2–1	Lanerossi Vicenza	Milan
	Altafini 23'; Amarildo 40'		43' Dell'Angelo	Stadium: Stadio San Siro; Attendance: 23,112; Referee: Adami

5 April 1964 28	Juventus	1–2	Milan	Turin
	Bercellino 74'		70', 83' Amarildo	Stadium: Stadio Comunale; Attendance: 34,838; Referee: Francescon

19 April 1964 29	Atalanta	0–0	Milan	Bergamo
				Stadium: Stadio Comunale; Attendance: 22,880; Referee: De Marchi

26 April 1964 30	Milan	0–1	Sampdoria	Milan
			24' Pienti	Stadium: Stadio San Siro; Attendance: 27,857; Referee: Angelini

3 May 1964 31	Roma	2–3	Milan	Roma
	Manfredini 28'; Orlando 31'		60', 65', 75' Amarildo	Stadium: Stadio Olimpico; Attendance: 39,492; Referee: Marchese

17 May 1964 32	Milan	2–1	Fiorentina	Milan
	Mora 5', 17' (pen.)		51' Seminario	Stadium: Stadio San Siro; Attendance: 31,757; Referee: Sbardella

24 May 1964 33	Milan	2–0	Bari	Milan
	Buccione 33' (o.g.); Lodetti 43'			Stadium: Stadio San Siro; Attendance: 23,527; Referee: Righetti

31 May 1964 34	SPAL	2–4	Milan	Ferrara
	Novelli 11'; Matassini 72'		2', 81' Ferrario; 18' (o.g.) Bozzao; 46' Altafini	Stadium: Stadio Comunale; Attendance: 8,069; Referee: Bernardis

=== Coppa Italia ===
==== Quarter-finals ====
3 June 1964 1	Fiorentina	1–0	Milan	Firenze
	Nuti 87'			Stadium: Stadio Comunale; Attendance: 25,000; Referee: Varazzani

=== European Cup ===
==== Round of 16 ====
27 November 1963 1	IFK Norrköping (Sweden)	1–1	(Italy) Milan	Norrköping
	Nordqvist 59'		84' Fortunato	Stadium: Idrottsparken; Attendance: 15,400; Referee: van Leeuwen

4 December 1963 2	Milan (Italy)	5–2	(Sweden) IFK Norrköping	Milan
	Altafini 34', 38', 77'; Nordqvist 43' (o.g.); Rivera 50'		30' Martinsson; 88' (o.g.) Trebbi	Stadium: San Siro; Attendance: 14,282; Referee: Gere

==== Quarter-finals ====
29 January 1964 1	Real Madrid (Spain)	4–1	(Italy) Milan	Madrid
	Amancio 17'; Puskás 44'; Di Stéfano 59'; Gento 64'		83' Lodetti	Stadium: Santiago Bernabeu; Attendance: 105,000; Referee: Barbéran

13 February 1964 2	Milan (Italy)	2–0	(Spain) Real Madrid	Milan
	Lodetti 6'; Altafini 46'			Stadium: San Siro; Attendance: 70,491; Referee: Dienst

=== Intercontinental Cup ===
16 October 1963 1	Milan (Italy)	4–2	(Brazil) Santos	Milan
	Trapattoni 3'; Amarildo 14', 66'; Mora 81'		57', 85' (pen.) Pelé	Stadium: San Siro; Attendance: 51,917; Referee: Haberfellner

14 November 1963 2	Santos (Brazil)	4–2	(Italy) Milan	Rio de Janeiro
	Pepe 49', 71'; Almir 54'; Lima 64'		12' Altafini; 16' Mora	Stadium: Maracanã; Attendance: 140,000; Referee: Brozzi

16 November 1963 Play-off	Santos (Brazil)	1–0	(Italy) Milan	Rio de Janeiro
	Dalmo 35' (pen.)			Stadium: Maracanã; Attendance: 160,000; Referee: Brozzi

== Statistics ==
=== Squad statistics ===
Competition	Points	Home						Away						Total						GD
Competition	Points	G	W	D	L	Gs	Ga	G	W	D	L	Gs	Ga	G	W	D	L	Gs	Ga	GD
1963-64 Serie A	51	17	10	4	3	29	14	17	11	5	1	29	14	34	21	9	4	58	28	+30
1963-64 Coppa Italia	–	0	0	0	0	0	0	1	0	0	1	0	1	1	0	0	1	0	1	-1
1963-64 European Cup	–	2	2	0	0	7	2	2	0	1	1	2	5	4	2	1	1	9	7	+2
1963 Intercontinental Cup	–	1	1	0	0	4	2	2	0	0	2	2	5	3	1	0	2	6	7	-1
Total	–	20	13	4	3	40	18	22	11	6	5	33	25	42	24	10	8	73	43	+30

=== Players statistics ===
No.	Pos	Nat	Player	Total		Serie A		Coppa Italia		European Cup		Intercontinental Cup	
No.	Pos	Nat	Player	Apps	Goals	Apps	Goals	Apps	Goals	Apps	Goals	Apps	Goals
	GK	(Italy) ITA	Giorgio Ghezzi	17	-19	14	-13	0	0	1	0	2	-6
	DF	(Italy) ITA	Cesare Maldini	29	0	22	0	1	0	3	0	3	0
	DF	(Italy) ITA	Mario Trebbi	34	1	27	1	0	0	4	0	3	0
	MF	(Italy) ITA	Giovanni Lodetti	29	3	24	1	0	0	2	2	3	0
	MF	(Italy) ITA	Ambrogio Pelagalli	37	0	29	0	1	0	4	0	3	0
	MF	(Italy) ITA	Gianni Rivera	32	8	27	7	1	0	2	1	2	0
	MF	(Italy) ITA	Mario David	34	0	28	0	1	0	3	0	2	0
	MF	(Italy) ITA	Giovanni Trapattoni	33	1	28	0	0	0	2	0	3	1
	FW	(Brazil) BRA	Amarildo	39	16	31	14	1	0	4	0	3	2
	FW	(Brazil) BRA	José Altafini	38	19	30	14	1	0	4	4	3	1
	FW	(Italy) ITA	Bruno Mora	35	9	28	7	1	0	3	0	3	2
	GK	(Italy) ITA	Mario Barluzzi	15	-15	11	-8	0	0	3	-7	1	0
	MF	(Brazil) BRA	Dino Sani	23	3	20	3	0	0	3	0	0	0
	FW	(Italy) ITA	Giuliano Fortunato	22	5	17	4	0	0	4	1	1	0
	DF	(Italy) ITA	Gilberto Noletti	15	0	13	0	1	0	1	0	0	0
	GK	(Italy) ITA	Luigi Balzarini	11	-9	9	-7	1	-1	0	0	1	-1
	MF	(Italy) ITA	Bruno Bacchetta	10	0	8	0	1	0	1	0	0	0
	FW	(Italy) ITA	Paolo Ferrario	6	3	5	3	1	0	0	0	0	0
	DF	(Italy) ITA	Nello Santin	2	0	2	0	0	0	0	0	0	0
	MF	(Italy) ITA	Luciano Poppi	1	0	1	0	0	0	0	0	0	0
	MF	(Peru) PER	Víctor Benítez	1	0	0	0	0	0	0	0	1	0
	DF	(Italy) ITA	Luigi Radice	0	0	0	0	0	0	0	0	0	0
	GK	(Italy) ITA	Claudio Mantovani	0	0	0	0	0	0	0	0	0	0

== See also ==
- AC Milan

== Bibliography ==
- Almanacco illustrato del Milan, ed: 2, March 2005. Panini.
- Enrico Tosi. La storia del Milan, May 2005. Italia/Italy cid Tosi.
- Milan. Sempre con te, December 2009. Mondadori. 2009. ISBN 978-88-04-59118-4.
