= 1962–63 AC Milan season =

Milan Associazione Calcio
1962–63 season
- President: Andrea Rizzoli
- Manager: Nereo Rocco; Giuseppe Viani (as Technical Director)
- Stadium: San Siro
- Serie A: 3rd
- Coppa Italia: Eightfinals
- European Cup: Winners (in European Cup)
- 1963 French- Italian Friendship Cup: Runners-up
- Top goalscorer: League: José Altafini (11); All: Altafini (31)
- Average home league attendance: 43,614
Home colours	Away colours

During the 1962–63 season Associazione Calcio Milan competed in Serie A, Coppa Italia, European Cup and Friendship Cup.

== Summary ==
Before the starting of the season "Associazione Calcio Milan" changed its denomination to "Milan Associazione Calcio" and moved its headquarters away from via Andegari 4 to via Gaetano Donizetti 24. During the 1962–63 season the players to reinforce the team were Peruvian defender Víctor Benítez, from Boca Juniors, midfielder Giuliano Fortunato, from Lanerossi Vicenza, right winger Bruno Mora, from Juventus, in exchange for Sandro Salvadore, and Brazilian forward José Germano, the first ever black footballer to play in Italy, loaned out to Genoa after few weeks.

In Serie A the team finished in a decent third place, 6 points behind champions Inter. Meanwhile, in the Coppa Italia the club was defeated in the round of 16.

However, the club made history in the European Cup. The first round against Union Luxembourg was cleared by the squad with a famous 14–0 aggregate scoreline, with Altafini scoring five goals in the second match of the series. In the round of 16, the next rivals were English champions Ipswich Town, defeated thanks to a 3–0 home score, followed by a 2–1 defeat in England. In the quarterfinals Turkish squad Galatasaray was defeated in both matches and also Scottish team Dundee F.C. with aggregate scores of 8–1 and 5–2 respectively.

In the 1963 European Cup Final the rival was Sport Lisboa e Benfica, back-to-back champions the previous two seasons, in a match played at Wembley Stadium. The squad closed the first half of the match with a 1–0 defeat thanks to a superb bicycle-kick goal from Eusébio. In the second half Altafini, with a pass from Rivera, scored two times against Portuguese goalkeeper Costa Pereira. Captain Cesare Maldini lifted the European Cup trophy. Also, Milan was the first Italian club to win the tournament and the third ever, after Real Madrid and Benfica after seven editions.

Altafini was the topscorer of the competition with a record of 14 goals, not surpassed until 2003 by Ruud van Nistelrooy and in 2012 by Lionel Messi, which was only broken during the 2013–14 season by Cristiano Ronaldo, who managed 17 goals.

After nine years President Andrea Rizzoli left the club to Felice Riva with four league titles and one Latin Cup in the trophy room. Also, he erected Milanello, the training clubhouse in the province of Varese. Manager Nereo Rocco left the club and signed an agreement with Torino.

== Squad ==
Note: Flags indicate national team as defined under FIFA eligibility rules; some limited exceptions apply. Players may hold more than one non-FIFA nationality.

Pos.	Nation	Player
GK	ITA	Mario Barluzzi
GK	ITA	Giorgio Ghezzi
GK	ITA	Mario Liberalato
GK	ITA	Claudio Mantovani
DF	ITA	Attilio Bravi
DF	ITA	Cesare Maldini (Captain)
DF	ITA	Luigi Radice (vice-Captain)
DF	ITA	Giovanni Trapattoni
DF	ITA	Mario Trebbi
DF	ITA	Francesco Zagatti
MF	PER	Víctor Benítez
MF	ITA	Mario David
MF	ITA	Giovanni Lodetti
MF	ITA	Gilberto Noletti

Pos.	Nation	Player
MF	ITA	Ambrogio Pelagalli
MF	ITA	Giuseppe Italo Redaelli
MF	ITA	Gianni Rivera
MF	ITA	Giorgio Rossano
MF	BRA	Dino Sani
FW	BRA	José Altafini
FW	ITA	Paolo Barison
FW	BRA	Emanuele Del Vecchio
FW	ITA	Paolo Ferrario
FW	ITA	Giuliano Fortunato
FW	BRA	Germano
FW	ITA	Bruno Mora
FW	ITA	Gino Pivatelli

=== Transfers ===
In
Pos.	Name	from	Type
GK	Mario Barluzzi	Catania Calcio	–
MF	Víctor Benítez	Boca Juniors	–
FW	Giuliano Fortunato	Lanerossi	–
FW	José Germano de Sales	Flamengo	–
GK	Claudio Mantovani	Marzotto Valdagno	–
FW	Bruno Mora	Juventus	–
DF	Gilberto Noletti	S.S. Lazio	–
MF	Giorgio Rossano	Juventus	–

Out
Pos.	Name	To	Type
GK	Luciano Alfieri	Lecce	–
FW	Bruno Beretti	Rizzoli Milano	–
FW	Oliviero Conti	Modena	–
FW	Giancarlo Danova	Torino	–
FW	Paolo Ferrario	Monza	–
FW	José Germano de Sales	Genoa	–
MF	Antonio Pasinato	Lecce	–
FW	Orlando Rozzoni	Lazio	–
DF	Sandro Salvadore	Juventus	–
MF	Sergio Tenente	Alessandria	–

== Competitions ==
=== Serie A ===
==== League table ====
Pos	Team	Pld	W	D	L	GF	GA	GD	Pts	Qualification or relegation
1	Internazionale (C)	34	19	11	4	56	20	+36	49	Qualification to European Cup
2	Juventus	34	18	9	7	50	25	+25	45	Chosen for Inter-Cities Fairs Cup
3	Milan	34	15	13	6	53	27	+26	43	Qualification to European Cup (Note: Qualified as defending champions)
4	Bologna	34	17	8	9	58	39	+19	42	
5	Roma	34	13	14	7	57	32	+25	40	Chosen for Inter-Cities Fairs Cup

Source: Panini
(C) Champions

==== Matches ====
16 September 1962 1	Milan	3–3	Venezia	Milan
	Rivera 35'; Germano 50', 68'	Report	10' Raffin; 60', 85' Tesconi	Stadium: Stadio San Siro; Attendance: 44,664; Referee: Carlo Gambarotta

23 September 1962 2	Napoli	1–5	Milan	Naples
	Tacchi 2'	Report	1', 81' Rivera; 74' Mora; 76' Barison; 88' Altafini	Stadium: Stadio San Paolo; Attendance: 59,754; Referee: Giuseppe Adami

30 September 1962 3	Milan	0–0	Atalanta	Milan
		Report		Stadium: Stadio San Siro; Attendance: 67,737; Referee: Pietro Bonetto

7 October 1962 4	Milan	0–0	Fiorentina	Milan
		Report		Stadium: Stadio San Siro; Attendance: 60,396; Referee: Giuseppe Adami

14 October 1962 5	Lanerossi Vicenza	2–0	Milan	Vicenza
	Puia 14'; Vastola 57'	Report		Stadium: Stadio Romeo Menti; Attendance: 16,117; Referee: Concetto Lo Bello

21 October 1962 6	Milan	1–1	Inter	Milan
	Pivatelli 62'	Report	45' Maschio	Stadium: Stadio San Siro; Attendance: 61,100; Referee: Giuseppe Adami

28 October 1962 7	Sampdoria	2–1	Milan	Genoa
	Bergamaschi 58'; Toro 80'	Report	42' Pivatelli	Stadium: Stadio Luigi Ferraris; Attendance: 17,974; Referee: Iginio Rigato

1 November 1962 8	Milan	3–1	Bologna	Milan
	Del Vecchio 34'; Rivera 36'; Altafini 67'	Report	77' Pascutti	Stadium: Stadio San Siro; Attendance: 69,955; Referee: Cesare Jonni

8 November 1962 9	Modena	2–2	Milan	Modena
	Giorgis 48'; Pagliari 89'	Report	23' Del Vecchio; 50' Mora	Stadium: Stadio Comunale; Attendance: 26,355; Referee: Francesco Francescon

18 November 1962 10	Juventus	1–0	Milan	Turin
	Sivori 36'	Report		Stadium: Stadio Comunale; Attendance: 51,308; Referee: Cesare Jonni

25 November 1962 11	Milan	2–2	Mantova	Milan
	Sani 55'; Rivera 64' (rig)	Report	24', 42' Geiger	Stadium: Stadio San Siro; Attendance: 36,656; Referee: Gastone Roversi

9 December 1962 12	Roma	0–1	Milan	Rome
		Report	55' Altafini	Stadium: Stadio Olimpico; Attendance: 46,037; Referee: Iginio Rigato

16 December 1962 13	Milan	2–1	Torino	Milan
	Fortunato 17'; Del Vecchio 82'	Report	86' Hitchens	Stadium: Stadio San Siro; Attendance: 36,125; Referee: Carlo Gambarotta

23 December 1962 14	Genoa	0–1	Milan	Genoa
		Report	77' Sani	Stadium: Stadio Luigi Ferraris; Attendance: 25,164; Referee: Cesare Jonni

30 December 1962 15	SPAL	0–0	Milan	Ferrara
		Report		Stadium: Stadio Comunale; Attendance: 15,425; Referee: Aurelio Angonese

6 January 1963 16	Milan	0–0	Catania	Milan
		Report		Stadium: Stadio San Siro; Attendance: 30,263; Referee: Francesco De Robbio

13 January 1963 17	Milan	2–0	Palermo	Milan
	Pivatelli 12'; Mora 19'	Report		Stadium: Stadio San Siro; Attendance: 24,287; Referee: Alessandro D'Agostini

20 January 1963 18	Venezia	0–2	Milan	Venice
	Grossi 66'; Mencacci 88'	Report	24' Rivera	Stadium: Stadio Pier Luigi Penzo; Attendance: 15,532; Referee: Concetto Lo Bello
Note:

27 January 1963 19	Milan	0–1	Napoli	Milan
		Report	24' Corelli	Stadium: Stadio San Siro; Attendance: 39,142; Referee: Giuseppe Adami

3 February 1963 20	Atalanta	2–2	Milan	Bergamo
	Domenghini 33'; Calvanese 67'	Report	6' (o.g.) Colombo; 66' Rivera	Stadium: Stadio Comunale; Attendance: 16,620; Referee: Francesco Francescon

10 February 1963 21	Fiorentina	0–1	Milan	Florence
		Report	12' Altafini	Stadium: Stadio Comunale; Attendance: 27,455; Referee: Bruno De Marchi

17 February 1963 22	Milan	6–1	Lanerossi	Milan
	Fortunato 4', 30'; Sani 15'; Lodetti 31'; Mora 35'; Altafini 54'	Report	72' Vinicio	Stadium: Stadio San Siro; Attendance: 6,837; Referee: Gennaro Marchese

24 February 1963 23	Inter	1–1	Milan	Milan
	Mazzola 1'	Report	78' Sani	Stadium: Stadio San Siro; Attendance: 71,159; Referee: Concetto Lo Bello

3 March 1963 24	Milan	1–1	Sampdoria	Milan
	Altafini 77'	Report	38' Cucchiaroni	Stadium: Stadio San Siro; Attendance: 26,125; Referee: Alessandro D'Agostini

10 March 1963 25	Bologna	1–2	Milan	Bologna
	Nielsen 18'	Report	8' Altafini; 29' Rivera	Stadium: Stadio Renato Dall'Ara; Attendance: 29,639; Referee: Carlo Gambarotta

17 March 1963 26	Milan	4–0	Modena	Milan
	Mora 12' (rig); Altafini 52'; Sani 65'; Barison 79'	Report		Stadium: Stadio San Siro; Attendance: 33,565; Referee: Piero Angelini

31 March 1963 27	Milan	0–0	Juventus	Milan
		Report		Stadium: Stadio San Siro; Attendance: 77,746; Referee: Cesare Jonni

7 April 1963 28	Mantova	1–3	Milan	Mantua
	Mazzero 36'	Report	14' Benitez; 63' Rivera; 79' Sani	Stadium: Stadio Danilo Martelli; Attendance: 24,347; Referee: Antonio Sbardella

14 April 1963 29	Milan	0–1	Roma	Milan
		Report	22' Angelillo	Stadium: Stadio San Siro; Attendance: 45,327; Referee: Aurelio Angonese

21 April 1963 30	Torino	0–0	Milan	Turin
		Report		Stadium: Stadio Comunale; Attendance: 20,188; Referee: Antonio Di Tonno

28 April 1963 31	Milan	1–0	Genoa	Milan
	Altafini 70'	Report		Stadium: Stadio San Siro; Attendance: 24,483; Referee: Antonio Sbardella

5 May 1963 32	Milan	4–0	SPAL	Milan
	Rivera 2'; Fortunato 41'; Altafini 42'; David 46'	Report		Stadium: Stadio San Siro; Attendance: 25,544; Referee: Iginio Rigato

19 May 1963 33	Catania	1–0	Milan	Catania
	Petroni 16'	Report		Stadium: Stadio Cibali; Attendance: 14,551; Referee: Aurelio Angonese

26 May 1963 34	Palermo	1–3	Milan	Palermo
	Maggioni 2'	Report	28' Altafini; 60' Barison; 90' Rossano	Stadium: Stadio La Favorita; Attendance: 12,910; Referee: Fabio Monti

=== Coppa Italia ===
==== Round of 32 ====
9 September 1962	Parma	0–1	Milan	Parma
			88' Altafini	Stadium: Stadio Ennio Tardini; Attendance: 12,000; Referee: Pietro Bonetto

==== Eightfinals ====
5 December 1962	Milan	0–1	Sampdoria	Milan
			38' Toschi	Stadium: Stadio San Siro; Attendance: 3,423; Referee: Politano

=== European Cup ===
==== Round of 32 ====
12 September 1962 1	Milan (Italy)	8–0	Union Luxembourg	Milan
	Altafini 8', 11', 28', 44', 67'; Rivera 34', 43'; Germano 72'			Stadium: Stadio San Siro; Attendance: 35,000; Referee: (Czechoslovakia) Heymann

19 September 1962 2	Union Luxembourg	0–6	(Italy) Milan	Luxembourg
			7', 39' Rossano; 34', 42', 90' Altafini; 58' Pivatelli	Stadium: Stadio Josy Barthel; Attendance: 5,000; Referee: (Czechoslovakia) Bucheli

==== Round of 16 ====
14 November 1962 1	Milan (Italy)	3–0	(England) Ipswich Town	Milan
	Barison 8', 13'; Sani 64'			Stadium: Stadio San Siro; Attendance: 10,000; Referee: (Czechoslovakia) Dienst

28 November 1962 2	Ipswich Town (England)	2–1	(Italy) Milan	Ipswich
	Crawford 79'; Blackwood 86'		62' Barison	Stadium: Portman Road; Attendance: 30,000; Referee: (Belgium) Blavier

==== Quarter-finals ====
23 January 1963 1	Galatasaray (Turkey)	1–3	(Italy) Milan	Istanbul
	Ugur 4'		34' (rig) Mora; 38' Barison; 76' Altafini	Stadium: Ali Sami Yen; Attendance: 25,000; Referee: (Austria) Friedrich Seipelt

13 March 1963 2	Milan (Italy)	5–0	(Turkey) Galatasaray	Milan
	Pivatelli 11', 42'; Altafini 50', 66', 70'			Stadium: Stadio San Siro; Attendance: 20,000; Referee: (Austria) Stohl

==== Semi-finals ====
24 April 1963 1	Milan (Italy)	5–1	(Scotland) Dundee F.C.	Milan
	Sani 3'; Barison 47', 76'; Mora 52', 81'		22' Cousin	Stadium: Stadio San Siro; Attendance: 75,000; Referee: (Spain) Caballero

1 May 1963 2	Dundee F.C. (Scotland)	1–0	(Italy) Milan	Dundee
	Gilzean 81'			Stadium: Dens Park; Attendance: 40,000; Referee: (Belgium) Van Nuffel

==== Final ====
22 May 1963	Benfica (Portugal)	1–2	(Italy) Milan	London
	18' Eusébio		Altafini 58', 66'	Stadium: Wembley Stadium; Attendance: 45,000; Referee: (England) Holland

=== Friendship Cup ===
==== Quarter-finals ====
2 June 1963	RC Lens (France)	1–3	(Italy) Milan	Lens
	Oudjani 70'		8' Paolo Barison; 42' Altafini; 51' (pen.) David	Stadium: Stade Bollaert-Delelis; Attendance: 22,000; Referee: Roversi

8 June 1963	Milan (Italy)	2–0	(France) RC Lens	Milan
	Altafini 33'; Sani 85'			Stadium: San Siro; Attendance: 2,000; Referee: (France) Faucheux

==== Semi-finals ====
13 June 1963	Olympique Lyonnais (France)	2–4	(Italy) Milan	Lyon
	Rivoire 79'; Nurenberg 80'		7', 59' Altafini; 49' (pen.) Mora; 63' Trapattoni	Stadium: Stade de Gerland; Attendance: 20,000; Referee: (France) Guinnard

==== Final ====
16 June 1963	Milan (Italy)	1–2	(Italy) Genoa	Milan
	Altafini 30'		68', 80' Dal Monte	Stadium: San Siro; Attendance: 18,000; Referee: Adami

== Statistics ==
=== Squad statistics ===
Competition	Points	Home						Away						Total						GD
Competition	Points	G	W	D	L	Gs	Ga	G	W	D	L	Gs	Ga	G	W	D	L	Gs	Ga	GD
1962-63 Serie A	43	17	7	8	2	29	12	17	8	5	4	24	15	34	15	13	6	53	27	+26
1962-63 Coppa Italia	–	1	0	0	1	0	1	1	1	0	0	1	0	2	1	0	1	1	1	0
1962-63 Coppa dell'Amicizia	–	2	1	0	1	3	2	2	2	0	0	7	3	4	3	0	1	10	5	+5
1962-63 European Cup	–	5	5	0	0	23	2	4	2	0	2	10	4	9	7	0	2	33	6	+27
Total	–	25	13	8	4	55	17	24	13	5	6	42	22	49	26	13	10	97	39	+58

=== Players statistics ===
No.	Pos	Nat	Player	Total		Serie A		Coppa Italia		Coppa dell'amicizia		European Cup	
No.	Pos	Nat	Player	Apps	Goals	Apps	Goals	Apps	Goals	Apps	Goals	Apps	Goals
	GK	(Italy) ITA	Ghezzi	34	-19	26	-19	1	0	0	0	7	0
	DF	(Italy) ITA	Maldini	43	0	31	0	1	0	2	0	9	0
	DF	(Italy) ITA	Radice	29	0	23	0	1	0	0	0	5	0
	DF	(Italy) ITA	Trapattoni	41	1	30	0	2	0	1	1	8	0
	DF	(Italy) ITA	Trebbi	36	0	23	0	2	0	4	0	7	0
	MF	(Italy) ITA	David	40	2	28	1	0	0	4	1	8	0
	MF	(Italy) ITA	Rivera	34	11	27	9	0	0	0	0	7	2
	MF	(Brazil) BRA	Sani	33	9	23	6	1	0	3	1	6	2
	FW	(Italy) ITA	Pivatelli	32	6	22	3	1	0	2	0	7	3
	FW	(Italy) ITA	Mora	34	9	24	5	0	0	3	1	7	3
	FW	(Brazil) BRA	Altafini	46	31	31	11	2	1	4	5	9	14
	GK	(Italy) ITA	Barluzzi	7	-2	3	-2	1	0	3	0	0	0
	FW	(Italy) ITA	Barison	27	10	14	3	2	0	4	1	7	6
	FW	(Italy) ITA	Fortunato	16	4	13	4	1	0	2	0	0	0
	MF	(Peru) PER	Benitez	16	1	12	1	1	0	0	0	3	0
	MF	(Italy) ITA	Pelagalli	22	0	12	0	2	0	4	0	4	0
	MF	(Brazil) BRA	Lodetti	15	1	10	1	1	0	4	0	0	0
	FW	(Italy) ITA	Del Vecchio	10	3	9	3	1	0	0	0	0	0
	GK	(Italy) ITA	Liberalato	8	-6	5	-6	0	0	1	0	2	0
	MF	(Italy) ITA	Rossano	6	3	3	1	1	0	1	0	1	2
	DF	(Italy) ITA	Bravi	4	0	3	0	0	0	1	0	0	0
	FW	(Brazil) BRA	Germano	5	3	2	2	1	0	0	0	2	1
	FW	(Italy) ITA	Ferrario	1	0	0	0	0	0	1	0	0	0
	MF	(Italy) ITA	Mantovani	1	0	0	0	0	0	1	0	0	0
	MF	(Italy) ITA	Noletti	1	0	0	0	0	0	1	0	0	0
	MF	(Italy) ITA	Redaelli	1	0	0	0	0	0	1	0	0	0
	DF	(Italy) ITA	Zagatti	1	0	0	0	1	0	0	0	0	0

- Source: http://calcio-seriea.net/tabellini/1962/9153/

== See also ==
- A.C. Milan

== Bibliography ==
- Almanacco illustrato del Milan, 2nd edition, March 2005. Panini.
- Almanacco illustrato del Milan, 1st edition, 1999. Panini.
