= 1965–66 AC Milan season =

Milan Associazione Calcio
1965–66 season
- President: Felice Riva, then Federico Sordillo, then Luigi Carraro
- Manager: Nils Liedholm, then Giovanni Cattozzo
- Stadium: San Siro
- Serie A: 7th
- Coppa Italia: Quarter-finals
- Inter-Cities Fairs Cup: Round of 16
- Top goalscorer: League: Angelo Benedicto Sormani (21); All: Angelo Benedicto Sormani (24)
- Average home league attendance: 37,743
Home colours	Away colours

During the 1965–66 season Milan Associazione Calcio competed in Serie A, Coppa Italia and Inter-Cities Fairs Cup.

== Summary ==
In the summer transfer market session of 1965, Milan lost Mario David and José Altafini (to Sampdoria and Napoli respectively) and signed Angelo Sormani, Karl-Heinz Schnellinger and Antonio Angelillo arriving from Sampdoria and Rome.

The squad improved their placement in the Fairs Cup compared to the previous season by reaching the round of 16, from which they were eliminated by draw at the end of the extra time of the play-off against English side Chelsea. In the league, on the other hand, they finished seventh, qualifying for the Mitropa Cup the following year, while in the Coppa Italia they were eliminated in the quarter-finals by Fiorentina.

More than for sporting results, the year was decidedly eventful for what happened on the managerial side. On 8 October 1965, president Felice Riva was arrested for the bankruptcy of his cotton mills company. Federico Sordillo took over as regent and remained in office until 19 April 1966, when Luigi Carraro took over the club.

At the end of the season, Cesare Maldini, followed by defender Mario Trebbi, moved to Torino after a twelve-year career with Milan. The captain's armband then passed to Gianni Rivera.

== Squad ==
Note: Flags indicate national team as defined under FIFA eligibility rules; some limited exceptions apply. Players may hold more than one non-FIFA nationality.

Pos.	Nation	Player
GK	ITA	Luigi Balzarini
GK	ITA	Mario Barluzzi
GK	ITA	Claudio Mantovani
DF	ITA	Alberto Grossetti
DF	ITA	Luigi Maldera
DF	ITA	Cesare Maldini
DF	ITA	Gilberto Noletti
DF	ITA	Mario Trebbi
DF	ITA	Nello Santin
DF	FRG	Karl-Heinz Schnellinger
DF	ITA	Giovanni Trapattoni (vice-captain)
MF	ITA	Urano Benigni
MF	ITA	Fausto Daolio

Pos.	Nation	Player
MF	ITA	Ambrogio Pelagalli
MF	ITA	Giovanni Lodetti
MF	ITA	Sergio Maddè
MF	ITA	Gianni Rivera (Captain)
MF	ITA	Nevio Scala
FW	BRA	Amarildo
FW	ARG	Antonio Angelillo
FW	ITA	Giuliano Fortunato
FW	ITA	Bruno Mora
FW	ITA	Paolo Ferrario
FW	ITA	Angelo Paina
FW	ITA	Angelo Benedicto Sormani

=== Transfers ===
In
Pos.	Name	from	Type
FW	Antonio Angelillo	Roma	-
MF	Urano Benigni	Pistoiese	-
MF	Sergio Maddè	Alessandria	-
MF	Giorgio Maioli	Foggia	-
MF	Nevio Scala	Roma	-
DF	Karl-Heinz Schnellinger	Roma	-
FW	Angelo Benedicto Sormani	Sampdoria	-

Out
Pos.	Name	To	Type
FW	José Altafini	Napoli	-
MF	Bruno Bacchetta	Genoa	-
MF	Víctor Benítez	Roma	-
FW	Aquilino Bonfanti	Lecco	-
MF	Mario David	Sampdoria	-
FW	Paolo Ferrario	Varese	-
FW	José Germano de Sales	Palmeiras	-
FW	Pierino Prati	Salernitana	-

== Competitions ==
=== Serie A ===
==== League table ====
Pos	Team	Pld	W	D	L	GF	GA	GD	Pts	Qualification or relegation
5	Juventus	34	13	16	5	38	23	+15	42	Chosen for Inter-Cities Fairs Cup
6	Vicenza	34	13	14	7	44	34	+10	40	
7	Milan	34	13	12	9	43	33	+10	38	
8	Roma	34	13	10	11	28	31	−3	36	
9	Brescia	34	12	8	14	43	44	−1	32	

Source: Panini

==== Matches ====
6 September 1965 1	Lazio	0–0	Milan	Rome
				Stadium: Stadio Olimpico; Attendance: 26,956; Referee: De Marchi

12 September 1965 2	Milan	1–0	Foggia	Milan
	Sormani 71'			Stadium: Stadio San Siro; Attendance: 38,249; Referee: Angonese

19 September 1965 3	Brescia	0–3	Milan	Brescia
			65', 69' Sormani; 82' Mora	Stadium: Stadio Mario Rigamonti; Attendance: 34,441; Referee: Varazzani

26 September 1965 4	Milan	2–0	Sampdoria	Milan
	Sormani 10'; Mora 80'			Stadium: Stadio San Siro; Attendance: 34,077; Referee: Righetti

3 October 1965 5	SPAL	1–1	Milan	Ferrara
	Massei 22' (pen.)		37' Rivera	Stadium: Stadio Comunale; Attendance: 16,771; Referee: Lo Bello

10 October 1965 6	Milan	4–1	Napoli	Milan
	Panzanato 3' (aut); Rivera 12', 57'; Noletti 84'		62' Altafini	Stadium: Stadio San Siro; Attendance: 68,090; Referee: Monti

17 October 1965 7	Fiorentina	1–0	Milan	Florence
	Morrone 86'			Stadium: Stadio Comunale; Attendance: 45,600; Referee: Bernardis

24 October 1965 8	Milan	2–2	Cagliari	Milan
	Sormani 62'; Lodetti 72'		29' Rizzo; 48' Gallardo	Stadium: Stadio San Siro; Attendance: 33,834; Referee: De Marchi

14 November 1965 9	Milan	3–1	Varese	Milan
	Sormani 25', 39', 71'		86' Maroso	Stadium: Stadio San Siro; Attendance: 31,732; Referee: De Robbio

21 November 1965 10	Inter Milan	1–1	Milan	Milan
	Domenghini 31'		57' Amarildo	Stadium: Stadio San Siro; Attendance: 75,644; Referee: Lo Bello

28 November 1965 11	Milan	3–1	Roma	Milan
	Rivera 52'; Sormani 66'; Mora 87'		71' Spanio	Stadium: Stadio San Siro; Attendance: 33,138; Referee: Angonese

12 December 1965 12	Bologna	4–1	Milan	Bologna
	Pascutti 23'; Perani 34'; Nielsen 61'; Haller 72'		80' Rivera	Stadium: Stadio Comunale; Attendance: 38,598; Referee: Lo Bello

19 December 1965 13	Milan	2–1	Juventus	Milan
	Sormani 55', 88'		80' Chinesinho	Stadium: Stadio San Siro; Attendance: 60,733; Referee: D'Agostini

26 December 1965 14	Torino	0–1	Milan	Turin
			67' Rivera	Stadium: Stadio Comunale; Attendance: 27,115; Referee: Bernardis

2 January 1966 15	Milan	1–0	Atalanta	Milan
	Sormani 43'			Stadium: Stadio San Siro; Attendance: 35,556; Referee: Marchiori

9 January 1966 16	Milan	1–1	Lanerossi Vicenza	Milan
	Sormani 79'		57' Vinicio	Stadium: Stadio San Siro; Attendance: 24,662; Referee: Vitullo

16 January 1966 17	Catania	1–1	Milan	Catania
	Fanello 81'		18' Sormani	Stadium: Stadio Cibali; Attendance: 22,458; Referee: Francescon

9 March 1966 18	Milan	0–2	Lazio	Milan
			24' Governato; 51' D'Amato	Stadium: Stadio San Siro; Attendance: 23,316; Referee: Bernardis

30 January 1966 19	Foggia	0–0	Milan	Foggia
				Stadium: Stadio Pino Zaccheria; Attendance: 29,103; Referee: Lo Bello

6 February 1966 20	Milan	2–1	Brescia	Milan
	Sormani 37' (pen.); Angelillo 57'		74' Pagani	Stadium: Stadio San Siro; Attendance: 29,670; Referee: De Marchi

13 February 1966 21	Sampdoria	1–2	Milan	Genoa
	Frustalupi 77'		32' Maddè; 57' Lodetti	Stadium: Stadio Luigi Ferraris; Attendance: 13,045; Referee: D'Agostini

20 February 1966 22	Milan	1–1	SPAL	Milan
	Rivera 62'		88' Muzzio	Stadium: Stadio San Siro; Attendance: 20,923; Referee: Angonese

27 February 1966 23	Napoli	1–0	Milan	Naples
	Sivori 88'			Stadium: Stadio San Paolo; Attendance: 75,539; Referee: D'Agostini

6 March 1966 24	Milan	1–2	Fiorentina	Milan
	Sormani 39'		3', 62' Merlo	Stadium: Stadio San Siro; Attendance: 49,338; Referee: Gonella

13 March 1966 25	Cagliari	1–2	Milan	Cagliari
	Longoni 55'		54' (o.g.) Vescovi; 55' Fortunato	Stadium: Stadio Amsicora; Attendance: 24,389; Referee: De Marchi

27 March 1966 26	Varese	0–0	Milan	Varese
				Stadium: Stadio Franco Ossola; Attendance: 15,071; Referee: Di Tonno

3 April 1966 27	Milan	1–2	Inter Milan	Milan
	Amarildo 32'		8' Bedin; 64' Domenghini	Stadium: Stadio San Siro; Attendance: 76,491; Referee: Lo Bello

10 April 1966 28	Roma	1–0	Milan	Rome
	Tomasin 80'			Stadium: Stadio Olimpico; Attendance: 29,495; Referee: Angonese

17 April 1966 29	Milan	1–1	Bologna	Milan
	Sormani 49'		47' Pascutti	Stadium: Stadio San Siro; Attendance: 42,846; Referee: Bernardis

24 April 1966 30	Juventus	3–0	Milan	Turin
	Leoncini 35'; Stacchini 66'; Chinesinho 67'			Stadium: Stadio Comunale; Attendance: 22,061; Referee: Di Tonno

1 May 1966 31	Milan	0–0	Torino	Milan
				Stadium: Stadio San Siro; Attendance: 26,458; Referee: Francescon

8 May 1966 32	Atalanta	0–0	Milan	Bergamo
				Stadium: Stadio Comunale; Attendance: 17,104; Referee: De Marchi

15 May 1966 33	Lanerossi Vicenza	1–0	Milan	Vicenza
	Vinicio 66'			Stadium: Stadio Romeo Menti; Attendance: 19,575; Referee: Palazzo

22 May 1966 34	Milan	6–1	Catania	Milan
	Sormani 3', 22', 53', 67' (pen.); Trapattoni 7'; Maddè 90'		56' (o.g.) Maldini	Stadium: Stadio San Siro; Attendance: 16,111; Referee: Bigi

=== Coppa Italia ===
==== Quarterfinals ====
6 January 1966	Milan	1–3	Fiorentina	Milan
	Sormani 78'		7' Brugnera; 52' Hamrin; 70' Pirovano	Stadium: Stadio San Siro; Attendance: 13,743; Referee: Gonella

=== Inter-Cities Fairs Cup ===
==== First round ====
22 September 1965 1	Milan	1–0	Strasbourg	Milan
	Fortunato 41'			Stadium: Stadio San Siro; Attendance: 17,399; Referee: Wharton

27 October 1965 2	Strasbourg	2–1	Milan	Strasbourg
	Hauss 70' (pen.); Farias 89'		59' Benigni	Stadium: Stade de la Meinau; Attendance: 13,000; Referee: Oliveira

7 November 1965 Playoff	Milan	1–1 (a.e.t.)	Strasbourg	Milan
	Angelillo 59'		80' Szczepaniak	Stadium: Stadio San Siro; Attendance: 12,440; Referee: Huber

==== Round of 32 ====
1º December 1965 1	CUF Barreiro	2–0	Milan	Barreiro
	Fernando 61'; Abalroado 89' (pen.)			Stadium: Estádio Alfredo da Silva; Attendance: 15,000; Referee: Huber

8 December 1965 2	Milan	2–0	CUF Barreiro	Milan
	Sormani 18' (pen.); Angelillo 87'			Stadium: Stadio San Siro; Attendance: 9,249; Referee: Mootz

29 December 1965 Playoff	Milan	1–0	CUF Barreiro	Milan
	Lodetti 76'			Stadium: Stadio San Siro; Attendance: 6,382; Referee: Schulenburg

==== Round of 16 ====
9 February 1966 1	Milan	2–1	Chelsea	Milan
	Amarildo 58'; Rivera 75'		89' Graham	Stadium: Stadio San Siro; Attendance: 11,401; Referee: Kreitlein

16 February 1966 2	Chelsea	2–1	Milan	London
	Graham 9'; Osgood 18'		43' Sormani	Stadium: Stamford Bridge; Attendance: 59,541; Referee: Bostroem

2 March 1966 Playoff	Milan	1–1 (a.e.t.)	Chelsea	Milan
	Fortunato 90'		10' Bridges	Stadium: Stadio San Siro; Attendance: 27,036; Referee: Baumgartner

== Statistics ==
=== Squad statistics ===
Competition	Points	Home						Away						Total						GD
Competition	Points	G	W	D	L	Gs	Ga	G	W	D	L	Gs	Ga	G	W	D	L	Gs	Ga	GD
1965-66 Serie A	38	17	9	5	3	31	17	17	4	7	6	12	16	34	13	12	9	43	33	+10
1965-66 Coppa Italia	–	1	0	0	1	1	3	0	0	0	0	0	0	1	0	0	1	1	3	-2
1965-66 Inter-Cities Fairs Cup	–	6	4	2	0	8	3	3	0	0	3	2	6	9	4	2	3	10	9	+1
Total	–	24	13	7	4	40	23	20	4	7	9	14	22	44	17	14	13	54	45	+9

=== Players statistics ===
No.	Pos	Nat	Player	Total		Serie A		Coppa Italia		Inter-Cities Fairs Cup	
No.	Pos	Nat	Player	Apps	Goals	Apps	Goals	Apps	Goals	Apps	Goals
	DF	(Italy) ITA	Alberto Grossetti	4	0	0	0	0	0	4	0
	DF	(Italy) ITA	Luigi Maldera	4	0	0	0	1	0	3	0
	DF	(Italy) ITA	Cesare Maldini	40	0	31	0	1	0	8	0
	DF	(Italy) ITA	Gilberto Noletti	18	1	18	1	0	0	0	0
	GK	(Italy) ITA	Luigi Balzarini	15	-18	6	-7	1	-3	8	-8
	FW	(Brazil) BRA	Amarildo	30	3	24	2	0	0	6	1
	GK	(Italy) ITA	Mario Barluzzi	24	-24	24	-24	0	-0	0	-0
	MF	(Italy) ITA	Urano Benigni	6	1	1	0	1	0	4	1
	MF	(Italy) ITA	Fausto Daolio	3	0	2	0	0	0	1	0
	FW	(Italy) ITA	Paolo Ferrario	0	0	0	0	0	0	0	0
	FW	(Italy) ITA	Sergio Maddè	27	2	21	2	0	0	6	0
	FW	(Italy) ITA	Giuliano Fortunato	19	3	14	1	1	0	4	2
	MF	(Italy) ITA	Giovanni Lodetti	32	3	27	2	0	0	5	1
	MF	(Italy) ITA	Ambrogio Pelagalli	37	0	30	0	1	0	6	0
	FW	(Italy) ITA	Bruno Mora	13	3	12	3	0	0	1	0
	MF	(Italy) ITA	Gianni Rivera	36	8	31	7	1	0	4	1
	DF	(Italy) ITA	Mario Trebbi	25	0	17	0	1	0	7	0
	DF	(Italy) ITA	Nello Santin	34	0	26	0	0	0	8	0
	MF	(Italy) ITA	Nevio Scala	1	0	0	0	0	0	1	0
	DF	(Germany) GER	Karl-Heinz Schnellinger	30	0	25	0	0	0	5	0
	FW	(Italy) ITA	Angelo Benedicto Sormani	39	24	32	21	1	1	6	2
	FW	(Argentina) ARG	Antonio Angelillo	21	3	11	1	1	0	9	2
	MF	(Italy) ITA	Giovanni Trapattoni	21	1	18	1	1	0	2	0
	GK	(Italy) ITA	Claudio Mantovani	5	-3	4	-2	0	-0	1	-1

== See also ==
- AC Milan

== Bibliography ==
- Almanacco illustrato del Milan, ed: 2, March 2005. Panini.
- Enrico Tosi. La storia del Milan, May 2005. Italia/Italy cid Tosi.
- Milan. Sempre con te, December 2009. Mondadori. 2009. ISBN 978-88-04-59118-4.
