= 1964–65 AC Milan season =

Milan Associazione Calcio
1964–65 season
- President: Felice Riva
- Manager: Nils Liedholm
- Stadium: San Siro
- Serie A: 2nd
- Coppa Italia: First round
- Inter-Cities Fairs Cup: First round
- Top goalscorer: League: Amarildo (14); All: Amarildo (14)
- Average home league attendance: 37,733
Home colours	Away colours

During the 1964–65 season Milan Associazione Calcio competed in Serie A, Coppa Italia and Inter-Cities Fairs Cup.

== Summary ==
In the 1964-1965 season Milan was led by Nils Liedholm. With the Swede on the bench and without Dino Sani, who returned to Brazil, the Rossoneri dominated the first half of the season, being unbeaten for the first nineteen matches, and maintained the top of the league until the 31st matchday, when the comeback of city-rivals Inter was completed after a home loss against Roma. They finished second in the standings, three points behind the Nerazzurri, after having reached a maximum lead of seven points in January.

Milan participated in the Inter-Cities Fairs Cup, where they were eliminated in the first round by Strasbourg. The journey in the Coppa Italia was also short, being eliminated in the first round by Monza. At the end of the season Gipo Viani moved to Genoa after nine seasons with the Rossoneri, two as head coach and seven as technical director.

== Squad ==
Note: Flags indicate national team as defined under FIFA eligibility rules; some limited exceptions apply. Players may hold more than one non-FIFA nationality.

Pos.	Nation	Player
GK	ITA	Luigi Balzarini
GK	ITA	Mario Barluzzi
GK	ITA	Claudio Mantovani
GK	ITA	Giorgio Ghezzi
DF	ITA	Gilberto Noletti
DF	ITA	Cesare Maldini (Captain)
DF	ITA	Luigi Radice (vice-captain)
DF	ITA	Mario Trebbi
DF	ITA	Nello Santin
DF	ITA	Giovanni Trapattoni
MF	ITA	Giancarlo Salvi
MF	ITA	Bruno Bacchetta
MF	PER	Víctor Benítez

Pos.	Nation	Player
MF	ITA	Ambrogio Pelagalli
MF	ITA	Giovanni Lodetti
MF	ITA	Mario David
MF	ITA	Gianni Rivera
MF	ITA	Eugenio Petrini
FW	BRA	Amarildo
FW	BRA	José Altafini
FW	ITA	Giuliano Fortunato
FW	ITA	Bruno Mora
FW	ITA	Paolo Ferrario
FW	ITA	Aquilino Bonfanti
FW	BRA	Germano

=== Transfers ===
In
Pos.	Name	from	Type
FW	Aquilino Bonfanti	Rizzoli Milano	-
FW	José Germano de Sales	Genoa	-
GK	Claudio Mantovani	Saronno	-
MF	Eugenio Petrini	Rizzoli Milano	-
MF	Giancarlo Salvi	Sampdoria	-

Out
Pos.	Name	To	Type
FW	Branko Kubala	Espanyol	-
DF	Luciano Poppi	Alessandria	-
MF	Dino Sani	Corinthians	-

== Competitions ==
=== Serie A ===
==== League table ====
Pos	Team	Pld	W	D	L	GF	GA	GD	Pts	Qualification or relegation
1	Internazionale (C)	34	22	10	2	68	29	+39	54	Qualification to European Cup
2	Milan	34	21	9	4	52	23	+29	51	Chosen for Inter-Cities Fairs Cup
3	Torino	34	16	12	6	48	27	+21	44	Chosen for Inter-Cities Fairs Cup
4	Fiorentina	34	16	9	9	52	37	+15	41	Chosen for Inter-Cities Fairs Cup
4	Juventus	34	15	11	8	43	24	+19	41	Qualification to Cup Winners' Cup

Source: Panini
(C) Champions

==== Matches ====
13 September 1964 1	Milan	1–1	Catania	Milan
	Lodetti 1'		90' Facchin	Stadium: Stadio San Siro; Attendance: 26,204; Referee: Varazzani

20 September 1964 2	Mantova	0–4	Milan	Mantova
			25' Mora; 52' (o.g.) Jonsson; 54', 78' Ferrario	Stadium: Stadio Danilo Martelli; Attendance: 14,724; Referee: Francescon

27 September 1964 3	Lanerossi Vicenza	2–3	Milan	Vicenza
	Dell'Angelo 69'; Vinicio 76'		51', 55' Amarildo; 64' Mora	Stadium: Stadio Romeo Menti; Attendance: 14,780; Referee: Sbardella

4 October 1964 4	Milan	1–1	Torino	Milan
	Fortunato 79'		74' Simoni	Stadium: Stadio San Siro; Attendance: 36,964; Referee: De Marchi

11 October 1964 5	Milan	2–1	Lazio	Milan
	Lodetti 41'; Fortunato 74'		88' Gasperi	Stadium: Stadio San Siro; Attendance: 34,493; Referee: Bernardis

18 October 1964 6	Messina	0–2	Milan	Messina
			71', 74' Amarildo	Stadium: Stadio Giovanni Celeste; Attendance: 18,160; Referee: D'Agostini

25 October 1964 7	Milan	2–0	Atalanta	Milan
	Ferrario 41'; Amarildo 81'			Stadium: Stadio San Siro; Attendance: 25,064; Referee: Lo Bello

8 November 1964 8	Sampdoria	0–2	Milan	Genoa
			28' Mora; 57' Ferrario	Stadium: Stadio Luigi Ferraris; Attendance: 23,455; Referee: Sbardella

15 November 1964 9	Milan	3–0	Inter Milan	Milan
	Suarez 53' (o.g.); Lodetti 67'; Amarildo 88'			Stadium: Stadio San Siro; Attendance: 67,766; Referee: Lo Bello

22 November 1964 10	Milan	2–0	Fiorentina	Milan
	Mora 48'; Fortunato 51'			Stadium: Stadio San Siro; Attendance: 39,660; Referee: Francescon

29 November 1964 11	Foggia	1–2	Milan	Foggia
	Valadè 30'		18', 75' Ferrario	Stadium: Stadio Pino Zaccheria; Attendance: 24,734; Referee: D'Agostini

13 December 1964 12	Juventus	2–2	Milan	Turin
	Combin 48'; Menichelli 90'		59' Amarildo; 77' Ferrario	Stadium: Stadio Comunale; Attendance: 60,796; Referee: Sbardella

20 December 1964 13	Milan	3–1	Bologna	Milan
	Rivera 7'; Amarildo 56'; Lodetti 90'		69' (pen.) Haller	Stadium: Stadio San Siro; Attendance: 46,684; Referee: Francescon

27 December 1964 14	Roma	1–2	Milan	Rome
	Francesconi 52'		43' Noletti; 88' Ferrario	Stadium: Stadio Olimpico; Attendance: 29,508; Referee: De Marchi

3 January 1965 15	Varese	0–0	Milan	Varese
				Stadium: Stadio Franco Ossola; Attendance: 21,268; Referee: Politano

10 January 1965 16	Milan	1–0	Genoa	Milan
	Rivara 10' (o.g.)			Stadium: Stadio San Siro; Attendance: 34,580; Referee: Varazzani

17 January 1965 17	Milan	1–0	Cagliari	Milan
	Fortunato 48'			Stadium: Stadio San Siro; Attendance: 25,775; Referee: Righetti

24 January 1965 18	Catania	1–1	Milan	Catania
	Danova 36'		5' Ferrario	Stadium: Stadio Cibali; Attendance: 19,650; Referee: D'Agostini

31 January 1965 19	Milan	2–0	Mantova	Milan
	Ferrario 4'; Amarildo 82'			Stadium: Stadio San Siro; Attendance: 19,504; Referee: Angonese

7 February 1965 20	Milan	0–1	Lanerossi Vicenza	Milan
			42' Colausig	Stadium: Stadio San Siro; Attendance: 49,573; Referee: Bernardis

14 February 1965 21	Torino	1–2	Milan	Turin
	Puia 12'		45' Amarildo; 85' Altafini	Stadium: Stadio Comunale; Attendance: 53,942; Referee: Lo Bello

21 February 1965 22	Lazio	0–0	Milan	Rome
				Stadium: Stadio Olimpico; Attendance: 31,758; Referee: De Marchi

28 February 1965 23	Milan	2–0	Messina	Milan
	Amarildo 25'; Rivera 78'			Stadium: Stadio San Siro; Attendance: 29,884; Referee: De Robbio

7 March 1965 24	Atalanta	1–1	Milan	Bergamo
	Petroni 44'		65' Altafini	Stadium: Stadio Comunale; Attendance: 29,763; Referee: Francescon

21 March 1965 25	Milan	3–0	Sampdoria	Milan
	Vincenzi 4' (o.g.); Mora 32'; Altafini 37'			Stadium: Stadio San Siro; Attendance: 32,107; Referee: Righetti

28 March 1965 26	Inter Milan	5–2	Milan	Milan
	Jair 5'; Domenghini 68'; Corso 72'; Mazzola 80', 84'		17', 75' Amarildo	Stadium: Stadio San Siro; Attendance: 75,891; Referee: Sbardella

4 April 1965 27	Fiorentina	0–0	Milan	Florence
				Stadium: Stadio Comunale; Attendance: 47,441; Referee: De Marchi

11 April 1965 28	Milan	1–0	Foggia	Milan
	Benitez 86'			Stadium: Stadio San Siro; Attendance: 40,586; Referee: Bernardis

25 April 1965 29	Milan	1–0	Juventus	Milan
	Amarildo 86'			Stadium: Stadio San Siro; Attendance: 62,507; Referee: D'Agostini

9 May 1965 30	Bologna	0–2	Milan	Bologna
			32', 80' Ferrario	Stadium: Stadio Comunale; Attendance: 37,383; Referee: Lo Bello

16 May 1965 31	Milan	0–2	Roma	Milan
			40' (pen.) Manfredini; 76' Francesconi	Stadium: Stadio San Siro; Attendance: 33,653; Referee: Varazzani

23 May 1965 32	Milan	1–0	Varese	Milan
	Ferrario 46'			Stadium: Stadio San Siro; Attendance: 38,415; Referee: Bernardis

30 May 1965 33	Genoa	0–0	Milan	Genoa
				Stadium: Stadio Luigi Ferraris; Attendance: 30,913; Referee: De Marchi

6 June 1965 34	Cagliari	2–1	Milan	Cagliari
	Riva 30'; Visentin 52'		40' (pen.) Mora	Stadium: Stadio Amsicora; Attendance: 24,964; Referee: Francescon

=== Coppa Italia ===
==== First round ====
6 September 1964 1	Monza	2–1	Milan	Monza
	Melonari 56', 99' (pen.)		12' David	Stadium: Stadio location di Monza; Attendance: 5,200; Referee: Orlando

=== Inter-Cities Fairs Cup ===
==== First round ====
9 September 1964 1	Strasbourg	2–0	Milan	Strasbourg
	Merschel 75'; Hausser 87'			Stadium: Stade de la Meinau; Attendance: 11,500; Referee: Dienst

30 September 1964 2	Milan	1–0	Strasbourg	Milan
	Ferrario 9'			Stadium: Stadio San Siro; Attendance: 27,554; Referee: Varaždinec

== Statistics ==
=== Squad statistics ===
Competition	Points	Home						Away						Total						GD
Competition	Points	G	W	D	L	Gs	Ga	G	W	D	L	Gs	Ga	G	W	D	L	Gs	Ga	GD
1964-65 Serie A	51	17	13	2	2	26	7	17	8	7	2	26	16	34	21	9	4	52	23	+29
1964-65 Coppa Italia	–	0	0	0	0	0	0	1	0	0	1	1	2	1	0	0	1	1	2	-1
1964-65 Inter-Cities Fairs Cup	–	1	1	0	0	1	0	1	0	0	1	0	2	2	1	0	1	1	2	-1
Total	–	18	14	2	2	27	7	19	8	7	4	27	20	37	22	9	6	54	27	+27

=== Players statistics ===
No.	Pos	Nat	Player	Total		Serie A		Coppa Italia		Inter-Cities Fairs Cup	
No.	Pos	Nat	Player	Apps	Goals	Apps	Goals	Apps	Goals	Apps	Goals
	GK	(Italy) ITA	Giorgio Ghezzi	6	-5	6	-5	0	0	0	0
	MF	(Italy) ITA	Eugenio Petrini	1	0	0	0	1	0	0	0
	DF	(Italy) ITA	Cesare Maldini	36	0	34	0	0	0	2	0
	DF	(Italy) ITA	Gilberto Noletti	30	1	27	1	1	0	2	0
	GK	(Italy) ITA	Luigi Balzarini	0	0	0	0	0	0	0	0
	FW	(Brazil) BRA	Amarildo	30	14	27	14	1	0	2	0
	GK	(Italy) ITA	Mario Barluzzi	31	-22	28	-18	1	-2	2	-2
	MF	(Italy) ITA	Bruno Bacchetta	2	0	0	0	1	0	1	0
	MF	(Peru) PER	Víctor Benítez	27	1	26	1	0	0	1	0
	FW	(Italy) ITA	Paolo Ferrario	21	13	20	12	0	0	1	1
	FW	(Brazil) BRA	José Altafini	12	3	12	3	0	0	0	0
	FW	(Italy) ITA	Giuliano Fortunato	19	5	17	5	1	0	1	0
	MF	(Italy) ITA	Giovanni Lodetti	36	4	34	4	1	0	1	0
	MF	(Italy) ITA	Ambrogio Pelagalli	34	0	32	0	0	0	2	0
	FW	(Italy) ITA	Bruno Mora	31	6	30	6	0	0	1	0
	MF	(Italy) ITA	Gianni Rivera	29	2	29	2	0	0	0	0
	DF	(Italy) ITA	Mario Trebbi	10	0	8	0	1	0	1	0
	DF	(Italy) ITA	Nello Santin	4	0	4	0	0	0	0	0
	MF	(Italy) ITA	Mario David	6	1	3	0	1	1	2	0
	MF	(Italy) ITA	Giancarlo Salvi	4	0	2	0	1	0	1	0
	DF	(Italy) ITA	Luigi Radice	3	0	2	0	1	0	0	0
	FW	(Italy) ITA	Aquilino Bonfanti	3	0	3	0	0	0	0	0
	FW	(Brazil) BRA	Germano	1	0	0	0	0	0	1	0
	MF	(Italy) ITA	Giovanni Trapattoni	32	0	30	0	1	0	1	0
	GK	(Italy) ITA	Claudio Mantovani	0	0	0	0	0	0	0	0

== See also ==
- AC Milan

== Bibliography ==
- Almanacco illustrato del Milan, ed: 2, March 2005. Panini.
- Enrico Tosi. La storia del Milan, May 2005. Italia/Italy cid Tosi.
- Milan. Sempre con te, December 2009. Mondadori. 2009. ISBN 978-88-04-59118-4.
