= Gianni Rivera =

Italian footballer and politician (born 1943)

Giovanni Rivera
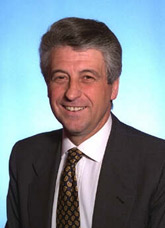
- Official portrait, 1996

Member of European Parliament
- In office 25 May 2005 – 13 July 2009
- Constituency: North-West Italy

Member of the Chamber of Deputies
- In office 2 July 1987 – 29 May 2001
- Constituency: Milan

Personal details
- Born: 18 August 1943 (age 83) Alessandria, Italy
- Party: CD (2013); DL (2002–2007); Dem (1999–2002); Segni Pact (1994–1996); DC (1987–1994)
- Height: 1.75 m (5 ft 9 in)
- Occupation: Footballer (retired); Politician
Association football career
- Positions: Forward; attacking midfielder
Senior career*
Years	Team	Apps	(Gls)
1958–1960	Alessandria	26	(6)
1960–1979	AC Milan	501	(122)
Total		527	(128)
International career
1962–1974	Italy	60	(14)
Medal record
Men's Football
Representing Italy
UEFA European Championship
Winner	1968 Italy
FIFA World Cup
Runner-up	1970 Mexico
- * Club domestic league appearances and goals

Giovanni "Gianni" Rivera (Italian pronunciation: [ˈdʒanni riˈvɛːra]; born 18 August 1943) is an Italian politician and former footballer who played as an attacking midfielder for clubs Alessandria and AC Milan.

Dubbed Italy's "Golden Boy" by the media, he played the majority of his club career with Italian side AC Milan, after beginning his career with hometown club Alessandria in 1959. After joining Milan in 1960, he enjoyed a highly successful career in domestic and European football, winning two European Cups, three Serie A titles and four Coppa Italia titles, among several other trophies, and also serving as the team's captain for twelve seasons.

At international level, Rivera represented Italy national team 60 times between 1962 and 1974, scoring 14 goals, and took part at four World Cups (1962, 1966, 1970, and 1974). Rivera is widely remembered for scoring the decisive goal in Italy's 4–3 extra-time win over West Germany in the semi-final of the 1970 World Cup, leading the team to final, only to suffer a 4–1 defeat against Brazil, however. Rivera was also a member of the first Italian side ever to win the European Football Championship in 1968, on home soil, and represented Italy at the 1960 Summer Olympics in Rome, helping the team to a fourth-place finish.

Rivera was an elegant, efficient, and creative offensive playmaker, with an eye for goal, who possessed excellent vision and technical ability. Regarded as one of the greatest Italian footballers of all time, and by some as Italy's greatest player ever, he was awarded the Ballon d'Or in 1969, and placed 19th in IFFHS's election for the World Player of the 20th Century. In 2015, he became the first Italian footballer out of 100 athletes to be inducted into Italy's sports Walk of Fame. In 2004, Pelé chose Rivera as part of the FIFA 100 greatest living footballers, and he placed 35th in the UEFA Golden Jubilee Poll.

After retiring from football in 1979, Rivera became Milan's vice-president and later went into politics in 1987. In 2013, he was appointed as President of the educational youth sector for the Italy national team by the FIGC, along with Roberto Baggio and Arrigo Sacchi, under head coach Cesare Prandelli. The Athletic The Soccer 100 listed him at 68th greatest player ever. Following the death of Denis Law in January 2025, Rivera is currently the oldest living recipient of the Ballon D'Or.

== Early life ==
Rivera was born in Alessandria, Piedmont, to Edera and Teresio; his father was a railway worker. Gianni began playing football with local side ASD Don Bosco, where he was scouted by former Milan midfielder Franco Pedroni, who was the assistant coach at Alessandria at the time, prompting Rivera to join the local Serie A side at the age of 13.

== Club career ==
=== 1959–1962: Debut with Alessandria, early years with AC Milan and first scudetto ===
"He's an elegant young player with a remarkable touch."

— Giuseppe Meazza comments on Rivera after watching him play with Milan for the first time.

Nicknamed l'Abatino, and the Golden Boy of Italian football throughout his career, Rivera was the product of his hometown club's youth football academy; he joined the first team in 1958 and made his debut in Serie A for the Alessandria senior side against Internazionale on 2 June 1959 at the age of only fifteen years, nine months and fifteen days, in a 1–1 draw; later that year, he scored his first Serie A goal in a 2–2 home draw with Sampdoria on 25 October. He is the third youngest player in history to debut in Serie A, behind only Amedeo Amadei and Pietro Pellegri, and the second youngest goalscorer in Serie A, behind only Amadei. A year later, he was bought by AC Milan on a co-ownership deal, as an eventual replacement for the club's captain Juan Schiaffino in the playmaking role; although the club's officials were concerned about Rivera's diminutive physique during his trial, Schiaffino insisted that the talented youngster be offered a contract, and later served as a mentor to the young attacking midfielder. Rivera spent his first season at the club back on a year-long loan with Alessandria; during the season, he scored a goal in a 1–1 draw with Milan on 7 February 1960, and played 26 matches in total, in which he scored 6 goals, also earning the nickname Il Signorino (the little gentleman). Despite Alessandria's relegation, Rivera's performances throughout the season impressed Milan, who later that year signed the youngster outright from Alessandria for another 65 million Lire, making his total transfer fee at the time a notable sum of 130 million Lire; the transfer fee paid by Milan to Alessandria also included the sale of Giancarlo Migliavacca, and Sergio Bettini on loan. Rivera's final appearance with Alessandria came on 19 June 1960, in a 2–0 home defeat against FC La Chaux-de-Fonds in the first-ever edition of the Coppa delle Alpi.

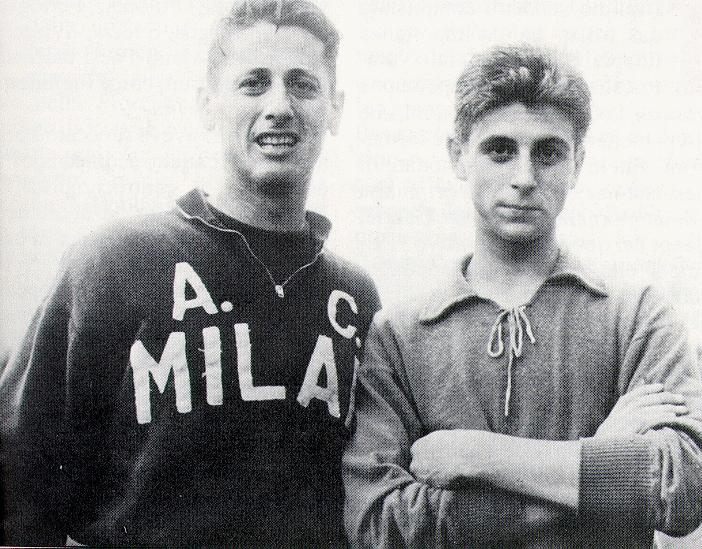
Juan Schiaffino and Rivera in 1960.

Rivera made his Milan debut on 18 September 1960, in a 3–5 away win over his former club Alessandria in the Coppa Italia, under manager Giuseppe Viani, who later gave Rivera his famed nickname the Golden Boy. Rivera's Milan league debut came in a 3–0 home win against Catania on 25 September, and he later also appeared in a 5–1 win over Bologna on 9 October 1960; he scored his first goal with Milan on 6 November, the match-winning goal in a 4–3 away win over Juventus, at the age of seventeen. During his first season with Milan, he played alongside several legendary Milan players, such as Cesare Maldini, Giovanni Trapattoni, Dino Sani, Fabio Cudicini, and José Altafini, among others, immediately breaking into the starting line-up, and being handed the number 10 shirt, as Milan finished the league season in second place. After initially struggling to gain playing time under new manager Nereo Rocco during the 1961–62 season, his second at the club, also being linked with loans to Vicenza and Juventus, Rivera won his way back into the starting line-up and played a decisive role as he won his first scudetto with Milan, scoring 10 goals in the league; in the title deciding match on 8 April 1962 against Torino, Rivera scored in a 4–2 win, as Milan won the title with two matches to spare. Throughout his career, Rivera formed an important relationship with the legendary manager and catenaccio mastermind; he played a key role in the club's successes under Rocco, who subsequently built a hard-working, winning team around Rivera that complemented the midfielder's creative playing style. Due to his performances throughout the season, on 13 May 1962, aged just eighteen, Rivera played his first competitive match for the Italy national team at that year's World Cup in Chile. A precocious talent, despite his young age, Rivera soon became known for his ability to orchestrate Milan's attacking moves, as well as his leadership within the team, and he served as the club's captain for 12 of his 19 seasons with Milan after being handed the armband in 1966, at the age of 23.

=== 1962–1970: International successes with AC Milan ===
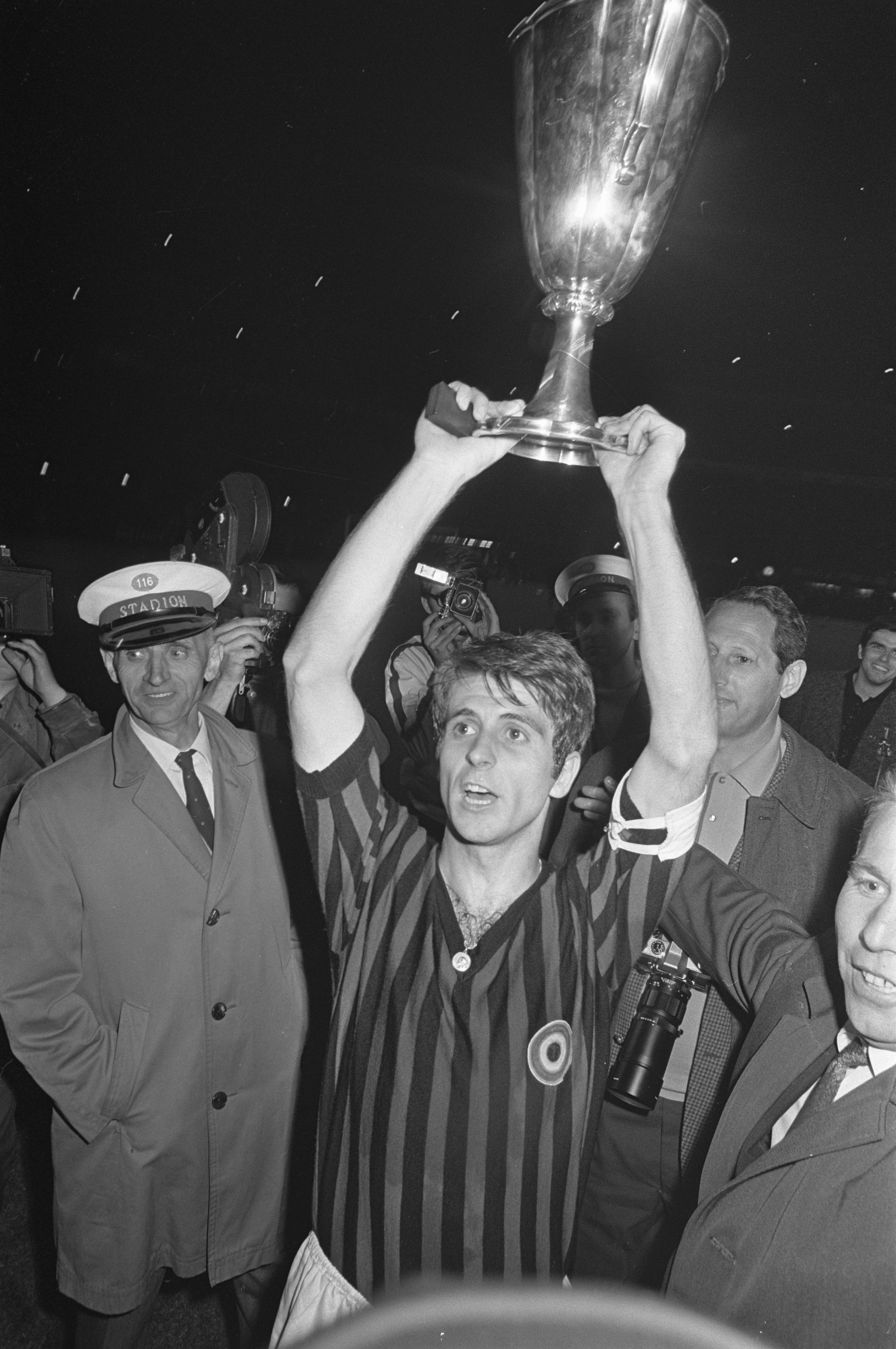
Rivera lifting the Cup Winners' Cup in 1968.

Rivera's 1962 scudetto victory with Milan under Nereo Rocco enabled the team to qualify for the European Cup in 1962, and earned him a sixth-place finish in that year's Ballon d'Or. Despite missing out on the Serie A title the following season, Rivera played a key role in helping Milan finally win their first ever European Cup title in 1963, at the age of twenty, defeating Benfica 2–1 in the final. Rivera was in great form during the match, providing two notable assists for José Altafini's goals; he finished the season in double figures once again with 11 goals for Milan in all competitions, while he made 40 appearances throughout the season for both club and country. Milan suffered a defeat in the Intercontinental Cup, however, in a playoff match against Santos following a 6–6 draw on aggregate. For his performances, Rivera was awarded second place in the prestigious Ballon d'Or award that year, which was won by the Russian goalkeeper Lev Yashin. With the departure of Nereo Rocco to Torino, Milan struggled to replicate the same level of success during the next few seasons, missing out on the league title to cross-city rivals Inter in 1965; despite the club's loss of form during this period, Rivera's performances continued to be decisive, as he managed ninth, seventh, and sixteenth placements respectively in the Ballon d'Or in 1964, 1965, and 1967, while he helped Milan win the Coppa Italia during the 1966–67 season, finishing the competition as top-scorer, with 7 goals.

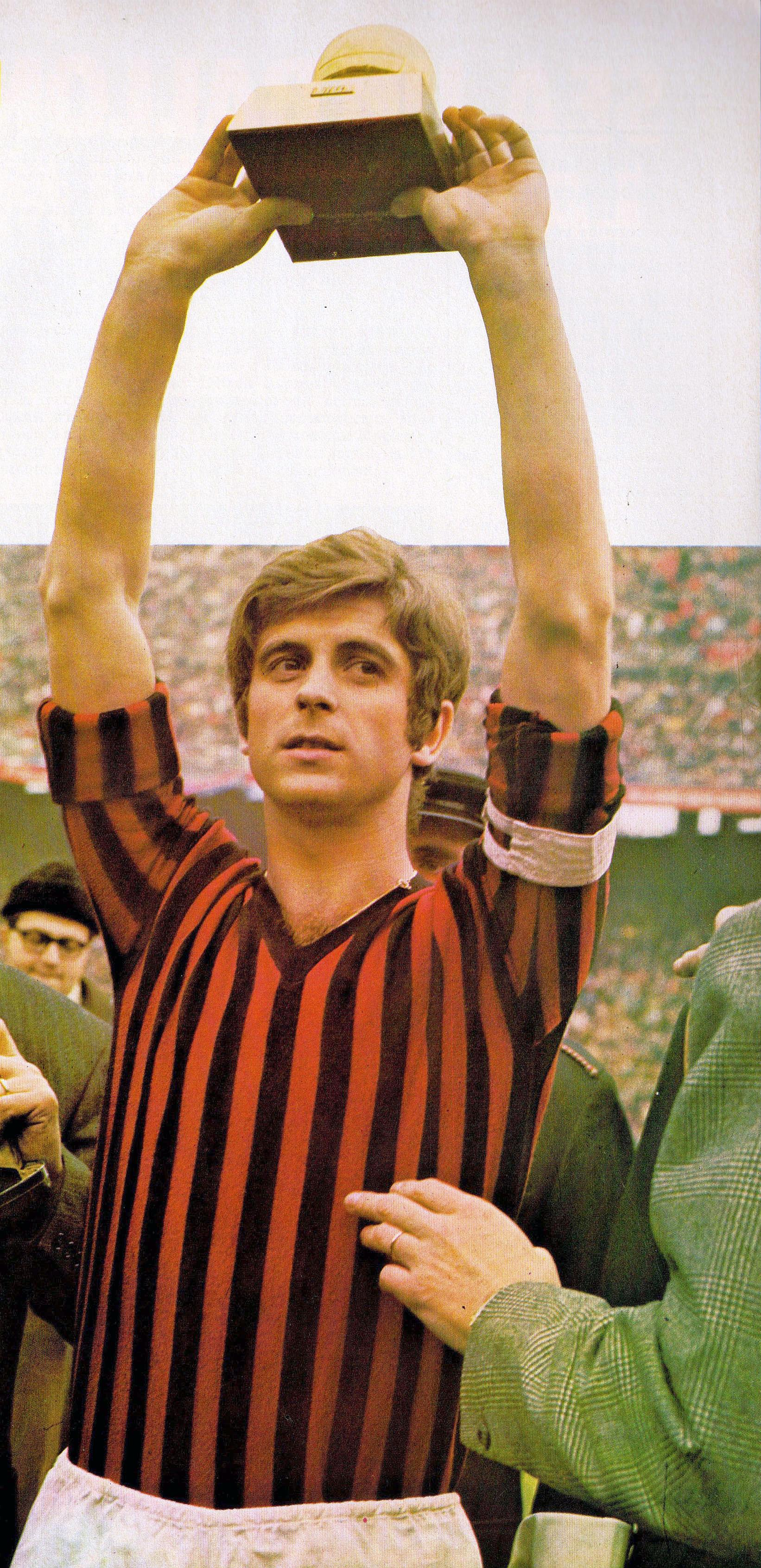
Rivera lifting the Ballon d'Or in 1969.

In the 1967–68 season, Nereo Rocco returned to the club and rebuilt the team's offence around Rivera; as a result, Milan managed a double, as the team won both the Scudetto, and the Cup Winners' Cup final, with a 2–0 win over Hamburger SV in the latter tournament. Rivera scored 11 goals in Serie A as Milan won the league title with a nine-point advantage over runners-up Napoli; he also played for Italy that summer as they won the 1968 European Championship on home soil, earning praise from journalist Gianni Brera, who described him as the greatest Italian player post-World War II. Despite his performances and success throughout the season, Rivera missed out on the Ballon d'Or however, which was awarded to European Cup winner George Best, with Rivera finishing in ninth place in the final rankings. The next season saw Rivera and Milan emerge victorious in the European Cup, winning the final over Johan Cruyff's Ajax, a match which is regarded as one of Rivera's greatest, most dominant, and most virtuosic performances: playing in the number 10 role, Rivera captained Milan to a 4–1 victory at the Santiago Bernabeu stadium in Madrid, setting up two of Prati's three goals in the final. In addition to the European Cup that season, Rivera also won the Intercontinental Cup in a physical encounter against Estudiantes, scoring a goal in a 2–1 defeat in the second leg, after Milan had won the first leg 3–0; these successes finally earned him the Ballon d'Or in 1969, making him the first Italian-born player, and the second Italian player after Omar Sívori, to win the award.

=== 1970–1979: Later years with AC Milan ===
In the 70s, Rivera's continued strong performances led Milan on to two more Cup Winners' Cup finals, one in 1973 and another in 1974; Rivera managed to win the 1973 final with Milan in a hard-fought 1–0 victory against Leeds, but the following year, Milan suffered a 2–0 defeat against Magdeburg in the final of the tournament. Rivera also suffered a 6–1 defeat on aggregate against Ajax in the 1973 European Supercup final with Milan. During the early 70s, Rivera also won two consecutive Coppa Italia titles with the Rossoneri, in 1972, and 1973; one of his most prominent performances in the Coppa Italia during the 70s was in the 1970–71 edition of the tournament, in which Milan finished in second place, largely due to Rivera's 7 goals in the competition, which earned him the title of top-scorer. His decisive individual performances saw him place eighteenth in the 1972 Ballon d'Or, and eighth in the 1973 Ballon d'Or. Despite these titles, Milan struggled to achieve similar success in Serie A during this period; in the 1970–71, 1971–72 and the 1972–73 seasons, Milan managed three consecutive second places in Serie A, also reaching the semi-finals of the UEFA Cup during the 1971–72 season. Rivera missed most of the club's league matches during the 1971–72 season, as he was banned for a record nine matches after protesting a penalty awarded by the referee Michelotti in a match against Cagliari. Rivera picked up a three-month suspension because of his statements against Italian referees, suggesting that they favoured Milan's rivals Inter and Juventus; coincidentally, the latter team won the Serie A title that season. Rivera finished the 1972–73 season as top-scorer in Serie A alongside Paolo Pulici and Giuseppe Savoldi, with 17 goals in 28 league matches, and scored a personal best of 20 goals in all club competitions, as, despite winning both the Coppa Italia and the Cup Winners' Cup, Milan once again finished in second place in the league, narrowly missing out on the Serie A title to Juventus, after losing out against Verona on the final matchday of the season.

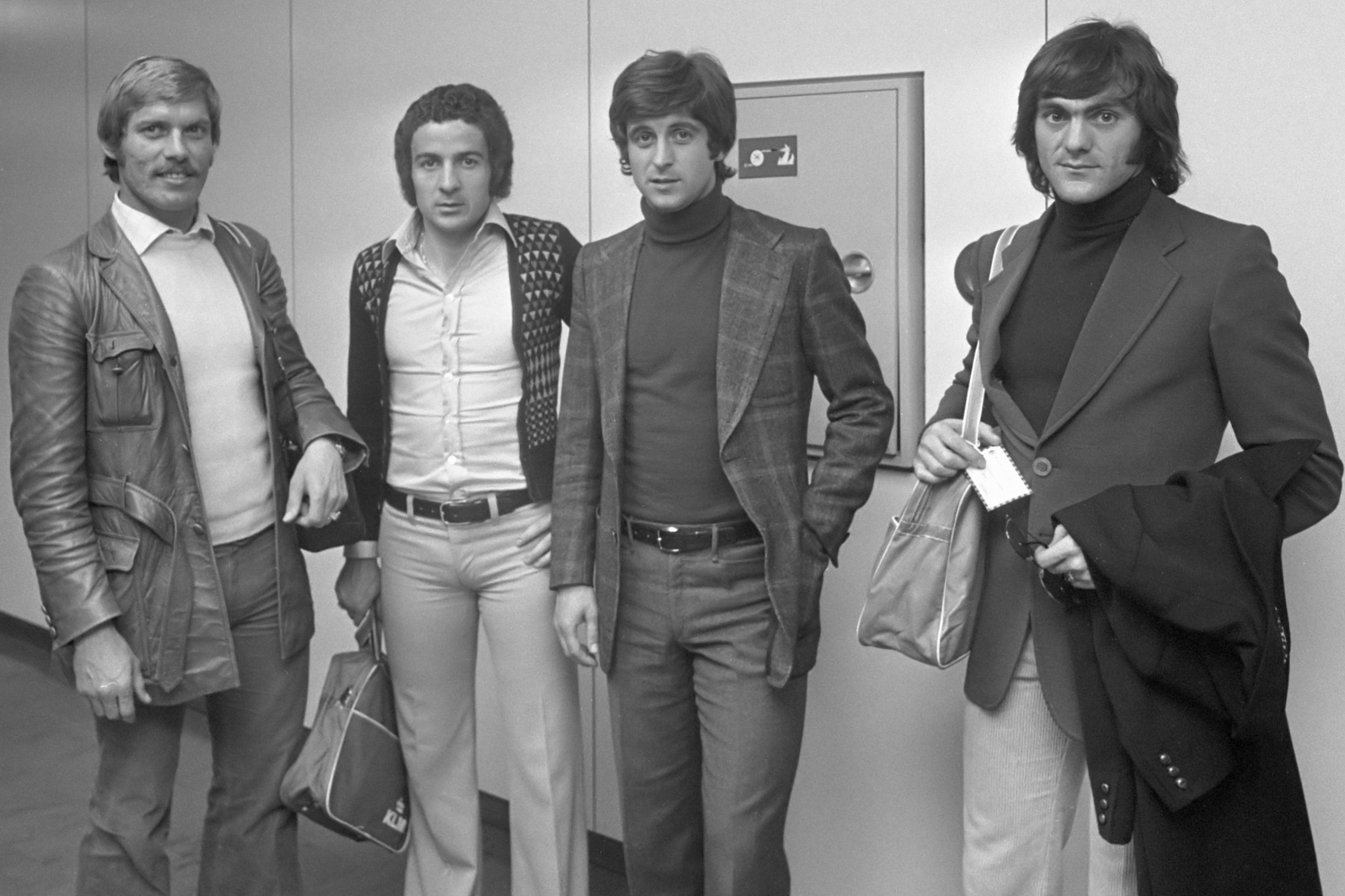
Romeo Benetti, Luciano Chiarugi, Rivera and Giuseppe Sabadini at Schiphol in May 1974.

Following Rocco's second departure from the club in 1973, the club's management attempted to persuade Rivera to leave Milan, although Rivera ultimately chose to remain with the club. During this period, Milan also reached the Coppa Italia final during the 1974–75 season, and won another Coppa Italia title in the 1976–77 season. Rivera won the last scudetto of his playing career in his final season with the club, under manager Nils Liedholm, at the age of 35; despite his own advancing age and physical decline, he still contributed to Milan's League title in 1979, the club's tenth overall, with 13 appearances and a goal, which earned The Devils a star on their jersey. His final career appearance came in a 1–1 away draw with Lazio in the league, on 13 May; he officially announced his retirement on 10 June. In total, Rivera played for Milan in 501 Serie A matches and scored 122 league goals, with a total of 164 goals in 658 appearances in all competitions for Milan. With 128 goals in 527 Serie A appearances across 20 seasons, he is the 11th most capped player in Serie A history and the highest-scoring midfielder in the league's history. With 105 league assists, he is also the fourth-highest assist provider of all time in Serie A history, behind only Francesco Totti, Roberto Baggio, and Alessandro Del Piero. In total, Rivera scored 170 goals in all club competitions in 684 appearances.

== International career ==
=== Early years ===
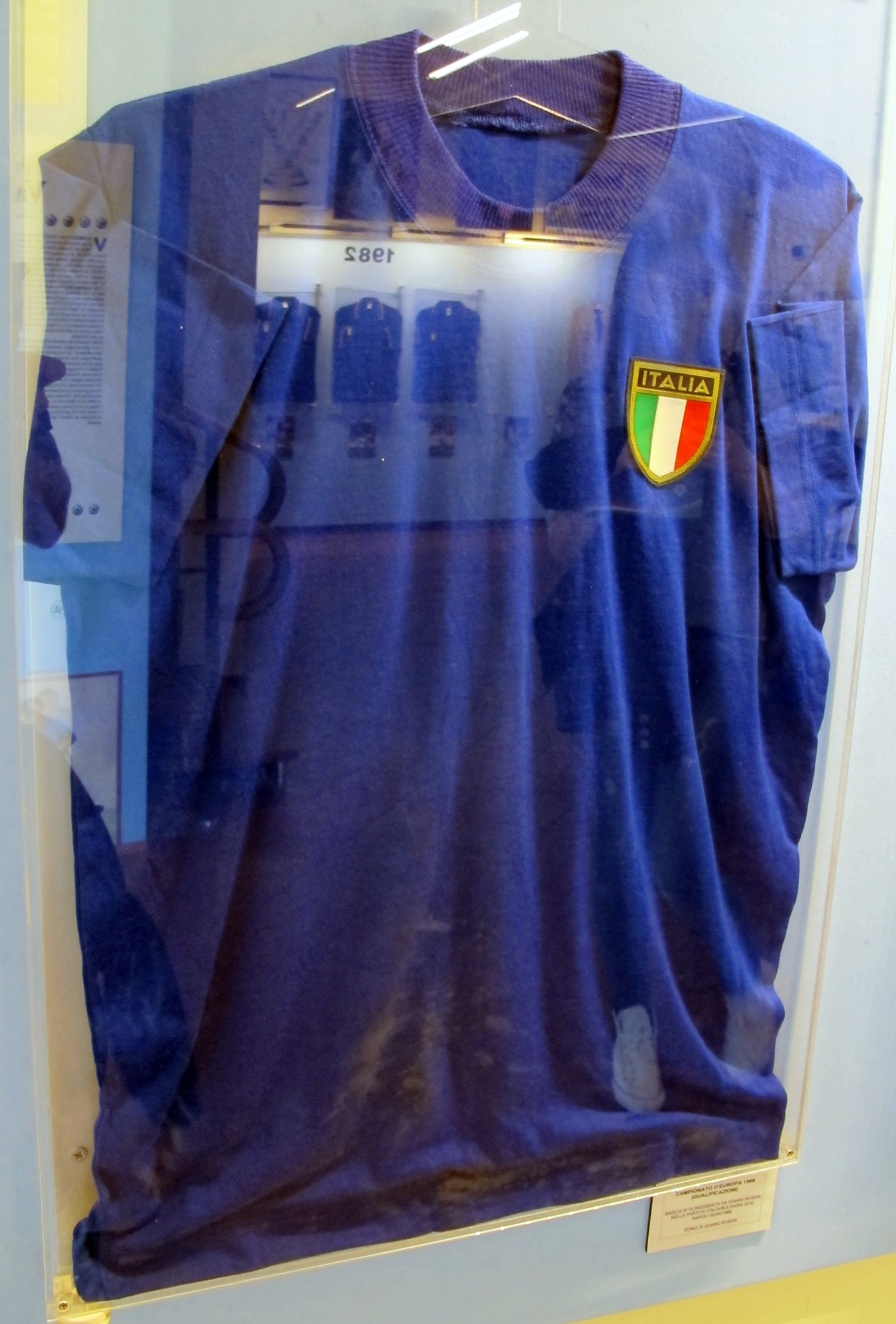
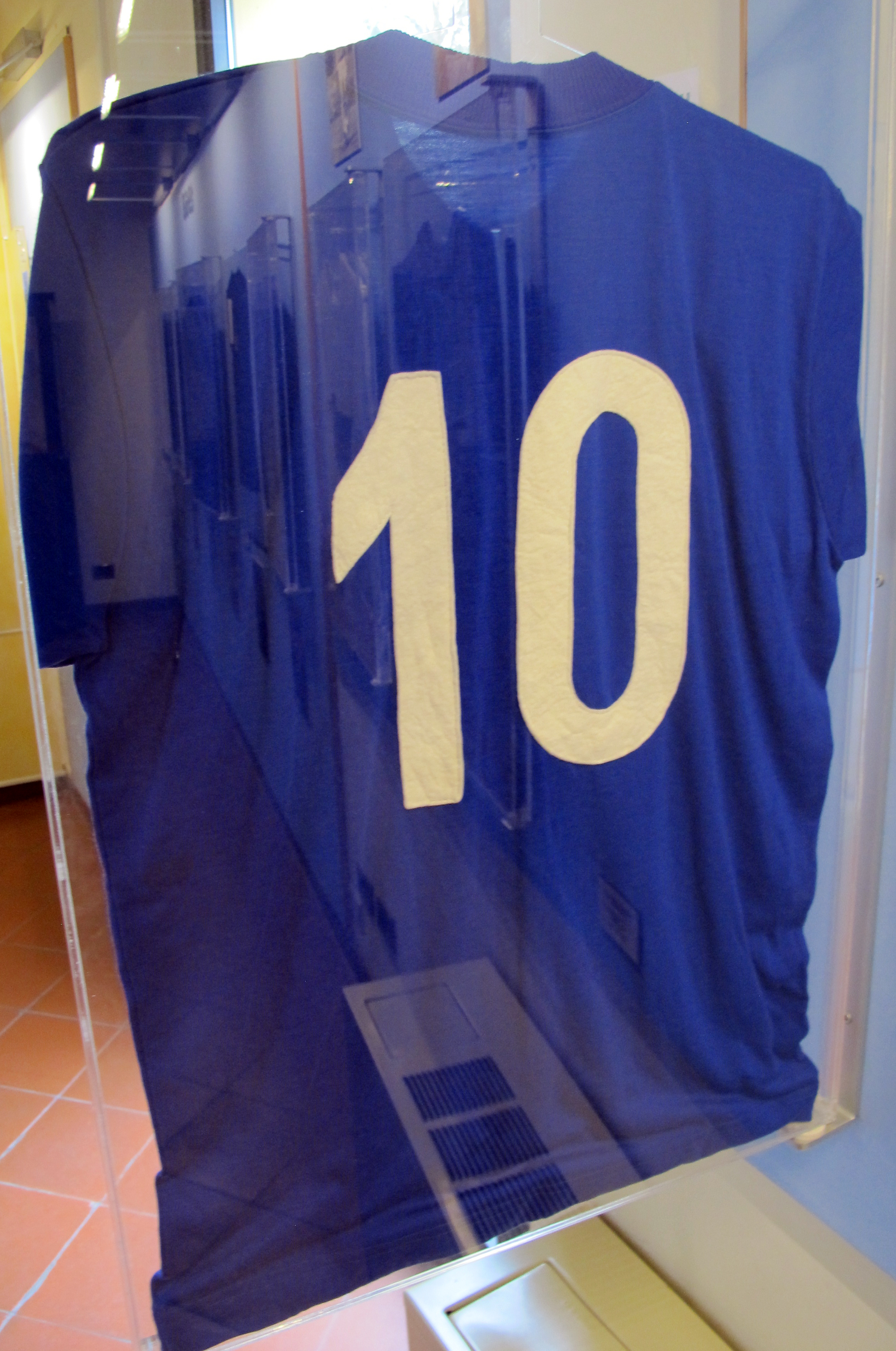
Rivera's number 10 Italy shirt, worn against Bulgaria on 20 April 1968.

Rivera was a part of the Italy national side between 1962 and 1974. Rivera made his international debut with the under-21 side on 9 March 1960, scoring 2 goals in a 4–1 pre-Olympic friendly win over Switzerland, alongside Giacomo Bulgarelli. At the Summer Olympics in Rome, Rivera made his tournament debut in a 4–1 win against Taiwan, at the age of seventeen, and teamed up with Bulgarelli in midfield to help the Italians to a fourth-place finish under Viani, scoring three goals in five matches.

With the Italian senior side, Rivera made his debut on 13 May 1962 in a 3–1 away win against Belgium, at the age of eighteen. He took part at the 1962 FIFA World Cup in Chile with the national team, and made both his first ever competitive and World Cup appearance for Italy at the tournament, in a 0–0 draw against West Germany on 31 May; this was his only appearance in the competition, however, as Italy disappointed and suffered a controversial first-round elimination. Despite Rivera's creative talent, offensive capabilities, and technical skills, the celebrated Italian sports journalist Gianni Brera was critical of the youngster's performance, due to his lack of pace, physicality, and his poor defensive work-rate, nicknaming him l'Abatino (the little abbot), and also stating that the in-form Angelo Sormani should have played in his place. Later that year, on his fourth international appearance, Rivera also scored his first goal for Italy on 2 December, at the age of 19 years and 206 days, in a 6–0 home win over Turkey, in Italy's opening Euro 1964 qualifying match, making him Italy's second-youngest goalscorer ever at the time, behind only Bruno Nicolè, and the youngest player ever to score a goal for Italy in a competitive match; he later also added a second goal during the match, making him the youngest player ever to score a brace for Italy in a competitive match.

Rivera was later also included in Italy's squad for the 1966 FIFA World Cup in England; during the tournament, Rivera was critical of Edmondo Fabbri's defensive-minded system, and the Italians suffered another first-round elimination following an unexpected defeat to North Korea in their final group match. Despite the early elimination, Brera singled out Rivera as the only Italian player to have put in a strong performance on this occasion. Following two disappointing tournaments with Italy, Rivera was excluded from the Italian squad under manager Helenio Herrera, who mainly fielded players from his Grande Inter side; it was only at the insistence of Brera that Rivera was brought back into the Italian side. Under manager Ferruccio Valcareggi, Rivera was later part of the victorious Italian side that won their first European Championship in 1968, on home soil; however, despite picking up a winner's medal in the tournament, Rivera missed the final against Yugoslavia, after sustaining an injury at the beginning of the semi-final match against Soviet Union, which ended in a 0–0 draw; Italy subsequently advanced to the final on a coin toss. Despite playing the entire game with a muscle strain, Rivera put in a strong performance during the semi-final.

=== 1970 World Cup ===
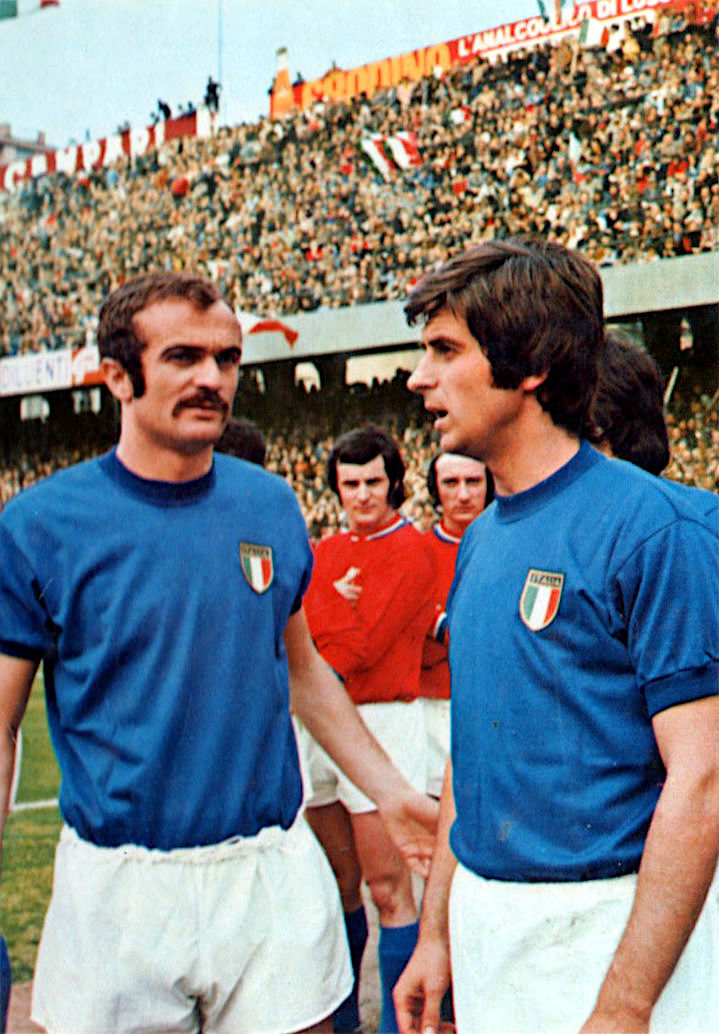
Rivera playing for Italy alongside Sandro Mazzola; the two players would be involved in manager Ferruccio Valcareggi's "Staffetta" policy at the 1970 FIFA World Cup.

Rivera subsequently played with the Squadra Azzurra (Italy national team) in the 1970 FIFA World Cup hosted by Mexico. At the prime of his career, much was expected of him throughout the tournament; after a slow start, his excellent form in the knock-out stages saw him become Italy's star player throughout the competition, as they reached the final, only to lose out 4–1 to a Pelé-led Brazil side. Prior to the tournament, the Italian team was thrown into turmoil following Pietro Anastasi's last-minute injury, which ruled the striker out of the competition; Roberto Boninsegna and Pierino Prati were called up in his place, while Giovanni Lodetti, who was Rivera's midfield partner and defensive foil at Milan, was dropped from the team; as a result, Rivera was at the centre of controversy when he accused the Italy national team supervisor Walter Mandelli of leading a media campaign against him, and of also wanting to exclude him from the team, which only put his place on the team in further jeopardy. Furthermore, the Italian coach at the 1970 World Cup Finals, Ferruccio Valcareggi, believed that Rivera and his fellow right-sided playmaker teammate Sandro Mazzola could not play together on the same field, as they played in similar positions for rival clubs. Although Rivera was arguably the more famous of the two stars at the time, as the reigning European Footballer of the Year, Valcareggi elected to start Mazzola, due to his pace, stamina, superior work rate, and stronger physical and athletic attributes, which he deemed more important in the tournament, and Rivera missed out on Italy's opening two group matches, with his absence being blamed on "stomach troubles"; he made his first appearance of the tournament in Italy's final group match, a 0–0 draw against Israel on 11 June, coming on for Angelo Domenghini. Due to Rivera's frequent arguments with the Italian coaching staff over his limited playing time, his mentor Rocco had to be flown in to prevent him from leaving the squad.

By the second round of the tournament, however, the Italian offence failed to sparkle. Although Rivera's playing style involved less running, physicality, tactical discipline, and work off the ball than Mazzola's, and made Italy less compact and more vulnerable defensively, it also allowed his team to control possession in midfield, due to Rivera's ability to dictate the play with his passing moves, provide accurate long passes, and create more chances for the team's strikers. When Mazzola came down with a stomach flu, and struggled to regain full match fitness for the knock-out round, Valcareggi therefore devised a controversial solution to play both players and get the best out of their abilities: the quicker and more hard-working Mazzola would start in the first half, while Rivera would come on at halftime, when the opposing teams would begin to tire, and the tempo of the game had slowed down, giving him more time to orchestrate goal scoring opportunities; this strategy was later dubbed the "staffetta" (relay). With this strategy, Rivera helped Italy defeat the hosts Mexico 4–1 in the quarterfinal on 14 June, scoring a goal, and also setting up both of Luigi Riva's goals, forming a notable offensive partnership with the Cagliari striker throughout the knock-out stages of the tournament.

"I told myself, there's no other alternative for me but to get the ball, take it past everyone and score."

— Rivera on his mental state following his error which led to West Germany's temporary equaliser in extra-time of the 1970 World Cup semi-final, and ahead of his match-winning goal one minute later.

In the semi-final against West Germany, at the Estadio Azteca on 17 June, Rivera played a major role in one of the most entertaining games in World Cup history, a match which was later dubbed The Game of the Century. Following a 1–1 draw after regulation time, Rivera's long passes led to Tarcisio Burgnich's and Luigi Riva's goals in extra-time, although he was later also at fault for Germany's equaliser; while defending against a German set-piece, Rivera briefly stepped away from the post, leaving it unmarked, and allowing Gerd Müller to score his second goal and tie the match at 3–3 in the 110th minute, which famously led Italy's temperamental goalkeeper Enrico Albertosi to berate Rivera for the error. A minute later, however, Rivera started an attacking play from the ensuing kick-off, a move which he eventually proceeded to finish off himself, scoring Italy's match-winning goal from Roberto Boninsegna's low cross to give Italy a 4–3 victory, after advancing into the penalty area unmarked, and sending German goalkeeper Sepp Maier the wrong way with his first-time shot.

"I was worried that Rivera would come on, I thought that with Rivera Italy would be more dangerous."

— Pelé on Rivera's limited playing time in the 1970 FIFA World Cup Final.

However, despite Rivera being the hero of Italy's past two matches, in the final against Brazil, Valcareggi did not use Rivera until there were only six minutes left in the game when he came on for Boninsegna with Italy trailing 3–1. Although the two creative Italian stars Rivera and Mazzola were finally able to play alongside each other, it was too late to overturn the result, and Brazil won the match 4–1 to capture the title. Valcareggi later justified his decision to neither start Rivera nor bring him on at half time, when the score was tied at 1–1, stating that several players in the starting line-up were in poor physical condition prior to the final, and that he was concerned that they would need to be substituted during the match, and as a result, waited longer than usual before bringing on Rivera. Despite reaching the final, the Italian team and Valcareggi endured much criticism from the Italian public and media upon their return to Italy, in particular due to the "staffetta" policy, and Rivera's limited playing time in the heavy final defeat; Rivera was largely exempt from the criticism, however, due to his decisive performances throughout the tournament. For his performances throughout the calendar year, Rivera placed tenth in the 1970 Ballon d'Or.

=== Later years ===
"Rivera, Rivera, Rivera, Rivera."

— England manager Alf Ramsey's response when asked to name the four strongest Italian players following Italy's 1–0 win over England in a friendly match at Wembley Stadium on 14 November 1973.

Rivera also played in the 1974 FIFA World Cup, wearing the number 10 shirt for Italy, and finally appearing alongside Mazzola, who was deployed on the wing. He scored a goal in the team's opening group stage against Haiti, but he did not appear in the decisive final group match, in which the ageing Italians were knocked out of the tournament by Poland following a 2–1 loss. The 1974 World Cup elimination marked the end of Rivera's international career; his last appearance with Italy came in the team's second group fixture, a 1–1 draw against Argentina, on 19 June. In total, he played in 60 games for Italy, scoring 14 goals in the process; he is the second highest-scoring midfielder for Italy post-World War II, behind only Daniele De Rossi, and the third-highest scoring midfielder for Italy overall, behind Adolfo Baloncieri and De Rossi. Rivera participated in four World Cups with Italy, making nine appearances in total and scoring three goals. He captained the national side on four occasions.

== Retirement ==
=== Milan vice-president ===
After retirement, Rivera became a vice-president at Milan for seven seasons. When Silvio Berlusconi bought the club in 1986, he resigned from his position and entered politics.

=== Political career ===
Rivera started his career in politics in 1986, becoming a member of the Italian Parliament in 1987 with the Christian Democracy party. He was re-elected in 1992, in 1994 under the Segni Pact, and in 1996 under the Uniti nell'Ulivo coalition. He served as an under-secretary for defense under Romano Prodi's government and later as a non-inscrit Member of the European Parliament (MEP).

=== FIGC President ===
In 2013 Rivera was appointed by the Italian Football Federation (FIGC) as President of the Technical Sector (settore tecnico), which oversees the training and qualification of technical staff employed by the FIGC and is headquartered at the Coverciano in Florence.

== Player profile ==
=== Style of play ===
"Yes, he doesn't run a lot, but if I want good football, creativity, the art of turning around a situation from the first to the ninetieth minute, only Rivera can give me all of this with his flashes. I wouldn't want to exaggerate, because in the end it's only football, but Rivera in all of this is a genius."

— Nereo Rocco on Rivera.

Rivera was an efficient offensive midfield playmaker, who possessed exceptional footballing intelligence, and class. Rivera was capable of playing anywhere in midfield or along the front line, but he was usually used in a free role, either as a deep-lying playmaker in central midfield, as an offensive–minded central midfielder (known as the "mezzala" role, in Italian), or most frequently as a classic number 10 behind the forward; he was also deployed as a deep-lying or inside forward on occasion, and at the beginning of his career, he was even occasionally used in a central role as a main striker, while at Alessandria, and as a winger on either flank, with the Italian Olympic side, in particular on the right side of the pitch. Although he was not known for his defensive abilities, and lacked both notable stamina and pace, as well as significant physical attributes due to his small stature and slender build, he was a talented right-footed player, who was renowned for his vision, tactical intelligence, and his skilful yet effective style of play, despite his poor defensive work-rate.

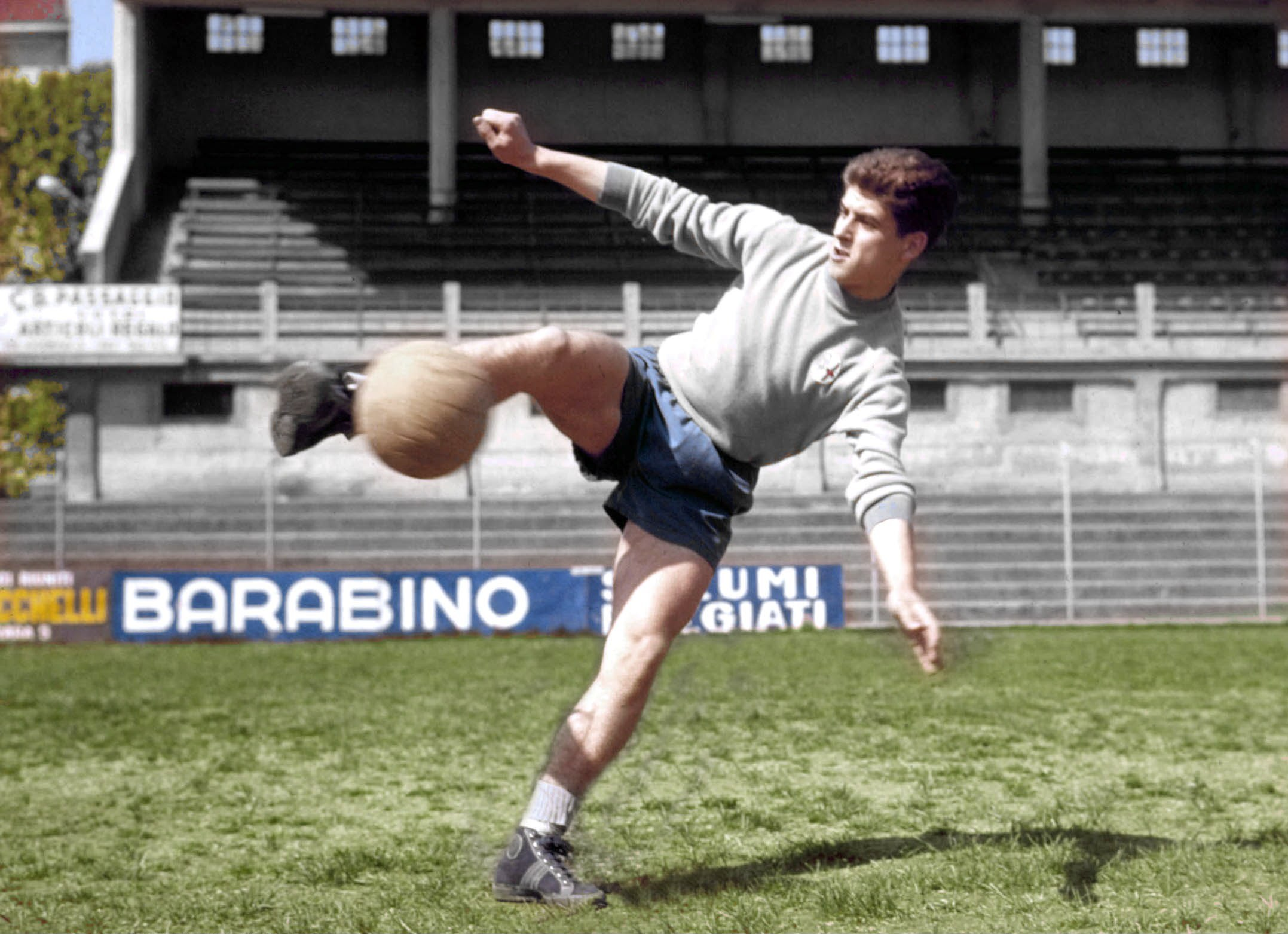
A young Rivera in training with Alessandria, c. late 1950s and early 1960s.

Rivera was highly regarded for his outstanding ball control, dribbling skills, and excellent technique, as well as his quick feet, acceleration over short distances, agility, and balance on the ball, which allowed him to change direction quickly, and dribble past players with ease. Despite his notable skill, technical ability, and elegance on the ball, Rivera would often avoid challenging defenders gratuitously in one on one situations, making unnecessary flashy moves or plays, or undertaking individual dribbling runs, in particular in his later career, unless he deemed them necessary; as such, he was known to be an efficient player, who preferred instead to create space and chances for his team through his precise passing game and offensive movement. Indeed, above all, Rivera was known for his excellent vision, ability to interpret the game, and his sublime range of passing, which allowed him to control the game and dictate the tempo his team's play in midfield with short exchanges, spread long passes across the pitch, or even play the ball first time, and also made him an excellent assist provider from any position on the field, with either foot; in 2011, former playmaker and UEFA president Michel Platini described Rivera as one of the greatest passers in the history of the sport.

"You watch footage from those years now and everyone seems slower than now, Rivera perhaps slower still and keeping the ball too much, but his forte was in spraying inspired passes around and always going forward, with a more than average eye for goal for a midfielder..."

— ESPN columnist Roberto Gotta on Rivera's playing style.

Despite being primarily a creative midfielder, and a team player, who preferred assisting teammates over scoring goals himself, Rivera was also known for his ability to make attacking runs and for his keen eye for goal; an accurate finisher from both inside and outside the area, he is the highest-scoring midfielder in Serie A history, and the third highest-scoring midfielder in the history of the Italy national team. He was also an accurate set piece and penalty-kick taker. Rivera is widely considered to be one of the greatest Italian footballers and one of the most talented advanced playmakers of all time, as well as one of the best players of his generation. In addition to his footballing ability, Rivera was also highly regarded throughout his career for his composure under pressure, his correct behaviour on the pitch, longevity, and his vocal leadership, although his outspoken personality also led him to be involved in several controversial clashes with managers, officials, and the media. Indeed, he was one of the first players to openly speak out in criticism of journalists and directors.

=== Reception and legacy ===
"[Rivera] was ... one of the greatest passers of all time who was known for his impeccable dribbling and distribution. In addition, Gianni Rivera was a true gentleman, both on and off the field of play, and he has remained so to this day."

— Michel Platini speaking on Rivera being honoured with the UEFA President's Award in 2011.

Regarded as one of Italy's and Milan's greatest ever footballers, one of the best players of his generation, one of the greatest midfielders of all time, and one of the most talented advanced playmakers of all time, in 1999, Rivera placed 19th in IFFHS's election for the World Player of the 20th Century, and was also chosen by the same federation as Italy's best player of the Century, and the 12th-best European player of the Century; he was also selected as Milan's best player of the 20th Century in a poll organised by La Gazzetta dello Sport. In 2004, Pelé chose Rivera as part of the FIFA 100 greatest living footballers, and he placed 35th in the UEFA Golden Jubilee Poll. In 2011, he was the recipient of the UEFA President's Award, which recognises outstanding achievements as a footballer, professional excellence and exemplary personal qualities. In 2013, Sam Tighe of Bleacher Report included Rivera in his list of the "50 Greatest Midfielders in the History of World Football." That same year, he was inducted into the Italian Football Hall of Fame, and in 2014, he was named the 80th greatest player in World Cup history by The Guardian, ahead of the FIFA World Cup in Brazil. In 2015, he became the first Italian footballer out of 100 athletes to be inducted into Italy's sports Walk of Fame. That same year, journalists of La Gazzetta dello Sport elected the greatest Italian player of all time, with Rivera finishing in first place.

== Outside of professional football ==
=== AIC ===
On 3 July 1968, Rivera founded the Italian Footballers' Association (AIC), in Milan, along with several fellow footballers, such as Giacomo Bulgarelli, Sandro Mazzola, Ernesto Castano, Giancarlo De Sisti, and Giacomo Losi, as well as the recently retired Sergio Campana, also a lawyer, who was appointed president of the association.

=== Personal life ===
Rivera is married to Laura Marconi; together they have two children: Chantal (born in 1994) and Gianni (born in 1996). He has another daughter, Nicole (born in 1977), with the Italian former actress and television personality Elisabetta Viviani, with whom he was in a relationship at the time.

=== Media ===
Rivera is featured in the EA Sports football video games FIFA 11, FIFA 14 and FIFA 15's Classic XI – a multi-national all-star team, along with compatriots Bruno Conti, Giacinto Facchetti, and Franco Baresi.

In 2012, Rivera took part in the eighth season of Ballando con le Stelle (the Italian edition of Dancing with the Stars), on Rai 1.

== Career statistics ==
=== Club ===
Appearances and goals by club, season and competition
Club	Season	League			Coppa Italia		Europe		Other		Total	
Club	Season	Division	Apps	Goals	Apps	Goals	Apps	Goals	Apps	Goals	Apps	Goals
Alessandria	1958–59	Serie A	1	0			–		–		1	0
Alessandria	1959–60	Serie A	25	6			–		–		25	6
Alessandria	Total		26	6			–		–		26	6
AC Milan	1960–61	Serie A	30	6	1	0	–		2 (Note: Appearances in Coppa dell'Amicizia)	0	33	6
AC Milan	1961–62	Serie A	27	10	1	0	2 (Note: Appearances in Inter-Cities Fairs Cup)	0	0	0	30	10
AC Milan	1962–63	Serie A	27	9	0	0	7 (Note: Appearances in European Cup)	2	–		34	11
AC Milan	1963–64	Serie A	27	7	1	0	2	1	2 (Note: Appearances in Intercontinental Cup)	0	32	8
AC Milan	1964–65	Serie A	29	2	0	0	0	0	–		29	2
AC Milan	1965–66	Serie A	31	7	1	0	4	1	–		36	8
AC Milan	1966–67	Serie A	34	12	6	7	2 (Note: Appearances in Mitropa Cup)	0	1 (Note: Appearance in Cup of the Alps)	0	43	19
AC Milan	1967–68	Serie A	29	11	5	3	10 (Note: Appearances in European Cup Winners' Cup)	1	–		44	15
AC Milan	1968–69	Serie A	28	3	4	1	7	2	–		39	6
AC Milan	1969–70	Serie A	25	8	3	1	3	2	2	1	33	12
AC Milan	1970–71	Serie A	26	6	10	7	–		–		36	13
AC Milan	1971–72	Serie A	23	3	6	2	8 (Note: Appearances in UEFA Cup)	4	–		37	9
AC Milan	1972–73	Serie A	28	17	6	3	9	0	–		43	20
AC Milan	1973–74	Serie A	26	6	5	1	6	0	2 (Note: Appearances in European Super Cup)	0	39	7
AC Milan	1974–75	Serie A	27	3	4	0	–		–		31	3
AC Milan	1975–76	Serie A	14	1	5	1	3	0	–		22	2
AC Milan	1976–77	Serie A	27	4	7	0	5	0	–		39	4
AC Milan	1977–78	Serie A	30	6	5	1	1	0	–		36	7
AC Milan	1978–79	Serie A	13	1	4	1	5	0	–		22	2
AC Milan	Total		501	122	74	28	74	13	9	1	658	164
Career total			527	128	74	28	74	13	9	1	684	170

=== International ===
Appearances and goals by national team and year
National team	Year	Apps	Goals
Italy	1962	4	2
Italy	1963	5	2
Italy	1964	4	2
Italy	1965	6	1
Italy	1966	6	2
Italy	1967	4	0
Italy	1968	4	0
Italy	1969	3	0
Italy	1970	7	2
Italy	1971	3	0
Italy	1972	3	0
Italy	1973	7	2
Italy	1974	4	1
Total	60		14

Scores and results list Italy's goal tally first, score column indicates score after each Rivera goal.

List of international goals scored by Gianni Rivera
No.	Date	Venue	Opponent	Score	Result	Competition
1	2 December 1962	Stadio Comunale, Bologna, Italy	Turkey	1–0	6–0	1964 European Nations' Cup qualification
2	2 December 1962	Stadio Comunale, Bologna, Italy	Turkey	5–0	6–0	1964 European Nations' Cup qualification
3	10 November 1963	Stadio Olimpico, Rome, Italy	Soviet Union	1–1	1–1	1964 European Nations' Cup qualification
4	14 December 1963	Stadio Comunale, Turin, Italy	Austria	1–0	1–0	Friendly
5	10 May 1964	Stade Olympique de la Pontaise, Lausanne, Switzerland	Switzerland	3–1	3–1	Friendly
6	4 November 1964	Stadio Luigi Ferraris, Genoa, Italy	Finland	3–0	6–1	1966 FIFA World Cup qualification
7	1 November 1965	Stadio Olimpico, Rome, Italy	Poland	4–0	6–1	1966 FIFA World Cup qualification
8	29 June 1966	Stade Cominale, Florence, Italy	Mexico	3–0	5–0	Friendly
9	29 June 1966	Stade Cominale, Florence, Italy	Mexico	5–0	5–0	Friendly
10	14 June 1970	Estadio Luis Dosal, Toluca, Mexico	Mexico	3–1	4–1	1970 FIFA World Cup
11	17 June 1970	Estadio Azteca, Mexico City, Mexico	West Germany	4–3	4–3 (a.e.t.)	1970 FIFA World Cup
12	31 March 1973	Stadio Luigi Ferraris, Genoa, Italy	Luxembourg	3–0	5–0	1974 FIFA World Cup qualification
13	20 October 1973	Stadio Olimpico, Rome, Italy	Switzerland	1–0	2–0	1974 FIFA World Cup qualification
14	15 June 1974	Olympiastadion, Munich, West Germany	Haiti	1–1	3–1	1974 FIFA World Cup

== Honours ==
AC Milan

- Serie A: 1961–62, 1967–68, 1978–79
- Coppa Italia: 1966–67, 1971–72, 1972–73, 1976–77
- European Cup: 1962–63, 1968–69
- European Cup Winners' Cup: 1967–68, 1972–73
- Intercontinental Cup: 1969

Italy

- UEFA European Championship: 1968
- FIFA World Cup runner-up: 1970

Individual

- Coppa Italia top scorer: 1966–67, 1970–71
- Ballon d'Or: 1969, runner-up: 1963
- World XI: 1967
- FUWO European Team of the Season: 1969, 1970
- Serie A Top-scorer: 1972–73 (shared with Giuseppe Savoldi and Paolino Pulici)
- IFFHS Italian Player of the 20th Century: 1999
- IFFHS European Player of the 20th Century (12th): 1999
- IFFHS World Player of the 20th Century: (19th)
- AC Milan Player of the 20th Century: 1999
- Golden Foot "Football Legends": 2003
- FIFA 100
- UEFA Golden Jubilee Poll: No. 35
- AC Milan Hall of Fame
- UEFA President's Award: 2011
- Inducted into the Italian Football Hall of Fame: 2013
- Inducted into the Walk of Fame of Italian sport: 2015
