= Lamberto Giorgis =

Italian footballer and manager (1932–2019)

Personal information
- Date of birth: 1932
- Date of death: 30 August 2019 (aged 87)
- Position: Midfielder

Senior career*
Years	Team	Apps	(Gls)
1953–1961	Taranto		
- Modena
- Carpi

Managerial career
- 1977–1978: Lecce
- 1978–1979: Sampdoria
- Foggia
- Pisa
- * Club domestic league appearances and goals

Lamberto Giorgis (1932 – 30 August 2019) was an Italian football player and manager.

== Playing career ==
Giorgis played for Taranto between 1953 and 1961, making a total of 206 appearances for the club in Serie B and Serie C. He later played for Modena and Carpi.

== Coaching career ==
After retiring as a player, Giorgis became a coach, and managed a number of club sides including Lecce, Sampdoria, Foggia and Pisa.
