= Urano Navarrini =

Italian footballer and manager (1945–2020)

Personal information
- Date of birth: 2 May 1945
- Place of birth: Verona, Italy
- Date of death: 18 April 2020 (aged 74)
- Place of death: Milan, Italy
- Height: 1.68 m (5 ft 6 in)
- Position: Winger

Youth career
- Grunland Milanese Libertas
- AC Milan

Senior career*
Years	Team	Apps	(Gls)
1964–1966	AC Milan	1	(0)
1964–1965	→ Pistoiese (loan)	18	(1)
1966–1968	Savona	26	(4)
1968–1969	Taranto	2	(0)
1969–1970	Verbania	36	(2)
1970–1975	Novara	111	(3)
- Pro Patria
Total		194	(10)

Managerial career
- Pro Patria
- Aosta
- 1982–1983: Sorrento
- Vigevano
- * Club domestic league appearances and goals

Urano Navarrini, also known as Urano Benigni (2 May 1945 – 18 April 2020) was an Italian professional football player and manager.

== Early and personal life ==
Born in Verona, Navarrini was the illegitimate son of Nuto Navarrini, and was known as Urano Benigni until recognised by his father in 1972.

== Career ==
Navarrini played as a winger for Grunland Milanese Libertas, AC Milan, Pistoiese, Savona, Taranto, Verbania, Novara and Pro Patria.

After retiring he managed a number of Italian clubs, including Pro Patria, Aosta, and Vigevano.

== Later life and death ==
He died in Milan on 18 April 2020, aged 74, from coronavirus.
