= Giorgio Rossano =

Italian footballer

Personal information
- Date of birth: 20 March 1939
- Place of birth: Turin, Italy
- Date of death: 13 February 2016 (aged 76)
- Height: 1.74 m (5 ft 8 1/2 in)
- Position: Striker

Senior career*
| Years | Team | Apps | (Gls) |
| 1958–1959 | Pordenone | 30 | (3) |
| 1959–1960 | Juventus | 1 | (0) |
| 1960–1961 | Bari | 26 | (4) |
| 1961–1962 | Juventus | 10 | (0) |
| 1962–1963 | Milan | 3 | (1) |
| 1963–1964 | Juventus | 0 | (0) |
| 1964–1965 | Palermo | 12 | (4) |
| 1965–1966 | Chieri | | |
- * Club domestic league appearances and goals

Giorgio Rossano (20 March 1939 – 13 February 2016) was an Italian professional footballer who played as a striker. He represented Italy at the 1960 Summer Olympics.

== Honours ==
=== Club ===
Juventus

- Serie A champion: 1959–60

AC Milan

- European Cup: 1962–63

=== International ===
- Represented Italy at the 1960 Summer Olympics
