= Lucio Dell'Angelo =

Italian football player and coach (1938–2013)

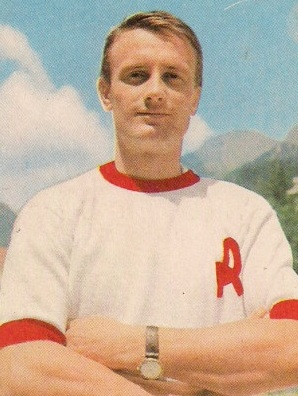

Personal information
- Date of birth: 18 April 1938
- Place of birth: Lucinico, Gorizia, Italy
- Date of death: 1 January 2013 (aged 74)
- Place of death: Viareggio, Italy
- Height: 1.77 m (5 ft 10 in)
- Position: Midfielder

Senior career*
Years	Team	Apps	(Gls)
1955–1956	Venzone		
1956–1957	AC Milan	0	(0)
1957–1958	Massese	18	(6)
1958–1959	Fiorentina	2	(0)
1959	Alessandria	0	(0)
1959–1961	Prato	58	(8)
1961–1963	Fiorentina	60	(6)
1963–1965	Vicenza	55	(6)
1965–1966	Hellas Verona	39	(1)
1966–1969	Atalanta	82	(4)
1969–1972	Mantova	74	(7)
1972–1973	Monza	6	(0)
1973–1976	Prato	72	(8)

International career
1963	Italy B	1	(0)

Managerial career
- 1977–1978: Prato
- 1978–1979: Viareggio
- * Club domestic league appearances and goals

Lucio Dell'Angelo (18 April 1938 – 1 January 2013) was an Italian professional football player and coach.

Dell'Angelo was born in Lucinico, Gorizia, Italy.

After his prolonged illness, Dell'Angelo died on 1 January 2013, in the Versilia hospital in Viareggio, at the age of 74.
