= Emanuele Del Vecchio =

Brazilian footballer and manager (1934–1995)

Del Vecchio
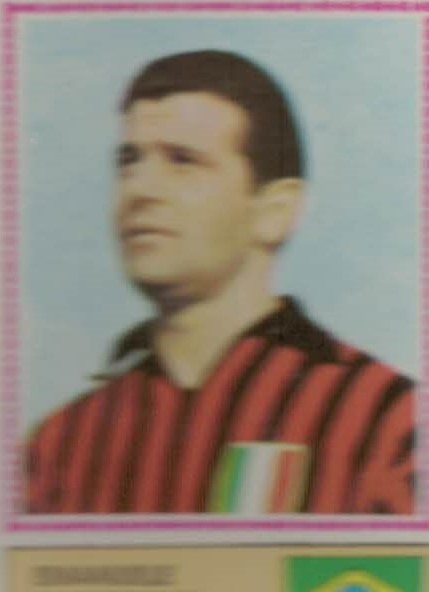

Personal information
- Full name: Emanuele Del Vecchio
- Date of birth: 24 September 1934
- Place of birth: São Vicente, São Paulo, Brazil
- Date of death: 7 October 1995 (aged 61)
- Place of death: Santos, São Paulo, Brazil
- Height: 1.75 m (5 ft 9 in)
- Position: Forward

Senior career*
Years	Team	Apps	(Gls)
1954–1957	Santos	180	(105)
1957–1958	Verona	27	(13)
1959–1961	Napoli	68	(27)
1961–1962	Padova	21	(8)
1962	Milan	9	(3)
1962–1963	Padova	4	(0)
1963–1964	Boca Juniors	6	(3)
1964–1967	São Paulo	69	(34)
1967	Bangu		
1968–1970	Atlético Paranaense		

International career
1956–1957	Brazil	9	(1)

Managerial career
- 1984: Santos
- 1986: Internacional de Limeira
- * Club domestic league appearances and goals

Emanuele Del Vecchio (24 September 1934 – 7 October 1995) was a Brazilian football forward, who played for the Brazil national team.

== Club career ==
Born in São Vicente, São Paulo, Del Vecchio started his career in 1954, defending Santos, and being part of the squad that won the Campeonato Paulista in 1955 and in 1956, finishing as that competition's top goalscorer with 23 goals in 1955. He then transferred to Italy, where he scored 13 goals in the 27 Italian Serie A games he played for Verona. Del Vecchio then played 68 Italian League games and scored 27 goals for Napoli, before moving to Padova, where he scored eight goals in 21 games. After joining Milan, he won the local league in 1962, and scored three goals in the nine games he played for the club. Del Vecchio returned to Padova in 1962, playing four more games for the club. He played six Argentine League games and scored three goals for Boca Juniors of Argentina, before returning to Brazil where he played for São Paulo, Bangu and Atlético Paranaense before retiring.

== International career ==
Del Vecchio played nine games and scored a goal for the Brazil national team in 1956 and 1957. Among the games he played include four appearances in the South American Championship in 1956, where the Brazilian team managed a fourth–place finish. Del Vecchio played his first game on 24 January 1956, against Chile, scoring his only goal for the national team on 16 June 1957, against Portugal. He played his last game on 10 July 1957, against Argentina. Defending his country, he won the Roca Cup in 1957.

== Honours ==
=== Club ===
Milan

- Serie A: 1961–62

Santos

- Campeonato Paulista: 1955, 1956

=== International ===
Brazil

- Roca Cup: 1957

=== Individual ===
- Campeonato Paulista top goalscorer: 1955
