= Luigi Balzarini =

Italian footballer

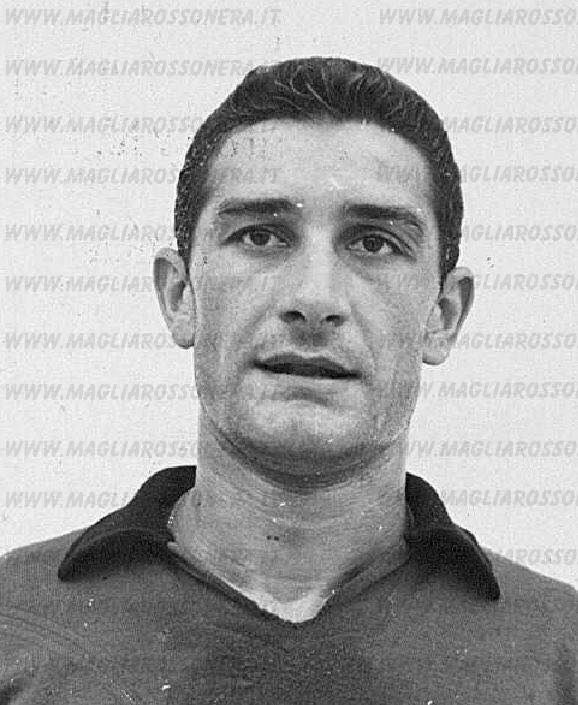
- Luigi Balzarini.

Personal information
- Full name: Luigi Balzarini
- Date of birth: 29 April 1935
- Place of birth: Masera, Italy
- Date of death: 12 February 2014 (aged 78)
- Height: 1.82 m (6 ft 0 in)
- Position: Goalkeeper

Youth career
- Juventus Domo

Senior career*
Years	Team	Apps	(Gls)
1956–1959	Brescia	60	(0)
1959–1963	Modena	113	(0)
1963–1966	Milan	15	(0)
1966–1967	Lecco	13	(0)
1967–1968	Atalanta	7	(0)
1968–1969	Lecco	14	(0)
1969–1970	Piacenza	23	(0)
Total		245	(0)
- * Club domestic league appearances and goals

Luigi Balzarini (29 April 1935 – 12 February 2014) was an Italian footballer, who played as a goalkeeper.

== Honours ==
=== Club ===
- Modena
  - Serie C: 1960–61 (girone A)
