= Amarildo =

Amarildo may mean:

- Amarildo (footballer, born 1939), full name Amarildo Tavares da Silveira, Brazilian football striker
- Amarildo (footballer, born 1964) (born 1964), full name Amarildo Souza do Amaral, Brazilian football striker
- Amarildo (footballer, born 1976), full name Amarildo Luis Souza da Silva, Brazilian football midfielder
- Amarildo (footballer, born 1999), full name Amarildo de Souza, Brazilian football forward
- Amarildo Almeida (born 1976), Guinea-Bissauan sprinter
- Amarildo Belisha (born 1981), Albanian football defender
- Amarildo Filho (born 1988), Brazilian politician
- Amarildo Zela (born 1972), retired Albanian footballer
