= Gilberto Noletti =

Italian footballer (1941–2024)

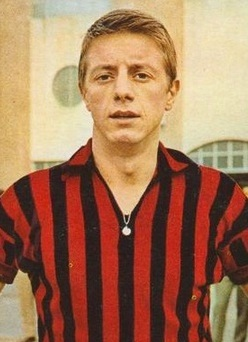
- Noletti in the 1960s

Personal information
- Date of birth: 9 May 1941
- Place of birth: Cusano Milanino, Italy
- Date of death: 28 April 2024 (aged 82)
- Place of death: Forlì, Italy
- Height: 1.77 m (5 ft 10 in)
- Position: Defender

Senior career*
Years	Team	Apps	(Gls)
1959–1961	AC Milan	3	(0)
1961–1962	Lazio	23	(0)
1962–1963	Juventus	14	(1)
1963–1967	AC Milan	72	(2)
1967–1968	Sampdoria	0	(0)
1968–1969	Lecco	18	(0)
1969–1972	Sorrento	75	(6)
1972–1973	Casertana	34	(0)
1973–1976	Grosseto	63	(5)
- * Club domestic league appearances and goals

Gilberto Noletti (9 May 1941 – 28 April 2024) was an Italian professional footballer who played as a defender. He represented Italy at the 1960 Summer Olympics. Noletti died in Forlì on 28 April 2024, 11 days before his 83rd birthday.
