= Víctor Benítez =

Peruvian footballer (1935–2022)

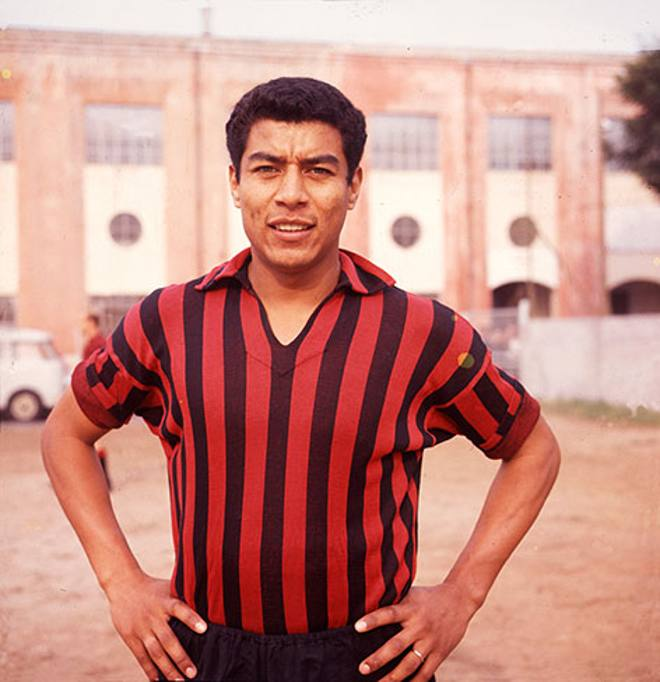
- Benítez in 1963

Personal information
- Full name: Víctor Benítez Morales
- Date of birth: 30 October 1935
- Place of birth: Lima, Peru
- Date of death: 11 July 2022 (aged 86)
- Place of death: Milan, Italy
- Height: 1.72 m (5 ft 8 in)
- Positions: Centre-back; defensive midfielder

Senior career*
Years	Team	Apps	(Gls)
1954–1959	Alianza Lima		
1960–1962	Boca Juniors	70	(5)
1962–1963	AC Milan	12	(1)
1963–1964	Messina	12	(2)
1964–1965	AC Milan	26	(1)
1965–1966	Roma		
1966–1967	Venezia	23	(3)
1967–1968	Inter Milan	8	(1)
1968–1970	Roma		
1971	Sporting Cristal		

International career
1957–1959	Peru	11	(0)
- * Club domestic league appearances and goals

Víctor Benítez Morales (12 September 1935 – 11 July 2022) was a Peruvian professional footballer who played as a centre-back or defensive midfielder. Nicknamed "El Conejo", he notably played for Italian clubs AC Milan, Roma and Inter Milan as well as Argentine club Boca Juniors. He won the European Cup title with AC Milan in 1963.

Along with José Velásquez, he is recognised as one of Peru's most important defensive midfielders of all time.

== Club career ==
Born in Lima, Peru, Benítez began his career with Alianza Lima in 1950s. He won two Peruvian league titles in 1954 and 1955. In 1960 he joined Argentine club Boca Juniors where he was part of the team that won the 1962 league championship.

Benítez moved to Italy in 1962, where he played for AC Milan, Messina, Roma, Venezia, and Inter Milan. In 1963, he was part of the AC Milan team that won the UEFA Champions League. He won a Coppa Italia title with Roma in 1969.

He returned to Peru in 1971 where he played out the remainder of his career with Sporting Cristal.

== International career ==
Between 1957 and 1959 he played 11 games for the Peru national team. He appeared for Peru in the Copa América in 1957 and 1959, playing in a total of seven games. Additionally, he played in FIFA World Cup qualification for his native country in 1957. On 17 May 1959, Benitez was part of the Peru national team which beat England 4–1 in Lima.

== Death ==
Benítez died in Italy on 11 July 2022 at the age of 86.

== Honours ==
Alianza Lima

- Peruvian League: 1954, 1955

Boca Juniors

- Primera División Argentina: 1962

AC Milan

- European Cup: 1962–63

Roma

- Coppa Italia: 1968–69
