= Germano (footballer, born 1942) =

Brazilian footballer

Personal information
- Full name: José Germano de Sales
- Date of birth: 25 March 1942
- Place of birth: Conselheiro Pena
- Date of death: 4 October 1997 (aged 55)
- Place of death: Conselheiro Pena
- Height: 1.68 m (5 ft 6 in)
- Position: Left winger

Senior career*
| Years | Team | Apps | (Gls) |
| 1959–1962 | Flamengo | 87 | (17) |
| 1962–1966 | AC Milan | 2 | (2) |
| 1962–1963 | → Genoa (loan) | 12 | (2) |
| 1965–1966 | → Palmeiras (loan) | 26 | (6) |
| 1966–1968 | Standard de Liège | | |

International career
| 1959 | Brazil | 8 | (4) |
Medal record
Men's Football
Representing Brazil
Pan American Games
| Silver medal – second place | 1959 Chicago |
- * Club domestic league appearances and goals

José Germano de Sales (25 March 1942 – 4 October 1997) was a Brazilian footballer.

Having been transferred to AC Milan from Flamengo in the summer of 1962 at the age of 20, he became the first ever black player to play for the Italian club. Despite a very successful start (3 goals in 5 games), he was soon loaned out to Genoa in November 1962, where he spent the rest of that season with 12 games and 2 goals for the Genoese club.

Germano also represented the Brazil national team at the 1959 Pan American Games, where the team won the silver medal.
