= Dario Barluzzi =

Italian footballer and manager (1935–2021)

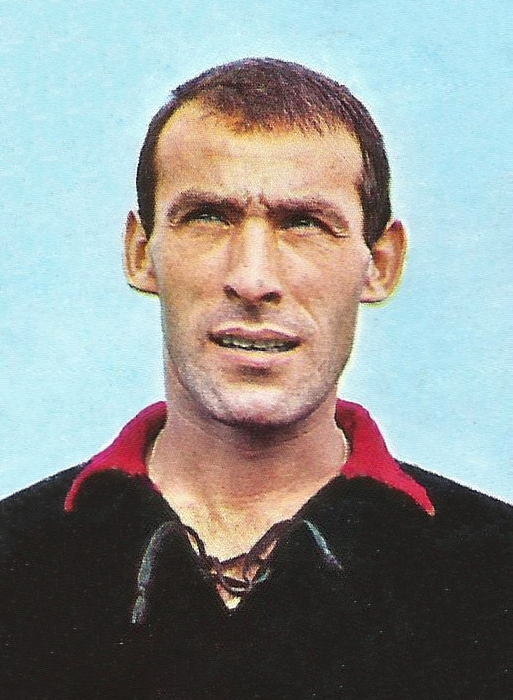
- Barluzzi c. 1965

Personal information
- Full name: Dario Giuliano Mario Barluzzi
- Date of birth: 6 September 1935
- Place of birth: Belluno, Italy
- Date of death: 13 October 2021 (aged 86)
- Place of death: Varese, Italy
- Height: 1.85 m (6 ft 1 in)
- Position: Goalkeeper

Youth career
- Belluno

Senior career*
Years	Team	Apps	(Gls)
1954–1961	Treviso	138	(0)
1961–1962	Catania	0	(0)
1962–1967	Milan	85	(0)
1967–1968	Internazionale	0	(0)
1968–1969	Mantova	7	(0)
1969–1973	Varese	8	(0)
Total		238	(0)

Managerial career
- 1982–1983: Varese
- * Club domestic league appearances and goals

Dario Giuliano Mario Barluzzi (6 September 1935 – 13 October 2021) was an Italian football player and manager who played as a goalkeeper. He made 85 appearances in Serie A for Milan, during the 1960s.

== Honours ==
A.C. Milan

- Coppa Italia: 1966–67
- European Cup: 1962–63
