= Giuliano Fortunato =

Italian footballer (1940–2022)

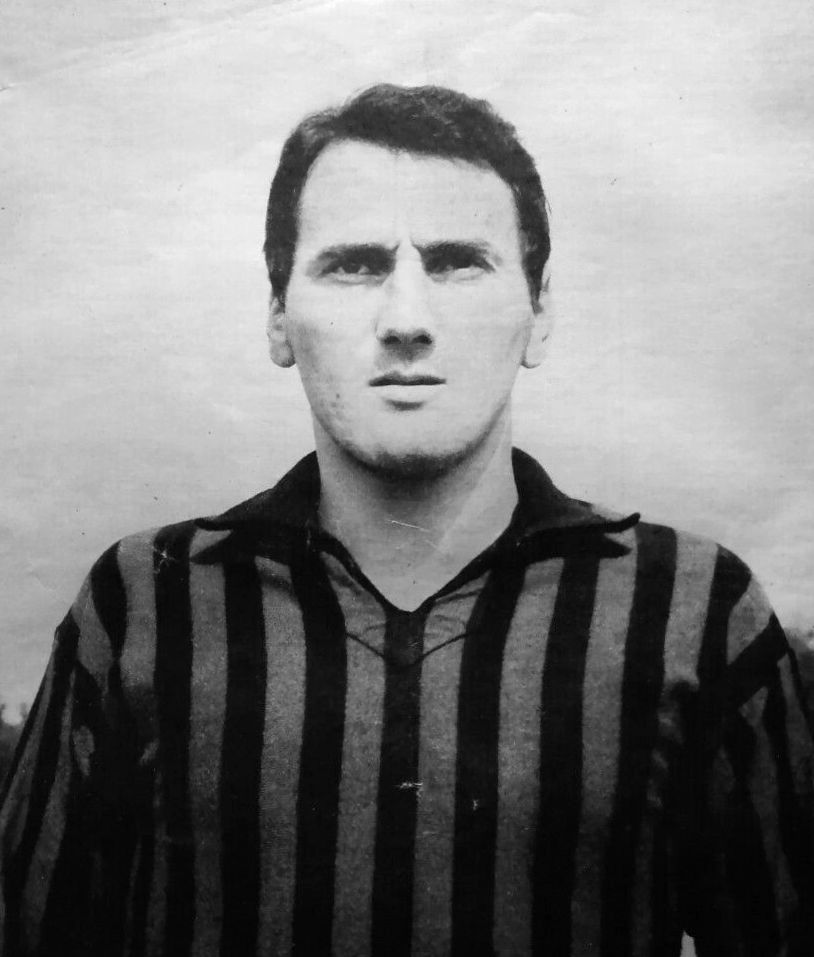
- Fortunato with A.C. Milan in 1966

Personal information
- Date of birth: 12 May 1940
- Place of birth: Tricesimo, Italy
- Date of death: 23 September 2022 (aged 82)
- Height: 1.70 m (5 ft 7 in)
- Position: Forward

Youth career
- Pro Gorizia

Senior career*
| Years | Team | Apps | (Gls) |
| 1957–1959 | Pro Gorizia | | |
| 1959–1961 | Triestina | 67 | (8) |
| 1961–1962 | Lanerossi Vicenza | 18 | (1) |
| 1962–1967 | Milan | 77 | (17) |
| 1967–1972 | Lazio | 132 | (16) |
| 1972–1974 | Lecce | 31 | (3) |
- * Club domestic league appearances and goals

Giuliano Fortunato (12 May 1940 – 23 September 2022) was an Italian professional footballer who played as a forward. He made 203 appearances and scored 34 goals in Serie A, most notably for Milan and Lazio, during the 1960s and early 1970s.

== Honours ==
A.C. Milan

- Coppa Italia: 1966–67
- European Cup: 1962–63

Lazio

- Serie B: 1968–69
- Coppa delle Alpi: 1971
