= 1961–62 AC Milan season =

AC Milan
1961–62 season
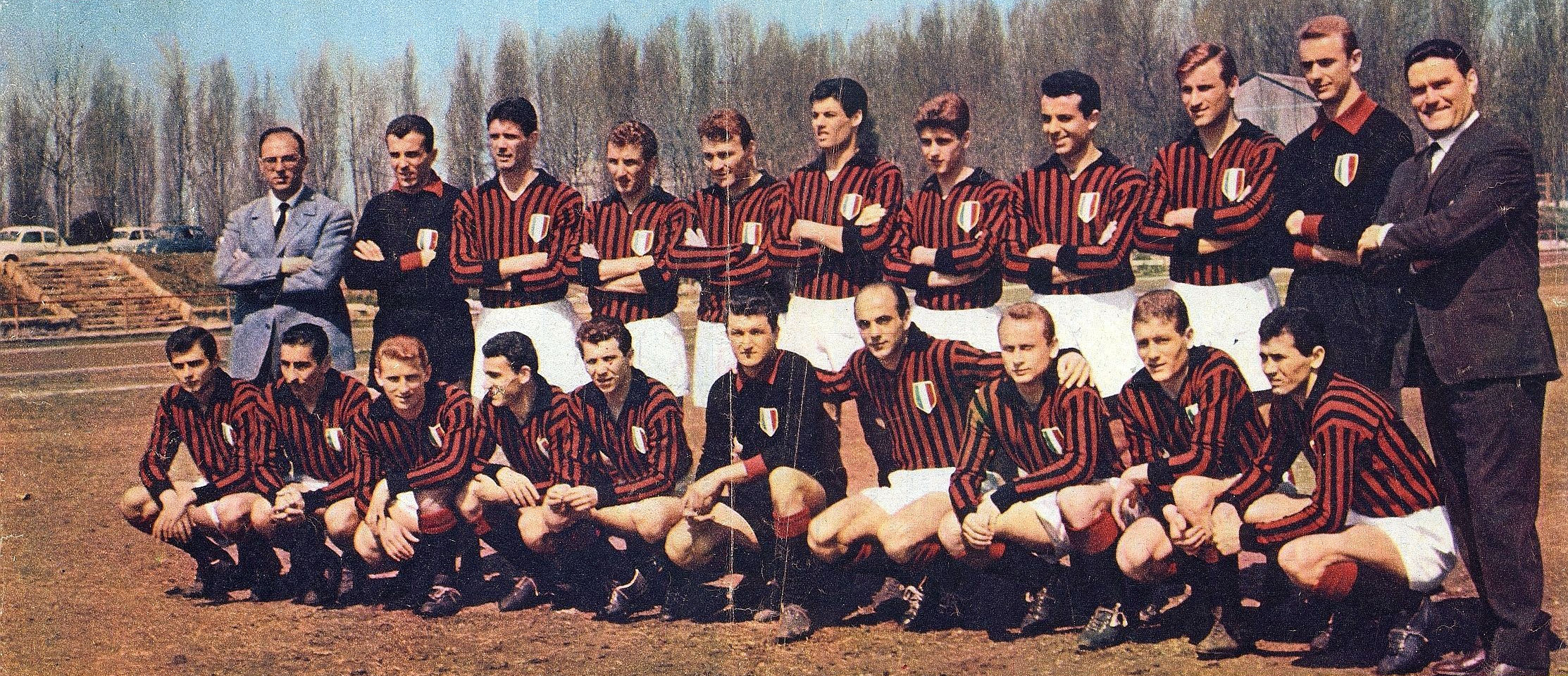
- Chairman: Andrea Rizzoli
- Manager: Nereo Rocco
- Stadium: San Siro
- Serie A: Winners
- Coppa Italia: Second round
- Fairs Cup: Round of 32
- Coppa dell'Amicizia: Semi-finals
- Top goalscorer: League: Altafini (22); All: Altafini (22)
- Average home league attendance: 42,061
| Home colours | Away colours |

The 1961–62 season saw AC Milan compete in Serie A, the Coppa Italia and the Fairs Cup. The club went on to win the Serie A. In the Coppa Italia they were knocked out by Mondena who played in Serie B.

== Summary ==
The 1961–62 season gave way to Nereo Rocco as newly appointed manager and Dino Sani's arrival (replacing Jimmy Greaves in November) that provided President Andrea Rizzoli with the right amount of talent to aim for a championship win.

Young star Gianni Rivera initially struggled to gain playing time under new manager Nereo Rocco during the 1961–62 season, his second at the club, also being linked with loans to Vicenza and Juventus, but won his way back into the starting line-up and played a decisive role, scoring 10 goals in the league. Throughout the season, Rivera formed an important relationship with the legendary manager and catenaccio mastermind; he played a key role in the club's successes under Rocco, who subsequently built a hard-working, winning team around Rivera that complemented the midfielder's creative playing style.

The season started with success at home against Juventus (5-1), and then created an unstoppable winning streak for Milan, that would see them only lose once in twenty-one matches. It would also be a defeat for Juventus back in their own home town that year, as Milan delivered a 4–2 win.

It would seem Rocco's only regret of the 1961–62 season would be in the Milano Derby as Inter won with the result 2–0. In spite of those who accused the father and pioneer of the real catenaccio, Milan gave way to dominate the field with eighty-three goals scored in thirty-four games (an average of 2.4 goals per match) and with thirty-four goals conceded. While Juventus was nowhere near the top contention that year, Inter, Fiorentina, and Bologna were the only true runner-ups for the scudetto race.

That same year, Milan played in the Fourth Inter-Cities Fairs Cup (this was the predecessor of the UEFA Europa League Cup), however, Milan did not go far and lost in the first round against the Yugoslavian team Novi Sad.

== Season squad ==
Note: Flags indicate national team as defined under FIFA eligibility rules; some limited exceptions apply. Players may hold more than one non-FIFA nationality.

| Pos. | Nation | Player |
|---|---|---|
| GK | ITA | Luciano Alfieri |
| GK | ITA | Giorgio Ghezzi |
| GK | ITA | Mario Liberalato |
| DF | ITA | Cesare Maldini (Captain) |
| DF | ITA | Antonio Pasinato |
| DF | ITA | Luigi Radice |
| DF | ITA | Sandro Salvadore |
| DF | ITA | Giovanni Trapattoni |
| DF | ITA | Mario Trebbi |
| DF | ITA | Francesco Zagatti (Captain in 1961) |
| MF | ITA | Mario David |
| MF | ITA | Giovanni Lodetti |
| MF | ITA | Ambrogio Pelagalli |

| Pos. | Nation | Player |
|---|---|---|
| MF | ITA | Gianni Rivera |
| MF | BRA | Dino Sani |
| MF | ITA | Sergio Tenente |
| FW | BRA | José Altafini |
| FW | ITA | Paolo Barison |
| FW | ITA | Bruno Beretti |
| FW | ITA | Oliviero Conti |
| FW | ITA | Giancarlo Danova |
| FW | ITA | Emanuele Del Vecchio |
| FW | URU | Alcides Ghiggia |
| FW | ITA | Gino Pivatelli |
| FW | ITA | Orlando Rozzoni |
| FW | ENG | Jimmy Greaves |

== Transfers ==
=== In ===
In
| Pos. | Name | from | Type |
|---|---|---|---|
| FW | Oliviero Conti | Vicenza | - |
| FW | Giancarlo Danova | Torino | - |
| FW | Emanuele Del Vecchio | Padova Calcio | - |
| FW | Paolo Ferrario | Lazio | - |
| FW | Alcides Ghiggia | Roma | - |
| FW | Jimmy Greaves | Chelsea F.C. | - |
| GK | Mario Liberalato | Mestrina | - |
| DF | Antonio Pasinato | Lecce | - |
| MF | Ambrogio Pelagalli | Atalanta | - |
| FW | Gino Pivatelli | Napoli | - |
| FW | Orlando Rozzoni | Udinese | - |
| MF | Dino Sani | Boca Juniors | - |
| MF | Sergio Tenente | Ascoli | - |

=== Out ===
Out
| Pos. | Name | to | Type |
|---|---|---|---|
| FW | Giovanni Fanello | Napoli | - |
| FW | Carlo Galli | Udinese | - |
| DF | Luigi Garagna | Grosseto | - |
| FW | Jimmy Greaves | Tottenham Hotspur | - |
| MF | Nils Liedholm | - | retired |
| FW | Mario Maraschi | Lazio | - |
| DF | Gilberto Noletti | Lazio | - |
| DF | Pierluigi Ronzon | Napoli | - |
| FW | Santiago Vernazza | Vicenza | - |

=== Loans ===
Note: Flags indicate national team as defined under FIFA eligibility rules; some limited exceptions apply. Players may hold more than one non-FIFA nationality.

| Pos. | Nation | Player |
|---|---|---|
| FW | ITA | Paolo Ferrario (to Lazio from November 1961) |

== Competitions ==
=== Serie A ===
==== League table ====
| Pos | Team | Pld | W | D | L | GF | GA | GD | Pts | Qualification or relegation |
|---|---|---|---|---|---|---|---|---|---|---|
| 1 | Milan (C) | 34 | 24 | 5 | 5 | 83 | 36 | +47 | 53 | Qualified for the European Cup |
| 2 | Internazionale | 34 | 19 | 10 | 5 | 59 | 31 | +28 | 48 | |
| 3 | Fiorentina | 34 | 19 | 8 | 7 | 57 | 32 | +25 | 46 | |
| 4 | Bologna | 34 | 19 | 7 | 8 | 57 | 41 | +16 | 45 | |
| 5 | Roma | 34 | 18 | 8 | 8 | 61 | 35 | +26 | 44 | Invited for the Inter-Cities Fairs Cup |

Source: Panini
(C) Champions

==== Results by round ====
| Round | 1 |
|---|---|
| Ground | |
| Result | |
| Position | |

Source: http://calcio-seriea.net/allenatori_squadra/1960/501/
A = Away; H = Home; W = Win; D = Draw; L = Loss; = Leader, European Cup; = Invited to 1961–62 Inter-Cities Fairs Cup; = Relegation to 1961–62 Serie B

==== Matches ====
| 27 August 1961 1 | Lanerossi Vicenza | 0–3 | Milan | Vicenza |
| | | Report | 29', 39'Altafini; 55' (pen.) Greaves | Stadium: Stadio Romeo Menti; Attendance: 20,000; Referee: Gennaro Marchese |

| 3 September 1961 2 | Milan | 3–0 | Catania | Milan |
| | Barison 50'; Radice 68'; Maldini 72' | Report | | Stadium: San Siro; Attendance: 26,900; Referee: Samani |

| 10 September 1961 3 | Palermo | 0–0 | Milan | Palermo |
| | | Report | | Stadium: Stadio La Favorita; Attendance: 37,500; Referee: Gastone Roversi |

| 13 September 1961 4 | Milan | 4–3 | Udinese | Milan |
| | Greaves 10', 24' (pen.); Sassi 22' (aut); Pivatelli 49' | Report | 30', 82' Pentrelli; 36' Canella | Stadium: San Siro; Attendance: 22,000; Referee: Antonio Sbardella |

| 17 September 1961 5 | Bologna | 1–0 | Milan | Bologna |
| | Bulgarelli 55' | Report | | Stadium: Comunale; Attendance: 32,500; Referee: Bruno De Marchi |

| 24 September 1961 6 | Milan | 2–3 | Sampdoria | Milan |
| | Greaves 43', 73' (pen.) | Report | 56' (pen.) Vincenzi; 62' Skoglund; 84' Veselinovic | Stadium: San Siro; Attendance: 47,500; Referee: Leita |

| 1 October 1961 7 | Inter | 1–3 | Milan | Milan |
| | Suarez 69' | Report | 18' Pivatelli; 53' Greaves; 87' Conti | Stadium: San Siro; Attendance: 77,500; Referee: Pietro Bonetto |

| 4 October 1961 8 | Venezia | 2–1 | Milan | Venice |
| | Siciliano 17'; Raffini 83' | Report | 62' Altafini | Stadium: Stadio Pier Luigi Penzo; Attendance: 22,000; Referee: Cesare Jonni |

| 8 October 1961 9 | Milan | 3–0 | Lecco | Milan |
| | Altafini 11'; Pivatelli 20', 68' | Report | | Stadium: San Siro; Attendance: 27,500; Referee: Francesco Francescon |

| 22 October 1961 10 | Milan | 3–1 | Roma | Milan |
| | David 54'; Pelagalli 77'; Greaves 89' | Report | 83' Orlando | Stadium: San Siro; Attendance: 54,100; Referee: Pietro Bonetto |

| 29 October 1961 11 | Fiorentina | 5–2 | Milan | Florence |
| | Hamrin 6', 56' (pen.); Milani 9', 16'; Petris 77' | Report | 39' (pen.), 65' Greaves | Stadium: Comunale; Attendance: 40,000; Referee: Iginio Rigato |

| 12 November 1961 12 | Milan | 5–1 | Juventus | Milan |
| | Altafini 3', 8', 76', 78'; Rivera 62' | Report | 38' Rosa | Stadium: San Siro; Attendance: 46,065; Referee: Iginio Rigato |

| 19 November 1961 13 | Padova | 1–1 | Milan | Padua |
| | Del Vecchio 43' | Report | 11'Altafini | Stadium: Stadio Silvio Appiani; Attendance: 22,000; Referee: Antonio Di Tonno |

| 26 November 1961 14 | Milan | 2–2 | Atalanta | Milan |
| | David 54' (pen.); Rivera 78' | Report | 68' Colombo; 80' Maschio | Stadium: San Siro; Attendance: 21,620; Referee: Gennaro Marchese |

| 3 December 1961 15 | Mantova Calcio | 1–2 | Milan | Mantova |
| | Allemann 28' | Report | 58' Pivatelli; 73'Rivera | Stadium: Stadio Danilo Martelli; Attendance: 32,500; Referee: Concetto Lo Bello |

| 10 December 1961 16 | Torino | 1–1 | Milan | Turin |
| | Crippa 49' | Report | 61' Altafini | Stadium: Comunale; Attendance: 45,000; Referee: Carlo Gambarotta |

| 17 December 1961 17 | Milan | 4–1 | SPAL | Milan |
| | David 17'; Rivera 50'; Danova 67', 77' | Report | 64' Mencacci | Stadium: San Siro; Attendance: 25,000; Referee: Carlo Gambarotta |

| 24 December 1961 18 | Milan | 4–1 | Lanerossi Vicenza | Milan |
| | Danova 11'; Altafini 48'; Sani 74', 87' | Report | 83' (rig) Kostic | Stadium: San Siro; Attendance: 14,800; Referee: Antonio Sbardella |

| 31 December 1961 19 | Catania | 1–3 | Milan | Catania |
| | Calvanese 27' | Report | 22', 28' Pivatelli; 30' Danova | Stadium: Stadio Cibali; Attendance: 23,000; Referee: Pietro Bonetto |

| 7 January 1962 20 | Milan | 3–0 | Palermo | Milan |
| | Danova 33'; Sani 44'; Barison 57' | Report | | Stadium: San Siro; Attendance: 25,000; Referee: Francesco Francescon |

| 14 January 1962 21 | Udinese | 0–1 | Milan | Udine |
| | | Report | 86' Altafini | Stadium: Stadio Moretti; Attendance: 20,000; Referee: Carlo Gambarotta |

| 22 January 1962 22 | Milan | 3–0 | Bologna | Milan |
| | Danova 21', 24', 31' | Report | | Stadium: San Siro; Attendance: 65,000; Referee: Iginio Rigato |

| 29 January 1962 23 | Sampdoria | 1–3 | Milan | Genoa |
| | Brighenti 29' | Report | 13' Conti; 44' Sani; 70'Rivera | Stadium: Stadio Luigi Ferraris; Attendance: 37,500; Referee: Iginio Rigato |

| 4 February 1962 24 | Milan | 0–2 | Inter | Milan |
| | | Report | 44' Morbello; 84' Suarez | Stadium: San Siro; Attendance: 82,400; Referee: Giuseppe Adami |

| 11 February 1962 25 | Milan | 1–0 | Venezia | Milan |
| | Altafini 32' | Report | | Stadium: San Siro; Attendance: 30,000; Referee: Antonio Sbardella |

| 18 February 1962 26 | Lecco | 2–2 | Milan | Lecce |
| | Di Giacomo 28'; Abbadie 49' | Report | 2' Barison; 38' Pivatelli | Stadium: Mario Rigamonti; Attendance: 20,000; Referee: Pietro Bonetto |

| 25 February 1962 27 | Roma | 0–1 | Milan | Rome |
| | | Report | 45' (o.g.) Losi | Stadium: Stadio Olimpico; Attendance: 55,500; Referee: Concetto Lo Bello |

| 4 March 1962 28 | Milan | 5–2 | Fiorentina | Milan |
| | Rivera 1'; Barison 16', 75'; Altafini 31', 40' | Report | 29', 80' Milani | Stadium: San Siro; Attendance: 62,673; Referee: Pietro Bonetto |

| 11 March 1962 29 | Juventus | 2–4 | Milan | Turin |
| | Charles 42'; Mora 87' (pen.) | Report | 11' Barison; 49' Sani; 53', 67' Altafini | Stadium: Comunale; Attendance: 37,000; Referee: Iginio Rigato |

| 18 March 1962 30 | Milan | 4–0 | Padova | Milan |
| | Rivera 5', 61'; Altafini 25'; Conti 63' | Report | | Stadium: San Siro; Attendance: 40,000; Referee: Antonio Sbardella |

| 25 March 1962 31 | Atalanta | 0–2 | Milan | Bergamo |
| | | Report | | Stadium: Comunale; Attendance: 24,000; Referee: Giuseppe Adami |

| 1 April 1962 32 | Milan | 1–0 | Mantova | Milan |
| | Rivera 29' | Report | | Stadium: San Siro; Attendance: 67,500; Referee: Francesco Francescon |

| 8 April 1962 33 | Milan | 4–2 | Torino | Milan |
| | Gerbaudo 5' (aut); Rivera 8'; Altafini 44', 73' | Report | 31' Crippa; 61' (rig) Locatelli | Stadium: San Siro; Attendance: 83,000; Referee: Concetto Lo Bello |

| 15 April 1962 34 | SPAL | 0–3 | Milan | Ferrara |
| | | Report | 30', 76' Altafini; 86' Conti | Stadium: Comunale; Attendance: 15,000; Referee: Carlo Gambarotta |

=== Coppa Italia ===
==== Second round ====
| 15 October 1961 | Milan | 0–1 | Modena | Milan |
| | | | 68' (pen.) Cuttica | Stadium: San Siro; Attendance: 3,300; Referee: Alessandro D'Agostini |

=== Coppa dell'Amicizia ===
==== Eightfinals ====
| 6 May 1962 | (France) Nice | 3–6 | Milan | Nice |
| | Dandru 18'; Barrou 55'; Alba 81' | | 5', 77' Del Vecchio; 8' Barison; 31' Conti; 58' (aut) Albert; 72' Sani | Stadium: Stade Municipal du Ray; Attendance: 6,000; Referee: (France) Guinnard |

| 13 May 1962 | Milan | 3–1 | (France) Nice | Milan |
| | Barison 1'; Sani 8', 60' | | 16' De Bourgoing | Stadium: San Siro; Attendance: 2,000; Referee: (France) Huber |

==== Quarterfinals ====
| 26 May 1962 | Milan | 5–2 | (France) Toulouse | Milan |
| | Rozzoni 7', 16', 42'; Lodetti 55'; Pivatelli 63' | | 11' Schultz; 87' Jubert | Stadium: San Siro; Attendance: 2,929; Referee: (France) Gulbert |

| 3 June 1962 | (France) Toulouse | 1–4 | Milan | Toulouse |
| | Redin 53' | | 8' Conti; 67' Zagatti; 88' Lodetti; 89' Barison | Stadium: Stadium Municipal; Attendance: 5,000 |

==== Semifinals ====
| 10 June 1962 | Torino | 2–1 | Milan | Turin |
| | Rosato 42'; Crippa 50' | | 74' Lodetti | Stadium: Stadio Filadelfia; Attendance: 7,000; Referee: Carlo Gambarotta |

| 14 June 1962 | Milan | 1–1 | Torino | Milan |
| | Rozzoni 75' | | 82' Ferrini | Stadium: San Siro; Attendance: 8,000; Referee: Iginio Rigato |

=== Fairs Cup ===
==== Round of 32 ====
| 30 August 1961 | Milan | 0–0 | (Socialist Federal Republic of Yugoslavia) Novi Sad | Milan |
| | | | . | Stadium: San Siro; Attendance: 20,000; Referee: (France) Faucheux |

| 20 September 1961 | (Socialist Federal Republic of Yugoslavia) Novi Sad | 2–0 | Milan | Novi Sad |
| | Takac 20'; Pavlic 50' | | | Stadium: Karađorđe Stadium; Attendance: 15,000; Referee: (Austria) Chebat |

== Statistics ==
=== Squad statistics ===
| Competition | Points | Home | | | | | | Away | | | | | | Total | | | | | | GD |
| Competition | Points | G | W | D | L | Gs | Ga | G | W | D | L | Gs | Ga | G | W | D | L | Gs | Ga | GD |
|---|---|---|---|---|---|---|---|---|---|---|---|---|---|---|---|---|---|---|---|---|
| 1961-62 Serie A | 53 | 17 | 14 | 1 | 2 | 51 | 18 | 17 | 10 | 4 | 3 | 32 | 18 | 34 | 24 | 5 | 5 | 83 | 36 | +47 |
| 1961-62 Coppa Italia | – | 1 | 0 | 0 | 1 | 0 | 1 | 0 | 0 | 0 | 0 | 0 | 0 | 1 | 0 | 0 | 1 | 0 | 1 | -1 |
| 1961-62 Inter-Cities Fairs Cup | – | 1 | 0 | 1 | 0 | 0 | 0 | 1 | 0 | 0 | 1 | 0 | 2 | 2 | 0 | 1 | 1 | 0 | 2 | -2 |
| 1961-62 Coppa dell'Amicizia | – | 3 | 2 | 1 | 0 | 9 | 4 | 3 | 2 | 0 | 1 | 11 | 6 | 6 | 4 | 1 | 1 | 20 | 10 | +10 |
| Total | – | 22 | 16 | 3 | 3 | 60 | 23 | 21 | 12 | 4 | 5 | 43 | 26 | 43 | 28 | 7 | 8 | 103 | 49 | +54 |

=== Players statistics ===
==== Appearances ====
- 36. (Italy) Cesare Maldini
- 35. (Brazil) José Altafini
- 34. (Italy) Giovanni Trapattoni
- 33. (Italy) Sandro Salvadore
- 32. (Italy) Mario David
- 31. (Italy) Giorgio Ghezzi
- 30. (Italy) Gianni Rivera
- 29. (Italy) Paolo Barison
- 29. (Italy) Luigi Radice
- 24. (Italy) Gino Pivatelli
- 23. (Italy) Ambrogio Pelagalli
- 22. (Brazil) Dino Sani
- 20. (Italy) Giancarlo Danova
- 17. (Italy) Oliviero Conti
- 16. (Italy) Francesco Zagatti
- 13. (England) Jimmy Greaves
- 12. (Italy) Mario Liberalato
- 12. (Italy) Mario Trebbi
- 7. (Italy) Giovanni Lodetti
- 6. (Italy) Luciano Alfieri
- 6. (Italy) Antonio Pasinato
- 5. (Uruguay) Alcides Ghiggia
- 4. (Italy) Orlando Rozzoni
- 4. (Italy) Sergio Tenente
- 2. (Italy) Emanuele Del Vecchio
- 1. (Italy) Bruno Beretti
- 1. (Italy) Paolo Ferrario

==== Goal scorers ====
- 22. (Italy) José Altafini
- 9. (Italy) Paolo Barison
- 6. (Italy) Oliviero Conti
- 8. (Italy) Giancarlo Danova
- 3. (Italy) Mario David
- 2. (Italy) Emanuele Del Vecchio
- 8. (England) Jimmy Greaves
- 3. (Italy) Giovanni Lodetti
- 1. (Italy) Cesare Maldini
- 1. (Italy) Ambrogio Pelagalli
- 9. (Italy) Gino Pivatelli
- 1. (Italy) Luigi Radice
- 10. (Italy) Gianni Rivera
- 4. (Italy) Orlando Rozzoni
- 8. (Brazil) Dino Sani
- 1. (Italy) Francesco Zagatti
