= 1960–61 AC Milan season =

Milan Associazione Calcio
1960–61 season
- President: Andrea Rizzoli
- Manager: Paolo Todeschini, then Nereo Rocco
- Stadium: San Siro
- Serie A: 2nd
- Coppa Italia: Round of 16
- Coppa dell'Amicizia: Winners
- Top goalscorer: League: José Altafini (22); All: José Altafini (26)
- Average home league attendance: 30,266
Home colours	Away colours

During the 1960–61 season Associazione Calcio Milan competed in Serie A, Coppa Italia and Coppa dell'Amicizia.

== Summary ==
The transfer market of the summer of 1960 led to a revolution: the club purchased the sixteen-year-old Gianni Rivera from Alessandria; from that season on, the young talent would have tied his career solely to Milan. Among the other signings were those of Santiago Vernazza, Mario David and Paolo Barison. After six season with the Rossoneri, Juan Alberto Schiaffino left the club, followed by Grillo, Gastone Bean and Giancarlo Danova.

Milan, led by Paolo Todeschini (former player with the club in the 1940s) and Giuseppe Viani (as technical director), finished the Serie A season in second place behind champion Juventus, despite the victory over the Bianconeri in both league matches and 22 goals from José Altafini. With 4 goals, the Brazilian became top scorer in the 1960-61 Coppa Italia which ended, for the Devils, in the round of 16. Milan won the Coppa dell'Amicizia, as part of the Italian team, against a selection of French clubs.

At the end of the season, captain Nils Liedholm ended his career as a footballer to begin the one as coach. The following year, the Swede will sit as an assistant on the Milan bench. The captaincy passed to Francesco Zagatti who will hand it over after a few months to Cesare Maldini.

== Squad ==
Note: Flags indicate national team as defined under FIFA eligibility rules; some limited exceptions apply. Players may hold more than one non-FIFA nationality.

Pos.	Nation	Player
GK	ITA	Luciano Alfieri
GK	ITA	Giorgio Ghezzi
DF	ITA	Cesare Maldini
DF	ITA	Gilberto Noletti
DF	ITA	Luigi Radice
DF	ITA	Sandro Salvadore
DF	ITA	Giovanni Trapattoni
DF	ITA	Mario Trebbi
DF	ITA	Francesco Zagatti (Vice-captain)
MF	ITA	Mario David

Pos.	Nation	Player
DF	ITA	Pierluigi Ronzon
MF	SWE	Nils Liedholm (Captain)
MF	ITA	Gianni Rivera
FW	BRA	José Altafini
FW	ITA	Paolo Barison
FW	ITA	Giovanni Fanello
FW	ITA	Carlo Galli
FW	ITA	Mario Maraschi
FW	ARG	Santiago Vernazza

=== Transfers ===
In
Pos.	Name	from	Type
FW	Paolo Barison	Genoa	-
MF	Mario David	Roma	-
FW	Giovanni Fanello	Catanzaro	-
FW	Mario Maraschi	Pro Vercelli	-
DF	Luigi Radice	Padova	-
MF	Gianni Rivera	Alessandria	-
DF	Pierluigi Ronzon	Atalanta	-
MF	Santiago Vernazza	Palermo	-

Out
Pos.	Name	To	Type
FW	Giancarlo Bacci	Padova	-
FW	Gastone Bean	Genoa	-
FW	Sergio Bettini	Alessandria	-
FW	Mario Bresolin	Genoa	-
FW	Giancarlo Danova	Torino	-
MF	Benedetto De Angelis	Mantova	-
GK	Bruno Ducati	Lecco	-
FW	Paolo Ferrario	Lazio	-
FW	Giorgio Fogar	Brescia	-
DF	Alfio Fontana	Roma	-
GK	Giancarlo Gallesi	Genoa	-
MF	Ernesto Grillo	Boca Juniors	-
DF	Vincenzo Occhetta	Genoa	-
MF	Ambrogio Pelagalli	Atalanta	-
FW	Cesare Reina	Triestina	-
MF	Juan Alberto Schiaffino	Roma	-

== Competitions ==
=== Serie A ===
==== League table ====
Pos	Team	Pld	W	D	L	GF	GA	GD	Pts	Qualification or relegation
1	Juventus (C)	34	22	5	7	80	42	+38	49	Qualified for the European Cup
2	Milan	34	18	9	7	65	39	+26	45	Invited for the Inter-Cities Fairs Cup
3	Internazionale	34	18	8	8	73	39	+34	44	Invited for the Inter-Cities Fairs Cup
4	Sampdoria	34	17	7	10	54	51	+3	41	
5	Roma (Note: Roma qualified as holders.)	34	16	7	11	58	46	+12	39	Invited for the Inter-Cities Fairs Cup

Source: Panini
(C) Champions

==== Matches ====
25 September 1960 1	Milan	3–0	Catania	Milan
	Altafini 8'; Barison 12'; Vernazza 61'			Stadium: Stadio San Siro; Attendance: 25,000; Referee: Samani

2 October 1960 2	Padova	4–1	Milan	Padova
	Milani 19', 81'; Tortul 70'; Salvadore 74' (o.g.)		76' (o.g.) Blason	Stadium: Stadio Silvio Appiani; Attendance: 20,000; Referee: Lo Bello

9 October 1960 3	Milan	5–1	Bologna	Milan
	Altafini 13', 72'; Vernazza 50', 57'; Liedholm 53' (pen.)		44' Perani	Stadium: Stadio San Siro; Attendance: 27,000; Referee: Annoscia

16 October 1960 4	Sampdoria	2–2	Milan	Genoa
	Skoglund 16'; Ocwirk 43'		40' Barison; 64' Altafini	Stadium: Stadio Luigi Ferraris; Attendance: 40,000; Referee: De Marchi

23 October 1960 5	Milan	0–0	Atalanta	Milan
				Stadium: Stadio San Siro; Attendance: 18,000; Referee: Francescon

6 November 1960 6	Juventus	3–4	Milan	Turin
	Sivori 57'; Charles 67'; Mora 83'		1', 51' Altafini; 8' Vernazza; 58' Rivera	Stadium: Stadio Comunale; Attendance: 61,500; Referee: Jonni

13 November 1960 7	Milan	3–1	Udinese	Milan
	Vernazza 17'; Rivera 29', 82'		65' Bettini	Stadium: Stadio San Siro; Attendance: 30,000; Referee: Gambarotta

20 November 1960 8	Milan	0–1	Inter Milan	Milan
			44' Picchi	Stadium: Stadio San Siro; Attendance: 85,930; Referee: Adami

27 November 1960 9	Napoli	1–2	Milan	Naples
	Tacchi 89'		23' Vernazza; 27' Altafini	Stadium: Stadio San Paolo; Attendance: 70,000; Referee: Bonetto

4 December 1960 10	Milan	2–0	Torino	Milan
	Rivera 32'; Altafini 73'			Stadium: Stadio San Siro; Attendance: 25,444; Referee: Di Tonno

18 December 1960 11	Roma	2–2	Milan	Rome
	Schiaffino 23'; Fontana 25'		10' Vernazza; 27' Altafini	Stadium: Stadio Olimpico; Attendance: 75,000; Referee: Lo Bello

25 December 1960 12	Bari	0–0	Milan	Bari
				Stadium: Stadio della Vittoria; Attendance: 18,000; Referee: Rigato

1 January 1961 13	Milan	4–1	Fiorentina	Milan
	Altafini 6', 51'; Barison 61', 64'		78' Petris	Stadium: Stadio San Siro; Attendance: 15,000; Referee: Jonni

8 January 1961 14	Milan	5–1	Lazio	Milan
	Vernazza 37', 63'; Rivera 41'; David 66'; Maraschi 83'		75' (pen.) Prini	Stadium: Stadio San Siro; Attendance: 25,116; Referee: Marchese

15 January 1961 15	Lecco	2–2	Milan	Lecco
	Gotti 48' (pen.), 88'		19' Vernazza; 36' Altafini	Stadium: Stadio Mario Rigamonti; Attendance: 15,000; Referee: Adami

22 January 1961 16	Milan	4–0	SPAL	Milan
	Altafini 29'; Galli 52', 68'; Vernazza 87'			Stadium: Stadio San Siro; Attendance: 15,000; Referee: Francescon

29 January 1961 17	Lanerossi Vicenza	1–0	Milan	Vicenza
	Pinti 84'			Stadium: Stadio Romeo Menti; Attendance: 17,000; Referee: Jonni

5 February 1961 18	Catania	4–3	Milan	Catania
	Prenna 34'; Castellazzi 40'; Calvanese 51'; Morelli 87'		50' Maraschi; 81' (pen.) Liedholm; 89' Galli	Stadium: Stadio Cibali; Attendance: 30,000; Referee: Rigato

12 February 1961 19	Milan	3–0	Padova	Milan
	Altafini 8', 51'; Galli 89'			Stadium: Stadio San Siro; Attendance: 22,000; Referee: Babini

19 February 1961 20	Bologna	0–2	Milan	Bologna
			42', 72' Altafini	Stadium: Stadio Renato Dall'Ara; Attendance: 29,000; Referee: Gambarotta

26 February 1961 21	Milan	3–1	Sampdoria	Milan
	Salvadore 56'; Vernazza 57'; Altafini 68'		63' Brighenti	Stadium: Stadio San Siro; Attendance: 23,000; Referee: Annoscia

5 March 1961 22	Atalanta	2–0	Milan	Bergamo
	Longoni 30'; Maschio 85' (pen.)			Stadium: Stadio Comunale; Attendance: 26,500; Referee: De Marchi

12 March 1961 23	Milan	3–1	Juventus	Milan
	Colombo 15' (o.g.); Altafini 57'; Rivera 87'		10' Sivori	Stadium: Stadio San Siro; Attendance: 86,303; Referee: Rigato

19 March 1961 24	Udinese	0–0	Milan	Udine
				Stadium: Stadio Moretti; Attendance: 15,000; Referee: Bonetto

26 March 1961 25	Inter Milan	1–2	Milan	Milan
	Lindskog 52' (pen.)		1' Altafini; 19' Liedholm	Stadium: Stadio San Siro; Attendance: 87,500; Referee: Rigato

2 April 1961 26	Milan	2–1	Napoli	Milan
	Vernazza 17'; David 32' (pen.)		68' (o.g.) Trapattoni	Stadium: Stadio San Siro; Attendance: 39,577; Referee: Lo Bello

9 April 1961 27	Torino	1–1	Milan	Turin
	Locatelli 31' (pen.)		13' Altafini	Stadium: Stadio Filadelfia; Attendance: 27,000; Referee: Jonni

16 April 1961 28	Milan	2–1	Roma	Milan
	Trapattoni 48'; Altafini 85'		45' (pen.) Lojacono	Stadium: Stadio San Siro; Attendance: 45,000; Referee: De Marchi

30 April 1961 29	Milan	1–3	Bari	Milan
	Seghedoni 58' (o.g.)		24' Cicogna; 37' Virgili; 72' Catalano	Stadium: Stadio San Siro; Attendance: 33,000; Referee: Lo Bello

7 May 1961 30	Fiorentina	2–0	Milan	Florence
	Robotti 59'; Da Costa 70'			Stadium: Stadio Comunale; Attendance: 29,500; Referee: Gambarotta

14 May 1961 31	Lazio	0–1	Milan	Rome
			75' Vernazza	Stadium: Stadio Olimpico; Attendance: 25,000; Referee: Di Tonno

21 May 1961 32	Milan	1–1	Lecco	Milan
	Ronzon 50'		75' Gilardoni	Stadium: Stadio San Siro; Attendance: 20,000; Referee: Lo Bello

30 May 1961 33	SPAL	1–2	Milan	Ferrara
	Massei 58' (pen.)		42' Ronzon; 54' Barison	Stadium: Stadio Comunale; Attendance: 12,000; Referee: Bonetto

4 June 1961 34	Milan	0–0	Lanerossi Vicenza	Milan
				Stadium: Stadio San Siro; Attendance: 17,000; Referee: Annoscia

=== Coppa Italia ===
==== Second round ====
18 September 1960 1	Alessandria	3–5	Milan	Alessandria
	Vanara 14'; Vitali 27'; Fanello 51'		5', 18', 65' Altafini; 30' Galli; 50' Vernazza	Stadium: Stadio Giuseppe Moccagatta; Attendance: 12,000; Referee: Leita

==== Round of 16 ====
1 March 1961 1	Torino	2–1	Milan	Turin
	Mazzero 33'; Ferrario 89'		63' Altafini	Stadium: Stadio Filadelfia; Attendance: 13,000; Referee: Roversi

=== Coppa dell'Amicizia ===
11 June 1961 1	Milan	0–0	Nîmes	Milan
				Stadium: Stadio San Siro; Attendance: 8,000; Referee: De Marchi

18 June 1961 2	Nîmes	2–0	Milan	Nîmes
	Brahann 62'; Djbaili 78'			Stadium: Stade des Costières; Attendance: 5,000; Referee: Kitabdjan

== Statistics ==
=== Squad statistics ===
Competition	Points	Home						Away						Total						GD
Competition	Points	G	W	D	L	Gs	Ga	G	W	D	L	Gs	Ga	G	W	D	L	Gs	Ga	GD
1960-61 Serie A	45	17	12	3	2	41	13	17	6	6	5	24	26	34	18	9	7	65	39	+26
1960-61 Coppa Italia	–	0	0	0	0	0	0	2	1	0	1	6	5	2	1	0	1	6	5	+1
1960-61 Coppa dell'Amicizia	–	1	0	1	0	0	0	1	0	0	1	0	2	2	0	1	1	0	2	-2
Total	–	18	12	4	2	41	13	20	7	6	7	30	33	38	19	10	9	71	46	+25

=== Players statistics ===
No.	Pos	Nat	Player	Total		Serie A		Coppa Italia		Coppa dell'Amicizia	
No.	Pos	Nat	Player	Apps	Goals	Apps	Goals	Apps	Goals	Apps	Goals
	GK	(Italy) ITA	Giorgio Ghezzi	35	-42	32	-37	1	-3	2	-2
	DF	(Italy) ITA	Cesare Maldini	34	0	30	0	2	0	2	0
	DF	(Italy) ITA	Gilberto Noletti	2	0	2	0	0	0	0	0
	GK	(Italy) ITA	Luciano Alfieri	4	-4	2	-2	1	-2	1	0
	FW	(Italy) ITA	Paolo Barison	13	5	11	5	1	0	1	0
	FW	(Argentina) ARG	Santiago Vernazza	33	15	29	14	2	1	2	0
	MF	(Sweden) SWE	Nils Liedholm	28	3	25	3	1	0	2	0
	DF	(Italy) ITA	Francesco Zagatti	7	0	5	0	2	0	0	0
	FW	(Italy) ITA	Giovanni Fanello	2	0	0	0	0	0	2	0
	FW	(Brazil) BRA	José Altafini	38	26	34	22	2	4	2	0
	FW	(Italy) ITA	Carlo Galli	23	5	20	4	2	1	1	0
	FW	(Italy) ITA	Mario Maraschi	15	2	13	2	1	0	1	0
	MF	(Italy) ITA	Gianni Rivera	33	6	30	6	1	0	2	0
	DF	(Italy) ITA	Mario Trebbi	32	0	30	0	1	0	1	0
	DF	(Italy) ITA	Pierluigi Ronzon	23	2	20	2	1	0	2	0
	MF	(Italy) ITA	Mario David	28	2	25	2	1	0	2	0
	DF	(Italy) ITA	Sandro Salvadore	37	1	34	1	2	0	1	0
	MF	(Italy) ITA	Giovanni Trapattoni	32	1	30	1	1	0	1	0

== See also ==
- AC Milan

== Bibliography ==
- Almanacco illustrato del Milan, ed: 2, March 2005. Panini.
- Enrico Tosi. La storia del Milan, May 2005. Italia/Italy cid Tosi.
- Milan. Sempre con te, December 2009. Mondadori. 2009. ISBN 978-88-04-59118-4.
