= 1958–59 AC Milan season =

Associazione Calcio Milan
1958–59 season
- Chairman: Andrea Rizzoli
- Manager: Luigi Bonizzoni
- Stadium: San Siro
- Serie A: 1st (in European Cup)
- Coppa Italia: Eightfinals
- Top goalscorer: League: Altafini (28); All: Altafini (32)
- Average home league attendance: 34,215
Home colours	Away colours

During 1958–59 season Milan competed in Serie A and Coppa Italia.

== Summary ==
In the 1958-1959 season the managerial lead of the club was entrusted to Luigi Bonizzoni, while Gipo Viani remained at Milan as technical director. The latter would cover this role until the 1964-1965 season. Cucchiaroni left, and striker José Altafini was signed from Palmeiras and immediately became a protagonist in his first season, scoring 28 goals, while Sandro Salvadore joined from the youth team. The other reinforcement for the Rossoneri was midfielder Vincenzo Occhetta.

In the league, the club immediately took the lead, but on the sixth matchday the defeat against Lanerossi Vicenza cost them the first place, which they lost to Fiorentina. Two weeks later, on the 16th of November, Milan conquered the field of the defending champions Juventus in the ninetieth minute at the end of a match that ended with a score of 4-5, and caught the Viola at the top of the standings. The two teams thus started a duel that lasted until the end of the first half of the season, which Milan finished at the top of the table.

The second half of the season continued along the lines of the first, with Milan and Fiorentina competing for first place: with the victory in Florence, the Rossoneri overtook the Viola, but the home draw against Spal, a week later, nullified everything. One week later, the turning point occurred: on the 26th of April, Spal beat Fiorentina, while Milan draw 3-3 against bottom-of-the-table Torino. During the match a fight breaks out which sent two Milan players to the infirmary, with the sports judge not awarding the victory to Milan who still managed to maintain the one point lead until the end.

By beating Udinese 7-0, Milan became Italian Champions with a round to spare, trailing Fiorentina by three points: it was the seventh scudetto in their history.

In the Coppa Italia, Milan was eliminated for the second consecutive year by Bologna, this time in the round of 16.

== Squad ==
Note: Flags indicate national team as defined under FIFA eligibility rules; some limited exceptions apply. Players may hold more than one non-FIFA nationality.

Pos.	Nation	Player
GK	ITA	Lorenzo Buffon (vice-captain)
GK	ITA	Bruno Ducati
GK	ITA	Narciso Soldan
DF	ITA	Cesare Maldini
DF	ITA	Luigi Radice
DF	ITA	Sandro Salvadore
DF	ITA	Mario Trebbi
DF	ITA	Francesco Zagatti
MF	ITA	Giancarlo Bacci
MF	ITA	Eros Beraldo
MF	ITA	Alfio Fontana
MF	ARG	Ernesto Grillo

Pos.	Nation	Player
MF	SWE	Nils Liedholm (Captain)
MF	ITA	Giancarlo Migliavacca
MF	ITA	Vincenzo Occhetta
MF	ITA	Cesare Reina
MF	URU	Juan Alberto Schiaffino
FW	BRA	José Altafini
FW	ITA	Gastone Bean
FW	ITA	Giancarlo Danova
FW	ITA	Paolo Ferrario
FW	ITA	Carlo Galli
FW	ITA	Vittorino Mantovani

== Transfers ==
In
Pos.	Name	from	Type
FW	José Altafini	Palmeiras	–
MF	Vittorino Mantovani	Treviso	–
DF	Vincenzo Occhetta	Marzotto Valdagno	–

Out
Pos.	Name	to	Type
FW	Dario Baruffi	Hellas Verona	–
DF	Giancarlo Beltrami	Hellas Verona	–
DF	Mario Bergamaschi	Sampdoria	–
MF	Per Bredesen	Bari	–
DF	Roberto Corradi	Treviso	–
FW	Ernesto Cucchiaroni	Sampdoria	–
DF	Eros Fassetta	Hellas Verona	–
DF	Franco Landri	Forlì	–
FW	Luciano Magistrelli	Treviso	–
FW	Amos Mariani	Padova Calcio	–
FW	Pietro Testa	Forlì	–
MF	Luigi Zannier	Padova Calcio	–

== Competitions ==
=== Serie A ===
==== League table ====
Pos	Team	Pld	W	D	L	GF	GA	GD	Pts	Qualification or relegation
1	Milan (C)	34	20	12	2	84	32	+52	52	Qualification to European Cup
2	Fiorentina	34	20	9	5	95	35	+60	49	
3	Internazionale	34	20	6	8	77	41	+36	46	
4	Juventus	34	16	10	8	74	51	+23	42	
5	Sampdoria	34	15	8	11	50	44	+6	38	

Source: Panini
(C) Champions

==== Matches ====
21 September 1958 1	Milan	2–0	Triestina	Milan
	Galli 36' (pen.), 89'	Report		Stadium: San Siro; Attendance: 33,000; Referee: Carlo Marangio

28 September 1958 2	Napoli	0–1	Milan	Naples
		Report	14' Danova	Stadium: Vomero; Attendance: 40,000; Referee: Francesco Liverani

5 October 1958 3	Milan	4–2	Bari	Milan
	Altafini 49'; Mupo 51' (o.g.); Danova 61', 87'	Report	39' Mazzoni; 58' Conti	Stadium: San Siro; Attendance: 28,000; Referee: Gennaro Marchese

12 October 1958 4	Sampdoria	0–0	Milan	Genoa
		Report		Stadium: Marassi; Attendance: 30,000; Referee: Iginio Rigato

19 October 1958 5	Milan	5–1	Alessandria	Milan
	Schiaffino 1'; Danova 15', 21'; Altafini 20', 88'	Report	69' Oldani	Stadium: San Siro; Attendance: 25,000; Referee: Francesco De Robbio

26 October 1958 6	Lanerossi Vicenza	2–0	Milan	Vicenza
	Cappellaro 28'; Menti 30'	Report		Stadium: Stadio Romeo Menti; Attendance: 15,000; Referee: Pietro Bonetto

2 November 1958 7	Milan	1–1	Inter Milan	Milan
	Altafini 9'	Report	67' Angelillo	Stadium: San Siro; Attendance: 85,000; Referee: Gennaro Marchese

16 November 1958 8	Juventus	4–5	Milan	Turin
	Boniperti 39'; Corradi 62'; Charles 73'; Sívori 81'	Report	24', 90' Grillo; 30' Galli; 33', 66' Altafini	Stadium: Comunale; Attendance: 60,000; Referee: Cesare Jonni

23 November 1958 9	Roma	1–1	Milan	Rome
	Selmosson 68'	Report	63' Altafini	Stadium: Comunale; Attendance: 45,000; Referee: Gennaro Marchese

30 November 1958 10	Milan	2–0	Fiorentina	Milan
	Danova 47'; Altafini 82'	Report		Stadium: San Siro; Attendance: 50,000; Referee: Lo Bello

7 December 1958 11	SPAL	1–1	Milan	Ferrara
	Broccini 10'	Report	57' Altafini	Stadium: Comunale; Attendance: 14,000; Referee: Iginio Rigato

21 December 1958 12	Milan	5–1	Torino	Milan
	Altafini 5', 67', 74'; Cancian 63' (o.g.); Occhetta 88'	Report	83' Virgili	Stadium: San Siro; Attendance: 16,000; Referee: De Marchi

28 December 1958 13	Milan	5–0	Lazio	Milan
	Altafini 16', 56'; Danova 27', 74'; Grillo 90'	Report		Stadium: San Siro; Attendance: 40000; Referee: Pietro Bonetto

4 January 1959 14	Genoa	0–2	Milan	Genoa
		Report	57' Bacci; 63' Altafini	Stadium: Marassi; Attendance: 40,000; Referee: Lo Bello

11 January 1959 15	Milan	4–1	Padova	Milan
	Galli 20', 25', 65'; Danova 74'	Report	57' Moro	Stadium: San Siro; Attendance: 30,000; Referee: Fiorenzo Annoscia

18 January 1959 16	Udinese	2–2	Milan	Udine
	Bettini 36'; Sentimenti V 82'	Report	35' Bacci; 57' Grillo	Stadium: Stadio Moretti; Attendance: 20,000; Referee: Gennaro Marchese

25 January 1959 17	Milan	4–3	Bologna	Milan
	Schiaffino 19'; Grillo 46'; Altafini 49'; Danova 72'	Report	16' Fogli; 27' Pascutti; 56' Pivatelli	Stadium: San Siro; Attendance: 35,000; Referee: Pietro Bonetto

1 February 1959 18	Triestina	2–2	Milan	Trieste
	Tortul 11'; Maldini 25' (o.g.)	Report	16' Danova; 83' Grillo	Stadium: Comunale; Attendance: 12,000; Referee: Lo Bello

8 February 1959 19	Milan	6–1	Napoli	Milan
	Grillo 9', 50'; Altafini 12', 19'; Bean 52'; Danova 65'	Report	58' (o.g.) Liedholm	Stadium: San Siro; Attendance: 44,000; Referee: Orlandini

15 February 1959 20	Bari	0–2	Milan	Bari
		Report	35' Altafini; 44' Galli	Stadium: San Siro; Attendance: 45,000; Referee: Jonni

22 February 1959 21	Milan	4–1	Sampdoria	Milan
	Bacci 20', 71', 81'; Altafini 69'	Report	31' Milani	Stadium: San Siro; Attendance: 48,000; Referee: Giuseppe Adami

8 March 1959 22	Alessandria	1–2	Milan	Alessandria
	Tacchi 12'	Report	52', 74' Altafini	Stadium: Stadio Giuseppe Moccagatta; Attendance: 22,000; Referee: Iginio Rigato

15 March 1959 23	Milan	0–0	Lanerossi Vicenza	Milan
		Report		Stadium: San Siro; Attendance: 23,000; Referee: Carlo Gambarotta

22 March 1959 24	Inter Milan	1–0	Milan	Milan
	Firmani 36'	Report		Stadium: San Siro; Attendance: 70,000; Referee: Concetto Lo Bello

29 March 1959 25	Milan	1–1	Juventus	Milan
	Altafini 47'	Report	73' Boniperti	Stadium: San Siro; Attendance: 68,000; Referee: Cesare Jonni

5 April 1959 26	Milan	4–1	Roma	Milan
	Carlo Galli 12'; Altafini 30', 42'; Grillo 44'	Report	86' (pen.) Zaglio	Stadium: San Siro; Attendance: 30,000; Referee: Fiorenzo Annoscia

12 April 1959 27	Fiorentina	1–3	Milan	Florence
	Hamrin 41'	Report	9' (o.g.) Robotti; 17' Altafini; 80' Danova	Stadium: Comunale; Attendance: 55,000; Referee: Orlandini

19 April 1959 28	Milan	0–0	SPAL	Milan
		Report		Stadium: San Siro; Attendance: 25,000; Referee: Cesare Jonni

26 April 1959 29	Torino	3–3	Milan	Turin
	Crippa 10'; Marchi 40'; Ganzer 92'	Report	4' (o.g.) Armano; 51' (o.g.) Liedholm; 78' Altafini	Stadium: Comunale; Attendance: 28,000; Referee: (France) Groppi

17 May 1959 30	Lazio	0–0	Milan	Turin
		Report		Stadium: Stadio Olimpico; Attendance: 35,000; Referee: Pietro Bonetto

24 May 1959 31	Milan	4–0	Genoa	Milan
	Occhetta 26'; Bean 65'; Altafini 67'; Danova 86'	Report		Stadium: San Siro; Attendance: 22,000; Referee: Annoscia

28 May 1959 32	Padova	0–1	Milan	Padua
		Report	54' (o.g.) Moro	Stadium: Stadio Appiani; Attendance: 20,000; Referee: Antonio Moriconi

2 June 1959 33	Milan	7–0	Udinese	Milan
	Bean 5', 73'; Galli 19', 20', 61'; Danova 36'; Fontana 64'	Report		Stadium: San Siro; Attendance: 20,000; Referee: Concetto Lo Bello

7 June 1959 34	Bologna	1–1	Milan	Bologna
	Bonafin 79'	Report	46' Danova	Stadium: Comunale; Attendance: 8,500; Referee: Orlandini

=== Coppa Italia ===
Italian Football Federation re-lived the knock-out tournament after fifteen years with two editions in season 1958–59. The first edition was played before the kick-off of Serie A tournament due to 1960 European Nations' Cup qualifying which starting on 28 September 1958. The second edition was played during the Serie A championship.

==== 1958 Coppa Italia ====
===== Quarterfinals =====
6 September 1958	Milan	2–4	Bologna	Milan
	Altafini 40'; Danova 56'		24' Vukas; 48', 81' Perani; 67' Fogli	Stadium: San Siro; Attendance: 25,000; Referee: Pietro Bonetto

===== Semifinals 5º/8º place =====
13 September 1958	Milan	8–1	Padova	Milan
	Danova 5', 41'; Grillo 19'; Altafini 32', 38', 61'; Occhetta 43'; Galli 56'		53' Luosi	Stadium: San Siro; Attendance: 5,000; Referee: Piero Angelini

===== Final 5º/6º place =====
4 November 1958	Milan	0–1	Sampdoria	Milan
		Report	55' Mora	Stadium: San Siro; Attendance: 2,000; Referee: Pietro De Magistris

==== 1958–59 Coppa Italia ====
===== Eightfinals =====
10 May 1959	Bologna	3–2	Milan	Bologna
	Pascutti 32'; Bonafin 62'; Maschio 89'	Report	22' (pen.) Liedholm; 72' Occhetta	Stadium: Comunale; Attendance: 8,000; Referee: Gennaro Marchese

=== Friendship Cup ===
14 June 1959	Nice	3–3	Milan	Nice
	Foix 30'; Faivre 70', 75'	Report	3', 89' Danova; 19' Ferrario	Stadium: Stade Municipal du Ray; Attendance: 10,000; Referee: Pietro Bonetto

== Statistics ==
Competition	Points	Home						Away						Total						DR
Competition	Points	G	W	D	L	Gs	Ga	G	W	D	L	Gs	Ga	G	W	D	L	Gs	Ga	DR
1958–59 Serie A	52	17	13	4	0	58	13	17	7	8	2	26	19	34	20	8	2	84	32	+52
1958 Coppa Italia1958–59 Coppa Italia	Eightfinals	3	1	0	2	10	6	1	0	0	1	2	3	4	1	0	3	12	9	+3
1959 Friendship Cup	–	–	–	–	–	–	–	1	0	1	0	3	3	1	0	1	0	3	3	0
Total	–	20	14	4	2	68	19	19	7	9	3	31	25	39	21	9	5	99	44	+55

=== Players statistics ===
==== Appearances ====
- 38. (Italy) Alfio Fontana
- 38. (Italy) Cesare Maldini
- 37. (Brazil) José Altafini
- 36. (Italy) Francesco Zagatti
- 35. (Italy) Giancarlo Danova
- 34. (Italy) Carlo Galli
- 32. (Sweden) Nils Liedholm
- 30. (Italy) Ernesto Grillo
- 29. (Italy) Vincenzo Occhetta
- 29. (Uruguay) Juan Alberto Schiaffino
- 26. (Italy) Lorenzo Buffon
- 20. (Italy) Gastone Bean
- 12. (Italy) Giancarlo Bacci
- 12. (Italy) Narciso Soldan
- 5. (Italy) Luigi Radice
- 5. (Italy) Sandro Salvadore
- 4. (Italy) Eros Beraldo
- 3. (Italy) Bruno Ducati
- 3. (Italy) Paolo Ferrario
- 3. (Italy) Giancarlo Migliavacca
- 2. (Italy) Mario Trebbi
- 1. (Italy) Vittorino Mantovani
- 1. (Italy) Cesare Reina

==== Goalscorers ====
- 32. (Brazil) José Altafini
- 21. (Italy) Giancarlo Danova
- 12. (Italy) Carlo Galli
- 10. (Italy) Ernesto Grillo
- 5. (Italy) Giancarlo Bacci
- 4. (Italy) Gastone Bean
- 4. (Italy) Vincenzo Occhetta
- 2. (Sweden) Nils Liedholm
- 2. (Uruguay) Juan Alberto Schiaffino
- 1. (Italy) Paolo Ferrario
- 1. (Italy) Alfio Fontana

== See also ==
- l'Unità, 1958 and 1959.
- La Stampa, 1958 and 1959.
