= Mario David (footballer) =

Italian footballer and manager

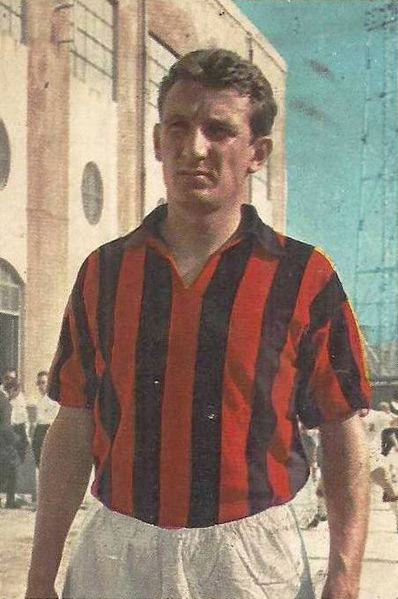

Personal information
- Date of birth: 3 January 1934
- Place of birth: Udine, Kingdom of Italy
- Date of death: 26 July 2005 (aged 71)
- Place of death: Monfalcone, Italy
- Height: 1.74 m (5 ft 8 1/2 in)
- Positions: Defender; midfielder

Senior career*
Years	Team	Apps	(Gls)
1950–1953	Livorno	26	(2)
1953–1958	L.R. Vicenza	117	(14)
1958–1960	Roma	43	(2)
1960–1965	Milan	114	(6)
1965–1966	Sampdoria	14	(0)
1966–1967	Alessandria	3	(0)
Total		317	(24)

International career
1958–1962	Italy	3	(0)

Managerial career
- 1970–1971: Anconitana
- 1971–1972: Alessandria
- 1972–1973: Casertana
- 1973–1975: Monza
- 1976–1979: Trento
- * Club domestic league appearances and goals

Mario David (Italian pronunciation: [ˈmaːrjo ˈdaːvid]; 3 January 1934 – 26 July 2005) was an Italian footballer and manager, who played as a defender or midfielder.

Throughout his career, he played for several Italian clubs, but is mainly remembered for his lengthier spells with Vicenza and Milan; he and won a Serie A title and a European Cup title with the latter club. At international level, he represented the Italy national football team at the 1962 FIFA World Cup.

== Club career ==
David was born at Udine. He played for 11 seasons in the Serie A (259 games, 20 goals). Throughout his career, he played in a defensive role from 1952 to 1966 for Italian sides Livorno, Lanerossi Vicenza, A.C. Milan and U.C. Sampdoria. He won the 1961–62 Serie A title, and European Cup final in 1963 with Milan, with the team defeating Benfica 2–1 at Wembley in the latter match.

== International career ==
At international level, David played for the Italy national football team on three occasions between 1958 and 1962, also taking part in the 1962 World Cup. He made his international debut on 23 March 1958, in a 3–2 away defeat to Austria in the 1955–1960 Central European International Cup. He is also remembered for his controversial confrontation with Leonel Sánchez against hosts Chile in the infamous "Battle of Santiago" in the first round of the 1962 FIFA World Cup on 2 June, which led to him being sent off: after being fouled by David, Sánchez initially punched him in retaliation; David kicked Sanchez in the head a few minutes later, and as a result he was sent off. Chile won the match 2–0, and Italy were eliminated in the first round of the tournament. That would be David's only appearance at the World Cup, and he would not make any further caps for Italy.

== Style of play ==
David was capable of playing either as a full-back or as a defensive midfielder, although he was also used in the mezzala role on occasion. A dynamic player, he was known for his tough-tackling style of play, man-marking ability, stamina, competitive spirit, and consistency, which allowed him to provide balance for the less dynamic but more creative and attacking-minded players in his teams. However, he was also known for his offensive qualities, and possessed good technical skills, as well as precise long-range passing and crossing ability, which made him effective on counter-attacks, and allowed him to create chances for the forwards.

== Managerial career ==
Following his retirement, David coached several Italian clubs, including Anconitana (1970–71), Alessandria (1972–73), Casertana (1973–75), Monza, and Trento (1976–79).

== Death ==
David died at Monfalcone in 2005, at the age of 71.

== Honours ==
Milan

- Serie A: 1961–62
- European Cup: 1962–63

== See also ==
- La zizanie
