= Ambrogio Pelagalli =

Italian footballer (1940–2024)

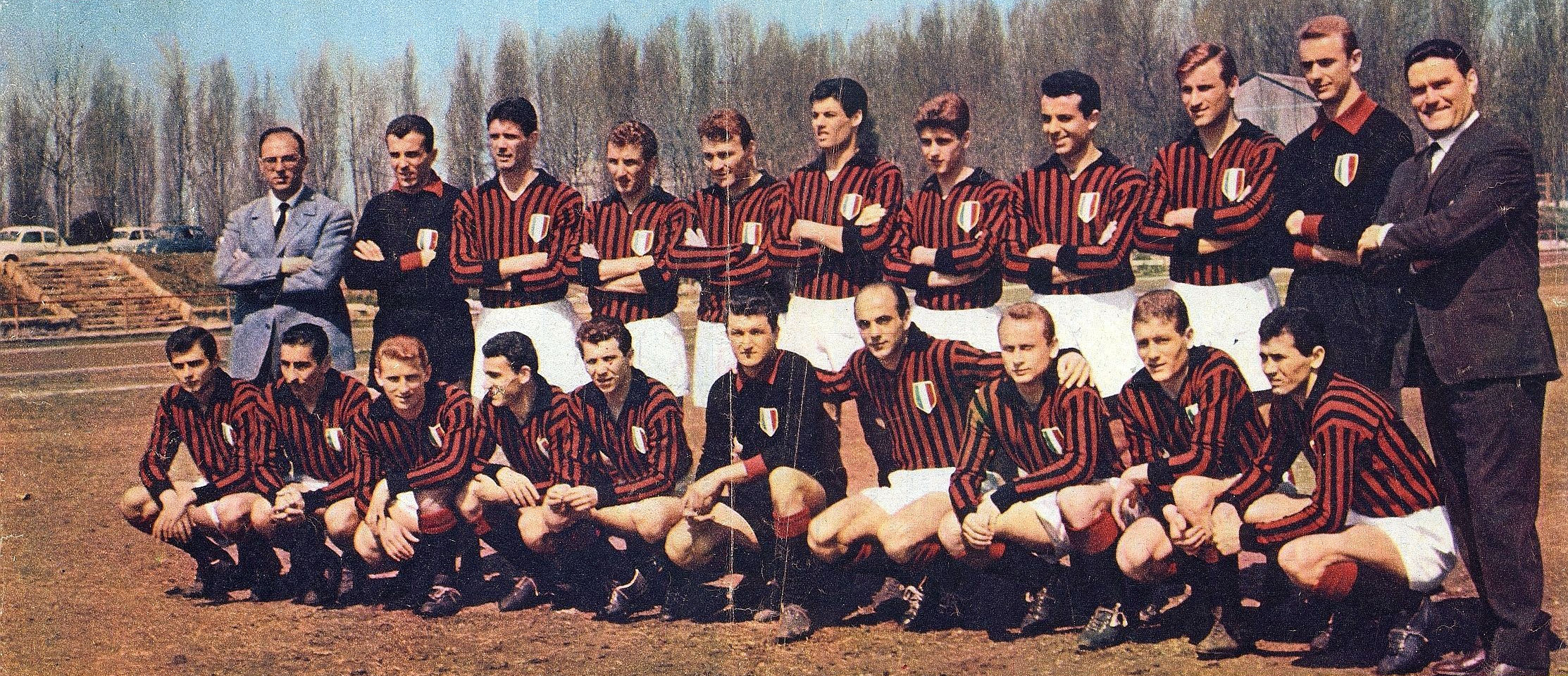
- Pelagalli (bottom row, third from right) with AC Milan in 1962.

Personal information
- Date of birth: 15 February 1940
- Place of birth: Pieve Porto Morone, Italy
- Date of death: 25 March 2024 (aged 84)
- Height: 1.72 m (5 ft 8 in)
- Positions: Defender; midfielder

Senior career*
Years	Team	Apps	(Gls)
1959–1960	Milan	1	(0)
1960–1961	Atalanta	33	(1)
1961–1966	Milan	117	(1)
1966–1967	Atalanta	31	(4)
1967–1968	Roma	27	(0)
1968–1970	Atalanta	58	(0)
1970–1973	Taranto	107	(0)
1973–1974	Piacenza	16	(0)
1974–1975	Meda		
- * Club domestic league appearances and goals

Ambrogio Pelagalli (15 February 1940 – 25 March 2024) was an Italian professional footballer who played as a defender or midfielder.

== Career ==
Pelagalli played for 10 seasons (235 games, 5 goals) in Serie A for A.C. Milan, Atalanta and Roma, and made nearly 400 appearances in the Italian professional leagues.

Pelagalli was also a member of Italy's team at the 1960 Summer Olympics, but he did not play in any matches.

== Death ==
Pelagalli died on 25 March 2024, at the age of 84.

== Honours ==
Milan

- Serie A: 1961–62
