= Paolo Barison =

Italian footballer

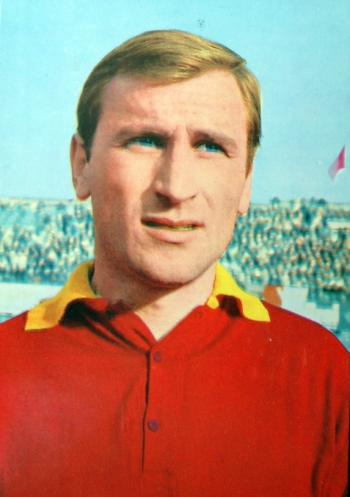

Personal information
- Date of birth: 23 June 1936
- Place of birth: Vittorio Veneto, Italy
- Date of death: 17 April 1979 (aged 42)
- Place of death: Andora, Italy
- Position: Striker

Senior career*
Years	Team	Apps	(Gls)
1954–1957	Venezia	71	(20)
1957–1960	Genoa	71	(30)
1960–1963	A.C. Milan	57	(14)
1963–1965	Sampdoria	57	(19)
1965–1967	A.S. Roma	62	(13)
1967–1970	Napoli	55	(7)
1970–1971	Ternana	31	(10)
1971–1972	Bellaria	31	(17)
1972	Toronto Metros	8	(3)
Total		443	(133)

International career
1958–1966	Italy	9	(6)

Managerial career
- 1975–1976: A.C. Milan
- * Club domestic league appearances and goals

Paolo Barison (Italian pronunciation: [ˈpaːolo bariˈzon], Venetian: [baɾiˈzoŋ]; 23 June 1936 in – 17 April 1979) was an Italian association footballer who played as a striker.

== Club career ==
During his club career, Barison played for S.S.C. Venezia, Genoa C.F.C., A.C. Milan, U.C. Sampdoria, A.S. Roma, and S.S.C. Napoli. He made his Serie A debut with Genoa on 8 September 1957, in a 4–0 away defeat against Napoli. He was a key figure in Milan winning the 1962–63 European Cup, scoring six goals during their cup run, however he was dropped for the final in favour of Gino Pivatelli.

== International career ==
At international level, Barison earned 9 caps and scored 6 goals for the Italy national football team between 1958 and 1966. He made his international debut on 28 February 1959, in a 1–1 friendly home draw against Spain, and he later took part at the 1966 FIFA World Cup in England. In the latter tournament, he assisted Sandro Mazzola's opening goal and then scored a late goal himself in the team's opening 2–0 win over Chile. Italy were eliminated in the first round following an unexpected 1–0 loss to North Korea in their final group match, in which he also appeared.

== Honours ==
Milan

- Serie A: 1961–62
- European Cup: 1962–63
