= Giorgio Ghezzi =

Italian footballer (1930–1990)

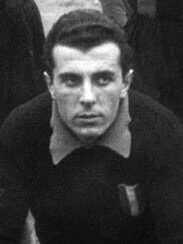

Personal information
- Date of birth: 11 July 1930
- Place of birth: Cesenatico, Italy
- Date of death: 12 December 1990 (aged 60)
- Place of death: Forlì, Italy
- Height: 1.82 m (5 ft 11 1/2 in)
- Position: Goalkeeper

Youth career
- Cesenatico

Senior career*
Years	Team	Apps	(Gls)
1947–1949	Rimini	44	(0)
1949–1951	Modena	62	(0)
1951–1958	Inter Milan	186	(0)
1958–1959	Genoa	32	(0)
1959–1965	AC Milan	123	(0)
Total		447	(0)

International career
1954–1961	Italy	6	(0)

Managerial career
- 1966–1967: Genoa
- * Club domestic league appearances and goals

Giorgio Ghezzi (Italian pronunciation: [ˈdʒordʒo ˈɡettsi; ˈɡeddzi]; 11 July 1930 – 12 December 1990), nicknamed "Kamikaze", was an Italian football manager and player who played as a goalkeeper.

== Club career ==
Born in Cesenatico, Ghezzi started his career at Rimini in 1947 and later played for Modena between 1949 and 1951. He subsequently joined Inter Milan in 1951, making his Serie A debut that season in a 3–1 home win over Legnano on 21 October. He remained at the club for 7 years, playing a total of 191 matches with the team across all competitions (Serie A, European Cup and Coppa Italia). During his time with Inter, he won 2 Serie A titles in 1953 and 1954.

At the end of the 1957–58 season, he was sold to Genoa, and then, in 1959, he returned to Milan, but to join Inter's cross-city rivals AC Milan, as a replacement for his perceived career rival Lorenzo Buffon, who had instead joined Genoa that season, and who subsequently moved to Ghezzi's former club Inter the following season. With Milan, Ghezzi won another Serie A title in 1962 and the 1962–63 European Champions Cup in 1963; in the 1963 European Cup Final, he was one of the club's star performers as Milan defeated Eusébio's Benfica 2–1 at Wembley, becoming the first Italian goalkeeper to win the European Cup. Ghezzi retired with Milan in 1965.

== International career ==
At international level, Ghezzi made six appearances for the Italy national football team between 1954 and 1961. He made his debut on 11 April 1954, in a 3–1 away win over France, and was a starting member of the Italy team that took part at the 1954 FIFA World Cup, despite competition from several other excellent Italian goalkeepers at the time, such as Leonardo Costagliola, Giovanni Viola, Giuliano Sarti, and William Negri. Later he found his opportunities in the national team more limited due to the presence of his perceived career rival Buffon.

== Style of play ==
An aggressive, courageous and spectacular goalkeeper, Ghezzi was known in particular for his athleticism, agility, reflexes and acrobatic saves, as well as his speed when rushing off his line to anticipate or challenge opposing strikers; his playing style as a sweeper keeper inspired his nickname kamikaze. Despite his shot-stopping abilities and reputation as one of the greatest Italian goalkeepers of his generation, he was also at times criticised for his mentality and consistency, and was known for letting his emotions get the better of him on occasion.

== Managerial career ==
Following his retirement as a player, Ghezzi served as manager of Genoa between 1966 and 1967.

== Personal life ==
Ghezzi dated the Italian television personality and actress Edy Campagnoli, who later went on to marry Ghezzi's perceived career rival, Buffon.

Ghezzi died in his hometown, Forlì, on 12 December 1990, at the age of 60, from a heart attack.

== Honours ==
=== Club ===
Inter

- Serie A: 1952–53, 1953–54

Milan

- Serie A: 1961–62
- European Cup: 1962–63

=== Individual ===
- A.C. Milan Hall of Fame
