= Sandro Salvadore =

Italian footballer (1939–2007)

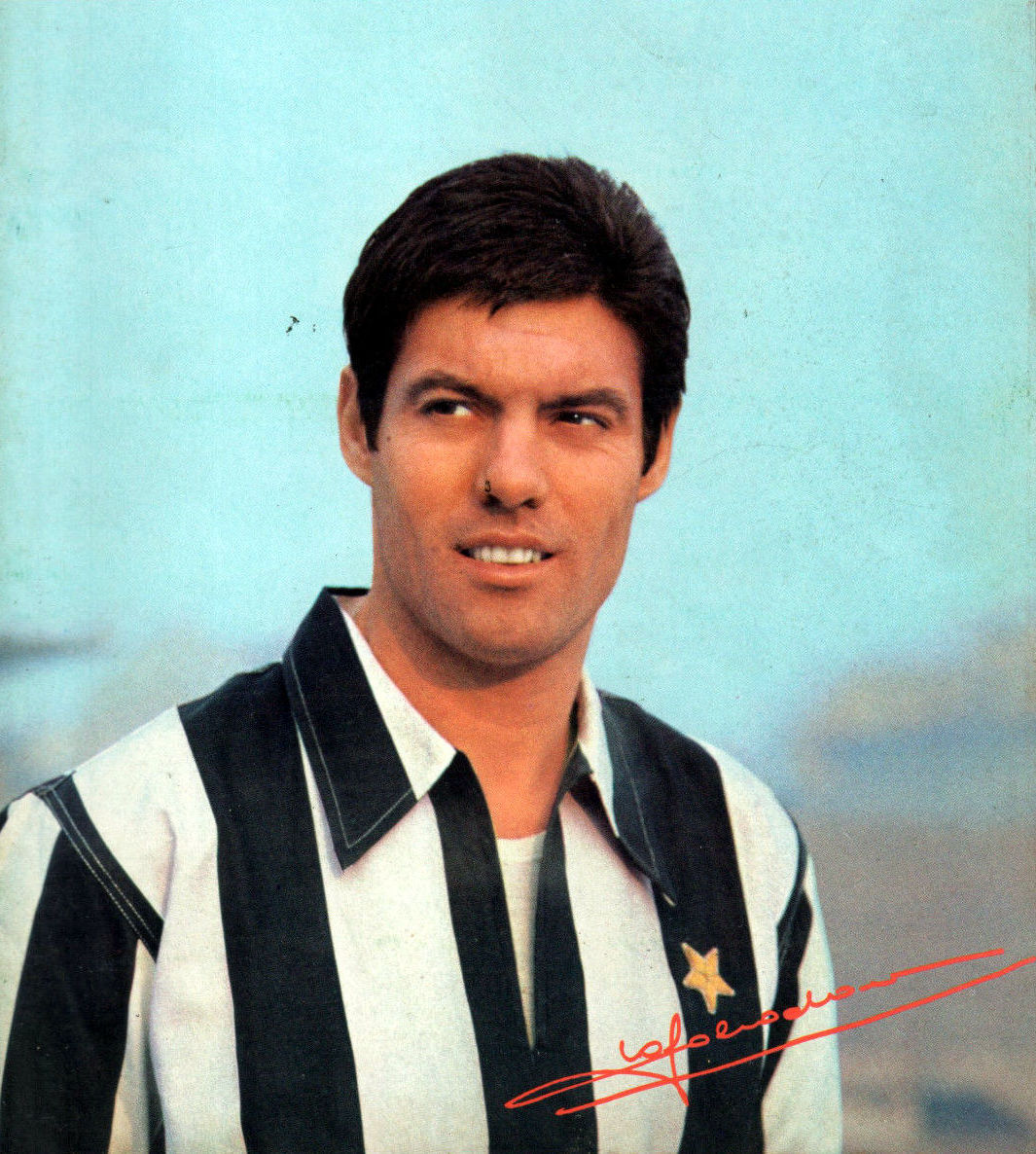
- Salvadore with Juventus in 1969

Personal information
- Full name: Sandro Salvadore
- Date of birth: 29 November 1939
- Place of birth: Milan, Italy
- Date of death: 4 January 2007 (aged 67)
- Place of death: Costigliole d'Asti, Italy
- Height: 1.81 m (5 ft 11 in)
- Positions: Libero; centre-back

Youth career
- 1955–1958: A.C. Milan

Senior career*
Years	Team	Apps	(Gls)
1958–1962	A.C. Milan	72	(1)
1962–1974	Juventus	331	(15)
Total		403	(16)

International career
1960–1970	Italy	36	(0)
Medal record
Men's football
Representing Italy (as player)
UEFA European Championship
Winner	1968 Italy
- * Club domestic league appearances and goals

Sandro Salvadore (Italian pronunciation: [ˈsandro salvaˈdoːre]; 29 November 1939 – 4 January 2007) was an Italian footballer who played as a defender for Italian clubs A.C. Milan and Juventus throughout his career, winning titles at both clubs. He also represented the Italy national team, participating in the 1960 Summer Olympics, and two FIFA World Cups, and was also a member of the team that won the 1968 UEFA European Football Championship.

== International career ==
From 1960 to 1970 Salvadore won 36 full caps for Italy at international level. He was part of the teams that played both at the 1962 and 1966 FIFA World Cups (the latter as captain).

== Style of play ==
Salvadore usually played as a libero, although he was also capable of playing in other defensive positions, including as a centre-back. He is considered to be one of the greatest Italian defenders of all time.

== Honours ==
Milan

- Serie A: 1958–59, 1961–62

Juventus

- Serie A: 1966–67, 1971–72, 1972–73
- Coppa Italia: 1964–65

Italy

- UEFA European Championships: 1968

Individual

- Juventus FC Hall of Fame: 2025
