= Giancarlo Bacci =

Italian footballer

Personal information
- Date of birth: 17 June 1931
- Place of birth: Peretola, Florence, Italy
- Date of death: 27 May 2014 (aged 82)
- Height: 1.80 m (5 ft 11 in)
- Position: Striker

Senior career*
Years	Team	Apps	(Gls)
1947–1948	Viareggio	25	(10)
1948–1949	Lucchese	20	(6)
1949–1951	Roma	42	(11)
1951–1952	Udinese	30	(8)
1952–1953	Bologna	31	(18)
1953–1954	Fiorentina	28	(13)
1954–1958	Torino	69	(27)
1958–1960	Milan	15	(5)
1960–1962	Padova	20	(5)
1962–1963	Cosenza	15	(?)
- * Club domestic league appearances and goals

Giancarlo Bacci (17 June 1931 – 27 May 2014) was an Italian footballer who played as a forward.

Born in Peretola, Florence, he was one of the most notable journeymen in the Serie A, where he played for 8 teams (A.S. Lucchese Libertas 1905, A.S. Roma, Udinese Calcio, Bologna F.C. 1909, ACF Fiorentina, A.C. Torino, A.C. Milan and Calcio Padova) for a total of 255 games and 93 goals.

He was on the season's top 10 Serie A scorers list for three consecutive seasons (1952–53 to 1954–55) for three different teams.
