= Carlo Galli (footballer) =

Italian footballer (1931–2022)

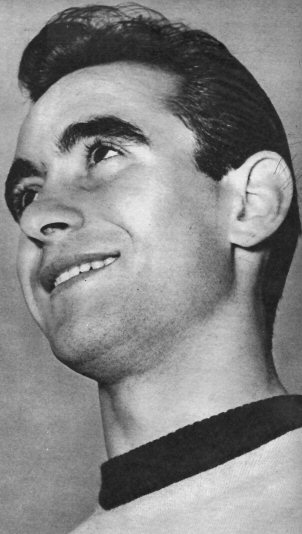
- Galli in 1953

Personal information
- Date of birth: March 6, 1931
- Place of birth: Montecatini Terme, Italy
- Date of death: November 6, 2022 (aged 91)
- Place of death: Rome, Italy
- Height: 1.81 m (5 ft 11 in)
- Position: Striker

Senior career*
Years	Team	Apps	(Gls)
1949–1951	Palermo	45	(16)
1951–1956	Roma	123	(54)
1956–1961	A.C. Milan	112	(47)
1961–1962	Udinese	8	(0)
1962–1963	Genoa	8	(3)
1963–1966	Lazio	38	(4)
Total		334	(124)

International career
1953–1959	Italy	13	(5)
- * Club domestic league appearances and goals

Giancarlo Galli (6 March 1931 – 6 November 2022), commonly known as Carlo Galli (Italian pronunciation: [(dʒaŋ)ˈkarlo ˈɡalli]), was an Italian footballer who played as a striker.

== Club career ==
Galli played for 16 seasons (305 games, 111 goals) in the Italian Serie A for U.S. Città di Palermo, A.S. Roma, A.C. Milan, Udinese Calcio, Genoa C.F.C. and S.S. Lazio. He was one of manager Giuseppe "Gipo" Viani's favourite players, and he coached while at both Palermo and Roma, before joining him at Milan in 1956, in exchange for an ageing Gunnar Nordahl. In his five seasons with Milan, Galli won two Serie A titles, and scored 47 goals, including five in a 6–1 home win over Lazio on 13 April 1958 at the San Siro.

== International career ==
At international level, Galli earned 13 caps and scored 5 goals for the Italy national team between 1953 and 1959, and participated in the 1954 FIFA World Cup.

== Style of play ==
A tall and slender player, Galli was known for his acrobatic skills as a forward, as well as his heading accuracy and ability in the air, which enabled him to function as a centre-forward. Throughout his career he was nicknamed "Carletto," as well as "Testina d'oro" (golden head), and "Esile giunco" (skinny reed), due to his playing style, aerial prowess, and physical build.

== Honours ==
Milan

- Serie A: 1956–57, 1958–59

Roma

- Serie B: 1951–52

Genoa

- Serie B: 1961–62
- Coppa delle Alpi: 1964

Italy

- Mediterranean Cup: 1950–1953

Individual

- A.C. Milan Hall of Fame
