= Luciano Alfieri =

Italian footballer (1936–2024)

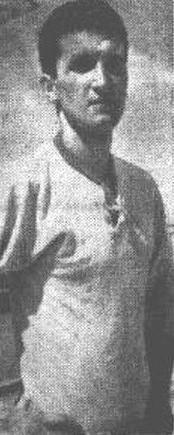

Personal information
- Date of birth: 30 March 1936
- Place of birth: Milan, Italy
- Date of death: 2 February 2024 (aged 87)
- Place of death: Milan, Italy
- Height: 1.76 m (5 ft 9 in)
- Position: Goalkeeper

Senior career*
Years	Team	Apps	(Gls)
1955–1956	AC Milan		
1956–1957	Siracusa		
1957–1962	AC Milan		
1962–1963	Lecco		
1963–1964	Treviso		
1964–1965	AC Milan		

International career
- Italy
- * Club domestic league appearances and goals

Luciano Alfieri (30 March 1936 – 2 February 2024) was an Italian footballer who played as a goalkeeper. He competed in the men's tournament at the 1960 Summer Olympics. Alfieri died on 2 February 2024, at the age of 87.
