= José Altafini =

Brazilian-Italian footballer

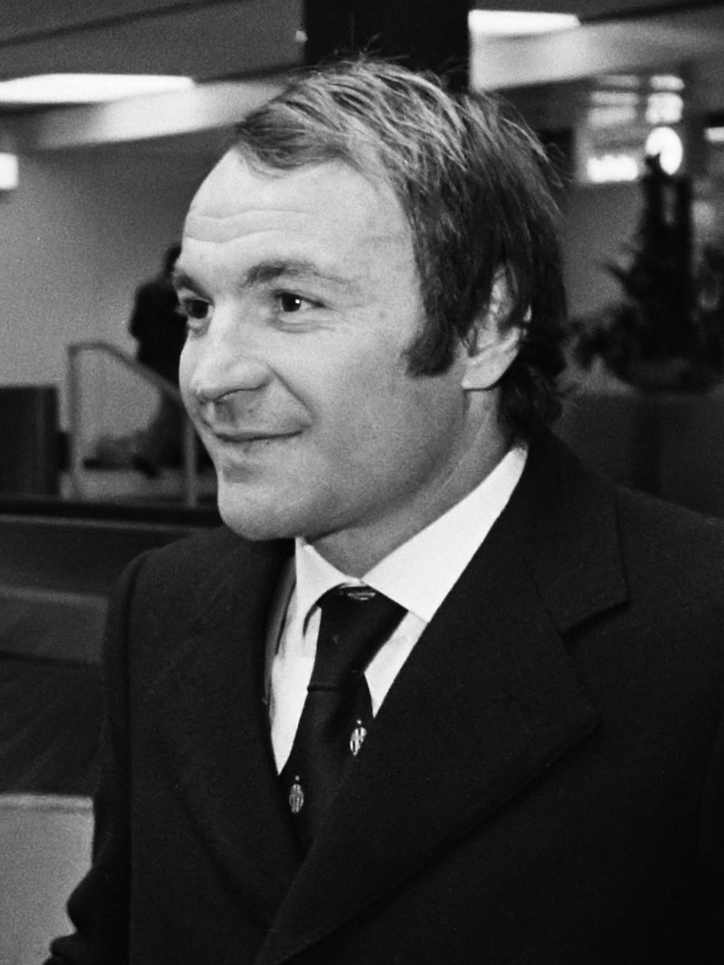
- Altafini in 1974

Personal information
- Full name: José João Altafini
- Date of birth: 24 July 1938 (age 88)
- Place of birth: Piracicaba, Brazil
- Height: 1.76 m (5 ft 9 in)
- Position: Striker

Senior career*
Years	Team	Apps	(Gls)
1956–1958	Palmeiras	114	(89)
1958–1965	AC Milan	205	(120)
1965–1972	Napoli	180	(71)
1972–1976	Juventus	74	(25)
1976	Toronto Italia		
1976–1979	Chiasso	60	(18)
1979–1980	Mendrisiostar	20	(11)
Total		653	(334)

International career
1957–1958	Brazil	8	(4)
1961–1962	Italy	6	(5)
Medal record
Men's Football
Representing Brazil
FIFA World Cup
Winner	1958 Sweden
- * Club domestic league appearances and goals

José João Altafini (Italian: [altaˈfiːni]; born 24 July 1938), also known as "Mazzola" in Brazil, is an Italian-Brazilian former footballer, who played as a forward. Although, he began his career with Palmeiras in Brazil, he soon moved to play football in Italy, and is mostly remembered for his highly successful stint with Italian club AC Milan, with which he achieved a great domestic and international success; he later played for Napoli and Juventus, before ending his career in Switzerland with spells at Chiasso and Mendrisiostar. A highly prolific goalscorer, Altafini also held the record for the most goals scored in a single European Cup campaign for over 50 years; he is also one of only eight players to have scored five goals in a single European Cup match. He is the joint-fourth highest scorer in Italian Serie A history (along with Giuseppe Meazza) with 216 goals, and also holds the record for being the fifth-youngest player in Serie A history to score 100 goals, a feat which he managed at the age of 24 years and 239 days. Regarded as one of the best strikers of his generation, and as one of Serie A's and Milan's greatest-ever players, Altafini had an eye for goal and was quick, skilful and powerful.

At the international level, Altafini represented both Brazil and Italy; he was a member of the Brazilian side that won the 1958 FIFA World Cup, and later also represented Italy at the 1962 FIFA World Cup.

Altafini was a football pundit on Italian TV for SKY Italia and a commentator on Italian radio for RTL 102.5, as well as being the secondary commentator on the Pro Evolution Soccer video games in Italy. Altafini coined the expression "golaço" (or the Italianised "golazzo") whenever a notable goal is scored and was known for his iconic exclamation "incredibile, amici!" ("incredible, friends!"). In his career, Altafini scored 630 goals.

== Early life ==
Altafini was born on 24 July 1938 in Piracicaba, a city in the state of São Paulo, Brazil, with a large Italian community, mostly originating from Trentino Alto Adige, where certain dialects are still spoken. He came from a working-class family of Italian origin, born to Gioacchino Altafini and Maria Marchesoni, his mother being from Caldonazzo (Trentino), which enabled him to obtain Italian citizenship. José's father worked in a sugar factory, while his mother worked as a housemaid for a wealthy family. José began playing football for the youth side of his city at the age of 16, the XV de Novembro Sporting Club. It was during this time that he earned his nickname "Mazzola", due to his physical resemblance to legendary Italian attacking midfielder Valentino Mazzola. At the age of 17, he began to play for the youth side of the Italian-Brazilian São Paulo club Palmeiras, initially as an attacking midfielder or winger, before being moved to a more offensive position as a forward.

== Club career ==
=== Palmeiras ===
Altafini made his debut for the Italian-Brazilian Palmeiras team of São Paulo in Brazil on 29 January 1956, scoring a brace on his debut, and becoming the youngest goalscorer for the club, at the age of 17, a record which stands until Endrick overcome this. He played for the Brazilian club for two seasons (1956 and 1957), scoring 32 goals in 63 matches competitive, and 89 goals in 114 matches including semi-official matches and friendly matches. His goalscoring ratio of 0.74 goals per game is the fifth best ever average for a Palmeiras player. On 9 June 1957, he scored all five goals in Palmeiras's 5–0 win over Noroeste, which is also a joint-club record for the most goals by a single player in a Palmeiras match. On 6 March 1958, Altafini scored two goals in a historic match against the legendary Santos team of Pelé, Pepe and Zito in the Torneio Rio-São Paulo. Altafini was one of the protagonists of the match, which ended in a 7–6 win to Santos, despite his goals.

=== AC Milan ===
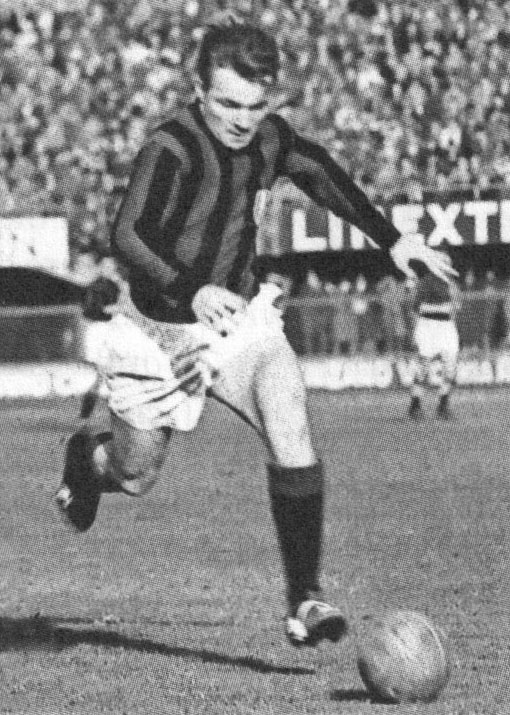
Altafini playing for AC Milan

Altafini began his career in Italy with AC Milan in 1958, following the World Cup in Sweden; his talent and offensive potential had been noticed by Milan's agents during some friendly matches in Italy against Inter and Fiorentina in preparation for the upcoming tournament, in which Altafini scored. He was purchased by the Italian club prior to the World Cup in Sweden for 135 million Lire. Altafini made his scoreless Milan debut on 21 September 1958, at the age of 20, and, in his first season, he played 32 games and scored 28 goals, winning the 1958–59 Serie A title along the way, and demonstrating his goalscoring prowess; he also managed 4 goals in 4 Coppa Italia appearances that season, finishing the season with a total of 32 goals in 36 appearances in all competitions. His first league goal came on 5 October in a win against Bari. Altafini was the top scorer of the 1960–61 Coppa Italia, with 4 goals, although Milan were not able to make it past the second round of the competition. On 27 March 1960, he scored four goals in the Milan derby against local rivals Inter, which ended in a 5–3 victory for Milan. During these next few seasons, Milan managed a third-place and second-place finish, as Altafini continued to reach the 20-goal season mark. On 12 November 1961, he also managed four goals against Juventus, as Milan went on to win the Serie A title again during the 1961–62 season, in which Altafini finished as the league's joint top scorer with 22 goals in 33 games, alongside Aurelio Milani.

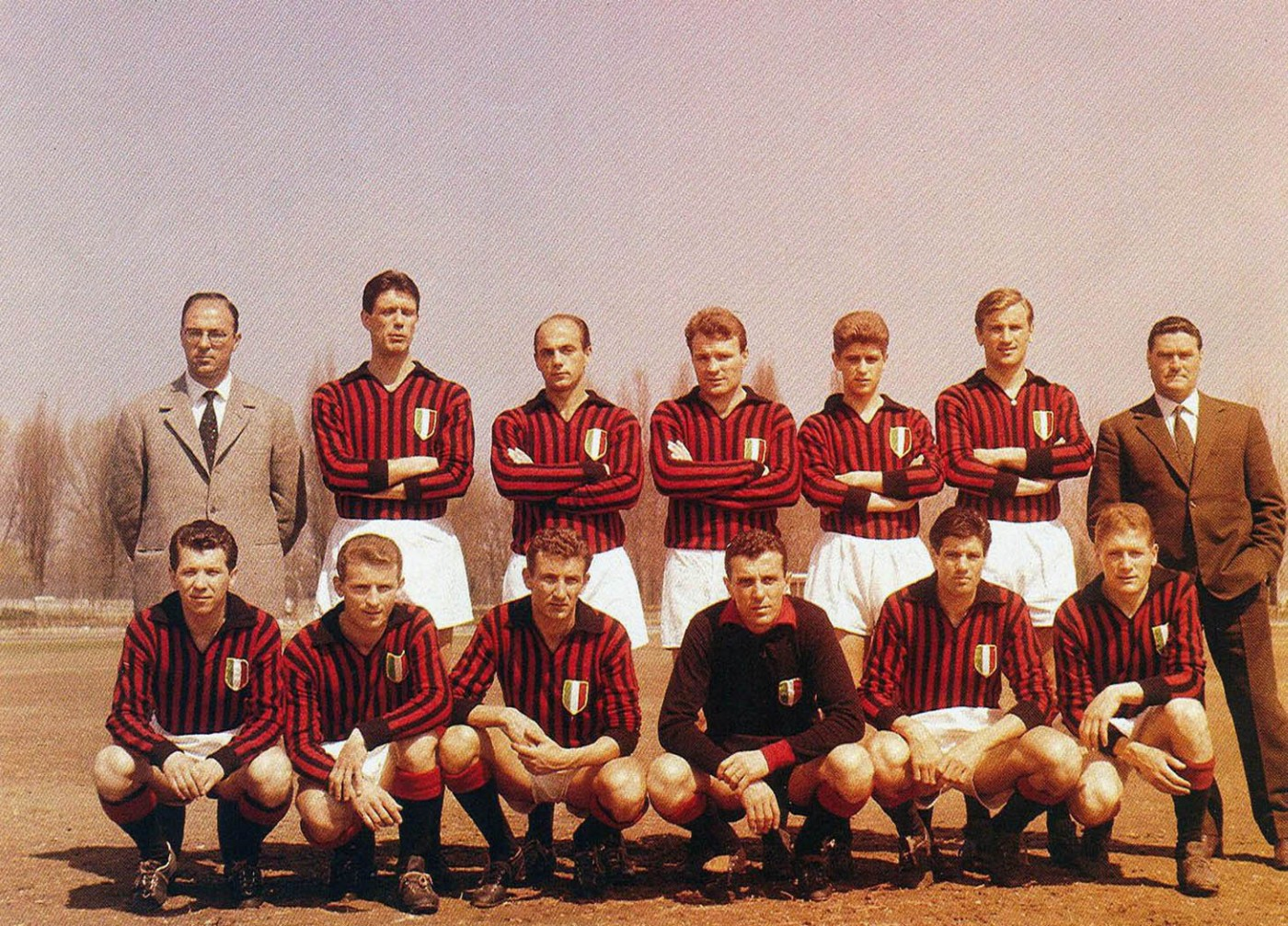
Altafini (top row, center) with AC Milan in the 1961–62 season

In the 1963 European Cup Final, Altafini scored two goals against Benfica to secure Milan's first European triumph. The game ended 2–1, and Altafini finished the competition as the top scorer with a record of 14 goals, which was only broken during the 2013–14 season by Cristiano Ronaldo, who managed 17 goals. In Milan's 5–0 win over l'Union Luxembourg, he managed to score five goals in a single match of the competition, a record which he shares with eight other footballers, including Lionel Messi. Milan were defeated in the 1963 Intercontinental Cup final 1–0 by Pelé's Santos in a play-off match following a 6–6 draw on aggregate; Altafini scored one goal in the competition, in Milan's 4–2 second leg defeat. Altafini's performances led him to be nominated for the 1963 and 1964 Ballon d'Or awards, in which he finished in 11th and 16th place respectively. His appearances became more limited during the next few seasons at the club, as Milan went trophyless, finishing in second place behind Inter during the 1964–65 season. During his seven seasons with Milan, Altafini was able to win two Serie A titles, and a European Cup, as well as the top goalscoring awards in Serie A, the Coppa Italia and the European Cup.

=== Napoli ===
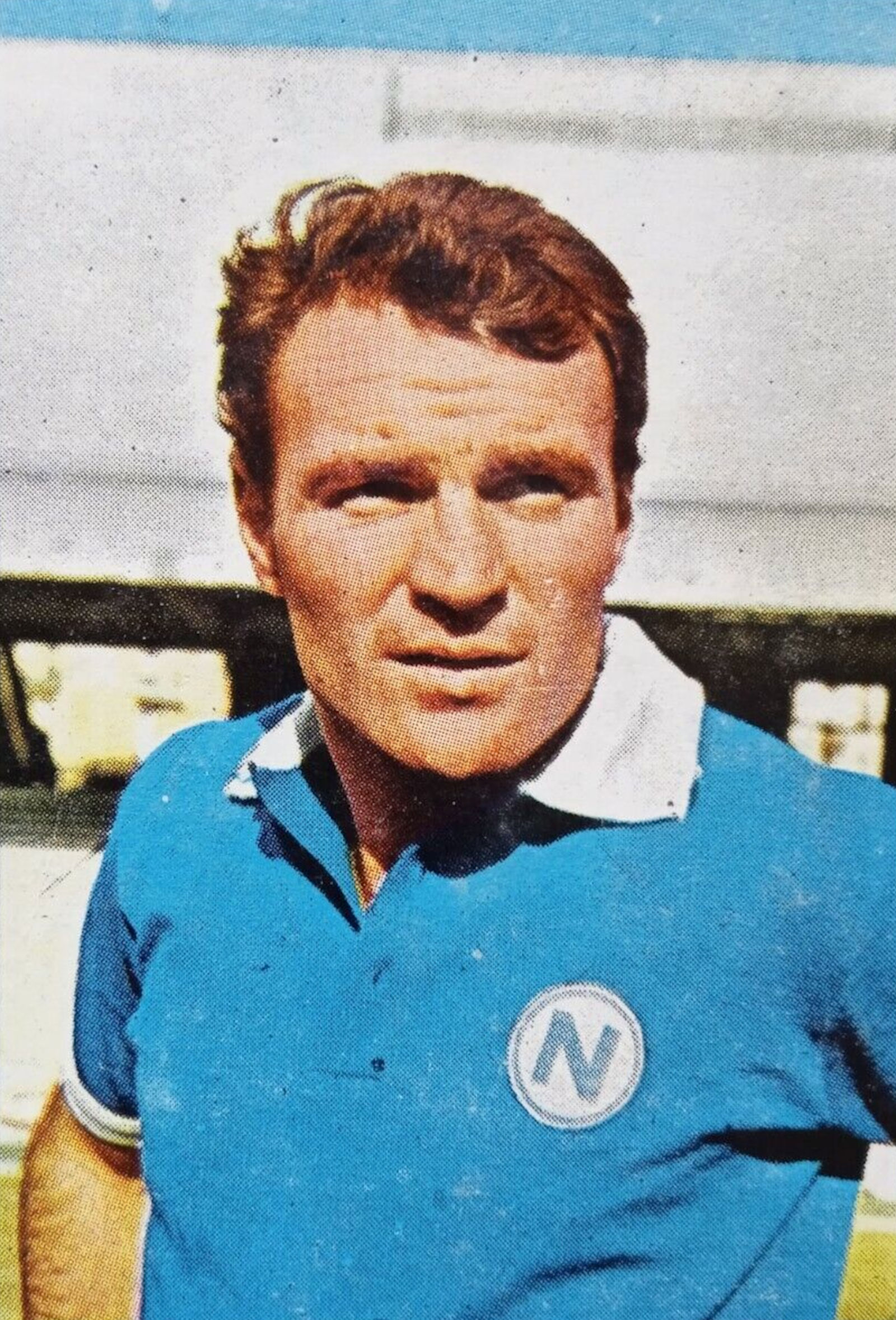
Altafini with Napoli in 1965

In 1965, Altafini joined Napoli due to his disagreements with Amarildo and Paolo Ferrario at Milan. In a 2024 interview, Altafini explained: "The last year... only that last year with that story I don't want to recount. Let's say Gipo Viani sent me away; he put me on the market and I went to Napoli." When asked if he would have stayed at Milan otherwise, he said, "Of course! They sold me because it wasn't possible to continue that way."

Altafini formed a notable attacking partnership with Italo-Argentine advanced playmaker Omar Sívori, who had been his Italy teammate at the 1962 World Cup in Chile. He remained at the club for seven years, until 1972. On 31 December 1967, in a 2–2 home draw against Torino, Altafini scored an acrobatic goal from a bicycle kick, a "golaço" which made him extremely popular with the Napoli fans. During his time at the club, he helped Napoli to compete for the title regularly, and he was able to lead Napoli to their best ever Serie A finish up until that point, helping them to finish second in the 1967–68 Serie A campaign, behind his former club Milan, also finishing as the second highest goalscorer in Serie A that season. He also helped them finish in third place in 1966 and 1971. During the 1971–72 season, Altafini also helped Napoli to the 1971–72 Coppa Italia final, although they were defeated 2–0 by his previous club, Milan. Despite his role in the club's history, during his time at Napoli, Altafini only managed to win a minor trophy, the Coppa delle Alpi, during the 1966–67 season.

=== Juventus ===
After his time at Napoli, Altafini joined Juventus along with his former Napoli teammate, goalkeeping legend Dino Zoff. Despite his advancing age, which often led him to be used as a substitute, Altafini was decisive in helping Juventus to win two more Serie A titles during the 1972–73 and the 1974–75 seasons. During the 1972–73 season, Juventus were one point behind Milan, who were leading the Serie A table, before their final match of the season against Roma. Juventus were trailing at half-time, but Altafini scored a crucial equaliser (his ninth of the season), before Antonello Cuccureddu scored the late match winner. Milan were defeated in Verona, and Juventus's victory allowed them to capture the Serie A title. Another one of his most notable moments during his Juventus career was his goal against his former club, Napoli, during the 1974–75 season, at the age of 37. Before the match, Juventus were in first place, two points ahead of Napoli, in second place; Altafini came off the bench a few minutes before the end of the match, scoring the match winner in the 88th minute, helping Juventus to a 2–1 victory, which allowed them to increase their lead over Napoli and win the title; Altafini managed eight goals in 20 appearances that season. A few days after the match, a banner with the writing "José core 'ngrato" was placed on one of the gates of the San Paolo stadium, referencing the fact that Altafini had previously played for the Neapolitan club.

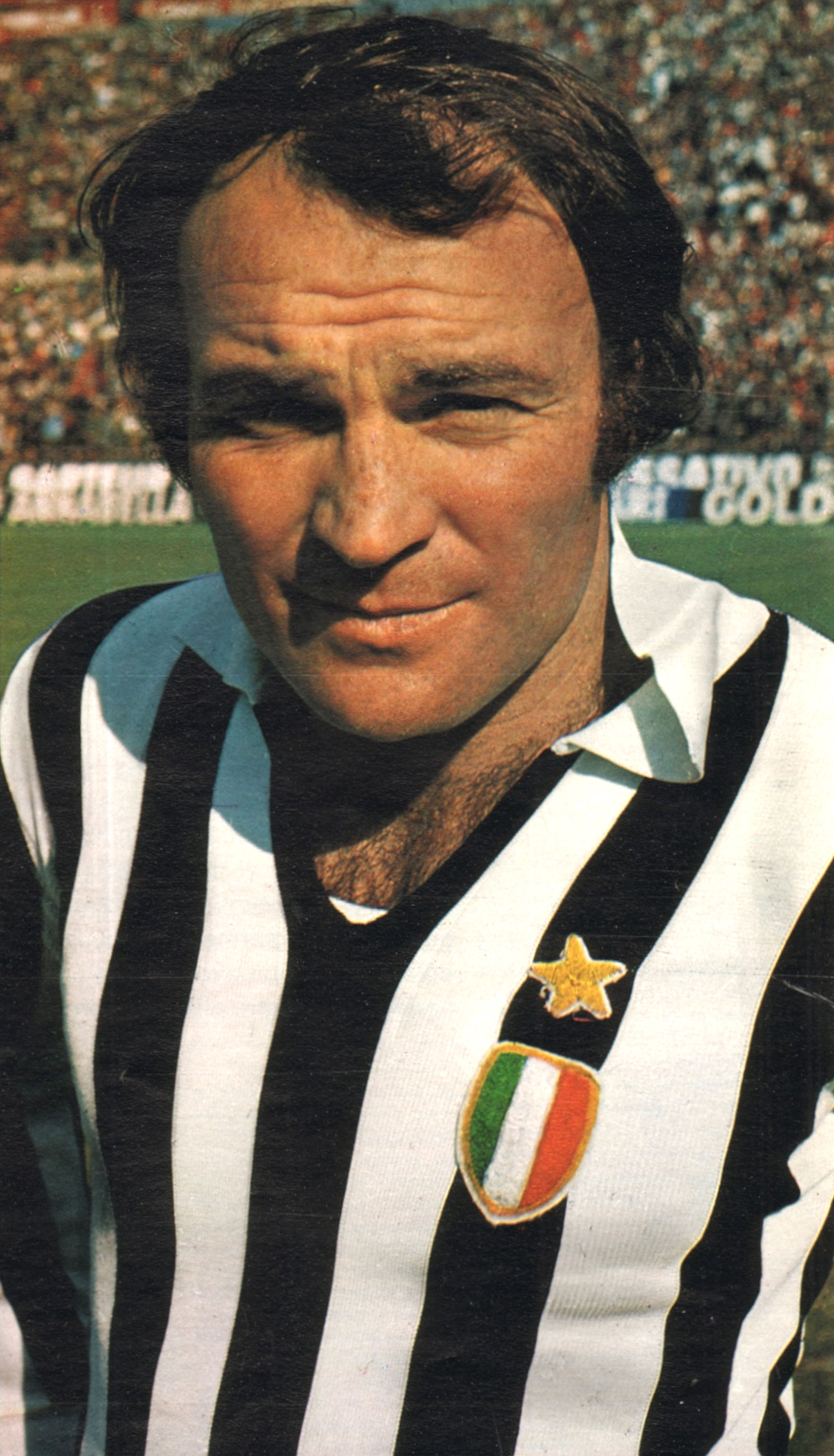
Altafini with Juventus in the 1972–73 season

He also helped Juventus to a Coppa Italia and a European Cup Final in 1973, scoring a goal in the quarter-finals of the 1972–73 European Cup against Újpesti Dózsa, and two goals in the semi-final against Derby County. Juventus narrowly missed out on a treble by losing both cup finals despite their 1973 league title. Their Coppa Italia defeat came at the hands of Altafini's former club, Milan, once again, on penalties, while Juventus were defeated by Ajax in the European Cup final. During the 1973–74 season, Juventus went trophyless, although Altafini managed 7 goals in 21 appearances, and in his final season, Altafini made only 10 appearances however, as Juventus missed out on the title, finishing in second place behind local rivals Torino; Altafini decided to leave Serie A after 18 seasons in Italy.

By the time he left Juventus at the age of 38 in 1976, Altafini had played 459 games in Serie A and had scored 216 goals, although he had scored most of these in the early part of his career. In fact, he only scored 53 goals in his last 8 seasons in Italy, whereas he had scored 134 in his first 8. He is currently the fourth highest goalscorer of all time in Serie A, alongside Giuseppe Meazza, and behind only Silvio Piola, Totti and Nordahl. He also holds the second highest number of appearances in Serie A by a non-Italian-born player, behind Javier Zanetti.

=== Later career in Switzerland and retirement ===
After leaving Italy in 1976, Altafini briefly played in the National Soccer League with Toronto Italia, where he appeared in the 1976 CONCACAF Champions' Cup. He later played for four years in Switzerland for Chiasso, playing in the second division, and earning a promotion into the Super League thanks to his goals, scoring 14 goals in 26 league games in his first season. He later played for Mendrisiostar, another team in the Swiss second division, before retiring at the age of 42 in 1980, after a 25-season professional footballing career.

== International career ==
=== Brazil ===
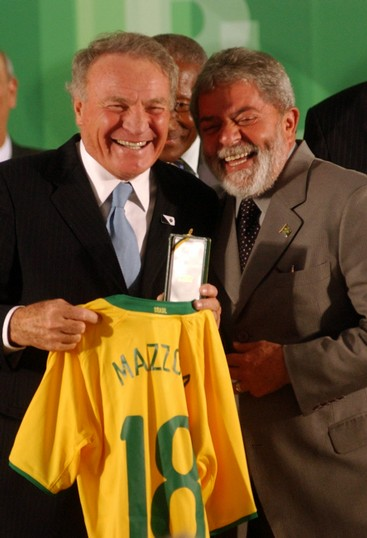
Altafini (left) in 2008

Altafini made his international debut for Brazil at the age of 18 and 327 days on 16 June 1957, marking his first appearance with a goal against Portugal in a 3–0 friendly victory. On the 7 and 10 July, he helped Brazil to win the Copa Roca against rivals Argentina, alongside debutant Pelé, scoring a goal.

Altafini, playing as Mazzola, was a member of the Brazil team that won the 1958 FIFA World Cup in Sweden, and at 19 was the second-youngest member of the squad, after Pelé, to be called up. He started the tournament strongly, scoring two goals in the opening group match against Austria on 8 June, which ended in a 3–0 win, but he was injured during the second group match against England three days later, which ended in a 0–0 draw, and as a result he missed the final group match against the Soviet Union on 15 June, which Brazil won 2–0. He returned to the starting line-up in the quarter-final match against Wales on 19 June, putting on a strong performance and helping Pelé to score the only goal of the match. He later scored a brilliant overhead kick from the edge of the penalty area, which was unfortunately disallowed by the referee. He was replaced by Vavá for the semi-final victory against France (5–2) on 24 June, and manager Vicente Feola also left him out in favour of Vavá once again from the squad that would lift the World Cup in the final over hosts Sweden on 29 June, following a 5–2 victory. In total he made 8 appearances for the Brazilian national side, scoring 4 goals.

=== Italy ===
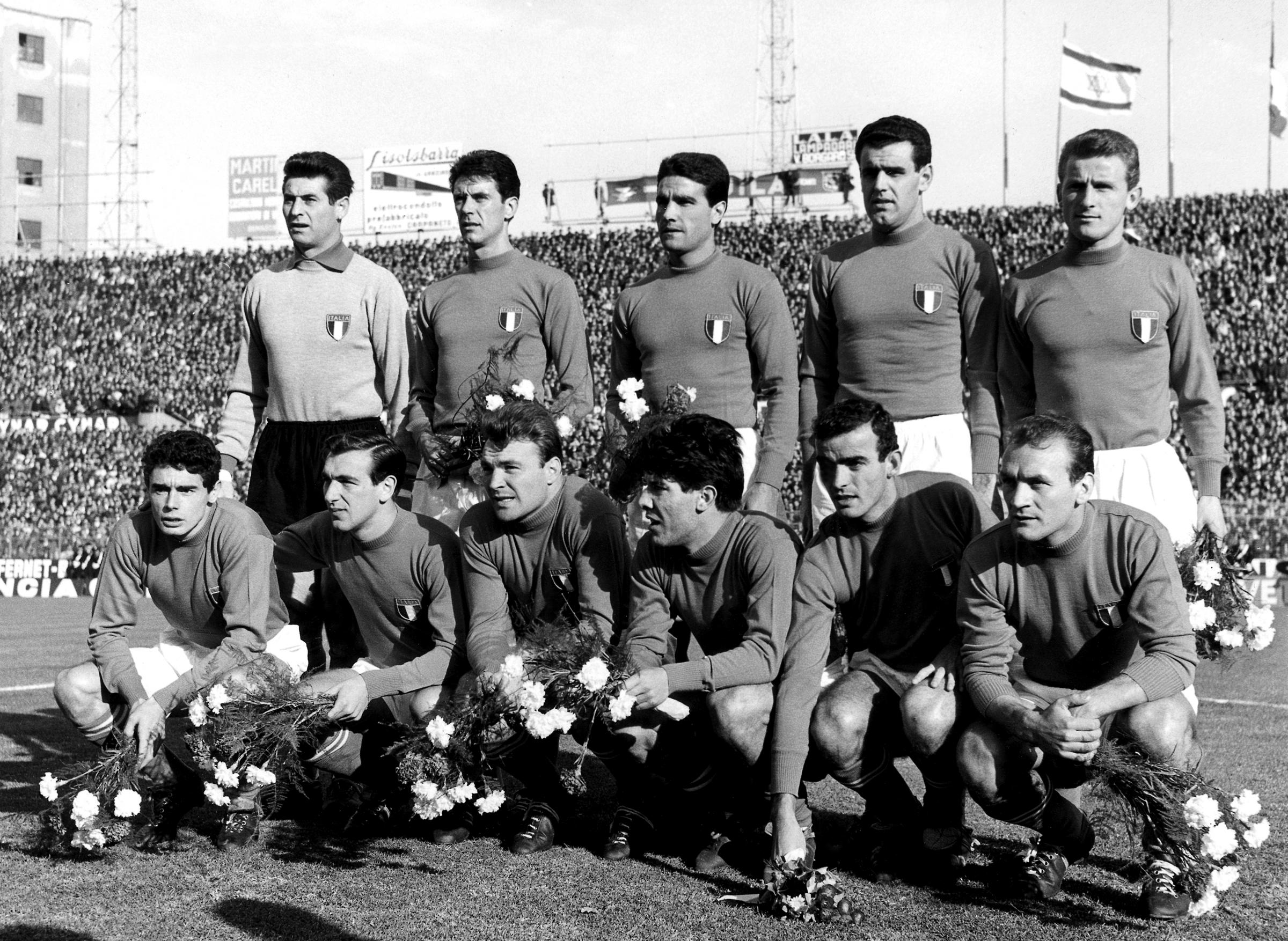
Altafini (crouched, third from right) lining up for Italy in 1962

In the 1962 FIFA World Cup, he played for Italy under his own name, stating: "It was very simple. Back then Brazil never called on players who were based overseas. Never. I was only 23 or 24 and I would have been devastated at missing a World Cup. It wasn't me who left Brazil. It was Brazil that left me."

Altafini made his debut for Italy on 15 October 1961, in a play-off against Israel for a place at the 1962 FIFA World Cup. He scored in a 4–2 victory in Ramat Gan and also featured in the second leg as the Italians booked their place at the tournament. Prior to the World Cup, he scored two braces in friendly wins over France and Belgium. Altafini played in the first two group matches of the 1962 World Cup, against West Germany and Chile, as Italy were eliminated in the first round. Despite being only 24, he did not receive another call-up for Italy following Italy's disappointing World Cup campaign, and he was criticised throughout the tournament for avoiding physical challenges and giving up possession too easily. Altafini made six appearances for Italy, scoring five goals, bringing his total international tally to nine goals in 14 appearances.

== Style of play ==
Altafini was known to have excellent control, technique, flair and dribbling ability. He was also a highly agile player, having started his career as an attacking midfielder or winger, before being switched to a more offensive role as a centre-forward. He was a highly prolific goalscorer throughout his career, due to his powerful, accurate shot and ability to make attacking runs, as well as his agility inside the penalty area.

== Media ==
=== Punditry ===
After retiring from football, Altafini became a notable football commentator in Italy, where he coined the term golazzo, a transliteration of the word golaço from his native Portuguese, which roughly translates into English as 'great goal'; although it is not actually a word in Italian. A sound bite of his use of the phrase while commentating was used at the start and finish of Channel 4's Football Italia.

=== Film ===
In the biographical film Pelé: Birth of a Legend, Altafini is portrayed by Mexican actor Diego Boneta.

=== Author ===
Altafini also co-wrote two books: Incredibile amici! Il mio manuale del calcio, along with Pierluigi Pardo, and Futebol e alegria. Personaggi, fatti, aneddoti del mio calcio, along with Maurizio Barberis.

== Career statistics ==
=== Club ===
Appearances and goals by club, season and competition
Club	Season	League		Cup		Europe (Note: Includes UEFA European Cup, UEFA Cup Winners' Cup, UEFA Cup.)		Other		Total	
Club	Season	Apps	Goals	Apps	Goals	Apps	Goals	Apps	Goals	Apps	Goals
AC Milan	1958–59	32	28	4	4			2	2	38	34
AC Milan	1959–60	33	20			4	2	2	4	39	26
AC Milan	1960–61	34	22	2	4			2	0	38	26
AC Milan	1961–62	33	22			2	0			35	22
AC Milan	1962–63	31	11	2	1	9	14	4	5	46	31
AC Milan	1963–64	30	14	1	0	4	4	3	1	38	19
AC Milan	1964–65	12	3							12	3
AC Milan	Total	205	120	9	9	19	20	13	12	246	161
Napoli	1965–66	34	14	2	1			5	7	41	22
Napoli	1966–67	27	16	1	1	5	1			33	18
Napoli	1967–68	29	13	2	1	3	3			34	17
Napoli	1968–69	21	5	4	2	3	1			28	8
Napoli	1969–70	15	8	3	0	3	0	5	3	26	11
Napoli	1970–71	25	7	11	4					36	11
Napoli	1971–72	29	8	5	2	2	0			36	10
Napoli	Total	180	71	28	11	16	5	10	10	234	97
Juventus	1972–73	23	9	6	0	6	3			35	12
Juventus	1973–74	21	7	8	2	2	1	1	0	32	10
Juventus	1974–75	20	8	6	0	9	5			35	13
Juventus	1975–76	10	1	4	1	3	0			17	2
Juventus	Total	74	25	24	3	20	9	1	0	119	37
Career total		459	216	61	23	55	34	24	22	599	295

=== International ===
Appearances and goals by national team and year
National team	Year	Apps	Goals
Brazil	1957	3	2
Brazil	1958	5	2
Total		8	4
Italy	1961	2	1
Italy	1962	4	4
Total		6	5

Scores and results list Brazil's and Italy's goal tally first, score column indicates score after each Altafini goal.

List of international goals scored by José Altafini
No.	Date	Venue	Opponent	Score	Result	Competition	Ref.
Brazil goals
1	16 June 1957	Pacaembu Stadium, São Paulo, Brazil	Portugal	–	3–0	Friendly	
2	10 July 1957	Pacaembu Stadium, São Paulo, Brazil	Argentina	–	2–0	1957 Roca Cup	
3	8 June 1958	Rimnersvallen, Uddevalla, Sweden	Austria	1–0	3–0	1958 FIFA World Cup	
4	8 June 1958	Rimnersvallen, Uddevalla, Sweden	Austria	3–0	3–0	1958 FIFA World Cup	
Italy goals
5	15 October 1961	Ramat Gan Stadium, Ramat Gan, Israel	Israel	2–2	4–2	1962 FIFA World Cup qualification	
6	5 May 1962	Stadio Comunale, Florence, Italy	France	1–1	2–1	Friendly	
7	5 May 1962	Stadio Comunale, Florence, Italy	France	2–1	2–1	Friendly	
8	13 May 1962	Stade du Heysel, Brussels, Belgium	Belgium	2–1	3–1	Friendly	
9	13 May 1962	Stade du Heysel, Brussels, Belgium	Belgium	3–1	3–1	Friendly	

== Honours ==
AC Milan

- Serie A: 1958–59, 1961–62
- European Cup: 1962–63

Juventus

- Serie A: 1972–73, 1974–75

Napoli

- Coppa delle Alpi: 1966

Brazil

- FIFA World Cup: 1958

Individual

- Coppa Italia top goal scorer: 1960–61 (4 goals, alongside Gianfranco Petris and Luigi Milan)
- Serie A top Goal-scorer: 1961–62
- European Cup top goalscorer: 1962–63
- AC Milan Hall of Fame
- Golden Foot: 2019, as football legend

Sporting positions
Preceded by Sergio Brighenti	Serie A Top Scorer (Shared with Aurelio Milani); 1961–62	Succeeded by Harald Nielsen; Pedro Manfredini
