= Pierluigi Ronzon =

Italian footballer

Personal information
- Date of birth: 7 March 1934 (age 92)
- Place of birth: Gemona del Friuli, Italy
- Height: 1.76 m (5 ft 9 in)
- Positions: Defensive midfielder; sweeper

Senior career*
Years	Team	Apps	(Gls)
1952–57	Sampdoria	82	(22)
1957–60	Atalanta	98	(7)
1960–61	Milan	20	(3)
1961–67	Napoli	200	(11)
1967–68	Lazio	40	(0)

International career
1960	Italy	1	(0)
- * Club domestic league appearances and goals

Pierluigi Ronzon (Italian pronunciation: [ˌpjɛrluˈiːdʒi ronˈdzon]; born 7 March 1934) is a former Italian football player from Gemona del Friuli in the Province of Udine. He played club football as a midfielder or defender for some of the top clubs in his country, including Sampdoria, Napoli, Lazio, Atalanta and A.C. Milan.

At international level, he represented Italy on one occasion, in a game played on 13 March 1960. Notably, for Napoli he scored the match-winning goal of the 1961–62 Coppa Italia final against Spal 1907; this was the first time a club from Serie B had won the cup.

== Honours ==
Atalanta

- Serie B: 1958–59

Napoli

- Coppa Italia: 1961–62
- Coppa delle Alpi: 1966
