= Giancarlo Danova =

Italian footballer (1938–2014)

Personal information
- Date of birth: 18 November 1938
- Place of birth: Sesto San Giovanni, Italy
- Date of death: 15 June 2014 (aged 75)
- Height: 1.67 m (5 ft 6 in)
- Position: Forward

Senior career*
| Years | Team | Apps | (Gls) |
| 1957–1960 | Milan | 60 | (30) |
| 1960–1961 | Torino | 26 | (5) |
| 1961–1962 | Milan | 17 | (8) |
| 1962–1963 | Torino | 20 | (3) |
| 1963–1965 | Catania | 57 | (19) |
| 1965–1968 | Atalanta | 80 | (16) |
| 1968–1969 | Fiorentina | 2 | (0) |
| 1969–1970 | Mantova | 17 | (2) |
- * Club domestic league appearances and goals

Giancarlo Danova (18 November 1938 – 15 June 2014) was an Italian football forward who played for Milan, Torino, Catania, Atalanta, Fiorentina and Mantova. During his career he played on three Italian Championship sides.

== Domestic League Records ==
| Year | Competition | Apps | Goal |
|---|---|---|---|
| 1957–1969 | Serie A | 262 | 81 |
| 1969–1970 | Serie B | 17 | 2 |
| Total | | 279 | 83 |

== Honours ==
Milan

- Serie A:

Winner : 2

1958–59, 1961–62

Fiorentina

- Serie A:

Winner : 1

1968–69
