= 1958–59 Serie A =

56th season of top-tier Italian football

Serie A
- Season: 1958–59
- Champions: Milan; 7th title
- Relegated: Triestina; Torino
- European Cup: Milan
- Matches: 306
- Goals: 897 (2.93 per match)
- Top goalscorer: Antonio Valentín Angelillo (33 goals)

Serie A 1958-59 team distribution

The 1958–59 Serie A season was the 29th edition of Serie A, the top-level football competition in Italy. The championship was won by Milan.

== Teams ==
Triestina and Bari had been promoted from Serie B.

== Final classification ==
| Pos | Team | Pld | W | D | L | GF | GA | GD | Pts | Qualification or relegation |
|---|---|---|---|---|---|---|---|---|---|---|
| 1 | Milan (C) | 34 | 20 | 12 | 2 | 84 | 32 | +52 | 52 | Qualification to European Cup |
| 2 | Fiorentina | 34 | 20 | 9 | 5 | 95 | 35 | +60 | 49 | |
| 3 | Internazionale | 34 | 20 | 6 | 8 | 77 | 41 | +36 | 46 | |
| 4 | Juventus | 34 | 16 | 10 | 8 | 74 | 51 | +23 | 42 | |
| 5 | Sampdoria | 34 | 15 | 8 | 11 | 50 | 44 | +6 | 38 | |
| 6 | Roma | 34 | 12 | 11 | 11 | 57 | 41 | +16 | 35 | |
| 7 | Vicenza | 34 | 13 | 8 | 13 | 41 | 41 | 0 | 34 | |
| 7 | Padova | 34 | 13 | 8 | 13 | 50 | 52 | −2 | 34 | |
| 7 | Napoli | 34 | 9 | 16 | 9 | 39 | 50 | −11 | 34 | |
| 10 | Bologna | 34 | 10 | 11 | 13 | 47 | 53 | −6 | 31 | |
| 11 | Bari | 34 | 9 | 12 | 13 | 38 | 49 | −11 | 30 | |
| 11 | Genoa | 34 | 10 | 10 | 14 | 44 | 62 | −18 | 30 | |
| 11 | Lazio | 34 | 10 | 10 | 14 | 37 | 54 | −17 | 30 | |
| 14 | Alessandria | 34 | 8 | 12 | 14 | 33 | 57 | −24 | 28 | |
| 15 | Udinese | 34 | 8 | 11 | 15 | 32 | 59 | −27 | 27 | |
| 16 | SPAL | 34 | 8 | 10 | 16 | 29 | 48 | −19 | 26 | |
| 17 | Triestina (R) | 34 | 6 | 11 | 17 | 34 | 56 | −22 | 23 | Relegation to Serie B |
| 17 | Torino (R) | 34 | 6 | 11 | 17 | 36 | 72 | −36 | 23 | Relegation to Serie B |

Source: Panini
(C) Champions; (R) Relegated

Juventus was the cupwinner.

== Results ==
| Home \ Away | ALE | BAR | BOL | FIO | GEN | INT | JUV | LRV | LAZ | MIL | NAP | PAD | ROM | SAM | SPA | TOR | TRI | UDI |
|---|---|---|---|---|---|---|---|---|---|---|---|---|---|---|---|---|---|---|
| Alessandria | | 2–1 | 1–0 | 1–4 | 0–0 | 1–1 | 2–2 | 1–0 | 0–2 | 1–2 | 2–1 | 1–3 | 1–1 | 1–1 | 2–0 | 0–0 | 4–3 | 1–1 |
| Bari | 1–0 | | 0–0 | 1–2 | 1–2 | 1–2 | 1–1 | 2–2 | 2–2 | 0–2 | 0–0 | 1–0 | 2–1 | 2–1 | 2–1 | 4–1 | 0–0 | 2–1 |
| Bologna | 4–0 | 1–1 | | 0–4 | 2–1 | 2–2 | 4–1 | 1–0 | 1–1 | 1–1 | 1–1 | 2–0 | 1–0 | 1–2 | 3–2 | 0–0 | 0–2 | 2–0 |
| Fiorentina | 7–1 | 4–0 | 6–3 | | 7–1 | 4–0 | 3–3 | 3–1 | 1–1 | 1–3 | 4–1 | 3–0 | 1–1 | 4–1 | 1–2 | 4–0 | 4–1 | 7–0 |
| Genoa | 1–1 | 1–0 | 1–0 | 0–0 | | 4–2 | 0–1 | 0–1 | 0–0 | 0–2 | 3–3 | 2–1 | 2–2 | 0–0 | 0–3 | 3–0 | 1–1 | 1–0 |
| Internazionale | 1–0 | 2–1 | 5–1 | 1–3 | 4–1 | | 1–3 | 2–0 | 4–0 | 1–0 | 1–1 | 3–0 | 3–2 | 5–1 | 8–0 | 1–0 | 1–0 | 5–0 |
| Juventus | 2–2 | 2–2 | 2–2 | 3–2 | 4–3 | 3–2 | | 2–3 | 6–1 | 4–5 | 2–0 | 2–1 | 2–0 | 1–0 | 1–1 | 4–3 | 4–0 | 3–0 |
| Vicenza | 1–0 | 0–0 | 1–1 | 1–2 | 1–2 | 2–1 | 1–0 | | 1–0 | 2–0 | 2–3 | 3–2 | 4–1 | 1–2 | 1–1 | 2–0 | 5–4 | 2–0 |
| Lazio | 0–2 | 3–2 | 2–1 | 0–0 | 2–4 | 1–2 | 1–0 | 0–1 | | 0–0 | 0–0 | 1–1 | 1–3 | 1–0 | 4–0 | 2–0 | 3–1 | 1–1 |
| Milan | 5–1 | 4–2 | 4–3 | 2–0 | 4–0 | 1–1 | 1–1 | 0–0 | 5–0 | | 6–1 | 4–1 | 4–1 | 4–1 | 0–0 | 5–1 | 2–0 | 7–0 |
| Napoli | 0–0 | 1–2 | 4–2 | 2–3 | 2–2 | 1–0 | 0–0 | 1–0 | 1–1 | 0–1 | | 2–1 | 3–0 | 3–2 | 0–0 | 2–2 | 1–0 | 1–1 |
| Padova | 0–0 | 0–0 | 1–0 | 1–1 | 4–2 | 2–0 | 1–4 | 3–1 | 3–1 | 0–1 | 0–0 | | 3–3 | 2–1 | 2–1 | 4–0 | 2–2 | 2–1 |
| Roma | 0–2 | 3–1 | 0–1 | 0–0 | 5–0 | 2–2 | 3–0 | 3–1 | 3–0 | 1–1 | 8–0 | 1–1 | | 1–0 | 2–0 | 4–1 | 1–0 | 3–0 |
| Sampdoria | 3–1 | 3–0 | 2–1 | 1–1 | 2–1 | 2–4 | 3–2 | 2–0 | 1–2 | 0–0 | 0–0 | 3–0 | 0–0 | | 1–1 | 3–0 | 2–0 | 3–1 |
| SPAL | 1–1 | 0–1 | 0–1 | 0–0 | 1–5 | 0–1 | 0–0 | 0–0 | 0–3 | 1–1 | 2–1 | 0–2 | 1–0 | 1–2 | | 3–0 | 4–0 | 0–1 |
| Torino | 6–1 | 2–2 | 2–2 | 0–6 | 0–0 | 0–5 | 3–2 | 1–1 | 1–0 | 3–3 | 1–2 | 3–1 | 2–2 | 1–2 | 1–0 | | 1–0 | 0–1 |
| Triestina | 2–0 | 0–0 | 3–2 | 1–3 | 2–1 | 1–1 | 0–3 | 0–0 | 3–0 | 2–2 | 0–0 | 2–4 | 1–0 | 1–2 | 0–1 | 1–1 | | 1–1 |
| Udinese | 1–0 | 3–1 | 1–1 | 2–0 | 4–0 | 1–3 | 0–4 | 1–0 | 4–1 | 2–2 | 1–1 | 1–2 | 0–0 | 1–1 | 1–2 | 0–0 | 0–0 | |

Source: Almanacco Illustrato del Calcio - La Storia 1898-2004, Panini Edizioni, Modena, September 2005 (in Italian)
Legend: Blue = home team win; Yellow = draw; Red = away team win.

== Top goalscorers ==
| Rank | Player | Club | Goals |
|---|---|---|---|
| 1 | (Argentina) (Italy) Antonio Valentín Angelillo | Internazionale | 33 |
| 2 | (Brazil) (Italy) José Altafini | Milan | 28 |
| 3 | (Sweden) Kurt Hamrin | Fiorentina | 26 |
| 4 | (Argentina) (Italy) Miguel Montuori | Fiorentina | 22 |
| 5 | (Italy) Eddie Firmani | Internazionale | 20 |
| 6 | (Wales) John Charles | Juventus | 19 |
| 7 | (Italy) Sergio Brighenti | Padova | 18 |
| 8 | (Italy) Ezio Pascutti | Bologna | 17 |
| 9 | (Sweden) Arne Selmosson | Roma | 16 |
| 9 | (Italy) Giancarlo Danova | Milan | 16 |
| 11 | (Brazil) (Italy) Dino da Costa | Roma | 15 |
| 12 | (Brazil) Humberto Tozzi | Lazio | 14 |
| 12 | (Argentina) (Italy) Francisco Lojacono | Fiorentina | 14 |
| 12 | (Italy) Paolo Barison | Genoa | 14 |
| 12 | (Argentina) (Italy) Omar Sívori | Juventus | 14 |
| 16 | (Italy) Bruno Nicolè | Juventus | 13 |
| 16 | (Italy) Aurelio Milani | Sampdoria | 13 |
| 16 | (Brazil) Emanuele Del Vecchio | Napoli | 13 |
