= Gino Pivatelli =

Italian footballer and manager (1933–2025)

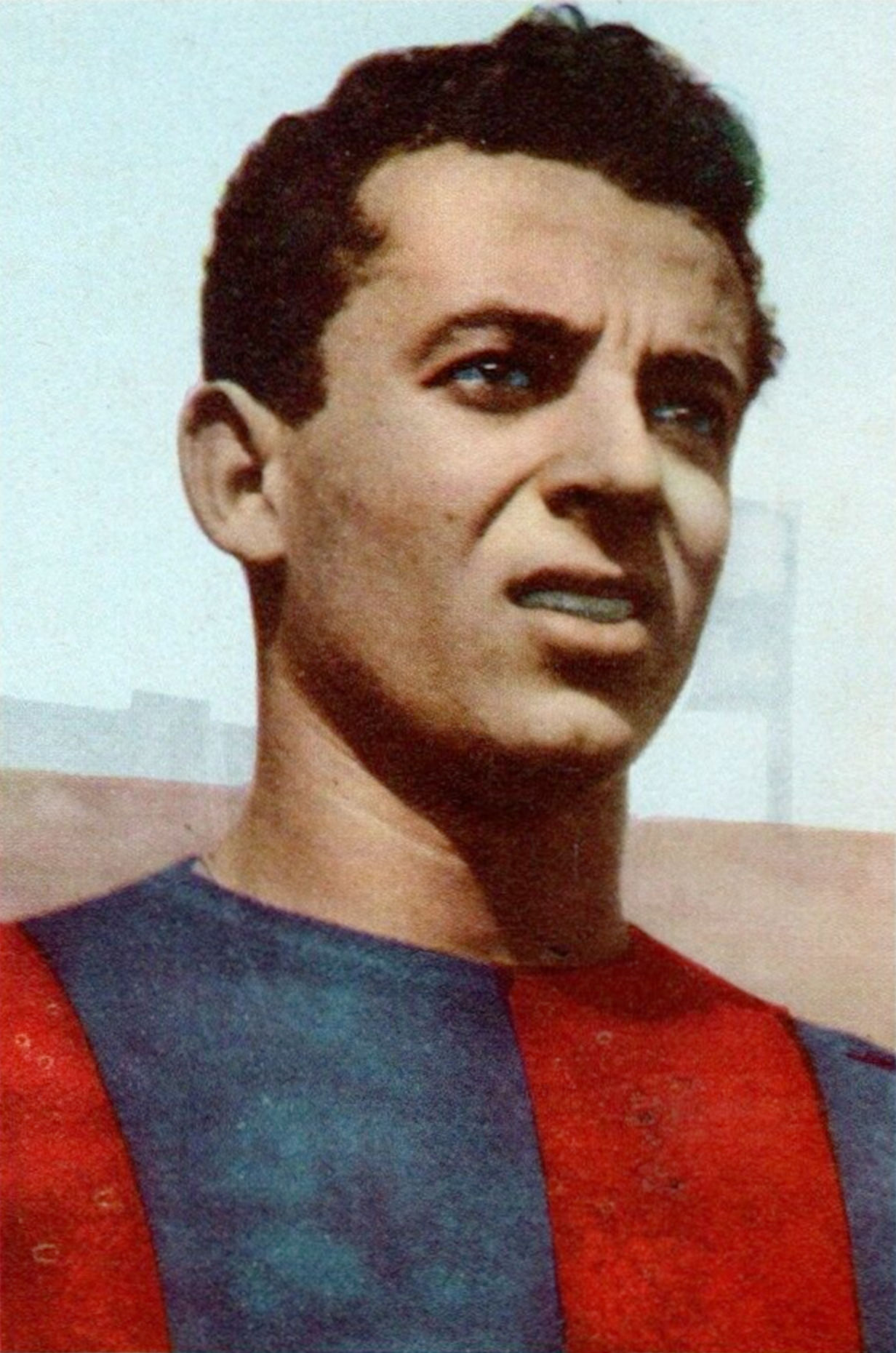
- Pivatelli with Bologna, c. 1958

Personal information
- Date of birth: 27 March 1933
- Place of birth: Sanguinetto, Italy
- Date of death: 17 October 2025 (aged 92)
- Position: Forward

Youth career
- 1947–1949: Inter Milan

Senior career*
Years	Team	Apps	(Gls)
1949–1950	Cerea		
1950–1953	Hellas Verona	68	(25)
1953–1960	Bologna	196	(105)
1960–1961	Napoli	21	(3)
1961–1963	A.C. Milan	37	(11)

International career
1954–1958	Italy	7	(2)

Managerial career
- 1970–1972: Rimini
- 1972–1973: Ravenna
- 1973: Monza
- 1974–1975: Ravenna
- 1976–1977: Pro Vasto
- 1977–1979: Padova
- * Club domestic league appearances and goals

Gino Pivatelli (Italian pronunciation: [ˈdʒiːno pivaˈtɛlli]; 27 March 1933 – 17 October 2025) was an Italian football player and manager who played as a forward.

== Club career ==
Throughout his club career, Pivatelli most notably played for A.C. Milan (1961–63); he also played for Hellas Verona (1950–53), Bologna (1953–60), and Napoli (1960–61). After being ivatelli was acquired by Hellas Verona FC in 1950, with whom he made his Serie B debdropped from the Inter Milan youth side, Put at the age of 17, scoring his first professional goal in his second appearance with the club, in a 4–1 victory over Vicenza. The following season, he was promoted to the starting line-up and scored a total of 25 goals in 68 games for his team during the next three seasons, also helping the struggling club avoid relegation. After joining Bologna in 1953, he made his Serie A debut with the club on 13 September 1953, in a 2–1 home win over Atalanta. With the Emilian side, he was the Serie A top scorer during the 1955–56 Serie A season, with 29 league goals in 30 appearances, and was the only Italian player to win the Capocannoniere title during the 1950s. In total, he scored 105 goals for Bologna during his seven seasons with the club. After playing with Napoli for the 1960–61 season, he joined Milan in 1961, and was part of the side that won the Serie A title in 1962, and the European Cup in 1963 under manager Nereo Rocco, after which he subsequently retired from playing professional football.

== International career ==
Pivatelli was included in Italy for the 1954 FIFA World Cup in Switzerland, although he did not appear during the tournament. He made his senior international debut for Italy on 30 March 1955, at the age of 22, wearing the number 10 shirt, and scoring the match-winning goal in a 2–1 friendly away victory over reigning World Champions West Germany, in Stuttgart. He scored his second international goal against Portugal on 22 December 1957, in a 1958 FIFA World Cup qualifying match. In total, he earned seven caps and scored two goals for the national team between 1954 and 1958.

== Style of play ==
A versatile player, he was primarily deployed as a centre-forward, where he was known for his technical ability and powerful right-footed shot. Throughout his career, he also functioned as a second striker, attacking midfielder, in deeper midfield roles, he was occasionally deployed as a defender, in addition to his usual position of forward.

== Death ==
Pivatelli died on 17 October 2025, at the age of 92. He was the last surviving player from the Italy national team squad in the 1954 FIFA World Cup.

== Honours ==
AC Milan

- Serie A: 1961–62
- European Cup: 1962–63

Individual

- Serie A top goalscorer: 1955–56 (29 goals)
