= Mario Trebbi =

Italian footballer and manager

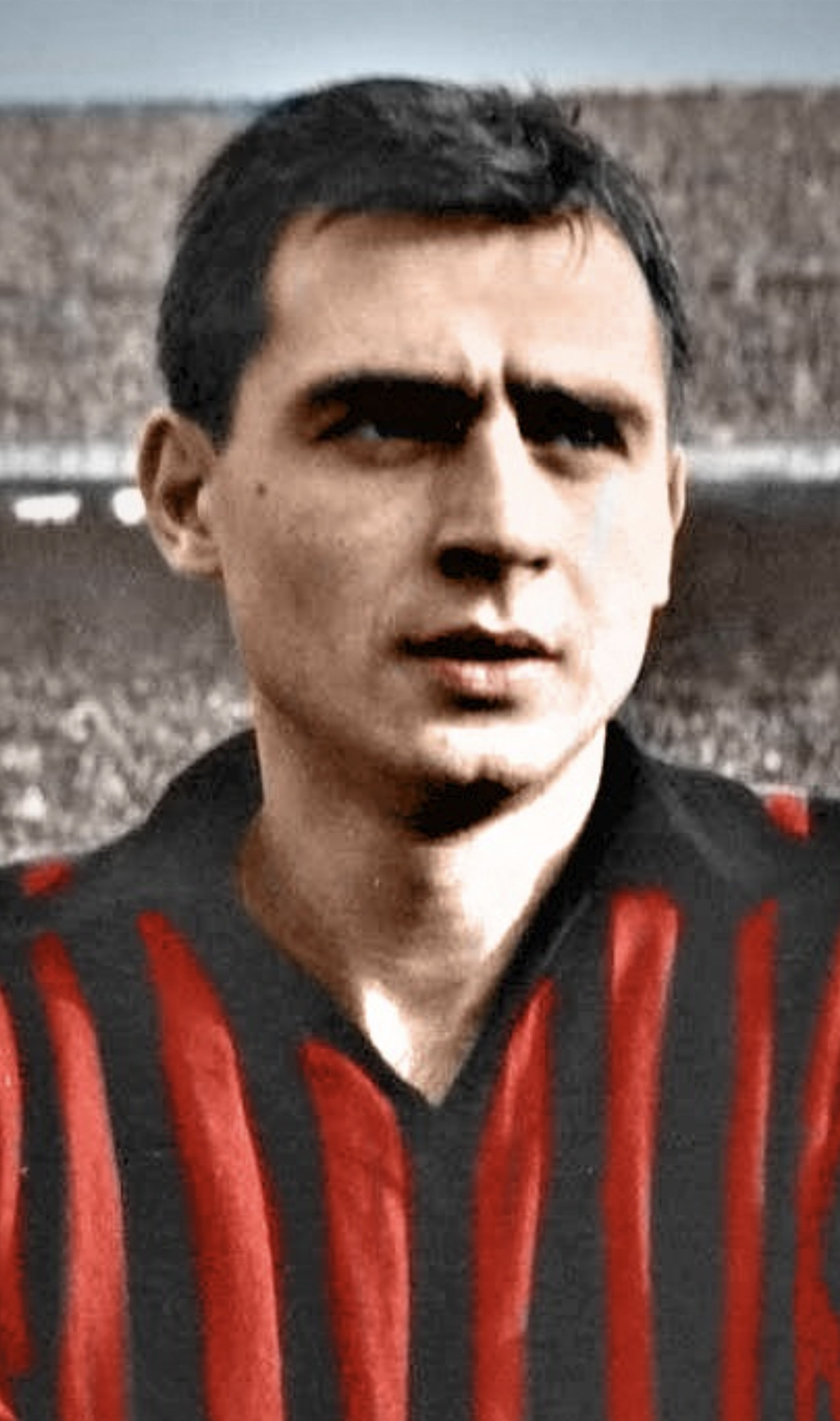

Personal information
- Date of birth: 9 September 1939
- Place of birth: Sesto San Giovanni, Italy
- Date of death: 14 August 2018 (aged 78)
- Height: 1.71 m (5 ft 7 in)
- Position: Defender

Senior career*
Years	Team	Apps	(Gls)
1959–1966	Milan	122	(1)
1966–1969	Torino	35	(0)
1969–1973	Monza	125	(4)

International career
1961–1963	Italy	2	(0)

Managerial career
- 1975–1978: Alessandria
- 1979–1980: Savoia
- 1980–1981: Barletta
- 1981–1982: Savoia
- 1982–1983: Siracusa
- * Club domestic league appearances and goals

Mario Trebbi (Italian pronunciation: [ˈmaːrjo ˈtrebbi]; 9 September 1939 – 14 August 2018) was an Italian football player and coach who played as a defender.

== Club career ==
Trebbi played 10 seasons (157 games, 1 goal) in the Italian Serie A for A.C. Milan and A.C. Torino.

== International career ==
Trebbi earned 2 caps for the Italy national football team and represented Italy at the 1960 Summer Olympics.
