= 1961–62 Serie A =

59th season of top-tier Italian football

Serie A
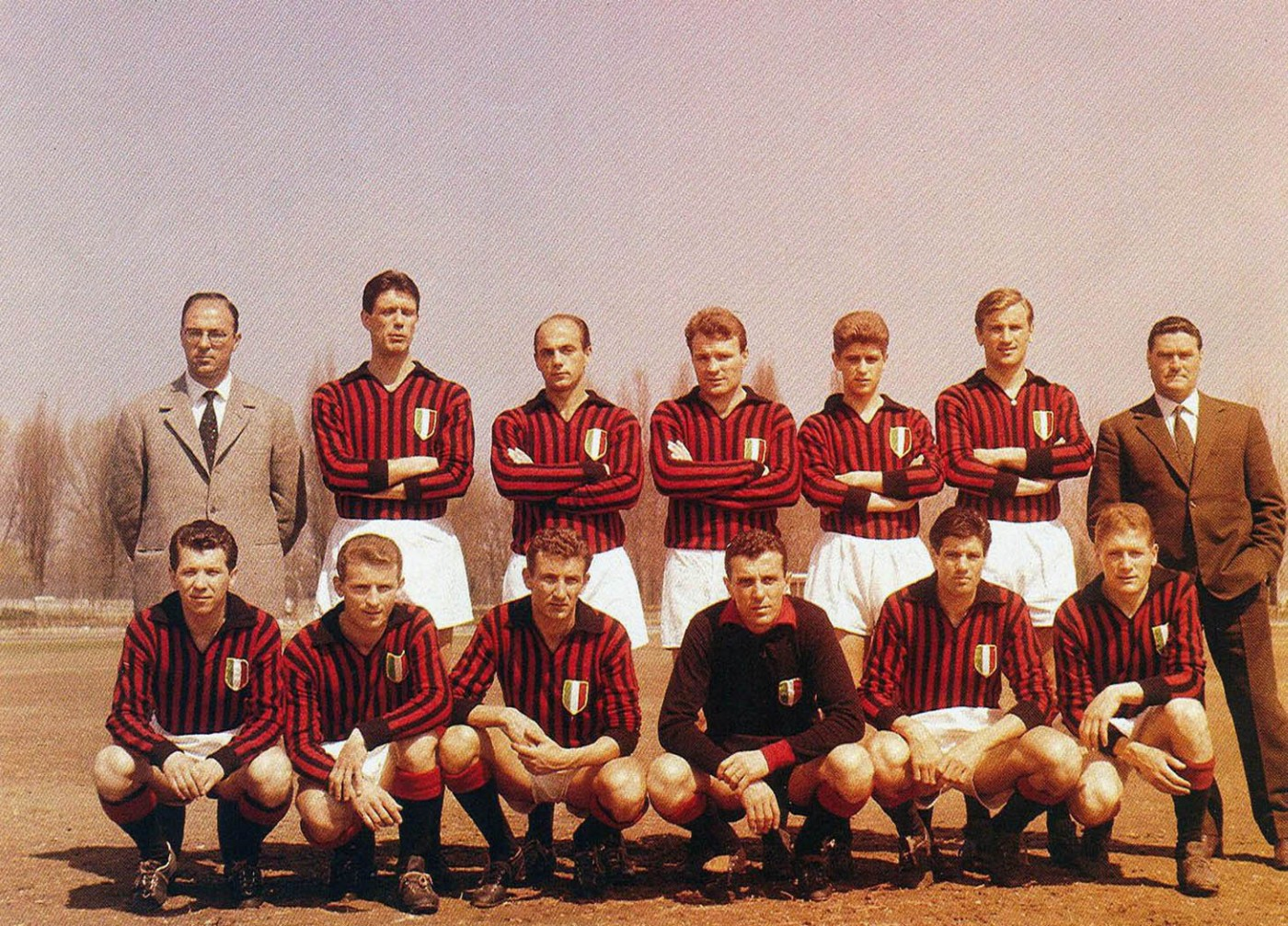
- 1961–62 A.C. Milan team
- Season: 1961–62
- Champions: Milan; 8th title
- Relegated: Padova; Lecco; Udinese
- European Cup: Milan
- Inter-Cities Fairs Cup: Roma; Sampdoria
- Matches: 306
- Goals: 770 (2.52 per match)
- Top goalscorer: José Altafini; Aurelio Milani (22 goals each)

The 1961–62 Serie A season was won by Milan.

Serie A 1961-62 team distribution

== Teams ==
Venezia, Mantova and Palermo had been promoted from Serie B.

== Final classification ==
Pos	Team	Pld	W	D	L	GF	GA	GD	Pts	Qualification or relegation
1	Milan (C)	34	24	5	5	83	36	+47	53	Qualified for the European Cup
2	Internazionale	34	19	10	5	59	31	+28	48	
3	Fiorentina	34	19	8	7	57	32	+25	46	
4	Bologna	34	19	7	8	57	41	+16	45	
5	Roma	34	18	8	8	61	35	+26	44	Invited for the Inter-Cities Fairs Cup
6	Atalanta	34	13	12	9	39	38	+1	38	
7	Torino	34	12	12	10	42	40	+2	36	
8	Palermo	34	13	9	12	30	35	−5	35	
9	Mantova	34	12	8	14	42	42	0	32	
10	Sampdoria	34	9	12	13	32	40	−8	30	Invited for the Inter-Cities Fairs Cup
10	Catania	34	9	12	13	30	45	−15	30	
12	Venezia	34	8	13	13	35	41	−6	29	
12	Juventus	34	10	9	15	48	56	−8	29	
14	Vicenza	34	8	11	15	29	43	−14	27	
14	SPAL	34	9	9	16	30	50	−20	27	
16	Padova (R)	34	7	9	18	29	49	−20	23	Relegated to Serie B
16	Lecco (R)	34	6	11	17	30	53	−23	23	Relegated to Serie B
18	Udinese (R)	34	6	5	23	37	63	−26	17	Relegated to Serie B

Source: Panini
(C) Champions; (R) Relegated

== Results ==
Home \ Away	ATA	BOL	CTN	FIO	INT	JUV	LRV	LCO	MAN	MIL	PAD	PAL	ROM	SAM	SPA	TOR	UDI	VEN
Atalanta		2–1	3–0	0–0	2–3	3–1	0–1	1–1	0–2	0–2	0–0	2–2	0–0	2–0	1–1	2–0	2–1	3–1
Bologna	0–0		3–1	0–3	0–2	2–2	2–0	1–0	3–0	1–0	4–1	1–0	3–1	2–1	2–0	2–1	2–1	1–1
Catania	2–1	1–1		3–1	0–2	2–0	2–0	1–0	2–1	1–3	0–0	0–0	1–1	2–0	0–0	0–1	2–0	1–1
Fiorentina	0–1	1–0	0–0		4–1	1–0	0–1	2–0	1–0	5–2	3–1	2–0	1–1	0–0	5–1	2–0	5–2	2–0
Internazionale	6–0	6–4	1–1	4–1		2–2	2–1	3–0	2–0	1–3	2–1	1–0	0–1	1–1	2–1	0–0	2–0	0–0
Juventus	1–1	2–3	1–0	0–0	2–4		2–0	2–2	1–1	2–4	4–0	2–4	1–0	0–1	2–1	0–1	2–3	1–0
Vicenza	0–1	0–1	3–0	1–1	1–1	1–0		0–0	1–2	0–3	1–0	2–2	0–1	1–1	1–0	1–1	2–2	1–1
Lecco	0–1	2–2	3–1	3–2	0–1	2–2	0–3		1–0	2–2	0–0	2–1	0–1	1–1	0–0	1–1	2–1	4–1
Mantova	3–1	2–5	1–1	0–0	1–1	0–1	1–1	3–0		1–2	1–0	2–0	2–1	2–0	2–0	2–2	2–0	1–0
Milan	2–2	3–0	3–0	5–2	0–2	5–1	4–1	3–0	1–0		4–0	3–0	3–1	2–3	4–1	4–2	4–3	1–0
Padova	1–1	1–2	3–1	1–2	0–2	2–1	2–0	3–1	1–1	1–1		0–0	0–3	1–0	3–2	0–3	4–0	1–1
Palermo	1–0	1–0	0–0	0–1	1–0	0–0	1–0	1–0	1–1	0–0	1–0		0–0	3–1	1–3	1–0	1–3	1–0
Roma	3–1	1–2	4–0	1–0	2–3	3–3	1–1	2–0	4–2	0–1	3–1	5–2		1–0	4–1	2–2	4–0	1–0
Sampdoria	1–1	0–2	4–1	1–3	0–0	2–3	3–0	2–1	1–0	1–3	1–0	0–2	1–0		0–0	2–0	2–2	0–2
SPAL	0–1	1–2	1–0	1–1	1–0	0–3	1–0	0–0	2–1	0–3	2–1	0–2	1–2	1–1		1–0	2–1	1–1
Torino	1–1	2–1	1–1	0–2	0–0	1–3	3–3	2–1	2–1	1–1	1–0	3–0	1–1	0–0	1–0		1–2	4–2
Udinese	1–2	1–1	0–1	2–3	0–1	2–1	0–1	5–1	0–1	0–1	1–0	0–1	1–3	0–0	1–2	1–3		0–0
Venezia	0–1	1–1	2–2	0–1	1–1	3–0	2–0	2–0	4–3	2–1	0–0	1–0	1–3	1–1	2–2	0–1	2–1	

Source: Almanacco Illustrato del Calcio - La Storia 1898-2004, Panini Edizioni, Modena, September 2005 (in Italian)
Legend: Blue = home team win; Yellow = draw; Red = away team win.

== Top goalscorers ==
Rank	Player	Club	Goals
1	(Brazil) (Italy) José Altafini	Milan	22
1	(Italy) Aurelio Milani	Fiorentina	22
3	(England) Gerry Hitchens	Internazionale	16
3	(Italy) Angelo Sormani	Mantova	16
5	(Sweden) Kurt Hamrin	Fiorentina	15
6	(Italy) Beniamino Di Giacomo	Lecco	14
6	(Argentina) Pedro Manfredini	Roma	14
8	(Argentina) (Italy) Omar Sívori	Juventus	13
9	(Italy) Gino Raffin	Venezia	12
10	(Italy) Ezio Pascutti	Bologna	11
10	(Italy) Marino Perani	Bologna	11
10	(Spain) Luis Suárez	Internazionale	11
10	(Italy) Humberto Maschio	Atalanta	11
14	(Italy) Silvano Mencacci	SPAL	10
14	(Scotland) Denis Law	Torino	10
14	(Italy) Gianni Rivera	Milan	10
14	(Italy) Francesco Canella	Udinese	10
14	(Sweden) Torbjörn Jonsson	Fiorentina, Roma	10
14	(Argentina) (Italy) Antonio Valentín Angelillo	Roma	10

== References and sources ==
- Almanacco Illustrato del Calcio - La Storia 1898-2004, Panini Edizioni, Modena, September 2005
