= 1967–68 AC Milan season =

Milan Associazione Calcio
1967–68 season
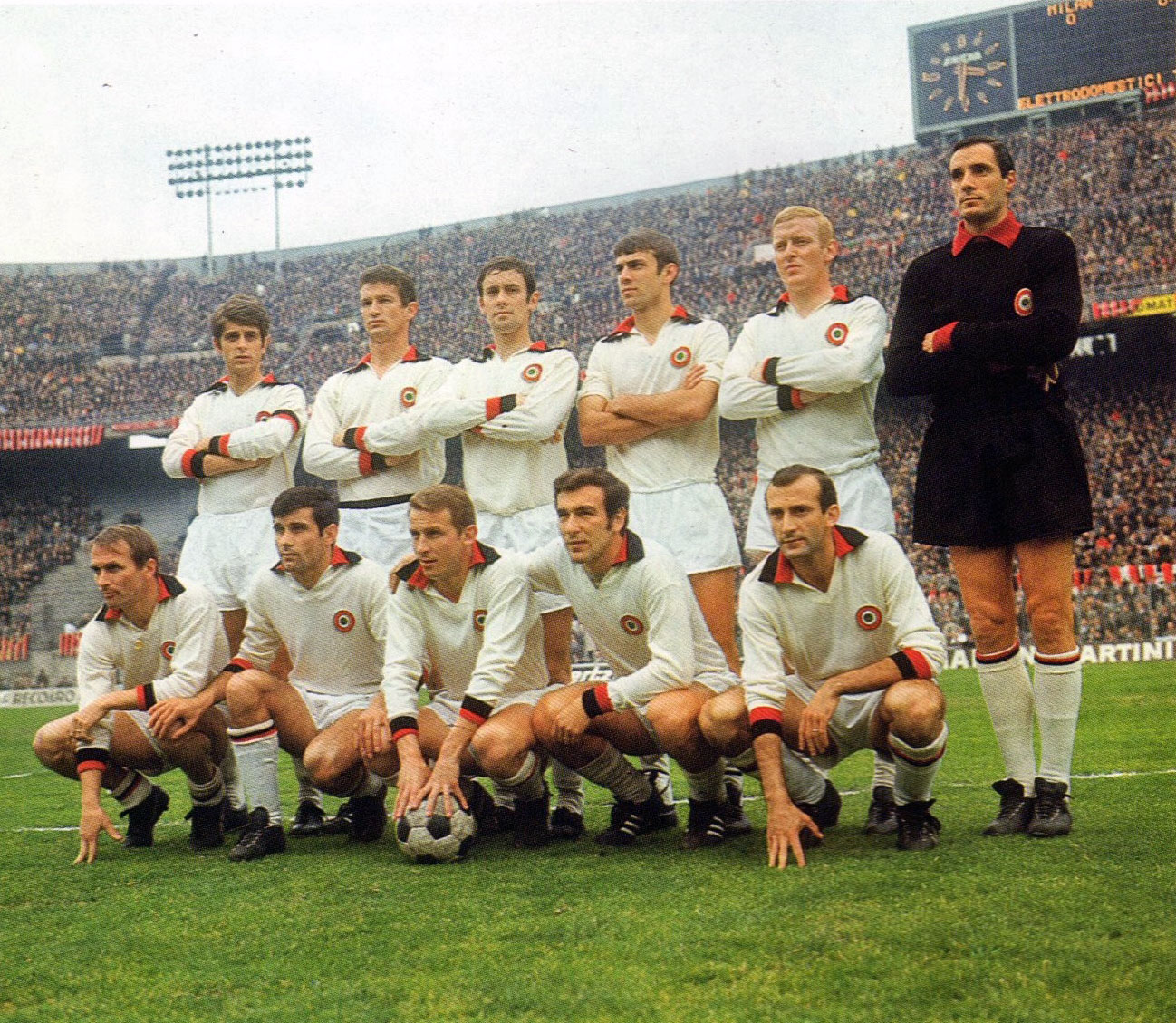
- President: Franco Carraro
- Manager: Nereo Rocco
- Stadium: San Siro
- Serie A: 1st (in European Cup)
- Coppa Italia: Final
- European Cup Winners' Cup: Winners
- Top goalscorer: League: Prati (15); All: Prati (22)
- Average home league attendance: 46,742
Home colours	Away colours

During the 1967–68 season Milan Associazione Calcio competed in Serie A, Coppa Italia and the European Cup Winners' Cup.

== Summary ==
The only time that Milan won the league title so early was back on 31 March 1968. After four titles during the 1950s, the Rossoneri's pace had actually slowed during the following decade as they won just two league titles. However, their second was that of 1968 – a year before their famous European Cup victory. Incidentally, 12 months prior to Milan's Scudetto celebrations in 1968, the prospect of winning the league was unthinkable. Arturo Silvestri's Rossoneri had finished eighth in the league standings, with the only positive being that of our Coppa Italia victory in Rome against Padova on 14 June 1967.

Nereo Rocco returned as manager at the start of the 1967–68 season. Under his leadership, the team altered its tactical approach and lineup. Sormani and Prati got more playing time, Anquilletti became a regular starter, and Rivera, Trapattoni, Rosato and Lodetti took on more prominent roles. The club also signed Cudicini, Schnellinger, Malatrasi and Hamrin. This squad won the Serie A title with four matches remaining in the season, finishing ahead of closest rivals Napoli. Also, AC Milan defeated Hamburg in Rotterdam to win the European Cup Winners' Cup.

== Squad ==
Note: Flags indicate national team as defined under FIFA eligibility rules; some limited exceptions apply. Players may hold more than one non-FIFA nationality.

Pos.	Nation	Player
GK	ITA	Pierangelo Belli
GK	ITA	Fabio Cudicini
GK	ITA	Villiam Vecchi
DF	ITA	Angelo Anquilletti
DF	ITA	Bruno Baveni
DF	ITA	Saul Malatrasi
DF	ITA	Roberto Rosato
DF	ITA	Nello Santin
DF	FRG	Karl-Heinz Schnellinger
DF	ITA	Giovanni Trapattoni
MF	ITA	Massimo Giacomini

Pos.	Nation	Player
MF	ITA	Giovanni Lodetti
MF	ITA	Gianni Rivera (Captain)
MF	ITA	Giorgio Rognoni
MF	ITA	Nevio Scala
FW	ARG	Antonio Valentín Angelillo
FW	ITA	Lino Golin
FW	SWE	Kurt Hamrin
FW	ITA	Bruno Mora
FW	ITA	Pierino Prati
FW	ITA	Angelo Benedicto Sormani

=== Transfers ===
In
Pos.	Name	from	Type
FW	Angelillo	Lecce	–
DF	Sergio Beorchia	Pordenone	–
GK	Fabio Cudicini	Brescia Calcio	–
MF	Lino Golin	Hellas Verona	–
FW	Kurt Hamrin	Fiorentina	–
DF	Saul Malatrasi	Lecce	–
MF	Giorgio Rognoni	Modena	–
MF	Nevio Scala	A.S. Roma	–

Out
Pos.	Name	To	Type
DF	Amarildo	Fiorentina	–
DF	Fausto Daolio	Hellas Verona	–
FW	Renato Faloppa	Arezzo	–
FW	Marco Fazzi	Savona	–
MF	Giuseppe Ferrero	Monza	–
FW	Giuliano Fortunato	Lazio	–
FW	Riccardo Innocenti	Lecce	–
GK	Claudio Mantovani	Bari	–
DF	Gilberto Noletti	Sampdoria	–
FW	Nello Saltutti	Lecce	–

== Competitions ==
=== Serie A ===
==== League table ====
Pos	Team	Pld	W	D	L	GF	GA	GD	Pts	Qualification or relegation
1	Milan (C)	30	18	10	2	53	24	+29	46	Qualification to European Cup
2	Napoli	30	13	11	6	34	24	+10	37	Qualified to Inter-Cities Fairs Cup
3	Juventus	30	13	10	7	33	29	+4	36	Qualified to Inter-Cities Fairs Cup
4	Fiorentina	30	13	9	8	35	23	+12	35	Qualified to Inter-Cities Fairs Cup
5	Internazionale	30	13	7	10	46	34	+12	33	

Source: Panini
(C) Champions

==== Matches ====
24 September 1967 1	SPAL	1–4	Milan	Ferrara
	Brenna 80'		15', 52', 78' Sormani; 53' Hamrin	Stadium: Comunale; Attendance: 23,915; Referee: Gonella

1 October 1967 2	Milan	0–0	Fiorentina	Milan
				Stadium: San Siro; Attendance: 73,008; Referee: Fulvio Pieroni

8 October 1967 3	Napoli	1–1	Milan	Naples
	Cané 32'		43' Hamrin	Stadium: Stadio San Paolo; Attendance: 75,131; Referee: Monti

15 October 1967 4	Milan	3–1	Mantova 1911	Milan
	Mora 5'; Rivera 13', 35' (pen.)		64' Bercellino	Stadium: San Siro; Attendance: 31,336; Referee: Picasso

22 October 1967 5	Inter	1–1	Milan	Milan
	Benitez 58'		78' Rivera	Stadium: San Siro; Attendance: 80,943; Referee: Alessandro D'Agostini

29 October 1967 6	Milan	0–0	Juventus	Milan
				Stadium: San Siro; Attendance: 62,724; Referee: Concetto Lo Bello

5 November 1967 7	Cagliari	2–2	Milan	Cagliari
	Riva 3', 58' (pen.)		38' (o.g.) Longo; 56' Prati	Stadium: Stadio Amsicora; Attendance: 21,807; Referee: Francesco Francescon

12 November 1967 8	Milan	2–0	Sampdoria	Milan
	Sormani 32', 51'			Stadium: San Siro; Attendance: 31,057; Referee: Possagno

26 November 1967 9	Lanerossi	2–2	Milan	Vicenza
	Demarco 27'; Rosato 68' (o.g.)		21', 44' Prati	Stadium: Romeo Menti; Attendance: 20,856; Referee: Fabio Monti

3 December 1967 10	Milan	0–0	Atalanta	Milan
				Stadium: San Siro; Attendance: 41,683; Referee: Vitullo

9 December 1967 11	Brescia	1–2	Milan	Brescia
	D'Alessi 89' (pen.)		68', 86' Prati	Stadium: Mario Rigamonti; Attendance: 30,318; Referee: Mario Bernardis

17 December 1967 12	Torino	2–3	Milan	Turin
	Poletti 25' (pen.); Combin 53'		24', 44' Hamrin; 36' Lodetti	Stadium: Comunale; Attendance: 37,984; Referee: Fabio Monti

31 December 1967 13	Milan	4–2	Bologna	Milan
	Rivera 8'; Sormani 44'; Prati 57', 70'		39' Haller; 83' Tentorio	Stadium: San Siro; Attendance: 35,838; Referee: Antonio Di Tonno

7 January 1968 14	Milan	3–0	Roma	Milan
	Prati 29', 90'; Losi 78' (o.g.)			Stadium: San Siro; Attendance: 52,620; Referee: Gonella

14 January 1968 15	Varese	2–1	Milan	Varese
	Sogliano 27'; Anastasi 53'		79' Sormani	Stadium: Stadio Franco Ossola; Attendance: 25,972; Referee: Francesco Francescon

21 January 1968 16	Milan	3–2	SPAL	Milan
	Sormani 15'; Rivera 66'; Prati 89'		11' Bigon; 19' Bozzao	Stadium: San Siro; Attendance: 29,902; Referee: Paolo Toselli

28 January 1968 17	Fiorentina	0–2	Milan	Florence
			59' Prati; 65' Rivera	Stadium: Comunale; Attendance: 47,466; Referee: Gonella

4 February 1968 18	Milan	2–1	Napoli	Milan
	Rivera 9'; Prati 90'		72' Barison	Stadium: San Siro; Attendance: 61,697; Referee: Fabio Monti

11 February 1968 19	Mantova	0–1	Milan	Mantua
			60' (o.g.) Giagnoni	Stadium: Stadio Danilo Martelli; Attendance: 19,210; Referee: Picasso

18 February 1968 20	Milan	1–1	Inter	Milan
	Hamrin 27'		2' Cappellini	Stadium: San Siro; Attendance: 77,600; Referee: Concetto Lo Bello

25 February 1968 21	Juventus	1–2	Milan	Turin
	Zigoni 22'		14' Prati; 48' Hamrin	Stadium: Comunale; Attendance: 30,704; Referee: Francesco Francescon

3 March 1968 22	Milan	0–1	Cagliari	Milan
			15' Hitchens	Stadium: San Siro; Attendance: 46,974; Referee: Paolo Toselli

10 March 1968 23	Sampdoria	0–3	Milan	Genoa
			56', 72' (pen.) Rivera; 82' Hamrin	Stadium: Stadio Luigi Ferraris; Attendance: 31,936; Referee: Antonio Sbardella

17 March 1968 24	Milan	2–0	Lanerossi	Milan
	Hamrin 16'; Rivera 82'			Stadium: San Siro; Attendance: 33,707; Referee: Francesco De Robbio

24 March 1968 25	Atalanta	0–3	Milan	Bergamo
			18' Sormani; 71', 77' (pen.) Prati	Stadium: Comunale; Attendance: 22,773; Referee: Lattanzi

31 March 1968 26	Milan	1–0	Brescia	Milan
	Rivera 88'			Stadium: San Siro; Attendance: 38,627; Referee: Bruno De Marchi

14 April 1968 27	Milan	2–1	Torino	Milan
	Lodetti 10'; Angelillo 41'		6' Poletti	Stadium: San Siro; Attendance: 53,692; Referee: Concetto Lo Bello

28 April 1968 28	Bologna	1–1	Milan	Bologna
	Guarneri 70'		54' Sormani	Stadium: Comunale; Attendance: 29,534; Referee: Francesco Francescon

5 May 1968 29	Roma	1–1	Milan	Rome
	Taccola 9'		3' Golin	Stadium: Stadio Olimpico; Attendance: 41,383; Referee: Possagno

12 May 1968 30	Milan	1–0	Varese	Milan
	Sormani 29'			Stadium: San Siro; Attendance: 29,620; Referee: Lattanzi

=== Coppa Italia ===
==== First round ====
3 September 1967	Milan	2–0	Cagliari	Milan
	Hamrin 34'; Longoni 39' (o.g.)			Stadium: San Siro; Attendance: 23,000; Referee: Fabio Monti

==== Second round ====
8 November 1967	Varese	1–1 (3–5 p)	Milan	Varese
	Tamborini 89'		37' Rivera	Stadium: Stadio Franco Ossola; Attendance: 2,938; Referee: Ezio Motta
	Penalties
	Anastasi (penalty scored); Anastasi (penalty missed); Vastola (penalty missed); Da Pozzo (penalty scored); Da Pozzo (penalty scored); Da Pozzo (penalty missed)		(penalty scored) Rivera; (penalty scored) Rivera; (penalty scored) Rivera; (penalty scored) Rivera; (penalty missed) Rivera; (penalty scored) Rivera

==== Quarterfinals ====
13 December 1967	Bari	1–1	Milan	Bari
	Muiesan 7'		67' Rivera	Stadium: Stadio della Vittoria; Attendance: 14000; Referee: Giuliano Acernese

17 January 1967	Milan	4–1	Bari	Milan
	Lodetti 22', 46'; Sormani 25'; Rivera 51'		59' Mujesan	Stadium: San Siro; Attendance: 3,005; Referee: Alessandro Canova

==== Final round ====
13 June 1968 1	Torino	0–0	Milan	Turin
				Stadium: Comunale; Attendance: 11,460; Referee: Antonio Sbardella

16 June 1968 2	Inter	0–0	Milan	Milan
				Stadium: San Siro; Attendance: 43,030; Referee: Fabio Monti

19 June 1968 3	Milan	2–1	Bologna	Milan
	Prati 42'; Sormani 89'		7' Pace	Stadium: San Siro; Attendance: 12,593; Referee: Aurelio Angonese

23 June 1968 4	Milan	1–1	Torino	Milan
	Prati 6'		86' Facchin	Stadium: San Siro; Attendance: 14,817; Referee: Antonio Di Tonno

26 June 1968 5	Milan	4–2	Inter	Milan
	Sormani 30'; Hamrin 52'; Schnellinger 78'; Rosato 86'		3' Nielsen; 66' Achilli	Stadium: San Siro; Attendance: 56,198; Referee: Mario Bernardis

30 June 1968 6	Bologna	2–1	Milan	Bologna
	Schnellinger 46' (o.g.); Turra 88'		61' Prati	Stadium: Comunale; Attendance: 8,481; Referee: Concetto Lo Bello

=== European Cup Winners' Cup ===
==== Round of 32 ====
20 September 1967	Milan	5–1	(Bulgaria) Levski Sofia	Milan
	Sormani 51'; Hamrin 53', 70'; Anquilletti 83', 86'		63' Asparuhov	Stadium: San Siro; Attendance: 39,720; Referee: (Socialist Federal Republic of Yugoslavia) Zečević

11 October 1967	(Bulgaria) Levski Sofia	1–1	Milan	Sofia
	Asparuhov 74'		11' Sormani	Stadium: Stadio Nazionale Vasil Levski; Attendance: 45,000; Referee: (Turkey) Faruk Talu

==== Eightfinals ====
22 November 1967	(Hungary) Gyori ETO	2–2	Milan	Győr
	Gyorffi 29', 80'		19', 81' Sormani	Stadium: Stadion ETO; Attendance: 20,000; Referee: (Switzerland) Gottfried Dienst

7 December 1967	Milan	1–1	(Hungary) Gyori ETO	Milan
	Prati 22'		6' Szalo	Stadium: San Siro; Attendance: 17,754; Referee: (Austria) Helmut

==== Quarterfinals ====
28 February 1968	(Belgium) Standard Liège	1–1	Milan	Liège
	Claessen 33'		20' Prati	Stadium: Sclessin Stadion; Attendance: 37,000; Referee: (Hungary) Zslot

13 March 1968	Milan	1–1	(Belgium) Standard Liège	Milan
	Rognoni 40'		73' Jurkiewicz	Stadium: San Siro; Attendance: 58,145; Referee: (France) Barde

20 March 1968 replay	Milan	2–0	(Belgium) Standard Liège	Milan
	Prati 2'; Rivera 48'			Stadium: San Siro; Attendance: 40,112; Referee: (France) Barde

==== Semifinals ====
1 May 1968	Milan	2–0	(Germany) Bayern München	Milan
	Sormani 51'; Prati 74'			Stadium: San Siro; Attendance: 69,577; Referee: (Spain) Gracia

8 May 1968	(Germany) Bayern München	0–0	Milan	München
				Stadium: Grünwalder Stadion; Attendance: 42,000; Referee: (Switzerland) Gottfried Dienst

==== Final ====
23 May 1968	Hamburg SV (Germany)	0–2	Milan	Rotterdam
			Hamrin 3', 19'	Stadium: Feijenoord Stadion; Attendance: 50,000; Referee: (Spain) Ortiz de Mendibil

== Statistics ==
=== Squad statistics ===
Competition	Points	Home						Away						Total						GD
Competition	Points	G	W	D	L	Gs	Ga	G	W	D	L	Gs	Ga	G	W	D	L	Gs	Ga	GD
1967-68 Serie A	46	15	10	4	1	24	9	15	8	6	1	29	15	30	18	10	2	53	24	+29
1967-68 Coppa Italia	–	5	4	1	0	13	5	5	0	4	1	3	4	10	4	5	1	16	9	+7
1967-68 European Cup Winners' Cup	–	6	4	2	0	16	3	4	0	4	0	4	4	10	4	6	0	17	7	+10
Total	–	26	18	7	1	40	17	24	8	14	2	36	23	50	26	21	3	86	40	+46

=== Players statistics ===
No.	Pos	Nat	Player	Total		Serie A		Coppa Italia		Cup Winners' Cup	
No.	Pos	Nat	Player	Apps	Goals	Apps	Goals	Apps	Goals	Apps	Goals
	DF	(Italy) ITA	Angelo Anquilletti	50	2	30	0	10	0	10	2
	DF	(Italy) ITA	Bruno Baveni	7	0	4	0	2	0	1	0
	GK	(Italy) ITA	Pierangelo Belli	19	-19	12	-13	4	-2	3	-4
	FW	(Argentina) ARG	Antonio Valentin Angelillo	9	1	3	1	6	0	0	0
	GK	(Italy) ITA	Fabio Cudicini	32	-21	18	-11	7	-7	7	-3
	MF	(Italy) ITA	Massimo Giacomini	4	0	1	0	3	0	0	0
	FW	(Italy) ITA	Lino Golin	10	1	4	1	6	0	0	0
	FW	(Sweden) SWE	Kurt Hamrin	39	14	23	8	8	2	8	4
	MF	(Italy) ITA	Giovanni Lodetti	49	4	29	2	10	2	10	0
	DF	(Italy) ITA	Saul Malatrasi	40	0	28	0	4	0	8	0
	FW	(Italy) ITA	Bruno Mora	13	1	9	1	3	0	1	0
	FW	(Italy) ITA	Pierino Prati	38	22	23	15	7	3	8	4
	MF	(Italy) ITA	Gianni Rivera	44	15	29	11	5	3	10	1
	MF	(Italy) ITA	Giorgio Rognoni	11	1	2	0	6	0	3	1
	DF	(Italy) ITA	Roberto Rosato	47	1	28	0	9	1	10	0
	DF	(Italy) ITA	Nello Santin	1	0	0	0	1	0	0	0
	MF	(Italy) ITA	Nevio Scala	10	0	7	0	0	0	3	0
	DF	(Germany) GER	Karl-Heinz Schnellinger	46	1	27	0	9	1	10	0
	FW	(Italy) ITA	Angelo Benedicto Sormani	48	19	29	11	10	3	9	5
	MF	(Italy) ITA	Giovanni Trapattoni	42	0	24	0	9	0	9	0
	GK	(Italy) ITA	Villiam Vecchi	1	0	1	0	0	0	0	0

== See also ==
- A.C. Milan
