= 1966–67 AC Milan season =

Milan Associazione Calcio
1966–67 season
- President: Luigi Carraro
- Manager: Arturo Silvestri
- Stadium: San Siro
- Serie A: 8th
- Coppa Italia: Winners
- Mitropa Cup: Round of 16
- Cup of the Alps: 6º
- Top goalscorer: League: Gianni Rivera (12); All: Gianni Rivera (19)
- Average home league attendance: 33,382
Home colours	Away colours

During the 1966–67 season Milan Associazione Calcio competed in Serie A, Coppa Italia, Mitropa Cup and Cup of the Alps.

== Summary ==
The new manager of AC Milan for the 1966-67 season was former Rossoneri player Arturo Silvestri. The main signings of the summer transfer market session were defenders Roberto Rosato and Angelo Anquilletti, as well as forward Pierino Prati, while club's legend Cesare Maldini left the club after twelve seasons.

The main achievement of the season was the victory of the Coppa Italia, the first in Milan's history, which gave the club the opportunity to participate in the 1967-68 Cup Winners' Cup the following season. The trophy was achieved by eliminating Pisa, Modena and Torino in the first elimination matches, Lecco in the quarter-finals and Juventus in the semifinals, and beating Padova 1-0 in the final thanks to a goal from Amarildo. Gianni Rivera was the top scorer of the competition, with seven goals. In the Serie A, Milan concluded in eighth place in the final standings (the worst performance of the decade), while in the Mitropa Cup they were eliminated in the round of 16 by Dinamo Zagreb.

In 1966 AC Milan moved its headquarters from Palazzo Castiglioni in Corso Venezia, Milan, to via Filippo Turati 3, in a building that retain this function until 2014, when Casa Milan was inaugurated, as new headquarters of the club.

== Squad ==
Note: Flags indicate national team as defined under FIFA eligibility rules; some limited exceptions apply. Players may hold more than one non-FIFA nationality.

Pos.	Nation	Player
GK	ITA	Pierangelo Belli
GK	ITA	Mario Barluzzi
GK	ITA	Claudio Mantovani
DF	ITA	Angelo Anquilletti
DF	ITA	Bruno Baveni
DF	ITA	Alberto Giacomin
DF	ITA	Gilberto Noletti
DF	ITA	Roberto Rosato
DF	ITA	Nello Santin
DF	FRG	Karl-Heinz Schnellinger
DF	ITA	Giovanni Trapattoni (vice-captain)
MF	ITA	Massimo Giacomini
MF	ARG	Luis César Carniglia
MF	ITA	Giuseppe Ferrero

Pos.	Nation	Player
MF	ITA	Giovanni Lodetti
MF	ITA	Sergio Maddè
MF	ITA	Gianni Rivera (Captain)
MF	ITA	Bruno Bacchetta
MF	ITA	Nevio Scala
FW	BRA	Amarildo
FW	ITA	Marco Fazzi
FW	ITA	Giuliano Fortunato
FW	ITA	Bruno Mora
FW	ITA	Riccardo Innocenti
FW	ITA	Angelo Paina
FW	ITA	Nello Saltutti
FW	ITA	Pierino Prati
FW	ITA	Angelo Benedicto Sormani

=== Transfers ===
In
Pos.	Name	from	Type
DF	Angelo Anquilletti	Atalanta	-
MF	Bruno Bacchetta	Genoa	-
DF	Bruno Baveni	Genoa	-
GK	Pierangelo Belli	Lecco	-
MF	Luis César Carniglia	Sampdoria	-
FW	Marco Fazzi	Savona	-
MF	Giuseppe Ferrero	Monza	-
MF	Massimo Giacomini	Brescia	-
FW	Riccardo Innocenti	SPAL	-
FW	Pierino Prati	Salernitana	-
DF	Roberto Rosato	Torino	-

Out
Pos.	Name	To	Type
FW	Antonio Angelillo	Lecco	-
GK	Luigi Balzarini	Lecco	-
MF	Alberto Grossetti	Lecco	-
GK	Mario Liberalato	Mestrina	-
DF	Luigi Maldera	Verona	-
DF	Cesare Maldini	Torino	-
MF	Ambrogio Pelagalli	Atalanta	-
MF	Nevio Scala	Roma	-
DF	Mario Trebbi	Torino	-
FW	Pierino Prati	Savona	-

== Competitions ==
=== Serie A ===
==== League table ====
Pos	Team	Pld	W	D	L	GF	GA	GD	Pts	Qualification or relegation
6	Cagliari	34	13	14	7	35	17	+18	40	
7	Torino	34	10	18	6	33	26	+7	38	
8	Milan	34	11	15	8	36	32	+4	37	Qualification to Cup Winners' Cup
9	Mantova	34	6	22	6	22	23	−1	34	
10	Roma	34	11	11	12	35	39	−4	33	

Source: Panini

==== Matches ====
18 September 1966 1	Milan	2–1	Venezia	Milan
	Rivera 4'; Lodetti 64'		62' F. Mazzola	Stadium: Stadio San Siro; Attendance: 37,845; Referee: Di Tonno

25 September 1966 2	Cagliari	0–0	Milan	Cagliari
				Stadium: Stadio Amsicora; Attendance: 25,981; Referee: Lo Bello

2 October 1966 3	Milan	2–2	Mantova	Milan
	Fortunato 2'; Amarildo 37'		7' Catalano; 59' Di Giacomo	Stadium: Stadio San Siro; Attendance: 30,867; Referee: Marengo

9 October 1966 4	Napoli	3–2	Milan	Naples
	Orlando 12', 53'; Bianchi 28'		49' (pen.) Rivera; 69' Amarildo	Stadium: Stadio San Paolo; Attendance: 81,688; Referee: Lo Bello

16 October 1966 5	Milan	2–2	Lazio	Milan
	Rosato 52'; Rivera 85'		27', 88' Bagatti	Stadium: Stadio San Siro; Attendance: 25,337; Referee: Angonese

23 October 1966 6	Vicenza	1–1	Milan	Vicenza
	Rossetti 79'		38' Rivera	Stadium: Stadio Romeo Menti; Attendance: 12,003; Referee: Pieroni

6 November 1966 7	Milan	3–1	Foggia	Milan
	Fortunato 10', 24'; Rivera 32' (pen.)		55' (pen.) Micheli	Stadium: Stadio San Siro; Attendance: 18,470; Referee: De Marchi

13 November 1966 8	Brescia	0–0	Milan	Brescia
				Stadium: Stadio Mario Rigamonti; Attendance: 28,955; Referee: Monti

20 November 1966 9	Milan	0–1	Inter Milan	Milan
			74' (o.g.) Maddè	Stadium: Stadio San Siro; Attendance: 68,925; Referee: Lo Bello

4 December 1966 10	Milan	0–2	Fiorentina	Milan
			20' Hamrin; 45' Brugnera	Stadium: Stadio San Siro; Attendance: 27,465; Referee: Francescon

11 December 1966 11	SPAL	1–1	Milan	Ferrara
	Bosdaves 42'		87' Maddè	Stadium: Stadio Comunale; Attendance: 9,759; Referee: Angonese

18 December 1966 12	Milan	0–0	Atalanta	Milan
				Stadium: Stadio San Siro; Attendance: 20,162; Referee: Vitullo

24 December 1966 13	Juventus	1–1	Milan	Turin
	De Paoli 80'		34' (o.g.) Castano	Stadium: Stadio Comunale; Attendance: 35,630; Referee: Pieroni

31 December 1966 14	Roma	0–1	Milan	Rome
			76' Rivera	Stadium: Stadio Olimpico; Attendance: 59,110; Referee: Monti

8 January 1967 15	Milan	1–1	Torino	Milan
	Rivera 39'		20' Simoni	Stadium: Stadio San Siro; Attendance: 32,437; Referee: Di Tonno

15 January 1967 16	Milan	1–1	Bologna	Milan
	Saltutti 41'		48' Haller	Stadium: Stadio San Siro; Attendance: 37,156; Referee: Pieroni

22 January 1967 17	Lecco	1–1	Milan	Lecco
	Azzimonti 34'		26' (rig) Rivera	Stadium: Stadio Mario Rigamonti; Attendance: 10,519; Referee: Lo Bello

29 January 1967 18	Venezia	1–2	Milan	Venice
	Dori 73'		57', 70' Sormani	Stadium: Stadio Pierluigi Penzo; Attendance: 17,799; Referee: Gonella

5 February 1967 19	Milan	2–1	Cagliari	Milan
	Sormani 31'; Rivera 74'		76' (pen.) Riva	Stadium: Stadio San Siro; Attendance: 39,580; Referee: Angonese

12 February 1967 20	Mantova	1–0	Milan	Mantova
	Volpi 53'			Stadium: Stadio Danilo Martelli; Attendance: 22,896; Referee: Gonella

19 February 1967 21	Milan	1–0	Napoli	Milan
	Rivera 77'			Stadium: Stadio San Siro; Attendance: 40,546; Referee: De Marchi

26 February 1967 22	Lazio	0–0	Milan	Rome
				Stadium: Stadio Olimpico; Attendance: 25,639; Referee: Francescon

5 March 1967 23	Milan	2–0	Vicenza	Milan
	Rivera 86'; Innocenti 88'			Stadium: Stadio San Siro; Attendance: 24,956; Referee: Monti

12 March 1967 24	Foggia	0–2	Milan	Foggia
			16' (o.g.) Rinaldi	Stadium: Stadio Pino Zaccheria; Attendance: 14,679; Referee: Sbardella

19 March 1967 25	Milan	0–1	Brescia	Milan
			55' Salvi	Stadium: Stadio San Siro; Attendance: 27,811; Referee: De Robbio

2 April 1967 26	Inter Milan	4–0	Milan	Milan
	Cappellini 18'; Facchetti 71'; Suarez 74'; Domenghini 84'			Stadium: Stadio San Siro; Attendance: 76,906; Referee: Pieroni

9 April 1967 27	Fiorentina	1–0	Milan	Florence
	De Sisti 34'			Stadium: Stadio Comunale; Attendance: 22,763; Referee: Sbardella

16 April 1967 28	Milan	2–0	SPAL	Milan
	Mora 19', 58'			Stadium: Stadio San Siro; Attendance: 21,847; Referee: Gonella

23 April 1967 29	Atalanta	0–0	Milan	Bergamo
				Stadium: Stadio Comunale; Attendance: 14,309; Referee: Monti

30 April 1967 30	Milan	3–1	Juventus	Milan
	Sormani 30'; Rosato 34'; Lodetti 63'		25' Menichelli	Stadium: Stadio San Siro; Attendance: 62,110; Referee: Francescon

7 May 1967 31	Milan	3–1	Roma	Milan
	Mora 10'; Rivera 13'; Lodetti 52'		64' Peirò	Stadium: Stadio San Siro; Attendance: 27,003; Referee: Toselli

14 May 1967 32	Torino	0–0	Milan	Turin
				Stadium: Stadio Comunale; Attendance: 20,657; Referee: Acernese

21 May 1967 33	Bologna	2–0	Milan	Bologna
	Pascutti 63'; Vastola 70'			Stadium: Stadio Comunale; Attendance: 25,773; Referee: Angonese

28 May 1967 34	Milan	1–1	Lecco	Milan
	Mora 46'		61' Schiavo	Stadium: Stadio San Siro; Attendance: 17,087; Referee: Palazzo

=== Coppa Italia ===
4 September 1966 First round	Pisa	0–3	Milan	Pisa
			40' Rivera; 43' Schnellinger; 66' Amarildo	Stadium: Stadio Arena Garibaldi; Attendance: 12,000; Referee: Gonella

2 November 1966 Second round	Milan	5–2 (a.e.t.)	Modena	Verona
	Rivera 44', 83' (pen.), 103', 118'; Lodetti 102'		17' Rognoni; 69' Console	Stadium: Stadio Marcantonio Bentegodi; Attendance: 5,000; Referee: Bigi

1 March 1967 Third round	Milan	4–2	Torino	Milan
	Sormani 5'; Rivera 11', 21'; Fortunato 51'		46', 86' (pen.) Facchin	Stadium: Stadio San Siro; Attendance: 4,039; Referee: Bigi

4 May 1967 Quarter-final	Lecco	1–2	Milan	Lecco
	Bonfanti 63'		35' Sormani; 68' Lodetti	Stadium: Stadio Mario Rigamonti; Attendance: 6,775; Referee: Gussoni

7 June 1967 Semi-final	Juventus	1–2 (a.e.t.)	Milan	Turin
	Del Sol 37'		9' Mora; 115' Amarildo	Stadium: Stadio Comunale; Attendance: 22,406; Referee: Di Tonno

14 June 1967 Final	Milan	1–0	Padova	Rome
	Amarildo 49'			Stadium: Stadio Olimpico; Attendance: 7,405; Referee: Bernardis

=== Cup of the Alps ===
17 June 1967 1	Servette FC	0–0	Milan	Geneva
				Stadium: Charmilles Stadium; Attendance: 12,579; Referee: ?

21 June 1967 2	1860 Munich	0–0	Milan	Munich
				Stadium: Grünwalder Stadion; Attendance: 10,000; Referee: Yakobi

24 June 1967 3	Eintracht Frankfurt	1–0	Milan	Frankfurt
	Grabowski 12'			Stadium: Waldstadion; Attendance: 14,000; Referee: Rademacher

27 June 1967 4	FC Basel	0–3	Milan	Basel
			24' (o.g.) Odermatt; 67' Fortunato; 69' Trapattoni	Stadium: St. Jakob Stadium; Attendance: 11,400; Referee: Scheurer

30 June 1967 5	FC Zürich	2–0	Milan	Zürich
	Stürmer 51'; Künzli 62'			Stadium: Letzigrund; Attendance: 8,800; Referee: Grassi

=== Mitropa Cup ===
==== Round of 16 ====
23 November 1966 1	Dinamo Zagreb	1–0	Milan	Zagreb
	Zambata 55'			Stadium: Stadion Maksimir; Attendance: 18,000; Referee: Sep

30 November 1966 2	Milan	0–0	Dinamo Zagreb	Milan
				Stadium: Stadio San Siro; Attendance: 6,925; Referee: Placek

== Statistics ==
=== Squad statistics ===
Competition	Points	Home						Away						Total						GD
Competition	Points	G	W	D	L	Gs	Ga	G	W	D	L	Gs	Ga	G	W	D	L	Gs	Ga	GD
1966-67 Serie A	37	17	8	6	3	25	16	17	3	9	5	11	16	34	11	5	8	36	32	+4
1966-67 Coppa Italia	–	3	3	0	0	10	4	3	3	0	0	7	2	6	6	0	0	17	6	+11
1966-67 Mitropa Cup	–	1	0	1	0	0	0	1	0	0	1	0	1	2	0	1	1	0	1	-1
1967 Cup of the Alps	4	0	0	0	0	0	0	5	1	2	2	3	3	5	1	2	2	3	3	0
Total	–	21	11	7	3	35	20	26	7	11	8	21	22	47	18	18	11	56	42	+14

=== Players statistics ===
No.	Pos	Nat	Player	Total		Serie A		Coppa Italia		Cup of the Alps		Mitropa Cup	
No.	Pos	Nat	Player	Apps	Goals	Apps	Goals	Apps	Goals	Apps	Goals	Apps	Goals
	DF	(Italy) ITA	Angelo Anquilletti	38	0	28	0	5	0	4	0	1	0
	DF	(Italy) ITA	Alberto Giacomin	1	0	0	0	0	0	1	0	0	0
	DF	(Italy) ITA	Bruno Baveni	14	0	6	0	2	0	5	0	1	0
	DF	(Italy) ITA	Gilberto Noletti	17	0	14	0	2	0	0	0	1	0
	GK	(Italy) ITA	Pierangelo Belli	14	-8	8	-6	3	-2	3	0	0	0
	FW	(Brazil) BRA	Amarildo	32	5	25	2	5	3	0	0	2	0
	GK	(Italy) ITA	Mario Barluzzi	25	-22	19	-16	1	-2	3	-3	2	-1
	MF	(Italy) ITA	Massimo Giacomini	5	0	0	0	0	0	5	0	0	0
	MF	(Italy) ITA	Giuseppe Ferrero	1	0	0	0	0	0	1	0	0	0
	FW	(Italy) ITA	Marco Fazzi	2	0	0	0	0	0	2	0	0	0
	FW	(Italy) ITA	Riccardo Innocenti	18	1	14	1	1	0	3	0	0	0
	FW	(Italy) ITA	Sergio Maddè	29	1	21	1	3	0	3	0	2	0
	FW	(Italy) ITA	Giuliano Fortunato	28	5	16	3	6	1	5	1	1	0
	MF	(Italy) ITA	Giovanni Lodetti	42	5	33	3	6	2	2	0	1	0
	MF	(Argentina) ARG	Luis César Carniglia	3	0	0	0	1	0	2	0	0	0
	FW	(Italy) ITA	Bruno Mora	19	5	11	4	3	1	4	0	1	0
	FW	(Italy) ITA	Pierino Prati	2	0	2	0	0	0	0	0	0	0
	MF	(Italy) ITA	Gianni Rivera	43	19	34	12	6	7	1	0	2	0
	MF	(Italy) ITA	Bruno Bacchetta	1	0	0	0	0	0	0	0	1	0
	DF	(Italy) ITA	Roberto Rosato	42	2	33	2	5	0	3	0	1	0
	DF	(Italy) ITA	Nello Santin	41	0	32	0	5	0	2	0	2	0
	MF	(Italy) ITA	Nevio Scala	1	0	0	0	0	0	1	0	0	0
	DF	(Germany) GER	Karl-Heinz Schnellinger	40	1	28	0	5	1	5	0	2	0
	FW	(Italy) ITA	Angelo Benedicto Sormani	23	6	18	4	3	2	0	0	2	0
	FW	(Italy) ITA	Angelo Paina	1	0	0	0	0	0	1	0	0	0
	FW	(Italy) ITA	Nello Saltutti	2	1	2	1	0	0	0	0	0	0
	MF	(Italy) ITA	Giovanni Trapattoni	33	1	23	0	5	0	5	1	0	0
	GK	(Italy) ITA	Claudio Mantovani	9	-12	7	-10	2	-2	0	0	0	0

== See also ==
- AC Milan

== Bibliography ==
- Almanacco illustrato del Milan, ed: 2, March 2005. Panini.
- Enrico Tosi. La storia del Milan, May 2005. Italia/Italy cid Tosi.
- Milan. Sempre con te, December 2009. Mondadori. 2009. ISBN 978-88-04-59118-4.
