= 1968–69 AC Milan season =

Milan Associazione Calcio
1968–69 season
- President: Franco Carraro
- Manager: Nereo Rocco
- Stadium: San Siro
- Serie A: 2nd
- Coppa Italia: Quarter-finals
- European Cup: Winners (in European Cup)
- Top goalscorer: League: Pierino Prati (14); All: Prati (21)
- Highest home attendance: 80,119 (vs Manchester United 23 April 1969)
- Average home league attendance: 48,403
Home colours	Away colours

During the 1968–69 season Milan Associazione Calcio competed in Serie A, Coppa Italia and European Cup.

== Summary ==
For the season the club office confirmed Nereo Rocco as manager. In June 1968, Anquilletti, Lodetti, Prati, Rivera e Rosato became European champions with National Team winners of UEFA Euro 1968. Loan in Romano Fogli and return Luigi Maldera after 2 years of loan out.

In league the squad competed against Cagliari and Fiorentina in the race of the trophy. In quarterfinals of Coppa Italia Torino, defeated Milan 1–0 both games.

In European Cup the squad reached the Final after defeated in Round of 32 Malmö FF (lost 1–2 at Malmö and won 4–1 in Milan), The team did not play the Eightfinals due to Eastern European teams abandoned the tournament, qualifying to the Quarterfinals now to match against Celtic Glasgow (draw 0–0 in Home and 1–0 won away), in semifinals the club defeated English squad Manchester United champions last year (won 2–0 at San Siro and lost 1–0 at Old Trafford), including stars such as George Best and World Cup champion Bobby Charlton.

Final of the Euro tournament was disputed on 28 May 1969 in Madrid against Netherlands' club Ajax won by Milan with a 4–1 thanks to a hat-trick of Pierino Prati and 1 goal of Sormani after rivals scored by penalty on Vasović. The club clinched its second title ever.

== Squad ==
Note: Flags indicate national team as defined under FIFA eligibility rules; some limited exceptions apply. Players may hold more than one non-FIFA nationality.

Pos.	Nation	Player
GK	ITA	Pierangelo Belli
GK	ITA	Fabio Cudicini
GK	ITA	Claudio Mantovani
GK	ITA	Villiam Vecchi
DF	ITA	Angelo Anquilletti
DF	ITA	Bruno Baveni
DF	ITA	Saul Malatrasi
DF	ITA	Luigi Maldera
DF	ITA	Paolo Montanari
DF	ITA	Roberto Rosato
DF	ITA	Nello Santin
DF	GER	Karl-Heinz Schnellinger
MF	ITA	Roberto Casone

Pos.	Nation	Player
MF	ITA	Romano Fogli
MF	ITA	Giovanni Lodetti
MF	ITA	Gianni Rivera (Captain)
MF	ITA	Giorgio Rognoni
MF	ITA	Nevio Scala
MF	ITA	Giovanni Trapattoni (vice-captain)
FW	ITA	Lino Golin
FW	SWE	Kurt Hamrin
FW	ITA	Angelo Marchi
FW	ITA	Bruno Mora
FW	ITA	Carlo Petrini
FW	ITA	Pierino Prati
FW	BRA	Angelo Benedicto Sormani

== Transfers ==
=== Summer ===
In
Pos.	Name	from	Type
GK	Claudio Mantovani	Bari	loan ended
DF	Luigi Maldera	A.C. Monza	loan ended
DF	Paolo Montanari	Calcio Catania	loan
MF	Romano Fogli	Bologna F.C.	
FW	Angelo Paina	Padova Calcio	loan ended
FW	Carlo Petrini	Genoa	

Out
Pos.	Name	To	Type
DF	Alberto Grossetti	Calcio Catania	loaned out
MF	Massimo Giacomini	Triestina	
FW	Antonio Angelillo	Genoa	
FW	Angelo Paina	Triestina	loan

=== Autumn ===
Out
Pos.	Name	To	Type
GK	Claudio Mantovani	Atalanta B.C.	
FW	Lino Golin	Varese	loan

== Competitions ==
=== Serie A ===
==== League table ====
Pos	Team	Pld	W	D	L	GF	GA	GD	Pts	Qualification or relegation
1	Fiorentina (C)	30	16	13	1	38	18	+20	45	Qualification to European Cup
2	Cagliari	30	14	13	3	41	18	+23	41	Qualified to Inter-Cities Fairs Cup
3	Milan	30	14	13	3	31	12	+19	41	Qualification to European Cup (Note: Qualified as defending champions.)
4	Internazionale	30	14	8	8	55	26	+29	36	Qualified to Inter-Cities Fairs Cup
5	Juventus	30	12	11	7	32	24	+8	35	Qualified to Inter-Cities Fairs Cup

Source: Panini
(C) Champions

==== Results by round ====
Round	1	2	3	4	5	6	7	8	9	10	11	12	13	14	15	16	17	18	19	20	21	22	23	24	25	26	27	28	29	30
Ground	A	H	A	H	H	A	H	A	H	H	A	H	A	H	A	H	A	H	A	A	H	A	H	A	A	H	A	H	A	H
Result	W	W	W	D	W	D	W	L	D	W	D	W	D	D	W	D	W	W	D	D	D	D	W	L	W	W	L	W	D	D
Position	1	1	1	1	1	1	1	2	2	2	2	2	3	3	3	3	3	1	2	2	2	2	2	3	2	2	3	2	2	3

Source: Competitive matches
A = Away; H = Home; W = Win; D = Draw; L = Loss; = Leader, 1969-70 European Cup; = 1969–70 Inter-Cities Fairs Cup; = Relegation to 1969–70 Serie B

==== Matches ====
29 September 1968 1	Milan	1–0	Sampdoria	Milan
	Lodetti 43'	Report		Stadium: Stadio San Siro; Attendance: 39,452; Referee: Francesco De Robbio

6 October 1968 2	Hellas Verona	1–3	Milan	Brescia
	Maddè 61'	Report	28' Rivera; 50' Prati; 85' Sormani	Stadium: Stadio Mario Rigamonti; Attendance: 27,634; Referee: Lo Bello

13 October 1968 3	Milan	2–1	Pisa	Milan
	Sormani 27'; Prati 82'	Report	77' Joan	Stadium: Stadio San Siro; Attendance: 39,028; Referee: Barbaresco

27 October 1968 4	Fiorentina	0–0	Milan	Florence
		Report		Stadium: Stadio Comunale; Attendance: 42,665; Referee: Sbardella

3 November 1968 5	Milan	1–0	Inter	Milan
	Fogli 68'	Report		Stadium: Stadio San Siro; Attendance: 76,439; Referee: Angonese

10 November 1968 6	Atalanta	0–0	Milan	Bergamo
		Report		Stadium: Stadio Comunale; Attendance: 21,219; Referee: Francescon

17 November 1968 7	Milan	4–1	Lanerossi Vicenza	Milan
	Sormani 28'; Carlo Petrini 48'; Prati 78', 89'	Report	75' Gallina	Stadium: Stadio San Siro; Attendance: 23,713; Referee: Pieroni

24 November 1968 8	Bologna	1–0	Milan	Bologna
	Mujesan 38'	Report		Stadium: Stadio Comunale; Attendance: 40,790; Referee: Picasso

1 December 1968 9	Milan	0–0	Cagliari	Milan
		Report		Stadium: Stadio San Siro; Attendance: 75,062; Referee: Lo Bello

8 December 1968 10	Juventus	0–1	Milan	Turin
		Report	41' Hamrin	Stadium: Stadio Comunale; Attendance: 42,016; Referee: Monti

15 December 1968 11	Roma	1–1	Milan	Rome
	Taccola 62'	Report	38' Sormani	Stadium: Stadio Olimpico; Attendance: 63,320; Referee: Lo Bello

22 December 1968 12	Milan	1–0	Torino	Milan
	Rosato 88'	Report		Stadium: Stadio San Siro; Attendance: 32,878; Referee: Sbardella

12 January 1969 13	Varese	0–0	Milan	Varese
		Report		Stadium: Stadio Franco Ossola; Attendance: 12,951; Referee: Angonese

19 January 1969 14	Napoli	0–0	Milan	Naples
		Report		Stadium: Stadio San Paolo; Attendance: 75,054; Referee: Lo Bello

26 January 1969 15	Milan	1–0	Palermo	Milan
	Prati 44'	Report		Stadium: Stadio San Siro; Attendance: 40,628; Referee: Pieroni

2 February 1969 16	Sampdoria	1–1	Milan	Genoa
	Sabatini 80'	Report	37' (o.g.) Vincenzi	Stadium: Stadio Luigi Ferraris; Attendance: 24,697; Referee: De Marchi

9 February 1969 17	Milan	3–0	Hellas Verona	Milan
	Prati 32', 66', 78'	Report		Stadium: Stadio San Siro; Attendance: 39,008; Referee: Bernardis

15 February 1969 18	Pisa	0–1	Milan	Pisa
		Report	70' (o.g.) Gonfiantini	Stadium: Stadio Arena Garibaldi; Attendance: 25,640; Referee: Monti

23 February 1969 19	Milan	0–0	Fiorentina	Milan
		Report		Stadium: Stadio San Siro; Attendance: 57,283; Referee: Gonella

2 March 1969 20	Inter	1–1	Milan	Milan
	Corso 53'	Report	86' Prati	Stadium: Stadio San Siro; Attendance: 72,688; Referee: Lo Bello

8 March 1969 21	Milan	0–0	Atalanta	Milan
		Report		Stadium: Stadio San Siro; Attendance: 45,538; Referee: Lattanzi

16 March 1969 22	Lanerossi Vicenza	1–1	Milan	Vicenza
	Reif 70'	Report	45' Rivera	Stadium: Stadio Romeo Menti; Attendance: 27,500; Referee: Bernardis

23 March 1969 23	Milan	4–0	Bologna	Milan
	Fogli 41'; Prati 68', 81', 88'	Report		Stadium: Stadio San Siro; Attendance: 36,130; Referee: De Marchi

6 April 1969 24	Cagliari	3–1	Milan	Cagliari
	Greatti 16'; Nené 45'; Riva 54'	Report	33' Rivera	Stadium: Stadio Amsicora; Attendance: 23,352; Referee: Sbardella

13 April 1969 25	Milan	1–0	Juventus	Milan
	Prati 20'	Report		Stadium: Stadio San Siro; Attendance: 76,624; Referee: Lo Bello

19 April 1969 26	Milan	1–0	Roma	Milan
	Petrini 56'	Report		Stadium: Stadio San Siro; Attendance: 52,064; Referee: Monti

27 April 1969 27	Torino	1–0	Milan	Turin
	Cereser 17'	Report		Stadium: Stadio Comunale; Attendance: 42,337; Referee: Sbardella

4 May 1969 28	Milan	2–0	Varese	Milan
	Fogli 22'; Prati 36'	Report		Stadium: Stadio San Siro; Attendance: 28,426; Referee: D'Agostini

10 May 1969 29	Milan	0–0	Napoli	Milan
		Report		Stadium: Stadio San Siro; Attendance: 63,701; Referee: Angonese

18 May 1969 30	Palermo	0–0	Milan	Palermo
		Report		Stadium: Stadio La Favorita; Attendance: 17,160; Referee: Bernardis

=== Coppa Italia ===
==== Group 1 ====
8 September 1968 1	Milan	2–0	Ternana	Milan
	Rivera 17' (pen.); Sormani 31'			Stadium: Stadio San Siro; Attendance: 12,603; Referee: Bigi

14 September 1968 2	Monza	0–3	Milan	Monza
			55' Prati; 56' Hamrin; 63' Schnellinger	Stadium: Stadio Gino Alfonso Sada; Attendance: 8,579; Referee: Angonese

22 September 1968 3	Lanerossi Vicenza	0–0	Milan	Vicenza
				Stadium: Stadio Romeo Menti; Attendance: 13,088; Referee: D'Agostini

==== Quarterfinals ====
19 March 1969	Torino	1–0	Milan	Turin
	Bolchi 88'			Stadium: Stadio Comunale; Attendance: 12,172; Referee: Angonese

2 April 1969	Milan	0–1	Torino	Milan
			61' Fossati	Stadium: Stadio San Siro; Attendance: 6,014; Referee: Di Tonno

=== European Cup ===
==== Round of 32 ====
18 September 1968 1	Malmö FF (Sweden)	2–1	(Italy) Milan	Malmö
	Olsberg 45'; Elmstedt 50'	Report	58' Rivera	Stadium: Malmö Stadion; Attendance: 23,318; Referee: (West Germany) Siebert

2 October 1968 2	Milan (Italy)	4–1	(Sweden) Malmö FF	Milan
	Prati 32', 69'; Sormani 62'; Rivera 89' (pen.)	Report	16' Ljungberg	Stadium: Stadio San Siro; Attendance: 61,932; Referee: (France) Machin

==== Round of 16 ====
On starting of competition due to political issues related to Spring of Prague, the next teams abandoned the tournament:

- (Soviet Union) Dinamo Kiev
- (Hungary) Ferencváros
- (Bulgaria) Levski Sofia
- (Poland) Ruch Chorzów
- (East Germany) Carl Zeiss Jena

As a result, Milan, Benfica and Crvena Zvezda, qualified on table to the next round.

==== Quarterfinals ====
19 February 1969 1	Milan (Italy)	0–0	(Scotland) Celtic	Milan
		Report		Stadium: Stadio San Siro; Attendance: 62,402; Referee: (West Germany) Tschenscher

12 March 1969 2	Celtic (Scotland)	0–1	(Italy) Milan	Glasgow
		Report	12' Prati	Stadium: Celtic Park; Attendance: 70,000; Referee: (Spain) Ortiz de Mendibil

==== Semifinals ====
23 April 1969 1	Milan (Italy)	2–0	(England) Manchester United	Milan
	Sormani 33'; Hamrin 49'	Report		Stadium: Stadio San Siro; Attendance: 80,050; Referee: (Czechoslovakia) Krnávek

15 May 1969 2	Manchester United (England)	1–0	(Italy) Milan	Manchester
	Charlton 70'	Report		Stadium: Old Trafford; Attendance: 63,000; Referee: (France) Machin

==== Final ====
28 May 1969	Ajax (Netherlands)	1–4	(Italy) Milan	Madrid
	Vasović 60' (pen.)	Report	Prati 8', 40', 75'; Sormani 67'	Stadium: Estadio Santiago Bernabéu; Attendance: 59,000; Referee: (Spain) José Maria Ortiz de Mendibil

== Statistics ==
=== Squad statistics ===
Competition	Points	Home						Away						Total						GD
Competition	Points	G	W	D	L	Gs	Ga	G	W	D	L	Gs	Ga	G	W	D	L	Gs	Ga	GD
1968-69 Serie A	41	15	11	4	0	21	2	15	3	9	3	10	10	30	14	13	3	31	12	+19
1968-69 Coppa Italia	Quarterfinals	2	1	0	1	2	1	3	1	1	1	3	1	5	2	1	2	5	2	+3
1968-69 European Cup	Winners	3	2	1	0	6	1	3	1	0	2	2	3	7	4	1	2	12	5	+7
Total	–	20	14	5	1	29	4	21	5	10	6	15	14	42	20	15	7	48	19	+29

=== Players statistics ===
No.	Pos	Nat	Player	Total		Serie A		Coppa Italia		European Cup	
No.	Pos	Nat	Player	Apps	Goals	Apps	Goals	Apps	Goals	Apps	Goals
	GK	(Italy) ITA	Fabio Cudicini	37	-12	29	-8	2	-1	6	-3
	DF	(Italy) ITA	Angelo Anquilletti	40	0	30	0	3	0	7	0
	DF	(Italy) ITA	Saul Malatrasi	36	0	27	0	3	0	6	0
	DF	(Italy) ITA	Roberto Rosato	38	1	27	1	4	0	7	0
	DF	(West Germany) FRG	Karl-Heinz Schnellinger	31	1	20	0	4	1	7	0
	MF	(Italy) ITA	Romano Fogli	29	3	13+10	3	4	0	2	0
	MF	(Italy) ITA	Giovanni Lodetti	41	1	30	1	4	0	7	0
	MF	(Italy) ITA	Giovanni Trapattoni	32	0	17+5	0	5	0	5	0
	MF	(Italy) ITA	Gianni Rivera	39	6	28	3	4	1	7	2
	FW	(Italy) ITA	Pierino Prati	40	21	30	14	3	1	7	6
	FW	(Brazil) BRA	Angelo Benedicto Sormani	32	8	26	4	1	1	5	3
	GK	(Italy) ITA	Pierangelo Belli	2	-4	1	-3	1	-1	0	-0
	FW	(Sweden) SWE	Kurt Hamrin	22	3	12+1	1	3	1	6	1
	DF	(Italy) ITA	Luigi Maldera	17	0	12	0	1	0	4	0
	FW	(Italy) ITA	Carlo Petrini	13	2	8+1	2	3	0	1	0
	MF	(Italy) ITA	Giorgio Rognoni	15	0	8+1	0	3	0	3	0
	DF	(Italy) ITA	Nello Santin	13	0	6+1	0	3	0	3	0
	MF	(Italy) ITA	Nevio Scala	7	0	4	0	2	0	1	0
	FW	(Italy) ITA	Bruno Mora	3	0	2	0	1	0	0	0
	GK	(Italy) ITA	Villiam Vecchi	4	-3	0+1	-1	2	-0	1	-2
	DF	(Italy) ITA	Bruno Baveni	0	0	0	0	0	0	0	0
	MF	(Italy) ITA	Roberto Casone	1	0	0	0	1	0	0	0
	FW	(Italy) ITA	Lino Golin	3	0	0	0	2	0	1	0
	GK	(Italy) ITA	Claudio Mantovani	0	0	0	-0	0	-0	0	-0
	FW	(Italy) ITA	Angelo Marchi	1	0	0	0	1	0	0	0
	DF	(Italy) ITA	Paolo Montanari	0	0	0	0	0	0	0	0

== See also ==
- A.C. Milan

== Bibliography ==
- Almanacco illustrato del Milan, ed: 2, March 2005. Panini.
- Enrico Tosi. La storia del Milan, May 2005. Italia/Italy cid Tosi.
- Milan. Sempre con te, December 2009. Mondadori. 2009. ISBN 978-88-04-59118-4.
