= Pierangelo Belli =

Italian footballer (1944–2026)

Personal information
- Date of birth: 29 July 1944
- Place of birth: Limbiate, Italy
- Date of death: 6 February 2026 (aged 81)
- Height: 1.82 m (6 ft 0 in)
- Position: Goalkeeper

Senior career*
Years	Team	Apps	(Gls)
1963–1973	A.C. Milan	42	(0)
1964–1965	→ Chieti (loan)	12	(0)
1965–1966	→ Lecco (loan)	9	(0)
1973–1974	Hellas Verona	9	(0)
1975–1978	Pro Sesto		
1978–1979	Legnano	3	(0)
- * Club domestic league appearances and goals

Pierangelo Belli (29 July 1944 – 6 February 2026) was an Italian professional footballer who played as a goalkeeper. He spent six seasons (51 games) in Serie A for A.C. Milan and Hellas Verona. He died on 6 February 2026, at the age of 81.

== Honours ==
AC Milan

- Serie A: 1967–68
- Coppa Italia: 1966–67, 1971–72
- European Cup: 1968–69
- Intercontinental Cup: 1969
