= Karl-Heinz Schnellinger =

German footballer (1939–2024)

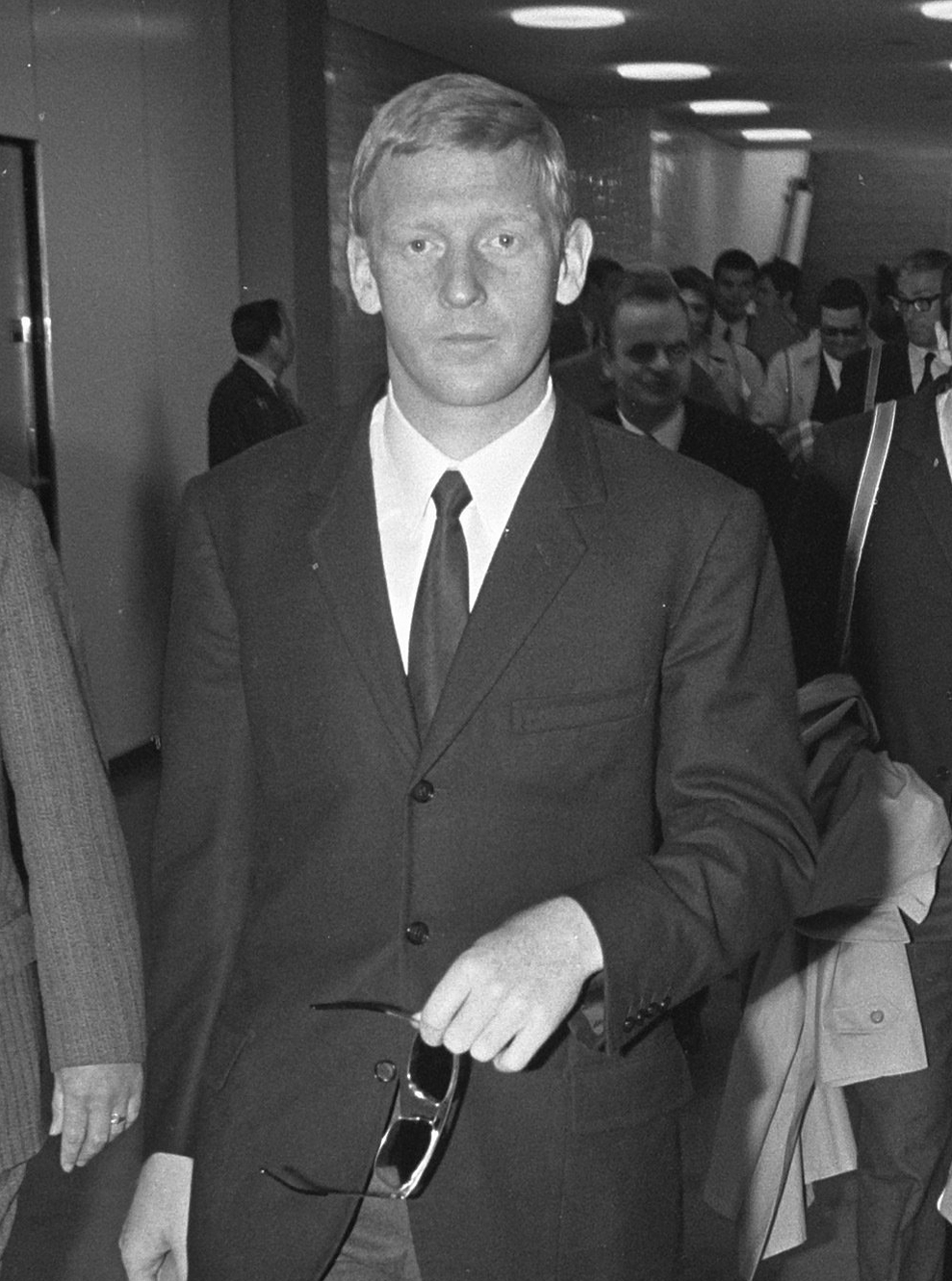
- Schnellinger in 1968

Personal information
- Date of birth: 31 March 1939
- Place of birth: Düren, Gau Cologne-Aachen, Germany
- Date of death: 20 May 2024 (aged 85)
- Place of death: Milan, Italy
- Height: 1.80 m (5 ft 11 in)
- Positions: Left-back; sweeper

Youth career
- 1949–1958: SG Düren 99

Senior career*
Years	Team	Apps	(Gls)
1958–1963	1. FC Köln	84	(8)
1963–1964	Mantova	33	(2)
1964–1965	Roma	29	(1)
1965–1974	AC Milan	222	(0)
1974–1975	Tennis Borussia Berlin	19	(0)
Total		387	(13)

International career
1957	West Germany Amateur	1	(0)
1958–1971	West Germany	47	(1)
Medal record
Representing West Germany
FIFA World Cup
Silver medal – second place	1966
Bronze medal – third place	1970
- * Club domestic league appearances and goals

Karl-Heinz Schnellinger (31 March 1939 – 20 May 2024) was a German footballer who played as a defender.

He started his professional career at 1. FC Köln, winning the German league title in 1962, before moving to Italy the following year. After season-long spells with Serie A sides Mantova and Roma, winning a Coppa Italia with the latter team, he joined AC Milan in 1965, where he had over 200 league appearances across nine seasons, winning numerous domestic and continental titles. He ended his career in Germany in 1975, after a season with Tennis Borussia Berlin.

At international level, Schnellinger represented West Germany at four World Cups, finishing fourth in 1958, second in 1966, and third in 1970.

An athletic and hard-tackling player, who possessed pace, a powerful physique, and a strong mentality, he was nicknamed the "Volkswagen" for his continuity of performance, both in quantity and in quality, and for his versatility; indeed, although he was usually deployed as a full-back, he was capable of playing anywhere along the back, and could also play as a centre-back, as a sweeper, or even as a defensive midfielder. He was one of the first successful German footballers abroad. In his prime he was often considered one of the best and most complete left-backs in the world in his era, rivaled only by Giacinto Facchetti, Nílton Santos and Silvio Marzolini.

== Club career ==
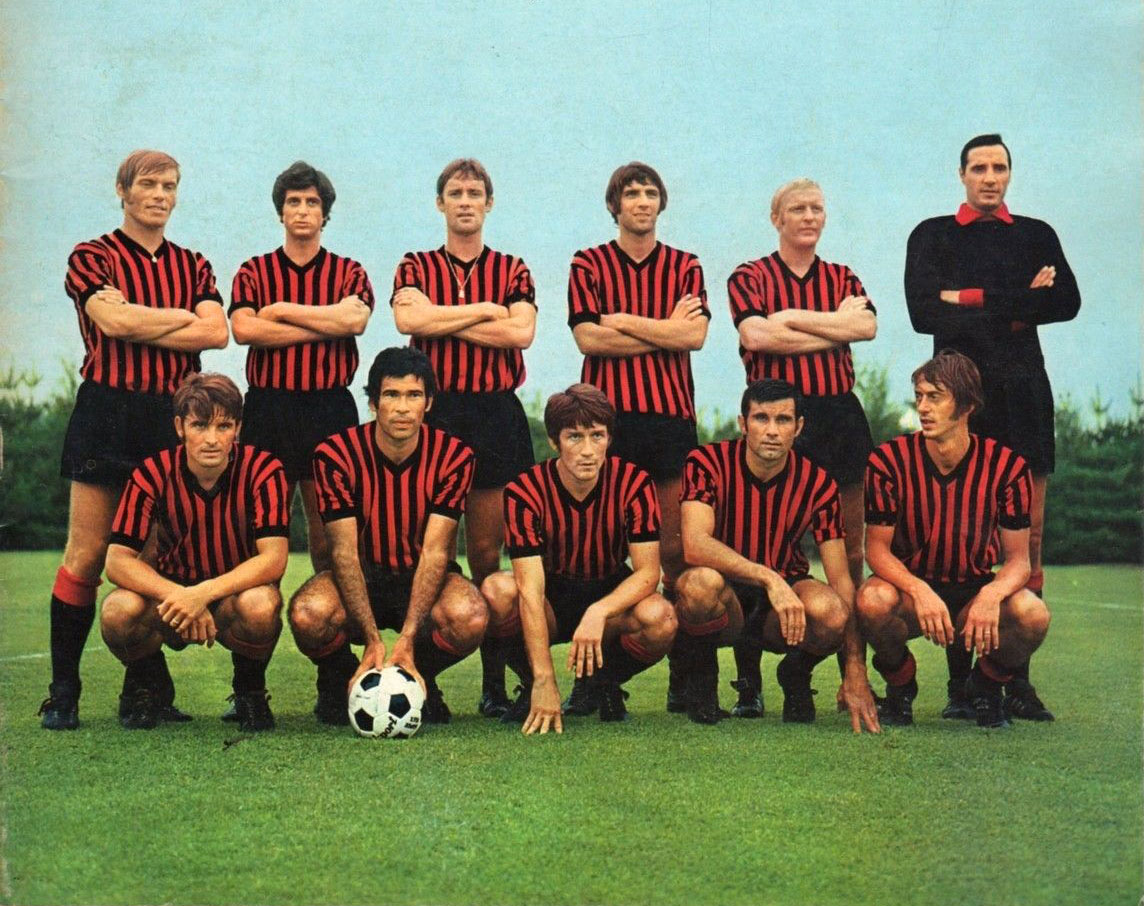
Schnellinger (top row, second from right) with the Rossoneri in 1970

Schnellinger was born in Düren (then in Rhine Province, Prussia, today North Rhine-Westphalia). After his appearance at the 1958 World Cup in Sweden at the age of 19, he signed for 1. FC Köln. Four years later, he won the German Championship with Köln, and was awarded the German Footballer of the Year. Following his performances at the 1962 FIFA World Cup, he received the third most votes for the Ballon d'Or.

Schnellinger left Köln for A.C. Mantova in 1963 and his debut in Serie A came in a match against A.C. Milan which ended in a surprising 4–1 victory for Mantova. However, he played there only for one season before he was signed by A.S. Roma in 1964 when they won the Coppa Italia, and finally by A.C. Milan in 1965, being transferred along with Roma teammates Antonio Valentín Angelillo and Angelo Sormani. He played nine seasons with the Rossoneri, obtaining several successes both at the national and European level, including winning the 1969 European Cup final against AFC Ajax.

He left Milan in 1974, and retired after a season back in his native Germany with Tennis Borussia Berlin.

== International career ==
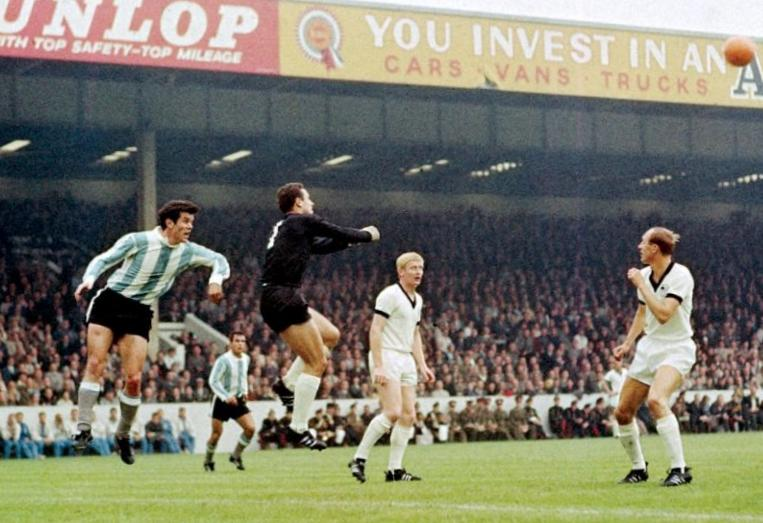
Schnellinger (pictured center) in the match against Argentina at the 1966 World Cup

Schnellinger participated in his first World Cup in Sweden in 1958, where the team finished in fourth place, and went on to become one of the few players to play in four World Cups (1958, 1962, 1966, 1970). He was renowned for his physical power, pace, and his winning mentality. His performances in 1962 saw him named in the Team of the Tournament.

He played in all the games at the finals in England in 1966, including the defeat to England in the 1966 FIFA World Cup final. His only international goal came in stoppage time to draw 1–1 in the thrilling semi-final of the 1970 World Cup against Italy, which later became known as the "Game of the Century". His goal led to the famous German TV commentary line by Ernst Huberty "Ausgerechnet Schnellinger!" – roughly: "Of all the players, it's Schnellinger" – which refers to him never having previously scored for the national team, and also to his being one of the two players in the German squad then playing in the Italian Serie A (the other being Helmut Haller). Italy eventually won 4–3 after extra time; West Germany would finish the tournament in third place. In the previous round, late in the match against England, it was Schnellinger's cross that Uwe Seeler scored from with a backwards header that tied the score 2–2, a game West Germany won 3–2 after extra time. Schnellinger won his last cap in 1971.

== Personal life and death ==
Schnellinger later lived in Milan's suburb of Segrate where he worked as a businessman after retirement from football. He died after a long illness at the San Raffaele Hospital in Milan, on 20 May 2024. He was 85. He was the last surviving player from the Germany team in the 1958 World Cup.

== Honours ==
1. FC Köln

- German Championship: 1962

Roma

- Coppa Italia: 1963–64

A.C. Milan

- Serie A: 1967–68
- Coppa Italia: 1966–67, 1971–72, 1972–73
- European Cup: 1968–69
- European Cup Winners' Cup: 1967–68, 1972–73
- Intercontinental Cup: 1969

West Germany

- FIFA World Cup: runner-up 1966, third place 1970, fourth place 1958

Individual

- Ballon d'Or third place: 1962
- German Footballer of the Year: 1962
- FIFA World Cup All-Star Team: 1962
- World XI: 1963, 1967
- FUWO European Team of the Year: 1965
- World Soccer World XI: 1969
- A.C. Milan Hall of Fame
