= Giovanni Lodetti =

Italian footballer (1942–2023)

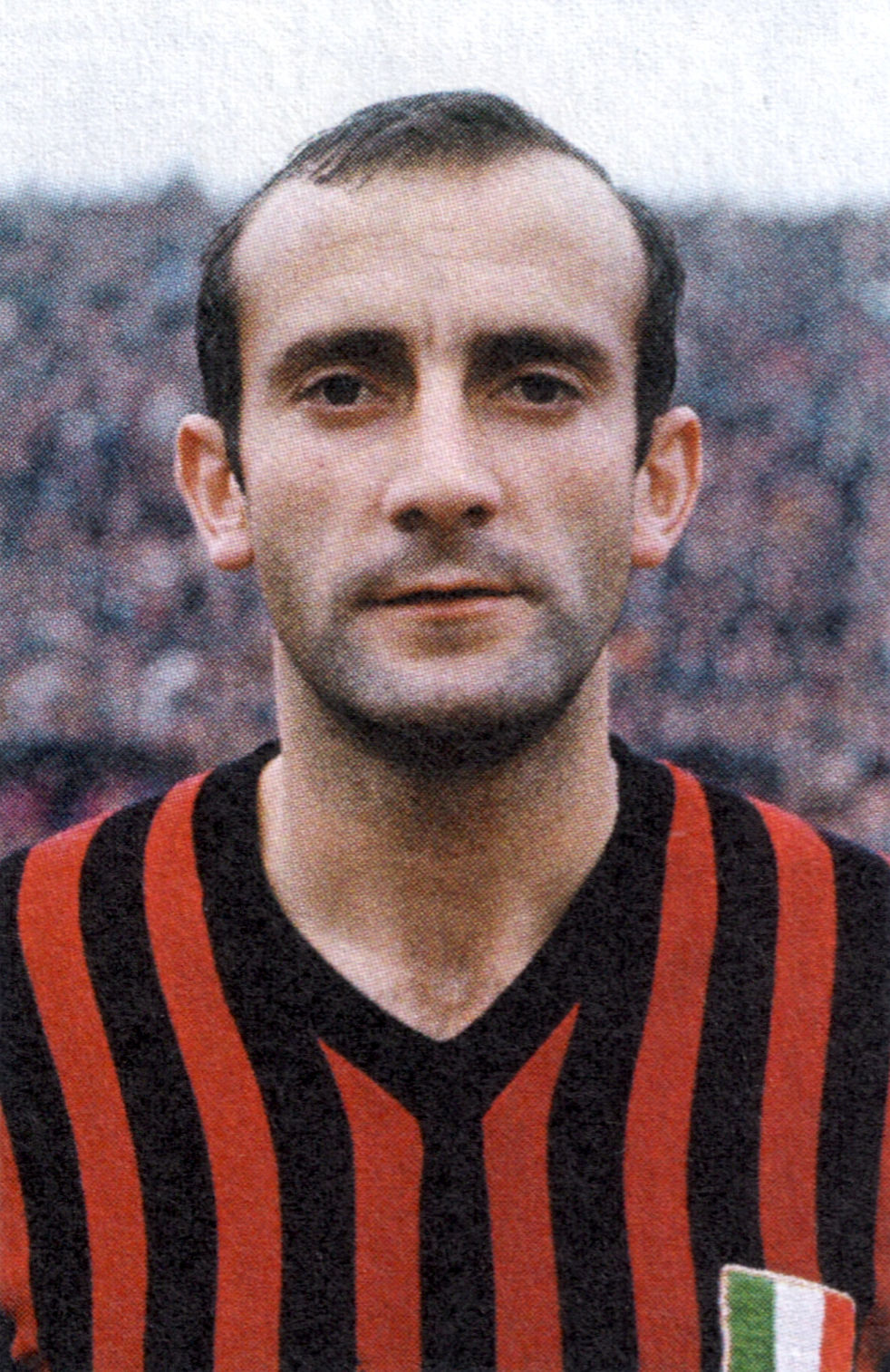
- Lodetti with AC Milan in 1969

Personal information
- Date of birth: 10 August 1942
- Place of birth: Caselle Lurani, Kingdom of Italy
- Date of death: 22 September 2023 (aged 81)
- Place of death: Milan, Italy
- Height: 1.66 m (5 ft 5 in)
- Position: Defensive midfielder

Youth career
- 1960–1963: A.C. Milan

Senior career*
Years	Team	Apps	(Gls)
1961–1970	A.C. Milan	216	(16)
1970–1974	Sampdoria	117	(0)
1974–1976	Foggia	61	(1)
1976–1978	Novara	38	(0)
Total		432	(17)

International career
1964–1968	Italy	17	(2)
Medal record
Men's football
Representing Italy (as player)
UEFA European Championship
Winner	1968 Italy
- * Club domestic league appearances and goals

Giovanni Lodetti (Italian pronunciation: [dʒoˈvanni loˈdetti]; 10 August 1942 – 22 September 2023) was an Italian professional footballer who played as a midfielder. A hard-working player, he usually supported his more creative teammates defensively, excelling as a defensive midfielder due to his stamina and his ability to read the game. Despite his supporting role in midfield, he also possessed good technique and creativity, as well as an eye for goal, which also saw him participate in his teams attacking moves.

== Club career ==
Lodetti is mostly remembered for his time as a defensive midfielder with Italian club Milan, with which he achieved great domestic and international success in the 60s alongside playmaker Gianni Rivera, winning two Serie A titles (the first during his debut season), a Coppa Italia, two European Cups, a Cup Winners' Cup, and an Intercontinental Cup. He later also played for Sampdoria, Foggia, and Novara, before retiring in 1978.

== International career ==
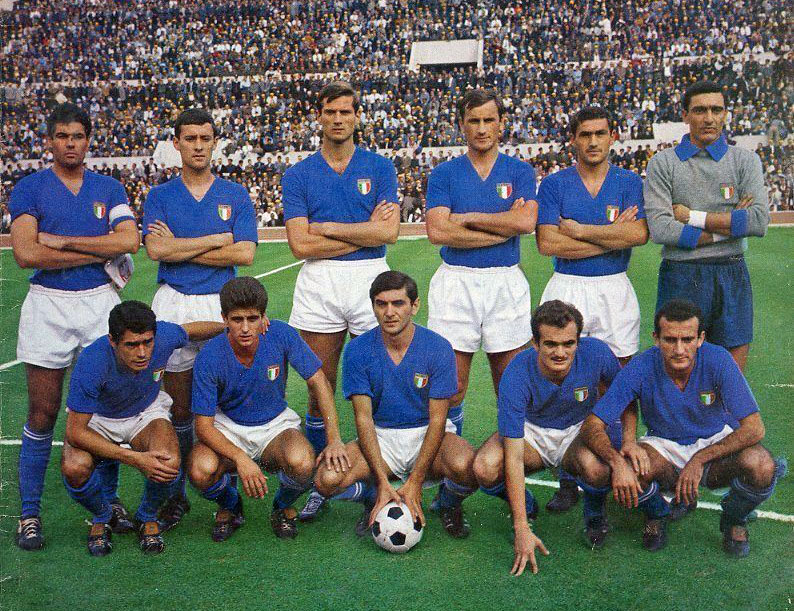
Lodetti (bottom row, first from right) with the Italy national team in 1965

Lodetti also represented the Italy national side at the 1966 World Cup in England, where they were eliminated in the first round. He was also a member of the Italy national squad at the UEFA Euro 1968 victorious campaign on home soil. Although he was set to participate in the 1970 World Cup, in which Italy reached the final, he was dropped at the last minute due to an injury to Anastasi, which led manager Ferruccio Valcareggi to call up Roberto Boninsegna and Pierino Prati in his place. In total he represented his national team 17 times between 1964 and 1968, scoring two goals. He also represented the under-21 side in their victorious campaign at the 1963 Mediterranean games.

== Death ==
Giovanni Lodetti died on 22 September 2023, at the age of 81.

== Honours ==
AC Milan

- Serie A: 1961–62, 1967–68
- Coppa Italia: 1966–67
- European Cup: 1962–63, 1968–69
- Cup Winners' Cup: 1967–68
- Intercontinental Cup: 1969

Italy

- UEFA European Football Championship: 1968

Individual

- AC Milan Hall of Fame
