= Bruno Baveni =

Italian football player and coach (1939–2025)

Personal information
- Date of birth: 15 December 1939
- Place of birth: Sestri Levante, Italy
- Date of death: 13 December 2025 (aged 85)
- Height: 1.83 m (6 ft 0 in)
- Position: Defender

Youth career
- 1958–1959: Sestri Levante

Senior career*
Years	Team	Apps	(Gls)
1959–1966	Genoa	168	(13)
1966–1969	A.C. Milan	10	(0)
1969–1970	Savona	15	(2)
1970–1973	Trento	88	(0)
1973–1974	Sestri Levante		

Managerial career
- 1974–1975: Sestri Levante
- 1976–1977: Entella
- 1977–1979: Imperia
- 1979–1981: Trento
- 1981–1982: Sanremese
- 1982–1983: Pavia
- 1983–1984: Imperia
- 1984–1986: Trento
- 1986–1988: Entella
- 1988–1992: Casale
- 1993–1994: Entella
- 1995–1996: Pro Vercelli
- 1998–1999: Entella
- * Club domestic league appearances and goals

Bruno Baveni (15 December 1939 – 13 December 2025) was an Italian football player and coach.

A defender, he played six seasons (92 games, 8 goals) in the Serie A for Genoa C.F.C. and A.C. Milan.

Baveni died on 13 December 2025, at the age of 85.

== Honours ==
AC Milan

- Serie A: 1967–68
- Coppa Italia: 1966–67
- European Cup: 1968–69
