= Franco Dori =

Italian footballer

Personal information
- Date of birth: May 7, 1943
- Place of birth: Venice, Italy
- Height: 1.71 m (5 ft 7 1/2 in)
- Position: Midfielder

Senior career*
Years	Team	Apps	(Gls)
1962–1963	Venezia	7	(3)
1963	Roma	1	(0)
1963–1964	Venezia	27	(7)
1964–1965	Messina	10	(1)
1965–1968	Venezia	44	(9)
1968–1970	Alessandria	54	(?)
1970–1971	Venezia	32	(?)
- * Club domestic league appearances and goals

Franco Dori (May 7, 1943 – November 29, 1987) was an Italian professional football player. He was born in Venice.

He played for 4 seasons (34 games, 7 goals) in the Serie A for S.S.C. Venezia, A.S. Roma and A.C.R. Messina.
