= Giorgio Rognoni =

Italian footballer

- Rognoni with Milan in the 1969–70 season

Personal information
- Date of birth: 26 October 1946
- Place of birth: Modena, Italy
- Date of death: 20 March 1986 (aged 39)
- Place of death: Pistoia, Italy
- Height: 1.76 m (5 ft 9 1/2 in)
- Position: Midfielder

Youth career
- Modena

Senior career*
Years	Team	Apps	(Gls)
1964–1967	Modena	45	(8)
1967–1971	Milan	54	(3)
1971–1974	Foggia	94	(14)
1974–1978	Cesena	119	(10)
1978–1983	Pistoiese	136	(11)
- * Club domestic league appearances and goals

Giorgio Rognoni (26 October 1946 in Modena, Italy – 20 March 1986 in Pistoia) was an Italian professional footballer who played as a midfielder.

== Career ==
Born in Modena, Rognoni began playing football with local side Modena. In 1967, he signed with Milan, where he would make his Serie A debut against Mantova on 11 February 1968. He played for 9 seasons (193 games, 13 goals) in the Serie A for A.C. Milan, U.S. Foggia, A.C. Cesena and A.C. Pistoiese.

== Honours ==
Milan

- Serie A champion: 1967–68.
- European Cup winner: 1968–69.
- UEFA Cup Winners' Cup winner: 1967–68.
- Intercontinental Cup winner: 1969.
