= Angelo Sormani =

Italian footballer (born 1939)

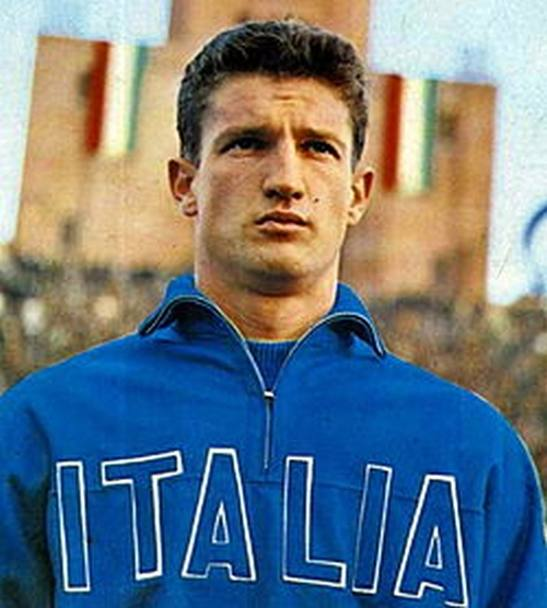

Personal information
- Full name: Angelo Benedicto Miguel Sormani
- Date of birth: 3 July 1939 (age 87)
- Place of birth: Jaú, Brazil
- Height: 1.82 m (6 ft 0 in)
- Position: Striker

Youth career
- XV de Jaú
- Santos

Senior career*
Years	Team	Apps	(Gls)
1959–1961	Santos		
1961–1963	Mantova	64	(29)
1963–1964	Roma	25	(6)
1964–1965	Sampdoria	30	(2)
1965–1970	Milan	137	(45)
1970–1972	Napoli	53	(7)
1972–1973	Fiorentina	9	(0)
1973–1976	Vicenza	57	(12)
Total		375	(101)

International career
1962–1963	Italy	7	(2)

Managerial career
- 1980: Napoli
- 1987: Roma
- * Club domestic league appearances and goals

Angelo Benedicto Miguel Sormani (Italian: [ˈandʒelo sorˈmaːni]; Portuguese pronunciation: [ˈɐ̃ʒelu soʁˈmɐni]; born 3 July 1939) is a Brazilian-born Italian former football manager and player, who played as a forward; he was capable of playing anywhere along the front-line, as a centre-forward, as well as in an attacking midfield role, or also as a winger on the right flank. Born in Brazil, he represented the Italy national team at the 1962 FIFA World Cup. While lacking pace, he was a physically strong, creative and intelligent player with excellent technical ability; throughout his career, he was known for his tactical versatility, power and determination, as well as his capability to take part in and initiate attacking plays due to his passing ability. Following his retirement, he also worked as a manager, coaching two clubs for which he formerly played: Roma, and Napoli.

== Club career ==
Before moving to Italy to play in Serie A, where he would spend most of his professional life, Sormani began his club career in his home country of Brazil, where he initially played for Santos FC; he was initially used as a backup striker to Pelé, but despite this limitation, he was able to move into the starting line-up due to his versatility, and his ability to adapt to any position along the front line.

After moving to Italy, Sormani made his Serie A debut with AC Mantova in 1961, spending two seasons with the club (1961–63), where he displayed his talent and potential, earning the nickname "the white Pelé". He subsequently attracted the attention of larger clubs, and he moved to AS Roma for the 1963–64 season, for an at the time world record of 500 million Lire in 1963, in addition to 250 million more, including the value of the three players Mantova received from Roma in exchange: Torbjörn Jonsson, Elvio Salvori, and Karl-Heinz Schnellinger. During the single season he spent with the capital club, he won the Coppa Italia, although he was unable to display consistently the talent he had demonstrated whilst playing at Mantova. After a difficult season, Sormani spent the 1964–65 season with Sampdoria, where he also struggled, before moving to AC Milan in 1965, where he flourished, and achieved notable domestic and international success. During his time at Milan, he finally fulfilled his potential and established himself as one of the league's top players, winning the 1967–68 Serie A title, the Coppa Italia during the 1966–67 season, the 1967–68 European Cup Winners' Cup, the 1968–69 European Cup, and the 1969 Intercontinental Cup.

After his successful time with Milan, in 1970, he moved to SSC Napoli for two seasons, before spending the 1972–73 season with Fiorentina. He moved to Vicenza Calcio in 1973, where he spent three seasons, before ending his career in 1976.

== International career ==
Born in Brazil, Sormani made seven appearances and scored two goals for the Italy national team between 1962 and 1963, after obtaining Italian citizenship due to his Italian origins (grandson of emigrants from Garfagnana (paternal grandparents) and the Polesine (maternal grandparents)); he represented Italy at the 1962 FIFA World Cup in Chile, where they were eliminated in the first round.

== Honours ==
Roma

- Coppa Italia: 1963–64

Milan

- Serie A: 1967–68
- Coppa Italia: 1966–67
- European Cup: 1968–69
- European Cup Winners' Cup: 1967–68
- Intercontinental Cup: 1969

Individual

- AC Milan Hall of Fame
