= Riccardo Innocenti (footballer, born 1943) =

Italian footballer (1943–2026)

Riccardo Innocenti (29 July 1943 – 22 September 2026) was an Italian footballer. He played 47 times (11 goals) in Serie A, and 314 times (57 goals) in Serie B as a midfielder. Innocenti died on 22 September 2026, at the age of 83.
