= Bertil Elmstedt =

Swedish footballer

Personal information
- Full name: Bertil Elmstedt
- Date of birth: 2 May 1937 (age 89)
- Place of birth: Sweden
- Position: Midfielder

Youth career
- Malmö FF

Senior career*
Years	Team	Apps	(Gls)
1956–1969	Malmö FF	192	(36)

International career
1964–1968	Sweden	6	(0)
- * Club domestic league appearances and goals

Bertil Elmstedt (born 2 May 1937) is a Swedish former footballer who played his entire career at Malmö FF as a midfielder.

Elmstedt joined Malmö FF as a youth player. He played a total of 350 matches for the club and helped win two Swedish Championship titles. After his time at MFF, he played a couple of years at IFK Ystad. Elmstedt also played six international matches for Sweden during his career.
