= Giuliano Taccola =

Italian footballer

Personal information
- Date of birth: 28 June 1944
- Place of birth: Uliveto Terme, Italy
- Date of death: 16 March 1969 (aged 24)
- Place of death: Cagliari, Italy
- Height: 1.79 m (5 ft 10 1/2 in)
- Position: Striker

Senior career*
| Years | Team | Apps | (Gls) |
| 1961–1962 | Genoa | 0 | (0) |
| 1962–1963 | Alessandria | 22 | (2) |
| 1963–1964 | Varese | 2 | (0) |
| 1964–1965 | Entella | 27 | (7) |
| 1965–1966 | Savona | 32 | (13) |
| 1966–1967 | Genoa | 32 | (4) |
| 1967–1969 | Roma | 41 | (18) |
- * Club domestic league appearances and goals

Giuliano Taccola (28 June 1944 in Uliveto Terme – 16 March 1969 in Cagliari) was an Italian professional footballer who played as a striker.

== Career ==
Taccola began his football career in 1961, and played for several Italian clubs throughout his career, including Genoa, Alessandria, Varese, Entella, and Savona, before joining Roma in 1967, where he spent two seasons in the Italian Serie A, playing 41 games and scoring 18 goals.

He made his Serie A debut with Roma on 24 September 1967, marking the occasion with a goal in a 1–1 away draw against Inter. He finished his first season with the club with ten goals.

On 29 September 1968, he scored the opening goal of the 1968–69 campaign, scoring after only 30 seconds in a 2–1 home defeat to Fiorentina. During the course of his second Serie A season with the club, however, his level of performance dropped due to fever, weight loss, a sore throat, and a high heart rate, but the club's manager Helenio Herrera decided to continue to play him. On 25 January 1969, Taccola was hospitalised due to tonsillitis; he was operated on 5 February. On 2 March 1969, he returned to the pitch but injured his ankle in a game against Sampdoria, and two weeks later, after a game against Cagliari, to which he accompanied the team, he suffered a seizure in the locker room. He died in an ambulance on the way to the hospital, at the age of 24, with official cause of death being heart failure due to pneumonia. He is survived by his widow, Marzia. Taccola scored 7 goals in 12 appearances for Roma during his second season with the club.

According to a 2004 interview by Ferruccio Mazzola in L'espresso, Taccola was a victim of performance-enhancing drugs, the use of which allegedly was widespread under Helenio Herrera.

== Honours ==
Savona

- Serie C: 1965–66

Roma

- Coppa Italia: 1968–69

Individual

- A.S. Roma Hall of Fame: 2018
