= Massimo Giacomini =

Italian footballer and manager

Personal information
- Date of birth: 14 August 1939 (age 87)
- Place of birth: Udine, Italy
- Position: Midfielder

Youth career
- Udinese

Senior career*
Years	Team	Apps	(Gls)
1957–1961	Udinese	97	(2)
1961–1963	Genoa	62	(5)
1963–1964	Lazio	16	(0)
1964–1965	Genoa	18	(0)
1965–1966	Brescia	12	(0)
1966–1968	Milan	1	(0)
1968–1970	Triestina	66	(13)
1970–1973	Udinese	99	(6)

Managerial career
- 1973–1974: Udinese
- 1974–1975: Treviso
- 1975: Salernitana
- 1977–1979: Udinese
- 1979–1981: Milan
- 1981–1982: Torino
- 1982: Napoli
- 1984–1985: Triestina
- 1985–1986: Perugia
- 1986–1987: Venezia
- 1987: Udinese
- 1989: Brescia
- 1989–1990: Triestina
- 1991: Cagliari
- * Club domestic league appearances and goals

Massimo Giacomini (born 14 August 1939) is an Italian former football player and manager. Today, Giacomini is a TV pundit for the Italian television Udinese Channel.
