= Pierino Prati =

Italian footballer (1946–2020)

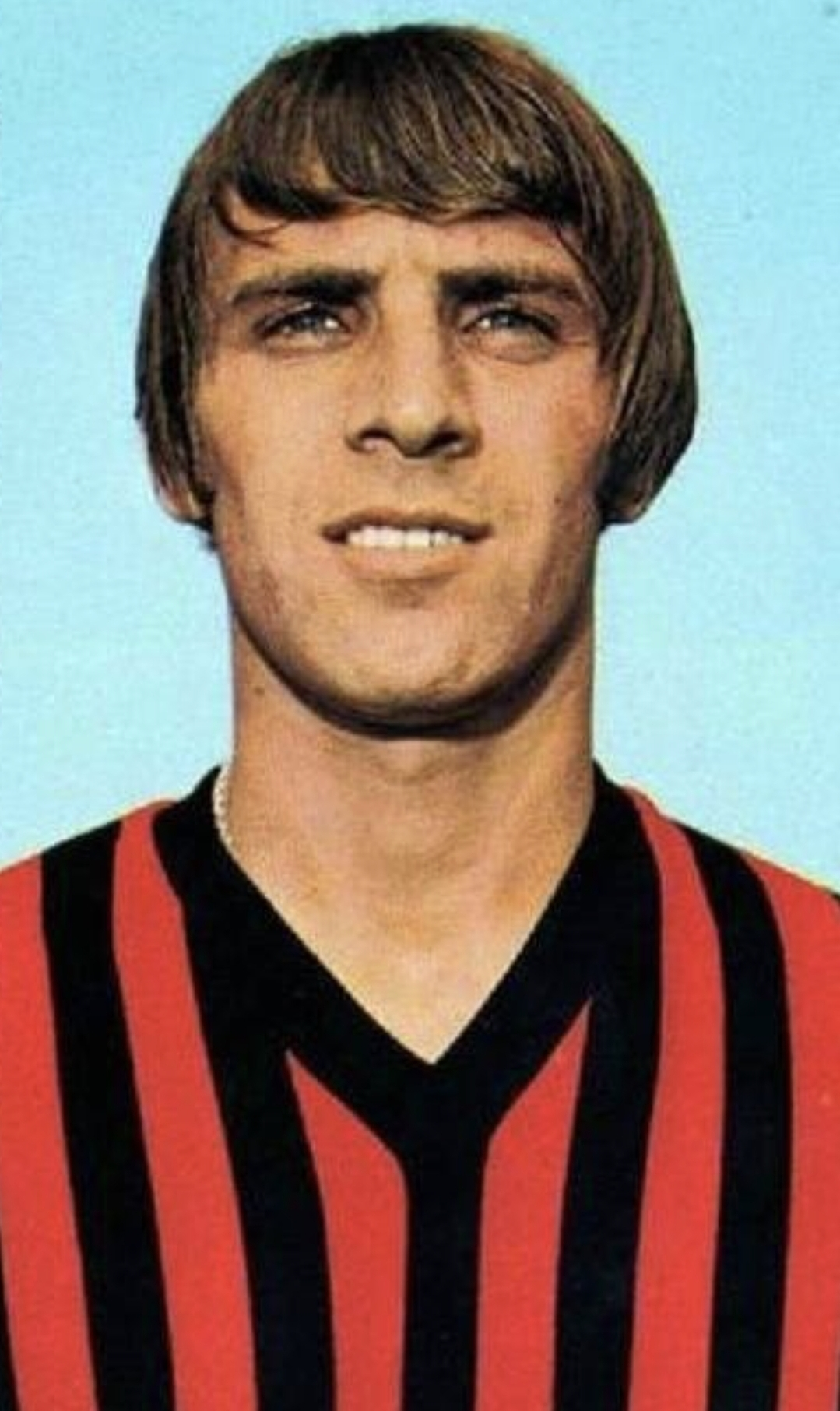
- Prati with AC Milan in 1973

Personal information
- Date of birth: 13 December 1946
- Place of birth: Cinisello Balsamo, Italy
- Date of death: 22 June 2020 (aged 73)
- Place of death: Como, Italy
- Height: 1.81 m (5 ft 11 in)
- Position: Striker

Senior career*
Years	Team	Apps	(Gls)
1965–1966	Salernitana	19	(10)
1966–1973	AC Milan	143	(72)
1966–1967	→ Savona (loan)	29	(15)
1973–1977	Roma	82	(28)
1977–1978	Fiorentina	8	(0)
1978–1979	Savona	25	(10)
1979	Rochester Lancers	6	(3)
1979–1981	Savona	54	(24)
Total		366	(162)

International career
1968–1974	Italy	14	(7)
Medal record
Men's football
Representing Italy (as player)
UEFA European Championship
Winner	1968 Italy
FIFA World Cup
Runner-up	1970 Mexico
- * Club domestic league appearances and goals

Pierino Prati (Italian pronunciation: [pjeˈriːno ˈpraːti]; 13 December 1946 – 22 June 2020) was an Italian footballer who played mainly as a forward. He began his career with Salernitana, and later played for several other Italian clubs, including a successful spell with AC Milan, with whom he won several titles. As of 2026, he is the last person to score a hat-trick in a European Cup final, having done so in 1969 against Ajax.

At international level, Prati represented Italy on 14 occasions between 1968 and 1974, scoring seven goals; he was a member of the teams that won UEFA Euro 1968 on home soil, and which reached the 1970 FIFA World Cup final. He also had a brief spell with Rochester Lancers in the NASL in 1979.

== Club career ==
Also known as "Pierino the pest", Prati began his career playing in Serie C1 with Salernitana, winning the title and promotion to Serie B during the 1965–66 season. He is mostly remembered for his highly successful and prolific stint with Italian club AC Milan under manager Nereo Rocco in the 60s and 70s, during which he achieved great international and domestic success, winning a Serie A title, a European Cup, two Cup Winners' Cups, an Intercontinental Cup, and two Coppa Italia titles, forming an excellent partnership with Gianni Rivera.

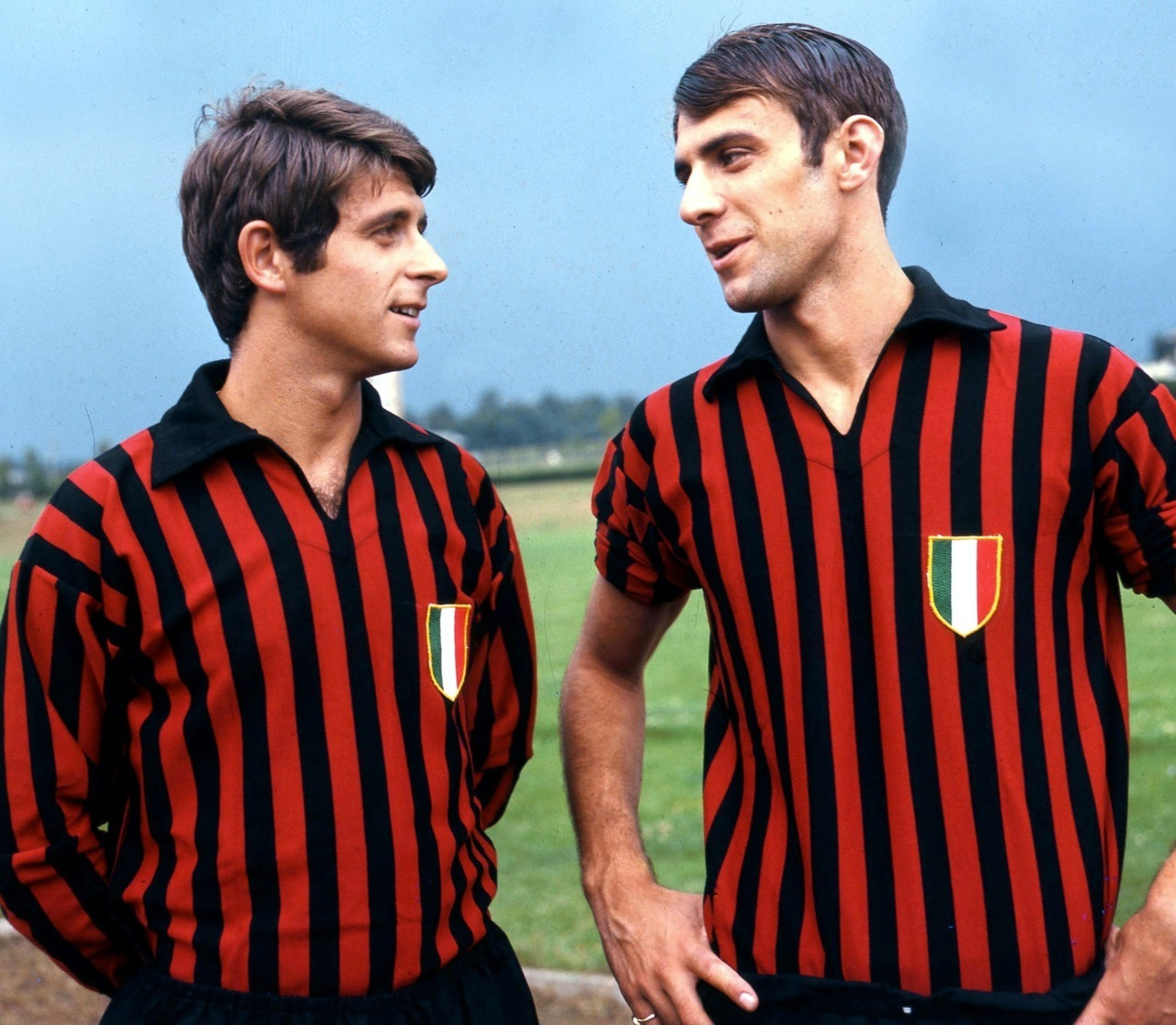
Gianni Rivera and Prati with AC Milan in the 1968–69 season

He made his Serie A debut with the club during the end of the 1965–66 season, on 18 September 1966, in a 2–1 win over Venezia, but was briefly loaned to Serie B club Savona during the 1966–67 season. He later helped Milan to win the 1967–68 Serie A title, finishing the season as the top goalscorer in the Italian league, with 15 goals. He was also notably part of their European Cup victory in 1969, scoring a hat-trick in the 4–1 defeat of Ajax in the final, and six goals in total throughout the competition. As of 2023, he is the last man to have scored a hat-trick in the European Cup/Champions League final. Ferenc Puskás (twice) and Alfredo Di Stefano (both of Real Madrid) are the only other players to have achieved this.

Overall, he played for 12 seasons (233 games, 100 goals) in the Italian Serie A with Milan, Roma and Fiorentina. He also played for Savona once again in Serie C2 in his later career, as well as the Rochester Lancers in the NASL.

== International career ==
Prati also played for the Italy national team. He was most notably a member of the Italian side that won the 1968 UEFA European Football Championship on home soil, during which he made his debut on 6 April, scoring a goal in a 3–2 loss against Bulgaria in the first leg of the quarter-finals, and another in the 2–0 victory in the return leg. He played the first final match alongside Pietro Anastasi, but was replaced by Gigi Riva in the re-match, the striker who would often keep him on the bench for Italy. With his national team, Prati also reached the final of the 1970 FIFA World Cup, losing out to Brazil. In total, he was capped 14 times for the national side between 1968 and 1974, scoring 7 times.

== Style of play ==
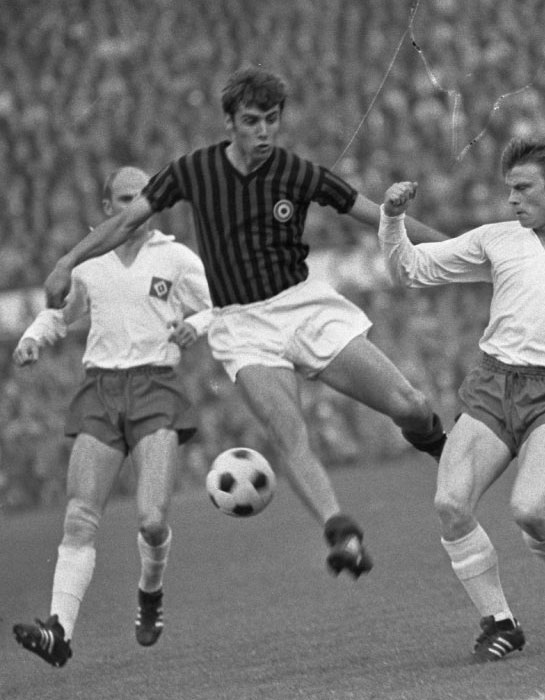
Prati in 1968

Prati was capable of playing anywhere along the front-line, as a striker, supporting forward, and as a winger. At Milan, he was often deployed on the left wing due to his pace, technique, distribution, and was also known for his powerful and accurate shot from both inside and outside the penalty area, as well as his ability in the air.

== Personal life ==
Prati's son, Cristiano, is also a footballer, who plays in the lower Italian divisions.

== Death ==
Prati died on 22 June 2020, after being ill for some time.

== Career statistics ==
=== Club ===
Appearances and goals by club, season and competition
Club	Season	League		Cup		Europe		Total	
Club	Season	Apps	Goals	Apps	Goals	Apps	Goals	Apps	Goals
Salernitana	1965–66	19	10	0	0	0	0	19	10
AC Milan	1965–66	2	0	0	0	0	0	2	0
AC Milan	1967–68	23	15	7	3	8	4	38	22
AC Milan	1968–69	30	14	3	1	7	6	40	21
AC Milan	1969–70	21	12	3	3	4	2	28	17
AC Milan	1970–71	29	19	10	3	0	0	39	22
AC Milan	1971–72	21	6	11	4	7	2	39	12
AC Milan	1972–73	17	6	0	0	4	2	21	8
AC Milan	Total	143	72	34	14	30	16	207	102
Savona (loan)	1966–67	29	15	0	0	0	0	29	15
Roma	1973–74	23	8	3	0	0	0	26	8
Roma	1974–75	29	14	10	8	0	0	39	22
Roma	1975–76	10	2	3	3	6	0	19	5
Roma	1976–77	20	4	2	1	0	0	22	5
Roma	1977–78	0	0	4	1	0	0	4	1
Roma	Total	82	28	22	13	6	0	110	41
Fiorentina	1977–78	8	0	0	0	0	0	8	0
Savona	1978–79	25	10	0	0	0	0	25	10
Rochester Lancers	1979	6	3	0	0	0	0	6	3
Savona	1979–80	27	12	0	0	0	0	27	12
Savona	1980–81	27	12	0	0	0	0	27	12
Savona	Total	54	24	0	0	0	0	54	24
Career total		366	162	56	27	36	16	458	205

=== International ===
Appearances and goals by national team and year
National team	Year	Apps	Goals
Italy	1968	4	2
Italy	1969	2	0
Italy	1970	1	1
Italy	1971	4	2
Italy	1972	2	2
Italy	1973	0	0
Italy	1974	1	0
Total		14	7

== Honours ==
Salernitana

- Serie C1: 1965–66

AC Milan

- Serie A: 1967–68
- Coppa Italia: 1971–72, 1972–73
- European Cup: 1968–69
- European Cup Winners' Cup: 1967–68, 1972–73
- Intercontinental Cup: 1969

Italy

- UEFA European Championship: 1968
- FIFA World Cup: runner-up 1970

Individual

- Serie A top scorer: 1967–68 (15 goals)
- AC Milan Hall of Fame

== See also ==
- List of footballers who achieved hat-trick records
