= 1966–67 Coppa Italia =

Tournament details
- Country: Italy
- Dates: 3 Sept 1966 – 14 June 1967
- Teams: 38

Final positions
- Champions: AC Milan (1st title)
- Runners-up: Padova

Tournament statistics
- Matches played: 37
- Goals scored: 97 (2.62 per match)
- Top goal scorer: Gianni Rivera (7 goals)

The 1966–67 Coppa Italia, the 20th Coppa Italia was an Italian Football Federation domestic cup competition won by AC Milan.

== First round ==
Home team	Score	Away team
Alessandria	0–1	Torino
Arezzo	1–0	Cagliari
Catania	0–1	Lazio
Catanzaro	1–3	Foggia
Livorno	0–0 (aet) *	Vicenza
Modena	1–1 (aet) *	SPAL
Novara	1–4	Lecco
Padova	2–1 (aet)	Venezia
Palermo	2–2 (aet) *	Roma
Pisa	0–3	Milan
Reggiana	1–0 (aet)	Mantova
Reggina	0–1 (aet)	Messina
Salernitana	1–0 (aet)	Potenza
Sampdoria	1–0	Genoa
Savona	0–1 (aet)	Juventus
Varese	4–1	Atalanta
Hellas Verona	1–0	Brescia

* Vicenza, Modena and Palermo qualified after drawing of lots.

== Intermediate round ==
Home team	Score	Away team
Reggiana	1–0	Hellas Verona

== Second round ==
Home team	Score	Away team
Foggia	0–3	Vicenza
Juventus	3–0	Arezzo
Lazio	0–2	Lecco
Milan	5–2	Modena
Padova	3–2	Palermo
Sampdoria	1–0	Salernitana
Torino	4–0	Messina
Varese	0–0 (p: 7–6)	Reggiana

p=after penalty shoot–out

== Third round ==
Home team	Score	Away team
Juventus	5–2 (aet)	Vicenza
Milan	4–2	Torino
Padova	3–0	Varese
Sampdoria	1–1 (p: 3–4)	Lecco

p=after penalty shoot–out

== Quarter–finals ==
FC Bologna, Internazionale, Fiorentina and Napoli are added.

Home team	Score	Away team
Bologna	1–1 (p: 4–5)	Juventus
Internazionale	1–0	Fiorentina
Lecco	1–2	Milan
Padova	2–1 (aet)	Napoli

p=after penalty shoot–out

== Semi–finals ==
Home team	Score	Away team
Juventus	1–2 (aet)	Milan
Padova	3–2	Internazionale

== Final ==
14 June 1967

Milan	1–0	Padova
Amarildo 49'

Stadio Olimpico, Rome
Referee: Mario Bernardis

== Top goalscorers ==
Rank	Player	Club	Goals
1	(Italy) Gianni Rivera	Milan	7
2	(Italy) Italo Carminati	Padova	4
3	(Brazil) Amarildo	Milan	3
3	(Italy) Aquilino Bonfanti	Lecco	3
3	(Brazil) Sergio Clerici	Lecco	3
3	(Italy) Virginio De Paoli	Juventus	3
3	(Italy) Gianfranco Zigoni	Juventus	3
3	(Italy) Alberto Bigon	Padova	3
3	(Italy) Cosimo Nocera	Foggia	3
