= 1967–68 Serie A =

65th season of top-tier Italian football

Serie A
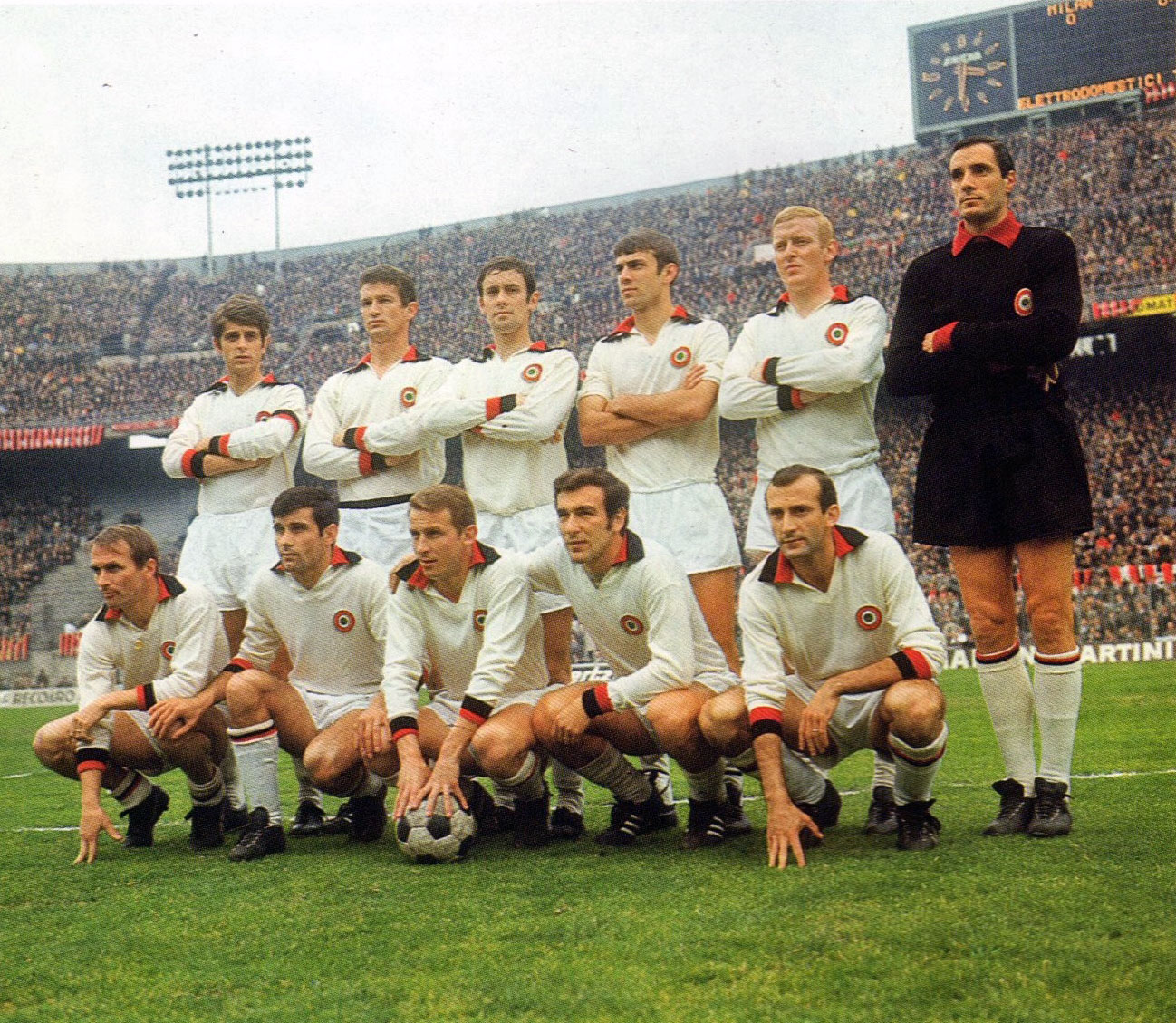
- 1967–68 Milan team
- Season: 1967–68
- Dates: 24 September 1967 – 12 May 1968
- Champions: Milan; 9th title
- Relegated: SPAL; Brescia; Mantova
- European Cup: Milan
- Cup Winners' Cup: Torino
- Inter-Cities Fairs Cup: Napoli; Juventus; Fiorentina; Bologna
- Matches: 240
- Goals: 504 (2.1 per match)
- Top goalscorer: Pierino Prati (15 goals)

Serie A 1967-68 team distribution

The 1967–68 Serie A season was won by Milan.

== Teams ==
Sampdoria and Varese had been promoted from Serie B.

Six out of the sixteen clubs came from Lombardy, a record for a single region of Italy.

== Final classification ==
| Pos | Team | Pld | W | D | L | GF | GA | GD | Pts | Qualification or relegation |
|---|---|---|---|---|---|---|---|---|---|---|
| 1 | Milan (C) | 30 | 18 | 10 | 2 | 53 | 24 | +29 | 46 | Qualification to European Cup |
| 2 | Napoli | 30 | 13 | 11 | 6 | 34 | 24 | +10 | 37 | Qualified to Inter-Cities Fairs Cup |
| 3 | Juventus | 30 | 13 | 10 | 7 | 33 | 29 | +4 | 36 | Qualified to Inter-Cities Fairs Cup |
| 4 | Fiorentina | 30 | 13 | 9 | 8 | 35 | 23 | +12 | 35 | Qualified to Inter-Cities Fairs Cup |
| 5 | Internazionale | 30 | 13 | 7 | 10 | 46 | 34 | +12 | 33 | |
| 5 | Bologna | 30 | 11 | 11 | 8 | 30 | 23 | +7 | 33 | Qualified to Inter-Cities Fairs Cup |
| 7 | Torino | 30 | 12 | 8 | 10 | 44 | 31 | +13 | 32 | Qualification to Cup Winners' Cup |
| 7 | Varese | 30 | 12 | 8 | 10 | 28 | 27 | +1 | 32 | |
| 9 | Cagliari | 30 | 12 | 7 | 11 | 44 | 38 | +6 | 31 | |
| 10 | Sampdoria | 30 | 6 | 15 | 9 | 27 | 34 | −7 | 27 | |
| 10 | Roma | 30 | 7 | 13 | 10 | 25 | 35 | −10 | 27 | |
| 12 | Vicenza | 30 | 8 | 9 | 13 | 22 | 30 | −8 | 25 | |
| 12 | Atalanta | 30 | 10 | 5 | 15 | 26 | 42 | −16 | 25 | |
| 14 | SPAL (R) | 30 | 10 | 2 | 18 | 24 | 38 | −14 | 22 | Relegation to Serie B |
| 14 | Brescia (R) | 30 | 8 | 6 | 16 | 20 | 35 | −15 | 22 | Relegation to Serie B |
| 16 | Mantova (R) | 30 | 3 | 11 | 16 | 13 | 37 | −24 | 17 | Relegation to Serie B |

Source: Panini
(C) Champions; (R) Relegated

== Results ==
| Home \ Away | ATA | BOL | BRE | CAG | FIO | INT | JUV | LRV | MAN | MIL | NAP | ROM | SAM | SPA | TOR | VAR |
|---|---|---|---|---|---|---|---|---|---|---|---|---|---|---|---|---|
| Atalanta | | 1–0 | 1–3 | 2–1 | 0–3 | 3–1 | 0–0 | 1–0 | 2–0 | 0–3 | 1–0 | 2–1 | 1–0 | 1–0 | 1–1 | 4–0 |
| Bologna | 5–0 | | 0–3 | 2–1 | 0–1 | 2–1 | 0–0 | 2–0 | 1–0 | 1–1 | 1–2 | 1–0 | 0–0 | 2–3 | 2–0 | 1–0 |
| Brescia | 2–1 | 0–0 | | 2–1 | 1–1 | 2–0 | 0–1 | 0–0 | 0–1 | 1–2 | 0–0 | 1–0 | 1–2 | 0–1 | 0–5 | 0–1 |
| Cagliari | 2–1 | 1–1 | 3–0 | | 3–1 | 3–2 | 2–0 | 1–1 | 2–2 | 2–2 | 1–1 | 1–2 | 3–3 | 2–0 | 2–0 | 2–1 |
| Fiorentina | 1–0 | 1–0 | 0–1 | 1–0 | | 1–1 | 2–0 | 3–1 | 2–0 | 0–2 | 3–0 | 0–0 | 0–0 | 2–0 | 1–1 | 3–1 |
| Internazionale | 3–0 | 1–0 | 3–0 | 0–2 | 3–1 | | 0–0 | 1–0 | 3–0 | 1–1 | 1–2 | 1–1 | 2–0 | 2–0 | 1–0 | 1–0 |
| Juventus | 2–1 | 0–0 | 2–1 | 2–0 | 2–2 | 3–2 | | 1–0 | 3–1 | 1–2 | 1–1 | 0–1 | 3–1 | 2–0 | 0–4 | 3–0 |
| Vicenza | 4–1 | 1–1 | 0–1 | 3–1 | 1–0 | 2–1 | 0–2 | | 2–0 | 2–2 | 0–1 | 0–0 | 0–0 | 1–0 | 1–0 | 1–0 |
| Mantova | 1–0 | 0–0 | 1–0 | 0–1 | 1–2 | 0–0 | 0–0 | 1–1 | | 0–1 | 0–1 | 0–0 | 0–1 | 0–1 | 0–0 | 0–0 |
| Milan | 0–0 | 4–2 | 1–0 | 0–1 | 0–0 | 1–1 | 0–0 | 2–0 | 3–1 | | 2–1 | 3–0 | 2–0 | 3–2 | 2–1 | 1–0 |
| Napoli | 1–0 | 0–0 | 0–0 | 1–0 | 1–0 | 2–1 | 1–2 | 1–1 | 0–0 | 1–1 | | 2–0 | 1–1 | 1–0 | 2–2 | 5–0 |
| Roma | 1–1 | 0–0 | 2–0 | 2–3 | 2–1 | 2–6 | 0–0 | 0–0 | 2–2 | 1–1 | 2–1 | | 1–1 | 1–1 | 0–2 | 1–0 |
| Sampdoria | 0–0 | 1–2 | 1–0 | 1–1 | 1–1 | 2–2 | 1–1 | 1–0 | 3–0 | 0–3 | 1–1 | 1–1 | | 1–0 | 1–1 | 1–1 |
| SPAL | 1–0 | 1–3 | 3–1 | 1–0 | 1–0 | 1–2 | 0–1 | 3–0 | 1–0 | 1–4 | 1–2 | 0–1 | 1–0 | | 0–0 | 1–3 |
| Torino | 4–1 | 0–1 | 2–0 | 2–1 | 0–2 | 2–3 | 2–1 | 1–0 | 4–1 | 2–3 | 1–2 | 2–1 | 4–2 | 1–0 | | 0–0 |
| Varese | 2–0 | 0–0 | 0–0 | 2–1 | 0–0 | 1–0 | 5–0 | 2–0 | 1–1 | 2–1 | 1–0 | 2–0 | 1–0 | 2–0 | 0–0 | |

Source: Almanacco Illustrato del Calcio - La Storia 1898-2004, Panini Edizioni, Modena, September 2005 (in Italian)
Legend: Blue = home team win; Yellow = draw; Red = away team win.

== Top goalscorers ==
| Rank | Player | Club | Goals |
|---|---|---|---|
| 1 | (Italy) Pierino Prati | Milan | 15 |
| 2 | (Brazil) (Italy) José Altafini | Napoli | 13 |
| 2 | (France) Nestor Combin | Torino | 13 |
| 2 | (Italy) Luigi Riva | Cagliari | 13 |
| 5 | (Italy) Mario Maraschi | Fiorentina | 12 |
| 5 | (Italy) Giuseppe Savoldi | Atalanta | 12 |
| 7 | (Italy) Angelo Sormani | Milan | 11 |
| 7 | (Italy) Gianni Rivera | Milan | 11 |
| 7 | (Italy) Pietro Anastasi | Varese | 11 |
| 7 | (Italy) Angelo Domenghini | Internazionale | 11 |
| 11 | (Italy) Giuliano Taccola | Roma | 9 |

== Attendances ==
| # | Club | Average |
|---|---|---|
| 1 | Napoli | 66,541 |
| 2 | Milan | 46,742 |
| 3 | Internazionale | 46,699 |
| 4 | Roma | 35,902 |
| 5 | Torino | 27,182 |
| 6 | Juventus | 26,747 |
| 7 | Fiorentina | 26,399 |
| 8 | Bologna | 23,350 |
| 9 | Brescia | 20,091 |
| 10 | Sampdoria | 18,841 |
| 11 | Cagliari | 16,937 |
| 12 | Atalanta | 15,888 |
| 13 | Varese | 15,136 |
| 14 | SPAL | 14,159 |
| 15 | Vicenza | 12,520 |
| 16 | Mantova | 10,983 |

== References and sources ==
- Almanacco Illustrato del Calcio - La Storia 1898-2004, Panini Edizioni, Modena, September 2005
