= 1968–69 European Cup =

European football tournament

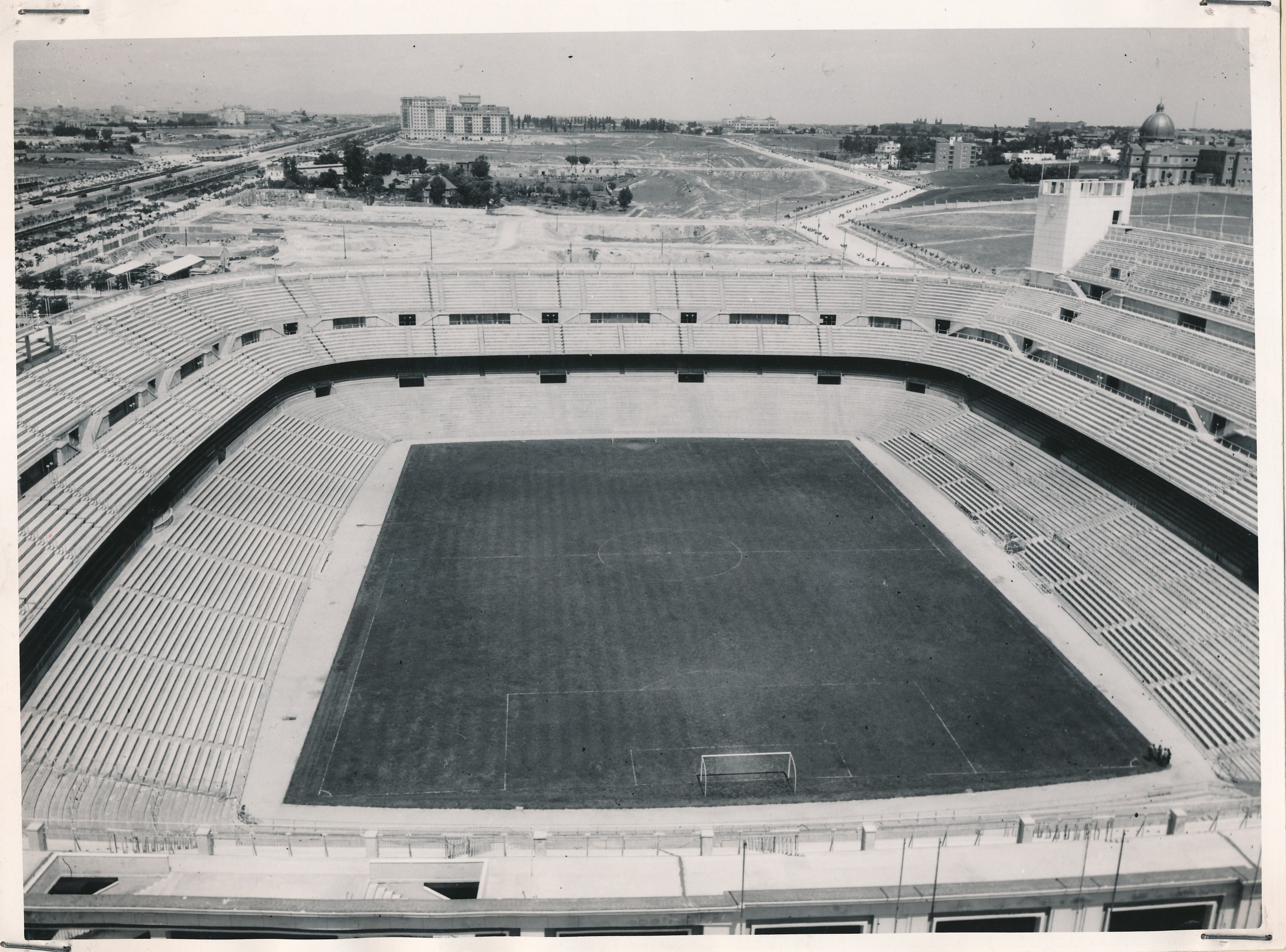
- Santiago Bernabéu Stadium in Madrid hosted the final.

Tournament details
- Dates: 18 September 1968 – 28 May 1969
- Teams: 32 (27 competed)

Final positions
- Champions: (Italy) Milan (2nd title)
- Runners-up: (Netherlands) Ajax

Tournament statistics
- Matches played: 52
- Goals scored: 176 (3.38 per match)
- Attendance: 1,738,847 (33,439 per match)
- Top scorer(s): Denis Law (Manchester United); 9 goals

The 1968–69 season of the European Cup football club tournament was won by Milan, who beat Ajax 4–1 in the final, giving Milan its first European Cup title since 1963, and its second overall. A number of Eastern Bloc clubs withdrew from the first two rounds when UEFA paired up all of the Eastern Bloc clubs against one another in the aftermath of the Soviet invasion of Czechoslovakia.

Substitutions of two players at any game time were allowed; obligatory match dates were introduced (two weeks between the legs) and fixed on Wednesdays; the away goal rule was extended to the first and second rounds.

Manchester United were the defending champions, but were eliminated by eventual champions Milan in the semi-finals.

== Teams ==
A total of 32 teams participated in the competition.

Thirty-one leagues were represented, with England being represented by its most recent champion, Manchester City, as well as defending European champion, Manchester United.

Real Madrid made their 14th consecutive appearance in the competition, while Anderlecht and Benfica each made their ninth appearances. Nürnberg and Steaua București both made their first appearances in the competition since the 1961-62 European Cup.

This year's competition included only five debutants: Denmark's AB, Cyprus's AEL Limassol, England's Manchester City, Norway's Rosenborg, and Czechoslovakia's Spartak Trnava. This was the smallest number to date.

(Austria) Rapid Wien (1st)	(Belgium) Anderlecht (1st)	(Bulgaria) Levski-Spartak (1st)	(Cyprus) AEL Limassol (1st)
(Czechoslovakia) Spartak Trnava (1st)	(Denmark) AB (1st)	(England) Manchester City (1st)	(England) Manchester United (2nd)^{TH}
(Finland) Reipas Lahti (1st)	(France) Saint-Étienne (1st)	(East Germany) Carl Zeiss Jena (1st)	(West Germany) Nürnberg (1st)
(Greece) AEK Athens (1st)	(Hungary) Ferencváros (1st)	(Iceland) Valur (1st)	(Republic of Ireland) Waterford (1st)
(Italy) Milan (1st)	(Luxembourg) Jeunesse Esch (1st)	(Malta) Floriana (1st)	(Netherlands) Ajax (1st)
(Northern Ireland) Glentoran (1st)	(Norway) Rosenborg (1st)	(Poland) Ruch Chorzów (1st)	(Portugal) Benfica (1st)
(Romania) Steaua București (1st)	(Scotland) Celtic (1st)	(Spain) Real Madrid (1st)	(Sweden) Malmö FF (1st)
(Switzerland) Zürich (1st)	(Turkey) Fenerbahçe (1st)	(Soviet Union) Dynamo Kyiv (1st)	(Socialist Federal Republic of Yugoslavia) Red Star Belgrade (1st)

== Bracket ==
First round
(West Germany) Nurnberg	1	0	1
(Netherlands) Ajax	1	4	5
(England) Manchester City	0	1	1
(Turkey) Fenerbahçe	0	2	2
(Iceland) Valur	0	1	1
(Portugal) Benfica	0	8	8
(Bulgaria) Levski Sofia	(w)
(Hungary) Ferencváros	(o)
(Malta) Floriana	1	0	1
(Finland) Reipas Lahti	1	2	3
(Romania) Steaua București	3	0	3
(Czechoslovakia) Spartak Trnava	1	4	5
(Greece) AEK Athens	3	2	5
(Luxembourg) Jeunesse Esch	0	3	3
(Switzerland) Zürich	1	2	3
(Denmark) AB	3	1	4
(Sweden) Malmö FF	2	1	3
(Italy) Milan	1	4	5
(Soviet Union) Dynamo Kyiv	(w)
(Poland) Ruch Chorzów	(o)
(France) Saint-Étienne	2	0	2
(Scotland) Celtic	0	4	4
(Socialist Federal Republic of Yugoslavia) Red Star Belgrade	(w)
(East Germany) Carl Zeiss Jena	(o)
(Republic of Ireland) Waterford	1	1	2
(England) Manchester United	3	7	10
(Belgium) Anderlecht	3	2	5
(Northern Ireland) Glentoran	0	2	2
(Norway) Rosenborg	1	3	4
(Austria) Rapid Wien	3	3	6
(Spain) Real Madrid	6	6	12
(Cyprus) AEL Limassol	0	0	0

Second round
(Netherlands) Ajax	2	2	4
(Turkey) Fenerbahçe	0	0	0
(Portugal) Benfica	Bye
(Finland) Reipas Lahti	1	1	2
(Czechoslovakia) Spartak Trnava	9	7	16
(Greece) AEK Athens	0	2	2
(Denmark) AB	0	0	0
(Italy) Milan	Bye
(Scotland) Celtic	5	1	6
(Socialist Federal Republic of Yugoslavia) Red Star Belgrade	1	1	2
(England) Manchester United	3	1	4
(Belgium) Anderlecht	0	3	3
(Austria) Rapid Wien	1	1	2
(Spain) Real Madrid	0	2	2

Quarter-finals
(Netherlands) Ajax	1	3	4 (3)
(Portugal) Benfica	3	1	4 (0)
(Czechoslovakia) Spartak Trnava	2	1	3
(Greece) AEK Athens	1	1	2
(Italy) Milan	0	1	1
(Scotland) Celtic	0	0	0
(England) Manchester United	3	0	3
(Austria) Rapid Wien	0	0	0

Semi-finals
(Netherlands) Ajax	3	0	3
(Czechoslovakia) Spartak Trnava	0	2	2
(Italy) Milan	2	0	2
(England) Manchester United	0	1	1

Final
(Netherlands) Ajax	1
(Italy) Milan	4

== First round ==
Team 1	Agg.	Team 2	1st leg	2nd leg
Malmö FF (Sweden)	3–5	(Italy) Milan	2–1	1–4
Dynamo Kyiv (Soviet Union)	(w/o)	(Poland) Ruch Chorzów	–	–
Saint-Étienne (France)	2–4	(Scotland) Celtic	2–0	0–4
Red Star Belgrade (Socialist Federal Republic of Yugoslavia)	(w/o)	(East Germany) Carl Zeiss Jena	–	–
Waterford (Republic of Ireland)	2–10	(England) Manchester United	1–3	1–7
Anderlecht (Belgium)	5–2	(Northern Ireland) Glentoran	3–0	2–2
Rosenborg (Norway)	4–6	(Austria) Rapid Wien	1–3	3–3
Real Madrid (Spain)	12–0	(Cyprus) AEL Limassol	6–0	6–0
Nürnberg (West Germany)	1–5	(Netherlands) Ajax	1–1	0–4
Manchester City (England)	1–2	(Turkey) Fenerbahçe	0–0	1–2
Valur (Iceland)	1–8	(Portugal) Benfica	0–0	1–8
Levski-Spartak (Bulgaria)	(w/o)	(Hungary) Ferencváros	–	–
Floriana (Malta)	1–3	(Finland) Reipas Lahti	1–1	0–2
Steaua București (Romania)	3–5	(Czechoslovakia) Spartak Trnava	3–1	0–4
AEK Athens (Greece)	5–3	(Luxembourg) Jeunesse Esch	3–0	2–3
Zürich (Switzerland)	3–4	(Denmark) AB	1–3	2–1

=== First leg ===
18 September 1968

Malmö FF (Sweden)	2–1	(Italy) Milan
Olsberg 45'; Elmstedt 50'	Report	Rivera 58'

Malmö Stadion, Malmö
Attendance: 23,118
Referee: Heinz Siebert (West Germany)

18 September 1968

Saint-Étienne (France)	2–0	(Scotland) Celtic
Keïta 15'; H. Revelli 36'	Report

Stade Geoffroy-Guichard, Saint-Étienne
Attendance: 34,403
Referee: Aníbal da Silva Oliveira (Portugal)

18 September 1968

Waterford (Republic of Ireland)	1–3	(England) Manchester United
Matthews 65'	Report	Law 8', 41', 55'

Lansdowne Road, Dublin
Attendance: 48,886
Referee: William Joseph Mullen (Scotland)

18 September 1968

Anderlecht (Belgium)	3–0	(Northern Ireland) Glentoran
Bergholtz 18'; Peeters 23'; Nordahl 87'	Report

Émile Versé Stadium, Anderlecht
Attendance: 18,963
Referee: Bruno de Marchi (Italy)

18 September 1968

Rosenborg (Norway)	1–3	(Austria) Rapid Wien
Iversen 16'	Report	Bjerregaard 28'; Kaltenbrunner 65'; Grausam 86'

Lerkendal Stadion, Trondheim
Attendance: 22,321
Referee: Kevin Howley (England)

18 September 1968

Real Madrid (Spain)	6–0	(Cyprus) AEL Limassol
Pirri 10', 14', 63'; Amancio 17'; Pérez 27'; Bueno 75'	Report

Santiago Bernabéu Stadium, Madrid
Attendance: 15,995
Referee: William Gow (Wales)

18 September 1968

Nürnberg (West Germany)	1–1	(Netherlands) Ajax
Volkert 6'	Report	Cruyff 80'

Städtisches Stadion, Nuremberg
Attendance: 45,090
Referee: Gilbert Droz (Switzerland)

18 September 1968

Manchester City (England)	0–0	(Turkey) Fenerbahçe
	Report

Maine Road, Manchester
Attendance: 38,840
Referee: Laurens van Ravens (Netherlands)

18 September 1968

Valur (Iceland)	0–0	(Portugal) Benfica
	Report

Laugardalsvöllur, Reykjavík
Attendance: 18,243
Referee: Patrick Graham (Republic of Ireland)

18 September 1968

Floriana (Malta)	1–1	(Finland) Reipas Lahti
Galea 37' (pen.)	Report	Aalto 28'

Empire Stadium, Gżira
Attendance: 10,162
Referee: Jim Finney (England)

18 September 1968

Steaua București (Romania)	3–1	(Czechoslovakia) Spartak Trnava
Creiniceanu 18'; Voinea 30'; Constantin 51'	Report	Kuna 75'

23 August Stadium, Bucharest
Attendance: 3,227
Referee: Christos Michas (Greece)

18 September 1968

AEK Athens (Greece)	3–0	(Luxembourg) Jeunesse Esch
Papaioannou 27'; Papageorgiou 58'; Karafeskos 60' (pen.)	Report

AEK Stadium, Athens
Attendance: 16,205
Referee: Fabio Monti (Italy)

18 September 1968

Zürich (Switzerland)	1–3	(Denmark) AB
Winiger 50'	Report	Hansen 22'; Wiberg 25'; Petersen 62'

Letzigrund, Zürich
Attendance: 17,000
Referee: Juan Gardeazábal Garay (Spain)

=== Second leg ===
2 October 1968

Milan (Italy)	4–1	(Sweden) Malmö FF
Prati 32', 69'; Sormani 62'; Rivera 88'	Report	Ljungberg 16'

San Siro, Milan
Attendance: 61,932
Referee: Roger Mâchin (France)

Milan won 5–3 on aggregate.

2 October 1968

Celtic (Scotland)	4–0	(France) Saint-Étienne
Gemmell 44' (pen.); Craig 59'; Chalmers 66'; McBride 87'	Report

Celtic Park, Glasgow
Attendance: 73,059
Referee: Zdeněk Valeš (Czechoslovakia)

Celtic won 4–2 on aggregate.

2 October 1968

Manchester United (England)	7–1	(Republic of Ireland) Waterford
Stiles 37'; Law 41', 47', 60', 71'; Burns 68'; Charlton 84'	Report	Casey 69'

Old Trafford, Manchester
Attendance: 41,750
Referee: Joaquim Fernandes Campos (Portugal)

Manchester United won 10–2 on aggregate.

2 October 1968

Glentoran (Northern Ireland)	2–2	(Belgium) Anderlecht
Morrow 27'; Johnston 55'	Report	Devrindt 24'; Bergholtz 58'

The Oval, Belfast
Attendance: 12,384
Referee: Jacques Colling (Luxembourg)

Anderlecht won 5–2 on aggregate.

2 October 1968

Rapid Wien (Austria)	3–3	(Norway) Rosenborg
Lindman 10', 80'; Kaltenbrunner 17'	Report	Iversen 21', 34', 87'

Praterstadion, Vienna
Attendance: 1,570
Referee: Andreas Kouniaides (Cyprus)

Rapid Wien won 6–4 on aggregate.

26 September 1968

AEL Limassol (Cyprus)	0–6	(Spain) Real Madrid
	Report	Velázquez 7', 10'; José Luis 9'; Veloso 84'; Ortega 86'; Zunzunegui 87'

Santiago Bernabéu Stadium, Madrid
Attendance: 20,075
Referee: Aníbal da Silva Oliveira (Portugal)

Real Madrid won 12–0 on aggregate.

2 October 1968

Ajax (Netherlands)	4–0	(West Germany) Nürnberg
Swart 22', 51'; Groot 86' (pen.); Cruyff 89'	Report

Olympisch Stadion, Amsterdam
Attendance: 54,579
Referee: John Adair (Northern Ireland)

Ajax won 5–1 on aggregate.

2 October 1968

Fenerbahçe (Turkey)	2–1	(England) Manchester City
Çevrim 48'; Altıparmak 76'	Report	Coleman 11'

Mithat Paşa Stadyumu, Istanbul
Attendance: 42,570
Referee: Ferdinand Marschall (Austria)

Fenerbahçe won 2–1 on aggregate.

2 October 1968

Benfica (Portugal)	8–1	(Iceland) Valur
Simões 4'; Jacinto 7'; Torres 11', 47', 79'; Eusébio 20'; Coluna 27'; José Augusto 48'	Report	Gunnarsson 68'

Estádio da Luz, Lisbon
Attendance: 24,389
Referee: Joseph Cassar-Naudi (Malta)

Benfica won 8–1 on aggregate.

2 October 1968

Reipas Lahti (Finland)	2–0	(Malta) Floriana
Holtari 56', 57'	Report

Olympia Stadium, Helsinki
Attendance: 2,212
Referee: Curt Nystrand (Sweden)

Reipas Lahti won 3–1 on aggregate.

2 October 1968

Spartak Trnava (Czechoslovakia)	4–0	(Romania) Steaua București
Švec 4'; Adamec 58', 76', 80'	Report

Spartak Stadium, Trnava
Attendance: 11,879
Referee: Rudolf Scheurer (Switzerland)

Spartak Trnava won 5–3 on aggregate.

2 October 1968

Jeunesse Esch (Luxembourg)	3–2	(Greece) AEK Athens
Hoffmann 6'; Drouet 40'; Langer 77'	Report	Ventouris 16', 33'

Stade de la Frontière, Esch-sur-Alzette
Attendance: 3,213
Referee: Joseph Hannet (Belgium)

AEK Athens won 5–3 on aggregate.

2 October 1968

AB (Denmark)	1–2	(Switzerland) Zürich
Petersen 53'	Report	Künzli 42', 80'

Københavns Idrætapark, Copenhagen
Attendance: 9,557
Referee: Malcolm Wright (Northern Ireland)

AB won 4–3 on aggregate.

== Second round ==
Team 1	Agg.	Team 2	1st leg	2nd leg
Milan (Italy)	Bye	–	–	–
Celtic (Scotland)	6–2	(Socialist Federal Republic of Yugoslavia) Red Star Belgrade	5–1	1–1
Manchester United (England)	4–3	(Belgium) Anderlecht	3–0	1–3
Rapid Wien (Austria)	2–2 (a)	(Spain) Real Madrid	1–0	1–2
Ajax (Netherlands)	4–0	(Turkey) Fenerbahçe	2–0	2–0
Benfica (Portugal)	Bye	–	–	–
Reipas Lahti (Finland)	2–16	(Czechoslovakia) Spartak Trnava	1–9	1–7
AEK Athens (Greece)	2–0	(Denmark) AB	0–0	2–0

=== First leg ===
13 November 1968

Celtic (Scotland)	5–1	(Socialist Federal Republic of Yugoslavia) Red Star Belgrade
Murdoch 3'; Johnstone 46', 81'; Lennox 48'; Wallace 74'	Report	Lazarević 39'

Celtic Park, Glasgow
Attendance: 65,248
Referee: Alfred Ott (West Germany)

13 November 1968

Manchester United (England)	3–0	(Belgium) Anderlecht
Kidd 52'; Law 70', 78'	Report

Old Trafford, Manchester
Attendance: 51,008
Referee: Aníbal da Silva Oliveira (Portugal)

20 November 1968

Rapid Wien (Austria)	1–0	(Spain) Real Madrid
Kaltenbrunner 55'	Report

Praterstadion, Vienna
Attendance: 44,799
Referee: Josip Drago Horvat (Yugoslavia)

13 November 1968

Ajax (Netherlands)	2–0	(Turkey) Fenerbahçe
Nuninga 14'; Muller 74'	Report

Olympisch Stadion, Amsterdam
Attendance: 54,812
Referee: Eric Jennings (England)

20 November 1968

Reipas Lahti (Finland)	1–9	(Czechoslovakia) Spartak Trnava
Hyvärinen 90'	Report	Hagara 14'; Kabát 22', 80'; Švec 25', 60'; Kuna 52'; Martinkovič 57', 65'; Adamec 65'

Praterstadion, Vienna
Attendance: 6,000
Referee: Paul Schiller (Austria)

The home leg of Reipas Lahti was played in Vienna just before the Rapid Wien–Real Madrid match.

13 November 1968

AEK Athens (Greece)	0–0	(Denmark) AB
	Report

AEK Stadium, Athens
Attendance: 8,161
Referee: Ferdinand Marschall (Austria)

=== Second leg ===
27 November 1968

Red Star Belgrade (Socialist Federal Republic of Yugoslavia)	1–1	(Scotland) Celtic
Ostojić 90'	Report	Wallace 72'

Red Star Stadium, Belgrade
Attendance: 17,625
Referee: Francesco Francescon (Italy)

Celtic won 6–2 on aggregate.

27 November 1968

Anderlecht (Belgium)	3–1	(England) Manchester United
Mulder 18'; Bergholtz 38', 78'	Report	Sartori 8'

Émile Versé Stadium, Brussels
Attendance: 32,572
Referee: José María Ortiz de Mendíbil (Spain)

Manchester United won 4–3 on aggregate.

4 December 1968

Real Madrid (Spain)	2–1	(Austria) Rapid Wien
Velázquez 41'; Pirri 83'	Report	Bjerregaard 48'

Santiago Bernabéu Stadium, Madrid
Attendance: 39,228
Referee: Gilbert Droz (Switzerland)

Rapid Wien won 2–2 on away goals.

27 November 1968

Fenerbahçe (Turkey)	0–2	(Netherlands) Ajax
	Report	Keizer 55'; Nuninga 88'

Mithat Paşa Stadyumu, Istanbul
Attendance: 33,863
Referee: Iosif Ritter (Romania)

Ajax won 4–0 on aggregate.

27 November 1968

Spartak Trnava (Czechoslovakia)	7–1	(Finland) Reipas Lahti
Hagara 10'; Dobiaš 21', 49' (pen.), 64'; Kuna 26'; Adamec 38'; Hrušecký 58'	Report	Niskakoski 71'

Spartak Stadium, Trnava
Attendance: 5,766
Referee: Laurens van Ravens (Netherlands)

Spartak Trnava won 16–2 on aggregate.

27 November 1968

AB (Denmark)	0–2	(Greece) AEK Athens
	Report	Stamatiadis 25'; Papaioannou 81'

Københavns Idrætspark, Copenhagen
Attendance: 11,471
Referee: Robert Holley Davidson (Scotland)

AEK Athens won 2–0 on aggregate.

== Quarter-finals ==
Team 1	Agg.	Team 2	1st leg	2nd leg	Play-off
Milan (Italy)	1–0	(Scotland) Celtic	0–0	1–0	
Manchester United (England)	3–0	(Austria) Rapid Wien	3–0	0–0	
Ajax (Netherlands)	4–4	(Portugal) Benfica	1–3	3–1	3–0
Spartak Trnava (Czechoslovakia)	3–2	(Greece) AEK Athens	2–1	1–1	

=== First leg ===
19 February 1969

Milan (Italy)	0–0	(Scotland) Celtic
	Report

San Siro, Milan
Attendance: 63,538
Referee: Kurt Waldemar Tschenscher (West Germany)

26 February 1969

Manchester United (England)	3–0	(Austria) Rapid Wien
Best 44', 70'; Morgan 70'	Report

Old Trafford, Manchester
Attendance: 62,726
Referee: Božidar Botić (Yugoslavia)

12 February 1969

Ajax (Netherlands)	1–3	(Portugal) Benfica
Danielsson 48'	Report	Santos 31' (pen.); Torres 36'; José Augusto 61'

Olympisch Stadion, Amsterdam
Attendance: 55,150
Referee: Robert Holley Davidson (Scotland)

26 February 1969
16:30 EET

Spartak Trnava (Czechoslovakia)	2–1	(Greece) AEK Athens
Jarábek 25'; Kabát 44'	Report	Sevastopoulos 60'

Spartak Stadium, Trnava
Attendance: 10,747
Referee: Gilbert Droz (Switzerland)

=== Second leg ===
12 March 1969

Celtic (Scotland)	0–1	(Italy) Milan
	Report	Prati 12'

Celtic Park, Glasgow
Attendance: 76,415
Referee: José María Ortiz de Mendíbil (Spain)

Milan won 1–0 on aggregate.

5 March 1969

Rapid Wien (Austria)	0–0	(England) Manchester United
	Report

Praterstadion, Vienna
Attendance: 50,234
Referee: Laurens van Ravens (Netherlands)

Manchester United won 3–0 on aggregate.

19 February 1969

Benfica (Portugal)	1–3	(Netherlands) Ajax
Torres 70'	Report	Danielsson 9'; Cruyff 12', 32'

Estádio da Luz, Lisbon
Attendance: 31,019
Referee: Antonio Sbardella (Italy)

4–4 on aggregate. Tie is decided by a tie-breaker match on neutral ground.

12 March 1969

AEK Athens (Greece)	1–1	(Czechoslovakia) Spartak Trnava
Papaioannou 77'	Report	Švec 22'

AEK Stadium, Athens
Attendance: 29,842
Referee: Concetto Lo Bello (Italy)

Spartak Trnava won 3–2 on aggregate.

=== Tie-breakers ===
5 March 1969

Ajax (Netherlands)	3–0 (a.e.t.)	(Portugal) Benfica
Cruyff 93'; Danielsson 105', 108'	Report

Stade Olympique Yves-du-Manoir, Paris
Attendance: 63,638
Referee: Roger Mâchin (France)

Ajax win the tie-breaker.

== Semi-finals ==
Team 1	Agg.	Team 2	1st leg	2nd leg
Milan (Italy)	2–1	(England) Manchester United	2–0	0–1
Ajax (Netherlands)	3–2	(Czechoslovakia) Spartak Trnava	3–0	0–2

=== First leg ===
23 April 1969

Milan (Italy)	2–0	(England) Manchester United
Sormani 33'; Hamrin 49'	Report

San Siro, Milan
Attendance: 80,050
Referee: Josef Krnávek (Czechoslovakia)

13 April 1969

Ajax (Netherlands)	3–0	(Czechoslovakia) Spartak Trnava
Cruyff 25'; Swart 50'; Keizer 65'	Report

Olympisch Stadion, Amsterdam
Attendance: 55,490
Referee: Eric Jennings (England)

=== Second leg ===
15 May 1969

Manchester United (England)	1–0	(Italy) Milan
Charlton 70'	Report

Old Trafford, Manchester
Attendance: 63,103
Referee: Roger Mâchin (France)

Milan won 2–1 on aggregate.

24 April 1969

Spartak Trnava (Czechoslovakia)	2–0	(Netherlands) Ajax
Kuna 28', 49'	Report

Spartak Stadium, Trnava
Attendance: 22,938
Referee: Ferdinand Marschall (Austria)

Ajax won 3–2 on aggregate.

== Final ==
28 May 1969

Ajax (Netherlands)	1–4	(Italy) Milan
Vasović 60' (pen.)	Report	Prati 7', 40', 75'; Sormani 67'

Santiago Bernabéu Stadium, Madrid
Attendance: 31,782
Referee: José María Ortiz de Mendíbil (Spain)

== Top scorers ==
The top scorers from the 1968–69 European Cup are as follows:

Rank	Name	Team	Goals
1	(Scotland) Denis Law	(England) Manchester United	9
2	(Netherlands) Johan Cruyff	(Netherlands) Ajax	6
2	(Italy) Pierino Prati	(Italy) Milan	6
4	(Czechoslovakia) Jozef Adamec	(Czechoslovakia) Spartak Trnava	5
4	(Czechoslovakia) Ladislav Kuna	(Czechoslovakia) Spartak Trnava	5
4	(Portugal) José Augusto Torres	(Portugal) Benfica	5
7	(Netherlands) Gerard Bergholtz	(Belgium) Anderlecht	4
7	(Sweden) Inge Danielsson	(Netherlands) Ajax	4
7	(Norway) Odd Iversen	(Norway) Rosenborg	4
7	(Spain) Pirri	(Spain) Real Madrid	4
7	(Czechoslovakia) Valér Švec	(Czechoslovakia) Spartak Trnava	4
