= 1961–62 European Cup =

European football tournament

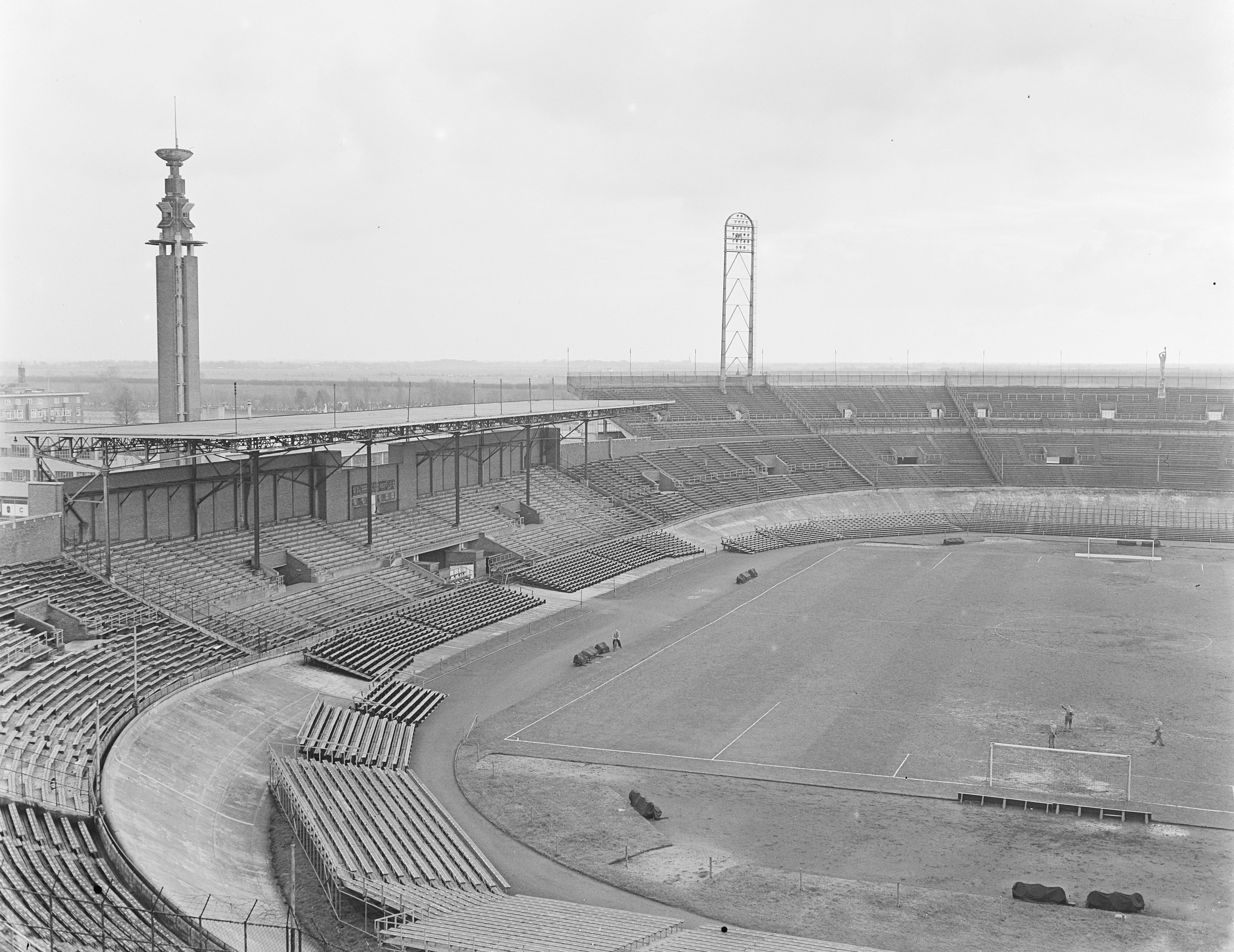
- The Olympic Stadium in Amsterdam hosted the final.

Tournament details
- Dates: 23 August 1961 – 2 May 1962
- Teams: 29 (from 28 associations)

Final positions
- Champions: (Portugal) Benfica (2nd title)
- Runners-up: (Spain) Real Madrid

Tournament statistics
- Matches played: 56
- Goals scored: 222 (3.96 per match)
- Attendance: 2,009,001 (35,875 per match)
- Top scorer(s): Heinz Strehl (1. FC Nürnberg); 8 goals

The 1961–62 European Cup was the seventh season of the European Cup, UEFA's premier club football tournament. The competition was won by Benfica for the second time in a row, beating Real Madrid 5–3 in the final at the Olympisch Stadion, Amsterdam, on 2 May 1962. This outcome meant that Real Madrid became the first team to win and lose European Cup final. Ferenc Puskás scored his second hat-trick in the final of the competition, and as of May 27th, 2026, is the only player to achieve this feat, as well as being the only final hat-trick scorer to end up on the losing side.

Malta entered its champion for the first time this season.

== Teams ==
A total of 29 teams participated in the competition.

For the first time since European Cup inaugural season Spain was represented by only one team – ever-present Real Madrid. Benfica qualified as title holders and since they were also Portuguese champions, runners-up Sporting CP were invited. CDNA Sofia appeared in the sixth edition of European Cup, with only Real Madrid having more appearances in the competition.

Austria Wien, Boldklubben 1913, Tottenham Hotspur, Valkeakosken Haka, Monaco, Hibernians, Feyenoord, Górnik Zabrze and 1. FC Nürnberg made their debut in the competition, while Juventus, Panathinaikos and Fredrikstad returned to the tournament from previous edition.

Servette and Partizan returned to the tournament for the first time since 1956, while Spora Luxembourg and Vasas returned to the competition after five and four years, respectively.

All participants were their respective associations champions, except for Boldklubben 1913, IFK Göteborg and Sporting CP. The first two were leading their respective leagues in spring, but finished third in autumn of 1961.

Austria Wien (1st)	(Belgium) Standard Liège (1st)	(Bulgaria) CDNA Sofia (1st)	(Czechoslovakia) Dukla Prague (1st)
(Denmark) Boldklubben 1913 (3rd)	(East Germany) Vorwärts Berlin (1st)	(England) Tottenham Hotspur (1st)	(Finland) Valkeakosken Haka (1st)
(France) Monaco (1st)	(Greece) Panathinaikos (1st)	(Hungary) Vasas (1st)	(Italy) Juventus (1st)
Spora Luxembourg (1st)	(Malta) Hibernians (1st)	(Netherlands) Feyenoord (1st)	(Northern Ireland) Linfield (1st)
(Norway) Fredrikstad (1st)	(Poland) Górnik Zabrze (1st)	(Portugal) Benfica (1st)^{TH}	(Portugal) Sporting CP (2nd)
(Republic of Ireland) Drumcondra (1st)	(Romania) Steaua București (1st)	(Scotland) Rangers (1st)	(Spain) Real Madrid (1st)
(Sweden) IFK Göteborg (3rd)	(Switzerland) Servette (1st)	(Turkey) Fenerbahçe (1st)	(West Germany) 1. FC Nürnberg (1st)
(Socialist Federal Republic of Yugoslavia) Partizan (1st)

== Preliminary round ==
Location of teams in the 1961–62 European Cup

The draw for the preliminary round took place in Copenhagen, Denmark, on 4 July 1961. As title holders, Benfica received a bye, and the remaining 28 teams were grouped geographically into two pots. The first team drawn in each pot also received a bye, while the remaining clubs would play the first round in September.

	Pot 1 Northern Europe	Pot 2 Southern Europe
Drawn	Northern Ireland; England; West Germany; East Germany; Poland; Norway; Sweden; Denmark; Netherlands; France; Republic of Ireland; Belgium; Luxembourg; Scotland	Spain; Portugal; Switzerland; Austria; Romania; Bulgaria; Greece; Czechoslovakia; Hungary; Yugoslavia; Italy; Malta
Byes	(Finland) Valkeakosken Haka	(Turkey) Fenerbahçe

The calendar was decided by the involved teams, with all matches to be played by 30 September.

Team 1	Agg.	Team 2	1st leg	2nd leg
Steaua București (Romania)	0–2	Austria Wien	0–0	0–2
1. FC Nürnberg (West Germany)	9–1	(Republic of Ireland) Drumcondra	5–0	4–1
Servette (Switzerland)	7–1	(Malta) Hibernians	5–0	2–1
CDNA Sofia (Bulgaria)	5–6	(Czechoslovakia) Dukla Prague	4–4	1–2
IFK Göteborg (Sweden)	2–11	(Netherlands) Feyenoord	0–3	2–8
Górnik Zabrze (Poland)	5–10	(England) Tottenham Hotspur	4–2	1–8
Standard Liège (Belgium)	4–1	(Norway) Fredrikstad	2–1	2–0
Vorwärts Berlin (East Germany)	3–0	(Northern Ireland) Linfield	3–0	– (Note: The second leg was scratched and Vorwärts Berlin were advanced to the first round as Linfield were unable to arrange an alternate venue after UK immigration officials refused to issue the East German team visas to enter the country.)
Monaco (France)	4–6	(Scotland) Rangers	2–3	2–3
Sporting CP (Portugal)	1–3	(Socialist Federal Republic of Yugoslavia) Partizan	1–1	0–2
Panathinaikos (Greece)	2–3	(Italy) Juventus	1–1	1–2
Spora Luxembourg	2–15	(Denmark) Boldklubben 1913	0–6	2–9
Vasas (Hungary)	1–5	(Spain) Real Madrid	0–2	1–3

=== First leg ===
23 August 1961
18:30 CET

1. FC Nürnberg (Germany)	5–0	(Republic of Ireland) Drumcondra
Müller 10'; Strehl 15', 23'; Gettinger 46', 74'	Report

Städtisches Stadion, Nuremberg
Attendance: 30,645
Referee: Pieter Paulus Roomer (Netherlands)

30 August 1961
18:00 CET

Vorwärts Berlin (East Germany)	3–0	(Northern Ireland) Linfield
Kohle 10', 38'; Wirth 52'	Report

Friedrich-Ludwig-Jahn-Sportpark, Berlin
Attendance: 15,626
Referee: Johan Einar Boström (Sweden)

5 September 1961

Monaco (France)	2–3	(Scotland) Rangers
Hess 61'; Douis 75' (pen.)	Report	Baxter 9'; Scott 25', 85'

Stade Louis II, Monaco
Attendance: 6,024
Referee: Daniel Zariquiegui Izco (Spain)

6 September 1961
17:30 CET

Vasas (Hungary)	0–2	(Spain) Real Madrid
	Report	Tejada 6', 28'

Népstadion, Budapest
Attendance: 85,000
Referee: Marcel Bois (France)

6 September 1961
20:30 CET

Standard Liège (Belgium)	2–1	(Norway) Fredrikstad
Dierendonck 5'; Paeschen 77'	Report	Bergersen 60'

Stade de Sclessin, Liège
Attendance: 23,546
Referee: Reginald Leafe (England)

6 September 1961
21:00 CET

IFK Göteborg (Sweden)	0–3	(Netherlands) Feyenoord
	Report	Bouwmeester 31'; Bennaars 32'; Temming 41'

Nya Ullevi, Gothenburg
Attendance: 5,431
Referee: Einar Poulsen (Denmark)

6 September 1961
21:30 CET

Servette (Switzerland)	5–0	(Malta) Hibernians
Robbiani 3', 30'; Németh 20'; Georgy 57' (pen.), 70'	Report

Stade des Charmilles, Geneva
Attendance: 14,739
Referee: Cesare Jonni (Italy)

6 September 1961

CDNA Sofia (Bulgaria)	4–4	(Czechoslovakia) Dukla Prague
Rankov 31'; Rakarov 49'; Romanov 63', 84'	Report	Jelínek 36'; Kučera 42'; Dvořák 52'; Adamec 60'

Vasil Levski National Stadium, Sofia
Attendance: 23,000
Referee: Bronisław Bilak (Poland)

7 September 1961

Spora Luxembourg	0–6	(Denmark) Boldklubben 1913
	Report	Løfqvist 6'; Remy 36' (o.g.); Bruun 37'; Rasmussen 50', 66'; Grønning 55'

Stade Municipal, Luxembourg City
Attendance: 3,000
Referee: Günther Ternieden (West Germany)

13 September 1961
18:00 CET

Górnik Zabrze (Poland)	4–2	(England) Tottenham Hotspur
Norman 8' (o.g.); Musiałek 20'; Wilczek 40'; Pohl 48'	Report	Jones 70'; Dyson 73'

Stadion Śląski, Chorzów
Attendance: 55,000
Referee: Arthur Blavier (Belgium)

13 September 1961
23:45 CET

Sporting CP (Portugal)	1–1	(Socialist Federal Republic of Yugoslavia) Partizan
Lúcio 87'	Report	Vukelić 68'

Estádio José Alvalade, Lisbon
Attendance: 16,302
Referee: Josef Gulde (Switzerland)

20 September 1961
16:30 CET

Panathinaikos (Greece)	1–1	(Italy) Juventus
Papaemmanouil 64'	Report	Mora 42'

Leoforos Alexandras Stadium, Athens
Attendance: 23,904
Referee: Karol Galba (Czechoslovakia)

21 September 1961
16:00 CET

Steaua București (Romania)	0–0	Austria Wien
	Report

Stadionul August 23, Bucharest
Attendance: 41,743
Referee: Konstantin Zečević (Yugoslavia)

=== Second leg ===
12 September 1961
21:30 CET

Rangers (Scotland)	3–2	(France) Monaco
Christie 47', 68'; Scott 84'	Report	Hess 18', 77'

Ibrox Park, Glasgow
Attendance: 67,501
Referee: Juan Gardeazábal (Spain)

Rangers won 6–4 on aggregate.

13 September 1961
15:45 CET

Dukla Prague (Czechoslovakia)	2–1	(Bulgaria) CDNA Sofia
Kučera 53'; Šafránek 69'	Report	Rankov 43'

Stadion Juliska, Prague
Attendance: 13,142
Referee: Grzegorz Placik (Poland)

Dukla Prague won 6–5 on aggregate.

13 September 1961
21:15 CET

Feyenoord (Netherlands)	8–2	(Sweden) IFK Göteborg
Temming 3', 88'; Bennaars 9', 80'; Schouten 20'; Bouwmeester 44', 58', 59'	Report	Danielsson 70'; Svensson 73'

De Kuip, Rotterdam
Attendance: 33,577
Referee: Carl Jørgensen (Denmark)

Feyenoord won 11–2 on aggregate.

13 September 1961
21:45 CET

Drumcondra (Republic of Ireland)	1–4	(Germany) 1. FC Nürnberg
Fullam 16'	Report	Strehl 15', 47', 52', 65'

Tolka Park, Dublin
Attendance: 10,997
Referee: Andries van Leeuwen (Netherlands)

1. FC Nürnberg won 9–1 on aggregate.

13 September 1961

Boldklubben 1913 (Denmark)	9–2	Spora Luxembourg
Andersen 38' (pen.), 76', 77'; Løfqvist 45', 56', 61', 82', 86'; Rasmussen 63'	Report	Bruns 10'; Leer 30'

Odense Stadion, Odense
Attendance: 9,643
Referee: Werner Treichel (West Germany)

Boldklubben 1913 won 15–2 on aggregate.

20 September 1961
16:45 CET

Partizan (Socialist Federal Republic of Yugoslavia)	2–0	(Portugal) Sporting CP
Radović 18'; Vislavski 87'	Report

Stadion JNA, Belgrade
Attendance: 19,755
Referee: Daniel Mellet (Switzerland)

Partizan won 3–1 on aggregate.

20 September 1961
20:30 CET

Fredrikstad (Norway)	0–2	(Belgium) Standard Liège
	Report	Claessen 68', 79'

Bislett Stadion, Oslo
Attendance: 25,074
Referee: Ken Aston (England)

Standard Liège won 4–1 on aggregate.

20 September 1961
21:30 CET

Real Madrid (Spain)	3–1	(Hungary) Vasas
Di Stéfano 11', 57'; Tejada 89'	Report	Pál 10'

Santiago Bernabéu, Madrid
Attendance: 70,000
Referee: Maurice Guigue (France)

Real Madrid won 5–1 on aggregate.

20 September 1961

Hibernians (Malta)	1–2	(Switzerland) Servette
Sultana 60'	Report	Wüthrich 42'; Robbiani 78'

Empire Stadium, Gżira
Attendance: 4,853
Referee: Gennaro Marchese (Italy)

Servette won 7–1 on aggregate.

20 September 1961

Tottenham Hotspur (England)	8–1	(Poland) Górnik Zabrze
Blanchflower 8' (pen.); Jones 20', 41', 43'; Smith 45', 70'; Dyson 78'; White 85'	Report	Pohl 28'

White Hart Lane, London
Attendance: 56,737
Referee: Lucien Van Nuffel (Belgium)

Tottenham Hotspur won 10–5 on aggregate.

27 September 1961
22:30 CET

Juventus (Italy)	2–1	(Greece) Panathinaikos
Nicolè 20'; Rossano 25'	Report	Holevas 62' (pen.)

Stadio Comunale, Turin
Attendance: 19,452
Referee: Alois Obtulovic (Czechoslovakia)

Juventus won 3–2 on aggregate.

28 September 1961
21:30 CET

Austria Wien	2–0	(Romania) Steaua București
Stotz 38' (pen.); Nemec 40'	Report

Praterstadion, Vienna
Attendance: 38,490
Referee: Branko Tesanić (Yugoslavia)

Austria Wien won 2–0 on aggregate.

28 September 1961

Linfield (Northern Ireland)	Cancelled	(East Germany) Vorwärts Berlin
	Report

Windsor Park, Belfast

Vorwärts Berlin won 3–0 on aggregate.

== Bracket ==
First round
(Turkey) Fenerbahçe	1	0	1
(Germany) 1. FC Nürnberg	2	1	3
Austria Wien	1	1	2
(Portugal) Benfica	1	5	6
(Switzerland) Servette	4	0	4
(Czech Republic) Dukla Prague	3	2	5
(Netherlands) Feyenoord	1	1	2
(England) Tottenham Hotspur	3	1	4
(Socialist Federal Republic of Yugoslavia) Partizan	1	0	1
(Italy) Juventus	2	5	7
(Denmark) Boldklubben 1913	0	0	0
(Spain) Real Madrid	3	9	12
(Belgium) Standard Liège	5	2	7
(Finland) Valkeakosken Haka	1	0	1
(East Germany) Vorwärts Berlin	1	1	2
(Scotland) Rangers	2	4	6

Quarter-finals
(Germany) 1. FC Nürnberg	3	0	3
(Portugal) Benfica	1	6	7
(Czech Republic) Dukla Prague	1	1	2
(England) Tottenham Hotspur	0	4	4
(Italy) Juventus	0	1	1 (1)
(Spain) Real Madrid	1	0	1 (3)
(Belgium) Standard Liège	4	0	4
(Scotland) Rangers	1	2	3

Semi-finals
(Portugal) Benfica	3	1	4
(England) Tottenham Hotspur	1	2	3
(Spain) Real Madrid	4	2	6
(Belgium) Standard Liège	0	0	0

Final
(Portugal) Benfica	5
(Spain) Real Madrid	3

== First round ==
Team 1	Agg.	Team 2	1st leg	2nd leg
Fenerbahçe (Turkey)	1–3	(West Germany) 1. FC Nürnberg	1–2	0–1
Austria Wien	2–6	(Portugal) Benfica	1–1	1–5
Servette (Switzerland)	4–5	(Czechoslovakia) Dukla Prague	4–3	0–2
Feyenoord (Netherlands)	2–4	(England) Tottenham Hotspur	1–3	1–1
Boldklubben 1913 (Denmark)	0–12	(Spain) Real Madrid	0–3	0–9
Partizan (Socialist Federal Republic of Yugoslavia)	1–7	(Italy) Juventus	1–2	0–5
Standard Liège (Belgium)	7–1	(Finland) Valkeakosken Haka	5–1	2–0
Vorwärts Berlin (East Germany)	2–6	(Scotland) Rangers	1–2	1–4

=== First leg ===
18 October 1961
19:30 CET

Boldklubben 1913 (Denmark)	0–3	(Spain) Real Madrid
	Report	Puskás 15', 83'; Tejada 87'

Odense Stadion, Odense
Attendance: 27,587
Referee: Lucien Van Nuffel (Belgium)

18 October 1961

Fenerbahçe (Turkey)	1–2	(West Germany) 1. FC Nürnberg
Bartu 65'	Report	Flachenecker 53'; Strehl 56'

Mithatpaşa Stadyumu, Istanbul
Attendance: 13,743
Referee: János Pósa Polareczki (Hungary)

24 October 1961
19:00 CET

Standard Liège (Belgium)	5–1	(Finland) Valkeakosken Haka
Dierendonck 12'; Claessen 33', 61', 75'; Paeschen 78'	Report	Kumpulampi 76'

Stade de Sclessin, Liège
Attendance: 25,391
Referee: Valdemar Hansen (Denmark)

31 October 1961
19:30 CET

Austria Wien	1–1	(Portugal) Benfica
Stark 69'	Report	Águas 31'

Praterstadion, Vienna
Attendance: 78,833
Referee: Joseph Barbéran (France)

1 November 1961
20:15 CET

Feyenoord (Netherlands)	1–3	(England) Tottenham Hotspur
Kreijermaat 61'	Report	Dyson 42'; Saul 48', 73'

De Kuip, Rotterdam
Attendance: 61,700
Referee: Leif Gulliksen (Norway)

5 November 1961

Servette (Switzerland)	4–3	(Czechoslovakia) Dukla Prague
Fatton 19', 67', 88'; Robbiani 84'	Report	Adamec 7', 50'; Vacenovský 37'

Stade des Charmilles, Geneva
Attendance: 25,644
Referee: Gino Rigato (Italy)

8 November 1961
14:15 CET

Partizan (Socialist Federal Republic of Yugoslavia)	1–2	(Italy) Juventus
Vasović 76'	Report	Nicolè 35'; Rosa 73'

Stadion JNA, Belgrade
Attendance: 23,472
Referee: Victor Schicker (Switzerland)

15 November 1961

Vorwärts Berlin (East Germany)	1–2	(Scotland) Rangers
Kohle 27'	Report	Caldow 28' (pen.); Brand 43'

Friedrich-Ludwig-Jahn-Sportpark, Berlin
Attendance: 14,268
Referee: Johan Heinrich Martens (Netherlands)

=== Second leg ===
25 October 1961
20:45 CET

Real Madrid (Spain)	9–0	(Denmark) Boldklubben 1913
Puskás 7'; Del Sol 25', 43'; Di Stéfano 29', 35', 75'; Gento 55', 57'; Sánchez 88'	Report

Santiago Bernabéu, Madrid
Attendance: 54,000
Referee: Raymond Lespineux (Belgium)

Real Madrid won 12–0 on aggregate.

2 November 1961

Valkeakosken Haka (Finland)	0–2	(Belgium) Standard Liège
	Report	Semmeling 78'; Niittymäki 87' (o.g.)

Tehtaan kenttä, Valkeakoski
Attendance: 2,401
Referee: Jarl Hansen (Denmark)

Standard Liège won 7–1 on aggregate.

8 November 1961
22:45 CET

Benfica (Portugal)	5–1	Austria Wien
Santana 4', 82'; Águas 36', 44'; Eusébio 68'	Report	Fernandes 80' (o.g.)

Estádio da Luz, Lisbon
Attendance: 50,000
Referee: Marcel Bois (France)

Benfica won 6–2 on aggregate.

15 November 1961
15:00 CET

Juventus (Italy)	5–0	(Socialist Federal Republic of Yugoslavia) Partizan
Nicolè 1'; Mora 36', 61'; Rosa 55'; Stacchini 67'	Report

Stadio Comunale, Turin
Attendance: 14,347
Referee: Josef Gulde (Switzerland)

Juventus won 7–1 on aggregate.

15 November 1961
20:45 CET

Tottenham Hotspur (England)	1–1	(Netherlands) Feyenoord
Dyson 10'	Report	Bennaars 7'

White Hart Lane, London
Attendance: 61,957
Referee: Birger Nilsen (Norway)

Tottenham Hotspur won 4–2 on aggregate.

22 November 1961
13:30 CET

Dukla Prague (Czechoslovakia)	2–0	(Switzerland) Servette
Kučera 24', 27'	Report

Stadion Juliska, rague
Attendance: 9,585
Referee: Giuseppe Adami (Italy)

Dukla Prague won 5–4 on aggregate.

23 November 1961

Rangers (Scotland)	4–1	(East Germany) Vorwärts Berlin
Henderson 37'; Kalinke 51' (o.g.); McMillan 65', 81'	Report	Caldow 67' (o.g.)

Malmö Stadion, Malmö, Sweden (Note: The Rangers–Vorwärts Berlin tie was scheduled to be played at Ibrox Park in Glasgow, but was moved to the Malmö Stadion in Malmö, Sweden after the East German club were again refused visas to enter the UK. The original match in Malmö was abandoned due to heavy fog with Rangers leading 1–0, and the match was replayed the following morning.)
Attendance: 3,012
Referee: Bertil Lööw (Sweden)

Rangers won 6–2 on aggregate.

3 December 1961

1. FC Nürnberg (Germany)	1–0	(Turkey) Fenerbahçe
Wild 72'	Report

Städtisches Stadion, Nuremberg
Attendance: 42,641
Referee: Andor Dorogi (Hungary)

1. FC Nürnberg won 3–1 on aggregate.

== Quarter-finals ==
Team 1	Agg.	Team 2	1st leg	2nd leg	Play-off
1. FC Nürnberg (West Germany)	3–7	(Portugal) Benfica	3–1	0–6	
Dukla Prague (Czechoslovakia)	2–4	(England) Tottenham Hotspur	1–0	1–4	
Juventus (Italy)	1–1	(Spain) Real Madrid	0–1	1–0	1–3
Standard Liège (Belgium)	4–3	(Scotland) Rangers	4–1	0–2	

=== First leg ===
1 February 1962
15:00 CET

1. FC Nürnberg (Germany)	3–1	(Portugal) Benfica
Flachenecker 31', 85'; Strehl 40'	Report	Cavém 10'

Städtisches Stadion, Nuremberg
Attendance: 41,010
Referee: Thomas Wharton (Scotland)

7 February 1962
19:30 CET

Standard Liège (Belgium)	4–1	(Scotland) Rangers
Claessen 7'; Crossan 40', 51'; Vliers 56'	Report	Wilson 18'

Stade de Sclessin, Liège
Attendance: 35,891
Referee: Vicente Caballero (Spain)

14 February 1962
15:00 CET

Juventus (Italy)	0–1	(Spain) Real Madrid
	Report	Di Stéfano 79'

Stadio Comunale, Turin
Attendance: 66,403
Referee: Albert Dusch (West Germany)

14 February 1962

Dukla Prague (Czechoslovakia)	1–0	(England) Tottenham Hotspur
Kučera 59'	Report

Stadion Dr. Václava Vacka, Prague
Attendance: 32,475
Referee: Josef Stoll (Austria)

=== Second leg ===
14 February 1962

Rangers (Scotland)	2–0	(Belgium) Standard Liège
Brand 28'; Caldow 89' (pen.)	Report

Ibrox Park, Glasgow
Attendance: 76,730
Referee: Leo Horn (Netherlands)

Standard Liège won 4–3 on aggregate.

21 February 1962
20:30 CET

Real Madrid (Spain)	0–1	(Italy) Juventus
	Report	Sívori 38'

Santiago Bernabéu, Madrid
Attendance: 72,512
Referee: Maurice Guigue (France)

Juventus 1–1 Real Madrid on aggregate; play-off needed.

22 February 1962

Benfica (Portugal)	6–0	(West Germany) 1. FC Nürnberg
Águas 3'; Eusébio 4', 55'; Coluna 21'; Augusto 63', 78'	Report

Estádio da Luz, Lisbon
Attendance: 55,000
Referee: Gino Rigato (Italy)

Benfica won 7–3 on aggregate.

26 February 1962

Tottenham Hotspur (England)	4–1	(Czechoslovakia) Dukla Prague
Smith 11', 53'; Mackay 15', 54'	Report	Jelínek 46'

White Hart Lane, London
Attendance: 55,389
Referee: Carl Jørgensen (Denmark)

Tottenham Hotspur won 4–2 on aggregate.

=== Play-off ===
28 February 1962
20:30 CET

Real Madrid (Spain)	3–1	(Italy) Juventus
Felo 1'; Del Sol 65'; Tejada 82'	Report	Sívori 33'

Parc des Princes, Paris
Attendance: 36,750
Referee: Pierre Schwinte (France)

Real Madrid won 3–1 in play-off.

== Semi-finals ==
Team 1	Agg.	Team 2	1st leg	2nd leg
Benfica (Portugal)	4–3	(England) Tottenham Hotspur	3–1	1–2
Real Madrid (Spain)	6–0	(Belgium) Standard Liège	4–0	2–0

=== First leg ===
21 March 1962

Benfica (Portugal)	3–1	(England) Tottenham Hotspur
Simões 5'; Augusto 19', 64'	Report	Smith 54'

Estádio da Luz, Lisbon
Attendance: 60,000
Referee: Daniel Mellet (Switzerland)

22 March 1962
20:30 CET

Real Madrid (Spain)	4–0	(Belgium) Standard Liège
Di Stéfano 24'; Tejada 38', 79'; Casado 47'	Report

Santiago Bernabéu, Madrid
Attendance: 110,000
Referee: Joseph Barbéran (France)

=== Second leg ===
5 April 1962

Tottenham Hotspur (England)	2–1	(Portugal) Benfica
Smith 34'; Blanchflower 48' (pen.)	Report	Águas 16'

White Hart Lane, London
Attendance: 64,448
Referee: Aage Poulsen (Denmark)

Benfica won 4–3 on aggregate.

12 April 1962
19:30 CET

Standard Liège (Belgium)	0–2	(Spain) Real Madrid
	Report	Puskás 50'; Del Sol 59'

Stade de Sclessin, Liège
Attendance: 35,000
Referee: Gerhard Schulenburg (West Germany)

Real Madrid won 6–0 on aggregate.

== Final ==
2 May 1962
19:30 CET

Benfica (Portugal)	5–3	(Spain) Real Madrid
Águas 25'; Cavém 33'; Coluna 50'; Eusébio 64' (pen.), 69'	Report UEFA	Puskás 18', 23', 39'

Olympisch Stadion, Amsterdam
Attendance: 61,257
Referee: Leo Horn (Netherlands)

== Top goalscorers ==
The top scorers from the 1961–62 European Cup (including preliminary round) were as follows:

Rank	Player	Team	Goals
1	(West Germany) Heinz Strehl	(West Germany) 1. FC Nürnberg	8
2	(Hungary) Ferenc Puskás	(Spain) Real Madrid	7
2	(Spain) Alfredo Di Stéfano	(Spain) Real Madrid	7
2	(Spain) Justo Tejada	(Spain) Real Madrid	7
5	(Portugal) José Águas	(Portugal) Benfica	6
5	(Belgium) Roger Claessen	(Belgium) Standard Liège	6
5	(Denmark) Bent Løfqvist	(Denmark) Boldklubben 1913	6
5	(England) Bobby Smith	(England) Tottenham Hotspur	6
9	(Portugal) Eusébio	(Portugal) Benfica	5
9	(Czechoslovakia) Rudolf Kučera	(Czechoslovakia) Dukla Prague	5
