= 1962–63 European Cup =

European football tournament

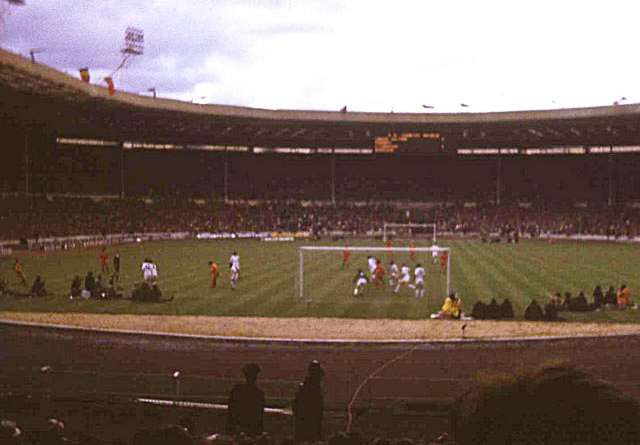
- Wembley Stadium in London hosted the final.

Tournament details
- Dates: 12 September 1962 – 22 May 1963
- Teams: 30 (from 29 associations)

Final positions
- Champions: (Italy) Milan (1st title)
- Runners-up: (Portugal) Benfica

Tournament statistics
- Matches played: 59
- Goals scored: 214 (3.63 per match)
- Attendance: 1,782,573 (30,213 per match)
- Top scorer(s): José Altafini (Milan); 14 goals

The 1962–63 European Cup was the eighth season of the European Cup, UEFA's premier club football tournament. The competition was won by Milan, who beat two-time defending champions Benfica in the final at Wembley Stadium, London, on 22 May 1963. Milan's victory was the first by an Italian club.

Five-time winners Real Madrid were eliminated in the preliminary round by Anderlecht, the first time previous winners didn't make it to the first round of the competition.

Albania entered its champion for the first time this season.

== Teams ==
A total of 30 teams participated in the competition.

Portugal continued to be represented by two clubs, with Benfica qualifying as title holders and Sporting CP as Portuguese champions. CSKA Red Flag appeared in the seventh edition of European Cup, with only Real Madrid having more appearances in the competition.

Partizani, Esbjerg, Ipswich Town, Union Luxembourg, Floriana, Shelbourne, Dundee and 1. FC Köln made their debut in the competition.

Galatasaray returned to the tournament for the first time since 1957, while IFK Norrköping, Polonia Bytom, Anderlecht and eventual winners Milan returned to the competition after five, four, three and three years, respectively.

All participants were their respective associations champions, except for Benfica and Fredrikstad. The latter was leading Hovedserien at the summer break on 1 July 1962, after 21 of 30 matches had been played, but finished third in autumn of 1962.

(Albania) Partizani (1st)	Austria Wien (1st)	(Belgium) Anderlecht (1st)	(Bulgaria) CSKA Red Flag (1st)
(Czechoslovakia) Dukla Prague (1st)	(Denmark) Esbjerg (1st)	(East Germany) Vorwärts Berlin (1st)	(England) Ipswich Town (1st)
(Finland) IFK Helsingfors (1st)	(France) Reims (1st)	(Greece) Panathinaikos (1st)	(Hungary) Vasas (1st)
(Italy) Milan (1st)	Union Luxembourg (1st)	(Malta) Floriana (1st)	(Netherlands) Feyenoord (1st)
(Northern Ireland) Linfield (1st)	(Norway) Fredrikstad (3rd)	(Poland) Polonia Bytom (1st)	(Portugal) Sporting CP (1st)
(Portugal) Benfica (3rd)^{TH}	(Republic of Ireland) Shelbourne (1st)	(Romania) Dinamo București (1st)	(Scotland) Dundee (1st)
(Spain) Real Madrid (1st)	(Sweden) IFK Norrköping (1st)	(Switzerland) Servette (1st)	(Turkey) Galatasaray (1st)
(West Germany) 1. FC Köln (1st)	(Socialist Federal Republic of Yugoslavia) Partizan (1st)		

== Preliminary round ==
Location of teams in the 1962–63 European Cup

Due to the number of participating teams only Reims (apart from title holders Benfica) received a bye to the first round. The remaining clubs would play the preliminary round in September.

	Pot 1 Western Europe	Pot 2 Eastern Europe
Drawn	Northern Ireland; England; West Germany; Netherlands; Republic of Ireland; Belgium; Luxembourg; Scotland; Italy; Malta; Spain; Portugal; Switzerland; Denmark	Romania; Bulgaria; Greece; Czechoslovakia; Hungary; Yugoslavia; Finland; Turkey; Poland; Norway; East Germany; Austria; Sweden; Albania
Byes	(France) Reims	—N/a

Team 1	Agg.	Team 2	1st leg	2nd leg	Play-off
Milan (Italy)	14–0	Union Luxembourg	8–0	6–0	
Floriana (Malta)	1–14	(England) Ipswich Town	1–4	0–10	
Dinamo București (Romania)	1–4	(Turkey) Galatasaray	1–1	0–3	
Polonia Bytom (Poland)	6–2	(Greece) Panathinaikos	2–1	4–1	
CSKA Red Flag (Bulgaria)	6–2	(Socialist Federal Republic of Yugoslavia) Partizan	2–1	4–1	
Real Madrid (Spain)	3–4	(Belgium) Anderlecht	3–3	0–1	
Shelbourne (Republic of Ireland)	1–7	(Portugal) Sporting CP	0–2	1–5	
Dundee (Scotland)	8–5	(West Germany) 1. FC Köln	8–1	0–4	
Servette (Switzerland)	4–4	(Netherlands) Feyenoord	1–3	3–1	1–3 (a.e.t.)
Fredrikstad (Norway)	1–11	(Hungary) Vasas	1–4	0–7	
Austria Wien	7–3	(Finland) IFK Helsingfors	5–3	2–0	
Vorwärts Berlin (East Germany)	0–4	(Czechoslovakia) Dukla Prague	0–3	0–1	
Linfield (Northern Ireland)	1–2	(Denmark) Esbjerg	1–2	0–0	
IFK Norrköping (Sweden)	3–1	(Albania) Partizani	2–0	1–1	

=== First leg ===
5 September 1962
21:30 CET

Real Madrid (Spain)	3–3	(Belgium) Anderlecht
Zoco 14'; Gento 30'; Di Stéfano 48'	Report	Van Himst 37'; Janssens 42'; Stockman 80'

Santiago Bernabéu, Madrid
Attendance: 90,000
Referee: Pierre Schwinte (France)

26 August 1962

IFK Norrköping (Sweden)	2–0	(Albania) Partizani
Bild 55'; Rosander 74'	Report

Idrottsparken, Norrköping
Attendance: 12,271
Referee: Leif Gulliksen (Norway)

5 September 1962

Linfield (Northern Ireland)	1–2	(Denmark) Esbjerg
Dickson 7'	Report	Christiansen 25'; Bertelsen 42'

Windsor Park, Belfast
Attendance: 15,674
Referee: James Barclay (Scotland)

5 September 1962

Dundee (Scotland)	8–1	(West Germany) 1. FC Köln
Hemmersbach 10' (o.g.); Wishart 11'; Robertson 12'; Gilzean 26', 63', 66'; Smith 45'; Penman 49'	Report	Benthaus 72'

Dens Park, Dundee
Attendance: 23,821
Referee: Carl Jørgensen (Denmark)

5 September 1962

Fredrikstad (Norway)	1–4	(Hungary) Vasas
Aas 78'	Report	L. Pál 56', 72', 79'; Kékesi 86'

Fredrikstad Stadion, Fredrikstad
Attendance: 6,024
Referee: Bengt Lundell (Sweden)

5 September 1962

Austria Wien	5–3	(Finland) IFK Helsingfors
Hirnschrodt 16'; Nemec 40', 86', 88'; Schleger 55'	Report	Ekman 6'; Wiik 30'; Kankkonen 83' (pen.)

Praterstadion, Vienna
Attendance: 31,395
Referee: Konstantin Zečević (Yugoslavia)

9 September 1962
17:00 CET

Dinamo București (Romania)	1–1	(Turkey) Galatasaray
Pârcălab 71' (pen.)	Report	Oktay 53'

Stadionul August 23, Bucharest
Attendance: 30,550
Referee: Georgi Hristov (Bulgaria)

12 September 1962
21:30 CET

Servette (Switzerland)	1–3	(Netherlands) Feyenoord
Mekhloufi 33'	Report	Kruiver 44', 50'; Bennaars 70'

Stade des Charmilles, Genève
Attendance: 18,133
Referee: Gérard Versyp (Belgium)

12 September 1962
22:30 CET

Milan (Italy)	8–0	Union Luxembourg
Altafini 8', 11', 28', 44', 67'; Rivera 34'; Germano 43', 73'	Report

San Siro, Milan
Attendance: 25,824
Referee: Joseph Heymann (Switzerland)

12 September 1962

Polonia Bytom (Poland)	2–1	(Greece) Panathinaikos
Pogrzeba 28'; Jóźwiak 70'	Report	Theofanis 29'

Stadion Śląski, Chorzów
Attendance: 20,000
Referee: Jozef Rajcani (Czechoslovakia)

18 September 1962

Floriana (Malta)	1–4	(England) Ipswich Town
D'Emanuelle 87'	Report	Crawford 7', 57'; Phillips 30', 81'

Empire Stadium, Gżira
Attendance: 15,784
Referee: Bruno de Marchi (Italy)

19 September 1962

CSKA Red Flag (Bulgaria)	2–1	(Socialist Federal Republic of Yugoslavia) Partizan
Rankov 14'; Kolev 20'	Report	Kovačević 34' (pen.)

Vasil Levski National Stadium, Sofia
Attendance: 21,421
Referee: Alfred Haberfellner (Austria)

19 September 1962

Shelbourne (Republic of Ireland)	0–2	(Portugal) Sporting CP
	Report	Morais 35'; Géo 80'

Dalymount Park, Dublin
Attendance: 20,381
Referee: Pieter Roomer (Netherlands)

26 September 1962
17:00 CET

Vorwärts Berlin (East Germany)	0–3	(Czechoslovakia) Dukla Prague
	Report	Adamec 45', 59', 70'

Friedrich-Ludwig-Jahn-Sportpark, Berlin
Attendance: 19,801
Referee: Marian Koczner (Poland)

=== Second leg ===
12 September 1962

Partizani (Albania)	1–1	(Sweden) IFK Norrköping
Kraja 48'	Report	Kindvall 6'

Stadiumi Qemal Stafa, Tirana
Attendance: 18,000
Referee: Václav Korelus (Czechoslovakia)

IFK Norrköping won 3–1 on aggregate.

16 September 1962

Galatasaray (Turkey)	3–0	(Romania) Dinamo București
Oktay 13' (pen.); Köken 51'; Kutver 78'	Report

Mithatpaşa Stadyumu, Istanbul
Attendance: 17,466
Referee: Atanas Kiryakov (Bulgaria)

Galatasaray won 4–1 on aggregate.

19 September 1962

Esbjerg (Denmark)	0–0	(Northern Ireland) Linfield
	Report

Esbjerg Stadion, Esbjerg
Attendance: 13,248
Referee: Alistair MacKenzie (Scotland)

Esbjerg won 2–1 on aggregate.

19 September 1962

Panathinaikos (Greece)	1–4	(Poland) Polonia Bytom
Panakis 38'	Report	Liberda 25'; Kempny 44', 47'; Pogrzeba 70'

Leoforos Alexandras Stadium, Athens
Attendance: 23,245
Referee: Joseph Cassar-Naudi (Malta)

Polonia Bytom won 6–2 on aggregate.

19 September 1962

Union Luxembourg	0–6	(Italy) Milan
	Report	Rossano 7', 39'; Altafini 34', 42', 90'; Pivatelli 58'

Stade Municipal, Luxembourg
Attendance: 4,299
Referee: Anton Bucheli (Switzerland)

Milan won 14–0 on aggregate.

19 September 1962

Feyenoord (Netherlands)	1–3	(Switzerland) Servette
Bennaars 76' (pen.)	Report	Mekhloufi 16'; Heuri 26'; Desbiolles 52'

De Kuip, Rotterdam
Attendance: 30,064
Referee: Marcel Raeymaekers (Belgium)

Servette 4–4 Feyenoord on aggregate; play-off needed.

19 September 1962

Vasas (Hungary)	7–0	(Norway) Fredrikstad
L. Pál 11', 13'; Farkas 20', 22', 57'; T. Pál 44', 56'	Report

Népstadion, Budapest
Attendance: 6,648
Referee: Aleksandar Skorić (Yugoslavia)

Vasas won 11–1 on aggregate.

25 September 1962

Ipswich Town (England)	10–0	(Malta) Floriana
Moran 8', 52'; Phillips 14', 34' (pen.); Crawford 28', 39', 44', 60', 80'; Elsworthy 54'	Report

Portman Road, Ipswich
Attendance: 25,287
Referee: Andries van Leeuwen (Netherlands)

Ipswich Town won 14–1 on aggregate.

26 September 1962
20:30 CET

Anderlecht (Belgium)	1–0	(Spain) Real Madrid
Jurion 85'	Report

Heysel Stadium, Brussels
Attendance: 64,694
Referee: Marcel Bois (France)

Anderlecht won 4–3 on aggregate.

26 September 1962

IFK Helsingfors (Finland)	0–2	Austria Wien
	Report	Nemec 62'; Jacaré 80'

Helsinki Olympic Stadium, Helsinki
Attendance: 2,634
Referee: Kurt Lindberg (Sweden)

Austria Wien won 7–3 on aggregate.

26 September 1962

Sporting CP (Portugal)	5–1	(Republic of Ireland) Shelbourne
Lúcio 5' (pen.); Mascarenhas 8', 70'; José Carlos 48'; Morais 61'	Report	Hennessy 88'

Estádio José Alvalade, Lisbon
Attendance: 30,000
Referee: Vicente Caballero (Spain)

Sporting CP won 7–1 on aggregate.

26 September 1962

1. FC Köln (West Germany)	4–0	(Scotland) Dundee
Habig 8'; Müller 37', 57'; Schäfer 44'	Report

Müngersdorfer Stadion, Cologne
Attendance: 37,998
Referee: Aage Poulsen (Denmark)

Dundee won 8–5 on aggregate.

3 October 1962

Partizan (Socialist Federal Republic of Yugoslavia)	1–4	(Bulgaria) CSKA Red Flag
Galić 70'	Report	Tsanev 22'; Yakimov 47'; Kovachev 81' (pen.); Panayotov 90'

Stadion JNA, Belgrade
Attendance: 26,890
Referee: Fritz Seipelt (Austria)

CSKA Red Flag won 6–2 on aggregate.

3 October 1962

Dukla Prague (Czechoslovakia)	1–0	(East Germany) Vorwärts Berlin
Adamec 30'	Report

Stadion Juliska, Prague
Attendance: 6,820
Referee: Włodzimierz Storoniak (Poland)

Dukla Prague won 4–0 on aggregate.

=== Play-off ===
17 October 1962
20:00 CET

Feyenoord (Netherlands)	3–1 (a.e.t.)	(Switzerland) Servette
Kruiver 52'; Bouwmeester 91'; Van der Gijp 98' (pen.)	Report	Németh 33'

Rheinstadion, Düsseldorf
Attendance: 9,737
Referee: Johannes Malka (West Germany)

Feyenoord won play-off 3–1.

== Bracket ==
First round
Austria Wien	3	0	3
(France) Reims	2	5	7
(Netherlands) Feyenoord	1	2	3 (1)
(Hungary) Vasas	1	2	3 (0)
(Denmark) Esbjerg	0	0	0
(Czechoslovakia) Dukla Prague	0	5	5
(Sweden) IFK Norrköping	1	1	2
(Portugal) Benfica	1	5	6
(Turkey) Galatasaray	4	0	4
(Poland) Polonia Bytom	1	1	2
(Italy) Milan	3	1	4
(England) Ipswich Town	0	2	2
(Bulgaria) CSKA Red Flag	2	0	2
(Belgium) Anderlecht	2	2	4
(Portugal) Sporting CP	1	1	2
(Scotland) Dundee	0	4	4

Quarter-finals
(France) Reims	0	1	1
(Netherlands) Feyenoord	1	1	2
(Czechoslovakia) Dukla Prague	1	0	1
(Portugal) Benfica	2	0	2
(Turkey) Galatasaray	1	0	1
(Italy) Milan	3	5	8
(Belgium) Anderlecht	1	1	2
(Scotland) Dundee	4	2	6

Semi-finals
(Netherlands) Feyenoord	0	1	1
(Portugal) Benfica	0	3	3
(Italy) Milan	5	0	5
(Scotland) Dundee	1	1	2

Final
(Portugal) Benfica	1
(Italy) Milan	2

== First round ==
Team 1	Agg.	Team 2	1st leg	2nd leg	Play-off
Milan (Italy)	4–2	(England) Ipswich Town	3–0	1–2	
Galatasaray (Turkey)	4–2	(Poland) Polonia Bytom	4–1	0–1	
CSKA Red Flag (Bulgaria)	2–4	(Belgium) Anderlecht	2–2	0–2	
Sporting CP (Portugal)	2–4	(Scotland) Dundee	1–0	1–4	
Feyenoord (Netherlands)	3–3	(Hungary) Vasas	1–1	2–2	1–0
Austria Wien	3–7	(France) Reims	3–2	0–5	
Esbjerg (Denmark)	0–5	(Czechoslovakia) Dukla Prague	0–0	0–5	
IFK Norrköping (Sweden)	2–6	(Portugal) Benfica	1–1	1–5	

=== First leg ===
18 October 1962

Austria Wien	3–2	(France) Reims
Jacaré 13'; Hirnschrodt 26'; Fiala 59'	Report	Sauvage 14' (pen.), 78'

Praterstadion, Vienna
Attendance: 41,783
Referee: Gyula Gere (Hungary)

24 October 1962

CSKA Red Flag (Bulgaria)	2–2	(Belgium) Anderlecht
Kolev 57'; Yakimov 85'	Report	Jurion 62', 74'

Vasil Levski National Stadium, Sofia
Attendance: 22,230
Referee: Concetto Lo Bello (Italy)

24 October 1962

Sporting CP (Portugal)	1–0	(Scotland) Dundee
Géo 90'	Report

Estádio José Alvalade, Lisbon
Attendance: 45,000
Referee: Henri Faucheux (France)

31 October 1962

IFK Norrköping (Sweden)	1–1	(Portugal) Benfica
Björklund 8'	Report	Eusébio 31'

Idrottsparken, Norrköping
Attendance: 24,205
Referee: Gerhard Schulenburg (West Germany)

7 November 1962

Esbjerg (Denmark)	0–0	(Czechoslovakia) Dukla Prague
	Report

Vejle Stadion, Vejle
Attendance: 14,620
Referee: Pieter Roomer (Netherlands)

7 November 1962

Galatasaray (Turkey)	4–1	(Poland) Polonia Bytom
Oktay 19' (pen.), 29', 57'; Mamat 50'	Report	Pogrzeba 43'

Mithatpaşa Stadyumu, Istanbul
Attendance: 23,274
Referee: Vasile Dumitrescu (Romania)

14 November 1962
20:30 CET

Feyenoord (Netherlands)	1–1	(Hungary) Vasas
Van der Gijp 23'	Report	L. Pál 38'

De Kuip, Rotterdam
Attendance: 53,700
Referee: Ken Dagnall (England)

14 November 1962

Milan (Italy)	3–0	(England) Ipswich Town
Barison 8', 13'; Sani 64'	Report

San Siro, Milan
Attendance: 7,607
Referee: Gottfried Dienst (Switzerland)

=== Second leg ===
31 October 1962

Dundee (Scotland)	4–1	(Portugal) Sporting CP
Gilzean 13', 53'; Cousin 44', 60'	Report	Figueiredo 66'

Dens Park, Dundee
Attendance: 30,596
Referee: Erling Rolf Olsen (Norway)

Dundee won 4–2 on aggregate.

14 November 1962

Anderlecht (Belgium)	2–0	(Bulgaria) CSKA Red Flag
Lippens 40' (pen.), 50' (pen.)	Report

Heysel Stadium, Brussels
Attendance: 56,702
Referee: Tage Sørensen (Denmark)

Anderlecht won 4–2 on aggregate.

14 November 1962

Reims (France)	5–0	Austria Wien
Kopa 11', 69'; Siatka 18'; Dubaële 36'; Akesbi 79'	Report

Parc des Princes, Paris
Attendance: 36,794
Referee: Félix Birigay Nieva (Spain)

Reims won 7–3 on aggregate.

14 November 1962

Dukla Prague (Czechoslovakia)	5–0	(Denmark) Esbjerg
Brumovský 17', 82'; Frandsen 54' (o.g.); Masopust 57'; Vacenovský 68'	Report

Stadion Juliska, Prague
Attendance: 8,622
Referee: Josef Stoll (Austria)

Dukla Prague won 5–0 on aggregate.

18 November 1962

Polonia Bytom (Poland)	1–0	(Turkey) Galatasaray
Jóźwiak 20'	Report

Stadion Śląski, Chorzów
Attendance: 8,462
Referee: Helmut Köhler (West Germany)

Galatasaray won 4–2 on aggregate.

22 November 1962

Benfica (Portugal)	5–1	(Sweden) IFK Norrköping
Águas 1'; Eusébio 18', 35', 85'; Coluna 21'	Report	Björklund 62'

Estádio da Luz, Lisbon
Attendance: 50,000
Referee: Jean Tricot (France)

Benfica won 6–2 on aggregate.

28 November 1962
17:30 CET

Vasas (Hungary)	2–2	(Netherlands) Feyenoord
Machos 36' (pen.), 87' (pen.)	Report	Kruiver 44'; Kerkum 60' (pen.)

Népstadion, Budapest
Attendance: 5,041
Referee: Giulio Campanati (Italy)

Feyenoord 3–3 Vasas on aggregate; play-off needed.

28 November 1962

Ipswich Town (England)	2–1	(Italy) Milan
Crawford 79'; Blackwood 86'	Report	Barison 62'

Portman Road, Ipswich
Attendance: 25,001
Referee: Arthur Blavier (Belgium)

Milan won 4–2 on aggregate.

=== Play-off ===
12 December 1962

Feyenoord (Netherlands)	1–0	(Hungary) Vasas
Bennaars 55'	Report

Bosuilstadion, Antwerp
Attendance: 44,617
Referee: Lucien Van Nuffel (Belgium)

Feyenoord won play-off 1–0.

== Quarter-finals ==
Team 1	Agg.	Team 2	1st leg	2nd leg
Galatasaray (Turkey)	1–8	(Italy) Milan	1–3	0–5
Anderlecht (Belgium)	2–6	(Scotland) Dundee	1–4	1–2
Reims (France)	1–2	(Netherlands) Feyenoord	0–1	1–1
Benfica (Portugal)	2–1	(Czechoslovakia) Dukla Prague	2–1	0–0

=== First leg ===
23 January 1963

Galatasaray (Turkey)	1–3	(Italy) Milan
Köken 4'	Report	Mora 34' (pen.); Barison 38'; Altafini 76'

Mithatpaşa Stadyumu, Istanbul
Attendance: 20,952
Referee: Fritz Seipelt (Austria)

6 February 1963
20:30 CET

Reims (France)	0–1	(Netherlands) Feyenoord
	Report	Kreijermaat 27'

Parc des Princes, Paris
Attendance: 30,733
Referee: Kurt Tschenscher (West Germany)

6 March 1963

Anderlecht (Belgium)	1–4	(Scotland) Dundee
Lippens 36' (pen.)	Report	Gilzean 1', 18'; Cousin 47'; Penman 71'

Heysel Stadium, Brussels
Attendance: 64,703
Referee: Daniel Mellet (Switzerland)

6 March 1963

Benfica (Portugal)	2–1	(Czechoslovakia) Dukla Prague
Coluna 54', 85'	Report	Vacenovský 63'

Estádio da Luz, Lisbon
Attendance: 60,603
Referee: Ken Aston (England)

=== Second leg ===
13 March 1963
15:00 CET

Dukla Prague (Czechoslovakia)	0–0	(Portugal) Benfica
	Report

Velký strahovský stadion, Prague
Attendance: 43,989
Referee: Arthur Holland (England)

Benfica won 2–1 on aggregate.

13 March 1963
20:30 CET

Feyenoord (Netherlands)	1–1	(France) Reims
Kruiver 40'	Report	Akesbi 85'

De Kuip, Rotterdam
Attendance: 52,565
Referee: Gerhard Schulenburg (West Germany)

Feyenoord won 2–1 on aggregate.

13 March 1963
21:15 CET

Milan (Italy)	5–0	(Turkey) Galatasaray
Pivatelli 11', 42'; Altafini 50', 66', 70'	Report

San Siro, Milan
Attendance: 22,882
Referee: Josef Stoll (Austria)

Milan won 8–1 on aggregate.

13 March 1963

Dundee (Scotland)	2–1	(Belgium) Anderlecht
Cousin 79'; Smith 83'	Report	Stockman 28'

Dens Park, Dundee
Attendance: 38,232
Referee: Gottfried Dienst (Switzerland)

Dundee won 6–2 on aggregate.

== Semi-finals ==
Team 1	Agg.	Team 2	1st leg	2nd leg
Milan (Italy)	5–2	(Scotland) Dundee	5–1	0–1
Feyenoord (Netherlands)	1–3	(Portugal) Benfica	0–0	1–3

=== First leg ===
10 April 1963
20:30 CET

Feyenoord (Netherlands)	0–0	(Portugal) Benfica
	Report

De Kuip, Rotterdam
Attendance: 51,826
Referee: Josef Kandlbinder (Austria)

24 April 1963

Milan (Italy)	5–1	(Scotland) Dundee
Sani 3'; Barison 47', 76'; Mora 52', 82'	Report	Cousin 22'

San Siro, Milan
Attendance: 73,933
Referee: Vicente Caballero (Spain)

=== Second leg ===
1 May 1963
20:30 CET

Dundee (Scotland)	1–0	(Italy) Milan
Gilzean 43'	Report

Dens Park, Dundee
Attendance: 35,169
Referee: Lucien Van Nuffel (Belgium)

Milan won 5–2 on aggregate.

8 May 1963

Benfica (Portugal)	3–1	(Netherlands) Feyenoord
Eusébio 20'; Augusto 43'; Santana 62'	Report	Bouwmeester 80'

Estádio da Luz, Lisbon
Attendance: 74,908
Referee: Joseph Barbéran (France)

Benfica won 3–1 on aggregate.

== Final ==
22 May 1963
16:00 CET

Benfica (Portugal)	1–2	(Italy) Milan
Eusébio 19'	Report	Altafini 58', 69'

Wembley Stadium, London
Attendance: 45,715
Referee: Arthur Holland (England)

== Top goalscorers ==
The top scorers from the 1962–63 European Cup (including preliminary round) were as follows:

Rank	Player	Team	Goals
1	(Italy) José Altafini	(Italy) Milan	14
2	(England) Ray Crawford	(England) Ipswich Town	8
2	(Scotland) Alan Gilzean	(Scotland) Dundee	8
4	(Italy) Paolo Barison	(Italy) Milan	6
4	(Portugal) Eusébio	(Portugal) Benfica	6
4	(Hungary) László Pál	(Hungary) Vasas	6
7	(Scotland) Alan Cousin	(Scotland) Dundee	5
7	(Netherlands) Piet Kruiver	(Netherlands) Feyenoord	5
7	(Turkey) Metin Oktay	(Turkey) Galatasaray	5
10	(Czechoslovakia) Jozef Adamec	(Czechoslovakia) Dukla Prague	4
10	(Austria) Horst Nemec	Austria Wien	4
10	(England) Ted Phillips	(England) Ipswich Town	4
