= 1961 Bulgarian Cup final =

- Event: 1960–61 Bulgarian Cup
CSKA Sofia	Spartak Varna
3	0
- Date: 28 June 1961
- Venue: Vasil Levski National Stadium, Sofia
- Referee: Petar Dzhonev (Plovdiv)
- Attendance: 25,000

The 1961 Bulgarian Cup final was the 21st final of the Bulgarian Cup (in this period the tournament was named Cup of the Soviet Army), and was contested between CSKA Sofia and Spartak Varna on 28 June 1961 at Vasil Levski National Stadium in Sofia. CSKA won the final 3–0.

== Match ==
=== Details ===
28 June 1961

CSKA Sofia	3−0	Spartak Varna
Rankov 59'; Tsanev 69'; Kolev 71'

Vasil Levski National Stadium, Sofia
Attendance: 25,000
Referee: Petar Dzhonev (Plovdiv)

CSKA	Spartak

GK	1	(Bulgaria) Georgi Naydenov
DF	2	(Bulgaria) Kiril Rakarov
DF	3	(Bulgaria) Manol Manolov
DF	4	(Bulgaria) Stoyan Koshev
DF	5	(Bulgaria) Nikola Kovachev
MF	6	(Bulgaria) Panteley Dimitrov
MF	7	(Bulgaria) Ivan Rankov
FW	8	(Bulgaria) Nikola Tsanev
FW	9	(Bulgaria) Panayot Panayotov
MF	10	(Bulgaria) Dimitar Yakimov
FW	11	(Bulgaria) Ivan Kolev
Substitutes:
Manager:
(Bulgaria) Krum Milev

GK	1	(Bulgaria) Hristo Valchanov	(substituted off) 46'
DF	2	(Bulgaria) Biser Dimitrov
DF	3	(Bulgaria) Iliya Kirchev (c)
DF	4	(Bulgaria) Spiridon Filipov
MF	5	(Bulgaria) Blagoy Yanev
MF	6	(Bulgaria) Nikola Zhivkov
FW	7	(Bulgaria) Lyuben Kostov
FW	8	(Bulgaria) Hristo Nikolov
FW	9	(Bulgaria) Petko Petkov
MF	10	(Bulgaria) Ivan Filipov
MF	11	(Bulgaria) Stefan Stefanov
Substitutes:
GK	12	(Bulgaria) Hristofor Panchev	(substituted in) 46'
Manager:
(Bulgaria) Toma Zahariev

== See also ==
- 1960–61 A Group
