= 1960–61 A Group =

17th season of top-tier football league in Bulgaria

A Group
- Season: 1960–61
- Champions: CSKA Sofia (11th title)
- Relegated: Spartak Sofia; Septemvri
- European Cup: CSKA Sofia
- Matches: 182
- Goals: 527 (2.9 per match)
- Top goalscorer: Ivan Sotirov (20 goals)

The 1960–61 A Group was the 13th season of the A Football Group, the top Bulgarian professional league for association football clubs, since its establishment in 1948.

== Overview ==
It was contested by 14 teams, and CSKA Sofia won the championship for the eighth consecutive time.

== League standings ==
Pos	Team	Pld	W	D	L	GF	GA	GD	Pts	Qualification or relegation
1	CSKA Sofia (C)	26	18	4	4	56	17	+39	40	Qualification for European Cup preliminary round
2	Levski Sofia	26	10	10	6	45	33	+12	30	
3	Botev Plovdiv	26	10	9	7	50	41	+9	29	
4	Minyor Pernik	26	9	10	7	36	39	−3	28	
5	Marek Dupnitsa	26	9	9	8	33	45	−12	27	
6	Lokomotiv Sofia	26	9	8	9	33	29	+4	26	
7	Spartak Varna	26	11	4	11	29	37	−8	26	Qualification for Cup Winners' Cup preliminary round (Note: Spartak Varna qualified for European Cup Winners' Cup as a finalists in the 1960–61 Bulgarian Cup.)
8	Dunav Ruse	26	10	5	11	38	46	−8	25	
9	Spartak Plovdiv	26	7	10	9	39	37	+2	24	
10	Beroe Stara Zagora	26	7	10	9	30	38	−8	24	
11	Slavia Sofia	26	8	7	11	33	37	−4	23	
12	Cherno More Varna	26	8	7	11	33	37	−4	23	
13	Spartak Sofia (R)	26	8	6	12	39	35	+4	22	Relegation to 1961–62 B Group
14	Septemvri Sofia (R)	26	5	7	14	33	56	−23	17	Relegation to 1961–62 B Group

Source: rsssf.com
(C) Champions; (R) Relegated

== Results ==
Home \ Away	BSZ	BPD	CHM	CSK	DUN	LEV	LSO	MAR	MIN	SEP	SLA	SPD	SSF	SPV
Beroe Stara Zagora		2–1	1–1	0–0	0–0	2–0	2–2	2–0	3–0	4–2	2–1	0–0	1–1	1–1
Botev Plovdiv	3–0		4–2	2–1	3–1	1–1	3–2	4–1	0–0	4–1	3–1	3–3	0–0	2–2
Cherno More	1–1	0–0		1–2	2–0	1–1	1–0	4–1	0–1	5–1	2–1	4–0	2–1	1–2
CSKA Sofia	3–0	2–0	5–0		4–1	2–0	2–1	2–0	7–1	3–0	1–1	2–0	2–1	3–0
Dunav Ruse	3–2	3–1	1–1	1–3		2–2	1–1	4–1	1–3	3–2	0–1	2–0	2–1	2–1
Levski Sofia	5–0	1–1	4–0	1–0	3–3		1–1	7–1	0–3	3–1	3–2	2–1	2–1	1–0
Lokomotiv Sofia	1–1	1–2	1–0	2–1	1–0	0–0		1–1	1–1	6–2	0–1	1–0	2–1	2–1
Marek Dupnitsa	1–0	4–1	2–2	2–1	3–2	1–0	2–1		0–0	1–1	1–1	1–1	1–0	3–1
Minyor Pernik	1–1	1–5	1–0	2–2	0–1	0–2	1–0	4–2		1–1	2–2	1–1	3–3	4–1
Septemvri Sofia	2–3	1–1	1–2	0–4	2–0	0–0	3–2	1–1	1–2		1–1	1–1	2–0	2–0
Slavia Sofia	1–0	4–2	3–1	0–0	1–2	1–0	1–3	0–0	1–2	1–0		2–0	1–1	1–2
Spartak Plovdiv	4–0	2–2	1–0	0–1	2–3	1–1	0–0	4–1	2–2	4–2	3–1		2–0	4–0
Spartak Sofia	2–1	0–0	0–0	1–2	5–0	4–1	0–1	1–2	1–0	3–0	5–3	2–2		1–2
Spartak Varna	2–1	1–0	2–0	0–1	1–0	3–3	1–0	0–0	1–0	1–3	1–0	3–1	0–1	

Source: A PFG (in Bulgarian)
Legend: Blue = home team win; Yellow = draw; Red = away team win.

== Champions ==
CSKA Sofia

Goalkeepers
(Bulgaria) Georgi Naydenov	23	(0)
(Bulgaria) Hristo Andonov	6	(0)
(Bulgaria) Petar Petrov	4	(0)

Defenders
(Bulgaria) Nikola Kovachev	24	(2)
(Bulgaria) Stoyan Koshev	22	(1)
(Bulgaria) Kiril Rakarov	17	(1)
(Bulgaria) Manol Manolov	21	(0)
(Bulgaria) Boris Gaganelov	11	(0)

Midfielders
(Bulgaria) Petar Aleksiev	10	(0)
(Bulgaria) Georgi Zlatkov	7	(0)
(Bulgaria) Panteley Dimitrov	22	(0)
(Bulgaria) Vasil Romanov	12	(1)

Forwards
(Bulgaria) Ivan Kolev	26	(18)
(Bulgaria) Ivan Rankov	19	(4)
(Bulgaria) Nikola Tsanev	23	(9)
(Bulgaria) Dimitar Yakimov	23	(9)
(Bulgaria) Panayot Panayotov	26	(8)
(Bulgaria) Anton Krastev	7	(2)

Manager
(Bulgaria) Krum Milev

== Top scorers ==
Rank	Scorer	Club	Goals
1	(Bulgaria) Ivan Sotirov	Botev Plovdiv	20
2	(Bulgaria) Ivan Kolev	CSKA Sofia	18
3	(Bulgaria) Nikola Yordanov	Dunav Ruse	15
4	(Bulgaria) Dimitar Yordanov	Levski Sofia	14
4	(Bulgaria) Pavel Vladimirov	Minyor Pernik	14
6	(Bulgaria) Tsvetan Milev	Septemvri Sofia	11
6	(Bulgaria) Dobromir Tashkov	Slavia Sofia	11
