= Løfqvist =

Løfqvist, Löfkvist, Löfqvist or Lofquist is a surname of Swedish origin. Notable people with the surname include:

== Løfqvist ==
- Bent Løfqvist-Hansen (born 1936), Danish footballer
- Gyrd Løfqvist (1921–2012), Danish film actor

== Löfkvist ==
- Ellen Löfkvist (born 1997), Swedish footballer
- Henrik Löfkvist (born 1995), Swedish footballer
- Oskar Löfkvist (born 1980), Swedish actor
- Thomas Löfkvist (born 1984), Swedish former road bicycle racer

== Löfqvist ==
- Christer Löfqvist (1944-1978), international speedway rider
- Sven William Löfqvist (1947–2016), Swedish ice hockey goaltender

== Lofquist ==
- Sam Lofquist (born 1990), American professional ice hockey player
