= 1957–58 Tweede Divisie =

Tweede Divisie
- Season: 1957–58
- Champions: ZFC; SC Heracles
- Promoted: ZFC; SC Heracles
- Goals scored: 1,496
- Average goals/game: 3.81

The Dutch Tweede Divisie in the 1957–58 season was contested by 29 teams, one less than in the previous season due to the voluntary return of FC Oss to amateur football. The teams were divided in two groups of fifteen and fourteen teams respectively. Teams could not be relegated to amateur football. ZFC and SC Heracles won the championships.

== New entrants ==
Relegated from the Eerste Divisie:

- Emma (entered in group A)
- EBOH (entered in group A)

Group changes

- The groups changed this season, group A from last season would be group B for this season, and the other way around.
- N.E.C. changed groups and would play in group B this season.

=== Tweede Divisie A ===
Pos	Team	Pld	W	D	L	GF	GA	GD	Pts	Promotion or relegation
1	ZFC	26	17	5	4	59	23	+36	39	Promoted to Eerste Divisie
2	RKVV Wilhelmina	26	13	7	6	79	51	+28	33	
3	FC Hilversum	26	13	6	7	52	37	+15	32	
4	De Valk	26	11	9	6	55	39	+16	31	
5	UVS	26	13	5	8	52	37	+15	31	
6	HVV t' Gooi	26	11	8	7	62	40	+22	30	
7	SV Zeist	26	11	4	11	54	59	−5	26	
8	VV Baronie	26	8	8	10	44	61	−17	24	
9	LONGA	26	8	7	11	39	43	−4	23	
10	Emma	26	7	8	11	38	53	−15	22	Voluntarily returned to amateur football
11	EBOH	26	7	7	12	37	52	−15	21	
12	ONA	26	8	5	13	33	64	−31	21	
13	SV DOSKO	26	6	4	16	49	64	−15	16	
14	DHC Delft	26	4	7	15	29	59	−30	15	

Source: rsssf.com

=== Tweede Divisie B ===
Pos	Team	Pld	W	D	L	GF	GA	GD	Pts	Promotion
1	sc Heracles	28	23	1	4	85	33	+52	47	Promoted to Eerste Divisie
2	Enschedese Boys	28	20	3	5	73	27	+46	43	
3	Go Ahead	28	16	9	3	74	36	+38	41	
4	VV Rheden	28	13	3	12	54	46	+8	29	
5	NEC	28	11	6	11	48	50	−2	28	
6	Veendam	28	11	5	12	55	53	+2	27	
7	HVV Tubantia	28	9	8	11	46	50	−4	26	
8	VV Zwartemeer	28	9	8	11	55	72	−17	26	
9	VV Oldenzaal	28	10	5	13	50	49	+1	25	
10	sc Heerenveen	28	10	4	14	45	60	−15	24	
11	Velocitas 1897	28	8	7	13	48	56	−8	23	
12	PEC	28	10	3	15	47	67	−20	23	
13	Be Quick	28	7	8	13	49	70	−21	22	
14	Zwolsche Boys	28	7	5	16	43	75	−32	19	
15	Oosterparkers	28	7	3	18	42	70	−28	17	

Source: rsssf.com

== See also ==
- 1957–58 Eredivisie
- 1957–58 Eerste Divisie
