= Panteley Dimitrov =

Bulgarian footballer

Personal information
- Full name: Panteley Kostadinov Dimitrov
- Date of birth: 2 November 1940
- Place of birth: Bulgaria
- Date of death: 23 June 2001 (aged 60)
- Position: Midfielder

Senior career*
Years	Team	Apps	(Gls)
1958–1965	CSKA Sofia	128	(4)
1965–1968	Spartak Sofia	32	(0)
1968–1972	Spartak Varna	113	(7)
Total		273	(11)

International career
1962–1964	Bulgaria	9	(1)
- * Club domestic league appearances and goals

Panteley Kostadinov Dimitrov (Bulgarian: Пантелей Костадинов Димитров; 2 November 1940 – 23 June 2001) was a Bulgarian football midfielder who played for Bulgaria in the 1962 FIFA World Cup. He also played for PFC CSKA Sofia.

== Honours ==
=== Club ===
CSKA Sofia

- Bulgarian League (4): 1958–59, 1959–60, 1960–61, 1961–62
- Bulgarian Cup: 1960–61
