= Louis Overbeeke =

Dutch football player (1926–1989)

Personal information
- Date of birth: 6 September 1926
- Place of birth: Hoogerheide, Netherlands
- Date of death: 8 July 1989 (aged 62)
- Position: Forward

Senior career*
Years	Team	Apps	(Gls)
1945–1951	METO		
1951–1954	DOSKO		
1954–1961	NAC	162	(63)
1961–1965	METO		

International career
1953–1954	Netherlands	3	(0)
- * Club domestic league appearances and goals

Louis Overbeeke (6 September 1926 – 8 July 1989) was a Dutch footballer who played as a forward. He gained 3 caps for the Netherlands national team.

== Career ==
Born in Hoogerheide, Overbeeke played mainly for DOSKO and NAC, beside his hometown club METO. As a player, he was renowned for his a quick movements and powerful strike. He gained 3 caps for the Netherlands national team. During his time at NAC, he won the Eerste Klasse A in the 1954–55 season. He was a prolific scorer for NAC, and provided many assists to another NAC legend Leo Canjels.

== Personal life ==
At the time of his retirement in 1961, Overbeeke took over his family business, a gas station and a taxi stand. He died on 7 July 1989 at age 58.

== Honours ==
NAC

- Eerste Klasse A: 1954–55
