= Spytihněv =

- Municipality
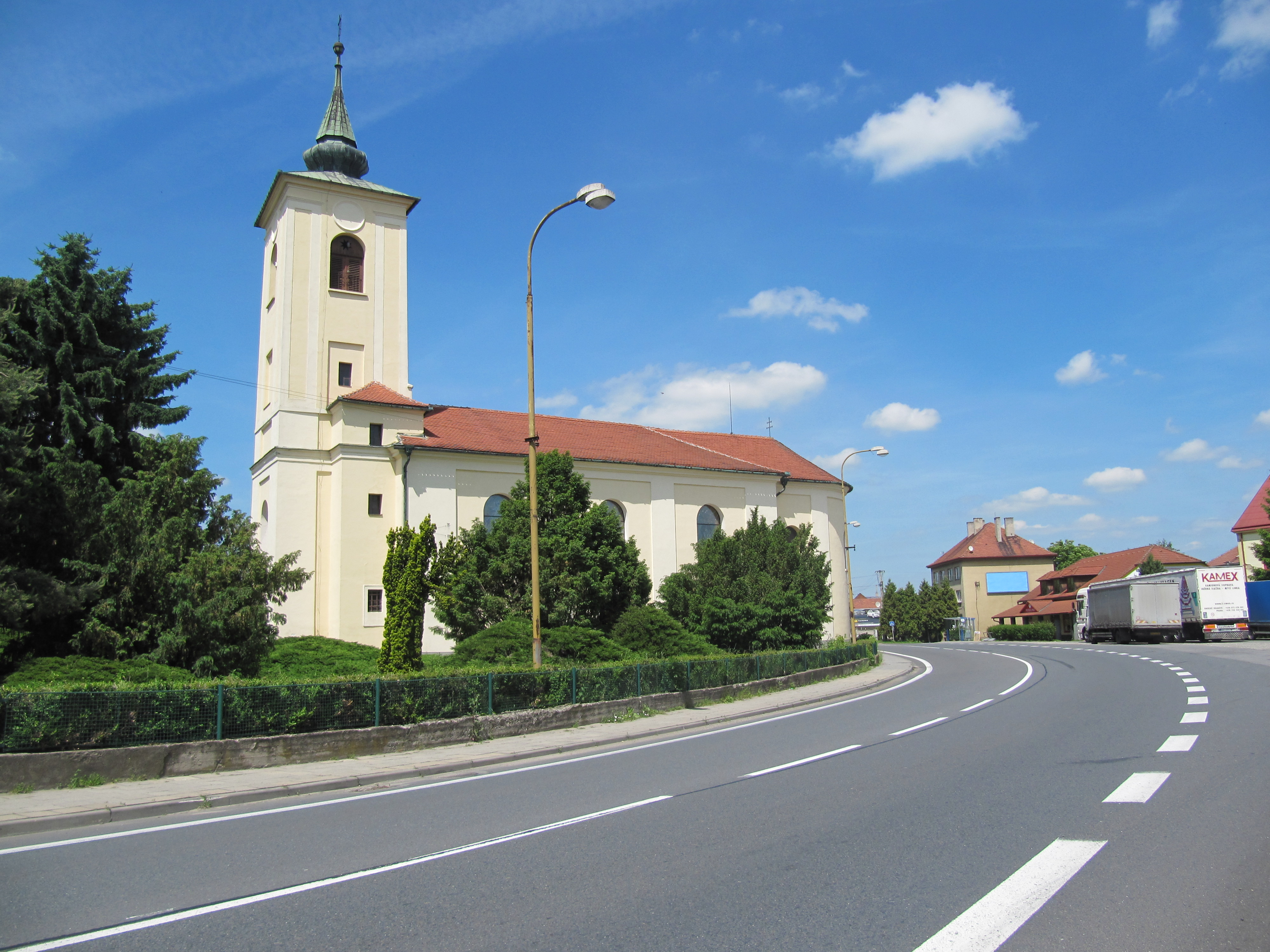
- Church of the Assumption of the Virgin Mary

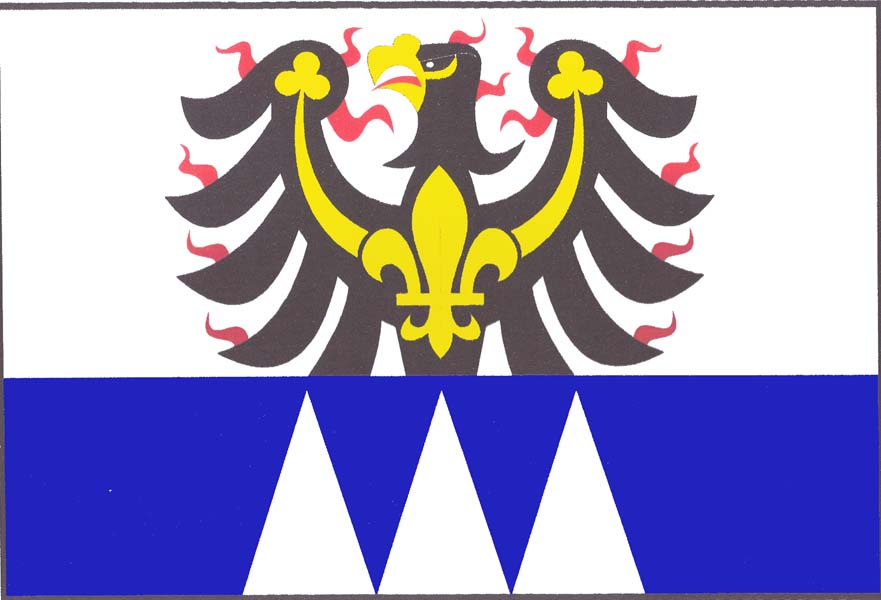
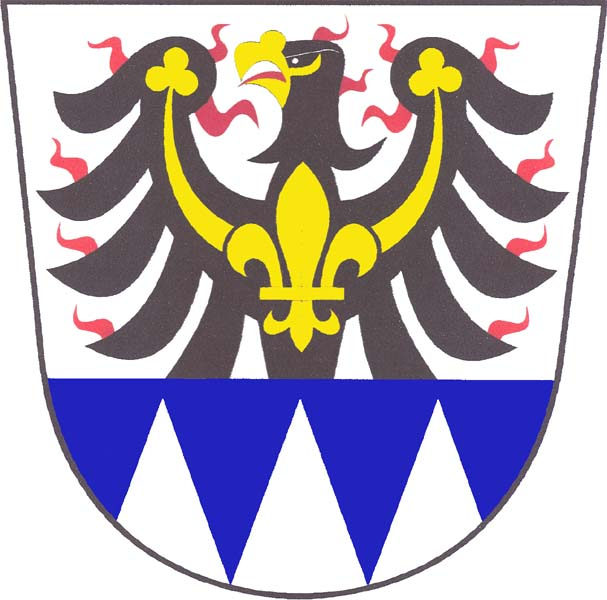
- Flag Coat of arms

- Location in the Czech Republic
- Coordinates: 49°8′28″N 17°29′53″E
- Country: Czech Republic
- Region: Zlín
- District: Zlín
- First mentioned: 1141

Area
  - Total: 9.66 km^{2} (3.73 sq mi)
- Elevation: 186 m (610 ft)

Population (2026-01-01)
  - Total: 1,618
  - Density: 167/km^{2} (434/sq mi)
- Time zone: UTC+1 (CET)
  - Summer (DST): UTC+2 (CEST)
- Postal code: 763 64
- Website: www.spytihnev.cz

Spytihněv is a municipality and village in Zlín District in the Zlín Region of the Czech Republic. It has about 1,600 inhabitants.

Spytihněv lies approximately 17 kilometres (11 mi) south-west of Zlín and 246 km (153 mi) south-east of Prague.

== History ==
The first written mention of Spytihněv is from 1141.

== Demographics ==
Historical population
Year	Pop.	±%
1869	957	—
1880	1,058	+10.6%
1890	1,228	+16.1%
1900	1,342	+9.3%
1910	1,438	+7.2%
1921	1,454	+1.1%
1930	1,371	−5.7%
1950	1,576	+15.0%
1961	1,739	+10.3%
1970	1,657	−4.7%
1980	1,650	−0.4%
1991	1,600	−3.0%
2001	1,692	+5.8%
2011	1,655	−2.2%
2021	1,643	−0.7%
Source: Censuses

== Notable people ==
- Rudolf Kučera (1940–2024), footballer
