= 1960–61 Czechoslovak First League =

Czechoslovak First League
- Season: 1960–61
- Champions: Dukla Prague
- Relegated: Rudá Hvězda Brno; Jednota Trenčín; Dynamo Praha
- European Cup: Dukla Prague
- Cup Winners' Cup: Dynamo Žilina
- Fairs Cup: Spartak Brno KPS
- Top goalscorer: Rudolf Kučera; Ladislav Pavlovič (17 goals each)

Statistics of Czechoslovak First League in the 1960–61 season.

== Overview ==
It was contested by 14 teams, and Dukla Prague won the championship. Rudolf Kučera and Ladislav Pavlovič were the league's top scorers with 17 goals each.

== Stadia and locations ==
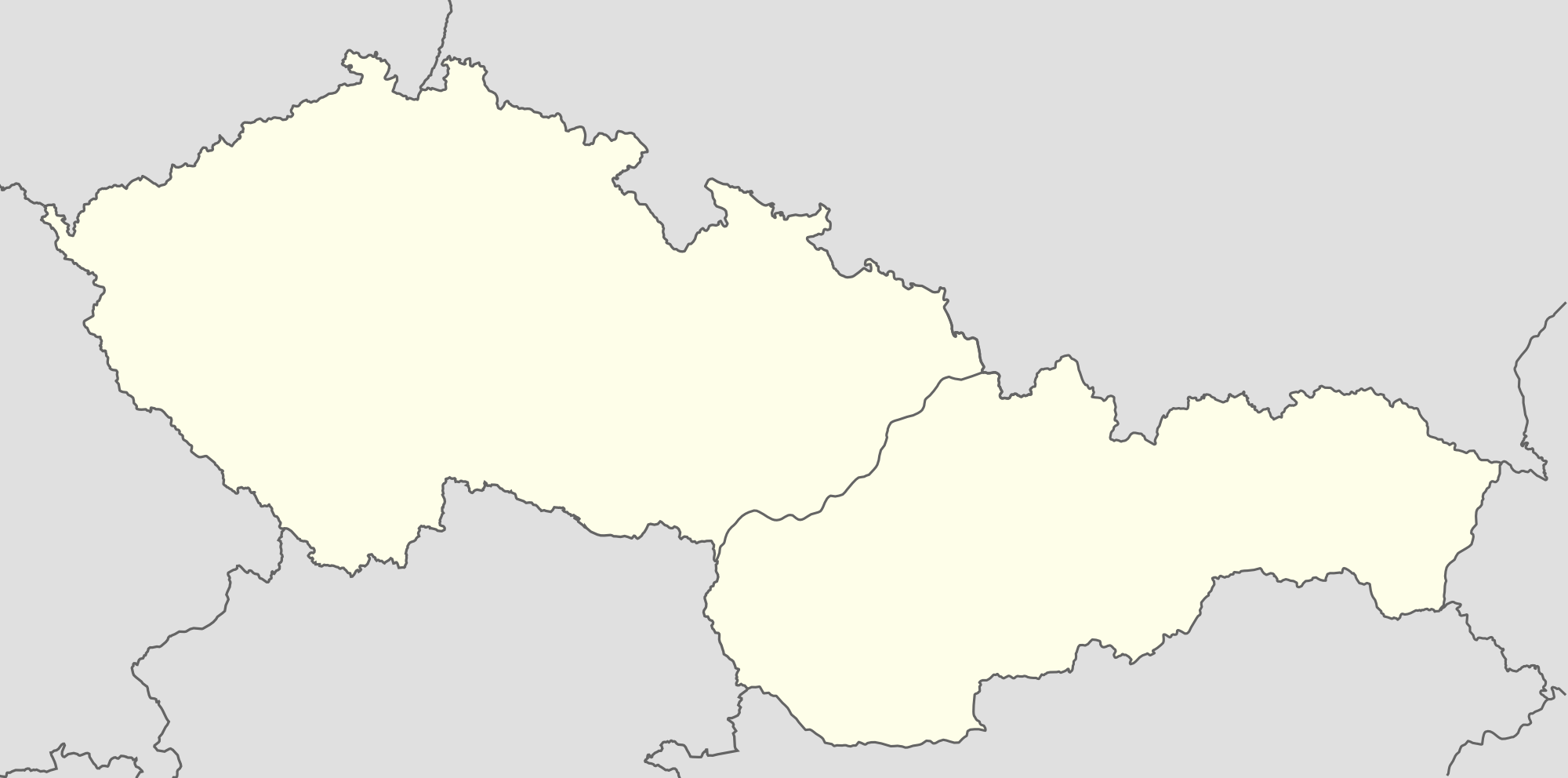
Location of clubs in the 1960–61 Czechoslovak First League

== League standings ==
Pos	Team	Pld	W	D	L	GF	GA	GR	Pts	Qualification or relegation
1	Dukla Prague (C)	26	17	5	4	66	23	2.870	39	Qualification for European Cup preliminary round
2	ČH Bratislava	26	13	6	7	43	29	1.483	32	
3	Slovan Bratislava	26	12	5	9	45	29	1.552	29	
4	Baník Ostrava	26	12	5	9	50	46	1.087	29	
5	Spartak Prague Sokolovo	26	13	3	10	44	43	1.023	29	
6	Tatran Prešov	26	11	6	9	40	37	1.081	28	
7	Spartak Prague Stalingrad	26	11	5	10	38	38	1.000	27	
8	Spartak Hradec Králové	26	9	7	10	32	35	0.914	25	
9	SONP Kladno	26	10	5	11	42	47	0.894	25	
10	Spartak Trnava	26	9	7	10	44	50	0.880	25	
11	Slovan Nitra	26	8	8	10	37	57	0.649	24	
12	Rudá Hvězda Brno (R)	26	7	6	13	37	45	0.822	20	Relegation to Czechoslovak Second League
13	Jednota Trenčín (R)	26	7	4	15	36	56	0.643	18	Relegation to Czechoslovak Second League
14	Dynamo Praha (R)	26	5	4	17	30	49	0.612	14	Relegation to Czechoslovak Second League

Source: rsssf.com
(C) Champions; (R) Relegated

Dynamo Žilina qualified for the Cup Winners' Cup as Czechoslovak Cup runners-up from a lower division.
Spartak Brno KPS invited for the Inter-Cities Fairs Cup from a lower division.

== Results ==
Home \ Away	OST	BRA	DUK	DYN	TRE	BRN	SLO	NIT	KLA	HRK	STA	SPA	TRN	PRE
Baník Ostrava		3–1	3–1	1–5	3–1	2–1	2–1	1–0	3–1	3–0	0–2	5–1	4–3	2–1
ČH Bratislava	4–1		0–0	2–0	3–2	2–1	1–0	3–1	2–0	2–0	1–1	2–0	3–1	3–1
Dukla Prague	1–0	2–2		2–1	1–0	1–1	4–0	4–0	2–1	2–1	3–1	1–1	10–1	5–0
Dynamo Prague	5–2	2–2	0–3		0–1	1–2	0–1	0–1	3–0	0–2	0–1	0–2	2–1	3–3
Jednota Trenčín	3–2	0–1	2–8	0–0		2–1	1–1	2–2	4–0	2–1	1–2	3–1	1–2	1–2
Rudá Hvězda Brno	2–0	0–3	0–2	1–3	4–2		0–0	1–1	4–0	0–1	2–3	5–3	3–2	3–0
Slovan Bratislava	2–3	2–0	2–3	2–0	5–1	4–1		0–1	0–2	2–0	4–0	4–1	6–1	0–0
Slovan Nitra	2–2	5–3	1–3	3–1	4–3	1–1	0–4		2–1	1–1	3–1	2–5	1–0	1–1
SONP Kladno	1–1	1–0	1–0	6–2	5–1	1–1	1–1	3–1		2–1	0–0	1–2	3–2	3–1
Spartak Hradec Králové	1–1	0–0	2–1	1–1	3–0	1–1	3–1	3–0	2–4		1–0	4–1	2–2	2–0
Spartak Prague Stalingrad	2–0	3–2	5–1	2–0	0–1	1–0	1–2	0–0	4–1	3–0		1–1	2–3	4–2
Spartak Sokolovo Prague	1–4	1–0	0–1	1–0	2–1	2–0	0–0	5–2	5–3	2–0	2–0		3–1	1–0
Spartak Trnava	3–2	1–1	1–1	5–0	2–0	5–1	0–1	1–1	3–1	0–0	1–1	1–0		1–0
Tatran Prešov	1–0	1–0	1–0	2–1	1–1	2–1	3–0	8–1	0–0	4–0	3–2	2–1	1–1	

Source: statistiky1ligy.fotbal.cz
Legend: Blue = home team win; Yellow = draw; Red = away team win.
