= DOSKO =

Dutch football club

- Full name: Sportvereniging Door Ons Samenspel Komt Overwinning
- Founded: 1 March 1908; 118 years ago
- Ground: Sportpark Meilust, Bergen op Zoom
- League: Sunday Derde Klasse C (South 1) (2024–25)
- Website: https://www.svdosko.nl/
Home colours

Sportvereniging Door Ons Samenspel Komt Overwinning, usually known as SV DOSKO, is a football club from Bergen op Zoom, Netherlands. They play their home matches at the Sportpark Meilust. The club's colours are red and yellow.

== History ==
=== Early years ===
SV DOSKO was founded on 1 March 1908. The club uniform was a red-yellow shirt and black shorts. A year later, DOSKO decided to play in a competition and not without success. First under the auspices of the Brabantse Voetbalbond, a regional league, but a couple of years after they start to play in the NVB, the National League. In the 1912–13 season, DOSKO is placed in the Derde Klasse.

=== Semi-professional years (1955–59) ===
In the 1955–56 season, DOSKO started as a semi-professional club, one season after the introduction of professional football in the Netherlands. 63 other Dutch clubs followed suit. The registered clubs were weighed in advance by the Royal Dutch Football Association (KNVB) for viability. The criteria for obtaining a professional license were having an accommodation for at least 7,000 spectators, a ƒ50,000 deposit and an association structure. The licensees were then randomly divided into four Eerste Klasse groups. The clubs were placed in the Eredivisie, Eerste Divisie or Tweede Divisie on the basis of their classification. The first semi-professional game against RKVV Wilhelmina in 's-Hertogenbosch was lost 4–2. Jan van de Watering was the first professional football player to score for DOSKO (1–0).

With the capacity at DOSKO home ground Rozenoord being 18,000, home games only attracted a disappointing average of 3,500 spectators. DOSKO, under the guidance of manager Frans Tausch, fared well in their first professional year and reached an 8th-place finish out of 16.

As a result, the club qualified for the Tweede Divisie for the 1956–57 season. There was a change of manager and Rein de Bruyn took over the reins of the first team. The season ended in disappointing fashion and a 12th place out of 15 teams.

The following season, the 1957–58 Tweede Divisie, was also mostly spent in the lower reaches of the league table. The result was a meagre 16 points from 26 matches as DOSKO only managed to keep DHC Delft behind them. A successful KNVB Cup run sweetened the overall impression of the season, exiting the tournament only in the fourth round to MVV Maastricht, after wins over Gilze, Willem II and NOAD. One of the key players of the DOSKO team was Rinus Bennaars, who also won caps for the Netherlands national team. Due to financial struggles at the club, they could not manage to keep Bennaars, who left for NOAD, as well as other key player Cor Machielsen, who signed with Blauw-Wit Amsterdam.

The semi-professional existence proved tough for many clubs in the Netherlands. The DOSKO board and the members saw these problems persisting, and under the guidance of manager Jan van der Gevel, DOSKO started their last season in professional football in the 1958–59 season. Only 5 matches were won and 17 lost that season, with DOSKO finishing in last place. One round before the end, the club lost to 4–1 to SV Zeist making relegation inevitable. In June 1959, chairman Theo Asselbergs had made a futile appeal to the club members to donate ƒ10,000, which would be enough to continue professional football for another year. However, there was no positive response and thus semi-professional football ended in Bergen op Zoom. During the period, DOSKO managed to foster two star players, and the club continues to be the only third-tier Tweede Divisie club to have more than one player called up to the national team. These were aforementioned Rinus Bennaars, who gained 15 caps, and Louis Overbeeke, a fast right winger who has three caps to his name.

=== Modern era ===
After the professional era, DOSKO spent many years in the Tweede Klasse. Between 1995 and 1998, they played in the Vierde Klasse, at the lowest level in Dutch football, and between 2013 and 2017, they competed in Hoofdklasse, one of the higher levels of Dutch amateur football.

In 2016, DOSKO lost 6−0 in a friendly against Eredivisie club PSV Eindhoven.

In 2018, DOSKO were relegated to the Eerste Klasse from the Hoofdklasse. They were relegated to the seventh-tier Tweede Klasse in 2023, and one season later even fell to the eighth-tier Derde Klasse.

== Former players ==
=== National team players ===
The following players were called up to represent their national teams in international football and received caps during their tenure with DOSKO:

- (Netherlands) Rinus Bennaars (1951–1958)
- (Netherlands) Louis Overbeeke (1951–1958)

- Years in brackets indicate careerspan with DOSKO.
