= Horst Hirnschrodt =

Austrian footballer

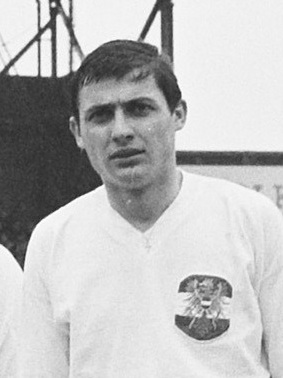
- Hirnschrodt in 1964

Personal information
- Date of birth: 5 December 1940
- Place of birth: Vienna, Austria
- Date of death: 24 May 2018 (aged 77)
- Position: Defender

Senior career*
Years	Team	Apps	(Gls)
1958–1967	Austria Wien	168	(22)
1967–1975	Austria Salzburg	179	(6)
Total		347	(28)

International career
1962–1966	Austria	19	(1)
- * Club domestic league appearances and goals

Horst Hirnschrodt (5 December 1940 – 24 May 2018) was an Austrian footballer who played for Austria Wien, Austria Salzburg and the Austria national team, as a defender.
