= Hans Rosander =

Swedish footballer (1937–2016)

Personal information
- Date of birth: 5 January 1937
- Place of birth: Kungsör, Sweden
- Date of death: 12 September 2016 (aged 79)
- Position: Defender

Senior career*
Years	Team	Apps	(Gls)
1959	Västerås		
1960–1965	Norrköping	100	(2)
1966	Eskilstuna		

International career
1963–1965	Sweden	15	(0)
- * Club domestic league appearances and goals

Hans Rosander (5 January 1937 – 12 September 2016) was a Swedish footballer who played as a defender for Västerås, Norrköping, Eskilstuna, and the national team.
