= Jørgen Rasmussen (footballer, born 1937) =

Danish footballer

Jørgen Rasmussen (born 19 February 1937) is a Danish former footballer.

During his club career he played for Boldklubben 1913. He earned 1 cap for the Denmark national football team, and was in the finals squad for the 1964 European Nations' Cup.
