= Peter Kalinke =

German footballer

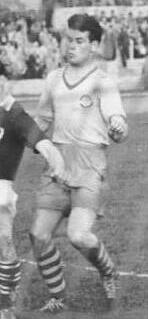
- Kalinke in 1956

Personal information
- Date of birth: 21 December 1936 (age 89)
- Place of birth: Naumburg, Germany
- Position: Right-back

International career
Years	Team	Apps	(Gls)
1960–1961	East Germany	7	(0)

Peter Kalinke (born 21 December 1936) is a German former footballer who played as a right-back. He made seven appearances for the East Germany national team from 1960 to 1961.
