= Rudolf Kučera =

Czech footballer (1940–2024)

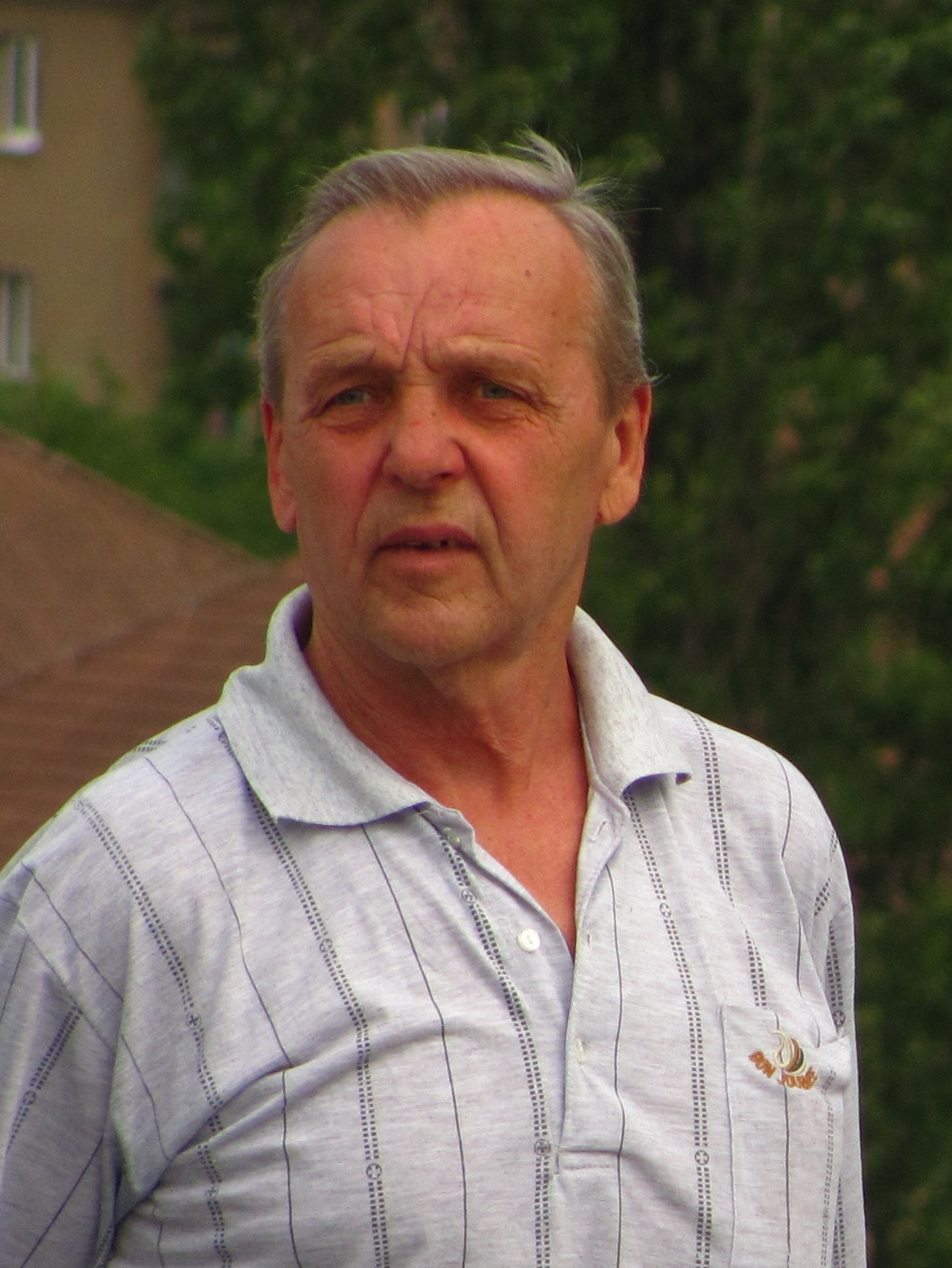
- Kučera in 2012

Personal information
- Date of birth: 23 January 1940
- Place of birth: Spytihněv, Protectorate of Bohemia and Moravia
- Date of death: 11 May 2024 (aged 84)
- Place of death: Prague, Czech Republic
- Position: Forward

Youth career
- Spytihněv

Senior career*
Years	Team	Apps	(Gls)
1952–1956	Tatran Napajedla		
1957–1959	TJ Gottwaldov		
1959–1967	Dukla Prague	121	(44)

International career
1960	Czechoslovakia Olympic	1	(0)
1961–1962	Czechoslovakia B	2	(0)
1961–1963	Czechoslovakia	7	(3)
- * Club domestic league appearances and goals

Rudolf Kučera (3 January 1940 – 11 May 2024) was a Czech footballer who played as a forward. He played his club football in Czechoslovakia, mainly for Dukla Prague, with whom he became joint top scorer of the 1960–61 Czechoslovak First League with 17 goals. He won three league titles with the club, as well as the Czechoslovak Cup in 1961.

== Club career ==
Kučera played for TJ Gottwaldov before moving to Dukla Prague in 1959. Kučera scored the first competitive goal at Stadion Juliska, opening the scoring in a 2–1 win against Wiener SK in the 1960 Mitropa Cup. In the 1960–61 Czechoslovak First League, Dukla won the league, with Kučera's 17 goals tying Ladislav Pavlovič as joint top scorer. The club also won the Czechoslovak Cup the same season, earning "the double" in the process. Further league titles followed in 1961–62 and 1962–63. In the European Cup, Kučera scored 11 times in 14 matches, ranking him third highest goalscorer overall from Czechoslovak players in the pre-Champions League era of the competition behind Jozef Adamec and Ivan Mráz.

Kučera's career was ended through injury at the age of 23. In a 1963–64 European Cup match against Polish side Górnik Zabrze, Kučera was injured following an elbow to the head from defender Stanisław Oślizło and never played at the top level again.

== International career ==
Kučera played internationally for Czechoslovakia, making his international debut at Dalymount Park in a 3–1 win for his country against Republic of Ireland in a World Cup qualifier on 8 October 1961. In total he scored three goals in seven appearances between 1961 and 1963, although he missed the 1962 FIFA World Cup due to injury. He also represented Czechoslovakia B on two occasions between 1961 and 1962.

== Death ==
Kučera died in Prague on 11 May 2024, at the age of 84.

== Career statistics ==
Scores and results list Czechoslovakia's goal tally first, score column indicates score after each Kučera goal.

List of international goals scored by Rudolf Kučera
No.	Date	Venue	Opponent	Score	Result	Competition
1	16 September 1962	Praterstadion, Vienna, Austria	Austria	1–0	6–0	Friendly
2	16 September 1962	Praterstadion, Vienna, Austria	Austria	5–0	6–0	Friendly
3	21 November 1962	Walter Ulbricht Stadion, East Berlin, East Germany	East Germany	1–2	1–2	1964 European Nations' Cup qualifying

== Honours ==
Dukla Prague

- Czechoslovak First League: 1960–61, 1961–62, 1962–63
- Czechoslovak Cup: 1960–61

Individual

- Czechoslovak First League top scorer: 1960–61 (shared)
