= 1961 Danish 1st Division =

16th season of Danish 1st Division

Danish 1st Division
- Season: 1961

Statistics of Danish 1st Division in the 1961 season.

== Overview ==
It was contested by 12 teams, and Esbjerg fB won the championship. Skovshoved IF and AI Aarhus, now known as Idrætsforeningen AIA-Tranbjerg were relegated to the 2nd Division

== League standings ==
Pos	Team	Pld	W	D	L	GF	GA	GD	Pts
1	Esbjerg fB	22	15	3	4	52	18	+34	33
2	Kjøbenhavns Boldklub	22	15	3	4	73	41	+32	33
3	Boldklubben 1913	22	14	0	8	47	32	+15	28
4	Boldklubben 1903	22	10	4	8	32	27	+5	24
5	Aarhus Gymnastikforening	22	11	2	9	40	38	+2	24
6	Boldklubben 1909	22	10	2	10	44	45	−1	22
7	Vejle Boldklub	22	10	0	12	42	51	−9	20
8	Frederikshavn fI	22	7	5	10	29	49	−20	19
9	Køge BK	22	8	2	12	49	46	+3	18
10	Odense Boldklub	22	7	4	11	34	38	−4	18
11	Skovshoved IF	22	5	5	12	23	43	−20	15
12	AIA	22	4	2	16	19	56	−37	10

== Results ==
Home \ Away	AGF	AIA	B03	B09	B13	EFB	FGI	KB	KBK	OB	SKO	VBK
Aarhus GF	—	2–1	2–0	1–4	0–2	4–1	7–0	2–5	2–1	1–5	2–0	0–2
AI Aarhus	1–3	—	1–2	1–6	0–1	0–5	0–2	4–2	1–3	2–1	2–3	0–3
B 1903	1–2	0–1	—	2–1	2–1	0–1	1–1	0–0	2–1	0–2	1–0	3–0
B 1909	1–3	1–0	1–2	—	4–2	0–1	3–2	0–6	6–4	4–0	0–3	1–3
B 1913	3–0	4–0	3–1	1–0	—	2–0	0–3	4–5	4–0	2–0	0–2	4–2
Esbjerg fB	4–2	6–0	1–1	1–1	0–1	—	2–0	3–1	2–0	0–0	1–0	6–1
Frederikshavn fI	1–0	2–2	2–1	1–3	2–1	0–7	—	2–4	1–1	1–1	1–1	3–1
Kjøbenhavns BK	2–2	3–1	2–2	8–2	3–0	3–2	4–1	—	3–1	2–0	7–1	5–2
Køge BK	1–2	1–2	2–4	1–2	5–2	1–2	4–1	3–0	—	3–2	3–0	5–2
Odense BK	1–1	2–0	2–3	3–2	2–3	0–3	1–2	5–2	1–0	—	2–2	0–2
Skovshoved IF	1–0	0–0	0–4	0–0	1–5	1–2	1–0	1–2	2–2	1–3	—	0–2
Vejle BK	1–2	4–0	1–0	0–2	0–2	0–2	4–1	3–4	3–7	2–1	4–3	—

Legend: Blue = home team win; Yellow = draw; Red = away team win.
