= Jerzy Jóźwiak =

Polish footballer

Personal information
- Date of birth: 18 August 1939
- Place of birth: Maidières, France
- Date of death: 13 September 1982 (aged 43)
- Place of death: Bytom, Poland
- Position: Left winger

Senior career*
Years	Team	Apps	(Gls)
1958–1968	Polonia Bytom		
1969–1971	Śląsk Świętochłowice		

International career
1962	Poland	1	(0)
- * Club domestic league appearances and goals

Jerzy Jóźwiak (18 August 1939 – 13 September 1982) was a Polish footballer who played as a left winger.

He made one appearance for the Poland national team, in a friendly against Morocco on 11 October 1962.

== Honours ==
Polonia Bytom

- Ekstraklasa: 1962
