= Rinus Bennaars =

Dutch footballer (1931–2021)

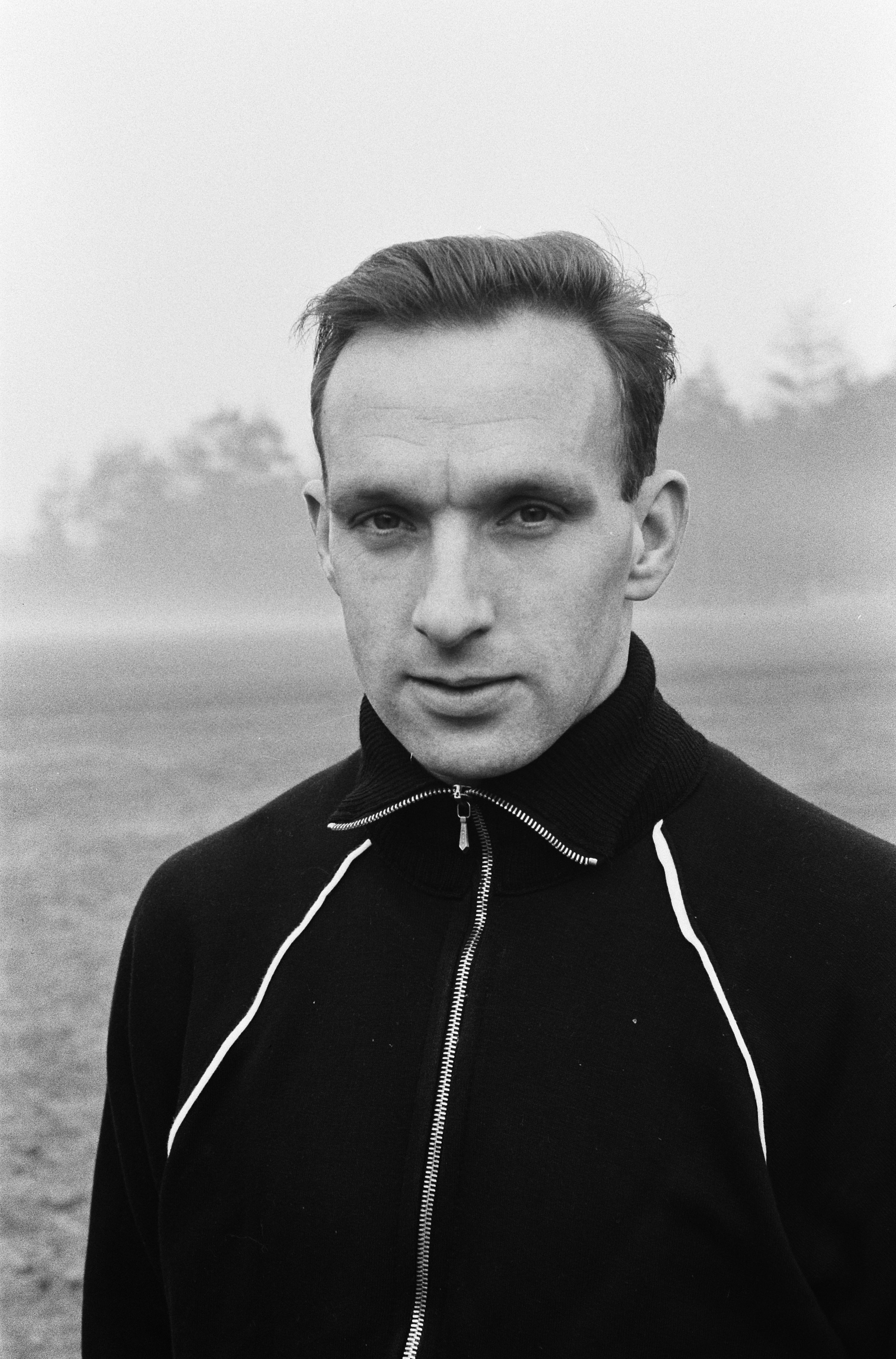
- Bennaars in 1963

Personal information
- Full name: Marinus Apolonia Bennaars
- Date of birth: 14 October 1931
- Place of birth: Bergen op Zoom, Netherlands
- Date of death: 8 November 2021 (aged 90)
- Place of death: Bergen op Zoom, Netherlands
- Position: Midfielder

Youth career
- Nieuw-Borgvliet
- 1946-1951: DOSKO

Senior career*
Years	Team	Apps	(Gls)
1951–1958	DOSKO		
1958–1959	NOAD	28	(10)
1959–1964	Feijenoord	132	(42)
1964–1966	DFC	54	(14)

International career
1951–1964	Netherlands	15	(2)
- * Club domestic league appearances and goals

Rinus Bennaars (14 October 1931 – 8 November 2021) was a Dutch professional footballer who played as a midfielder.

== Club career ==
Bennaars started his career before professional football was established in the Netherlands. When professional football was introduced in the country, Bennaars and SV DOSKO began playing in the Dutch Second Division. After three years at DOSKO, Bennaars joined NOAD for one season before transferring to Feijenoord. In his second season with Feijenoord, Bennaars won his first trophy when the club won the Eredivisie. They retained the title the following season, and Bennaars was recalled to the Netherlands national team again, nine years after his last call-up. He left Feijenoord after five seasons and went to play another two years in the Second Division at DFC, where he won the championship of that division in his first season. After his second season at the club Bennaars retired from professional football.

== International career ==
On 25 November 1951, while playing for DOSKO, Bennaars played his first match for the Netherlands national team in Rotterdam versus Belgium. The Netherlands lost the match 7–6, but Bennaars managed to score one of the Dutch goals. Until 19 May 1954, he played ten times for the national team. In 1963, he played in another five matches, bringing his total caps to 15. He played one match at the 1952 Summer Olympics.

== Personal life ==
Upon retiring, Bennaars worked for Dutch Railways. He and his wife, Corry, lost two daughters in infancy. His wife later died of Parkinson's disease in 2005. Bennaars died in his home-town Bergen op Zoom on 8 November 2021, at the age of 90.
