= Reinier Kreijermaat =

Dutch footballer

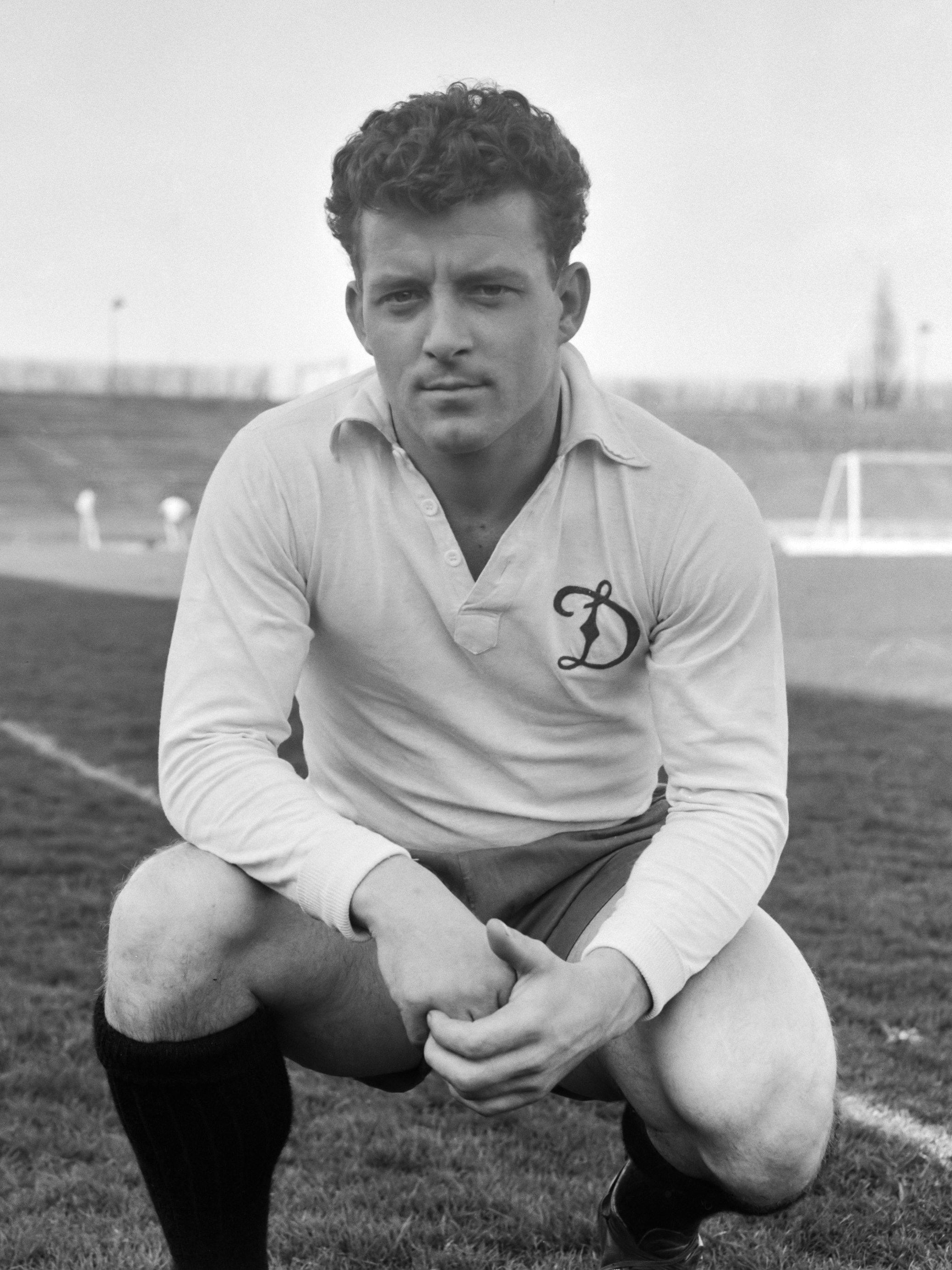
- Reinier Kreijermaat (1961)

Personal information
- Full name: Reinier Kreijermaat
- Date of birth: 25 April 1935
- Place of birth: Zuilen, Netherlands
- Date of death: 22 January 2018 (aged 82)
- Place of death: Barendrecht, Netherlands
- Position: Midfielder

Youth career
- USV Elinkwijk

Senior career*
| Years | Team | Apps | (Gls) |
| 1956–1959 | USV Elinkwijk | 95 | (13) |
| 1959–1967 | Feyenoord | 147 | (31) |
| 1967–1968 | Xerxes/DHC | 4 | (0) |

International career^{‡}
| 1961 | Netherlands | 2 | (0) |
- * Club domestic league appearances and goals as of 9 June 2007 ‡ National team caps and goals as of 9 June 2007

Reinier Kreijermaat (25 April 1935 – 22 January 2018) was a Dutch footballer who was active as a midfielder in the 1960s.

== Career ==
Kreijermaat made his professional debut for USV Elinkwijk in 1956. He played for Elinkwijk until 1959, when he moved to Dutch heavyweights Feyenoord. He would spend the majority of his career playing for Feyenoord, winning three Eredivisie championships in the early 1960s and one Dutch Cup. He left the Rotterdam-club in 1967, finishing his career at Xerxes/DHC the following year.

He scored a total of 42 goals in his professional career and never received a yellow or red card.

== Honours ==
Feyenoord

- Eredivisie: 1960-61, 1961-62, 1964-65
- KNVB Cup: 1964-65
