= Bent Løfqvist =

Danish footballer (born 1936)

Personal information
- Full name: Bent Løfqvist-Hansen
- Date of birth: 26 February 1936 (age 90)
- Place of birth: Denmark
- Position: Striker

Senior career*
Years	Team	Apps	(Gls)
1958–1962	B 1913		
1962–1966	FC Metz	67	(26)
1966–1968	OB		

International career
1961	Denmark	1	(0)
- * Club domestic league appearances and goals

Bent Løfqvist-Hansen (born 26 February 1936) is a Danish former footballer who played at both professional and international levels as a striker.

== Career ==
=== Club ===
Løfqvist played club football in Denmark for B 1913 and OB, and in France for FC Metz. He was top scorer of the 1962 European Cup, scoring a total of seven goals in the competition.

=== International ===
He also earned one cap for the Danish national side in 1961.
