= Frans Bouwmeester =

Dutch footballer

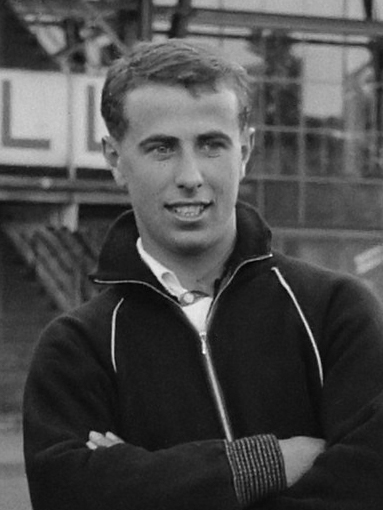
- Frans Bouwmeester in 1961

Personal information
- Full name: Frans Bouwmeester
- Date of birth: 19 May 1940 (age 86)
- Place of birth: Breda, Netherlands
- Position: Forward

Youth career
- NAC

Senior career*
Years	Team	Apps	(Gls)
1956–1960	NAC	99	(25)
1960–1966	Feijenoord	139	(43)
1966–1969	NAC	66	(5)
1969–1970	Racing White	1	(0)
1970–1971	DFC	23	(2)
Total		328	(75)

International career
1959–1968	Netherlands	5	(0)
- * Club domestic league appearances and goals

Frans Bouwmeester (born 19 May 1940 in Breda) is a retired Dutch footballer who was active as a left winger and was later chief scout at Feyenoord.

== Club career ==
Bouwmeester started his career in his town of birth, Breda where he played for NAC. After three seasons at this team he made a switch towards Feijenoord. This turned out to be the most successful period in his career. In both 1961 and 1962 Feijenoord took the Eredivisie Championship. In 1965 Bouwmeester and Feijenoord won both the league and the KNVB Cup.

== International career ==
From 1959 to 1968 Bouwmeester was also called up to represent the Netherlands national football team. He made his debut in a 7-0 loss versus West Germany on 21 October 1959. In total he would play in five international matches, the final one an October 1968 FIFA World Cup qualification match against Bulgaria.

== Scouting career ==
After his career Bouwmeester became a scout at Willem II from 1992 to 1994. After that he became head scout at Feyenoord. He was a scout for hometown club NAC from 2005 to 2014.

== Personal life ==
Bouwmeester suffered from a stroke after he had a kidney transplant in 2014, receiving a kidney from his daughter. His nephew Frans Bouwmeester jr. also played for NAC.
