= Georgi Naydenov (footballer, born 1931) =

Bulgarian footballer and manager

Personal information
- Full name: Georgi Spirov Naydenov
- Date of birth: 21 December 1931
- Place of birth: Sofia, Bulgaria
- Date of death: 28 May 1970 (aged 38)
- Place of death: Damascus, Syria
- Height: 1.79 m (5 ft 10 in)
- Position: Goalkeeper

Senior career*
| Years | Team | Apps | (Gls) |
| 1949–1950 | Cherveno Zname | 10 | (0) |
| 1950–1954 | Spartak Sofia | 84 | (0) |
| 1955–1965 | CSKA Sofia | 176 | (0) |
| 1966–1967 | Spartak Sofia | 28 | (0) |
| Total | | 298 | (0) |

International career
| 1955–1966 | Bulgaria | 51 | (0) |
- * Club domestic league appearances and goals

Olympic medal record

Men's Football
| Bronze medal – third place | 1956 Melbourne | Team competition |

Georgi Spirov Naydenov (Bulgarian: Георги Спиров Найденов) (21 December 1931 – 28 May 1970) was a Bulgarian football goalkeeper and manager. He is considered the greatest Bulgarian goalkeeper of all time. Between 1955 and 1965 he played in 176 matches for CSKA Sofia. He was honoured as Bulgarian Footballer of the Year in 1961. Naydenov won the top Bulgarian league, the A PFG, 8 times (all with CSKA), as well as the Bulgarian Cup, 3 times (all with CSKA). He was respected for his incredible work ethic and his determination during training and matches alike.

== International career ==
For the Bulgaria national football team Naydenov featured in 51 games and won a bronze medal at the 1956 Summer Olympics. He played for his country at the 1962 and 1966 World Cups. Even after he had retired from competing he still remained one of the fittest players in Bulgaria and this made his death all the more mysterious. He died in Damascus, Syria and initial reports claimed he had suffered a heart attack although members of his family and people close to him suspected he had been poisoned.

== Honours ==
=== Player ===
- CSKA Sofia
  - Bulgarian League: 8 times – 1955, 1956, 1957, 1958, 1959, 1960, 1961, 1962
  - Bulgarian Cup: 3 times – 1955, 1961, 1965

Awards
| Preceded by none | Bulgarian Footballer of the Year; 1961 | Succeeded by Ivan Kolev |
