= Ivan Rankov =

Bulgarian footballer (born 1940)

Personal information
- Full name: Ivan Aleksandrov Rankov
- Date of birth: 5 January 1940 (age 86)
- Place of birth: Novi Iskar, Sofia, Bulgaria
- Position: Right winger

Youth career
- Urozhay
- Zavod 12 Sofia
- –1956: Levski Sofia

Senior career*
Years	Team	Apps	(Gls)
????–1958	Slavia Sofia	1	
1958–1960	Botev Plovdiv		
1960–1965	CDNA Sofia/CSKA Red Flag	114	(29)
1964	CSKA Red Flag II	1	(1)
1965–1968	Spartak Sofia		

International career
1957–1959	Bulgaria U18	2+	(0+)
1963–1964	Bulgaria	4	(0)
- * Club domestic league appearances and goals

Ivan Aleksandrov Rankov (Bulgarian: Иван Александров Ранков; born 5 January 1940) is a Bulgarian former footballer who played as a right winger.

== Early life ==
Born in the Kumaritsa district of Novi Iskar, Sofia, Rankov began playing football with Urozhay in his home district. He later trained with Levski Sofia under Kotse Georgiev until 1956, but was unable to play for them because of a regulation requiring players to play for teams within their region.

== Career ==
Rankov began his career at Slavia Sofia, where he made three appearances, including two in the Bulgarian Cup, but couldn't break into the team due to Aleksandar Kostov. At the suggestion of his coach, he joined Botev Plovdiv, where he began to play more regularly. In December 1958, he joined the Bulgarian Armed Forces as a volunteer, where he only served for two weeks in a communications regiment, alongside musician Emil Dimitrov and actor Kliment Denchev.

In the summer of 1960, he joined CDNA Sofia, where he made a total of 135 appearances, scoring 43 goals and helping them win two A Group titles and two Bulgarian Cups. Additionally, he played one match for the club's reserve team in 1964, where he scored. That same year, he received an offer to join Stade de Reims, but rejected it due to fears of what would happen to his family. His final match for the club was on 18 July 1965, where he got two assists in a 3–2 win against Beroe Stara Zagora. Shortly after, he found out in a newspaper that he had been released by the club.

Afterwards, he joined Spartak Sofia, where he played until 1968.

== International career ==
Rankov made his debut for the Bulgaria under-18 national team in 1957, in a 1–1 draw against East Germany in Leningrad. In 1959, he represented them at the 1959 UEFA European Under-18 Championship, where they beat Italy in the final to win.

He later made four appearances for the Bulgaria national team between 1963 and 1964.
