= 1971–72 Inter Milan season =

Inter Milan
1971–72 season
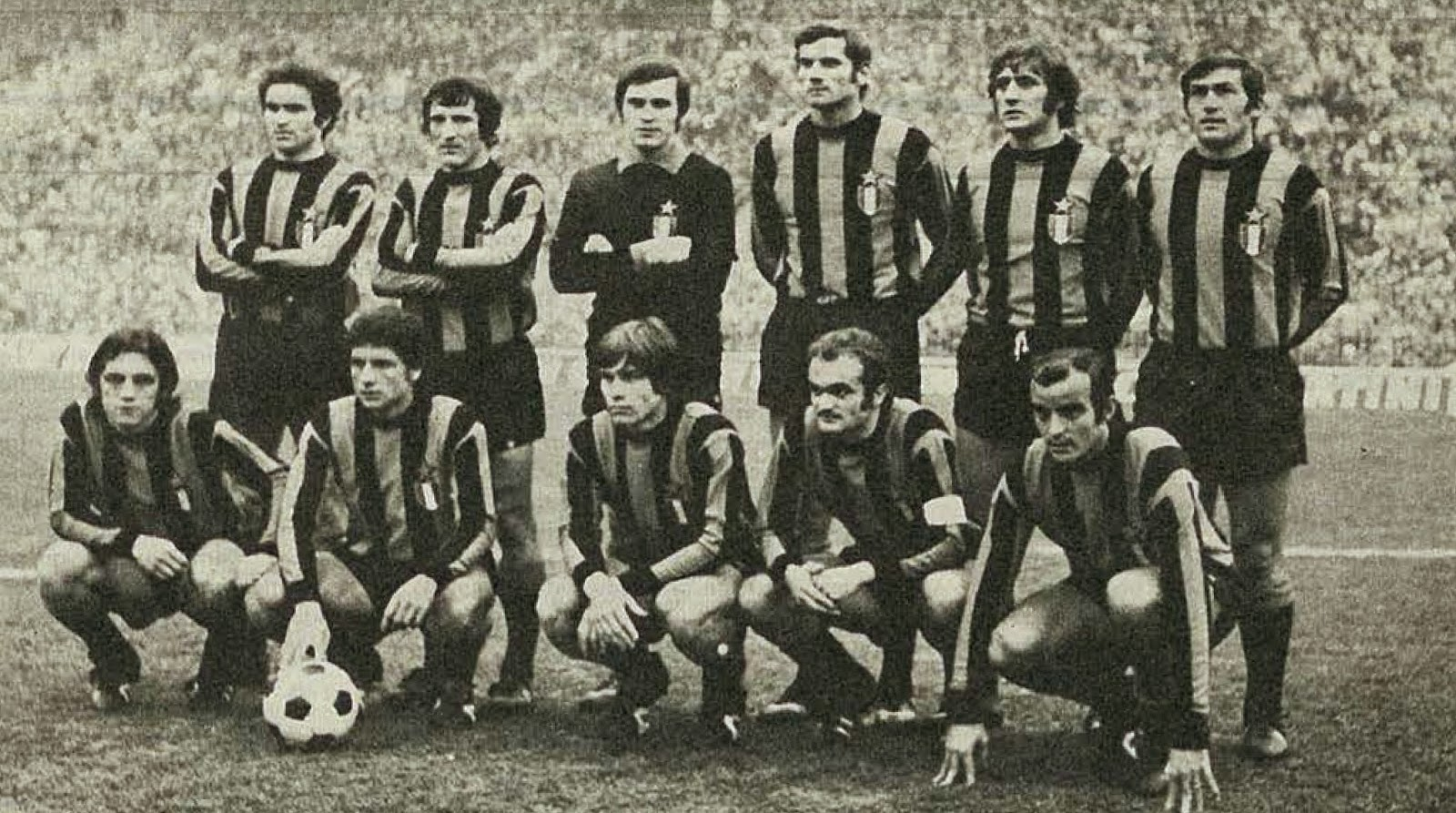
- President: Ivanoe Fraizzoli
- Manager: Giovanni Invernizzi
- Stadium: San Siro
- Serie A: 5th
- Coppa Italia: 2nd round
- European Cup: Runners-up
- Top goalscorer: League: Roberto Boninsegna (22); All: Boninsegna (34)
Home colours	Away colours

During the 1971–72 season Inter Milan competed in Serie A, Coppa Italia and 1971–72 European Cup.

== Summary ==
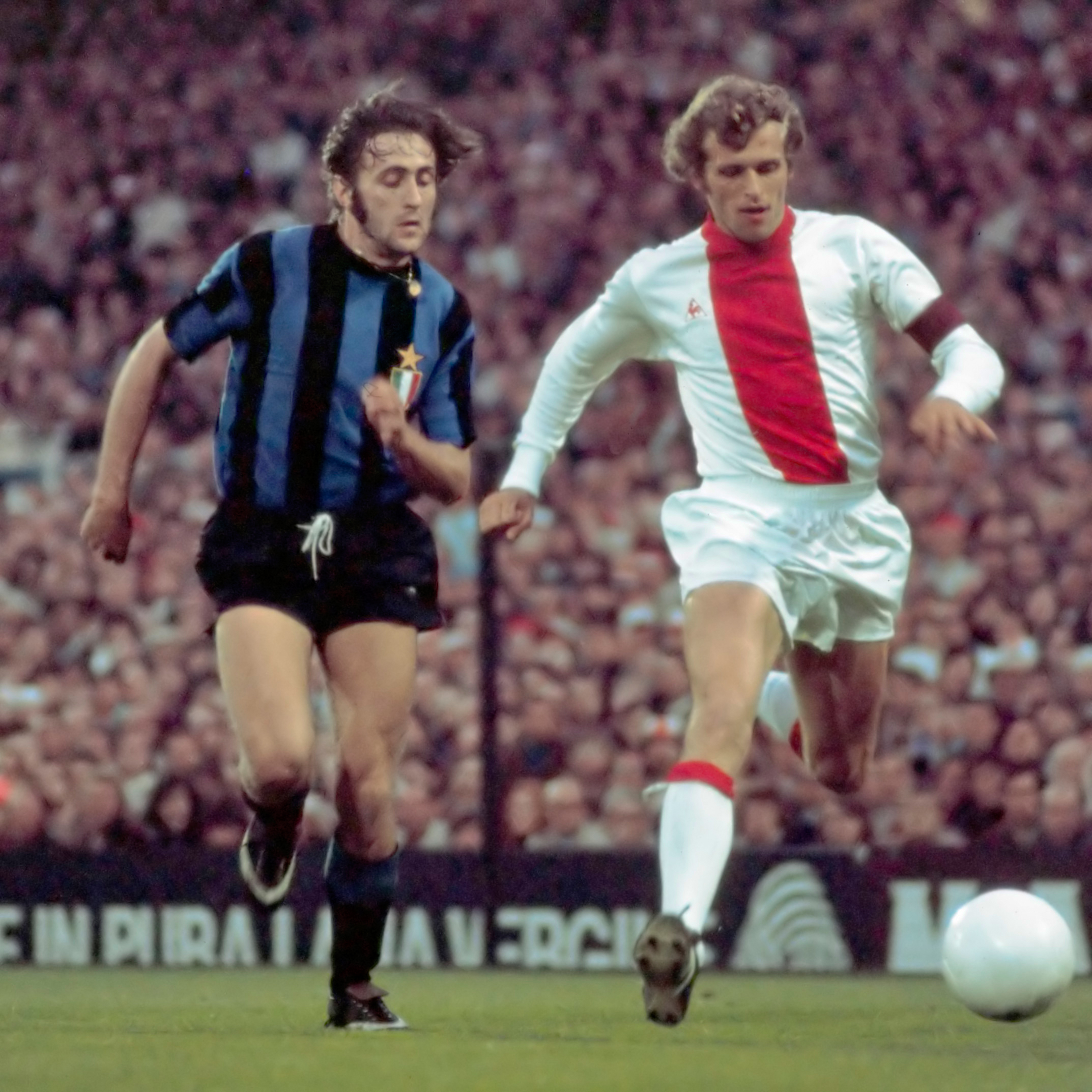
Mauro Bellugi and Piet Keizer (right) playing the 1972 European Cup Final

An ageing squad collapsed in League to the 5th position clinching a UEFA spot for the next year.

In European Cup the club after 4 years returned to the highest continental tournament. In eightfinals the team played against German side Borussia Mönchengladbach, the first leg of the series was a bizarre event. In the seventh minute the Germans score the first thanks to Jupp Heynckes. Twelve minutes later Forward Roberto Boninsegna scored the draw, however few minutes later Ulrik le Fevre made the 2–1.

At minute 29, Boninsegna on the field side was hit by a Coca-Cola can and felt down over the grass. The squad included head coach Invernizzi, asked the Dutch referee Jef Dorpmans the suspension of the match.

Invernizzi replaced Boninsegna, according to the Inter medical staff. The Dutch referee ordered the match to be played and in the next 60 minutes the Germans score 5 times thanks to the permissiveness by Inter;.

Few days later, UEFA annulled the match, rescheduling on 1 December 1971 at Berlin, a neutral venue. Finally, Inter advanced to the quarterfinals after a 4–2 won at San Siro, and a 0–0 score on the replay. The Neroazzurro clinched the 1972 European Cup Final only to be defeated by Johan Cruijff's Ajax with a 0–2 score.

== Squad ==
Note: Flags indicate national team as defined under FIFA eligibility rules; some limited exceptions apply. Players may hold more than one non-FIFA nationality.

Pos.	Nation	Player
GK	ITA	Ivano Bordon
GK	ITA	Lido Vieri
DF	ITA	Mauro Bellugi
DF	ITA	Tarcisio Burgnich
DF	ITA	Bernardino Fabbian
DF	ITA	Giacinto Facchetti
DF	ITA	Mario Giubertoni
DF	ITA	Graziano Bini
MF	ITA	Gianfranco Bedin
MF	ITA	Mario Bertini

Pos.	Nation	Player
MF	ITA	Mario Corso
MF	ITA	Mario Frustalupi
MF	ITA	Sandro Mazzola
MF	ITA	Gabriele Oriali
MF	ITA	Evert Skoglund
FW	ITA	Roberto Boninsegna
FW	BRA	Jair da Costa
FW	ITA	Sergio Pellizzaro
FW	ITA	Roberto Dioni
FW	ITA	Giampiero Ghio

=== Transfers ===
In
Pos.	Name	To	Type
DF	Graziano Bini		
MF	Evert Skoglund		
FW	Roberto Dioni		
FW	Giampiero Ghio		

Out
Pos.	Name	from	Type
DF	Giancarlo Cella	Piacenza	
DF	Spartaco Landini	Palermo	
DF	Oscar Righetti	Piacenza	loan
MF	Marco Achilli	Livorno	
FW	Alberto Reif	Hellas Verona	

== Competitions ==
=== Serie A ===
==== League table ====
Pos	Team	Pld	W	D	L	GF	GA	GD	Pts	Qualification or relegation
3	Torino	30	17	8	5	39	25	+14	42	Qualification to UEFA Cup
4	Cagliari	30	15	9	6	39	23	+16	39	Qualification to UEFA Cup
5	Internazionale	30	13	10	7	49	28	+21	36	Qualification to UEFA Cup
6	Fiorentina	30	12	12	6	28	20	+8	36	Qualification to UEFA Cup
7	Roma	30	13	9	8	37	31	+6	35	

Source: Panini

==== Results by round ====
Round	1	2	3	4	5	6	7	8	9	10	11	12	13	14	15	16	17	18	19	20	21	22	23	24	25	26	27	28	29	30	31
Ground	H	A	H	A	H	A	H	A	H	A	A	H	A	H	A	H	A	H	A	H	A	H	A	H	A	H	H	A	A	H	A
Result	W	W	W	L	W	D	L	W	D	P	D	D	W	D	W	W	L	W	L	D	L	W	D	D	L	W	D	L	D	W	W
Position	1	1	1	2	1	2	5	2	3	5	5	7	3	4	3	3	4	4	4	6	6	6	6	6	7	6	6	6	7	6	5

Source: Competitive matches
A = Away; H = Home; W = Win; D = Draw; L = Loss; P = Postponed; = Leader, qualified to the 1972–73 European Cup; = 1972–73 UEFA Cup; = Relegation to 1972–73 Serie B

==== Matches ====
3 October 1971 1	Inter Milan	2–0	Atalanta BC	Milan
	Mazzola 15'; Boninsegna 89' (pen.)			Stadium: San Siro; Referee: Gialluisi

17 October 1971 2	Catanzaro	0–2	Inter Milan	Catanzaro
			63' Bedin; 80' Facchetti	Stadium: Stadio Militare; Referee: Monti

24 October 1971 3	Inter Milan	4–1	Hellas Verona	Milan
	S. Mazzola 44', 75'; Bedin 59'; Boninsegna 64'		77' Reif	Stadium: San Siro; Referee: Pieroni (Rome)

31 October 1971 4	AS Roma	3–1	Inter Milan	Rome
	La Rosa 11'; Cappellini 36'; Salvori 86'		48' Boninsegna	Stadium: Olimpico; Referee: Angonese (Mestre)

7 November 1971 5	Inter Milan	2–0	Torino	Milan
	Bertini 74'; Boninsegna 76'			Stadium: San Siro; Referee: Giunti (Arezzo)

14 November 1971 6	SSC Napoli	0–0	Inter Milan	Naples
				Stadium: Stadio San Paolo; Referee: Lattanzi (Rome)

28 November 1971 7	Inter Milan	2–3	AC Milan	Milan
	Ghio 18'; Boninsegna 42'		2', 85' Bigon; 30' Rivera	Stadium: San Siro; Referee: Lo Bello

5 December 1971 8	Bologna	0–3	Inter Milan	Bologna
			14' Facchetti; 21', 31' Boninsegna	Stadium: Comunale; Referee: Gonella

12 December 1971 9	Inter Milan	0–0	Cagliari	Milan
				Stadium: San Siro; Referee: Menegali

19 December 1971 10	Lanerossi Vicenza	suspd.	Inter Milan	Vicenza
				Stadium: Romeo Menti; Referee: Toselli
Note: Match suspended at 17' due to heavy fog with a 0–0 score.

26 December 1971 11	Fiorentina	0–0	Inter Milan	Florence
				Stadium: Comunale; Referee: Monti

2 January 1972 12	Inter Milan	0–0	Juventus	Milan
				Stadium: San Siro; Referee: Lo Bello

6 January 1972 10	Lanerossi Vicenza	0–4	Inter Milan	Vicenza
			60', 87' Boninsegna; 63' Bertini; 69' Mazzola	Stadium: Romeo Menti; Referee: Toselli (Cormons)
Note: Match rescheduled from 19 December 1971

9 January 1972 13	Inter Milan	4–4	Sampdoria	Milan
	Boninsegna 43' (pen.), 56' (pen.), 65'; Corso 53'		34' Boni; 62' Santin; 74' Lippi; 86' (pen.) Suarez	Stadium: San Siro; Referee: Lattanzi

16 January 1972 14	Mantova 1911	1–6	Inter Milan	Mantua
	Dell'Angelo 70'		16', 67' Boninsegna; 55', 82' Bertini; 60' Pellizzaro; 87' Facchetti	Stadium: Danilo Martinelli; Referee: Michelotti

23 January 1972 15	Inter Milan	2–0	Varese	Milan
	Boninsegna 60'; Mazzola 87'			Stadium: San Siro; Referee: Branzoni (Pavia)

30 January 1972 16	Atalanta BC	1–0	Inter Milan	Bergamo
	Moro 33'			Stadium: Comunale; Referee: Serafino

6 January 1972 17	Inter Milan	1–0	Catanzaro	Milan
	Mazzola 47'			Stadium: San Siro; Referee: Giunti

13 February 1972 18	Hellas Verona	2–0	Inter Milan	Verona
	Orazi 23'; Mariani 78'			Stadium: Stadio Marcantonio Bentegodi; Referee: Pieroni (Rome)

20 February 1972 19	Inter Milan	2–2	AS Roma	Milan
	Jair 4'; Mazzola 56'		44', 82' La Rosa	Stadium: San Siro; Referee: Angonese

27 February 1972 20	Torino	2–1	Inter Milan	Turin
	P. Pulici 37'; Mazzola 84' (o.g.)		60' Boninsegna	Stadium: Comunale; Referee: Toselli

12 March 1972 21	Inter Milan	2–0	SSC Napoli	Milan
	Panzanato 38' (o.g.); Giubertoni 89'			Stadium: San Siro; Referee: Lo Bello

19 March 1972 22	AC Milan	1–1	Inter Milan	Milan
	Benetti 53'		84' Boninsegna	Stadium: San Siro; Referee: Angonese (Mestre)

26 March 1972 23	Inter Milan	1–1	Bologna	Milan
	Corso 78'		48' Landini	Stadium: San Siro; Referee: Giunti (Arezzo)

1 April 1972 24[27]	Cagliari	2–1	Inter Milan	Cagliari
	Riva 31'; Brugnera 75'		25' (pen.) Boninsegna	Stadium: Sant'Elia; Referee: Lo Bello (Siracusa)

9 April 1972 25	Inter	2–1	Lanerossi Vicenza	Milan
	Boninsegna 48' (pen.); Facchetti 51'		63' (pen.) Maraschi	Stadium: San Siro; Referee: Trono

16 April 1972 26	Inter Milan	1–1	Fiorentina	Milan
	Bedin 81'		30' De Sisti	Stadium: San Siro; Referee: Francescon

23 April 1972 27	Juventus	3–0	Inter Milan	Turin
	Causio 7', 27', 85'			Stadium: Comunale; Referee: Pieroni

7 May 1972 28	Sampdoria	0–0	Inter Milan	Genoa
				Stadium: Luigi Ferraris; Referee: Michelotti (Parma)

21 May 1972 29	Inter Milan	2–0	Mantova 1911	Milan
	Boninsegna 74', 79'			Stadium: San Siro; Referee: Lattanzi

27 May 1972 30	Varese	0–3	Inter Milan	Varese
			27' Boninsegna; 62' Pellizzaro; 76' Frustalupi	Stadium: Franco Ossola; Referee: Panzino (Catanzaro)
Note: Match rescheduled from May 28th due to the 1972 European Cup Final.

=== Coppa Italia ===
==== First round ====
===== Group 1 =====
Pos	Team	Pld	W	D	L	GF	GA	GD	Pts
1	Internazionale	4	2	2	0	9	2	+7	6
2	Varese	4	2	2	0	4	1	+3	6
3	Como	4	2	1	1	4	2	+2	5
4	Brescia	4	1	1	2	4	4	0	3
5	Reggina	4	0	0	4	2	14	−12	0

===== Matches =====
29 August 1971 1	Inter	6–0	Reggina	Milan
	Boninsegna 17', 56', 60', 84'; Bertini 21'; Jair 36'			Stadium: San Siro; Referee: Menegali

5 September 1971 2	Varese	1–1	Inter	Varese
	Borghi 59'		11' Ghio	Stadium: Franco Ossola; Referee: Michelotti

8 September 1971 3	Como	0–1	Inter	Como
			35' Boninsegna	Stadium: Giuseppe Sinigaglia; Referee: Branzoni

19 September 1971 5	Inter	1–1	Brescia	Milan
	Facchetti 59'		38' Tedoldi	Stadium: San Siro; Referee: Serafino

==== Second round ====
===== Group A =====
Pos	Team	Pld	W	D	L	GF	GA	GD	Pts	ACM	TOR	INT	JUV
1	Milan	6	4	2	0	7	3	+4	10	—	1–1	1–0	3–2
2	Torino	6	2	2	2	5	7	−2	6	0–0	—	1–0	2–1
3	Internazionale	6	2	0	4	7	6	+1	4	0–1	3–0	—	3–1
4	Juventus	6	2	0	4	8	11	−3	4	0–1	2–1	2–1	—

Source: historical-lineups.com

4 June 1972 1	Inter Milan	3–1	Juventus	Milan
	Boninsegna 16', 89'; Mazzola 72'		2' Anastasi	Stadium: San Siro; Referee: Giunti

8 June 1972 2	AC Milan	1–0	Inter Milan	Milan
	Sabadini 43'			Stadium: San Siro; Referee: Gonella

11 June 1972 3	Inter Milan	3–0	Torino	Milan
	Mazzola 40'; Corso 44'; Boninsegna 82'			Stadium: San Siro; Referee: Lattanzi

25 June 1972 4	Juventus	2–1	Inter Milan	Turin
	Novellini 47', 80'		88' Jair	Stadium: Comunale; Referee: Barbaresco

28 June 1972 5	Inter Milan	0–1	AC Milan	Milan
			28' Bigon	Stadium: San Siro; Referee: Bernardis

1 July 1972 6	Torino	1–0	Inter Milan	Turin
	Toschi 52' (pen.)			Stadium: Comunale; Referee: Monti

=== European Cup ===
==== Round of 32 ====
15 September 1971 1	Inter (Italy)	4–1	(Greece) AEK Athens	Milan
21:00 (CEST)	Mazzola 20'; Facchetti 35'; Jair 44'; Boninsegna 61' (pen.)		15' Pomonis	Stadium: San Siro; Attendance: 72,333; Referee: (Belgium) Loraux

29 September 1971 2	AEK Athens (Greece)	3–2 (4–6 agg.)	(Italy) Inter	Athens
21:00 (CEST)	Ventouris 29'; Papaiannou 45'; Nikolaidis 89'		17' (o.g.) Karafeskos; 75' Boninsegna	Stadium: Nikos Goumas Stadium; Attendance: 29,449; Referee: (Soviet Union) Bəhramov

==== Eightfinals ====
20 October 1971 1	Borussia Mönchengladbach (West Germany)	7–1	(Italy) Inter Milan	Mönchengladbach
	Heynckes 7', 44'; Le Fevre 21', 34'; Netzer 42', 52'; Sieloff 83' (pen.)		Boninsegna 20'	Stadium: Bökelbergstadion, Mönchengladbach; Attendance: 27,500; Referee: (Netherlands) Jef Dorpmans
Note: This game was annulled as Inter Forward Roberto Boninsegna was hit by a Coca-Cola can in the 29th minute. The first leg game was replayed after the game that was originally scheduled to be second leg was played, thus the order of legs was switched.

3 November 1971 2	Inter (Italy)	4–2	(West Germany) Borussia Mönchengladbach	Milan
21:15 CET	Bellugi 10'; Boninsegna 13'; Jair 57'; Ghio 90'		38' le Fevre; 89'’ Wittkamp	Stadium: San Siro; Attendance: 60 000; Referee: (Switzerland) Scheurer

1 December 1971 1 (replay)	Borussia Mönchengladbach (West Germany)	0–0	(Italy) Inter	Berlin
20:15 CET				Stadium: Olympiastadion; Attendance: 86 000; Referee: (England) Taylor

==== Quarterfinals ====
8 March 1972 1	Inter (Italy)	1–0	(Belgium) Standard Liège	Milan
21:15 CET	Jair 80'			Stadium: San Siro; Attendance: 54 000; Referee: (Socialist Federal Republic of Yugoslavia) Gugulovic

22 March 1972 2	Standard Liège (Belgium)	2–1	(Italy) Inter	Liege
22:00 CET	Cvetler 51'; Takač 84' (pen.)		80' Mazzola	Stadium: Stade Maurice Dufrasne; Attendance: 26 993; Referee: (France) Hauss

==== Semifinals ====
5 April 1972 1	Inter (Italy)	0–0	(Scotland) Celtic Glasgow	Milan
21:00 CEST				Stadium: San Siro; Attendance: 69 836; Referee: (Austria) Linemayr

19 April 1972 2	Celtic Glasgow (Scotland)	0–0 (a.e.t.) (4–5 p)	(Italy) Inter	Glasgow
21:00 CEST				Stadium: Celtic Park; Attendance: 75 124; Referee: (East Germany) Est Glöckner
	Penalties
	Deans (penalty missed) (blocked); Craig; Johnstone; McCluskey; Murdoch		Mazzola; Facchetti; Frustalupi; Pellizzaro; Jair
Note: During the shoot-out, teams had to take all five penalties even if they could no longer win (the shoot-out would otherwise have ended with a score of 5–3 as Inter went first).

==== Final ====
31 May 1972	Inter (Italy)	0–2	(Netherlands) Ajax	Rotterdam
20:30 CEST			Cruijff 47', 78'	Stadium: Feijenoord Stadion; Attendance: 61,354; Referee: (France) Héliès

== Statistics ==
=== Players statistics ===
No.	Pos	Nat	Player	Total		Serie A		Coppa		European Cup	
No.	Pos	Nat	Player	Apps	Goals	Apps	Goals	Apps	Goals	Apps	Goals
	GK	(Italy) ITA	Lido Vieri	16	-15	16	-15				
	DF	(Italy) ITA	Mauro Bellugi	20	0	20	0				
	DF	(Italy) ITA	Tarcisio Burgnich	27	0	27	0				
	DF	(Italy) ITA	Mario Giubertoni	27	1	27	1				
	DF	(Italy) ITA	Giacinto Facchetti	27	4	27	4				
	MF	(Italy) ITA	Gabriele Oriali	20	0	20	0				
	MF	(Italy) ITA	Gianfranco Bedin	26	3	26	3				
	MF	(Italy) ITA	Mario Bertini	24	4	23+1	4				
	MF	(Italy) ITA	Mario Corso	29	2	29	2				
	MF	(Italy) ITA	Sandro Mazzola	28	7	28	7				
	FW	(Italy) ITA	Roberto Boninsegna	28	22	28	22				
	GK	(Italy) ITA	Ivano Bordon	16	-13	14+2	-13				
	FW	(Brazil) BRA	Jair da Costa	17	1	17	1				
	FW	(Italy) ITA	Sergio Pellizzaro	15	2	11+4	2				
	MF	(Italy) ITA	Mario Frustalupi	20	1	9+11	1				
	FW	(Italy) ITA	Giampiero Ghio	9	1	6+3	1				
	DF	(Italy) ITA	Bernardino Fabbian	5	0	2+3	0				
	DF	(Italy) ITA	Graziano Bini	1	0	0+1	0				
	MF	(Italy) ITA	Evert Skoglund								
	FW	(Italy) ITA	Roberto Dioni								

- Source: http://calcio-seriea.net/presenze/1971/694/
