= 1970–71 Inter Milan season =

Football Club Internazionale Milano
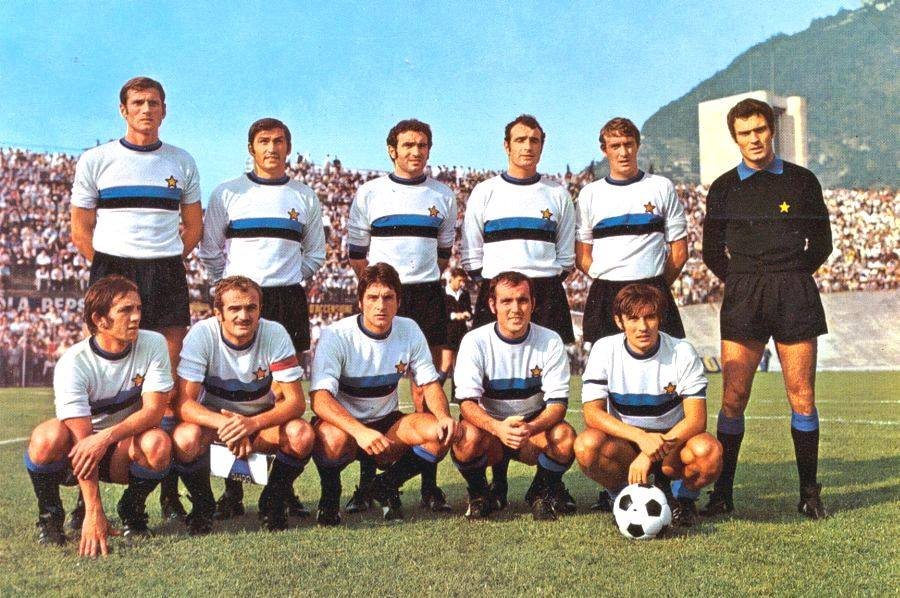
- Inter lining up prior to their Coppa Italia match versus Como on 30 August 1970.
- Chairman: Ivanoe Fraizzoli
- Manager: Heriberto Herrera (until 14 November); Giovanni Invernizzi
- Stadium: San Siro
- Serie A: 1st (in European Cup)
- Coppa Italia: First round
- Fairs Cup: First round
- Top goalscorer: League: Boninsegna (24); All: Boninsegna (26)
- Average home league attendance: 45,669
Home colours	Away colours

During 1970–71 season Inter competed in Serie A, Coppa Italia and Fairs' Cup.

== Summary ==
Following the golden era of the 1960s, Inter managed to win their eleventh league title in 1971. The second season of Heriberto Herrera is opened with the transfer out of Luis Suárez to Sampdoria, after nine years in Milan. The fans of Inter Milan were shocked with initial results, with Inter out in Coppa Italia and eliminated by Newcastle United in Fairs Cup.

President Ivanoe Fraizzoli, who at the time also made it clear that he was willing to sell the club if the right offer was tabled, fired Herrera after a 0–3 loss with city rivals Milan and handed control of the side to youth team boss Giovanni Invernizzi. A former Inter player, Invernizzi was initially appointed on a temporary basis yet ended the campaign by making Italian football history.

Invernizzi rejuvenated a tactically exhausted and an under-performing squad. He turned Tarcisio Burgnich into a sweeper, played the young Mauro Bellugi at right-back, reintegrated Jair into the team, replaced summer signing Mario Frustalupi with Mario Bertini and asked the club's senators – Giacinto Facchetti, Sandro Mazzola, Mario Corso and Boninsegna – to perform to their status.

The turning point in their season came after a defeat to Napoli in week 7. On the flight home, Invernizzi and some of the side's more experienced elements sat down with a fixture list to hand. Together they plotted their path to what many perceived as unlikely title glory and the tabella, as it was known, became part of Inter folklore.

Following defeat at the San Paolo, they went on an unbeaten run which saw them take 21 points from a possible 24. The Nerazzurri won the return derby, wiped out a significant point gap that winter champions Milan had over them and netted the championship with two games to spare. This is the first and only time in history that a Serie A team changed Coach mid-season and gone on to be crowned champions of Italy.

== Squad ==
Note: Flags indicate national team as defined under FIFA eligibility rules; some limited exceptions apply. Players may hold more than one non-FIFA nationality.

Pos.	Nation	Player
GK	ITA	Ivano Bordon
GK	ITA	Lido Vieri
DF	ITA	Mauro Bellugi
DF	ITA	Tarcisio Burgnich
DF	ITA	Giancarlo Cella
DF	ITA	Bernardino Fabbian
DF	ITA	Giacinto Facchetti
DF	ITA	Mario Giubertoni
DF	ITA	Spartaco Landini
DF	ITA	Oscar Righetti
MF	ITA	Marco Achilli

Pos.	Nation	Player
MF	ITA	Gianfranco Bedin
MF	ITA	Mario Bertini
MF	ITA	Mario Corso
MF	ITA	Mario Frustalupi
MF	ITA	Sandro Mazzola
MF	ITA	Gabriele Oriali
FW	ITA	Roberto Boninsegna
FW	BRA	Jair da Costa
FW	ITA	Sergio Pellizzaro
FW	ITA	Alberto Reif

== Transfers ==
In
Pos.	Name	from	Type
GK	Massimo Cacciatori	Cagliari	loan ended
GK	Luigi Reali	Voghera	loan ended
GK	Walter Zenga	Macallesi 1927	
DF	Bernardino Fabbian	Primavera	–
DF	Mario Giubertoni	Palermo	
DF	Mario Nadin	Primavera	–
DF	Oscar Righetti	SPAL	
MF	Marco Achilli	Monza	loan ended
MF	Mario Frustalupi	Sampdoria	loan ended
MF	Tiziano Manfrin	U.S. Azzurra	
MF	Gabriele Oriali	Primavera	–
MF	Luigi Plutino	Primavera	–
MF	Sergio Brunetta	Brescia	loan ended
FW	Sergio Pellizzaro	Palermo	
FW	Raffaele Pinton	primavera	–
FW	Massimo Silva	Monza	loan ended

Out
Pos.	Name	To	Type
GK	Sergio Girardi	Palermo	
GK	Luigi Reali	Savoia	loan
DF	Aristide Guarneri	Cremonese	
DF	Enzo Vecchiè	SPAL	
DF	Mario Nadin	VJS Velletri	loan
MF	Luigi Plutino	Anconitana	loan
MF	Luis Suarez	Sampdoria	
MF	Sandro Vanello	Palermo	
MF	Sergio Brunetta	Udinese	
FW	Raffaele Pinton	Potenza	
FW	Massimo Silva	Rovereto	loan

== Competitions ==
=== Serie A ===
==== League table ====
Pos	Team	Pld	W	D	L	GF	GA	GD	Pts	Qualification or relegation
1	Internazionale (C)	30	19	8	3	50	26	+24	46	Qualification to European Cup
2	Milan	30	15	12	3	54	26	+28	42	Qualification to UEFA Cup
3	Napoli	30	15	9	6	33	19	+14	39	Qualification to UEFA Cup
4	Juventus	30	11	13	6	41	30	+11	35	Qualification to UEFA Cup
5	Bologna	30	10	14	6	30	24	+6	34	Qualification to UEFA Cup

Source: Panini
(C) Champions

==== Matches ====
27 September 1970 1	Hellas Verona	1–2	Inter Milan	Verona
	Sirena 72'	Report	52', 73' Boninsegna	Stadium: Stadio Marcantonio Bentegodi; Referee: Concetto Lo Bello

4 October 1970 2	Inter Milan	0–0	Roma	Milan
		Report		Stadium: Stadio San Siro; Referee: Fabio Monti

11 October 1970 3	Bologna	2–2	Inter Milan	Bologna
	Savoldi 26', 76'	Report	49' Facchetti; 71' Frustalupi	Stadium: Stadio Renato Dall'Ara; Referee: Sergio Gonella

25 October 1970 4	Inter Milan	1–3	Cagliari	Milan
	Mazzola 88'	Report	7', 21' Riva; 79' Domenghini	Stadium: San Siro; Referee: Concetto Lo Bello

8 November 1970 5	AC Milan	3–0	Inter Milan	Milan
	Biasiolo 51'; Villa 69'; Rivera 88'	Report		Stadium: San Siro; Referee: Sergio Gonella

15 November 1970 6	Inter Milan	2–0	Torino	Milan
	Boninsegna 50' (pen.), 67'	Report		Stadium: San Siro; Referee: Aurelio Angonese

22 November 1970 7	Napoli	2–1	Inter Milan	Naples
	Pogliana 70'; Ghio 75'	Report	50' Jair	Stadium: Stadio San Paolo; Referee: Monti

29 November 1970 8	Inter Milan	3–2	Catania	Milan
	Boninsegna 2', 61'; Achilli 59'	Report	31' Bernardis; 90' Bonfanti	Stadium: San Siro; Referee: Antonio Trono

13 December 1970 9	Lanerossi	1–2	Inter Milan	Vicenza
	Santin 72'	Report	66' Jair; 73' Boninsegna	Stadium: Stadio Romeo Menti; Referee: Fulvio Pieroni

21 December 1970 10	Inter Milan	3–2	Varese	Milan
13:30	Boninsegna 9', 63'; Facchetti 37'	Report	76', 90' Carelli	Stadium: San Siro; Referee: Enzo Barbaresco

27 December 1970 11	Inter Milan	2–0	Juventus	Milan
	Corso 10'; Boninsegna 67'	Report		Stadium: San Siro; Referee: Paolo Toselli

3 January 1971 12	Sampdoria	0–2	Inter Milan	Genoa
		Report	86' Mazzola; 89' Bertini	Stadium: Stadio Luigi Ferraris; Referee: Riccardo Lattanzi

10 January 1971 13	Foggia	1–1	Inter Milan	Foggia
	Bigon 34'	Report	23' Boninsegna	Stadium: Stadio Pino Zaccheria; Referee: Lo Bello

17 January 1971 14	Inter Milan	2–1	Fiorentina	Milan
	Boninsegna 35', 63' (pen.)	Report	75' (pen.) Chiarugi	Stadium: San Siro

24 January 1971 15	Lazio	0–1	Inter Milan	Rome
		Report	43' Boninsegna	Stadium: Stadio Olimpico; Referee: Aurelio Angonese

31 January 1971 16	Inter Milan	1–0	Hellas Verona	Milan
	Facchetti 48'	Report		Stadium: San Siro; Referee: Enzo Barbaresco

7 February 1971 17	Roma	0–0	Inter Milan	Rome
		Report		Stadium: Stadio Olimpico; Referee: Concetto Lo Bello

14 February 1971 18	Inter Milan	1–0	Bologna	Stadio San Siro
	Boninsegna 60'	Report		Referee: Angonese

28 February 1971 19	Cagliari	0–0	Inter Milan	Cagliari
		Report		Stadium: Stadio Sant'Elia; Referee: Antonio Sbardella

7 March 1971 20	Inter Milan	2–0	Milan	Milan
	Corso 12'; Mazzola 32'	Report		Stadium: San Siro; Referee: Concetto Lo Bello

14 March 1971 21	Torino	0–2	Inter Milan	Bergamo
		Report	19' Boninsegna; 70' Facchetti	Stadium: Mario Brumana; Referee: Francesco Francescon

21 March 1971 22	Inter Milan	2–1	Napoli	Milan
	Boninsegna 55' (pen.), 58'	Report	40' Altafini	Stadium: San Siro; Referee: Sergio Gonella

28 March 1971 23	Catania	0–1	Inter Milan	Catania
		Report	84' (pen.) Bernardis	Stadium: Cibali; Referee: Aurelio Angonese

4 April 1971 24	Inter Milan	2–1	Lanerossi	Milan
	Corso 46'; Boninsegna 67' (pen.)	Report	71' (pen.) Maraschi	Stadium: San Siro; Referee: Antonio Trono

11 April 1971 25	Varese	1–3	Inter Milan	Stadio Franco Ossola
	Nuti 49'	Report	23', 25' Boninsegna; 47' Jair	Referee: Paolo Toselli

18 April 1971 26	Juventus	1–1	Inter Milan	Turin
	Marchetti 31'	Report	79' Bedin	Stadium: Comunale; Referee: Concetto Lo Bello

25 April 1971 27	Inter Milan	3–1	Sampdoria	Milan
	Mazzola 46'; Boninsegna 65' (pen.), 80' (pen.)	Report	85' (pen.) Suárez	Stadium: San Siro; Referee: Enzo Barbaresco

2 May 1971 28	Inter Milan	5–0	Foggia	Milan
	Boninsegna 7'; Jair 54', 90'; Facchetti 62'; Mazzola 69'	Report		Stadium: San Siro; Referee: Antonio Sbardella

16 May 1971 29	Fiorentina	2–2	Inter Milan	Florence
	Mariani 20'; Brizi 90'	Report	74' Jair; 78' Mazzola	Stadium: Stadio Artemio Franchi; Referee: Aurelio Angonese

23 May 1971 30	Inter Milan	1–1	Lazio	Milan
	Mazzola 89'	Report	24' Franco Nanni	Stadium: San Siro; Referee: Cesare Trinchieri

=== Coppa Italia ===
==== Group 3 ====
Pos	Team	Pld	W	D	L	GF	GA	GD	Pts
1	Monza	3	1	2	0	4	3	+1	4
2	Atalanta	3	1	2	0	3	2	+1	4
3	Inter Milan	3	1	1	1	6	3	+3	3
4	Como	3	0	1	2	1	6	−5	1

30 August 1970 1	Como	0–4	Inter Milan	Como
			10' Pellizzaro; 48' Mazzola; 61' Boninsegna; 76' Frustalupi	Stadium: Stadio Giuseppe Sinigaglia; Referee: Cesare Trinchieri

6 September 1970 2	Inter Milan	1–2	Atalanta	Milan
	Mazzola 49'		60' Vallongo; 66' (pen.) Bosdaves	Stadium: San Siro; Referee: Francesco Panzino

13 September 1970 3	Monza	1–1	Inter Milan	Monza
	Bertogna 46'		19' Boninsegna	Stadium: Stadio Gino Alfonso Sada; Referee: Michelotti

=== Fairs Cup ===
==== First round ====
23 September 1970	Inter Milan	1–1	(England) Newcastle United	San Siro
	Cella 85'		43' W. Davies	Referee: (Germany) Heinz Siebert

30 September 1970	(England) Newcastle United	2–0	Inter Milan	Newcastle upon Tyne
	Moncur 28'; W. Davies 70'			Stadium: St James' Park; Referee: (Belgium) Minnoy

== Statistics ==
Competition	Points	Home						Away						Total						DR
Competition	Points	G	W	D	L	Gs	Ga	G	W	D	L	Gs	Ga	G	W	D	L	Gs	Ga	DR
Serie A	46	15	12	2	1	30	12	15	7	6	2	20	14	30	19	8	3	50	26	24
Coppa Italia	–	1	0	0	1	1	2	2	1	1	0	5	1	3	1	1	1	6	3	3
Fairs Cup	–	1	0	1	0	1	1	1	0	0	1	0	2	2	0	1	1	1	3	−2
Total	–	17	12	3	2	32	15	18	8	7	2	25	15	35	20	10	5	57	32	25

== See also ==
- "Serie A 1970–71". RSSSF.
- "Archivio storico della La Stampa". La Stampa.
- "Archivio storico dell'Unità". L'Unita. Archived from the original on 2013-12-02.
