= 1972 European Cup final =

- Match programme cover
- Event: 1971–72 European Cup
Inter Milan	Ajax
(Italy)	(Netherlands)
0	2
- Date: 31 May 1972
- Venue: De Kuip, Rotterdam
- Man of the Match: Johan Cruyff
- Referee: Robert Héliès (France)
- Attendance: 61,354

The 1972 European Cup final was a football match held at De Kuip, Rotterdam, on 31 May 1972, that was contested between Internazionale of Italy and AFC Ajax of the Netherlands to determine the champions of the 1971–72 European Cup. Ajax defeated Inter by a score of 2–0 to claim their second successive European Cup victory, following their triumph in the 1971 final. Two second-half goals from forward Johan Cruyff provided the margin of victory for the Dutch side.

This game has been cited as Total Football's greatest moment. Ajax dominated much of the game as Inter defended desperately with their catenaccio strategy.

== Route to the final ==
Inter Milan				Round	Ajax			
Opponent	Agg.	1st leg	2nd leg		Opponent	Agg.	1st leg	2nd leg
(Greece) AEK Athens	6–4	4–1 (H)	2–3 (A)	First round	(East Germany) Dynamo Dresden	2–0	2–0 (H)	0–0 (A)
(West Germany) Borussia Mönchengladbach	4–2	4–2 (H)	0–0 (A)	Second round	(France) Olympique de Marseille	6–2	2–1 (A)	4–1 (H)
(Belgium) Standard Liège	2–2 (a)	1–0 (H)	1–2 (A)	Quarter-finals	(England) Arsenal	3–1	2–1 (H)	1–0 (A)
(Scotland) Celtic	0–0 (5–4 p)	0–0 (H)	0–0 (a.e.t.) (A)	Semi-finals	(Portugal) Benfica	1–0	1–0 (H)	0–0 (A)

== Match ==
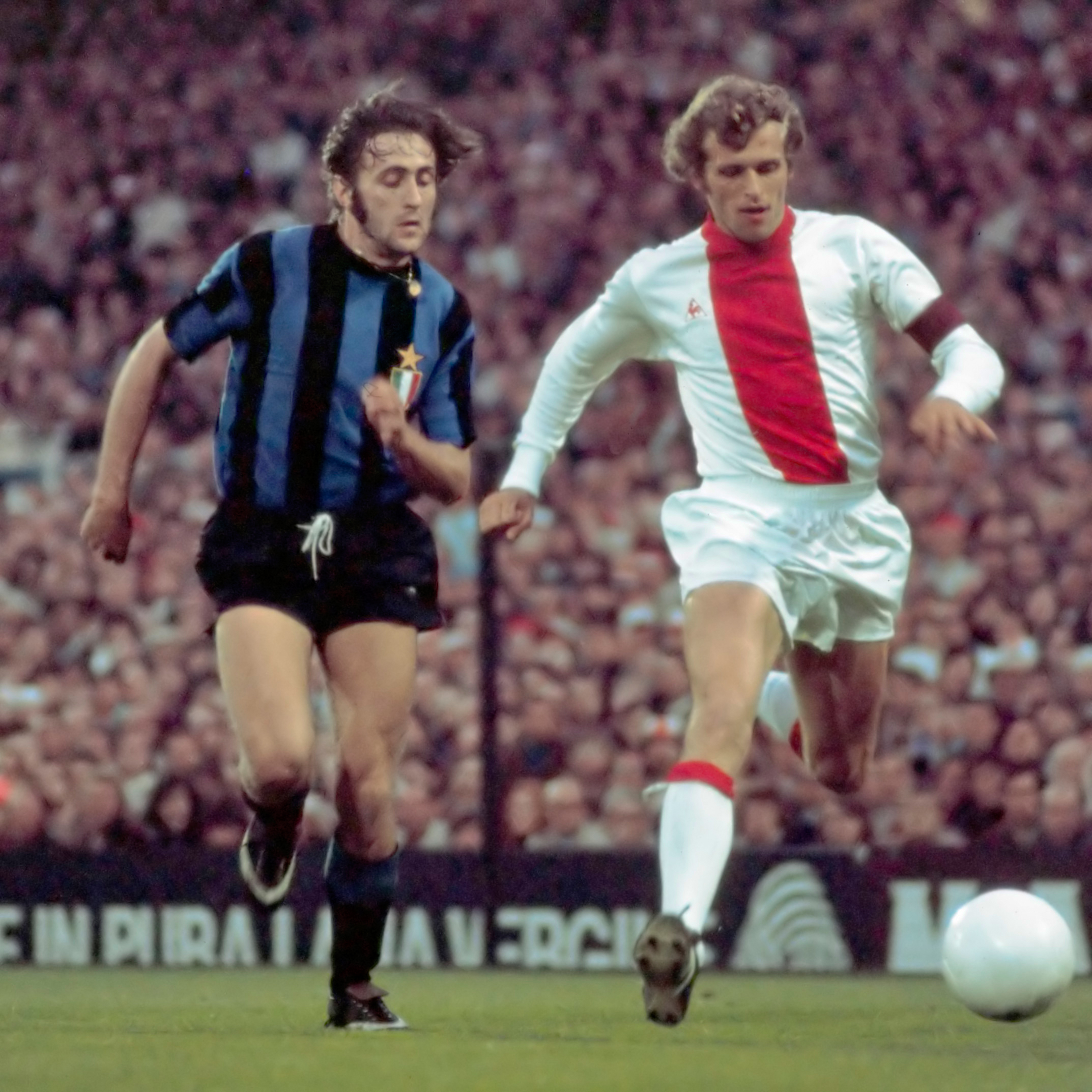
Mauro Bellugi and Piet Keizer

=== Details ===
31 May 1972

Inter Milan (Italy)	0–2	(Netherlands) Ajax
	Report	Cruyff 47', 78'

De Kuip, Rotterdam
Attendance: 61,354
Referee: Robert Héliès (France)

Inter Milan	Ajax

GK	1	(Italy) Ivano Bordon
RB	2	(Italy) Mauro Bellugi
LB	3	(Italy) Giacinto Facchetti
DM	4	(Italy) Gabriele Oriali
CB	5	(Italy) Mario Giubertoni	(substituted off) 12'
SW	6	(Italy) Tarcisio Burgnich
RW	7	(Brazil) Jair da Costa	(substituted off) 56'
CM	8	(Italy) Gianfranco Bedin
CF	9	(Italy) Roberto Boninsegna
CM	10	(Italy) Sandro Mazzola (c)
LF	11	(Italy) Mario Frustalupi
Substitutions:
MF	14	(Italy) Mario Bertini	(substituted on) 12'
MF	16	(Italy) Sergio Pellizzaro	(substituted on) 56'
Manager:
(Italy) Giovanni Invernizzi

GK	1	(Netherlands) Heinz Stuy
RB	3	(Netherlands) Wim Suurbier
CB	4	(Netherlands) Barry Hulshoff
CB	12	(West Germany) Horst Blankenburg
LB	5	(Netherlands) Ruud Krol
CM	7	(Netherlands) Johan Neeskens
CM	15	(Netherlands) Arie Haan
CM	9	(Netherlands) Gerrie Mühren
RW	8	(Netherlands) Sjaak Swart
CF	14	(Netherlands) Johan Cruyff
LW	11	(Netherlands) Piet Keizer (c)
Manager:
(Romania) Ștefan Kovács

== See also ==
- 1971–72 AFC Ajax season
- 1971–72 Inter Milan season
- 1972 European Cup Winners' Cup final
- 1972 European Super Cup
- 1972 UEFA Cup final
- AFC Ajax in international football
- Inter Milan in international football
