= 1971 Ballon d'Or =

Annual association football award event in France

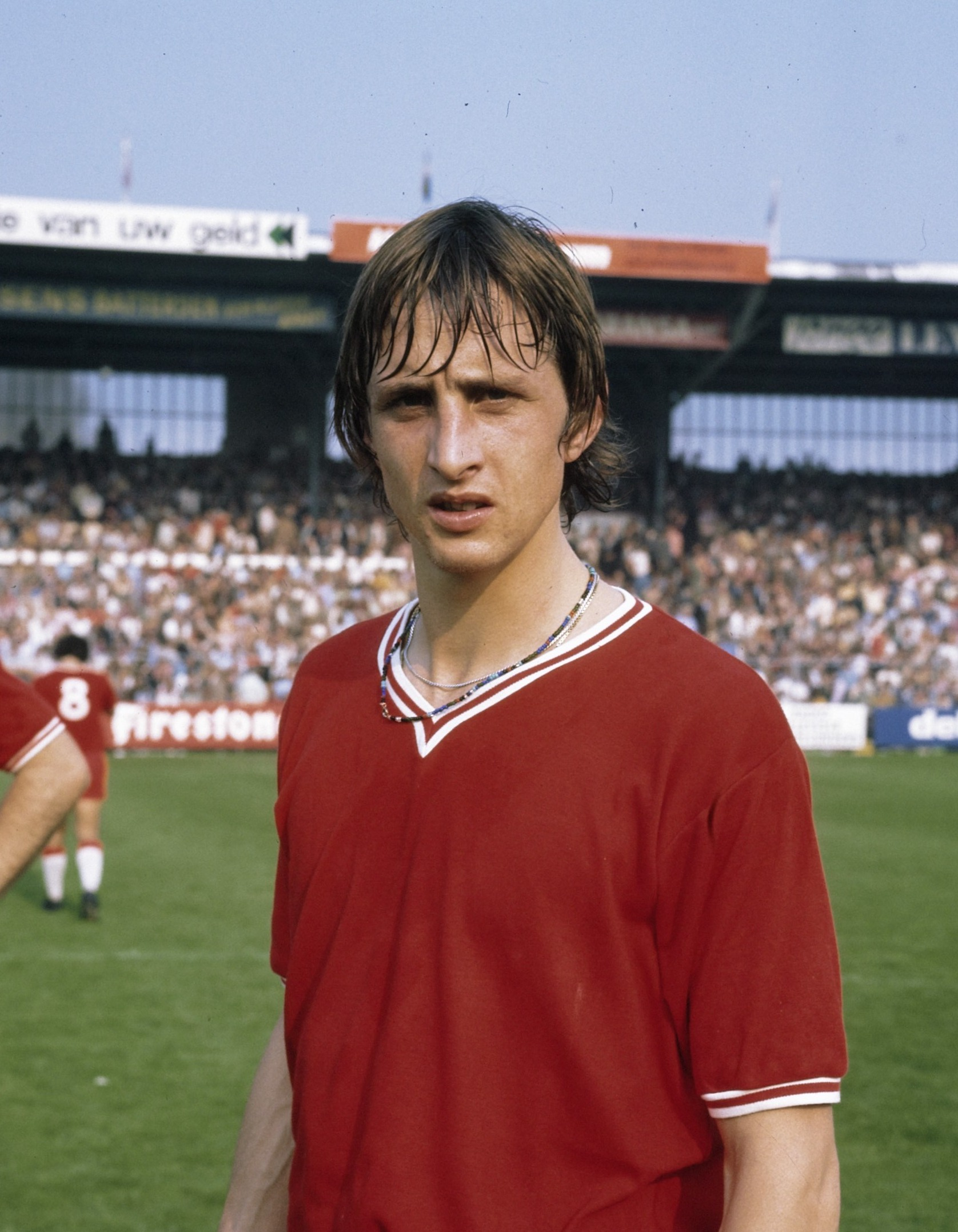
- 1971 Ballon d'Or winner, Johan Cruyff
- Date: 28 December 1971
- Location: Paris, France
- Presented by: France Football

Highlights
- Won by: (Netherlands) Johan Cruyff (1st award)
- Website: ballondor.com

The 1971 Ballon d'Or, given to the best football player in Europe as judged by a panel of sports journalists from UEFA member countries, was awarded to Johan Cruyff on 28 December 1971.

Cruyff was the first Dutch national to win the award, and also the first Ajax player to win the trophy.

== Rankings ==
Rank	Player	Club(s)	Nationality	Points
1	Johan Cruyff	(Netherlands) Ajax	Netherlands	116
2	Sandro Mazzola	(Italy) Internazionale	Italy	57
3	George Best	(England) Manchester United	Northern Ireland	56
4	Günter Netzer	(West Germany) Borussia Mönchengladbach	West Germany	30
5	Franz Beckenbauer	(West Germany) Bayern Munich	West Germany	27
6	Gerd Müller	(West Germany) Bayern Munich	West Germany	18
6	Josip Skoblar	(France) Marseille	Yugoslavia	18
8	Martin Chivers (Note: France Football reports Chivers with 13 points.)	(England) Tottenham Hotspur	England	12
9	Piet Keizer	(Netherlands) Ajax	Netherlands	9
10	Bobby Moore	(England) West Ham United	England	7
10	Ferenc Bene	(Hungary) Újpest	Hungary	7
12	Yevhen Rudakov	(Soviet Union) Dynamo Kyiv	Soviet Union	6
13	Giacinto Facchetti	(Italy) Internazionale	Italy	4
13	Mimis Domazos	(Greece) Panathinaikos	Greece	4
15	Pirri	(Spain) Real Madrid	Spain	3
15	Dragan Džajić	(Socialist Federal Republic of Yugoslavia) Red Star Belgrade	Yugoslavia	3
15	Berti Vogts	(West Germany) Borussia Mönchengladbach	West Germany	3
18	Terry Cooper	(England) Leeds United	England	2
18	Francis Lee	(England) Manchester City	England	2
18	Wolfgang Overath	(West Germany) 1. FC Köln	West Germany	2
18	Wilfried Van Moer	(Belgium) Standard Liège	Belgium	2
22	Bobby Charlton	(England) Manchester United	England	1
22	Albert Shesternyov	(Soviet Union) CSKA Moscow	Soviet Union	1
