= Lido Vieri =

Italian footballer and manager

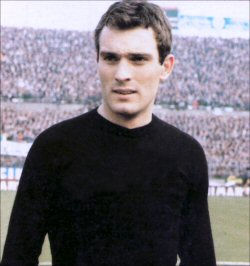
- Vieri c. 1970

Personal information
- Date of birth: 16 July 1939 (age 87)
- Place of birth: Piombino, Italy
- Height: 1.83 m (6 ft 0 in)
- Position: Goalkeeper

Youth career
- 1954–1957: Torino

Senior career*
Years	Team	Apps	(Gls)
1957–1969	Torino	275	(0)
1957–1958	→ Vigevano (loan)	31	(0)
1969–1976	Inter Milan	140	(0)
1976–1980	Pistoiese	63	(0)
Total		499	(0)

International career
1963–1968	Italy	4	(0)

Managerial career
- 1980–1981: Pistoiese
- 1981–1982: Siracusa
- 1982–1983: Massese
- 1983–1986: Juve Stabia
- 1986–1987: Massese
- 1987–1988: Carrarese
- 1988–1989: Juve Stabia
- 1994–1995: Torino
- 1995–1996: Torino
- 1996–1997: Torino
Medal record
Men's football
Representing Italy (as player)
UEFA European Championship
Winner	1968 Italy
FIFA World Cup
Runner-up	1970 Mexico
- * Club domestic league appearances and goals

Lido Vieri (Italian pronunciation: [ˈliːdo ˈvjɛːri]; born 16 July 1939) is an Italian former football player and manager who played as a goalkeeper. He won the 1968 European Championship and was a runner-up at the 1970 FIFA World Cup with the Italy national team.

== Club career ==
During his club career, he played for Torino, Inter and Pistoiese. Vieri won the Coppa Italia with Torino during the 1967–68 season, and the 1970–71 Serie A with Inter.

== International career ==
Vieri earned four caps for the Italy national team between 1963 and 1968. He was a backup keeper to Dino Zoff and Albertosi in Italy's victorious 1968 UEFA European Football Championship campaign on home soil under manager Ferruccio Valcareggi, and also at the 1970 FIFA World Cup, where Italy reached the final.

== Style of play ==
Considered one of the best Italian goalkeepers of his generation thanks to his physicality and consistency, Vieri won the "Premio Combi" during the 1962–63 season, a title awarded to the best goalkeeper in Serie A. Throughout his career, he was often perceived as an aggressive, vocal, and commanding goalkeeper, gaining a degree of infamy for his temperament. Vieri was an elegant, courageous, and acrobatic shot-stopper, who was known in particular for his athleticism, spectacular saves, bravery, and ability to rush quickly off his line to collect the ball, as well as his command of the area, leadership, and handling of crosses.

== Honours ==
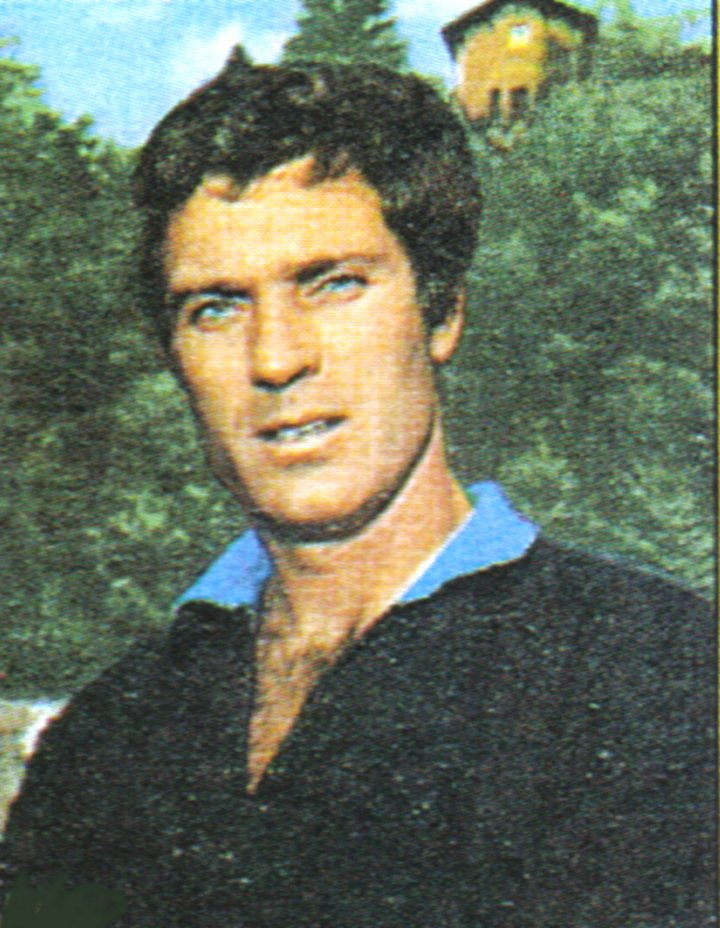
Lido Vieri

Torino

- Coppa Italia: 1967–68

Inter Milan

- Serie A: 1970–71

Italy

- FIFA World Cup runner-up: 1970
- UEFA European Football Championship: 1968
