= Oscar Righetti =

Italian footballer (born 1948)

Personal information
- Date of birth: 17 September 1948 (age 78)
- Place of birth: Peschiera del Garda, Italy
- Height: 1.75 m (5 ft 9 in)
- Position: Defender

Senior career*
Years	Team	Apps	(Gls)
1967–1970	SPAL	38	(1)
1970–1971	Internazionale	1	(0)
1971–1972	Piacenza	28	(2)
1972–1973	Crotone	11	(?)
1973–1974	Piacenza	26	(1)
1974–1975	Casertana	20	(2)
1975–1978	Suzzara		
- * Club domestic league appearances and goals

Oscar Righetti (born 17 September 1948 in Peschiera del Garda) is a retired Italian professional footballer who played as a defender.

== Honours ==
Inter

- Serie A champion: 1970–71.
