= Sandro Mazzola =

Italian footballer (1942–2026)

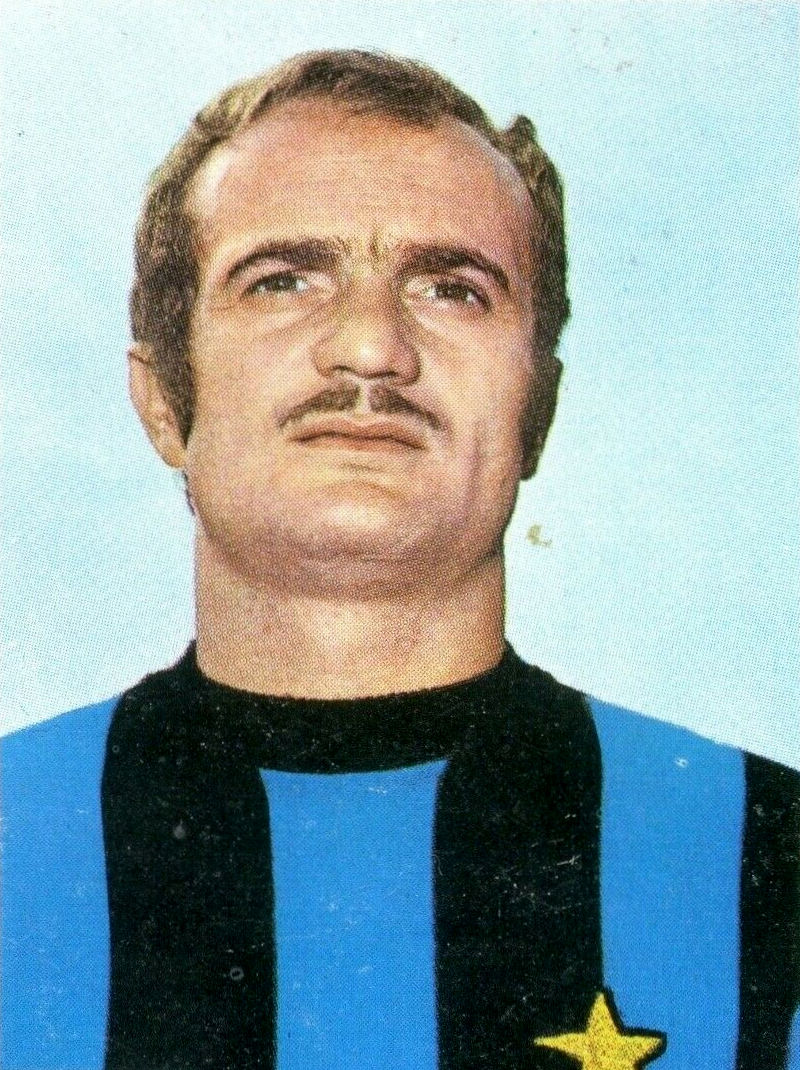
- Mazzola with Inter Milan in 1971

Personal information
- Full name: Alessandro Mazzola
- Date of birth: 8 November 1942
- Place of birth: Turin, Piedmont, Kingdom of Italy
- Date of death: 19 September 2026 (aged 83)
- Place of death: Vedano al Lambro, Lombardy, Italy
- Positions: Forward; attacking midfielder

Senior career*
Years	Team	Apps	(Gls)
1960–1977	Inter Milan	417	(116)

International career
1963–1974	Italy	70	(22)
Medal record
Representing Italy
UEFA European Championship
Winner	1968 Italy
FIFA World Cup
Runner-up	1970 Mexico
- * Club domestic league appearances and goals

Alessandro Mazzola (Italian pronunciation: [ˈsandro matˈtsɔːla]; 8 November 1942 – 19 September 2026) was an Italian professional footballer who played as a forward or attacking midfielder for Inter Milan and the Italy national team. He also worked as a football analyst and commentator on the Italian national television station RAI.

Mazzola is widely regarded as one of the greatest Italian football players of all time, and as one of the best players of his generation, due to his speed, work-rate, creativity, technical skills and eye for goal; he placed second in the 1971 Ballon d'Or. Having spent his entire 17-season career with Inter, he holds the honour of being a one-club man. With the club, he won four Serie A titles (1963, 1965, 1966 and 1971), two European Cups (1964 and 1965) and two Intercontinental Cups (1964 and 1965), also winning the Serie A top scorer award during the 1964–65 season, in which he also reached the Coppa Italia final, narrowly missing out on a treble with the club. With the Italy national side, Mazzola won the UEFA European Championship in 1968, being named to the Team of the Tournament, and reached the final of the 1970 FIFA World Cup; he also took part in the 1966 and 1974 FIFA World Cups with Italy.

Mazzola was the son of Italian footballer Valentino Mazzola, player of the Grande Torino who died in the Superga air disaster. Sandro Mazzola's younger brother, Ferruccio, was also a footballer, who died in 2013.

== Early life ==
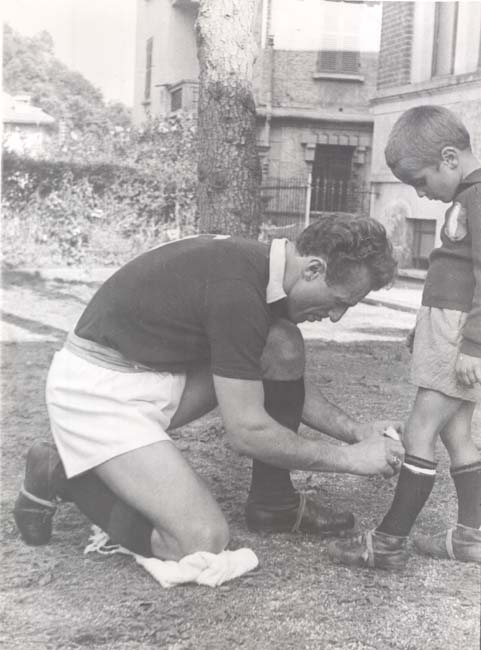
Sandro Mazzola in 1949 with his father Valentino

Sandro Mazzola was born in Turin on 8 November 1942, a few weeks after his father, Valentino Mazzola, joined Torino from Venezia. His younger brother, Ferruccio, who was named after the club president of Torino Ferruccio Novo, was born two years later. Their parents separated in 1946, but their father gained custody of Sandro, who was six years old when his father died in the Superga air disaster in 1949. The two brothers then moved with their mother and her second husband Piero to Cassano d'Adda, east of Milan.

== Club career ==
While their father, Valentino, had played for Torino F.C., Sandro Mazzola and his brother Ferruccio signed for Inter Milan. Unlike his younger brother, Sandro Mazzola spent his entire career with Inter, scoring 116 Serie A goals for the club in 417 league appearances. He made his Serie A debut under manager Helenio Herrera during the 1960–61 season, along with many other youngsters, against rivals Juventus on 10 June 1961, scoring his team's only goal from a penalty in a 9–1 loss; this was his only appearance of the season. Herrera had joined Inter from Spanish side Barcelona for the 1960–61 season. Luis Suárez, who had previously played under Herrera at Barcelona, joined Inter in 1961 and became the team's principal playmaker during the 1960s.

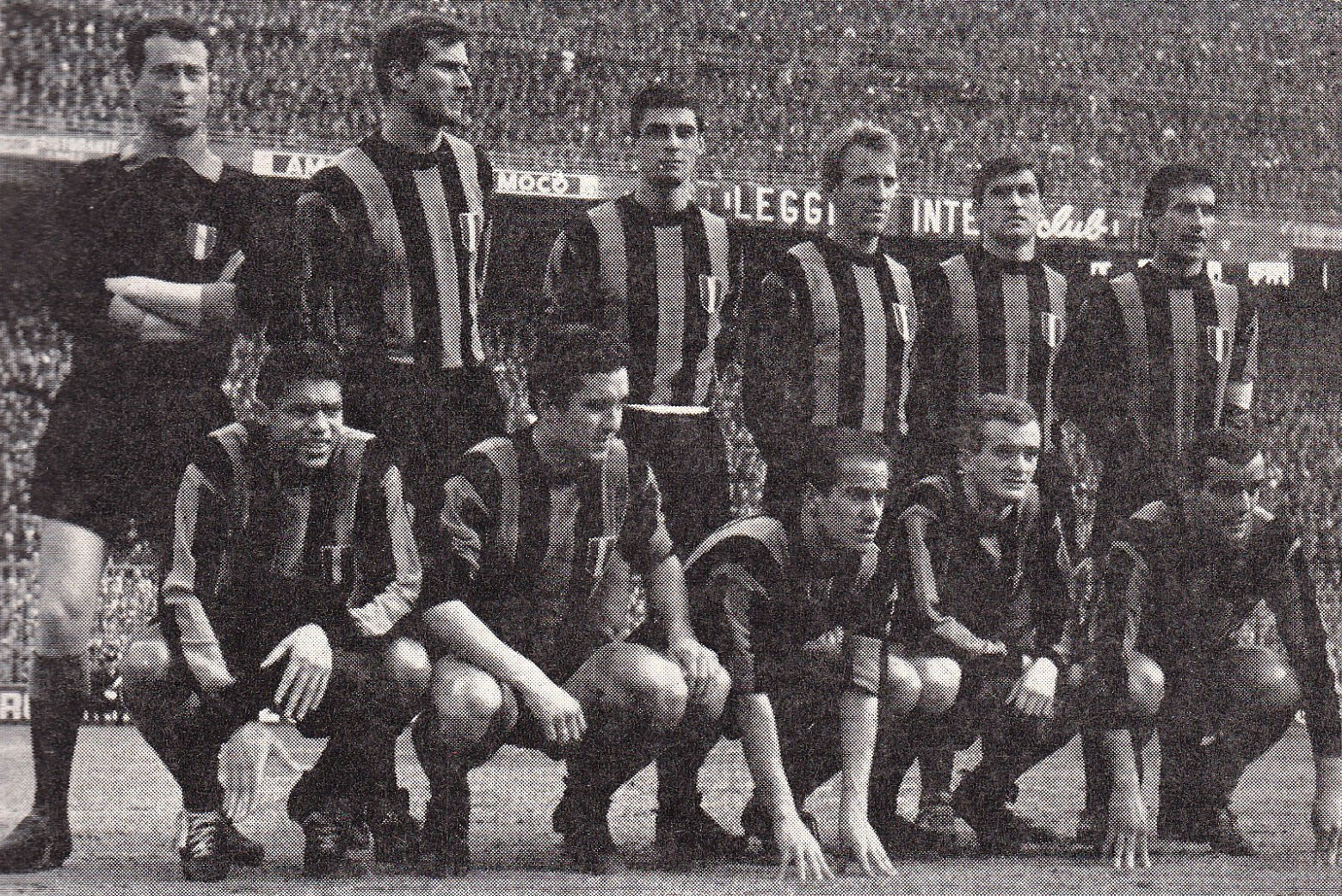
Mazzola (crouched, second from the right) with Grande Inter in the 1963–64 season

Herrera's Inter side during that period also featured Tarcisio Burgnich and Giacinto Facchetti as his fullbacks, Brazilian Jair as his winger, Mario Corso as the left midfielder, Armando Picchi as his sweeper, and Mazzola, who eventually played in the inside-right offensive position under Herrera. Together, they transformed the club into the best team in Italy, Europe, and the world during the 60s, which came to be known as Grande Inter. They were known for their infamous defensive "catenaccio" tactics and ability to score from swift and sudden counterattacks. Mazzola won four Serie A titles with Inter, including two consecutive titles in 1965 and 1966, finishing as the league's top scorer in the former season, with 17 goals.

In 1964, Mazzola scored twice to help Inter defeat Real Madrid in the 1964 European Cup Final to help the club emulate cross-city rival A.C. Milan's feat of the previous season; he finished the tournament as the joint top scorer with seven goals. Inter defended their European title the following season by beating Benfica in the Final. Inter were eliminated in the semi-finals of the European Cup during the 1965–66 season by eventual champions Real Madrid, while in the 1966–67 season, Inter reached their third European Cup Final, but lost 2–1 to Celtic despite Mazzola scoring the opening goal of the match from the penalty spot in the seventh minute. Mazzola also won two consecutive Intercontinental Cups with Inter in 1964 and 1965, and reached the 1964–65 Coppa Italia final, as well as managing a third-place finish in the 1967–68 Coppa Italia; he reached yet another European Cup final with Inter in 1972, only to lose 2–0 to Ajax.

In 1971, following his final Serie A title and his performances in Europe, he placed second in the Ballon d'Or, behind Johan Cruyff. This was the closest he ever came to winning the award, and the first time he was shortlisted as a finalist.

I played against your father. You did him proud, and I want to give you my shirt.

— Real Madrid legend Ferenc Puskás speaking with Sandro Mazzola after Inter defeated Real Madrid in the 1964 European Cup Final.

Mazzola retired from professional football in the summer of 1977, having served as Inter's captain from 1970 until his retirement. By the end of his career, he had won four Serie A titles (1963, 1965, 1966 and 1971), two European Cups (1964 and 1965), two Intercontinental Cups (1964 and 1965), one European Championship (1968) and was top scorer during the 1964–65 Serie A season. He was also Inter's all-time top scorer in the European Cup/Champions League until Lautaro Martinez surpassed his record on 5 March 2025.

== International career ==
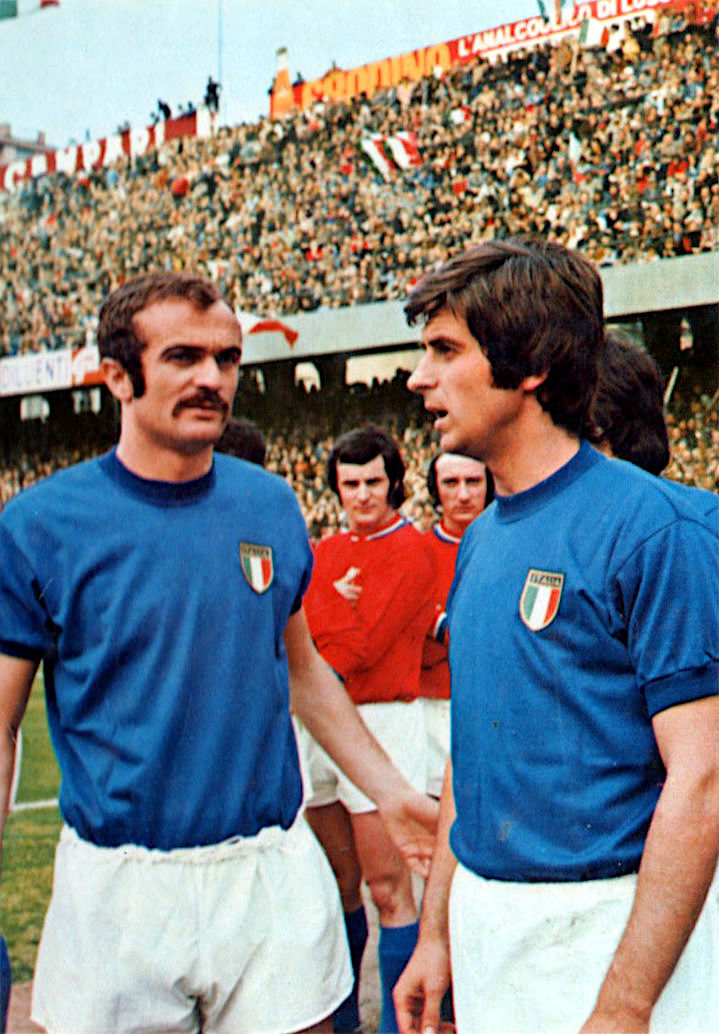
Mazzola playing for Italy alongside Gianni Rivera; the two players were involved in manager Ferruccio Valcareggi's infamous staffetta policy at the 1970 World Cup.

Mazzola played 70 times for Italy between 1963 and 1974, scoring 22 goals. His debut for the national side was against Brazil on 12 May 1963, when he was aged only 20, and he marked the occasion by scoring a goal from a penalty. Mazzola later played for his country at the 1966 FIFA World Cup under Edmondo Fabbri, appearing in all three of Italy's group matches, and scoring in his nation's opening fixture, a 2–0 win over Chile, as Italy were eliminated in the first round; he later took part at the next two editions of the tournament with Italy. His biggest achievement with the national side came in 1968, however, when Italy won the 1968 European Championship on home soil under manager Ferruccio Valcareggi, and Mazzola was named as a member of the Team of the Tournament for his performance.

Two years later, however, although Italy arrived at the World Cup in Mexico as defending European champions, there was much turmoil within the team, as the Italian national team's coach, Valcareggi, believed that Mazzola could not play alongside the other Italian creative star player Gianni Rivera, who played in a similar position for Mazzola's rival club Milan, as it would offset the balance within the team; Mazzola was therefore chosen to start in all three of Italy's first round matches, due to his superior athleticism and work-rate. As the Italians had difficulty scoring during the group stage, and Mazzola had struggled to regain match fitness after coming down with a stomach flu, Valcareggi devised a controversial solution for the second round of the tournament, which he called the "staffetta" (relay), in order to play both players.

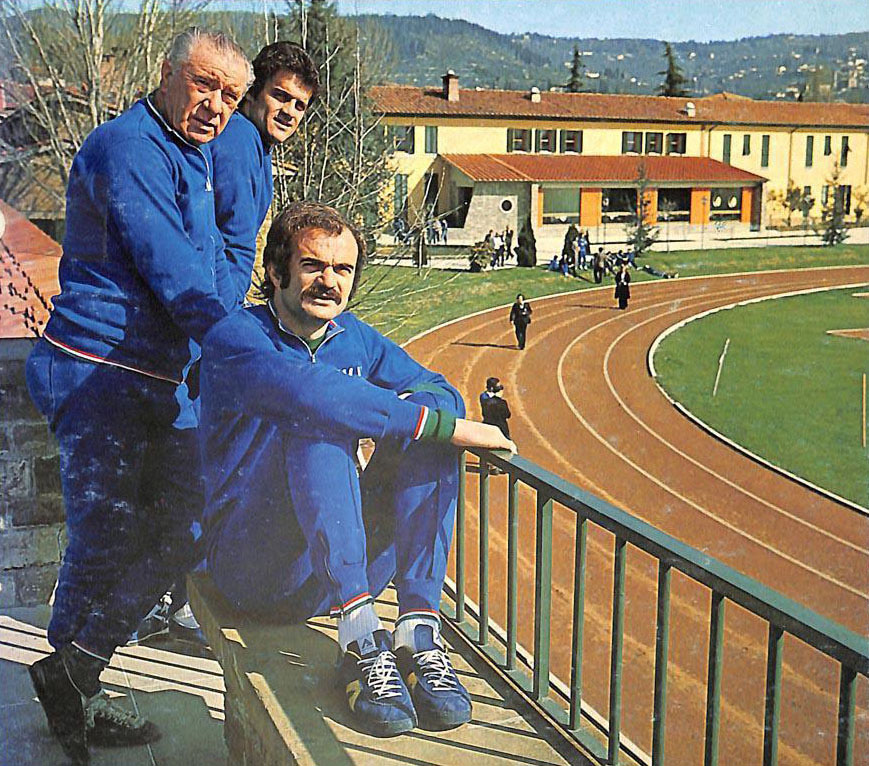
Mazzola relaxing with Azzurri in 1974 alongside manager Valcareggi and teammate Capello

Mazzola, who was faster, stronger, fitter, more goal-prone, and who had the superior tactical intelligence and work-rate of the two, would start in the first half, while Rivera would come in at half time, once the opposing players began to tire. This would allow the more creative playmaker, Rivera, more time on the ball to dictate the tempo of the team's play. With this strategy, Italy defeated hosts Mexico in the quarter-finals, and subsequently West Germany in extra time in the semi-finals to reach the World Cup final for the first time in 32 years, in which Italy faced Brazil, led by Pelé. The match was billed as the battle between offensive and defensive football, but on game day, Valcareggi abandoned his staffetta policy at half time, with the score tied at 1–1, and decided to only use Mazzola until the very end of the match, due to the precarious physical state of several of his starting players following Italy's taxing semi-final victory. Rivera finally went into the game with only six minutes remaining, replacing Roberto Boninsegna, with Brazil leading 3–1. Two of Italy's biggest technical stars were finally united on the pitch, where many people believed they should have been all along, but it was too late; Brazil won the match 4–1 to capture the World Cup title, their third overall.

Four years later, Valcareggi finally used the two players together at the 1974 World Cup, but the ageing Italian side underperformed and was eliminated in the first round of the tournament.

== Retirement and death ==
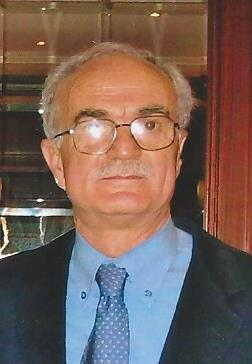
Mazzola in 2008

After retiring from football, Mazzola held an executive position at Inter, between 1977 and 1984, then at Genoa. From 1995 to 1999, he returned to work at Inter as sporting director, before being replaced by former player and teammate Gabriele Oriali. From 2000 to 2003, he worked as the sporting director of Torino.

Mazzola also worked as a commentator for Rai Sport. He holds the unique record of being the commentator of the finals of the 1982 World Cup alongside Luigi Colombo for Telemontecarlo (the first final broadcast on commercial television) and the 2006 World Cup final alongside Marco Civoli for RAI, both won by Italy.

Mazzola died in Vedano al Lambro, where he had resided since the 1970s, in the early minutes of 19 September 2026, following a long illness; he was 83. His death was first announced by Inter. Mazzola's funeral was held at the Basilica of Sant'Ambrogio in Milan on 21 September.

== Style of play ==
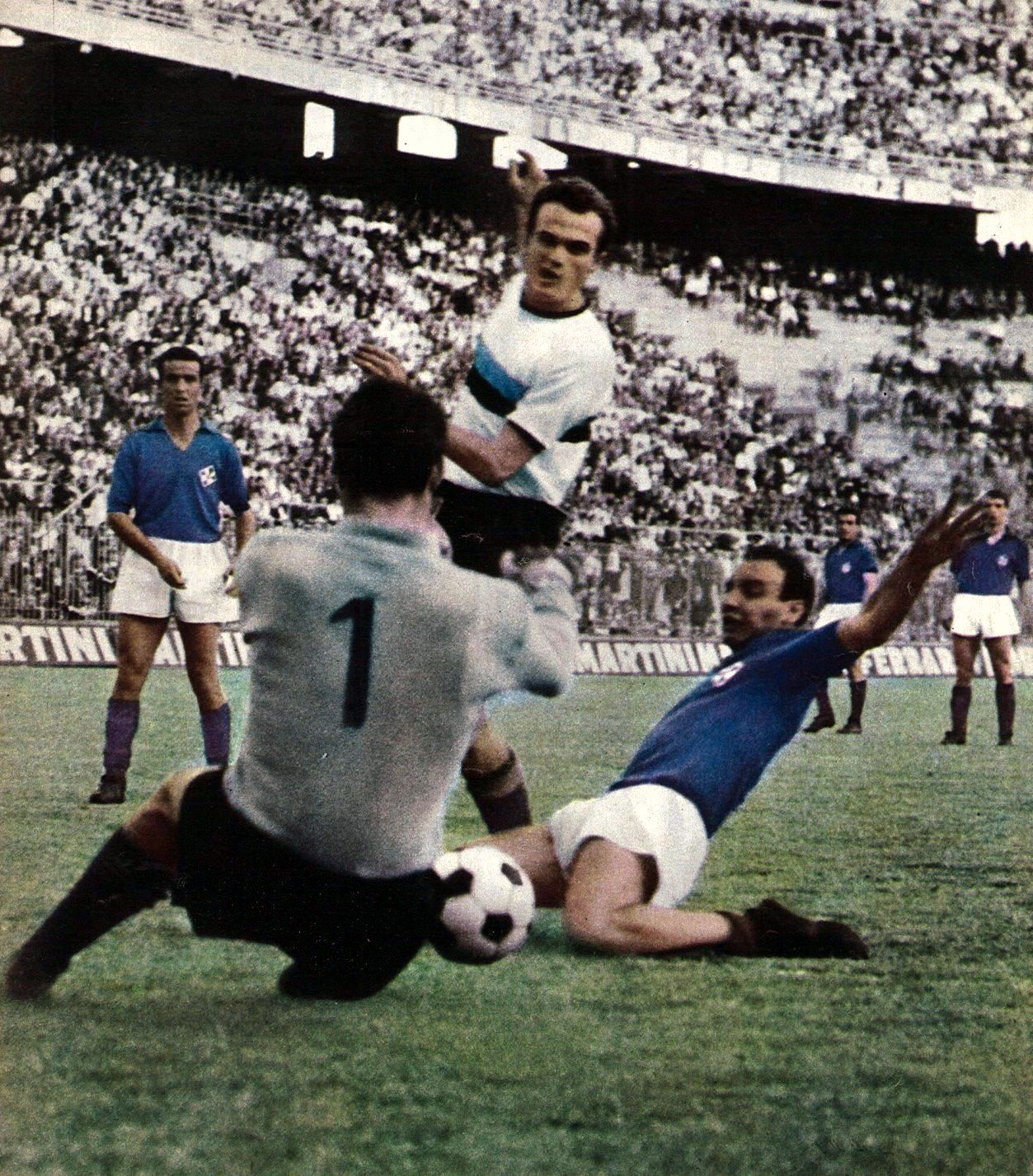
Mazzola playing for Nerazzurri in the 1960s

Mazzola is widely considered to be one of the greatest Italian football players of all time and one of the best players of his generation. A quick, talented, skilful, energetic, tactically intelligent and versatile player, he was capable of playing in several advanced positions. Known for his athleticism, defensive work-rate, and acrobatic ability in the air, he initially played as an offensive–minded central midfielder in his youth, known as the "mezzala" role in Italian, but was later primarily utilised as an inside-right under Herrera, a role in which he rose to fame, establishing himself as one of the best players in the world in his position; he was also used as a centre-forward, as a winger, as a main striker, or even as a supporting striker on occasion. In his later career, as he lost some of his speed and mobility, he was usually deployed in a more creative role as an offensive midfielder, which was aided by his passing range, vision, technique, ball skills, and close control; he was also capable of playing in a deeper midfield role, as a playmaker.

Despite occupying a more withdrawn, creative playing role for much of his career, Mazzola was also known to be a prolific goalscorer as a forward, due to his eye for goal, and his powerful and accurate striking ability from both inside and outside the area, as well as his ability to time his attacking runs and get on the end of his teammates' passes, which enabled him to win the Serie A top scorer award in 1965. However, Mazzola was most highly regarded during his prime for his outstanding pace, acceleration, and stamina, as well as his dribbling ability, agility, technical skills, and balance, in particular when running at full speed while in possession of the ball; his pace, combined with his excellent ball control and technical ability enabled him to beat defenders frequently during matches, both in one-on-one situations or when undertaking individual runs. In addition to his ability as a footballer, Mazzola also stood out due to his personality, strong character, mentality, determination, and leadership.

== Outside of football ==
On 3 July 1968, Mazzola founded the Italian Footballers' Association (AIC), in Milan, along with several fellow footballers, such as Giacomo Bulgarelli, Gianni Rivera, Ernesto Castano, Giancarlo De Sisti, and Giacomo Losi, as well as the recently retired Sergio Campana, also a lawyer, who was appointed president of the association.

He identified as Roman Catholic.

== Career statistics ==
=== Club ===
Appearances and goals by club, season and competition
Club	Season	League			Cup		Europe		Other		Total	
Club	Season	Division	Apps	Goals	Apps	Goals	Apps	Goals	Apps	Goals	Apps	Goals
Inter Milan	1960–61	Serie A	1	1	0	0	0	0	—		1	1
Inter Milan	1961–62	Serie A	1	0	0	0	0	0	—		1	0
Inter Milan	1962–63	Serie A	23	10	1	1	—		—		24	11
Inter Milan	1963–64	Serie A	30	9	0	0	9 (Note: Appearance(s) in European Cup)	7	—		39	16
Inter Milan	1964–65	Serie A	33	17	2	0	6	3	2 (Note: Appearance(s) in Intercontinental Cup)	1	43	21
Inter Milan	1965–66	Serie A	30	19	1	0	4	1	2	2	37	22
Inter Milan	1966–67	Serie A	30	17	2	2	10	4	—		42	23
Inter Milan	1967–68	Serie A	28	6	9	2	—		—		37	8
Inter Milan	1968–69	Serie A	29	7	3	0	—		—		32	7
Inter Milan	1969–70	Serie A	28	4	5	1	10 (Note: Appearance(s) in Inter-Cities Fairs Cup)	1	—		43	6
Inter Milan	1970–71	Serie A	29	7	3	2	1	0	2 (Note: Appearance(s) in Anglo-Italian Cup)	0	35	9
Inter Milan	1971–72	Serie A	28	7	9	2	9	2	—		46	11
Inter Milan	1972–73	Serie A	26	2	9	4	6 (Note: Appearance(s) in UEFA Cup)	0	—		41	6
Inter Milan	1973–74	Serie A	26	4	10	3	2	0	—		38	7
Inter Milan	1974–75	Serie A	23	3	7	0	4	0	—		34	3
Inter Milan	1975–76	Serie A	25	2	10	4	—		—		35	6
Inter Milan	1976–77	Serie A	28	1	9	3	2	0	—		39	4
Career total			418	116	80	24	63	18	6	3	567	161

=== International ===
Appearances and goals by national team and year
National team	Year	Apps	Goals
Italy	1963	4	1
Italy	1964	3	3
Italy	1965	8	6
Italy	1966	9	5
Italy	1967	3	3
Italy	1968	5	0
Italy	1969	4	2
Italy	1970	10	2
Italy	1971	5	0
Italy	1972	8	0
Italy	1973	6	0
Italy	1974	5	0
Total		70	22

== Honours ==
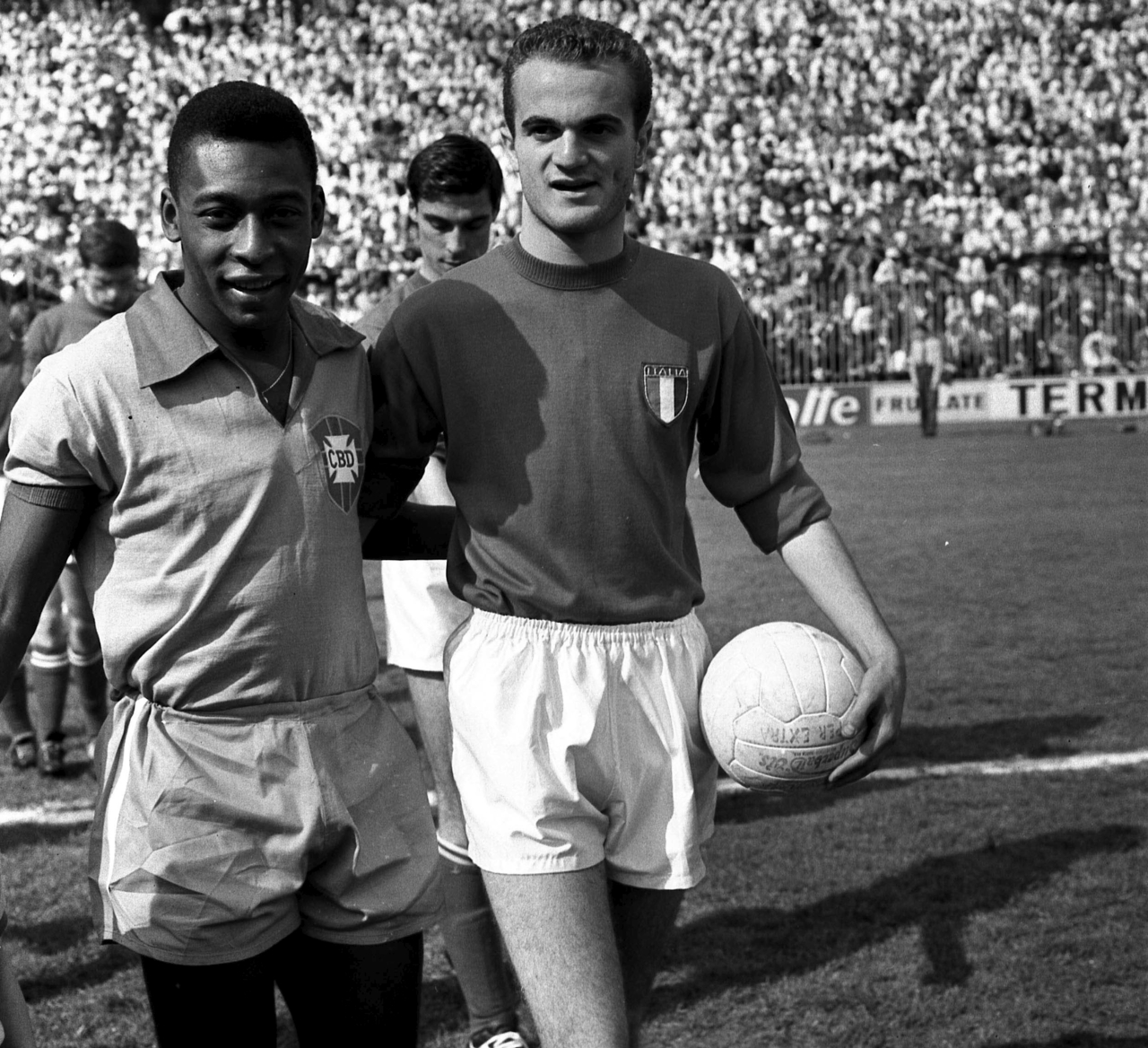
Sandro Mazzola, upon his debut with Italy, beside Pelé.

Inter Milan

- Serie A: 1962–63, 1964–65, 1965–66, 1970–71
- European Cup: 1963–64, 1964–65
- Intercontinental Cup: 1964, 1965

Italy

- UEFA European Championship: 1968
- FIFA World Cup runner-up: 1970

Individual

- Serie A top goalscorer: 1964–65 (17 goals)
- European Cup top goalscorer: 1963–64 (alongside Vladica Kovačević of Partizan, and Ferenc Puskás of Real Madrid, with seven goals)
- FUWO European Team of the Year: 1965
- FIFA XI: 1967
- World XI: 1965, 1967, 1968, 1971, 1974
- UEFA European Championship Team of the Tournament: 1968
- Ballon d'Or (2nd place): 1971
- Sport Ideal European XI: 1971
- Italian Football Hall of Fame: 2014
- Inter Milan Hall of Fame: 2022

== See also ==
- List of European association football families
