= Mario Giubertoni =

Italian footballer (born 1945)

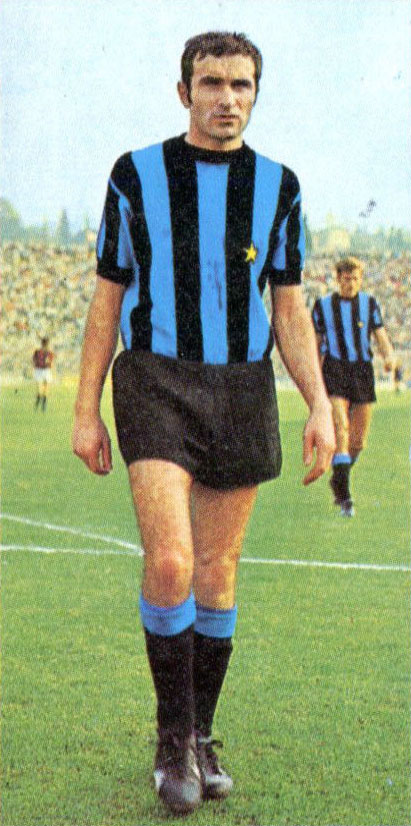
- Giubertoni with Inter Milan in 1970

Personal information
- Date of birth: 8 December 1945 (age 80)
- Place of birth: Moglia, Italy
- Height: 1.78 m (5 ft 10 in)
- Position: Defender

Senior career*
Years	Team	Apps	(Gls)
1963–1964	Moglia	32	(0)
1964–1970	Palermo	199	(2)
1970–1976	Internazionale	154	(1)
1976–1977	Verona	7	(0)
- * Club domestic league appearances and goals

Mario Giubertoni (born 8 December 1945 in Moglia) is an Italian former professional footballer who played as a defender.

== Honours ==
Inter

- Serie A champion: 1970–71
- European Cup runner up: 1971–72
