= Evert Skoglund =

Italian footballer (born 1953)

Personal information
- Date of birth: 10 May 1953 (age 73)
- Place of birth: Milan, Italy
- Height: 1.72 m (5 ft 7 1/2 in)
- Position: Midfielder

Senior career*
Years	Team	Apps	(Gls)
1970–1974	Internazionale	6	(0)
1974–1976	Sant'Angelo	55	(23)
1976–1977	Lecco	24	(5)
1977–1978	Lecce	29	(3)
1978–1982	Piacenza	105	(18)
1982–1983	Pro Patria	12	(1)
1983–1984	Latina	22	(2)
- * Club domestic league appearances and goals

Evert Skoglund (born 10 May 1953) is an Italian-Swedish former professional footballer. He played in many years in the Italian leagues.

His father Lennart Skoglund was a famous player for F.C. Internazionale Milano and Sweden men's national football team. His younger brother Giorgio Skoglund also played football professionally. To distinguish them, Evert was known as Skoglund I and Giorgio as Skoglund II.
