= Moglia =

Moglia La Mòja (Emilian)
- Comune
- Comune di Moglia
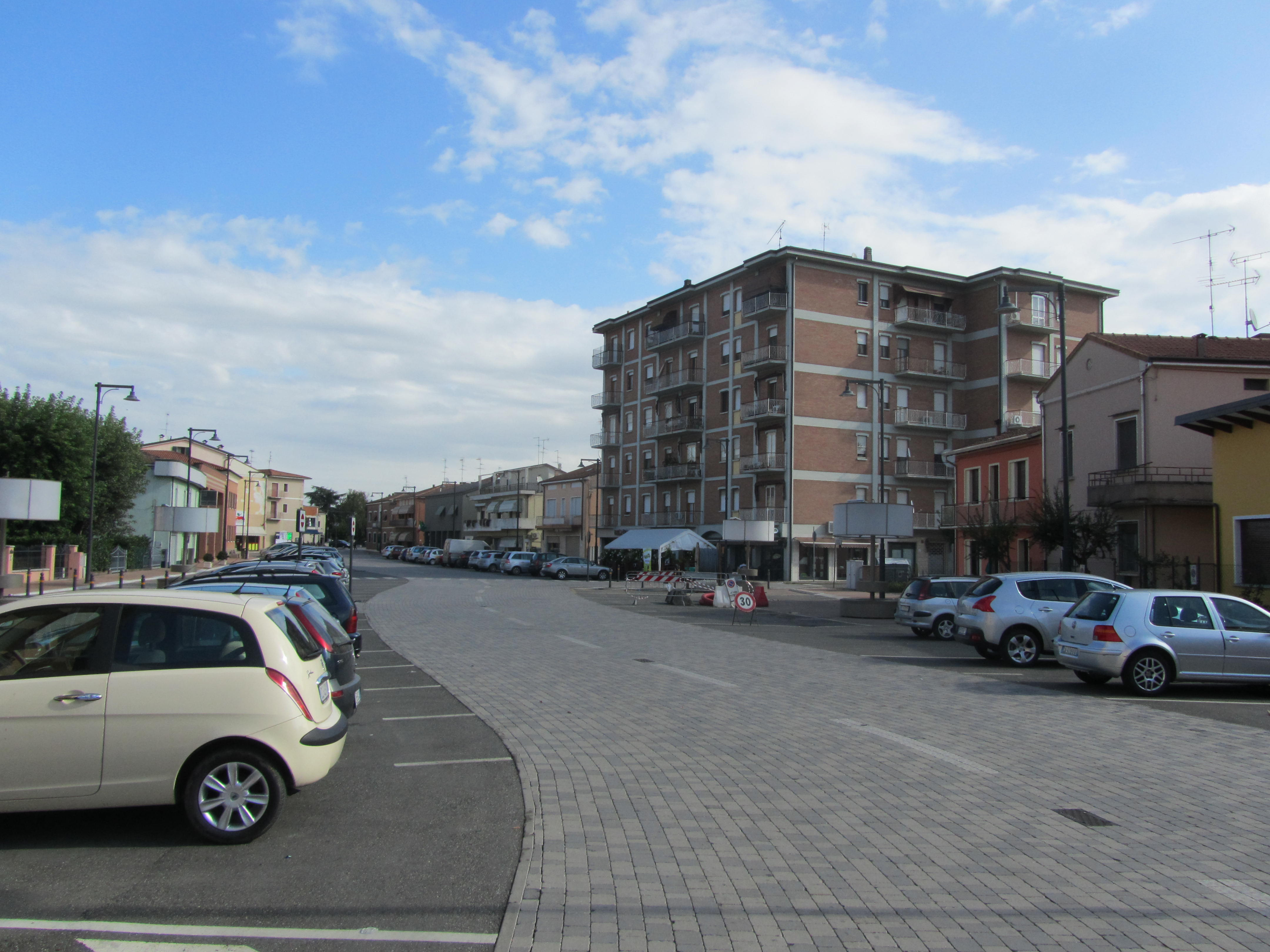

- Coat of arms

- Location within Italy Location within Lombardy
- Coordinates: 44°56′N 10°55′E
- Country: Italy
- Region: Lombardy
- Province: Mantua (MN)
- Frazioni: Bondanello, Coazze, Trivellano

Government
  - Mayor: Simona Maretti

Area
  - Total: 31.5 km^{2} (12.2 sq mi)
- Elevation: 20 m (66 ft)

Population (1 January 2011)
  - Total: 1,019
  - Density: 32.3/km^{2} (83.8/sq mi)
- Demonym: Mogliesi
- Time zone: UTC+1 (CET)
  - Summer (DST): UTC+2 (CEST)
- Postal code: 46024
- Dialing code: 0376
- Website: Official website

Moglia (Lower Mantovano: La Mòja) is a comune (municipality) in the Province of Mantua in the Italian region Lombardy, located about 150 kilometres (93 mi) southeast of Milan and about 30 kilometres (19 mi) southeast of Mantua.
