= Luigi Pogliana =

Italian footballer

Personal information
- Full name: Luigi Pogliana
- Date of birth: 25 January 1945
- Place of birth: Legnano, Italy
- Height: 1.70 m (5 ft 7 in)
- Position: Left back

Youth career
- Legnano

Senior career*
Years	Team	Apps	(Gls)
1962–1965	Legnano	66	(0)
1965–1967	Novara	52	(1)
1967–1977	Napoli	196	(6)
- * Club domestic league appearances and goals

Luigi Pogliana (born 25 January 1945) is an Italian former footballer who played as a defender.

== Honours ==
Napoli

- Coppa Italia champion: 1975–76.
