= Giancarlo Cella =

Italian footballer (1940–2026)

Personal information
- Date of birth: 5 September 1940
- Place of birth: Bobbio, Italy
- Date of death: January 2026 (aged 85)
- Height: 1.72 m (5 ft 8 in)
- Position: Defender

Senior career*
Years	Team	Apps	(Gls)
1957–1958	Piacenza	8	(3)
1958–1965	Torino	112	(7)
1959–1960	→ Novara (loan)	32	(7)
1965–1966	Catania	28	(0)
1966–1968	Atalanta	53	(0)
1968–1971	Inter Milan	42	(0)
1971–1972	Piacenza	33	(0)

Managerial career
- 1972–1974: Piacenza
- 1974–1975: Suzzara
- Inter Milan (youth)
- 1984–1985: Inter Milan (assistant coach)
- 1985–1986: Pavia
- 1986–1987: Carpi
- 1987: SPAL
- 1988–1989: Suzzara
- 1989–1993: Piacenza (youth)
- 1995–1996: Bobbiese
- * Club domestic league appearances and goals

Giancarlo Cella (5 September 1940 – January 2026) was an Italian footballer who played as a defender. He made more than 300 appearances in the Italian professional leagues, which included 172 appearances in Serie A, and then became a coach. He represented Italy at the 1960 Summer Olympics.

Cella died in January 2026, at the age of 85.

Cella's older brother Albino Cella also played football professionally. To distinguish them, Albino was known as Cella I and Giancarlo as Cella II. Giancarlo Cella was a great supporter of Bobbiese.

== Honours ==
Inter Milan

- Serie A: 1970–71
