= Mario Frustalupi =

Italian footballer (1942–1990)

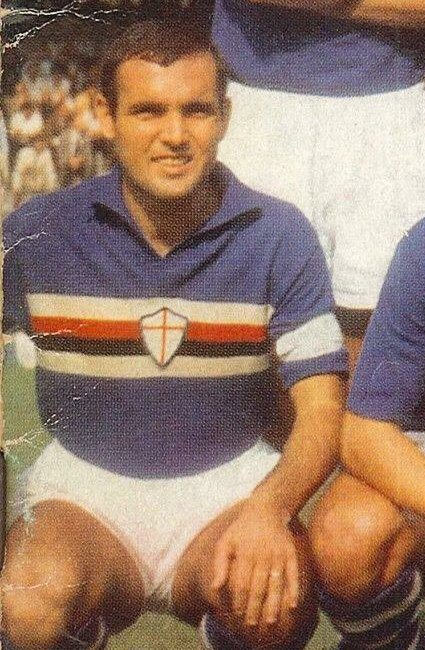
- Frustalupi as Sampdoria captain in the 1966–67 season

Personal information
- Date of birth: 16 September 1942
- Place of birth: Orvieto, Italy
- Date of death: 14 April 1990 (aged 47)
- Position: Midfielder

Senior career*
Years	Team	Apps	(Gls)
1961–1962	Empoli	19	(2)
1962–1970	Sampdoria	202	(22)
1970–1972	Internazionale	38	(2)
1972–1975	Lazio	88	(2)
1975–1977	Cesena	51	(8)
1977–1981	Pistoiese	108	(6)
- * Club domestic league appearances and goals

Mario Frustalupi (12 September 1942 – 14 April 1990) was an Italian footballer who was a midfielder.

== Playing career ==
Born in Orvieto, on 12 September 1942, Frustalupi debuted in Italian Serie A in 1963 with Sampdoria, for which he played for 8 seasons. A promising player in this youth, in 1970, he moved to FC Internazionale, then in need of a replacement for playmaker Luis Suárez in midfield, but Frustalupi disappointed and failed to live up to his potential, also struggling for a place in the starting line-up due to the presence of star player Sandro Mazzola. With the Milanese team, he won a scudetto and reached the final of the European Cup in 1972, losing against Ajax.

The following year, he was sold to S.S. Lazio. Although he often quarrelled with the club's leading star striker, Giorgio Chinaglia, he made the team one of the strongest in Italy, as shown by the side's scudetto victory in 1974. He also had a successful stint with A.C. Cesena, which under him reached its best result ever in the league, a sixth-place finish in Serie A and the right to play in the UEFA Cup.

In 1977, Frustalupi went to Pistoiese, being a protagonist of the first team's promotion to Serie A. He retired in 1981.

== Death ==
Frustalupi died on the highway near San Salvatore Monferrato in a car accident on 14 April 1990, aged 47, while he was going to Cervinia to join the family on holidays.
