= Mauro Bellugi =

Italian footballer (1950–2021)

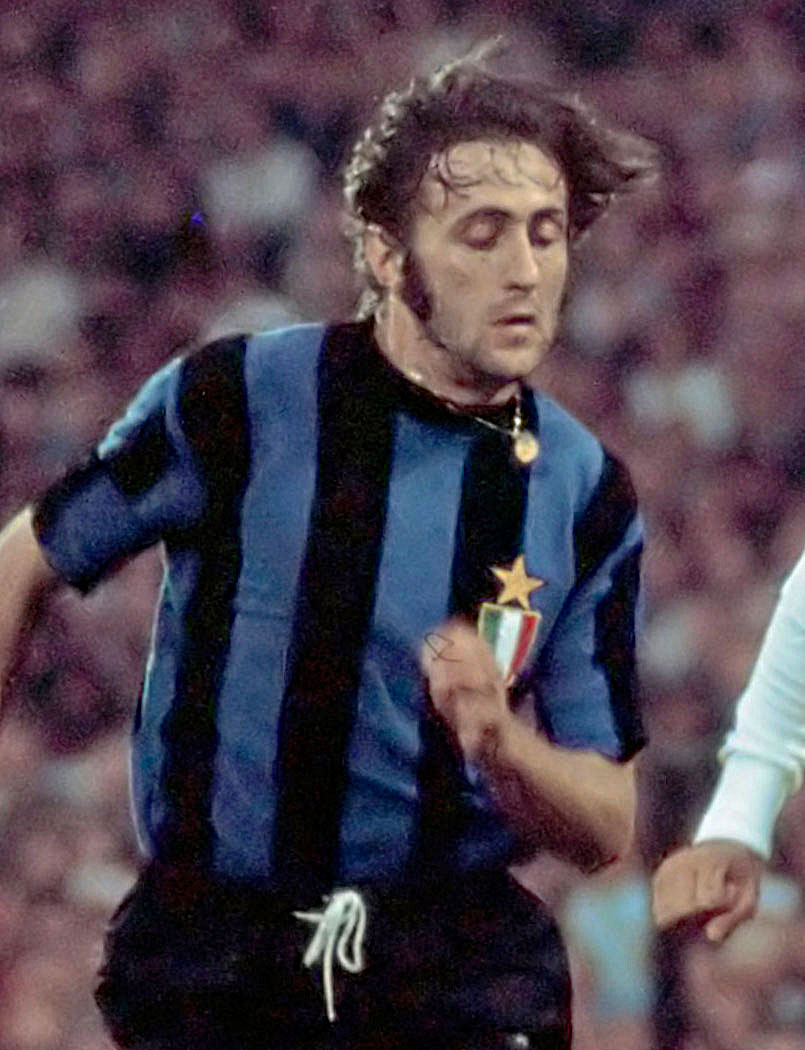
- Mauro Bellugi with Inter Milan in 1972

Personal information
- Full name: Mauro Bellugi
- Date of birth: 7 February 1950
- Place of birth: Buonconvento, Italy
- Date of death: 20 February 2021 (aged 71)
- Place of death: Milan, Italy
- Height: 1.83 m (6 ft 0 in)
- Position: Defender

Senior career*
Years	Team	Apps	(Gls)
1969–1974	Inter Milan	90	(1)
1974–1979	Bologna	93	(0)
1979–1980	Napoli	30	(0)
1980–1981	Pistoiese	20	(0)
Total		233	(1)

International career
1972–1980	Italy	32	(0)
- * Club domestic league appearances and goals

Mauro Bellugi (Italian pronunciation: [ˈmauro belˈluːdʒi]; 7 February 1950 – 20 February 2021) was an Italian footballer who played as a defender.

== Club career ==
Bellugi started his career with Inter Milan, making his debut for them on 31 August 1969 in a Coppa Italia match. In five seasons with Inter he played 90 Serie A matches, and 137 times in all senior competitions.

Bellugi later also played for Bologna F.C. (1974–79), S.S.C. Napoli (1979–80) and A.C. Pistoiese (1980–81).

== International career ==
Bellugi played 31 matches for the Italy national football team from 1972 to 1979. He played five games in the 1978 FIFA World Cup, where Italy managed a fourth-place finish, and was also in the squad for the 1974 tournament. His final game for Italy was against Switzerland in Udine on 17 November 1979. He was an unused member of the Italian squad that managed a fourth-place finish at UEFA Euro 1980 on home soil.

== Death ==
Bellugi died from complications of COVID-19 during the COVID-19 pandemic in Italy, thirteen days after his 71st birthday.
