= Giovanni Invernizzi (footballer, born 1931) =

Italian footballer and coach

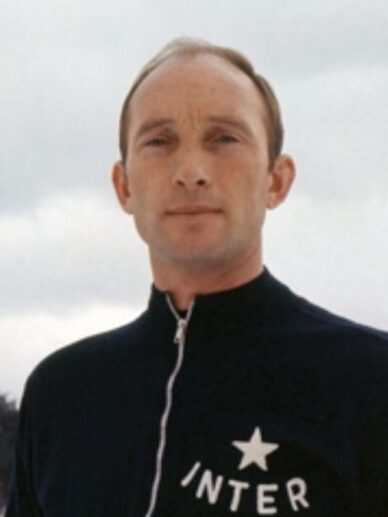
- Giovanni Invernizzi, Inter Milan manager

Personal information
- Date of birth: 26 August 1931
- Place of birth: Albairate, Italy
- Date of death: 28 February 2005 (aged 73)
- Place of death: Milan, Italy
- Height: 1.80 m (5 ft 11 in)
- Position: Midfielder

Senior career*
Years	Team	Apps	(Gls)
1949–1960	Internazionale	137	(6)
1950–1951	→ Genoa (loan)	19	(3)
1952–1953	→ Triestina (loan)	24	(0)
1953–1954	→ Udinese (loan)	26	(0)
1960–1961	Torino	17	(0)
1961–1962	Venezia	9	(0)
1962–1964	Como	47	(1)
Total		279	(10)

International career
1958	Italy	1	(0)

Managerial career
- 1970–1973: Internazionale
- 1973–1974: Taranto
- 1974–1975: Brindisi
- 1976–1977: Piacenza
- * Club domestic league appearances and goals

Giovanni Invernizzi (Italian pronunciation: [dʒoˈvanni iɱverˈnittsi]; 26 August 1931 – 28 February 2005) was an Italian professional football player and coach, who played as a midfielder.

== Honours ==
=== Manager ===
Inter Milan

- Serie A: 1970–71
- European Cup runner up: 1971–72
