= Marco Achilli =

Italian footballer

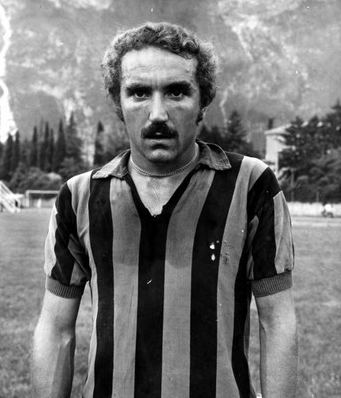

Personal information
- Date of birth: 9 December 1948
- Place of birth: Milan, Italy
- Date of death: 22 September 2009 (aged 60)
- Place of death: Milan, Italy
- Height: 1.75 m (5 ft 9 in)
- Position: Midfielder

Senior career*
Years	Team	Apps	(Gls)
1967–1968	Inter Milan	1	(0)
1968–1970	Monza	44	(10)
1970–1971	Inter Milan	3	(1)
1971–1972	Livorno	24	(5)
1975–1976	Albese		
- * Club domestic league appearances and goals

Marco Achilli (9 December 1948 – 22 September 2009) was an Italian footballer who played as a midfielder for a number of Italian sides, including Inter Milan, Monza, Livorno and Albese. His father was Camillo Achilli.
