= Alberto Reif =

Italian footballer (1946–2012)

Personal information
- Date of birth: October 14, 1946
- Place of birth: Spinea, Italy
- Date of death: October 15, 2012 (aged 66)
- Height: 1.78 m (5 ft 10 in)
- Position: Striker

Senior career*
Years	Team	Apps	(Gls)
1966–1967	Napoli	0	(0)
1967–1968	SPAL	9	(0)
1968–1969	L.R. Vicenza	19	(4)
1969–1971	Internazionale	12	(0)
1971–1972	Verona	16	(2)
1972–1973	Mantova	11	(0)
1973–1974	Roma	0	(0)
1974–1978	Mestrina		
- * Club domestic league appearances and goals

Alberto Reif (October 14, 1946 – October 15, 2012) was an Italian professional football player. He was born in Spinea.

== Honours ==
- Serie A champion: 1970/71.
