= FC Pistoiese SSD =

Italian football club

Pistoiese
- Full name: Football Club Pistoiese; Società Sportiva Dilettantistica a r.l.
- Nicknames: Arancioni (Orange); Olandesina (Little Dutch Girl)
- Founded: 1921; 1937 (refounded); 1945 (refounded); 1988 (refounded); 2009 (refounded)
- Ground: Stadio Marcello Melani, Pistoia, Italy
- Capacity: 13,195
- Chairman: Sergio Iorio
- Manager: Cristiano Lucarelli
- League: Serie D
- 2023–24: Serie D Group D, 18th of 18 (excluded)
Home colours	Away colours	Third colours

Football Club Pistoiese SSD, commonly known as Pistoiese, is an Italian association football club, based in Pistoia, Tuscany. Currently, Pistoiese plays in Serie D. Originally founded on 21 April 1921, the club has also played Serie A on a number of occasions, most recently in 1980, and is also nicknamed Olandesina (the little Hollander) due to its usage of orange as official colours.

== History ==
Since its inception la società arancione (Orange Society) founded on April 21, 1921, has been characterized by its European inclinations, being the city historically a crossroads of historical-religious paths to and from the geographical areas of the Old Continent.

Among the protagonists of the birth of l'Arancione are the Hungarians Árpád Hajós and János Nehadoma, with the jersey inspired by that of Holland, which boasts a strong floriculture.

In 1927, Pistoiese won their first major honours, the Arpinati Cup. After winning minor regional championships, they were elected to play in the National Division in 1928.

Between 1929 and 1936 they participated in the campionato cadetto finishing first on a couple of occasions. US Pistoiese played their last championship in 1939–40.

== Pistoiese Sports Union ==
Competitive football resumed in 1945 when a group of fans re-founded the team as Pistoiese Sports Union and was admitted to the Serie C. The following were characterized by a series of ups and downs between Serie C, Serie D, and the Promozione Championship, with a brief period in Serie B immediately after the Second World War, in which a third-place position was reached.

From 1946 to 1956–57, the team fluctuated between the leagues until Vannino Vannucci rose to the presidency in 1956–57, and Pistoiese became a "Jewel in the Nile" at a cost of 100 million lire.

In the 1958–59 championship, Pistoiese went 21 consecutive games without defeat, in this time amassing 36 points from a possible 42 (2 points for a win) and scoring 45 goals. Most memorable is the match against Empoli, a local rival and competitor for the promotion. The Arancione won 6–0. The final standing that season read 77 goals scored and 24 conceded. After eight years, they had again reached Serie C.

In the 1960s, the team participated for ten consecutive seasons in Serie C.

=== U.S. Pistoiese ===
Pistoiese achieved prominence by rising to Serie B in the late 1970s with promotion to Serie A following in 1980. Under the presidency of Marcello Melani, who chose veterans like Marcello Lippi and Mario Frustalupi and promising young talents such as Paolo Benedetti, Pistoiese reached Serie A in just 6 years and made a reasonable start, reaching as high as 6th after a win at Fiorentina in Round 13. But a dismal freefall resulted in a last-place finish and relegation. Since 1980, the club has only managed two stretches in Serie B (1995–96 and 1999–2002). Melani left his post in 1980, followed by Lippi in 1981.

=== A.C. Nuova Pistoiese 1988 ===
In the 2005–06 Serie C1/B campaign, Pistoiese battled against relegation from Serie C1 with goals proving hard to come by, yet having one of the best defensive records in the division. An excellent end to the season brought the team to a 9th-place finish in Group A, which was three points ahead of the relegation playoff. Pistoiese finished 14th in Group B in the 2007–08 season and competed in a relegation play-off against Sangiovannese. They won by 4–0 aggregate and remained in Lega Pro Prima Divisione (former Serie C1).

The Tuscan club started the 2008–09 season with Roberto Miggiano as head coach. Still, disappointing results and a last-place position in the Lega Pro Prima Divisione table led the club to replace him with Salvatore Polverino later in October. However, results did not improve under new boss Polverino, prompting him to tender his resignation in February 2009. He was replaced by former Juventus star Moreno Torricelli in his first stint as a professional head coach; under Torricelli's reign, Pistoiese managed to improve results and escape immediate relegation, ending in 16th place. Nevertheless, Pistoiese lost a play-off against Foligno and was relegated to Lega Pro Seconda Divisione.

In the summer of 2009, Pistoiese was not permitted enrollment in Lega Pro Seconda Divisione due to inadequate finances.

=== Unione Sportiva Pistoiese 1921 ===
On 13 August 2009 Unione Sportiva Pistoiese 1921 was created by Pistoia's mayor, Berti. The club was admitted to Tuscany's Eccellenza league and had an excellent inaugural year. It reached the play-off for promotion, but it eventually lost to Mosciano.

In the 2010–11 season, it won Eccellenza Tuscany Group A and was thus promoted to Serie D. Pistoiese reacquired professional status after winning the Girone E of the 2013–14 Serie D, therefore ensuring a spot in the 2014–15 Lega Pro. In the following season, it reached the national play-offs for Serie B.

In January 2021, the club was acquired by German entrepreneur Stefan Lehmann, the first foreign owner in Pistoiese history. Despite the new owner, the team was relegated to Serie D after losing the tie against Imolese. In the following season (2022-23) Pistoiese fails to reach the first position (arriving second), thus not returning to Serie C.

In April 2024, after another takeover and the arrest of new owner Maurizio De Simone, Pistoiese failed to show up for the following two league games, thus forcing the football league to exclude the club from the Serie D.

=== FC Pistoiese (2024–current) ===
Following the exclusion of the old Pistoiese, a new ownership led by entrepreneur Sergio Iorio founded a new club and successively acquired the naming rights of the original Pistoiese at a blind auction. The club successively acquired the sports rights of Aglianese, this way ensuring themselves a place in the 2024–25 Serie D season, and announcing Massimo Taibi as their new sporting director. On March 7, 2026, Pistoiese won the Coppa Italia Serie D against Ancona Calcio (2-0 in the first leg, 0-1 in the return leg, for a total of 3-0)

== Colors and badge ==
The team's colors are orange and blue.
