= Roberto Boninsegna =

Italian footballer (born 1943)

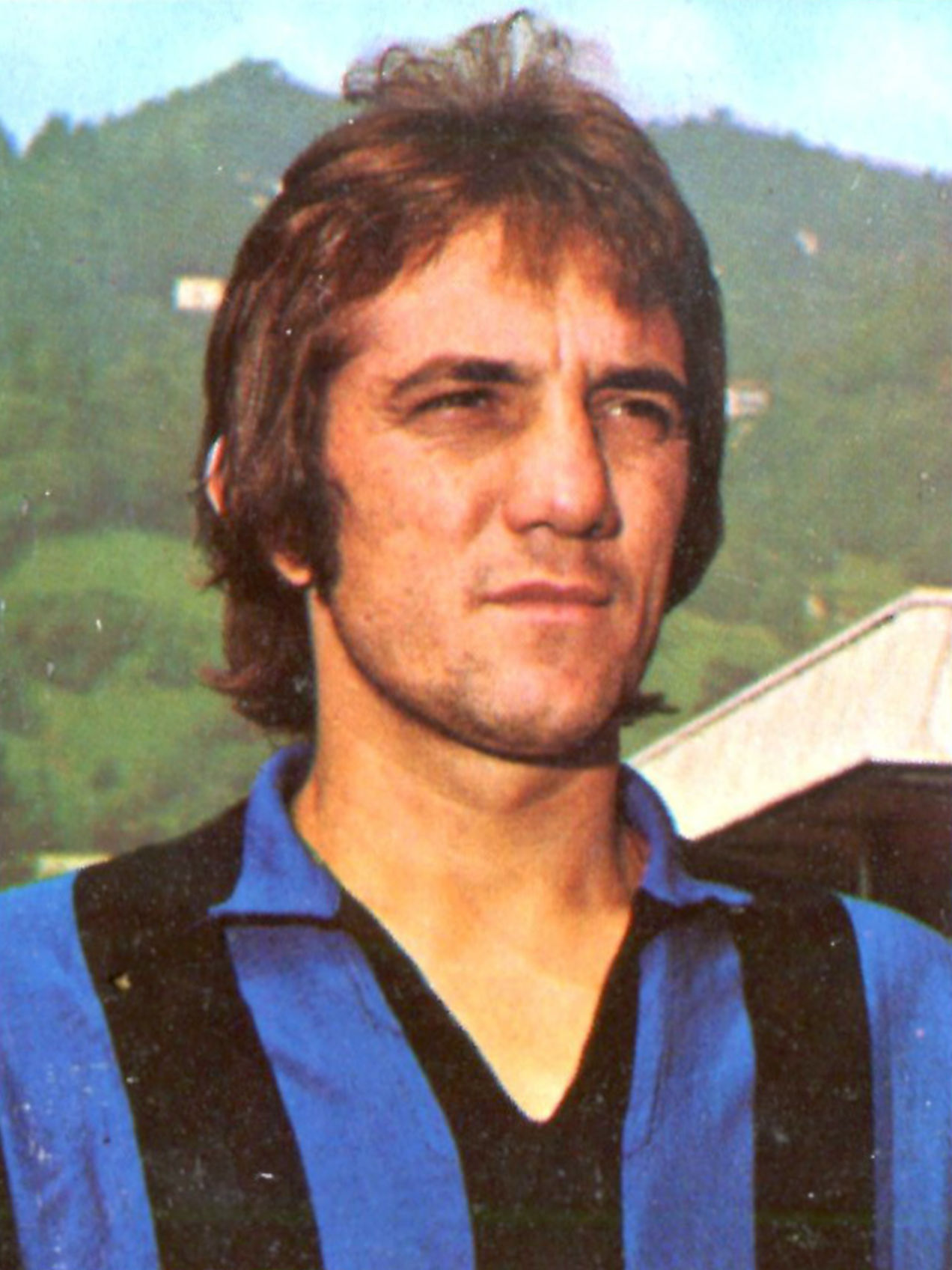
- Boninsegna with Inter Milan in 1973

Personal information
- Date of birth: 13 November 1943 (age 82)
- Place of birth: Mantua, Italy
- Height: 1.78 m (5 ft 10 in)
- Position: Striker

Youth career
- Inter Milan

Senior career*
Years	Team	Apps	(Gls)
1963–1964	Prato	22	(1)
1964–1965	Potenza	32	(9)
1965–1966	Varese	28	(5)
1966–1969	Cagliari	83	(23)
1967	Chicago Mustangs (American tour)	9	(11)
1969–1976	Inter Milan	197	(113)
1976–1979	Juventus	58	(22)
1979–1980	Verona	14	(3)
Total		443	(186)

International career
1967–1974	Italy	22	(9)
Medal record
Representing Italy
Men's Football
FIFA World Cup
Runner-up	1970 Mexico
- * Club domestic league appearances and goals

Roberto Boninsegna (Italian pronunciation: [roˈbɛrto boninˈseɲɲa, - ˌbɔ-]; born 13 November 1943) is an Italian former professional footballer who mainly played as a forward. After retiring, he worked as a football manager. As a player, he played for the Italy national side at two World Cups, reaching the final in 1970.

== Club career ==
Born at Mantua, Boninsegna started his career in Serie B (the second tier of Italian professional football) with Prato in 1963–64 season. He transferred to Potenza, who was Serie B team in 1964–65 season. He also played for Varese in 1965–66 and Cagliari between 1966 and 1969, helping the club to a second-place finish during the 1968–69 Serie A season alongside Luigi Riva. During the summer of 1967, Cagliari came to the United States to play in the United Soccer Association as the Chicago Mustangs; Boninsegna led the club in scoring with 11 goals in nine matches. Boninsegna gained a status as an efficient striker with Inter Milan and the Italy national team in the 1970s, playing alongside Sandro Mazzola. In Serie A, he totaled 163 goals in 366 games, and was top goalscorer in Italy during the 1970–71 and 1971–72 Serie A seasons, with Inter.

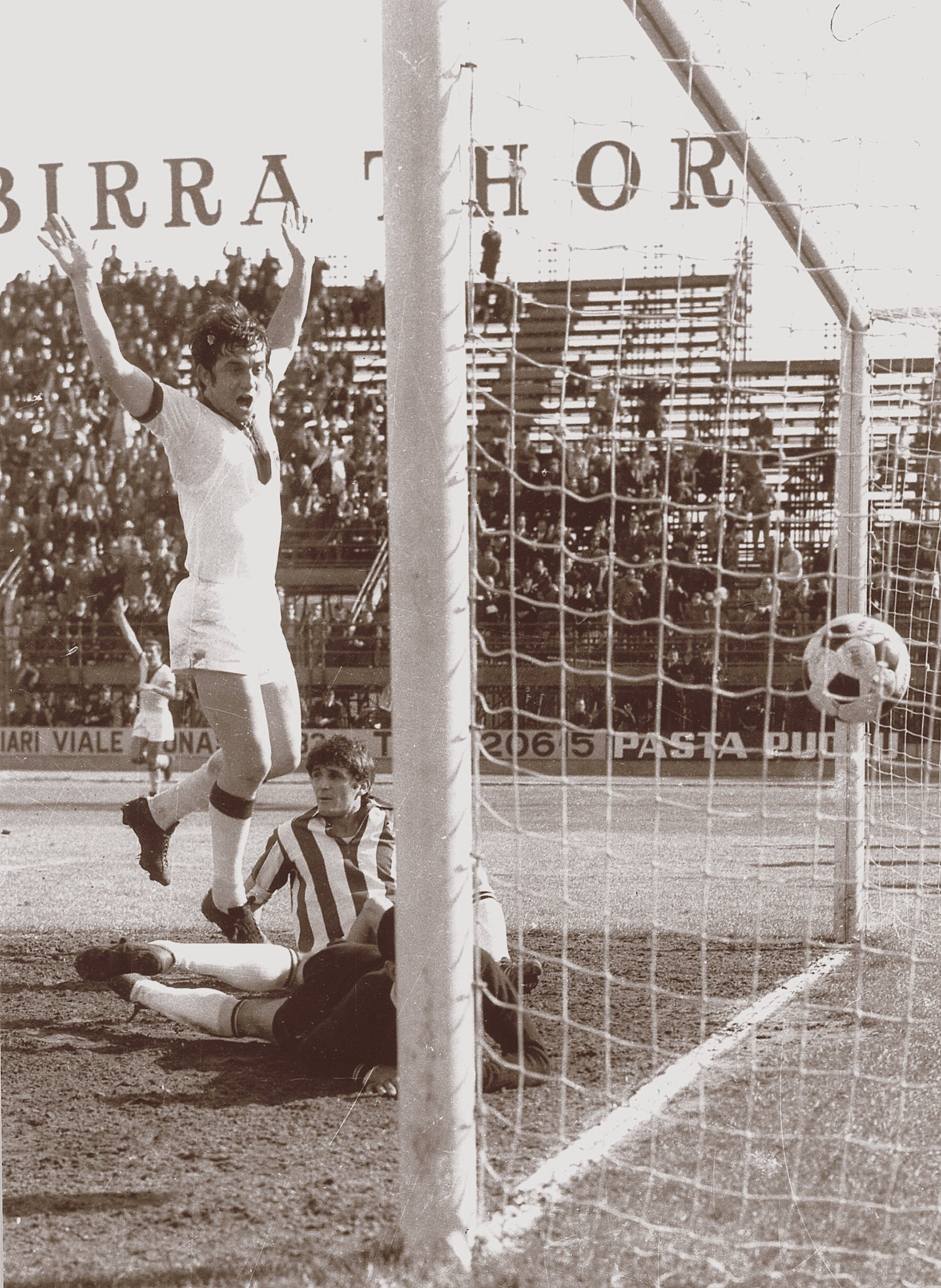
Boninsegna scoring for Cagliari in the late 1960s

After moving to Inter in 1969, he also won the 1970–71 Serie A title with the club, and reached the 1972 European Cup Final, only to be defeated by Ajax. He transferred to Juventus in 1976 in exchange for Pietro Anastasi; he played three seasons for the club, winning two Serie A titles, a Coppa Italia and a UEFA Cup. After leaving Juventus in 1979, he finished his career with Verona, retiring from professional football at the end of the 1979–80 Serie B season.

== International career ==
Boninsegna made his debut for Italy on 18 November 1967, in an away UEFA Euro 1968 qualifying match against Switzerland, which ended 2–2, although he was not called up for the final tournament, which Italy ended up winning on home soil under manager Ferruccio Valcareggi, with whom he would have several disagreements throughout his international career. With the national side, he took part in two World Cups, the first in 1970, and the second in 1974. In total, he managed 9 goals for Italy in 22 appearances.

Boninsegna was a member of the Italian side that reached the final of the 1970 FIFA World Cup in Mexico, scoring two goals throughout the tournament. In the epic semi-final match against West-Germany, he scored a goal, and later set up Gianni Rivera's match-winning goal in extra time, which allowed Italy to advance to the final after a 4–3 victory. He scored Italy's only goal (though at the time it was an important equaliser) in the final against Brazil, which Italy ultimately lost 4–1; he came off for Rivera in the final minutes of the game.

== Style of play ==
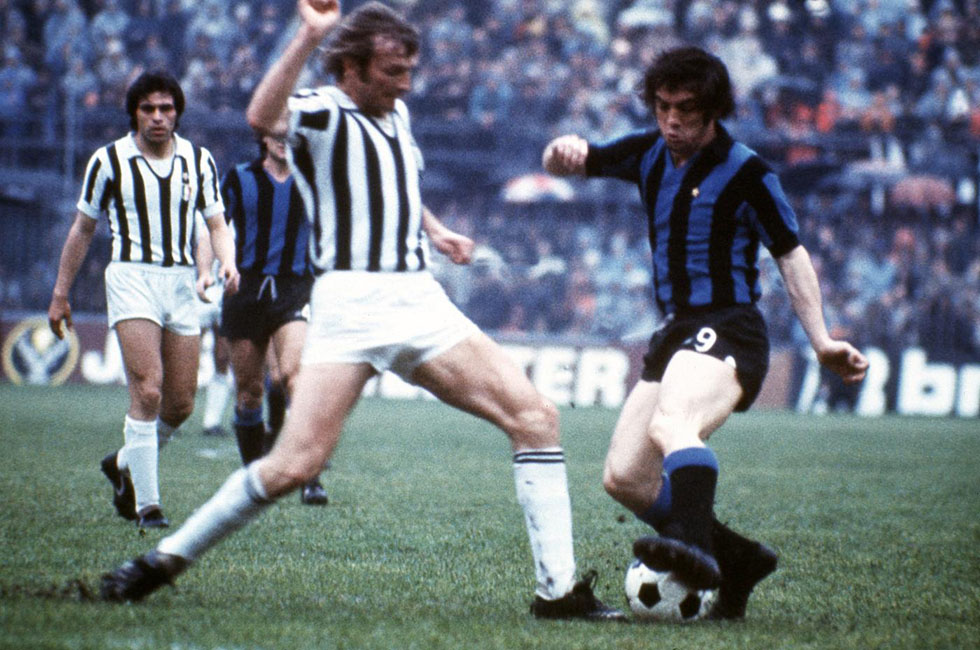
Boninsegna (right) playing for Inter Milan in 1974 against his iconic rival, the juventino and future teammate Francesco Morini.

As a player, Boninsegna was a powerful, agile and acrobatic striker, who was known for his accurate finishing ability and intelligence in the penalty area. He was a prolific goalscorer, who excelled in the air, despite not being particularly tall or imposing physically. He was also gifted with pace, stamina, technical ability, opportunism and outstanding consistency, which enabled him to become one of the top Italian forwards of his generation. Despite his talent, he was criticised on occasion for being a selfish player, although he was also capable of creating chances for teammates. He was also well known for his on the field rivalry with Juventus defender Francesco Morini, who later became his teammate.

== Career statistics ==
=== Club ===
Appearances and goals by club, season and competition
Club	Season	League		
Club	Season	Division	Apps	Goals
Prato	1963–64	Serie B	22	1
Potenza	1964–65	Serie B	32	9
Varese	1965–66	Serie A	28	5
Cagliari	1966–67	Serie A	34	9
Cagliari	1967–68	Serie A	19	5
Cagliari	1968–69	Serie A	30	9
Cagliari	Total		83	23
Chicago Mustangs	1967	United Soccer Association	9	11
Inter Milan	1969–70	Serie A	30	13
Inter Milan	1970–71	Serie A	28	24
Inter Milan	1971–72	Serie A	28	22
Inter Milan	1972–73	Serie A	27	12
Inter Milan	1973–74	Serie A	29	23
Inter Milan	1974–75	Serie A	29	9
Inter Milan	1975–76	Serie A	26	10
Inter Milan	Total		197	113
Juventus	1976–77	Serie A	29	10
Juventus	1977–78	Serie A	21	10
Juventus	1978–79	Serie A	8	2
Juventus	Total		58	22
Verona	1979–80	Serie B	14	3
Career total			443	186

=== International ===
Appearances and goals by national team and year
National team	Year	Apps	Goals
Italy	1967	1	0
Italy	1968	0	0
Italy	1969	0	0
Italy	1970	7	3
Italy	1971	6	4
Italy	1972	3	1
Italy	1973	0	0
Italy	1974	5	1
Italy	Total	22	9

== Honours ==
Inter Milan

- Serie A: 1970–71

Juventus

- Serie A: 1976–77, 1977–78
- Coppa Italia: 1978–79
- UEFA Cup: 1976–77

Italy

- FIFA World Cup runner-up: 1970

Individual

- Serie A top scorer: 1970–71, 1971–72
- Coppa Italia top scorer: 1971–72
- United Soccer Association top scorer: 1967
- Italian Football Hall of Fame: 2023

Sporting positions
Preceded by Gigi Riva	Serie A Top Scorer; 1970–71 & 1971–72	Succeeded by Paolo Pulici; Gianni Rivera; Giuseppe Savoldi
