= Bernardino Fabbian =

Italian footballer (1950–2023)

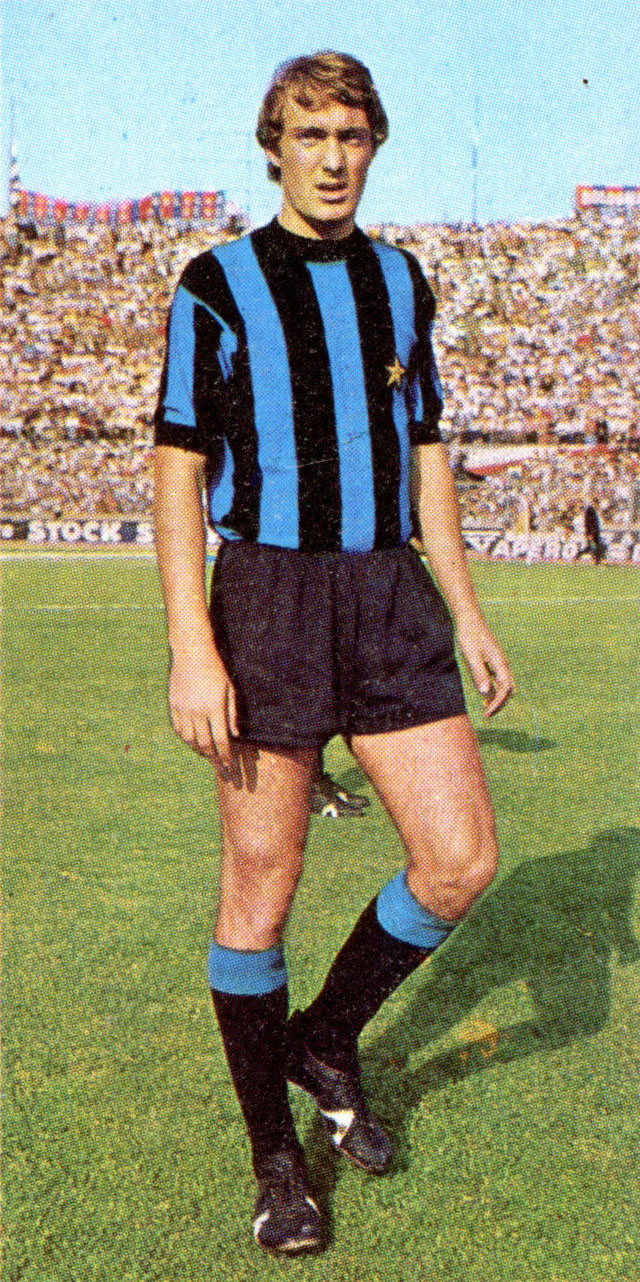
- Fabbian with Inter Milan in 1970

Personal information
- Date of birth: 11 February 1950
- Place of birth: Resana, Italy
- Date of death: 22 September 2023 (aged 73)
- Place of death: Montebelluna, Italy
- Height: 1.76 m (5 ft 9 in)
- Position: Midfielder

Senior career*
Years	Team	Apps	(Gls)
1970–1973	Inter Milan	22	(0)
1972–1973	→ Reggiana (loan)	12	(0)
1973–1978	Foggia	43	(1)
1976–1977	→ Novara (loan)	20	(0)
1978–1982	Abano Terme		
- * Club domestic league appearances and goals

Bernardino Fabbian (11 February 1950 – 22 September 2023) was an Italian professional footballer who played as a midfielder.

Grew up in Inter Milan's youth academy, he won a Scudetto before playing with other Serie A and Serie B teams. He also played with the Italy national under-21 football team. Fabbian died in Montebelluna on 22 September 2023, at the age of 73.

== Honours ==
Inter Milan

- Serie A: 1970–71
