= Sergio Pellizzaro =

Italian footballer

Personal information
- Full name: Sergio Pellizzaro Domenicacci
- Date of birth: 1 March 1945 (age 81)
- Place of birth: Montebello Vicentino, Italy
- Height: 1.68 m (5 ft 6 in)
- Position: Midfielder

Senior career*
Years	Team	Apps	(Gls)
1963–1964	Mantova	4	(0)
1964–1965	Empoli	26	(10)
1965–1966	Mantova	36	(5)
1966–1967	Roma	12	(1)
1967–1968	Catanzaro	37	(14)
1968–1970	Palermo	56	(16)
1970	Internazionale	4	(0)
1970–1971	Palermo	29	(7)
1971–1972	Internazionale	15	(2)
1972–1974	Atalanta	55	(8)
1974–1976	Perugia	39	(10)
1976–1978	Rimini	46	(6)
- * Club domestic league appearances and goals

Sergio Pellizzaro Domenicacci, known as Sergio Pellizzaro (born 1 March 1945 in Montebello Vicentino) is an Italian former professional footballer who played as a midfielder.
