= 1970–71 Serie A =

68th season of top-tier Italian football

Serie A
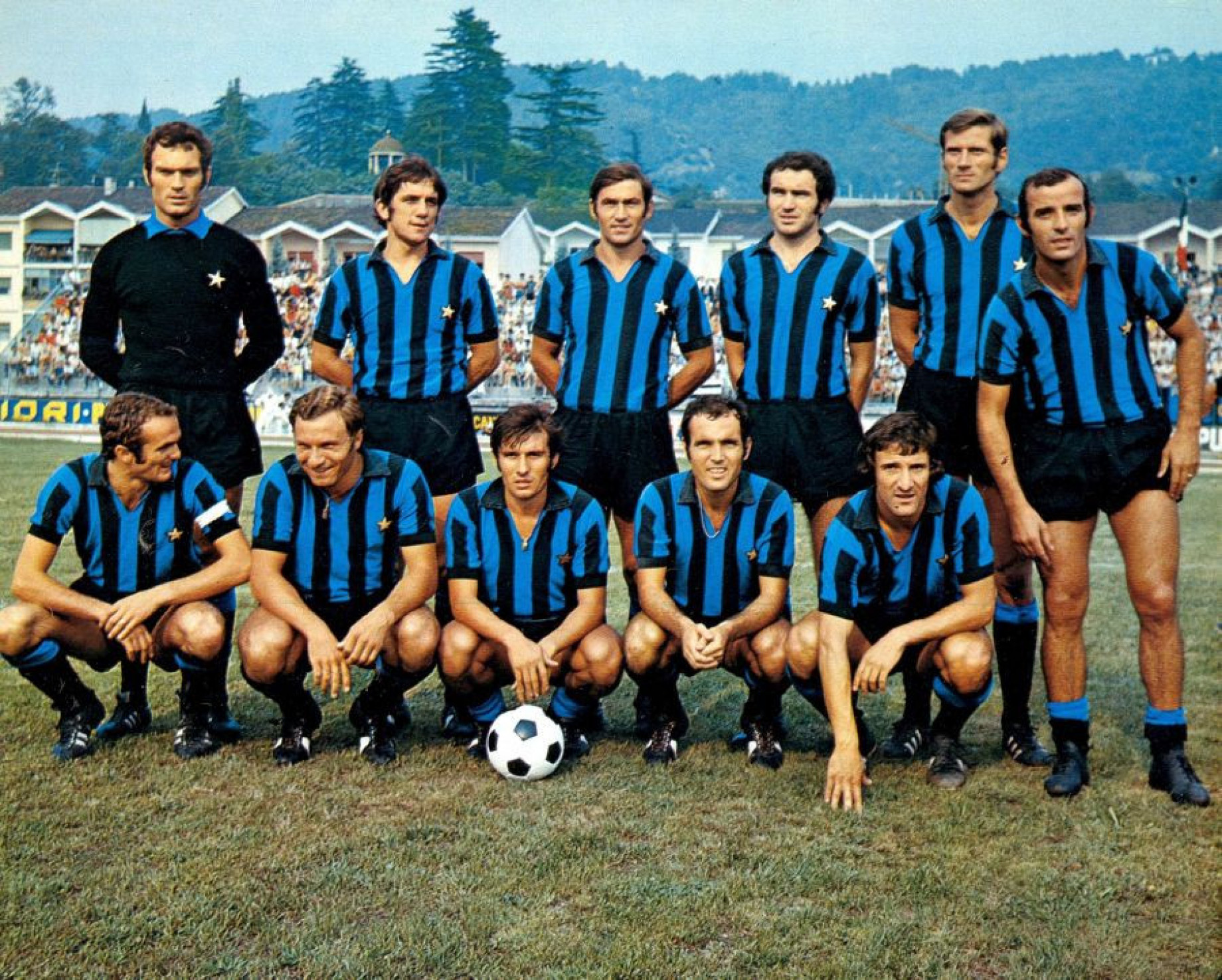
- 1970–71 Internazionale team
- Season: 1970–71
- Dates: 27 September 1970 – 23 May 1971
- Champions: Internazionale; 11th title
- Relegated: Foggia; Lazio; Catania
- European Cup: Internazionale
- Cup Winners' Cup: Torino FC
- UEFA Cup: Milan; Napoli; Juventus; Bologna
- Matches: 240
- Goals: 505 (2.1 per match)
- Top goalscorer: Roberto Boninsegna (24 goals)

Serie A 1970-71 team distribution

The 1970–71 Serie A season was won by Internazionale.

== Teams ==
Varese, Foggia and Catania had been promoted from Serie B.

== Final classification ==
| Pos | Team | Pld | W | D | L | GF | GA | GD | Pts | Qualification or relegation |
|---|---|---|---|---|---|---|---|---|---|---|
| 1 | Internazionale (C) | 30 | 19 | 8 | 3 | 50 | 26 | +24 | 46 | Qualification to European Cup |
| 2 | Milan | 30 | 15 | 12 | 3 | 54 | 26 | +28 | 42 | Qualification to UEFA Cup |
| 3 | Napoli | 30 | 15 | 9 | 6 | 33 | 19 | +14 | 39 | Qualification to UEFA Cup |
| 4 | Juventus | 30 | 11 | 13 | 6 | 41 | 30 | +11 | 35 | Qualification to UEFA Cup |
| 5 | Bologna | 30 | 10 | 14 | 6 | 30 | 24 | +6 | 34 | Qualification to UEFA Cup |
| 6 | Roma | 30 | 7 | 18 | 5 | 32 | 25 | +7 | 32 | |
| 7 | Cagliari | 30 | 8 | 14 | 8 | 33 | 35 | −2 | 30 | |
| 8 | Torino | 30 | 6 | 14 | 10 | 27 | 30 | −3 | 26 | Qualification to Cup Winners' Cup |
| 9 | Varese | 30 | 5 | 16 | 9 | 29 | 33 | −4 | 26 | |
| 10 | Vicenza | 30 | 6 | 14 | 10 | 23 | 31 | −8 | 26 | |
| 11 | Hellas Verona | 30 | 7 | 12 | 11 | 23 | 35 | −12 | 26 | |
| 12 | Sampdoria | 30 | 6 | 13 | 11 | 30 | 34 | −4 | 25 | |
| 13 | Fiorentina | 30 | 3 | 19 | 8 | 26 | 32 | −6 | 25 | |
| 14 | Foggia (R) | 30 | 6 | 13 | 11 | 28 | 43 | −15 | 25 | Relegation to Serie B |
| 15 | Lazio (R) | 30 | 5 | 12 | 13 | 28 | 43 | −15 | 22 | Relegation to Serie B |
| 16 | Catania (R) | 30 | 5 | 11 | 14 | 18 | 39 | −21 | 21 | Relegation to Serie B |

Source: Panini
(C) Champions; (R) Relegated

== Results ==
| Home \ Away | BOL | CAG | CTN | FIO | FOG | INT | JUV | LRV | LAZ | MIL | NAP | ROM | SAM | TOR | VAR | HEL |
|---|---|---|---|---|---|---|---|---|---|---|---|---|---|---|---|---|
| Bologna | | 0–0 | 2–0 | 0–0 | 1–2 | 2–2 | 1–0 | 3–0 | 2–0 | 3–2 | 1–0 | 0–0 | 1–1 | 1–0 | 1–0 | 2–2 |
| Cagliari | 2–1 | | 1–1 | 2–0 | 1–1 | 0–0 | 1–1 | 1–1 | 2–1 | 0–4 | 1–1 | 0–1 | 2–1 | 0–0 | 1–1 | 4–1 |
| Catania | 0–0 | 1–1 | | 0–0 | 2–0 | 0–1 | 0–1 | 1–1 | 3–1 | 0–0 | 1–0 | 1–2 | 1–3 | 1–0 | 0–0 | 0–1 |
| Fiorentina | 1–2 | 1–2 | 1–1 | | 3–0 | 2–2 | 1–2 | 0–0 | 1–1 | 2–5 | 0–1 | 2–2 | 0–0 | 1–1 | 1–1 | 1–1 |
| Foggia | 1–1 | 0–0 | 1–0 | 1–1 | | 1–1 | 0–0 | 1–1 | 5–2 | 1–1 | 0–3 | 1–0 | 2–2 | 1–0 | 2–2 | 3–0 |
| Internazionale | 1–0 | 1–3 | 3–2 | 2–1 | 5–0 | | 2–0 | 2–1 | 1–1 | 2–0 | 2–1 | 0–0 | 3–1 | 2–0 | 3–2 | 1–0 |
| Juventus | 0–0 | 2–1 | 5–0 | 1–1 | 2–1 | 1–1 | | 2–1 | 3–1 | 0–2 | 4–1 | 2–0 | 3–1 | 3–3 | 2–2 | 2–1 |
| Vicenza | 0–0 | 1–1 | 0–0 | 0–1 | 1–0 | 1–2 | 1–1 | | 1–0 | 1–1 | 0–1 | 0–0 | 0–0 | 1–1 | 3–1 | 0–0 |
| Lazio | 2–2 | 2–4 | 1–0 | 0–0 | 2–1 | 0–1 | 2–2 | 0–1 | | 0–1 | 0–0 | 1–1 | 1–0 | 1–0 | 0–0 | 1–1 |
| Milan | 2–1 | 3–1 | 4–0 | 1–0 | 2–0 | 3–0 | 1–1 | 3–1 | 1–1 | | 1–1 | 2–2 | 3–1 | 1–0 | 1–2 | 1–1 |
| Napoli | 3–0 | 1–0 | 1–0 | 0–0 | 0–0 | 2–1 | 1–0 | 1–0 | 2–0 | 0–2 | | 1–2 | 0–0 | 2–0 | 1–0 | 2–0 |
| Roma | 1–1 | 0–0 | 5–0 | 0–1 | 3–1 | 0–0 | 0–0 | 4–1 | 2–2 | 1–1 | 2–2 | | 0–0 | 1–1 | 3–0 | 0–0 |
| Sampdoria | 1–2 | 0–0 | 2–0 | 2–2 | 2–0 | 0–2 | 2–0 | 1–2 | 2–3 | 1–1 | 0–1 | 0–0 | | 0–0 | 2–1 | 3–0 |
| Torino | 1–0 | 2–1 | 1–1 | 1–1 | 1–1 | 0–2 | 2–1 | 2–3 | 1–1 | 1–1 | 1–1 | 4–0 | 0–0 | | 3–1 | 1–0 |
| Varese | 0–0 | 4–1 | 0–1 | 0–0 | 3–0 | 1–3 | 0–0 | 0–0 | 2–1 | 1–1 | 1–1 | 0–0 | 1–1 | 0–0 | | 2–0 |
| Hellas Verona | 0–0 | 2–0 | 1–1 | 1–1 | 1–1 | 1–2 | 0–0 | 1–0 | 1–0 | 1–3 | 0–2 | 1–0 | 3–1 | 1–0 | 1–1 | |

Source: Almanacco Illustrato del Calcio - La Storia 1898-2004, Panini Edizioni, Modena, September 2005 (in Italian)
Legend: Blue = home team win; Yellow = draw; Red = away team win.

== Top goalscorers ==
| Rank | Player | Club | Goals |
|---|---|---|---|
| 1 | (Italy) Roberto Boninsegna | Internazionale | 24 |
| 2 | (Italy) Pierino Prati | Milan | 19 |
| 3 | (Italy) Giuseppe Savoldi | Bologna | 15 |
| 4 | (Italy) Roberto Bettega | Juventus | 13 |
| 5 | (Brazil) Sergio Clerici | Hellas Verona | 10 |
| 6 | (Italy) Giorgio Chinaglia | Lazio | 9 |
| 6 | (Italy) Ermanno Cristin | Sampdoria | 9 |

== Attendances ==
| # | Club | Average |
|---|---|---|
| 1 | Milan | 53,319 |
| 2 | Napoli | 52,399 |
| 3 | Roma | 45,551 |
| 4 | Internazionale | 45,248 |
| 5 | Lazio | 37,979 |
| 6 | Cagliari | 36,902 |
| 7 | Fiorentina | 35,422 |
| 8 | Juventus | 35,415 |
| 9 | Bologna | 26,825 |
| 10 | Torino | 26,234 |
| 11 | Sampdoria | 23,177 |
| 12 | Hellas Verona | 20,781 |
| 13 | Foggia | 16,558 |
| 14 | Vicenza | 15,351 |
| 15 | Varese | 11,108 |
| 16 | Catania | 10,617 |

== References and sources ==
- Almanacco Illustrato del Calcio - La Storia 1898-2004, Panini Edizioni, Modena, September 2005
