= 1964–65 Inter Milan season =

Football Club Internazionale
1964–1965 season
- Chairman: Angelo Moratti
- Manager: Helenio Herrera
- Stadium: San Siro
- Serie A: 1st
- European Cup: Winners
- Intercontinental Cup: Winners
- Coppa Italia: Runners-up
- Top goalscorer: League: Mazzola (17); All: Mazzola (21)
Home colours	Away colours	Third colours

== Season ==
Due to the European achievement in the 1963–64 season, Inter also debuted in the Intercontinental Cup facing off with Independiente. After two legs, the aggregate score resulted in a draw; the cup was awarded by a tie-breaker, in which Inter won 1–0 at extra time.

In Serie A Inter suffered a 3–0 loss in the Derby della Madonnina. In late January, there were two draws in row and an uprising defeat, by Foggia in matchday 19. So, in the middle of the season, AC Milan had 7 points over Inter with 15 games to play. The following months saw a historical comeback from the side, that won 13 times and drew twice: 28 points were earned this way, resulting in first place. Mazzola had a central role in team play, scoring 17 goals to be the league's top-scorer.

On May 27, a year on exactly from the previous win, Inter retained the European title by beating Benfica at the San Siro: Jair was the scorer.

== Squad ==
Note: Flags indicate national team as defined under FIFA eligibility rules; some limited exceptions apply. Players may hold more than one non-FIFA nationality.

Pos.	Nation	Player
GK	ITA	Ottavio Bugatti
GK	ITA	Rosario Di Vincenzo
GK	ITA	Giuliano Sarti
DF	ITA	Tarcisio Burgnich
DF	ITA	Giorgio Dellagiovanna
DF	ITA	Giacinto Facchetti
DF	ITA	Aristide Guarneri
DF	ITA	Spartaco Landini
DF	ITA	Armando Picchi
MF	ITA	Gianfranco Bedin
MF	ITA	Mario Corso
MF	ITA	Sergio Gori

Pos.	Nation	Player
MF	ITA	Saul Malatrasi
MF	ITA	Sandro Mazzola
MF	ESP	Luis Suárez
MF	ITA	Carlo Tagnin
MF	ITA	Franco Zaglio
FW	ITA	Francesco Canella
FW	BRA	Jair
FW	ITA	Angelo Domenghini
FW	ITA	Aurelio Milani
FW	ESP	Joaquín Peiró
FW	ITA	Bruno Petroni

=== Transfers ===
In
Pos.	Name	from	Type
GK	Rosario Di Vincenzo	Triestina	
DF	Giorgio Dellagiovanna	Potenza	
DF	Saul Malatrasi	Roma	
MF	Gianfranco Bedin	Primavera	
FW	Francesco Canella	Fiorentina	
FW	Angelo Domenghini	Atalanta	
FW	Sergio Gori	Primavera	
FW	Joaquín Peiró	Torino	
MF	Bruno Bolchi	Hellas Verona	loan ended

Out
Pos.	Name	To	Type
DF	Sergio Codognato	Catania	
MF	Bruno Bolchi	Atalanta	
MF	Enea Masiero	Sampdoria	
MF	Horst Szymaniak	Varese	
MF	Franco Zaglio	Mantova	
FW	Nicola Ciccolo	Mantova	
FW	Beniamino Di Giacomo	Mantova	
FW	Bruno Petroni	Atalanta	

== Competitions ==
=== Serie A ===
Pos	Team	Pld	W	D	L	GF	GA	GD	Pts	Qualification or relegation
1	Internazionale (C)	34	22	10	2	68	29	+39	54	Qualification to European Cup
2	Milan	34	21	9	4	52	23	+29	51	Chosen for Inter-Cities Fairs Cup
3	Torino	34	16	12	6	48	27	+21	44	Chosen for Inter-Cities Fairs Cup
4	Fiorentina	34	16	9	9	52	37	+15	41	Chosen for Inter-Cities Fairs Cup
4	Juventus	34	15	11	8	43	24	+19	41	Qualification to Cup Winners' Cup

Source: Panini
(C) Champions

==== Results by round ====
Round	1	2	3	4	5	6	7	8	9	10	11	12	13	14	15	16	17	18	19	20	21	22	23	24	25	26	27	28	29	30	31	32	33	34
Ground	A	H	A	H	A	H	A	H	A	A	H	H	A	H	H	A	A	H	A	A	H	H	A	H	A	H	H	A	A	H	A	A	H	H
Result	D	W	D	W	W	D	W	W	L	D	W	W	D	D	W	W	D	D	L	W	W	W	W	W	W	W	W	D	W	W	W	W	W	D
Position	6	2	7	1	1	3	2	2	2	2	2	2	2	2	2	2	2	2	2	2	2	2	2	2	2	2	1	2	2	2	1	1	1	1

Source: Competitive matches
A = Away; H = Home; W = Win; D = Draw; L = Loss; = Leader, 1965-66 European Cup; = 1965–66 Inter-Cities Fairs Cup

==== Matches ====
13 September 1964 1	Varese	0–0	Inter Milan	Varese
		Report		Stadium: Stadio Franco Ossola; Referee: Alessandro D'Agostini

19 September 1964 2	Inter Milan	2–0	Foggia	Milan
	Suárez 21' (pen.); Mazzola 62'	Report		Stadium: San Siro; Referee: Luciano Politano

4 October 1964 4	SS Lazio	1–1	Inter Milan	Rome
	Renna 8'	Report	66' Domenghini	Stadium: Olimpico; Referee: Lo Bello

7 October 1964 3.	Inter Milan	3–1	ACR Messina	Milan
	Jair 19'; Domenghini 60'; Corso 76'	Report	46' Morelli	Stadium: San Siro; Referee: Di Tonno

11 October 1964 5	Genoa	1–2	Inter Milan	Genoa
	Kölbl 52'	Report	39', 48' Jair	Stadium: Luigi Ferraris; Referee: Francesco Francescon

18 October 1964 6	Inter Milan	0–0	Roma	Milan
		Report		Stadium: San Siro; Referee: Aurelio Angonese

25 October 1964 7	Cagliari	0–2	Inter Milan	Cagliari
		Report	67' Mazzola; 86' Jair	Stadium: Amsicora; Referee: Antonio Sbardella

8 November 1964 8	Inter Milan	1–0	Mantova	Milan
	Cancian 36' (o.g.)	Report		Stadium: San Siro; Referee: Mario Bernardis

15 November 1964 9	AC Milan	3–0	Inter Milan	Milan
	Lodetti 5', 63'; Amarildo 88'	Report		Stadium: San Siro; Referee: Concetto Lo Bello

22 November 1964 10	Bologna	0–0	Inter Milan	Bologna
		Report		Stadium: Comunale; Referee: Bruno De Marchi

29 November 1964 11	Inter Milan	3–2	Vicenza	Milan
	Suárez 5'; Stenti 36' (o.g.); Corso 45'	Report	19' De Marchi; 86' Vinicio	Stadium: San Siro; Referee: Antonio Di Tonno

13 December 1964 12	Inter Milan	3–2	Sampdoria	Milan
	Suárez 4'; Mazzola 26', 81'	Report	52', 77' da Silva	Stadium: San Siro; Referee: Francesco De Robbio

20 December 1964 13	Fiorentina	2–2	Inter Milan	Florence
	Maschio 74', 85'	Report	48' Corso; 71' Mazzola	Stadium: Comunale; Referee: Bruno De Marchi

27 December 1964 14	Inter Milan	1–1	Juventus	Milan
	Jair 50'	Report	57' Mazzia	Stadium: San Siro; Referee: Antonio Sbardella

3 January 1965 15	Inter Milan	1–0	Atalanta	Milan
	Mazzola 8'	Report		Stadium: San Siro; Referee: Alessandro D'Agostini

10 January 1965 16	Catania	2–3	Inter Milan	Catania
	Calvanese 46'; Facchin 77'	Report	12' Suárez; 18' Mazzola; 79' Facchetti	Stadium: Cibali; Referee: Antonio Sbardella

17 January 1965 17	Torino	0–0	Inter Milan	Turin
		Report		Stadium: Comunale; Referee: Concetto Lo Bello

24 January 1965 18	Inter Milan	0–0	Varese	Milan
		Report		Stadium: San Siro; Referee: Francesco De Robbio

31 January 1965 19	Foggia	3–2	Inter Milan	Foggia
	Lazzotti 47'; Nocera 54', 78'	Report	63' Peiró; 65' Suárez	Stadium: Pino Zaccheria; Referee: Francesco Francescon

7 February 1965 20	ACR Messina	0–1	Inter Milan	Messina
		Report	40' Peiró	Stadium: Giovanni Celeste; Referee: Alessandro D'Agostini

14 February 1965 21	Inter Milan	3–0	Lazio	Milan
	Peiró 31', 76'; Domenghini 47'	Report		Stadium: San Siro; Referee: Priamo Varazzani

21 February 1965 22	Inter Milan	4–1	Genoa	Milan
	Rivara 7' (o.g.); Mazzola 27', 55'; Corso 57'	Report	81' Dal Monte	Stadium: San Siro; Referee: Aurelio Angonese

28 February 1965 23	Roma	1–3	Inter Milan	Roma
	Manfredini 22'	Report	10' Jair; 41', 53' Domenghini	Stadium: Olimpico; Referee: Concetto Lo Bello

7 March 1965 24	Inter Milan	3–0	Cagliari	Milan
	Suárez 16', 26'; Bedin 88'	Report		Stadium: San Siro; Referee: Mario Bernardis

21 March 1965 25	Mantova	0–1	Inter Milan	Mantova
		Report	73' Domenghini	Stadium: Danilo Martelli; Referee: Alessandro D'Agostini

28 March 1965 26	Inter Milan	5–2	AC Milan	Milan
	Jair 5'; Domenghini 68'; Corso 73'; Mazzola 81', 84'	Report	17', 75' Amarildo	Stadium: San Siro; Referee: Antonio Sbardella

4 April 1965 27	Inter Milan	2–0	Bologna	Milan
	Corso 44'; Bedin 68'	Report		Stadium: San Siro; Referee: Francesco Francescon

11 April 1965 28	Vicenza	1–1	Inter Milan	Vicenza
	Dell'Angelo 88'	Report	30' Mazzola	Stadium: Romeo Menti; Referee: Alessandro D'Agostini

25 April 1965 29	Sampdoria	0–1	Inter Milan	Genoa
		Report	43' (o.g.) Sormani	Stadium: Luigi Ferraris; Referee: Concetto Lo Bello

8 May 1965 30	Inter Milan	6–2	Fiorentina	Milan
	Corso 2', 17'; Mazzola 35', 58'; Burgnich 48'; Jair 70'	Report	44' Maschio; 59' Bertini	Stadium: San Siro; Referee: Aurelio Angonese

16 May 1965 31	Juventus	0–2	Inter Milan	Turin
		Report	9' Suárez; 83' Gori	Stadium: Comunale; Referee: Antonio Sbardella

23 May 1965 32	Atalanta	1–3	Inter Milan	Bergamo
	Nova 60'	Report	32' Facchetti; 34' Domenghini; 81' Mazzola	Stadium: Comunale; Referee: Alessandro D'Agostini

1 June 1965 33	Inter Milan	5–1	Catania	Milan
	Mazzola 12'; Bedin 13', 48'; Jair 36'; Domenghini 72'	Report	2' Rozzoni	Stadium: San Siro; Referee: De Robbio

6 June 1965 34	Inter Milan	2–2	Torino	Milan
	Jair 38'; Mazzola 90' (pen.)	Report	48' Simoni; 52' Ferrini	Stadium: San Siro; Referee: Antonio Sbardella

=== Coppa Italia ===
28 April 1965 Quarter-final	Inter Milan	6–3 (a.e.t.)	Cagliari	Milan
	Jair 15'; Corso 39'; Gori 92', 94'; Suarez 110'; Peiro 116'		31' Rizzo; 87', 99' Riva	Stadium: San Siro; Referee: Priamo Varazzani

9 June 1965 Semi-final	Roma	2–2 (a.e.t.) (4–6 p)	Inter Milan	Rome
	Manfredini 22' (pen.); Francesconi 29'		50' Bedin; 56' Jair	Stadium: Olimpico; Referee: Bruno De Marchi

29 August 1965 Final	Inter Milan	0–1	Juventus	Rome
			14' Menichelli	Stadium: Olimpico; Referee: Alessandro D'Agostini

=== European Cup ===
11 November 1964 First round (first leg)	Inter (Italy)	6–0	(Romania) Dinamo Bucharest	Milan
	Jair 12', 35'; Mazzola 16', 78'; Suárez 38'; Milani 81'			Stadium: San Siro; Attendance: 20 376; Referee: (Spain) Arriba

3 December 1964 First round (second leg)	Dinamo Bucharest (Romania)	0–1	(Italy) Inter	Bucharest
			57' Domenghini	Stadium: Stadionul Dinamo; Attendance: 33 741; Referee: (Austria) Wlachojanis

17 February 1965 Quarter-final (first leg)	Inter (Italy)	3–1	(Scotland) Rangers	Milan
	Suárez 48'; Peirò 50', 51'		64' Forrest	Stadium: San Siro; Attendance: 49 520; Referee: (Czech Republic) Huber

3 March 1965 Quarter-final (second leg)	Rangers (Scotland)	1–0	(Italy) Inter	Glasgow
	Forrest 7'			Stadium: Ibrox Stadium; Attendance: 78 872; Referee: (West Germany) Kurt Tschenscher

4 May 1965 Semi-final (first leg)	Liverpool (England)	3–1	(Italy) Inter	Liverpool
	Hunt 7'; Callaghan 33'; St. John 74'		10' Mazzola	Stadium: Anfield; Attendance: 54 082; Referee: (Austria) Kainer

12 May 1965 Semi-final (second leg)	Inter (Italy)	3–0	(England) Liverpool	Milan
	Corso 8'; Peirò 9'; Facchetti 62'			Stadium: San Siro; Attendance: 76 601; Referee: (Spain) Ortiz De Mendibil

27 May 1965 Final	Inter (Italy)	1–0	(Portugal) Benfica	Milan
	Jair 42'			Stadium: San Siro; Attendance: 89 000; Referee: (Czech Republic) Gottfried Dienst

=== Intercontinental Cup ===
9 September 1964 First leg	Independiente (Argentina)	1–0	(Italy) Inter Milan	Avellaneda
	Rodríguez 59'	Report		Stadium: Independiente Stadium; Attendance: 65,000; Referee: (Brazil) Armando Marques

23 September 1964 Second leg	Inter Milan (Italy)	2–0	(Argentina) Independiente	Milan
	Mazzola 8'; Corso 34'	Report		Stadium: San Siro; Attendance: 50,164; Referee: (Hungary) Gyula Gere

26 September 1964 Playoff	Inter Milan (Italy)	1–0 (a.e.t.)	(Argentina) Independiente	Madrid
	Corso 110'	Report		Stadium: Santiago Bernabéu; Attendance: 25,000; Referee: (Spain) José María Ortiz de Mendíbil

== Statistics ==
=== Players statistics ===
No.	Pos	Nat	Player	Total		1964-65 Serie A	
No.	Pos	Nat	Player	Apps	Goals	Apps	Goals
	GK	(Italy) ITA	Giuliano Sarti	25	-19	25	-19
	DF	(Italy) ITA	Tarcisio Burgnich	31	1	31	1
	DF	(Italy) ITA	Aristide Guarneri	31	0	31	0
	DF	(Italy) ITA	Armando Picchi	28	0	28	0
	DF	(Italy) ITA	Giacinto Facchetti	32	2	32	2
	MF	(Italy) ITA	Mario Corso	30	8	30	8
	MF	(Spain) ESP	Luis Suárez	29	8	29	8
	MF	(Italy) ITA	Carlo Tagnin	16	0	16	0
	FW	(Italy) ITA	Sandro Mazzola	33	17	33	17
	FW	(Italy) ITA	Angelo Domenghini	26	9	26	9
	FW	(Brazil) BRA	Jair	19	10	19	10
	GK	(Italy) ITA	Ottavio Bugatti	6	-7	6	-7
	GK	(Italy) ITA	Rosario Di Vincenzo	3	-3	3	-3
	DF	(Italy) ITA	Giorgio Dellagiovanna	1	0	1	0
	DF	(Italy) ITA	Spartaco Landini	2	0	2	0
	MF	(Italy) ITA	Gianfranco Bedin	14	4	14	4
	MF	(Italy) ITA	Sergio Gori	4	1	4	1
	DF	(Italy) ITA	Saul Malatrasi	15	0	15	0
	FW	(Italy) ITA	Francesco Canella	3	0	3	0
	FW	(Italy) ITA	Aurelio Milani	11	0	11	0
	FW	(Spain) ESP	Joaquín Peiró	15	4	15	4

- Source: http://calcio-seriea.net/presenze/1964/589/

== See also ==
- History of Grande Inter
