= 1963–64 Inter Milan season =

Football Club Internazionale
1963–64 season
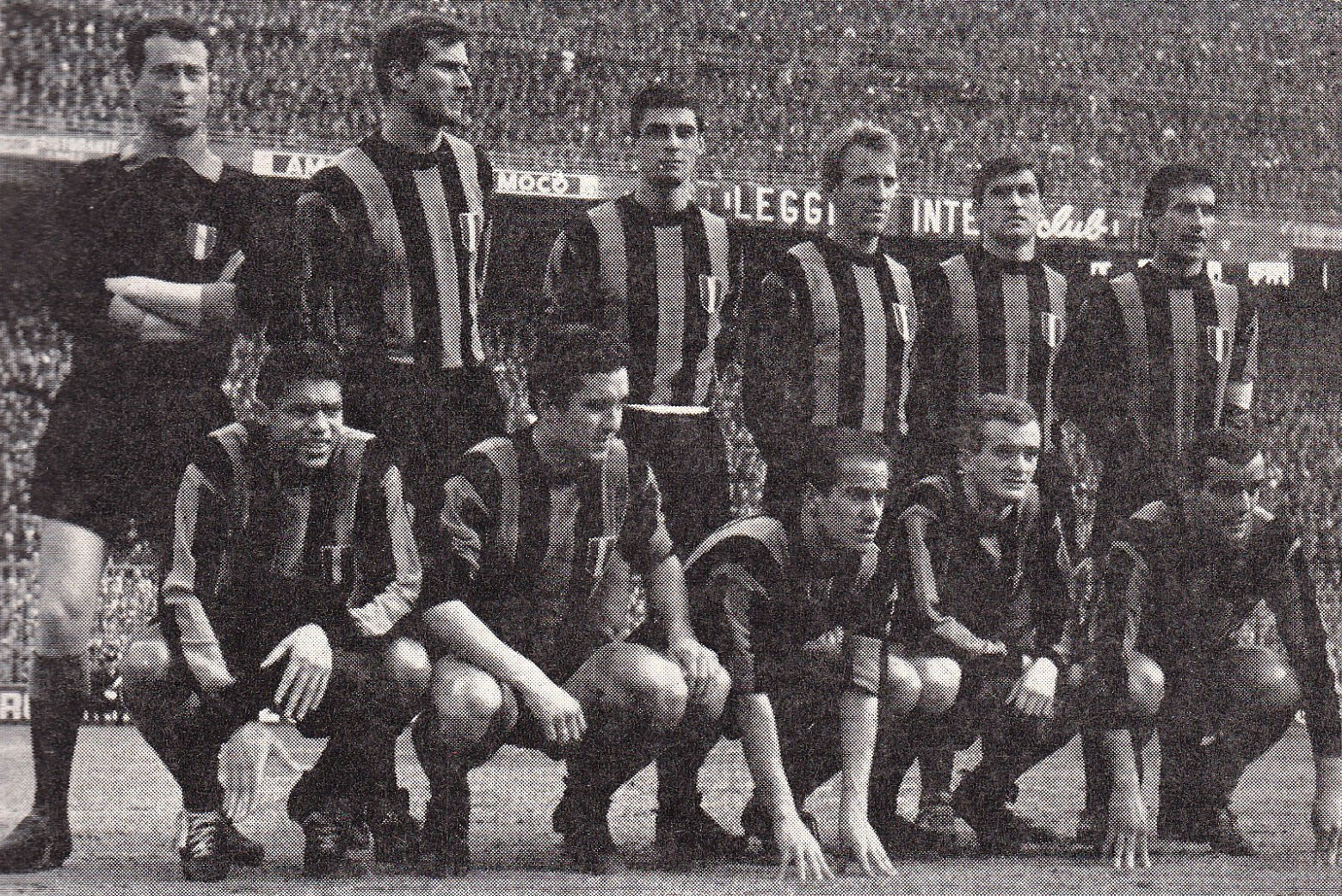
- 1963–64 Inter Milan team at the San Siro Stadium
- President: Angelo Moratti
- Manager: Helenio Herrera
- Stadium: San Siro
- Serie A: 2nd
- European Cup: Winners (in European Cup)
- Coppa Italia: Quarter-final
- Top goalscorer: League: Jair (12); All: Jair, Mazzola (16)
- Biggest win: 5–1 (vs Sampdoria, 1 March 1964); 4–0 (vs Messina, 5 April 1964)
- Biggest defeat: 1–4 (vs Juventus, 22 December 1963); 1–4 (vs Torino, 11 June 1964)
Home colours	Away colours

== Season ==
Inter made their debut in the European Cup, due to the Scudetto won last year. Their first match was in Everton, resulting in a goalless draw. Jair, in the retour match, became the first scorer of the club in this competition. In the following rounds, Inter beat in order: Monaco (4–1 aggregate), Partizan Beograd (4–1) and Borussia Dortmund (4–2).

In the final, Inter faced off with Real Madrid who had defeated AC Milan (qualified as the reigning champion) in the quarter-finals. Some key men of the Spanish side, like Puskás and Di Stéfano, were about to turn 40 years old but had still wishes to win. Near the end of the first half, Sandro Mazzola scored with a shot from 25 metres. During the second half, Milani scored the goal to go up by two after Vicente's mistake. Felo marked the only point for Real Madrid, before Mazzola signed the final 3–1. Inter won the trophy in its first attempt, conquering – at the same time – its first European honour. Four days later, Inter ended the domestic league equal with Bologna at 54 points. It led, for the only time in Serie A history, to a tie-break for the awarding of the Italian title: Bologna won 2–0, qualifying for the 1964–65 European Cup, in which Inter was admitted as defending champion.

== Squad ==
Squad at the end of the season.

Note: Flags indicate national team as defined under FIFA eligibility rules; some limited exceptions apply. Players may hold more than one non-FIFA nationality.

Pos.	Nation	Player
GK	ITA	Ottavio Bugatti
DF	ITA	Tarcisio Burgnich
FW	ITA	Renato Cappellini
FW	ITA	Nicola Ciccolo
DF	ITA	Sergio Codognato
MF	ITA	Mario Corso
FW	BRA	Jair
FW	ITA	Beniamino Di Giacomo
DF	ITA	Giacinto Facchetti
DF	ITA	Aristide Guarneri

Pos.	Nation	Player
DF	ITA	Spartaco Landini
MF	ITA	Enea Masiero
MF	ITA	Sandro Mazzola
FW	ITA	Aurelio Milani
FW	ITA	Bruno Petroni
DF	ITA	Armando Picchi
GK	ITA	Giuliano Sarti
MF	ESP	Luis Suárez
MF	FRG	Horst Szymaniak
MF	ITA	Carlo Tagnin
DF	ITA	Franco Zaglio

=== Transfers ===
In
Pos.	Name	from	Type
GK	Giuliano Sarti	Fiorentina	
DF	Sergio Codognato		
DF	Spartaco Landini		
FW	Horst Szymaniak	Catania	
FW	Renato Cappellini		
FW	Nicola Ciccolo	Hellas Verona	
FW	Bruno Petroni	Catania	

Out
Pos.	Name	To	Type
GK	Lorenzo Buffon	Fiorentina	
FW	Lorenzo Bettini	Modena	
FW	Gerry Hitchens	Torino	
FW	Humberto Maschio	Fiorentina	

== Competitions ==
=== Serie A ===
==== League table ====
Pos	Team	Pld	W	D	L	GF	GA	GD	Pts	Qualification or relegation
1	Bologna (C)	34	22	10	2	54	18	+36	54	Qualification to European Cup (Note: Inter qualified as defending champions.)
2	Internazionale (Note: After the title tie-breaker with Bologna (2–0).)	34	23	8	3	54	21	+33	54	Qualification to European Cup
3	Milan	34	21	9	4	58	28	+30	51	Chosen for Inter-Cities Fairs Cup
4	Fiorentina	34	14	10	10	43	27	+16	38	Chosen for Inter-Cities Fairs Cup
4	Juventus	34	14	10	10	49	37	+12	38	Chosen for Inter-Cities Fairs Cup

Source: Panini
(C) Champions

==== Results by round ====
Round	1	2	3	4	5	6	7	8	9	10	11	12	13	14	15	16	17	18	19	20	21	22	23	24	25	26	27	28	29	30	31	32	33	34	35
Ground	H	A	H	A	H	A	A	H	H	A	A	H	A	H	A	H	H	H	A	A	A	H	A	H	H	A	A	H	H	A	H	A	A	H	A
Result	W	L	W	W	W	D	W	W	D	W	W	D	L	W	W	L	W	D	W	W	D	D	W	W	W	D	W	W	W	W	W	D	W	W	L
Position	1	6	1	1	1	1	1	3	2	1	1	2	2	2	1	3	2	3	3	3	3	3	2	2	2	2	2	2	2	2	2	2	2	2	2

Source: Competitive matches
A = Away; H = Home; W = Win; D = Draw; L = Loss; = Leader, 1964-65 European Cup; = 1964–65 Inter-Cities Fairs Cup

==== Matches ====
15 September 1963 1	Inter Milan	2–1	Modena	Milan
	Di Giacomo 16', 69'	Report	23' Conti	Stadium: San Siro

22 September 1963 2	Lanerossi Vicenza	1–0	Inter	Vicenza
	Vinicio 32'	Report

29 September 1963 4	Inter Milan	2–0	Mantova	Milan
	Jair 10', 17'	Report		Stadium: San Siro

6 October 1963 5	SPAL	0–1	Inter	Ferrara
		Report	37' Tagnin

20 October 1963 6	Inter Milan	1–0	Sampdoria	Milan
	Jair 61'	Report		Stadium: San Siro

23 October 1963 7	Bari	1–1	Inter Milan	Bari
	Gianmarinaro 14'	Report	74' Mazzola

27 October 1963 8	Roma	0–1	Inter Milan	Rome
		Report	6' Jair

13 November 1963 3	Inter Milan	3–1	Torino	Milan
	Ciccolo 38'; Corso 41' (pen.); Cella 71' (o.g.)	Report	83' Hitchens

17 November 1963 10	Inter Milan	0–0	Bologna	Milan
		Report		Stadium: San Siro

24 November 1963 11	ACR Messina	0–1	Inter Milan	Messina
		Report	44' Facchetti

1 December 1963 12	Catania	1–2	Inter Milan	Catania
	Fanello 89'	Report	20' Facchetti; 65' Ciccolo

8 December 1963 13	Inter Milan	1–1	Fiorentina	Milan
	Jair 31'	Report	37' Pirovano	Stadium: San Siro

22 December 1963 14	Juventus	4–1	Inter Milan	Turin
	Sarti 20' (o.g.); Del Sol 39', 41'; Menichelli 90'	Report	4' Milani

8 January 1964 15	Inter Milan	1–0	Lazio	Milan
	Suárez 64'	Report		Stadium: San Siro

12 January 1964 17	Atalanta	1–3	Inter	Bergamo
	Nova 15'	Report	61', 73' Milani; 84' Jair

19 January 1964 9	Inter Milan	0–2	AC Milan	Milan
		Report	13' Fortunato; 35' Rivera	Stadium: San Siro

29 January 1964 16	Inter Milan	1–0	Genoa	Milan
	Milani 21'	Report		Stadium: San Siro

2 February 1964 19	Inter Milan	0–0	Lanerossi Vicenza	Milan
		Report		Stadium: San Siro

9 February 1964 20	Torino	0–2	Inter Milan	Turin
		Report	7' Jair; 59' Mazzola

12 February 1964 18	Modena	0–1	Inter	Modena
		Report	18' Facchetti

16 February 1964 21	Mantova	2–2	Inter	Mantova
	Picchi 24' (o.g.); Jonsson 89'	Report	15' Jair; 79' Milani

23 February 1964 22	Inter Milan	0–0	SPAL	Milan
		Report		Stadium: San Siro

1 March 1964 23	Sampdoria	1–5	Inter Milan	Genoa
	Barison 14'	Report	9', 25' Mazzola; 11' Facchetti; 13', 27' (pen.) Suárez

8 March 1964 24	Inter Milan	3–0	Bari	Milan
	Mazzola 38'; Petroni 46'; Guarneri 51'	Report		Stadium: San Siro

15 March 1964 25	Inter Milan	1–0	Roma	Milan
	Milani 38'	Report		Stadium: San Siro

22 March 1964 26	AC Milan	1–1	Inter Milan	Milan
	Altafini 60'	Report	61' Corso	Stadium: San Siro

29 March 1964 27	Bologna	1–2	Inter Milan	Bologna
	Furlanis 76'	Report	19' Corso; 49' Jair

5 April 1964 28	Inter Milan	4–0	ACR Messina	Milan
	Jair 28', 62'; Ciccolo 68'; Clerici 75' (o.g.)	Report		Stadium: San Siro

19 April 1964 29	Inter Milan	4–1	Catania	Milan
	Petroni 43', 50'; Mazzola 54'; Ciccolo 83'	Report	35' Battaglia	Stadium: San Siro

25 April 1964 30	Fiorentina	1–3	Inter Milan	Florence
	Seminario 77'	Report	17', 30' Mazzola; 84' Corso

3 May 1964 31	Inter Milan	1–0	Juventus	Milan
	Milani 47'	Report		Stadium: San Siro

17 May 1964 32	Lazio	0–0	Inter Milan	Rome
		Report

23 May 1964 33	Genoa	0–2	Inter Milan	Genoa
		Report	57' Corso; 90' Mazzola

31 May 1964 34	Inter Milan	2–1	Atalanta	Milan
	Corso 1'; Jair 68'	Report	71' Nova	Stadium: San Siro

==== Title play-off ====
7 June 1964	Bologna	2–0	Inter Milan	Rome
	Facchetti 75' (o.g.); Nielsen 84'			Stadium: Stadio Olimpico; Referee: Lo Bello

=== European Cup ===
==== Round of 32 ====
18 September 1963 1	Everton (England)	0–0	(Italy) Inter Milan	Liverpool
19:30 BST		Report		Stadium: Goodison Park; Attendance: 62,408; Referee: (Hungary) Gyula Gere

25 September 1963 2	Inter Milan (Italy)	1–0	(England) Everton	Milan
20:00 CET	Jair 47'	Report		Stadium: San Siro; Attendance: 59,128; Referee: (Hungary) Lajos Horváth

==== Round of 16 ====
27 November 1963 1	Inter Milan (Italy)	1–0	(France) Monaco	Milan
21:15 CET	Ciccolo 68'	Report		Stadium: San Siro; Attendance: 15,366; Referee: (West Germany) Rudolf Kreitlein

4 December 1963 2	Monaco (France)	1–3	(Italy) Inter Milan	Marseille
15:00 CET	Szkudlapski 57' (pen.)	Report	13', 17' Mazzola; 90' Suárez	Stadium: Stade Vélodrome; Attendance: 25,080; Referee: (Spain) José María Ortiz de Mendíbil

==== Quarterfinals ====
26 February 1964 1	Partizan (Socialist Federal Republic of Yugoslavia)	0–2	(Italy) Inter Milan	Belgrade
15:00 CET		Report	48' Jair; 89' Mazzola	Stadium: Stadio Partizan; Attendance: 19,509; Referee: (Austria) Stoll

4 March 1964 2	Inter Milan (Italy)	2–1	(Socialist Federal Republic of Yugoslavia) Partizan	Milan
15:30 CET	Corso 25'; Jair 42'	Report	68' Bajić	Stadium: San Siro; Attendance: 32,100; Referee: (West Germany) Kurt Tschenscher

==== Semifinals ====
15 April 1964 1	Borussia Dortmund (West Germany)	2–2	(Italy) Inter Milan	Dortmund
19:30 CET	Brungs 23', 28'	Report	4' Mazzola; 41' Corso	Stadium: Stadion Rote Erde; Attendance: 42,356; Referee: (Hungary) Jenő Gere

29 April 1964 2	Inter Milan (Italy)	2–0	(West Germany) Borussia Dortmund	Milan
21:15 CET	Mazzola 48'; Jair 75'	Report		Stadium: San Siro; Attendance: 76,788; Referee: (Socialist Federal Republic of Yugoslavia) Branko Tešanić

==== Final ====
27 May 1964	Inter Milan (Italy)	3–1	(Spain) Real Madrid	Wien
19:30 CET	Mazzola 43', 77'; Milani 61'	Report	70' Felo	Stadium: Praterstadion; Attendance: 71,333; Referee: (Austria) Josef Stoll

== Statistics ==
=== Players statistics ===
No.	Pos	Nat	Player	Total		Serie A		Coppa Italia		European Cup	
No.	Pos	Nat	Player	Apps	Goals	Apps	Goals	Apps	Goals	Apps	Goals
	GK	(Italy) ITA	Giuliano Sarti	39	-26	30	-21	0	-0	9	-5
	DF	(Italy) ITA	Tarcisio Burgnich	42	0	33	0	0	0	9	0
	DF	(Italy) ITA	Aristide Guarneri	41	1	32	1	0	0	9	0
	DF	(Italy) ITA	Armando Picchi	37	0	28	0	0	0	9	0
	DF	(Italy) ITA	Giacinto Facchetti	41	4	32	4	0	0	9	0
	MF	(Italy) ITA	Mario Corso	33	8	28	6	0	0	5	2
	MF	(Italy) ITA	Sandro Mazzola	38	16	29	9	0	0	9	7
	MF	(Spain) ESP	Luis Suarez	35	4	26	3	0	0	9	1
	MF	(Italy) ITA	Carlo Tagnin	30	1	20	1	1	0	9	0
	FW	(Brazil) BRA	Jair da Costa	40	16	30	12	1	0	9	4
	FW	(Italy) ITA	Aurelio Milani	22	8	18	7	1	0	3	1
	GK	(Italy) ITA	Ottavio Bugatti	5	-4	4	0	1	-4	0	-0
	FW	(Italy) ITA	Bruno Petroni	10	3	10	3	0	0	0	0
	FW	(Italy) ITA	Nicola Ciccolo	13	6	10	4	1	1	2	1
	FW	(Italy) ITA	Beniamino Di Giacomo	13	2	10	2	0	0	3	0
	MF	(Italy) ITA	Franco Zaglio	9	0	9	0	0	0	0	0
	MF	(Italy) ITA	Enea Masiero	9	0	8	0	1	0	0	0
	MF	(Germany) GER	Horst Szymaniak	12	0	6	0	1	0	5	0
	FW	(Italy) ITA	Renato Cappellini	5	0	4	0	1	0	0	0
	DF	(Italy) ITA	Sergio Codognato	4	0	3	0	1	0	0	0
	MF	(Italy) ITA	Bruno Bolchi	2	0	2	0	0	0	0	0
	DF	(Italy) ITA	Spartaco Landini	3	0	2	0	1	0	0	0
	DF	(Italy) ITA	G. Bedin	1	0	0	0	1	0	0	0

- Source: http://calcio-seriea.net/presenze/1963/560/

== See also ==
- History of Grande Inter
