= 1962–63 Inter Milan season =

Football Club Internazionale
1962–63 season
- Chairman: Angelo Moratti
- Manager: Helenio Herrera
- Stadium: San Siro
- Serie A: 1st (in European Cup)
- Coppa Italia: Round of 16
- Top goalscorer: League: Di Giacomo, Mazzola (11); All: Di Giacomo, Mazzola (11)
Home colours	Away colours

During the 1962-63 season Football Club Internazionale Milano competed in Serie A and Coppa Italia.

== Summary ==
Prior to the 1962–63 season, Helenio Herrera was confirmed despite a doping scandal. The main signing was Jair, signed after the World Cup from the Brazilian team.

Inter suffered a very poor start to the season: the side collected just seven points in the first seven games, winning only twice before beating six of eight of the next opponents. In early January they moved into second place, a point behind Juventus. The second half of the season marked a clear comeback, with 21 points earned until late April. With three games left, Inter won away due to Mazzola's goal: the next week Inter lost 3–0 by Roma, but stayed in first placed, due to Juventus' draw in Mantua. Inter ended with 49 points, four over Juventus and six over AC Milan. It was the first national title under Angelo Moratti's leadership, and the first in 10 years since 1952–53.

== Squad ==
Note: Flags indicate national team as defined under FIFA eligibility rules; some limited exceptions apply. Players may hold more than one non-FIFA nationality.

Pos.	Nation	Player
GK	ITA	Lorenzo Buffon
GK	ITA	Ottavio Bugatti
GK	ITA	Giovanni Ferretti
DF	ITA	Bruno Bolchi
DF	ITA	Tarcisio Burgnich
DF	ITA	Giacinto Facchetti
DF	ITA	Aristide Guarneri
DF	ITA	Spartaco Landini
DF	ITA	Armando Picchi
MF	ITA	Mario Corso

Pos.	Nation	Player
MF	ITA	Enea Masiero
MF	ARG	Humberto Maschio
MF	ITA	Sandro Mazzola
MF	ESP	Luis Suárez
MF	ITA	Carlo Tagnin
MF	ITA	Franco Zaglio
FW	ITA	Mauro Bicicli
FW	ITA	Beniamino Di Giacomo
FW	BRA	Jair

=== Transfers ===
In
Pos.	Name	from	Type
FW	Jair	Portuguesa	
DF	Tarcisio Burgnich	Palermo	
GK	Giovanni Ferretti	Reggiana	
MF	Humberto Maschio	Atalanta	
MF	Carlo Tagnin	Bari	
FW	Beniamino Di Giacomo	Torino	

Out
Pos.	Name	To	Type
MF	Giorgio Dellagiovanna	Brescia	loan
FW	Lorenzo Bettini	Modena	
FW	Gerry Hitchens	Torino	

== Competitions ==
=== Serie A ===
==== League table ====
Pos	Team	Pld	W	D	L	GF	GA	GD	Pts	Qualification or relegation
1	Internazionale (C)	34	19	11	4	56	20	+36	49	Qualification to European Cup
2	Juventus	34	18	9	7	50	25	+25	45	Chosen for Inter-Cities Fairs Cup
3	Milan	34	15	13	6	53	27	+26	43	Qualification to European Cup (Note: Qualified as defending champions)
4	Bologna	34	17	8	9	58	39	+19	42	
5	Roma	34	13	14	7	57	32	+25	40	Chosen for Inter-Cities Fairs Cup

Source: Panini
(C) Champions

==== Results by round ====
Round	1	2	3	4	5	6	7	8	9	10	11	12	13	14	15	16	17	18	19	20	21	22	23	24	25	26	27	28	29	30	31	32	33	34
Ground	A	H	A	A	H	A	H	A	H	H	A	H	A	H	H	A	A	H	A	H	H	A	H	A	H	A	A	H	A	H	A	A	H	H
Result	D	W	L	D	W	D	L	W	W	W	D	W	W	W	W	D	D	W	W	W	W	W	D	L	W	W	D	W	D	W	W	L	D	D
Position	5	2	9	9	4	5	7	5	4	4	4	3	2	1	1	1	2	2	2	1	1	1	1	1	1	1	1	1	1	1	1	1	1	1

Source: Competitive matches
A = Away; H = Home; W = Win; D = Draw; L = Loss; = Leader, 1963-64 European Cup; = 1963–64 Inter-Cities Fairs Cup

==== Matches ====
16 September 1962 1	Mantova	0–0	Inter Milan	Mantua
		Report		Stadium: Stadio Danilo Martelli; Referee: Pietro Bonetto

23 September 1962 2	Inter Milan	1–0	Lanerossi Vicenza	Milan
	Corso 8'	Report		Stadium: San Siro; Referee: Sbardella

30 September 1962 3	Catania	1–0	Inter Milan	Catania
	Milan 63'	Report		Stadium: Stadio Cibali; Referee: Cesare Jonni

7 October 1962 4	Palermo	1–1	Inter Milan	Palermo
	Faustinho 76'	Report	51' Hitchens	Stadium: Stadio La Favorita; Referee: Bruno De Marchi

14 October 1962 5	Inter Milan	1–0	Napoli	Milan
	Maschio 79'	Report		Stadium: San Siro; Referee: Francesco Francescon

21 October 1962 6	AC Milan	1–1	Inter Milan	Milan
	Pivatelli 62'	Report	45' Maschio	Stadium: San Siro; Referee: Giuseppe Adami

28 October 1962 7	Inter Milan	1–2	Atalanta	Milan
	Mazzola 12'	Report	3' Da Costa; 65' Christensen	Stadium: San Siro; Referee: Bruno De Marchi

1 November 1962 8	Genoa	1–3	Inter Milan	Genoa
	Baveni 23'	Report	2' Jair; 42' Facchetti; 84' Di Giacomo	Stadium: Stadio Luigi Ferraris; Referee: Gennaro Marchese

4 November 1962 9	Inter Milan	2–0	Venezia	Milan
	Jair 66'; Corso 83'	Report		Stadium: San Siro; Referee: Concetto Lo Bello

18 November 1962 10	Inter Milan	4–0	Sampdoria	Milan
	Di Giacomo 1', 84'; Mazzola 62'; Jair 77'	Report		Stadium: San Siro; Referee: Angonese

25 November 1962 11	Fiorentina	1–1	Inter Milan	Florence
	Petris 38'	Report	55' Suárez	Stadium: Stadio Artemio Franchi; Referee: Giuseppe Adami

9 December 1962 12	Inter Milan	3–2	SPAL	Milan
	Di Giacomo 24'; Suárez 31'; Mazzola 67'	Report	70' De Souza; 89' Micheli	Stadium: San Siro; Referee: Cesare Jonni

16 December 1962 13	Bologna	0–4	Inter Milan	Bologna
		Report	12', 74' Jair; 61' Maschio; 81' Corso	Stadium: Comunale; Referee: Lo Bello

23 December 1962 14	Inter Milan	1–0	Juventus	Milan
	Jair 49'	Report		Stadium: San Siro; Referee: Adami

30 December 1962 15	Inter Milan	2–0	Roma	Milan
	Mazzola 27'; Di Giacomo 71'	Report		Stadium: San Siro; Referee: De Marchi

6 January 1963 16	Modena	0–0	Inter Milan	Modena
		Report		Stadium: Stadio Alberto Braglia; Referee: Rigato

13 January 1963 17	Torino	1–1	Inter Milan	Turin
	Locatelli 42' (pen.)	Report	22' Di Giacomo	Stadium: Comunale; Referee: Jonni

20 January 1963 18	Inter Milan	1–0	Mantova	Milan
	Facchetti 22'	Report		Stadium: San Siro; Referee: Francescon

27 January 1963 19	Lanerossi Vicenza	1–2	Inter Milan	Vicenza
	Savoini 4'	Report	34' Di Giacomo; 43' Mazzola	Stadium: Stadio Romeo Menti; Referee: Sbardella

3 February 1963 20	Inter Milan	2–1	Catania	Milan
	Suárez 56' (pen.); Corso 75'	Report	80' Petroni	Stadium: San Siro; Referee: Gambarotta

10 February 1963 21	Inter Milan	4–0	Palermo	Milan
	Jair 11', 66'; Mazzola 71'; Corso 77'	Report		Stadium: San Siro; Referee: Antonio Di Tonno

17 February 1963 22	Napoli	1–5	Inter Milan	Naples
	Fraschini 64'	Report	6', 9', 59' Di Giacomo; 48' Suárez; 55' Corso	Stadium: San Paolo; Referee: Francesco Francescon

24 February 1963 23	Inter Milan	1–1	AC Milan	Milan
	Mazzola 1'	Report	78' Sani	Stadium: San Siro; Referee: Concetto Lo Bello

3 March 1963 24	Atalanta	1–0	Inter Milan	Bergamo
	Nielsen 5'	Report		Stadium: Stadio Atleti Azzurri d'Italia; Referee: Gennaro Marchese

10 March 1963 25	Inter Milan	6–0	Genoa	Milan
	Corso 11'; Maschio 50'; Suárez 55', 60' (pen.), 76'; Mazzola 65'	Report		Stadium: San Siro; Referee: Francesco Francescon

17 March 1963 26	Venezia	0–2	Inter Milan	Venice
		Report	57' Facchetti; 63' Corso	Stadium: Stadio Pier Luigi Penzo; Referee: Antonio Sbardella

31 March 1963 27	Sampdoria	0–0	Inter Milan	Genoa
		Report		Stadium: Stadio Luigi Ferraris; Referee: Lo Bello

7 April 1963 28	Inter Milan	1–0	Fiorentina	Milan
	Robotti 1' (o.g.)	Report		Stadium: San Siro; Referee: Carlo Gambarotta

14 April 1963 29	SPAL	0–0	Inter Milan	Ferrara
		Report		Stadium: Stadio Paolo Mazza; Referee: Francesco Francescon

21 April 1963 30	Inter Milan	4–1	Bologna	Milan
	Suárez 39'; Jair 46', 86'; Di Giacomo 81'	Report	5' (o.g.) Zaglio	Stadium: San Siro; Referee: Bruno De Marchi

28 April 1963 31	Juventus	0–1	Inter Milan	Turin
		Report	28' Mazzola	Stadium: Comunale; Referee: Antonio Sbardella

5 May 1963 32	Roma	3–0	Inter Milan	Rome
	Manfredini 28', 62' (pen.); Menichelli 76'	Report		Stadium: Olimpico; Referee: Concetto Lo Bello

19 May 1963 33	Inter Milan	0–0	Modena	Milan
		Report		Stadium: Stadio San Siro; Referee: Francesco Francescon

26 May 1963 34	Inter Milan	1–1	Torino	Milan
	Mazzola 56'	Report	61' Ferrini	Stadium: San Siro; Referee: Alessandro D'Agostini

=== Coppa Italia ===
==== First round ====
9 September 1962 1	Alessandria	0–5	Inter Milan	Alessandria
			10', 30' Bicicli; 14', 88' Maschio; 66' Hitchens	Stadium: Stadio Giuseppe Moccagatta; Referee: Carlo Gambarotta

==== Eightfinals ====
9 January 1963	Inter Milan	1–2	Calcio Padova	Milan
	Mazzola 52' (pen.)		7' Vomiero; 36' Cominato	Stadium: San Siro; Referee: Carlo Babini

== Statistics ==
=== Players statistics ===
No.	Pos	Nat	Player	Total		Serie A		Coppa Italia	
No.	Pos	Nat	Player	Apps	Goals	Apps	Goals	Apps	Goals
	GK	(Italy) ITA	Buffon	21	-11	20	-11	1	-0
	DF	(Italy) ITA	Burgnich	31	0	31	0	0	0
	DF	(Italy) ITA	Facchetti	33	4	31	4	2	0
	DF	(Italy) ITA	Guarneri	35	0	34	0	1	0
	DF	(Italy) ITA	Picchi	31	0	30	0	1	0
	MF	(Italy) ITA	Corso	31	8	30	8	1	0
	MF	(Italy) ITA	Mazzola	24	11	23	10	1	1
	MF	(Italy) ITA	Zaglio	21	0	21	0	0	0
	MF	(Spain) ESP	Luis Suarez	30	8	29	8	1	0
	FW	(Italy) ITA	Di Giacomo	24	11	24	11	0	0
	FW	(Brazil) BRA	Jair da Costa	27	10	27	10	0	0
	GK	(Italy) ITA	Bugatti	10	-5	10	-5	0	-0
	MF	(Argentina) ARG	Maschio	17	6	15	4	2	2
	DF	(Italy) ITA	Bolchi	14	0	12	0	2	0
	FW	(Italy) ITA	Bicicli	13	2	11	0	2	2
	MF	(Italy) ITA	Masiero	11	0	9	0	2	0
	FW	(England) ENG	Hitchens	6	2	5	1	1	1
	GK	(Italy) ITA	Ferretti	5	-6	4	-4	1	-2
	FW	(Italy) ITA	Morbello	5	0	4	0	1	0
	FW	(Italy) ITA	Bettini L.	2	0	2	0	0	0
	MF	(Italy) ITA	Tagnin	2	0	1	0	1	0
	MF	(Italy) ITA	Dellagiovanna	1	0	1	0	0	0
	DF	(Italy) ITA	Landini	1	0	0	0	1	0
	MF	(Italy) ITA	Pagani	1	0	0	0	1	0

- Source: http://calcio-seriea.net/presenze/1962/545/

== See also ==
- History of Grande Inter
