= Aurelio Milani =

Italian footballer (1934-2014)

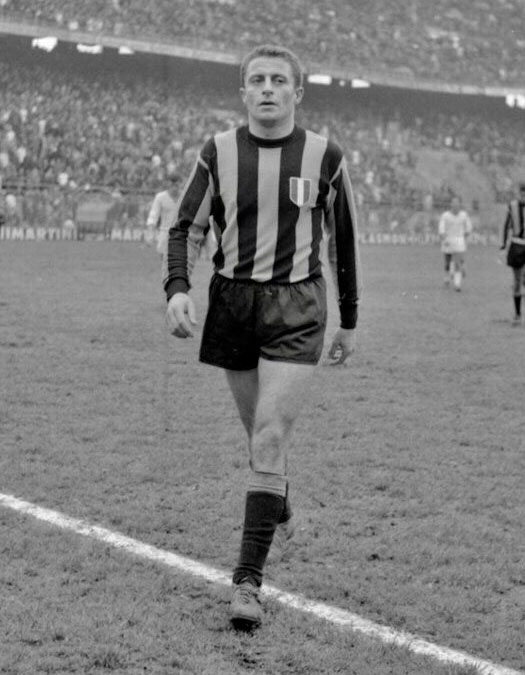
- Milani with Inter Milan in the 1963–64 season

Personal information
- Date of birth: 14 May 1934
- Place of birth: Desio, Italy
- Date of death: 25 November 2014 (aged 80)
- Place of death: Milan, Italy
- Height: 1.82 m (6 ft 0 in)
- Position: Forward

Youth career
- 1950–1952: Aurora Desio

Senior career*
| Years | Team | Apps | (Gls) |
| 1952–1953 | Atalanta | 0 | (0) |
| 1953–1955 | Fanfulla | 40 | (6) |
| 1955–1957 | Simmenthal-Monza | 64 | (37) |
| 1957–1958 | Triestina | 30 | (17) |
| 1958–1960 | Sampdoria | 44 | (14) |
| 1960–1961 | Padova | 33 | (18) |
| 1961–1963 | Fiorentina | 51 | (23) |
| 1963–1965 | Inter | 29 | (7) |
| 1966–1967 | Verbania | 8 | (1) |

International career
| 1964 | Italy | 1 | (0) |
- * Club domestic league appearances and goals

Aurelio Milani (Italian pronunciation: [auˈrɛːljo miˈlaːni]; 14 May 1934 – 25 November 2014) was an Italian footballer who played as a forward. Milani played for several different Italian clubs in Serie A and Serie B, winning the top scorer award in both divisions. In total, he collected 157 appearances in Serie A, scoring 62 goals, and 100 appearances in Serie B, scoring 54 goals. Milani is mostly remembered for his two seasons spent with Internazionale's Grande Inter side under manager Helenio Herrera. He was part of their European Cup victory in 1964, and with Inter, he also won the 1964–65 Serie A title, and the 1964 Intercontinental Cup. He also represented the Italy national side on one occasion.

Milani played as a centre-forward, with attributes such as accurate heading and shooting. He was also a team player, contributing to assists.

== Club career ==
=== Early years ===
Milani began his career playing for the Aurora Desio youth side at the beginning of the 1950s, before being scouted by Atalanta, who loaned him to Fanfulla during the 1953–54 Serie B season and the 1954–55 Serie C season. Simmenthal's Monza purchased him, which allowed him to play in Serie B again. With the club, he scored 37 times over two Serie B seasons, winning the Serie B top scorer award during the 1955–56 Serie B season. His impressive performances caught the eye of the Triestina management, and during the following season, Milani scored 17 goals in 30 Serie B appearances for the Friuli club.

=== Serie A debut ===
The following season, Milani made his Serie A debut with Sampdoria during the 1958–59 Serie A season, on 21 September 1958 in a 1–0 defeat against Lazio, in Rome. He formed a formidable attacking trio with Mora and Cucchiaroni throughout his first season, scoring 13 goals. During the 1959–60 Serie A season, however, he was injured to his leg in a match against Bologna, which prevented him from playing for a lengthy period.

=== Emergence in Serie A ===
Nereo Rocco took Milani to Padova, and the Italian striker formed a notable attacking partnership with Crippa, scoring 18 goals. In the summer of 1961, the president of Fiorentina, Longinotti, acquired Milani to strengthen his front-line, which featured the likes of Gianfranco Petris and Hamrin, who helped the team to capture the 1960–61 European Cup Winners' Cup and the Coppa Italia. In his first full season with the club, Milani initially went scoreless in Serie A for the first five matches, but on the sixth match-day of the 1961–62 Serie A season, on 24 September 1961, Milani scored two goals in a 5–2 home win over Udinese. This match is also remembered as being the debut of the legendary Italian goalkeeper Dino Zoff, therefore the first two goals that he conceded in his career were scored by Milani. With 22 goals, Milani finished the Serie A campaign as the joint Serie A topscorer, alongside Scudetto winner José Altafini, helping Fiorentina to a third-place finish in the league. Milani also helped Fiorentina to another European Cup Winners' Cup final that season.

=== Inter and later career ===
After a negative 1962–63 season, in which he managed to score only a single goal in 18 Serie A appearances for Fiorentina, Milani was purchased by Inter, becoming a member of what would later be known as Helenio Herrera's "Grande Inter" side. Milani had a successful season with the Milanese club, scoring 7 goals in 18 Serie A appearances, helping Inter to a second-place finish in Serie A, narrowly missing out on the title after a losing a playoff match against the eventual 1964 Serie A champions, Bologna, who were tied on points with Inter for first place after the season's conclusion. Milani also won the 1963–64 European Cup with Inter that season, and he scored a goal in the 1964 European Cup final against Real Madrid. The following season, he followed up this triumph by winning the 1964 Intercontinental Cup with Inter against Copa Libertadores winners Independiente. During the winter of 1964, however, Milani was seriously injured in a European Cup match against Dynamo Bucarest, after getting kneed in the back. As a result of the collision, one of his vertebrae was displaced, thus ending his career prematurely. During his second season at Inter, he was still able to win a second European Cup, and the Serie A title, despite only playing in 11 matches, also reaching the Coppa Italia final with Inter.

Milani did attempt to temporarily return to football during the 1966–67 season, playing for Verbania in the lower Italian divisions, in Serie C, for a single season, scoring 1 goal in 8 appearances, before officially retiring.

== International career ==
Milani only earned a single cap for the Italy national football team throughout his career. This occurred on 10 May 1964, in a 3–1 away defeat to Switzerland in an international friendly in Losanna.

== Death ==
At the age of 80, Milani died in Milan on 25 November 2014.

== Honours ==
=== Club ===
Inter

- Serie A: 1964–65
- European Cup: 1963–64, 1964–65
- Intercontinental Cup: 1964

Fiorentina

- European Cup Winners' Cup: 1961–62 runners-up

=== Individual ===
- Serie B Top Goalscorer: 1955–56
- Serie A Top Goalscorer: 1961–62

== Notes ==
Sporting positions
| Preceded by Sergio Brighenti | Serie A Top Scorer (Shared with José Altafini); 1961–62 | Succeeded by Harald Nielsen; Pedro Manfredini |
