= 1964 European Cup final =

- Match programme
- Event: 1963–64 European Cup
Inter Milan	Real Madrid
(Italy)	(Spain)
3	1
- Date: 27 May 1964
- Venue: Prater Stadium, Vienna
- Referee: Josef Stoll (Austria)
- Attendance: 71,333

The 1964 European Cup final was a football match played at the Prater Stadium in Vienna, Austria on 27 May 1964 as the conclusion to the 1963–64 European Cup.

The match was contested by Inter Milan of Italy and five-time former winners Real Madrid of Spain.

A brace from Sandro Mazzola alongside a goal from Aurelio Milani helped Inter Milan to a 3–1 victory as they won the trophy for the first time.

== Background ==
Real Madrid had won the first five editions of the European Cup in 1956, 1957, 1958, 1959 and 1960. They had also made the final in 1962 but lost to Benfica.

Inter Milan, who had never previously qualified for the European Cup, reached the final at the first attempt.

== Route to the final ==
(Italy) Inter Milan				Round	(Spain) Real Madrid			
Opponent	Agg.	1st leg	2nd leg		Opponent	Agg.	1st leg	2nd leg
(England) Everton	1–0	0–0 (A)	1–0 (H)	Prelim. round	(Scotland) Rangers	7–0	1–0 (A)	6–0 (H)
(France) Monaco	4–1	1–0 (H)	3–1 (A)	First round	(Romania) Dinamo București	8–4	3–1 (A)	5–3 (H)
(Socialist Federal Republic of Yugoslavia) Partizan	4–1	2–0 (A)	2–1 (H)	Quarter-finals	(Italy) Milan	4–3	4–1 (H)	0–2 (A)
(West Germany) Borussia Dortmund	4–2	2–2 (A)	2–0 (H)	Semi-finals	(Switzerland) Zürich	8–1	2–1 (A)	6–0 (H)

=== Inter Milan ===
Inter Milan qualified for the competition as winners of the 1962–63 Serie A.

Everton of England were Inter Milan's opponents in the preliminary round. After a goalless draw away from home in the first leg, Inter Milan won the second leg 1–0 at home to advance.

In the first round, Inter Milan faced AS Monaco who represented France in the competition. Inter Milan won the first leg 1–0 at home and the second leg 3–1 away to advance 4–1 on aggregate.

Inter Milan then faced Partizan of Yugoslavia in the quarter-finals. Inter Milan won the first leg 2–0 away from home and the second leg 2–1 at home to advance 4–1 on aggregate.

In the semi-finals, Inter Milan faced Borussia Dortmund of Germany. After a 2–2 draw in the first leg in Dortmund, Inter Milan won the second leg 2–0 at home to advance to the final 4–2 on aggregate.

=== Real Madrid ===
Real Madrid qualified for the competition as winners of the 1962–63 La Liga.

In the preliminary round, Real Madrid defeated Rangers of Scotland 1–0 away in the first leg and 6–0 at home in the second leg to advance 7–0 on aggregate.

Dinamo București of Romania were Real Madrid's opponents in the first round. After winning the first leg 3–1 away from home, Real Madrid won the second leg at home 5–3 to advance 8–4 on aggregate.

Real Madrid then faced defending champions AC Milan of Italy in the quarter-finals. After winning the first leg 4–1 at home, Real Madrid lost the second leg 2–0 away from home to advance 4–3 on aggregate.

In the semi-finals, Real Madird defeated Zürich of Switzerland 2–1 in the first leg away from home and 6–0 in the second leg at home to advance to the final 8–1 on aggregate.

== Match ==
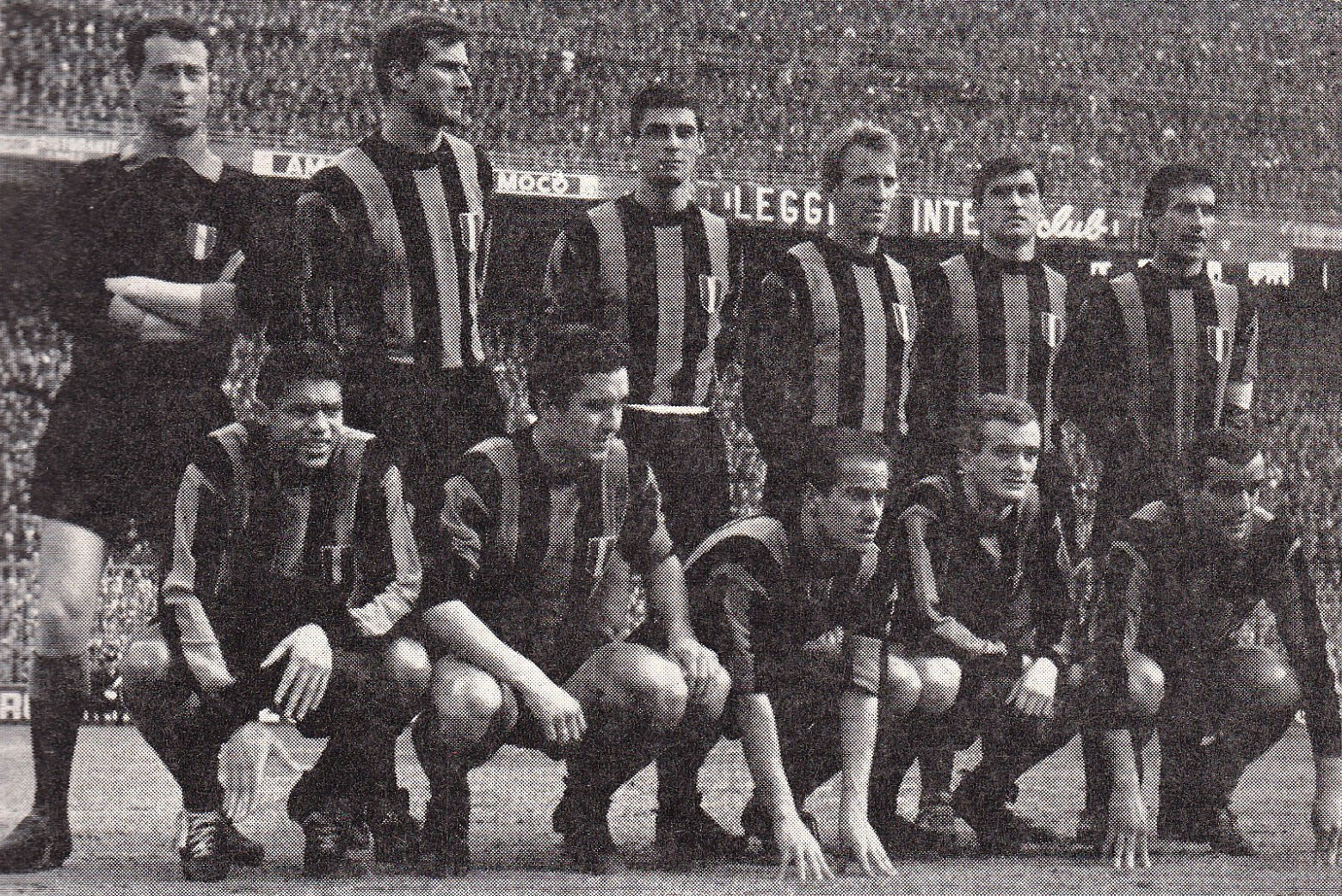
1963–64 Inter Milan team

=== Details ===
27 May 1964
19:30 CET

Inter Milan (Italy)	3–1	(Spain) Real Madrid
Mazzola 43', 76'; Milani 61'	Report	Felo 70'

Praterstadion, Vienna
Attendance: 71,333
Referee: Josef Stoll (Austria)

Inter Milan	Real Madrid

GK	1	(Italy) Giuliano Sarti
RB	2	(Italy) Tarcisio Burgnich
LB	3	(Italy) Giacinto Facchetti
DM	4	(Italy) Carlo Tagnin
CB	5	(Italy) Aristide Guarneri
SW	6	(Italy) Armando Picchi (c)
RW	7	(Brazil) Jair da Costa
CM	8	(Italy) Sandro Mazzola
CF	9	(Italy) Aurelio Milani
CM	10	(Spain) Luis Suárez
LW	11	(Italy) Mario Corso
Manager:
(Argentina) Helenio Herrera

GK	1	(Spain) José Vicente
RB	2	(Spain) Isidro
LB	3	(Spain) Pachín
DM	4	(France) Lucien Muller
CB	5	(Spain) José Santamaría (Note: Although Santamaría had amassed 20 caps for his native Uruguay from 1952 to 1957, he had been representing Spain in international play since 1958.)
DM	6	(Spain) Ignacio Zoco
RW	7	(Spain) Amancio
CM	8	(Spain) Felo
CF	9	(Spain) Alfredo Di Stéfano (Note: Di Stéfano, a native Argentine, had represented both Argentina and Colombia earlier in his international career. He became a naturalised citizen of Spain in 1956, and began playing for the Spain national football team in 1957.)
AM	10	(Spain) Ferenc Puskás (Note: Though more famous for representing his native Hungary in international play during the 1950s, Puskás became a naturalised a citizen of Spain in 1962. He appeared in four matches for Spain during his time at Real Madrid and was named in Spain's squad at the 1962 FIFA World Cup.)
LW	11	(Spain) Paco Gento (c)
Manager:
(Spain) Miguel Muñoz

== See also ==
- 1963–64 Inter Milan season
- 1963–64 Real Madrid CF season
- 1964 European Cup Winners' Cup final
- 1964 Inter-Cities Fairs Cup final
- 1964 Intercontinental Cup
- Inter Milan in international football
- Real Madrid CF in international football
