= Dante Crippa =

Italian footballer (1937–2021)

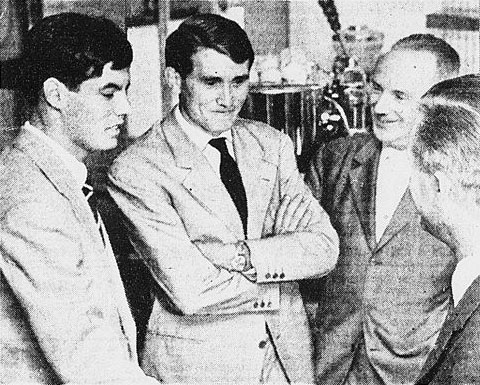
- Salvadore and Crippa with Juventus in the summer of 1962, near the club's president Catella and councilor Giordanetti.

Personal information
- Date of birth: 10 March 1937
- Place of birth: Ronco Briantino, Italy
- Date of death: 27 February 2021 (aged 83)
- Place of death: Brescia, Italy
- Height: 1.75 m (5 ft 9 in)
- Position: Midfielder

Senior career*
| Years | Team | Apps | (Gls) |
| 1955–1956 | Fanfulla | | |
| 1956–1960 | Brescia | 66 | (9) |
| 1960–1962 | Padova | 55 | (7) |
| 1962–1963 | Juventus | 16 | (1) |
| 1963–1966 | SPAL | 51 | (2) |
| 1966–1968 | Reggiana | 63 | (16) |
| 1968–1969 | SPAL | 33 | (7) |
| 1969–1970 | Reggiana | 31 | (6) |
- * Club domestic league appearances and goals

Dante Crippa (10 March 1937 – 27 February 2021) was an Italian professional footballer who played as a midfielder.

== Career ==
Crippa began his youth career with Fanfulla, making his Serie C and his IV Division debut with the senior squad. He was purchased by Brescia in 1956, soon becoming a permanent starter in the squad in Serie B.

In 1960, he was purchased by Nereo Rocco's Padova, making his Serie A debut that season. Throughout his time at the club, he was deployed in a supporting role behind the team's main striker Aurelio Milani, who became Padova's top scorer; together, they formed a notable offensive partnership.

In 1962 he was purchased by Italian Serie A club Juventus for a single season, managing a second-place finish in Serie A during the 1962–63 season, and reaching the quarter finals of the Coppa Italia. During his time at the club, he managed to capture the only trophy of his career in 1963, a minor trophy, the Coppa delle Alpi. During his time with the club, he was mainly used as a back-up and only made 20 appearances.

The following season, Crippa moved to Ferrara to play in Paolo Mazza's SPAL, although the Serie A season was largely disappointing as Crippa went scoreless in each of his 26 league appearances, and was unable to prevent the club from being relegated to Serie B. The following season, however, he played a crucial role in leading the club back to Serie A promotion for the following season, scoring 2 goals.

In 1966, he stayed in Emilia Romagna, but moved to Serie B club Reggiana. During his time at the club, he scored 10 goals in 1968, his personal best. After four seasons in Serie B with the club and 29 goals in 129 appearances, 14 of which were from penalties, Crippa retired from professional football at the age of 33.

== Style of play ==
Despite not being particularly prolific in front of goal, and notwithstanding his lack of stamina and notable physical or athletic attributes due to his small stature, Crippa was known for his excellent crossing ability and passing range, which made him an effective assist provider. He was capable of playing in several offensive and creative midfield positions; he was usually deployed either as a winger, or as an attacking midfielder, although he was also capable of playing as a central midfielder or as a second striker.

== Death ==
Crippa died on 27 February 2021, eleven days short from his 84th birthday, from complications from COVID-19 during the COVID-19 pandemic in Italy.

== Honours ==
Juventus

- Coppa delle Alpi: 1963
