= Ciccolo =

Ciccolo is a surname. Notable people with the surname include:

- Nicola Ciccolo (born 1940), Italian footballer
- Michelle Ciccolo (born 1968), American politician
