= Armando Miranda =

Brazilian footballer (1939-1980)

Personal information
- Date of birth: 12 December 1939
- Place of birth: São Paulo, Brazil
- Date of death: 7 April 1980 (aged 40)
- Place of death: São Paulo, Brazil
- Height: 1.82 m (5 ft 11 1/2 in)
- Position: Striker

Senior career*
Years	Team	Apps	(Gls)
1959–1961	Corinthians	77	(25)
1962	Flamengo	25	(9)
1962–1963	Juventus	20	(15)
1963–1964	Catania	10	(1)
1965	Juventus		
1966	Internacional		
1967–1972	Junior	70	(38)
- * Club domestic league appearances and goals

Armando Miranda (12 December 1939 – 7 April 1980) was a Brazilian professional footballer who played as a forward.
