= Rosario Di Vincenzo =

Italian footballer (1941–2026

Personal information
- Date of birth: 16 June 1941
- Place of birth: Genoa, Italy
- Date of death: 4 March 2026 (aged 84)
- Height: 1.79 m (5 ft 10 in)
- Position: Goalkeeper

Senior career*
Years	Team	Apps	(Gls)
1961–1962	Entella	33	(0)
1962–1963	Inter Milan	0	(0)
1963–1964	Triestina	18	(0)
1964	Inter Milan	3	(0)
1965	Varese	8	(0)
1965–1966	Genoa	18	(0)
1966–1967	Potenza	38	(0)
1967–1972	Lazio	84	(0)
1972–1975	Brindisi	87	(0)
1975–1978	Sampdoria	10	(0)
1978–1979	Imperia	33	(0)
- * Club domestic league appearances and goals

Rosario Di Vincenzo (16 June 1941 – 4 March 2026) was an Italian professional footballer who played as a goalkeeper. He died on 4 March 2026, at the age of 84.

== Honours ==
- Serie A: 1964–65
- European Cup: 1964–65
- Coppa delle Alpi: 1971
