= Francesco Canella =

Italian footballer

Personal information
- Date of birth: January 28, 1939 (age 87)
- Place of birth: Noventa di Piave, Italy
- Height: 1.73 m (5 ft 8 in)
- Position: Striker

Senior career*
Years	Team	Apps	(Gls)
1956–1959	Venezia	64	(17)
1959–1962	Udinese	64	(17)
1962–1964	Fiorentina	40	(6)
1964	Messina	0	(0)
1964–1965	Internazionale	4	(0)
1965–1966	Genoa	21	(3)
1966–1967	Lecco	21	(0)
1967–1968	Mestrina	26	(?)
1968–1969	Marzotto Valdagno	33	(0)
1969–1973	Belluno	62	(?)
1973–1975	Sandonà		
- * Club domestic league appearances and goals

Francesco Canella (born January 28, 1939, in Noventa di Piave) is an Italian former professional footballer.

== Honours ==
- Serie A champion: 1964–65, 1965–66
