= Carlo Tagnin =

Italian footballer and manager (1932–2000)

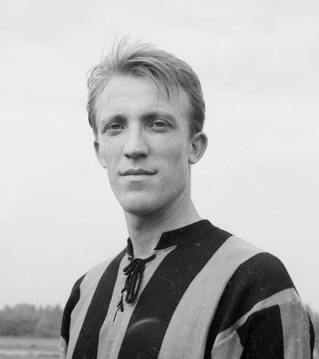

Personal information
- Full name: Carlo Tagnin
- Date of birth: 18 November 1932
- Place of birth: Valle San Bartolomeo, Alessandria, Italy
- Date of death: 13 March 2000 (aged 67)
- Place of death: Alessandria, Italy
- Height: 1.75 m (5 ft 9 in)
- Position: Midfielder

Youth career
- 1948–1951: Torino

Senior career*
Years	Team	Apps	(Gls)
1952–1954	Torino	7	(0)
1952–1953	→ Alessandria	31	(10)
1954–1957	Monza	78	(3)
1957–1958	Alessandria	29	(3)
1958–1959	Lazio	29	(1)
1959–1961	Bari	64	(5)
1962–1965	Inter	36	(1)
1965–1966	Alessandria	28	(0)
Total		302	(23)

Managerial career
- 1972–1973: Albese
- 1973–1974: Savona
- 1975–1983: Inter Youth Side
- 1983–1985: Alessandria Youth Side
- 1985–1986: Alessandria
- * Club domestic league appearances and goals

Carlo Tagnin (18 November 1932 – 13 March 2000) was an Italian footballer and manager, who played as a midfielder, most notably for the famous Inter side of the 1960s, which achieved much success, both domestically and internationally. As a defensive midfielder, he was known in particular for his stamina, work-rate, and man-marking ability, which allowed him to support his more offensive teammates defensively.

== Playing career ==
After growing up in Torino's youth sector, Tagnin was later promoted to the club's senior side, but began his professional career during the 1952–53 season, on loan to his hometown club Alessandria, in Serie C. He returned to Torino the following season, and remained with the club until 1954, making his Serie A debut with the club in a 1–1 away draw against Sampdoria, on 13 September 1953. He later also played for Monza in Serie B (1954–57), briefly returning to Alessandria for the 1957–58 Serie A season. Tagnin subsequently played for Lazio (1958–59), where he won the Coppa Italia in 1958, and Bari (1959–61), but was subsequently banned for 2 1/2 seasons after being accused of being involved in a gambling scandal. His sentence was later reduced by a year, and in 1962, he joined Internazionale, where he had his most notable spell, remaining with the club until 1965, after struggling to gain playing time ahead of the younger defensive midfielder Gianfranco Bedin during his final season with the team. Tagnin ended his career after the 1965–66 season, returning to Alessandria once again, in Serie B.

While at Inter, Tagnin was part of the starting eleven of Helenio Herrera's Grande Inter side which won the European Champions Cup final in 1964, during which he demonstrated his excellent man-marking abilities against Real Madrid's star player Alfredo Di Stefano. With Inter he also won two Serie A titles, in 1963 and 1965, as well as a second European Cup in 1965, and the 1964 Intercontinental Cup, making 56 appearances (36 in Serie A), and scoring 1 goal, which came in Serie A.

== Managerial career ==
Tagnin later worked as a coach, beginning his managerial career with Albese (1972–73), and later coaching Savona (1973–74), the Inter Youth Side (1975–83), and the Alessandria Youth Side (1983–85), before leading the senior side for the 1985–86 Serie C2 season.

== Death ==
Tagnin died of osteosarcoma on 13 March 2000, in his hometown of Alessandria, at the age of 67. In a 2004 interview with l'espresso, his former Inter teammate Ferruccio Mazzola suggested that his death was associated with health-damaging performance-enhancing drugs that were allegedly given to the players of the Grande Inter side under manager Helenio Herrera.

== Honours ==
=== Player ===
Lazio

- Coppa Italia: 1958

Inter

- Serie A: 1962–63, 1964–65
- European Cup: 1963–64, 1964–65
- Intercontinental Cup: 1964
