= Giovanni Ferretti (footballer) =

Italian footballer

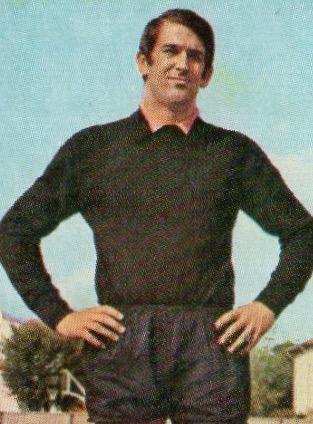

Personal information
- Date of birth: 15 January 1940
- Place of birth: Cremona, Italy
- Date of death: 5 August 2007 (aged 67)
- Height: 1.82 m (5 ft 11 1/2 in)
- Position: Goalkeeper

Senior career*
Years	Team	Apps	(Gls)
1956–1957	Casalese		
1957–1962	Reggiana	60	(0)
1962–1963	Internazionale	4	(0)
1963–1964	Modena	9	(0)
1964	Internazionale	0	(0)
1964–1974	Palermo	166	(0)
1974–1975	Arezzo	27	(0)
- * Club domestic league appearances and goals

Giovanni Ferretti (born 15 January 1940 in Cremona; died 5 August 2007) was an Italian professional football player.

== Honours ==
- Serie A champion: 1962/63.
