= 1963–64 Serie A =

61st season of top-tier Italian football

Serie A
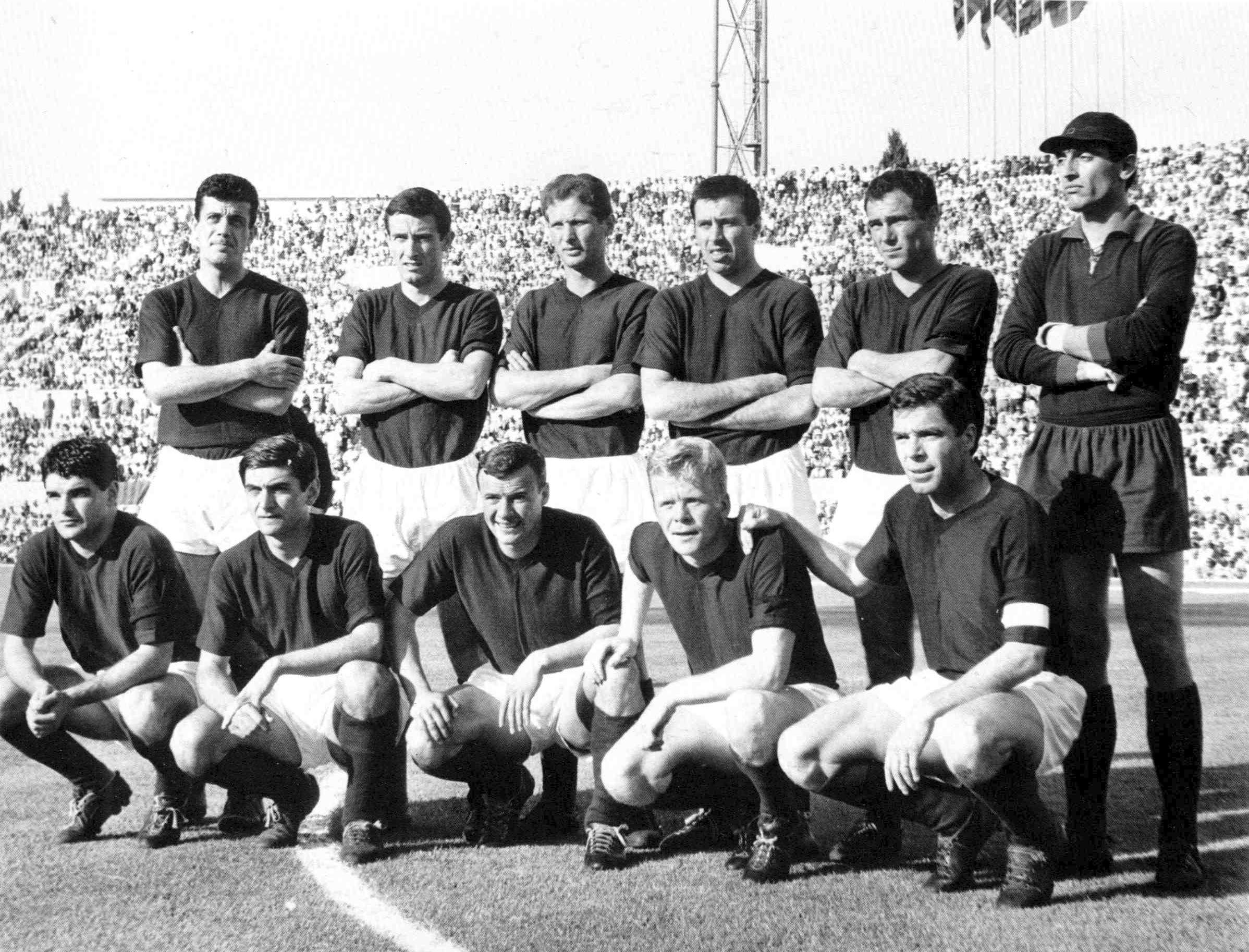
- 1963–64 Bologna team
- Season: 1963–64
- Dates: 14 September 1963 – 31 May 1964
- Champions: Bologna; 7th title
- Relegated: Modena; SPAL; Bari
- European Cup: Bologna; Internazionale
- Cup Winners' Cup: Torino
- Inter-Cities Fairs Cup: Milan; Fiorentina; Juventus; Roma
- Matches: 306
- Goals: 647 (2.11 per match)
- Top goalscorer: Harald Nielsen (21 goals)

The 1963–64 Serie A season was won by Bologna.

Serie A 1963–64 team distribution

== Teams ==
Messina, Bari and Lazio had been promoted from Serie B.

== Final classification ==
Pos	Team	Pld	W	D	L	GF	GA	GD	Pts	Qualification or relegation
1	Bologna (C)	34	22	10	2	54	18	+36	54	Qualification to European Cup (Note: Inter qualified as defending champions.)
2	Internazionale (Note: After the title tie-breaker with Bologna (2–0).)	34	23	8	3	54	21	+33	54	Qualification to European Cup
3	Milan	34	21	9	4	58	28	+30	51	Chosen for Inter-Cities Fairs Cup
4	Fiorentina	34	14	10	10	43	27	+16	38	Chosen for Inter-Cities Fairs Cup
4	Juventus	34	14	10	10	49	37	+12	38	Chosen for Inter-Cities Fairs Cup
6	Vicenza	34	13	10	11	34	36	−2	36	
7	Torino (Note: Qualified to the CWC for an erroneous bet over the late Coppa Italia final against AS Roma.)	34	9	17	8	32	32	0	35	Qualification to Cup Winners' Cup
8	Genoa	34	10	10	14	33	34	−1	30	
8	Lazio	34	9	12	13	21	24	−3	30	
8	Catania	34	9	12	13	32	44	−12	30	
8	Atalanta	34	7	16	11	26	43	−17	30	
12	Roma (Note: Invited to the Fairs Cup as compensation for the exclusion from the CWC.)	34	9	11	14	43	44	−1	29	Chosen for Inter-Cities Fairs Cup
12	Mantova	34	6	17	11	28	39	−11	29	
14	Messina	34	9	10	15	25	46	−21	28	
15	Sampdoria	34	10	7	17	38	50	−12	27	Relegation tie-breaker
16	Modena (R)	34	6	15	13	29	42	−13	27	Serie B after tie-breaker
17	SPAL (R)	34	6	12	16	28	39	−11	24	Relegation to Serie B
18	Bari (R)	34	6	10	18	20	43	−23	22	Relegation to Serie B

Source: Panini
(C) Champions; (R) Relegated

== Results ==
Home \ Away	ATA	BAR	BOL	CTN	FIO	GEN	INT	JUV	LRV	LAZ	MAN	MES	MIL	MOD	ROM	SAM	SPA	TOR
Atalanta		1–0	1–1	3–0	1–7	1–3	1–3	3–0	2–1	1–1	0–0	3–0	0–0	1–1	1–0	0–0	0–0	1–1
Bari	4–0		0–1	0–0	2–0	0–2	1–1	1–1	1–0	0–2	0–0	0–1	0–2	0–0	1–3	2–1	1–0	0–3
Bologna	2–0	3–1		1–0	2–0	1–1	1–2	2–1	3–0	1–0	2–1	2–0	2–2	0–0	4–0	1–0	2–1	4–1
Catania	0–0	1–0	1–3		2–0	5–3	1–2	2–0	0–1	1–0	0–0	2–0	0–1	1–0	0–0	1–5	0–0	1–0
Fiorentina	4–0	1–0	0–0	1–1		2–0	1–3	2–1	0–2	1–0	0–1	0–1	2–1	0–0	0–0	3–0	1–0	1–1
Genoa	0–0	0–0	0–2	0–2	2–1		0–2	3–1	0–0	4–1	1–0	3–0	1–1	2–2	3–0	0–1	1–0	0–0
Internazionale	2–1	3–0	0–0	4–1	1–1	1–0		1–0	0–0	1–0	2–0	4–0	0–2	2–1	1–0	1–0	0–0	3–1
Juventus	0–0	4–0	0–0	4–2	1–1	0–0	4–1		4–1	0–3	2–2	2–1	1–2	0–0	3–1	1–0	3–1	3–1
Vicenza	3–0	2–1	1–3	1–1	1–0	1–0	1–0	0–1		1–0	1–1	1–1	0–1	4–3	2–1	1–3	1–0	1–1
Lazio	0–1	1–0	1–2	0–0	1–1	1–0	0–0	0–2	0–1		2–0	0–0	1–1	1–0	1–1	0–0	0–0	0–0
Mantova	1–1	0–0	0–0	1–0	0–3	0–0	2–2	1–1	0–0	0–0		2–2	1–4	3–0	1–0	2–0	2–0	0–0
Messina	1–1	1–1	0–2	0–0	0–3	1–0	0–1	1–0	2–0	0–2	1–0		1–2	2–0	2–1	4–3	0–0	1–1
Milan	2–0	2–0	1–2	3–1	2–1	3–1	1–1	2–2	2–1	0–1	1–0	3–0		3–0	2–1	0–1	1–1	1–1
Modena	1–0	1–1	1–4	0–0	0–1	2–1	0–1	1–0	2–3	2–1	1–1	0–0	0–1		3–3	3–0	4–3	0–0
Roma	1–1	0–0	0–1	4–4	1–1	1–0	0–1	1–2	1–1	0–0	2–1	2–0	2–3	2–0		6–1	2–0	3–0
Sampdoria	1–1	2–0	2–0	4–1	0–1	0–1	1–5	0–2	1–1	1–0	1–1	3–1	1–2	1–1	0–2		3–1	0–0
SPAL	0–0	3–1	0–0	3–1	0–0	0–0	0–1	1–3	1–0	0–1	5–2	1–1	2–4	0–0	2–0	3–1		0–1
Torino	3–0	1–2	0–0	0–0	0–3	2–1	0–2	0–0	0–0	2–0	5–2	1–0	0–0	0–0	2–2	2–1	2–0	

Source: Almanacco Illustrato del Calcio – La Storia 1898–2004, Panini Edizioni, Modena, September 2005 (in Italian)
Legend: Blue = home team win; Yellow = draw; Red = away team win.

== Championship tie-breaker ==
With both Inter and Bologna level on 54 points, a play-off match was conducted to decide the champion for the first and only time in Serie A history.

7 June 1964

Bologna	2–0	Internazionale
Facchetti 75' (o.g.); Nielsen 82'

Stadio Olimpico, Rome
Referee: Concetto Lo Bello

== Relegation tie-breaker ==
7 June 1964

Modena	0–2	Sampdoria
		Barison 61'; Salvi 72'

San Siro, Milan
Referee: Marco De Marchi

Modena relegated to Serie B.

== Top goalscorers ==
Rank	Player	Club	Goals
1	(Denmark) Harald Nielsen	Bologna	21
2	(Sweden) Kurt Hamrin	Fiorentina	19
3	(Brazil) Luís Vinício	Vicenza	18
4	(Brazil) Amarildo	Milan	14
5	(Italy) José Altafini	Milan	13
5	(Argentina) (Italy) Omar Sívori	Juventus	13
5	(Italy) Paolo Barison	Sampdoria	13
8	(Brazil) Jair da Costa	Internazionale	12
9	(Brazil) Nené	Juventus	11
10	(Italy) Sergio Brighenti	Modena	10

== Attendances ==
#	Club	Average
1	Internazionale	43,328
2	Milan	38,148
3	Roma	31,269
4	Bologna	30,286
5	Juventus	28,233
6	Fiorentina	25,051
7	Lazio	24,979
8	Torino	21,153
9	Bari	19,934
10	Genoa	19,572
11	Atalanta	16,690
12	Modena	15,962
13	Sampdoria	15,118
14	Mantova	14,550
15	Catania	13,169
16	Messina	12,408
17	SPAL	9,855
18	Vicenza	9,392

== References and sources ==
- Almanacco Illustrato del Calcio – La Storia 1898–2004, Panini Edizioni, Modena, September 2005
