= Carlo Facchin =

Italian footballer (1938–2022)

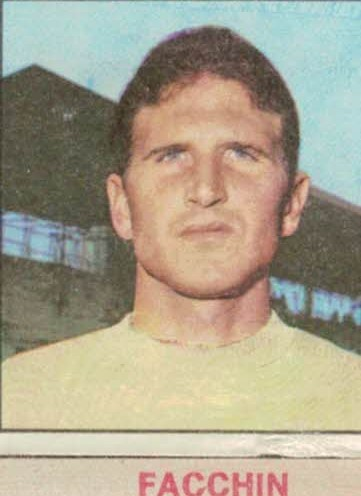

Personal information
- Date of birth: 27 August 1938
- Place of birth: Portogruaro, Italy
- Date of death: 27 November 2022 (aged 84)
- Position: Forward

Senior career*
Years	Team	Apps	(Gls)
1958–1959	Mestre		
1959–1960	SPAL		
1960–1961	Rimini		
1960–1961	Simmenthal-Monza		
1962–1964	Reggiana		
1964–1966	Catania	65	(22)
1966–1969	Torino	69	(19)
1969–1970	Lanerossi Vicenza	33	(3)
1970–1971	Reggina		
1971–1972	Lazio		

Managerial career
- 1972–1973: Pro Vercelli
- 1976–1977: Reggina
- 1977–1978: Pro Vercelli
- 1978–1980: Siracusa
- 1982–1983: Modena
- 1984–1985: Venezia
- Italy women
- * Club domestic league appearances and goals

Carlo Facchin (27 August 1938 – 27 November 2022) was an Italian football player and manager.

== Career ==
Facchin was the head coach of the Italy women's national team at the 1999 FIFA Women's World Cup.
