= Pedro Manfredini =

Argentine footballer (1935–2019)

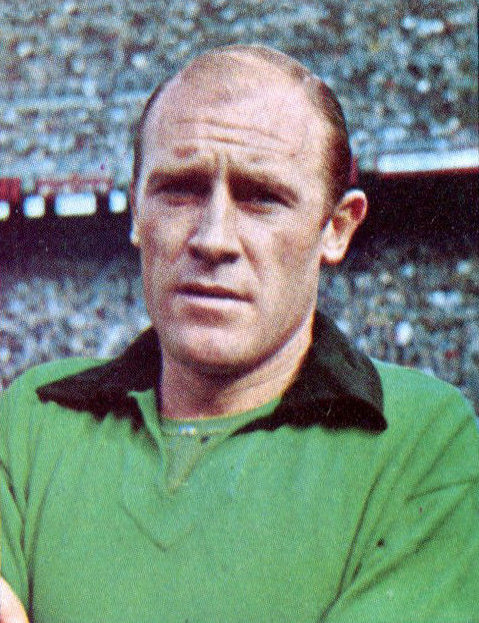
- Manfredini with Venezia, c. 1966.

Personal information
- Full name: Pedro Waldemar Manfredini
- Date of birth: 7 September 1935
- Place of birth: Maipú, Argentina
- Date of death: 21 January 2019 (aged 83)
- Place of death: Rome
- Height: 1.72 m (5 ft 8 in)
- Position: Striker

Senior career*
Years	Team	Apps	(Gls)
1959	Racing Club	39	(28)
1959–1965	Roma	130	(76)
1965	Brescia	8	(1)
1966–1968	Venezia	23	(4)
1969	Deportes La Serena	29	(17)
Total		229	(126)

International career
1959	Argentina	3	(2)
- * Club domestic league appearances and goals

Pedro Waldemar Manfredini (7 September 1935 – 21 January 2019) was an Argentine professional footballer who played as a striker.

== Club career ==
Manfredini began his career with Argentine club Racing Club de Avellaneda in 1957, winning the 1958 Argentine Primera División, and finishing the season as the joint-fourth highest goalscorer, and as his club's top scorer, with 19 goals.

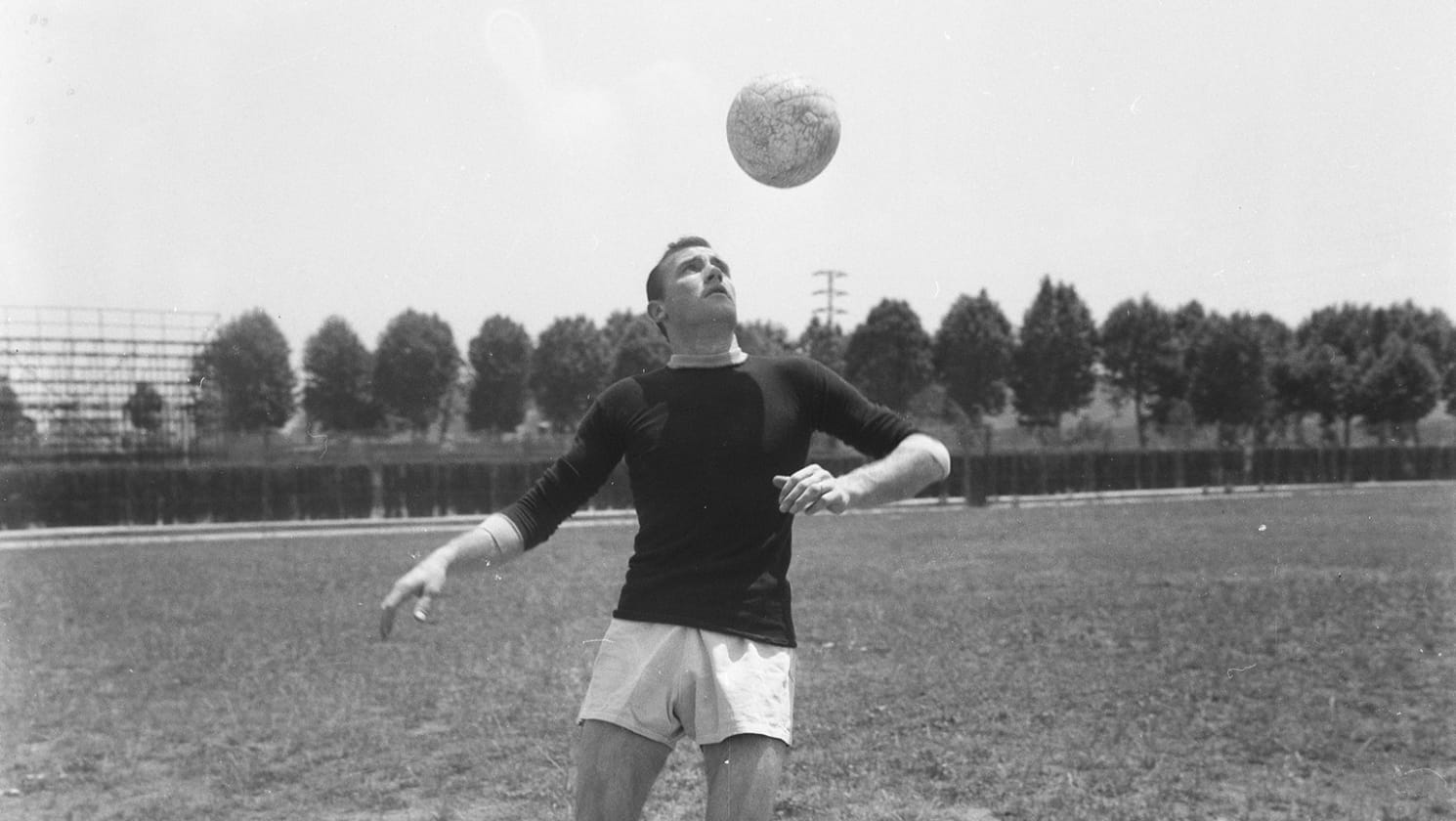
Manfredini in training with A.S. Roma between 1950s and 1960s

After two seasons in Argentina, he subsequently moved to Italian Serie A side A.S. Roma in 1959, where he played for seven seasons. He won the Inter-Cities Fairs Cup with the club in 1961 (the predecessor to the UEFA Cup), finishing as the top scorer of the tournament, with 12 goals.

During the 1962–63 season, he was the Serie A top scorer (tied with Harald Nielsen with 19 goals), and he once again finished as the top scorer of the 1962–63 Inter-Cities Fairs Cup, scoring 6 goals throughout the tournament, as Roma reached the semi-finals, losing out to the eventual champions Valencia. He also won the Coppa Italia with Roma during the 1963–64 season, finishing the tournament as top scorer yet again, with 4 goals. In total, he played 130 games for A.S. Roma and scored 76 times.

He later spent a season with Brescia and then Venezia before moving to Chile and playing for Deportes La Serena in 1969, his last club.

== International career ==
Manfredini was capped three times for Argentina, scoring two goals. He took part in the first ever edition of the Copa América in 1959, on home soil, making his debut in the competition, and appearing three times. He scored two goals in a 6–1 win against Chile in the opening match of the tournament, which was also his international debut, helping his country to lift the South American Championship title.

== Honours ==
=== Club ===
Racing Club

- Primera División: 1958

Roma

- Coppa Italia: 1963–64
- Inter-Cities Fairs Cup: 1960–61

=== International ===
Argentina

- Copa América: 1959

=== Individual ===
- Serie A top goal-scorer: 1962–63
- Coppa Italia top goal-scorer: 1963–64
- Inter-Cities Fairs Cup top goal-scorer: 1960–61, 1962–63
