= Sergio Codognato =

Italian footballer (1944–2024)

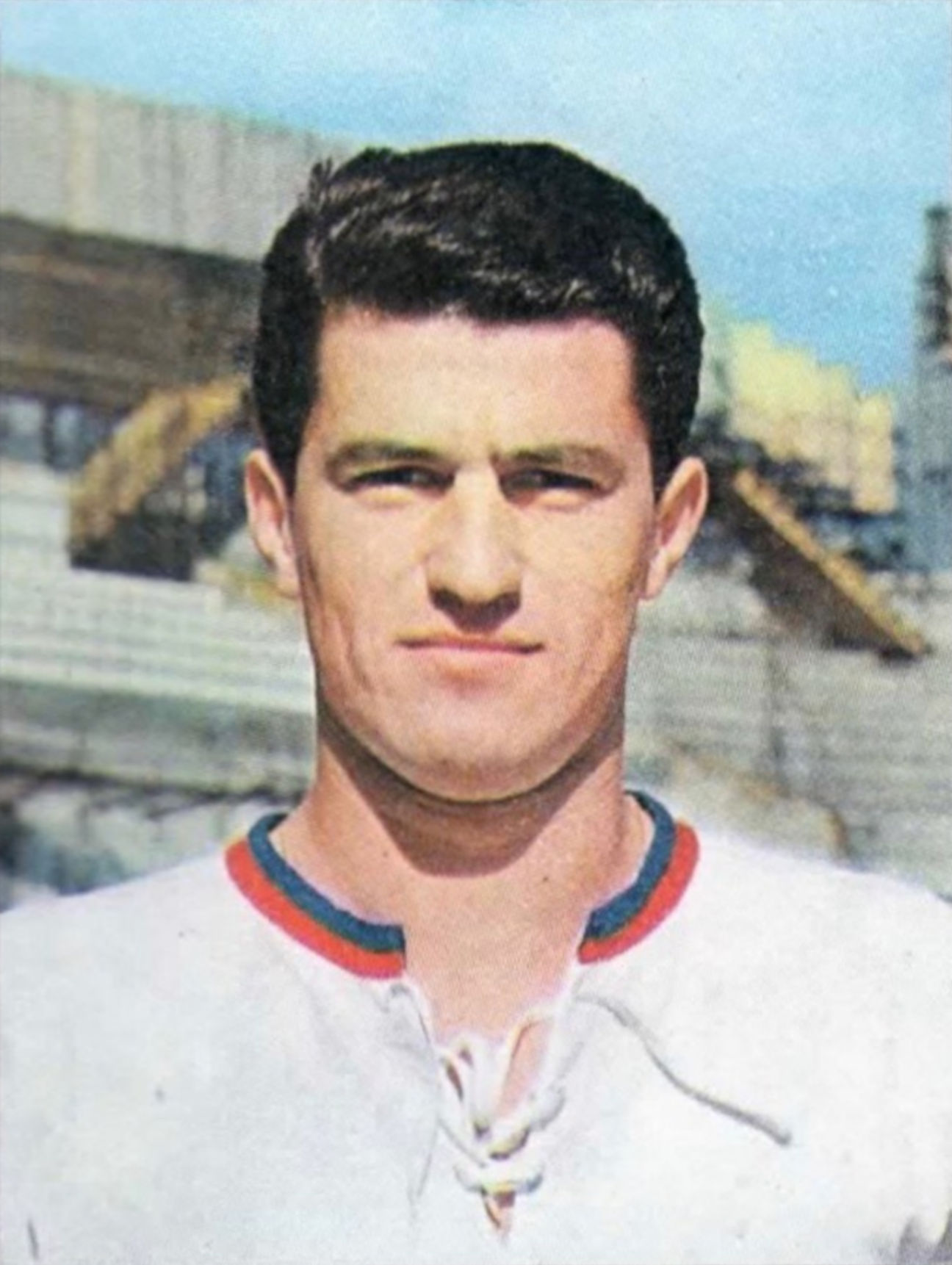
- Codognato with Catania in 1964

Personal information
- Date of birth: 3 April 1944
- Place of birth: Limbiate, Italy
- Date of death: 2 August 2024 (aged 80)
- Height: 1.79 m (5 ft 10 in)
- Position: Defender

Senior career*
Years	Team	Apps	(Gls)
1963–1964	Inter Milan	3	(0)
1964–1965	Catania	3	(0)
1965–1966	Alessandria	18	(0)
1966–1967	Salernitana	14	(0)
1967–1968	Ravenna	38	(0)
1968–1969	Modena	15	(0)
1969–1970	Torres Sassari	37	(3)
1970–1976	Cosenza	200	(24)
1976–1978	Trento	51	(6)

Managerial career
- 1973–1974: Cosenza
- 1975–1976: Cosenza
- 1993–1994: Trento
- * Club domestic league appearances and goals

Sergio Codognato (3 April 1944 – 2 August 2024) was an Italian football player and coach who played as a defender. He played in Serie A for Inter Milan and Catania. Codognato died on 2 August 2024, at the age of 80.
