= Franco Zaglio =

Italian footballer

Personal information
- Full name: Franco Zaglio
- Date of birth: 2 March 1936 (age 90)
- Place of birth: Cremona, Kingdom of Italy
- Height: 1.72 m (5 ft 7 1/2 in)
- Position: Midfielder

Youth career
- Cremonese

Senior career*
Years	Team	Apps	(Gls)
1953–1956	Cremonese	45	(4)
1956–1957	Lazio	0	(0)
1957–1958	SPAL	32	(1)
1958–1960	Roma	57	(9)
1960–1964	Internazionale	54	(4)
1964–1965	Mantova	8	(0)
1965–1966	Genoa	5	(1)
Total		201	(19)

International career
1959	Italy	2	(0)
- * Club domestic league appearances and goals

Franco Zaglio (Italian pronunciation: [ˈfraŋko dˈdzaʎʎo]; born 2 March 1936) is an Italian retired footballer who played as a midfielder.

== Honours ==
Internazionale

- Serie A (1): 1962–63
- European Cup (1): 1963–64
