= Mario Corso =

Italian footballer and coach (1941–2020)

- Corso with Inter Milan

Personal information
- Date of birth: 25 August 1941
- Place of birth: Verona, Italy
- Date of death: 19 June 2020 (aged 78)
- Place of death: Milan, Italy
- Height: 1.75 m (5 ft 9 in)
- Position: Winger

Youth career
- A.C. Audace SME

Senior career*
Years	Team	Apps	(Gls)
1957–1973	Inter Milan	413	(75)
1973–1975	Genoa	26	(3)
Total		439	(78)

International career
1961–1971	Italy	23	(4)

Managerial career
- 1978–1982: Napoli Primavera
- 1982–1983: Lecce
- 1983–1984: Catanzaro
- 1984–1985: Inter Milan Primavera
- 1985–1986: Inter Milan
- 1987–1989: Mantova
- 1989–1990: Barletta
- * Club domestic league appearances and goals

Mario Corso (Italian pronunciation: [ˈmaːrjo ˈkorso]; 25 August 1941 – 19 June 2020) was an Italian football player and coach. A famed and dynamic left winger, he was regarded as one of the greatest Italian players in his position, earning the nicknames "Mandrake" and "God's Left Foot", due to his skills, free kick technique and crossing ability.

Corso was mostly remembered for his highly successful club career at Inter Milan, and was a key member of Helenio Herrera's Grande Inter side. He also represented the Italy national team on 23 occasions. After retiring, he later served as a coach for Inter Milan and other teams, winning the B group of the 1987–88 Serie C2 campaign with Mantova.

== Club career ==
Corso was an important player of Inter Milan, the team with which he played almost exclusively throughout his entire career, from 1957 to 1973, winning four Serie A titles, two European Champions and two Intercontinental Cups, also reaching another European Cup final, and a Coppa Italia final. Corso made his Inter debut at the age of 16, in a Coppa Italia match against Como, which Inter won 3–0; on his debut, Corso scored the second goal of the match, becoming the youngest ever goalscorer in Inter's history. On 23 November 1957, he also made his Serie A debut, in a 5–1 win against Sampdoria, soon becoming a permanent member of the starting eleven, and later serving as captain of the squad. Corso had a role on the left wing in Helenio Herrera's Inter Milan team of the 1960s, which is known as La Grande Inter, winning consecutive Serie A, European Cup, and Intercontinental Cup titles. Following his time with Inter, Corso briefly moved to Genoa in 1973, remaining there for two seasons before retiring in 1975. In total, he played 436 matches with 78 goals in Serie A.

== International career ==
In total, Corso made 23 appearances for the Italy national team over ten years, scoring four goals, although he was never elected to take part in a major international tournament with Italy. He made his debut in 1961, in a 3–2 home loss against England in an international friendly match. On 15 October 1961, he scored his first goals for Italy, scoring two goals against Israel in a 1962 FIFA World Cup qualifying match, which Italy won 4–2 away from home. He also scored a goal in the return leg on 4 November, in Turin. Following an argument with manager Edmondo Fabbri, he was left out of Italy's 1962 FIFA World Cup squad, which was eliminated in the first round of the tournament. He returned to the starting line-up in 1964, and on 10 May, he scored his final goal for Italy in a 3–1 victory against Switzerland. He would also later be excluded from Italy's squad in their similarly disappointing 1966 FIFA World Cup campaign, as well as Italy's victorious UEFA Euro 1968 squad, which won the tournament on home soil. He was once again excluded from the Italian side that would reach the final of the 1970 FIFA World Cup. Corso made his final appearance for Italy on 9 October 1971, in a 3–0 victory against Sweden. Along with Giuliano Sarti, Armando Picchi, Gianfranco Bedin, and Antonio Angelillo, he is one of the most successful Italian, Inter club players to have never been called up for a World Cup. Despite his exclusion from the national side, in 1967 FIFA placed him in their All-Star team for an international friendly against Spain, in honour of goalkeeper Ricardo Zamora, winning the match 3–0.

== Style of play ==
A predominantly left-footed player, Corso was noted for his consistency, intelligence, pace on the ball, and stamina as a winger, as well as being renowned for his accurate distribution, crossing ability, creativity, vision, and wide range of passing with his stronger foot, which made him an effective playmaker. He was capable of playing both on the left and right flank, due to his ability to provide crosses from the touchline on the left wing, or cut into the middle to strike on goal from the right. An atypical winger, he was notorious for his lack of tactical discipline, and often played between the lines in more of a central, free role, as a sort of attacking midfielder; because of this, he was capable of playing both as a forward and as a midfielder. Although he was not particularly quick footed, he was gifted with tenacity and a good physique, as well as class, outstanding technical ability, close control, flair, and dribbling skills. An accurate free-kick taker, he was known in particular for his powerful, bending knuckleball free-kicks and shots from distance. In spite of his ability, the journalist Gianni Brera accused him of being inconsistent, lacking dynamism, and having a poor defensive work-rate, something which Corso himself denied, however; as a result, Brera gave Corso the nickname "past participle of the verb "to run"", a reference to his surname, as well as the fact that, according to Brera, Corso did not run a lot during matches, preferring to make the ball move.

== Later life and death ==
Corso died on 19 June 2020, at the age of 78.

== Honours ==
Inter Milan

- Serie A: 1962–63, 1964–65, 1965–66, 1970–71
- European Cup: 1963–64, 1964–65
- Intercontinental Cup: 1964, 1965

Individual

- World Soccer World XI: 1966
