= Beniamino Di Giacomo =

Italian football player and manager (1935–2026)

Personal information
- Date of birth: 13 November 1935
- Place of birth: Porto Recanati, Italy
- Date of death: 7 July 2026 (aged 90)
- Place of death: Civitanova Marche, Italy
- Height: 1.70 m (5 ft 7 in)
- Position: Striker

Senior career*
Years	Team	Apps	(Gls)
1952–1954	Portorecanati		
1954–1955	Castelfidardo		
1955–1957	SPAL	58	(16)
1957–1961	Napoli	120	(32)
1961–1962	Lecco	34	(14)
1962	Torino	5	(2)
1962–1964	Inter Milan	34	(13)
1964–1968	Mantova	117	(22)
1968–1969	Cesena	17	(5)
1969–1972	Anconitana	81	(23)
1972–1973	Bellaria Igea Marina		

International career
1964	Italy	1	(0)

Managerial career
- Osimana
- Jesi
- Fano
- Fabriano
- Civitanovese
- 1987: Ternana
- * Club domestic league appearances and goals

Beniamino Di Giacomo (Italian pronunciation: [benjaˈmiːno di ˈdʒaːkomo]; 13 November 1935 – 7 July 2026) was an Italian professional football player and manager who played as a forward. He died in Civitanova Marche on 7 July 2026, at the age of 90.

== Honours ==
Inter Milan

- Serie A: 1962–63
- European Cup: 1963–64
