= Harald Nielsen =

Danish footballer (1941–2015)

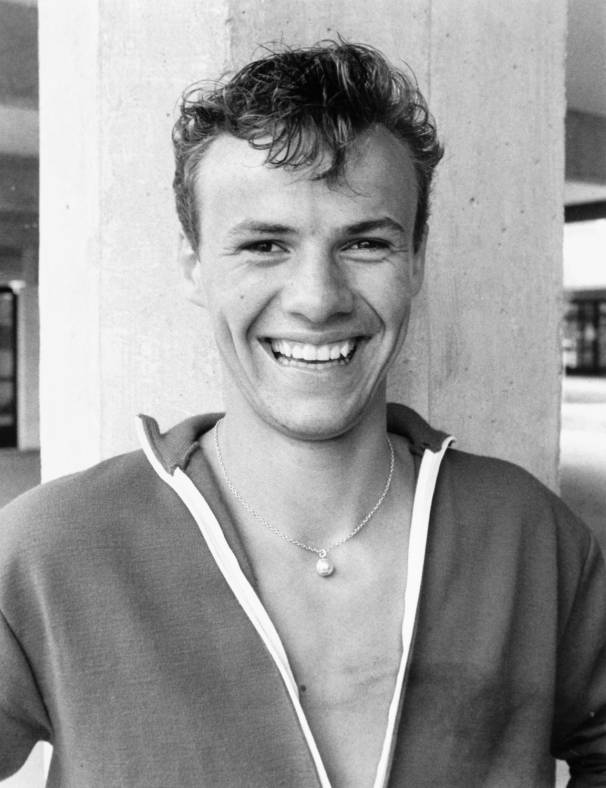
- Nielsen in the early 1960s

Personal information
- Full name: Harald Ingemann Nielsen
- Date of birth: 26 October 1941
- Place of birth: Frederikshavn, Denmark
- Date of death: 11 August 2015 (aged 73)
- Place of death: Klampenborg, Denmark
- Height: 1.78 m (5 ft 10 in)
- Position: Forward

Senior career*
Years	Team	Apps	(Gls)
1959–1961	Frederikshavn fI	50	(44)
1961–1967	Bologna	157	(104)
1967–1968	Internazionale	8	(2)
1968–1969	Napoli	10	(2)
1969–1970	Sampdoria	4	(0)
Total		229	(152)

International career
1959–1960	Denmark	14	(15)
Medal record
Representing Denmark
Men's Football
Silver medal – second place	1960 Rome	Team competition
- * Club domestic league appearances and goals

Harald Ingemann Nielsen (26 October 1941 – 11 August 2015) was a Danish footballer who played as a forward. He played professionally for Italian club Bologna F.C. where he was the league top scorer (capocannoniere) in Bologna's 1964 Serie A championship winning season. Harald Nielsen played 14 games for the Denmark national team in 1959 and 1960, scoring 15 goals, and he was known as Guld-Harald (Gold-Harald). He was a football entrepreneur having continuously worked for the professionalization of both the Demark national team and the national league.

== Club career ==
Harald Nielsen was born in Frederikshavn and started his footballing career in hometown club Frederikshavn fI, where he debuted in the second-highest Danish league in March 1959. From his position of center forward, Nielsen finished the top scorer of the league as Frederikshavn won promotion to the Danish football championship.

In the top Danish league, Nielsen debuted for Frederikshavn against Boldklubben Frem in March 1960. Frederikshavn won 3–1, with Harald Nielsen scoring all three goals. The team finished the league in fifth place with Nielsen becoming league top scorer.

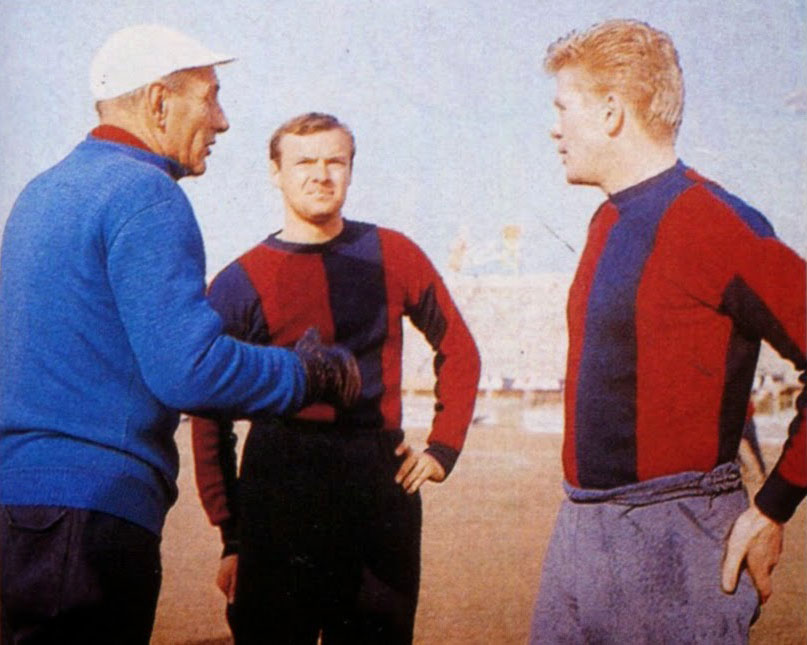
Nielsen with Bologna in the early 1960s, between manager Bernardini (left) and teammate Haller (right).

In 1961, Harald Nielsen moved abroad to play professionally for Bologna F.C. in Italy. At Bologna, il freddo danese (the cold Dane) was a part of the 1963–64 Serie A winning squad, and he was the Italian league topscorer in both 1963 and 1964. Following six seasons at Bologna, Harald Nielsen moved to Inter in 1967, in a transfer deal which made him the most expensive player in the world at the time. Although he started by winning the unofficial world cup for teams by beating Santos with Pelé 1–0 in New York, Nielsen did not find the same degree of success with Inter as in Bologna, and following years at S.S.C. Napoli and U.C. Sampdoria a back injury kept him mostly off the field, he ended his career in 1970.

== International career ==
Harald Nielsen made his debut for the Denmark national team on 13 September 1959 against Norway in Oslo, as the youngest Denmark national team player ever. Only 17 years and 322 days old, he scored a single goal in the 4–2 win.

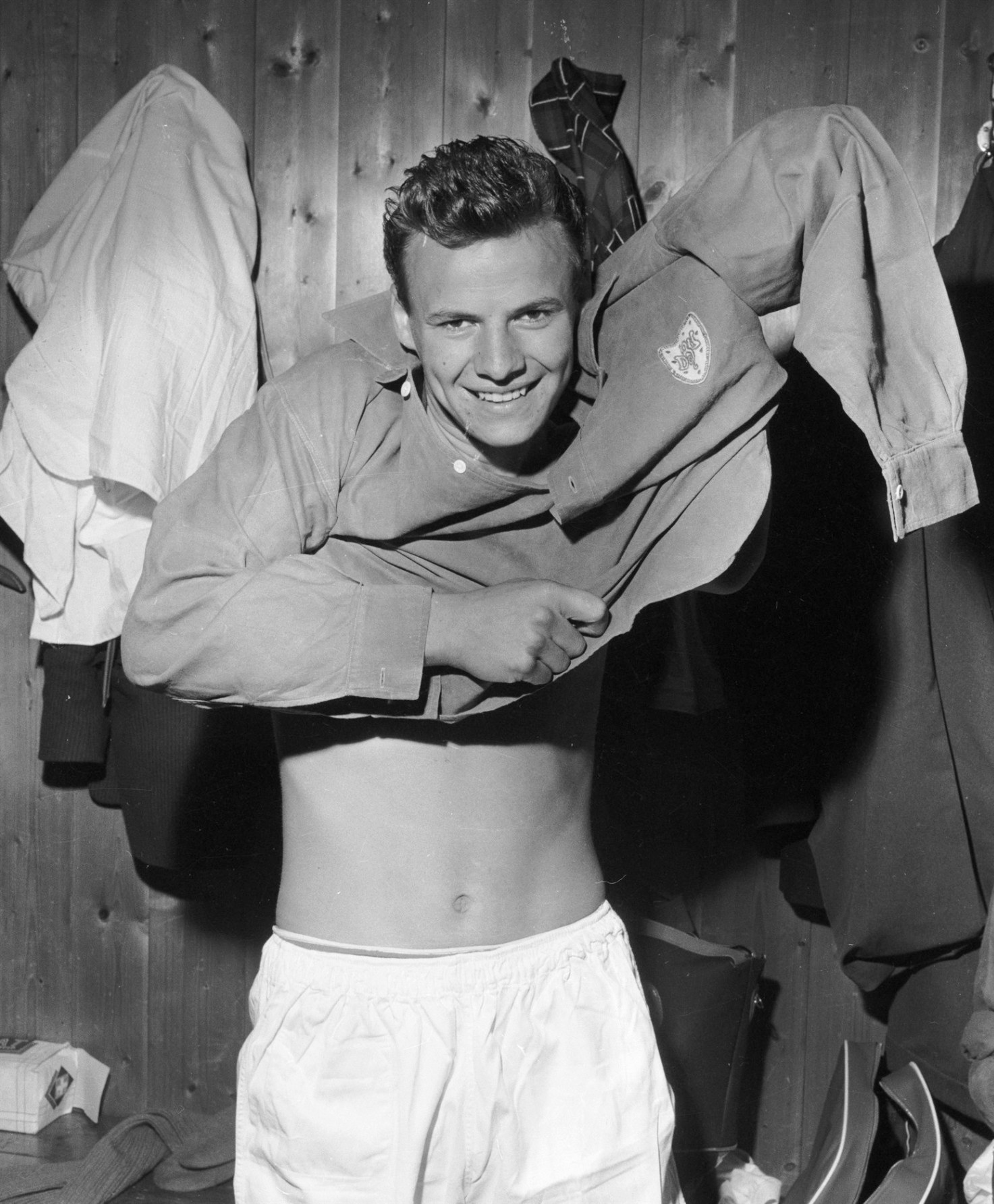
Nielsen with the Denmark national team in 1964.

In the summer of 1960, he represented Denmark at the 1960 Summer Olympics football tournament in Rome. Denmark finished runners-up and Nielsen was the leading goals scorer of the tournament with 6 goals.

His international potential as a striker became obvious already on 10 May 1960, when he scored two goals in a Copenhagen XI game against the 1958 Brazilian world champions team, which two years earlier had another largely unknown 17-year-old Pelé making his debut on the world stage. The two would meet again playing for their respective club teams later in their careers, but in a strange twist of fates while Pelé was essentially banned from playing outside Brazilian team(s), Nielsen would be banned from playing on the Denmark national team. As the Danish Football Association did not allow professionals to represent the Denmark national team until 1971, Nielsen was banned from the national team at 19 years old when he joined Bologna, and would not play another national team match. This was a great frustration to Harald Nielsen, which he repeatedly voiced in interviews with Danish media.

== Outside football ==
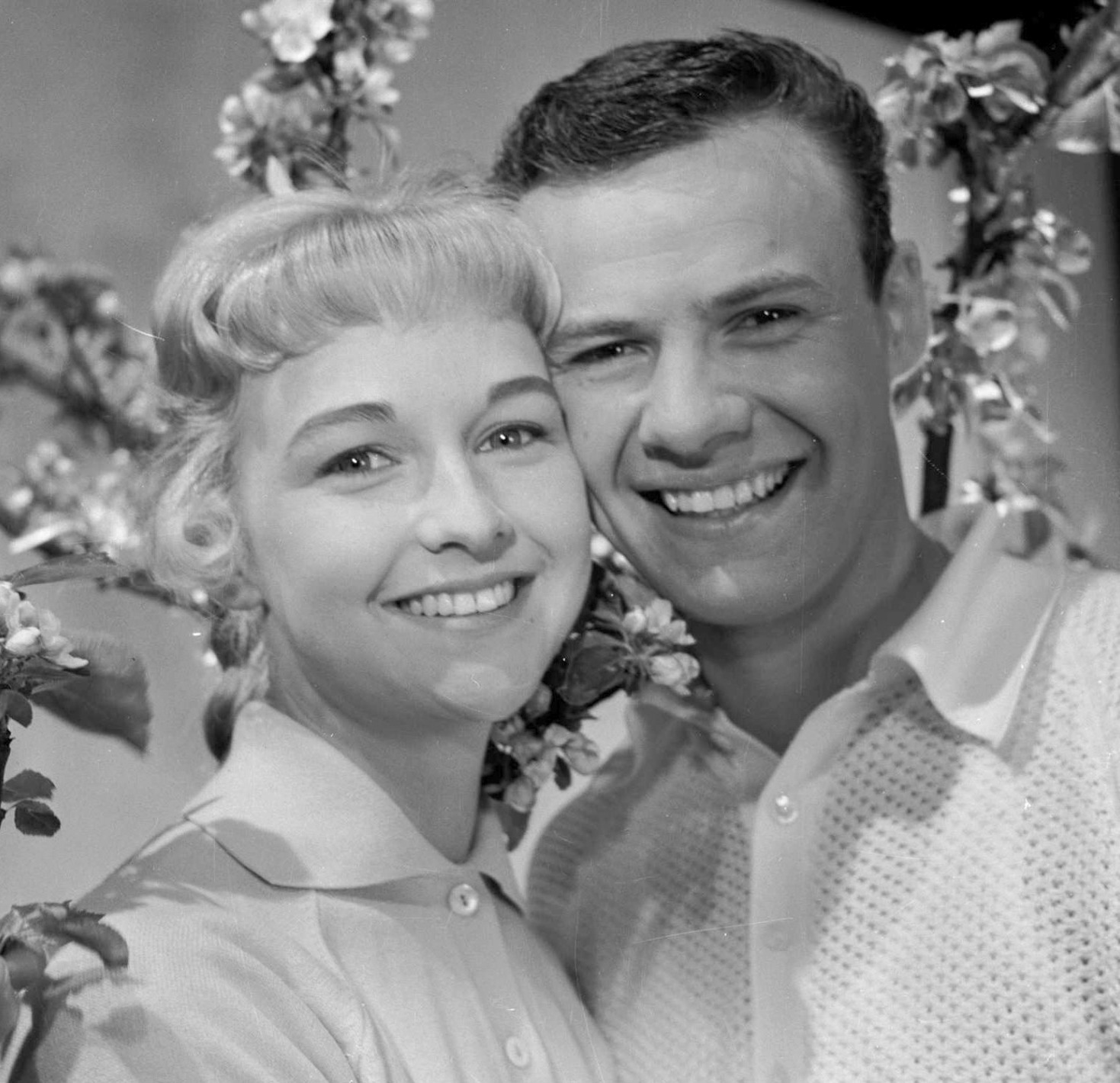
Rudi Hansen and Harald Nielsen in 1961.

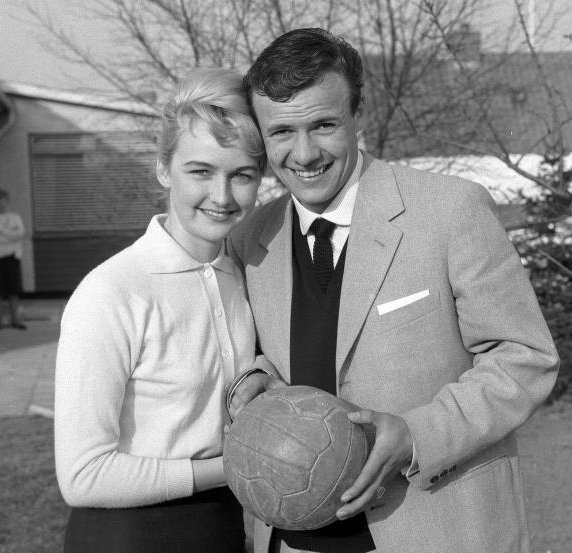
Rudi Hansen and Harald Nielsen

Nielsen was a prolific entrepreneur who started numerous companies. Just after ending his career he started a firm together with his wife, former actress Rudi Nielsen, which imports Italian leather works to Scandinavia. Nielsen and Hansen met on the set of Far til fire med fuld musik in 1961 and married in 1963.

In the 1970s Nielsen became involved in professionalising football in Denmark, and in 1977 he and later Danish Minister of Science Helge Sander planned to found a professional Danish football league. As a consequence of these plans, Danish Football Association finally allowed professional football in Denmark from 1978.

Harald Nielsen along with Alex Friedman founded – and became the first chairman of FC København A/S later Parken Sport & Entertainment whose primary activity was the Danish club FC København from 1992–1997, he stepped down from the board in 2007 and became the clubs first honorary member. He was Protektor for the Legends Club and until his death watched all the home matches of FC København from Parken's A-stand. He was chairman and co-owner/founder of the largest summer house building company in Denmark. He was president of the Rebild National Park Society in 1997–2007. He led the Gunnar Nu Foundation for 18 years until 2009 and presided the distribution of over DKK 9 million to Danish sports in those years. From 2003 until his death, he was chairman/co-owner of ABSI A/S., one of the leading trade and loyalty solutions companies in Scandinavia. He wrote six books during his football career, which became known as the "Harald-Books" during the 1960s. He died on 11 August 2015. On 26 October 2016, which would have been his 75th birthday, the square in front of Arena North, in Frederikshavn, was named the Harald Nielsens Plads in his honor. On 9 July 2018 an 8+ foot tall statue of Harald Nielsen in his youth was unveiled on his square, which is the largest statue of a footballer in Denmark. A prize is now given out each year called “Årets Guld-Harald” in his honor.

== Career statistics ==
Appearances and goals by club, season and competition
Club	Season	League		
Club	Season	Division	Apps	Goals
Bologna	1961–62	Serie A	16	8
Bologna	1962–63	Serie A	29	19
Bologna	1963–64	Serie A	31	21
Bologna	1964–65	Serie A	31	13
Bologna	1965–66	Serie A	29	12
Bologna	1966–67	Serie A	21	8
Inter Milan	1967–68	Serie A	8	2
Napoli	1968–69	Serie A	10	2
Sampdoria	1969–70	Serie A	4	0

== Honours ==
Bologna

- Mitropa Cup (Coupe Centrale D'Europe): 1961–62; runner-up 1962–63
- Italian Serie A Championship: 1963–64

Denmark

- Olympic Silver Medal: Rome 1960

Individual

- Årets Fund (Oldest Danish Sports Prize): 1959
- Danish Championship – Topscorer in the Tournament: 1960 (19 goals)
- Topscorer in the Olympic Football Tournament: Rome 1960 (6 goals)
- First Danish Player of the Year: 1961
- Mitropa Cup Topscorer in the Tournament: 1961–62, 1962–63
- Caltex Sportsman Dell'Anno: 1963–64 on YouTube
- Serie A – Capocannoniere (Topscorer in the tournament): 1962–63 (21 goals), 1963–64 (19 goals)
- Cavaliere/Knight Order of Merit of the Italian Republic: 1992
- Sportens Ridderkors: 2002
- Nettuno d'oro: 2004
- Honorary President Rebild National Park Society: 2007
- First Honorary Member of F.C. Copenhagen: 2007
- Danish Football Hall of Fame: 2010
- Protektor F.C. Copenhagen Legends Club: 2014

== Films ==
- Far til fire med fuld musik, Denmark, 1961 (in Danish)

== Literature ==
- Joakim Jakobsen, "Guld-Harald: Topscorer, Idol, Rebel", Denmark, 2009, ISBN 9788702079357 (in Danish)
- AA.VV. L’enciclopedia dei cento anni: 1909–2009 Bologna football club il secolo rossoblu, Bologna, Minerva Edizioni, 2009 (in Italian)
- John Lindskog, "Kaerlighed A/S – Historien om Guld-Harald og Rudi": Denmark, 2007, ISBN 9788770550727 (in Danish)
- Fabrizio Calzia – Francesco Caremani, "Angeli e Diavoli RossoBlu", Italy, 2003 (in Italian)
