= 1964–65 Serie A =

62nd season of top-tier Italian football

Serie A
- Season: 1964–65
- Dates: 13 September 1964 – 6 June 1965
- Champions: Internazionale; 9th title
- Relegated: Genoa; Messina; Mantova
- European Cup: Internazionale
- Cup Winners' Cup: Juventus
- Inter-Cities Fairs Cup: Milan; Torino; Fiorentina; Roma
- Matches: 306
- Goals: 640 (2.09 per match)
- Top goalscorer: Sandro Mazzola; Alberto Orlando (17 goals each)

The 1964–65 Serie A season was won by Internazionale.

Serie A 1964-65 team distribution

== Teams ==
Varese, Cagliari and Foggia had been promoted from Serie B.

== Final classification ==
Pos	Team	Pld	W	D	L	GF	GA	GD	Pts	Qualification or relegation
1	Internazionale (C)	34	22	10	2	68	29	+39	54	Qualification to European Cup
2	Milan	34	21	9	4	52	23	+29	51	Chosen for Inter-Cities Fairs Cup
3	Torino	34	16	12	6	48	27	+21	44	Chosen for Inter-Cities Fairs Cup
4	Fiorentina	34	16	9	9	52	37	+15	41	Chosen for Inter-Cities Fairs Cup
4	Juventus	34	15	11	8	43	24	+19	41	Qualification to Cup Winners' Cup
6	Bologna	34	11	12	11	43	42	+1	34	
6	Cagliari	34	13	8	13	33	35	−2	34	
8	Catania	34	12	8	14	46	51	−5	32	
9	Foggia	34	10	11	13	26	30	−4	31	
9	Roma	34	8	15	11	29	35	−6	31	Chosen for Inter-Cities Fairs Cup
11	Varese	34	8	14	12	28	37	−9	30	
11	Vicenza	34	10	10	14	33	44	−11	30	
11	Atalanta	34	7	16	11	19	28	−9	30	
14	Lazio	34	8	13	13	25	38	−13	29	
14	Sampdoria	34	9	11	14	19	30	−11	29	
16	Genoa (R)	34	8	12	14	30	46	−16	28	Relegation to Serie B
17	Messina (R)	34	7	8	19	26	44	−18	22	Relegation to Serie B
18	Mantova (R)	34	7	7	20	20	40	−20	21	Relegation to Serie B

Source: Panini
(C) Champions; (R) Relegated

== Results ==
Home \ Away	ATA	BOL	CAG	CTN	FIO	FOG	GEN	INT	JUV	LRV	LAZ	MAN	MES	MIL	ROM	SAM	TOR	VAR
Atalanta		2–0	0–1	0–0	2–1	1–0	0–2	1–3	0–0	1–0	1–1	2–1	0–1	1–1	1–0	0–0	0–0	0–0
Bologna	1–1		1–3	3–0	3–1	4–2	2–1	0–0	1–1	3–0	2–0	4–1	3–0	0–2	1–2	0–1	1–0	3–0
Cagliari	0–1	0–4		2–0	1–1	0–1	2–1	0–2	1–0	2–1	3–0	2–1	2–1	2–1	1–0	1–1	0–1	1–1
Catania	4–1	4–0	2–1		0–2	1–0	3–2	2–3	3–1	2–0	3–0	1–1	4–2	1–1	4–0	1–0	1–1	0–0
Fiorentina	1–0	2–1	2–0	5–0		3–1	5–0	2–2	1–0	4–1	1–0	2–0	1–1	0–0	2–0	0–1	2–0	1–0
Foggia	1–1	2–2	1–2	1–0	0–0		0–0	3–2	1–0	1–0	1–0	1–0	1–0	1–2	0–0	1–1	1–2	3–0
Genoa	0–0	0–0	1–1	1–1	4–1	1–0		1–2	0–1	3–1	1–0	0–0	2–0	0–0	0–0	2–1	1–2	0–1
Internazionale	1–0	2–0	3–0	5–1	6–2	2–0	4–1		1–1	3–2	3–0	1–0	3–1	5–2	0–0	3–2	2–2	0–0
Juventus	0–0	1–0	0–0	4–1	1–0	1–0	7–0	0–2		3–1	0–0	1–0	1–0	2–2	1–0	2–0	1–1	3–2
Vicenza	2–2	1–1	1–0	2–0	1–1	0–1	0–0	1–1	1–3		2–1	1–0	2–1	2–3	1–0	0–0	0–0	3–2
Lazio	0–0	1–1	1–0	2–2	0–1	2–1	1–1	1–1	0–2	0–0		2–0	2–1	0–0	0–0	2–0	1–1	3–1
Mantova	2–0	0–1	2–2	1–0	0–0	0–0	2–0	0–1	1–0	0–1	1–3		2–0	0–4	0–0	1–0	1–2	3–1
Messina	1–0	3–3	0–0	2–1	0–3	0–0	1–0	0–1	1–1	0–0	4–0	2–0		0–2	1–2	2–2	0–1	0–1
Milan	2–0	3–1	1–0	1–1	2–0	1–0	1–0	3–0	1–0	0–1	2–1	2–0	2–0		0–2	3–0	1–1	1–0
Roma	0–0	1–1	2–1	2–1	3–3	1–0	1–1	1–3	1–1	0–0	0–0	0–0	0–1	1–2		1–0	2–2	5–2
Sampdoria	1–0	0–0	1–0	0–1	3–0	1–1	0–1	0–1	1–0	0–3	0–0	1–0	0–0	0–2	1–0		0–0	0–0
Torino	1–1	5–0	4–0	2–1	3–1	0–0	4–1	0–0	0–3	3–0	2–0	2–0	1–0	1–2	3–1	0–1		1–0
Varese	0–0	0–0	0–2	3–0	1–1	0–0	2–2	0–0	1–1	3–2	0–1	1–0	1–0	0–0	1–1	2–0	2–0	

Source: Almanacco Illustrato del Calcio - La Storia 1898-2004, Panini Edizioni, Modena, September 2005 (in Italian)
Legend: Blue = home team win; Yellow = draw; Red = away team win.

== Top goalscorers ==
Rank	Player	Club	Goals
1	(Italy) Sandro Mazzola	Internazionale	17
1	(Italy) Alberto Orlando	Fiorentina	17
3	(Brazil) Amarildo	Milan	15
4	(Italy) Carlo Facchin	Catania	13
4	(Denmark) Harald Nielsen	Bologna	13
6	(Brazil) Luís Vinício	Vicenza	12
6	(Italy) Giancarlo Danova	Catania	12
6	(Italy) Paolo Ferrario	Milan	12
9	(Germany) Helmut Haller	Bologna	11
9	(Italy) Giampaolo Menichelli	Juventus	11
11	(Italy) Giorgio Ferrini	Torino	10
11	(Italy) Luigi Simoni	Torino	10
11	(Brazil) Jair da Costa	Internazionale	10
11	(Italy) Romano Bagatti	Messina	10
11	(Italy) Cosimo Nocera	Foggia	10

== Attendances ==
#	Club	Average
1	Internazionale	45,012
2	Milan	37,733
3	Roma	30,176
4	Bologna	25,774
5	Juventus	25,666
6	Torino	24,336
7	Fiorentina	21,575
8	Lazio	20,730
9	Cagliari	18,092
10	Atalanta	17,245
11	Genoa	17,112
12	Sampdoria	15,339
13	Foggia	14,582
14	Catania	12,656
15	Mantova	11,086
16	Messina	10,242
17	Varese	9,634
18	Vicenza	8,781

== References and sources ==
- Almanacco Illustrato del Calcio - La Storia 1898-2004, Panini Edizioni, Modena, September 2005
