= Nicola Ciccolo =

Italian footballer and coach

Personal information
- Date of birth: September 10, 1940 (age 86)
- Place of birth: Taranto, Italy
- Height: 1.72 m (5 ft 7 1/2 in)
- Position: Striker

Senior career*
Years	Team	Apps	(Gls)
1957–1962	Messina	90	(27)
1962–1963	Verona	34	(17)
1963–1964	Internazionale	10	(4)
1964–1965	Mantova	25	(9)
1965–1966	Lazio	27	(5)
1966–1972	L.R. Vicenza	86	(8)
1972–1973	Verona	16	(0)
1974–1978	Chievo		
1978–1979	Legnago Salus		

Managerial career
- 1974–1978: Chievo
- * Club domestic league appearances and goals

Nicola Ciccolo (born September 10, 1940, in Taranto) is a retired Italian professional football player and coach.

== Honours ==
Inter de Milán

- Europea Cup: 1962–63
