= Bruno Petroni =

Italian footballer (1941-2014)

Personal information
- Date of birth: 16 October 1941
- Place of birth: Acqualagna, Italy
- Date of death: 15 August 2014 (aged 72)
- Place of death: Milan, Italy
- Height: 1.74 m (5 ft 8 1/2 in)
- Position: Striker

Team information
- Current team: Burkina Faso FC

Senior career*
| Years | Team | Apps | (Gls) |
| 1961–1964 | Internazionale | 11 | (3) |
| 1962–1963 | → Catania (loan) | 28 | (11) |
| 1964–1965 | Atalanta | 26 | (7) |
| 1965–1966 | Catania | 23 | (3) |
| 1966–1968 | Genoa | 26 | (2) |
| 1968–1969 | Rapallo Ruentes | 29 | (2) |
| 1969 | Acquapozzillo | 7 | (0) |
| 1970–1972 | Rapallo Ruentes | | |
- * Club domestic league appearances and goals

Bruno Petroni (16 October 1941 in Acqualagna – 15 August 2014) was an Italian professional footballer who played as a forward.

== Honours ==
Individual

- Coppa Italia top scorer: 1964–65 (3 goals).
