= Jair da Costa =

Brazilian footballer (1940–2025)

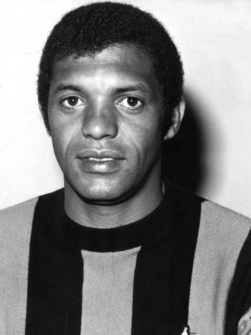
- Jair in 1963

Personal information
- Date of birth: 9 July 1940
- Place of birth: Santo André, São Paulo, Brazil
- Date of death: 26 April 2025 (aged 84)
- Place of death: Osasco, São Paulo, Brazil
- Height: 1.73 m (5 ft 8 in)
- Position: Right winger

Senior career*
Years	Team	Apps	(Gls)
1960–1962	Portuguesa		
1962–1967	Inter Milan	119	(39)
1967–1968	Roma	23	(2)
1968–1972	Inter Milan	80	(14)
1972–1974	Santos	19	(3)
1975	Windsor Star		

International career
1962	Brazil	1	(0)
Medal record
Men's Football
Representing Brazil
FIFA World Cup
Winner	1962 Chile
- * Club domestic league appearances and goals

Jair da Costa ([ʒaˈiʁ da ˈkɔsta]; 9 July 1940 – 26 April 2025), known simply as Jair, was a Brazilian professional footballer who played as a right winger. Apart from playing in Brazil, he played professionally in clubs in Italy, where his teams won the European Cup and the Intercontinental Cup several times, as well as in Canada. Internationally, he briefly played for the Brazil national team. He was a member of the Brazilian team that won the 1962 FIFA World Cup, but he did not play in the World Cup.

== Club career ==
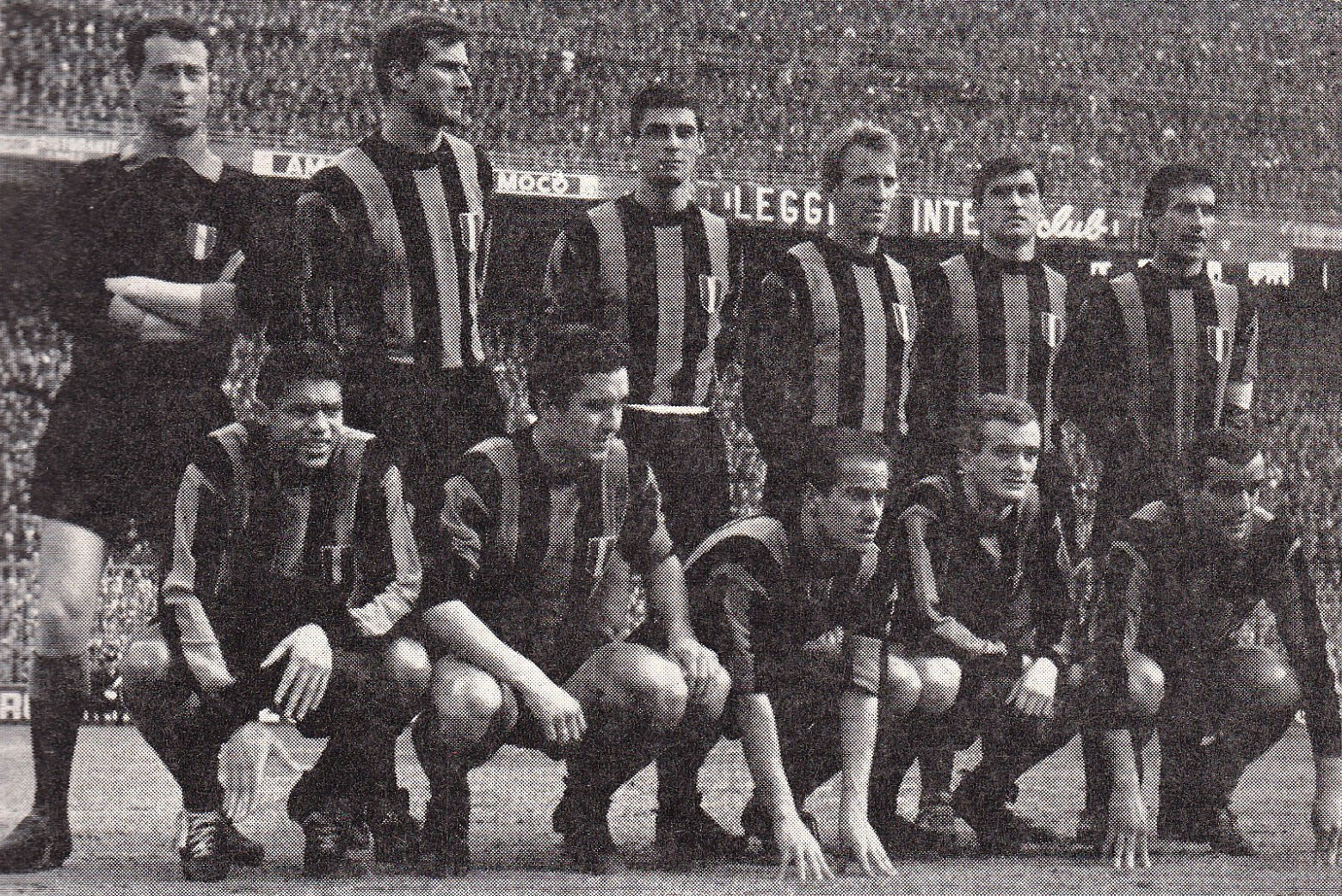
Jair (bottom row, first from left) with Inter Milan in the 1963–64 season

Jair da Costa started his club career with Portuguesa as a youth, making his senior debut against XV Novembro de Jaú. Whilst with Portuguesa he helped them to the runners-up spot in the 1960 Campeonato Paulista.

Jair da Costa moved to the Italian side Inter Milan in November 1962, and went on to play a total of 260 senior games for the Milan club in two spells (1962–1967 and 1968–1972). He was notably a key member of Helenio Herrera's Grande Inter squad on the right wing, and won four Serie A titles (two of which were won consecutively), and two European Cups in 1964 and 1965, as well as consecutive Intercontinental Cups in 1964 and 1965, during his time at the club. He became not only the first Brazilian player to win multiple European Cups, but also the first Brazilian player to win multiple Intercontinental Cups with a European team.

In between his two spells with Inter, Jair da Costa also spent the 1967–68 season with Roma. Following his time in Italy, he later returned to Brazil in 1972 and played for Santos until 1974, winning the Campeonato Paulista in 1973. He ended his career in Canada's National Soccer League in 1975, with Windsor Star.

== International career ==
At international level, Jair da Costa obtained but one cap for the Brazil national team, due to the presence of Garrincha in his position; his only appearance came in a 3–1 friendly win over Wales in São Paulo, on 16 May 1962. He was also a non-playing member of the Brazilian team that won the 1962 FIFA World Cup.

== Style of play ==
An extremely fast and agile winger, with quick feet and technicality, Jair da Costa was also known for his striking ability and his great pace on the ball; due to these abilities, he was also capable of functioning as a striker. He was also known for his dribbling skills and use of elaborate feints.

== Death ==
Da Costa died in Osasco, São Paulo on 26 April 2025, at the age of 84.

== Honours ==
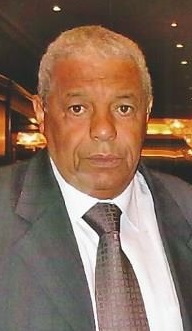
Jair in 2008

Inter Milan

- Serie A: 1962–63, 1964–65, 1965–66, 1970–71
- European Cup: 1963–64, 1964–65
- Intercontinental Cup: 1964, 1965

Santos

- Campeonato Paulista: 1973

Brazil

- FIFA World Cup: 1962
