= 1962–63 Serie A =

60th season of top-tier Italian football

Serie A
- Season: 1962–63
- Dates: 16 September 1962 – 26 May 1963
- Champions: Internazionale; 8th title
- Relegated: Napoli; Venezia; Palermo
- European Cup: Internazionale; Milan
- Cup Winners' Cup: Atalanta
- Inter-Cities Fairs Cup: Juventus; Roma
- Matches: 306
- Goals: 741 (2.42 per match)
- Top goalscorer: Harald Nielsen; Pedro Manfredini (19 goals each)

The 1962–63 Serie A season was won by Internazionale.

Serie A 1962-63 team distribution

== Teams ==
Genoa, Napoli and Modena had been promoted from Serie B.

== Final classification ==
Pos	Team	Pld	W	D	L	GF	GA	GD	Pts	Qualification or relegation
1	Internazionale (C)	34	19	11	4	56	20	+36	49	Qualification to European Cup
2	Juventus	34	18	9	7	50	25	+25	45	Chosen for Inter-Cities Fairs Cup
3	Milan	34	15	13	6	53	27	+26	43	Qualification to European Cup (Note: Qualified as defending champions)
4	Bologna	34	17	8	9	58	39	+19	42	
5	Roma	34	13	14	7	57	32	+25	40	Chosen for Inter-Cities Fairs Cup
6	Fiorentina	34	15	8	11	52	32	+20	38	
7	Vicenza	34	13	10	11	35	35	0	36	
8	Atalanta	34	12	10	12	43	44	−1	34	Qualification to Cup Winners' Cup
8	SPAL	34	12	10	12	36	38	−2	34	
8	Torino	34	12	10	12	34	38	−4	34	
11	Sampdoria	34	11	8	15	41	50	−9	30	
11	Modena	34	10	10	14	36	47	−11	30	
11	Mantova	34	8	14	12	34	46	−12	30	
11	Catania	34	10	10	14	35	56	−21	30	
15	Genoa	34	9	10	15	32	48	−16	28	
16	Napoli (R)	34	9	9	16	35	59	−24	27	Relegation to Serie B
17	Venezia (R)	34	6	10	18	36	51	−15	22	Relegation to Serie B
18	Palermo (R)	34	5	10	19	18	54	−36	20	Relegation to Serie B

Source: Panini
(C) Champions; (R) Relegated

== Results ==
Home \ Away	ATA	BOL	CTN	FIO	GEN	INT	JUV	LRV	MAN	MIL	MOD	NAP	PAL	ROM	SAM	SPA	TOR	VEN
Atalanta		1–3	0–0	0–1	1–1	1–0	3–6	3–1	2–2	2–2	2–1	2–1	1–0	3–1	1–1	1–0	0–0	2–2
Bologna	1–0		5–0	2–1	1–1	0–4	1–2	2–1	2–2	1–2	7–1	4–2	4–0	0–0	4–1	4–1	1–0	0–0
Catania	2–0	1–1		0–1	3–1	1–0	1–5	1–0	1–1	1–0	3–2	1–0	0–0	0–0	0–1	0–0	3–0	3–2
Fiorentina	2–0	3–1	3–0		5–0	1–1	1–0	1–1	5–0	0–1	1–2	5–1	3–1	1–1	1–1	2–0	1–0	1–4
Genoa	2–1	1–0	4–1	1–2		1–3	0–0	2–0	0–0	0–1	1–1	3–2	5–0	2–2	2–1	0–0	1–0	2–0
Internazionale	1–2	4–1	2–1	1–0	6–0		1–0	1–0	1–0	1–1	0–0	1–0	4–0	2–0	4–0	3–2	1–1	2–0
Juventus	2–3	3–1	0–1	0–0	2–0	0–1		2–0	2–0	1–0	2–1	1–0	2–1	2–0	3–0	2–2	0–1	2–1
Vicenza	2–2	0–0	3–1	1–0	1–0	1–2	1–3		4–2	2–0	1–0	0–0	1–0	0–0	3–0	1–0	0–1	0–0
Mantova	0–1	0–1	3–1	1–1	2–0	0–0	0–0	0–0		1–3	3–0	2–1	1–0	1–0	3–1	0–1	1–1	2–0
Milan	0–0	3–1	0–0	0–0	1–0	1–1	0–0	6–1	2–2		4–0	0–1	2–0	0–1	1–1	4–0	2–1	3–3
Modena	0–2	0–1	4–1	3–0	1–1	0–0	0–0	0–0	0–0	2–2		4–0	2–0	1–3	1–0	1–0	1–0	2–1
Napoli	2–1	0–0	3–2	2–0	1–0	1–5	0–0	1–0	0–0	1–5	0–2		3–1	3–3	0–2	2–0	2–2	1–0
Palermo	1–0	0–0	1–1	1–0	0–0	1–1	1–1	1–1	1–0	1–3	2–2	1–1		0–4	1–1	0–1	0–1	2–1
Roma	1–1	3–1	5–1	2–2	1–0	3–0	1–1	0–1	7–1	0–1	2–0	3–0	2–0		2–0	0–0	5–0	2–2
Sampdoria	2–0	2–3	4–0	1–0	3–1	0–0	2–1	1–3	2–2	2–1	1–1	3–0	2–0	0–0		0–1	1–3	3–1
SPAL	2–5	0–1	2–2	3–1	4–0	0–0	0–2	1–1	1–1	0–0	1–0	4–2	1–0	3–0	1–0		2–0	1–1
Torino	1–0	0–1	1–1	0–4	2–0	1–1	0–1	1–2	1–0	0–0	2–0	1–1	3–0	2–2	4–2	2–1		1–0
Venezia	1–0	0–3	2–1	0–3	0–0	0–2	1–2	1–2	4–1	0–2	4–1	1–1	0–1	1–1	2–0	0–1	1–1	

Source: Almanacco Illustrato del Calcio - La Storia 1898-2004, Panini Edizioni, Modena, September 2005 (in Italian)
Legend: Blue = home team win; Yellow = draw; Red = away team win.

== Top goalscorers ==
Rank	Player	Club	Goals
1	(Denmark) Harald Nielsen	Bologna	19
1	(Argentina) Pedro Manfredini	Roma	19
3	(Argentina) (Italy) Omar Sívori	Juventus	16
4	(Sweden) Kurt Hamrin	Fiorentina	15
5	(Italy) Ezio Pascutti	Bologna	13
5	(Italy) Angelo Sormani	Mantova	13
5	(Brazil) China	Sampdoria	13
5	(Italy) Beniamino Di Giacomo	Torino, Internazionale	13
9	(Brazil) Dino da Costa	Atalanta	12
9	(Brazil) Armando Miranda	Juventus	12
11	(Brazil) (Italy) José Altafini	Milan	11
11	(Italy) Gino Raffin	Venezia	11
11	(England) Gerry Hitchens	Internazionale, Torino	11
11	(Italy) Bruno Petroni	Catania	11
15	(Brazil) Jair da Costa	Internazionale	10
15	(Italy) Sandro Mazzola	Internazionale	10
15	(Italy) Giorgio Puia	Vicenza	10
15	(Peru) Juan Seminario	Fiorentina	10

== Attendances ==
#	Club	Average
1	Internazionale	46,637
2	Milan	43,614
3	Napoli	38,039
4	Roma	37,248
5	Juventus	31,002
6	Torino	23,877
7	Bologna	22,865
8	Fiorentina	20,645
9	Genoa	19,049
10	Sampdoria	16,630
11	Modena	16,271
12	Atalanta	15,168
13	Mantova	15,123
14	Catania	12,882
15	Venezia	11,837
16	SPAL	11,286
17	Palermo	10,908
18	Vicenza	9,452

== References and sources ==
- Almanacco Illustrato del Calcio - La Storia 1898-2004, Panini Edizioni, Modena, September 2005
