= 1969–70 Cagliari Calcio season =

Unione Sportiva Cagliari
1969–70 season
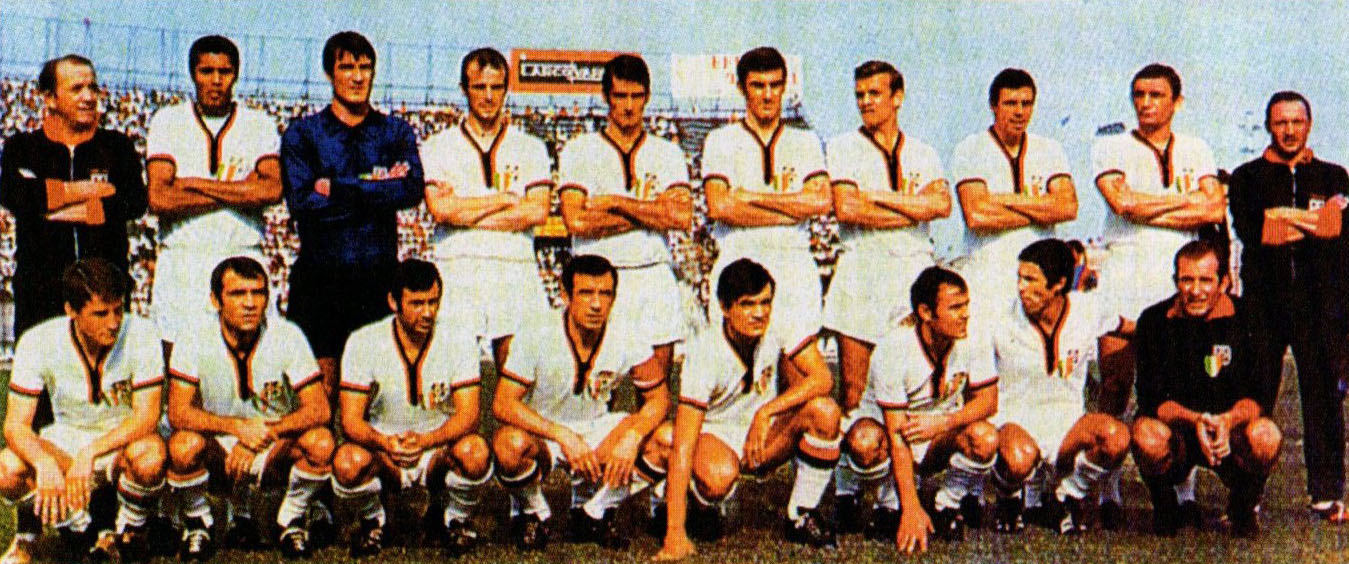
- Chairman: Efisio Corrias
- Manager: Manlio Scopigno
- Stadium: Amsicora (28,000)
- Serie A: 1st (in European Cup)
- Coppa Italia: 3rd
- Fairs Cup: Round of 32
- Top goalscorer: League: Riva (21); All: Riva (27)
Home colours	Away colours	Third colours

During the 1969–70 season Cagliari Calcio (then Unione Sportiva Cagliari) competed in Serie A, Coppa Italia and Fairs Cup. Cagliari's performance in the 1969–70 Serie A campaign is widely regarded as one of the best performing defences over a domestic league season. Cagliari's 1969–70 team still hold the record of only conceding 11 goals in a league season at a rate of 0.367 goals per game, the best of any team in history across Europe's Big Five leagues.

== Summary ==
In 1970, the boot was on the other foot as Gigi Riva led Unione Sportiva Cagliari with 21 goals in 30 games helped the Sardinian side win their only Serie A title.

Having spent most of the 1950s mired in Serie B, Riva’s arrival in 1964 galvanised the team and was a magnet for other players to leave more fashionable clubs to head to Sardinia such as goalkeeper Enrico Albertosi (Fiorentina) and midfielder Angelo Domenghini (Inter).

After the team clinched the title, Italian national team manager Ferruccio Valcareggi called six players from this Cagliari squad — Albertosi, Domenghini, Gori, Riva, Comunardo Niccolai and Pierluigi Cera — to the 1970 FIFA World Cup in Mexico, where they reached a decent 2nd place.

== Squad ==
Note: Flags indicate national team as defined under FIFA eligibility rules; some limited exceptions apply. Players may hold more than one non-FIFA nationality.

Pos.	Nation	Player
GK	ITA	Enrico Albertosi
GK	ITA	Adriano Reginato
GK	ITA	Moriano Tampucci
DF	ITA	Pierluigi Cera
DF	ITA	Salvatore Ferru
DF	ITA	Eraldo Mancin
DF	ITA	Mario Martiradonna
DF	ITA	Comunardo Niccolai
DF	ITA	Renato Roffi
DF	ITA	Roberto Sulis
DF	ITA	Giuseppe Tomasini
DF	ITA	Giulio Zignoli
MF	ITA	Renzo Bonelli

Pos.	Nation	Player
MF	ITA	Mario Brugnera
MF	ITA	Antonio Chessa
MF	ITA	Angelo Domenghini
MF	ITA	Ricciotti Greatti
MF	BRA	Nené
MF	ITA	Sergio Nocera
MF	ITA	Cesare Poli
FW	ITA	Nino Cuttuogno
FW	ITA	Sergio Gori
FW	ITA	Corrado Nastasio
FW	ITA	Vittorio Petta
FW	ITA	Gigi Riva
FW	ITA	Claudio Taddeini

== Pre-season and friendlies ==
20 August 1969 Friendly	Triestina	1–4	Cagliari	Milan, Italy
	Ridolfi 43'	Report	Riva 4' 20' 37'; Gori 53'	Stadium: Stadio Giuseppe Grezar; Attendance: 2.000 ca Referee: Casarin

24 August 1969 Friendly	Inter	0–0	Cagliari	Milan, Italy
		Report		Stadium: Stadio Stadio San Siro; Attendance: 31.794; Referee: Picasso

== Competitions ==
=== Serie A ===
==== League table ====
Pos	Team	Pld	W	D	L	GF	GA	GD	Pts	Qualification or relegation
1	Cagliari (C)	30	17	11	2	42	11	+31	45	Qualification to European Cup
2	Internazionale	30	16	9	5	41	19	+22	41	Qualified to Inter-Cities Fairs Cup
3	Juventus	30	15	8	7	43	20	+23	38	Qualified to Inter-Cities Fairs Cup
4	Milan	30	13	10	7	38	24	+14	36	(Note: Milan not qualified to the ICFC consequently to Inter qualification.)
5	Fiorentina	30	15	6	9	40	33	+7	36	Qualified to Inter-Cities Fairs Cup

Source: Panini
(C) Champions

==== Matches ====
14 September 1969 1	Sampdoria	0–0	Cagliari	Genoa
15:30 CEST		Report		Stadium: Stadio Luigi Ferraris; Referee: Motta

21 September 1969 2	Cagliari	2–1	Lanerossi	Cagliari
15:30 CEST	Domenghini 9'; Riva 42'	Report	84' Facchin	Stadium: Stadio Amsicora; Referee: Torelli

28 September 1969 3	Brescia	0–2	Cagliari	Brescia
15:30 CEST		Report	47' Domenghini; 80' Riva	Stadium: Stadio Mario Rigamonti; Referee: Francescon

5 October 1969 4	Cagliari	1–0	Lazio	Cagliari
15:30 CEST	Brugnera 63'	Report		Stadium: Stadio Amsicora; Referee: Carminati

12 October 1969 5	Fiorentina	0–1	Cagliari	Florence
15:30 CEST		Report	21' (pen.) Riva	Stadium: Stadio Comunale; Referee: Concetto Lo Bello

19 October 1969 6	Cagliari	1–1	Inter Milan	Cagliari
15:30 CEST	Nené 50'	Report	7' Suarez	Stadium: Stadio Amsicora; Referee: Sbardella

26 October 1969 7	Napoli	0–2	Cagliari	Naples
15:30 CEST		Report	16', 80' Riva	Stadium: Stadio San Paolo; Referee: Alberto Picasso

9 November 1969 8	Cagliari	1–0	Roma	Cagliari
15:30 CET	Nené 38'	Report		Stadium: Stadio Amsicora; Referee: Francesco Francescon

16 November 1969 9	Cagliari	1–1	Juventus	Cagliari
15:30 CET	Domenghini 47'	Report	89' Cuccureddu	Stadium: Stadio Amsicora; Referee: Bernardis

30 November 1969 10	Hellas Verona	1–1	Cagliari	Verona
15:30 CET	Domenghini 21' (o.g.)	Report	84' Greatti	Stadium: Stadio Marcantonio Bentegodi; Referee: Riccardo Lattanzi

7 December 1969 11	Cagliari	1–0	Bologna	Cagliari
15:30 CET	Riva 37'	Report		Stadium: Stadio Amsicora; Referee: Concetto Lo Bello

14 December 1969 12	Palermo	1–0	Cagliari	Palermo
15:30 CET	Troja 40'	Report		Stadium: Stadio La Favorita; Referee: Paolo Toselli

21 December 1969 13	AS Bari	0–0	Cagliari	Bari
15:30 CET		Report		Stadium: Stadio della Vittoria; Referee: Sbardella

28 December 1969 14	Cagliari	1–1	AC Milan	Cagliari
15:30 CET	Riva 4'	Report	71' Prati	Stadium: Stadio Amsicora; Referee: D'Agostini

4 January 1970 15	Cagliari	2–0	Torino	Cagliari
15:30 CET	Gori 44'; Riva 85'	Report		Stadium: Stadio Amsicora; Referee: Mascali

11 January 1970 16	Cagliari	4–0	Sampdoria	Cagliari
15:30 CET	Domenghini 3', 87'; Riva 76'; Gori 78'	Report		Stadium: Stadio Amsicora; Referee: Michelotti

18 January 1970 17	Lanerossi	1–2	Cagliari	Vicenza
15:30 CET	Vitali 82'	Report	10', 70' Riva	Stadium: Stadio Romeo Menti; Referee: Gonella

25 January 1970 18	Cagliari	4–0	Brescia	Cagliari
15:30 CET	Gori 14'; Brugnera 29', 78'; Riva 60'	Report		Stadium: Stadio Amsicora; Referee: Enzo Barbaresco

1 February 1970 19	Lazio	0–2	Cagliari	Rome
15:30 CET		Report	55' Domenghini; 80' Riva	Stadium: Stadio Olimpico; Referee: Francesco Francescon

8 February 1970 20	Cagliari	0–0	Fiorentina	Cagliari
15:30 CET		Report		Stadium: Stadio Amsicora; Referee: Ettore Carminati

15 February 1970 21	Inter Milan	1–0	Cagliari	Milan
15:30 CET	Boninsegna 84'	Report		Stadium: Stadio San Siro; Referee: Antonio Sbardella

1 March 1970 22	Cagliari	2–0	Napoli	Cagliari
15:30 CET	Gori 42'; Riva 64' (pen.)	Report		Stadium: Stadio Amsicora; Referee: Alessandro D'Agostini

8 March 1970 23	Roma	1–1	Cagliari	Rome
15:30 CET	Peiró 11'	Report	26' Domenghini	Stadium: Stadio Olimpico; Referee: Aurelio Angonese

15 March 1970 24	Juventus	2–2	Cagliari	Turin
15:30 CET	Niccolai 29' (o.g.); Anastasi 66' (pen.)	Report	45', 82' (pen.) Riva	Stadium: Stadio Comunale; Referee: Concetto Lo Bello

22 March 1970 25	Cagliari	1–0	Hellas Verona	Cagliari
15:30 CET	Riva 87' (pen.)	Report		Stadium: Stadio Amsicora; Referee: Picasso

29 March 1970 26	Bologna	0–0	Cagliari	Bologna
15:30 CET		Report		Stadium: Comunale; Referee: Ettore Carminati

5 April 1970 27	Cagliari	2–0	Palermo	Cagliari
15:30 CEST	Riva 41'; Nenè 59'	Report		Stadium: Stadio Amsicora; Referee: Riccardo Lattanzi

12 April 1970 28	Cagliari	2–0	Bari	Cagliari
15:30 CEST	Riva 39'; Gori 88'	Report		Stadium: Stadio Amsicora; Referee: Francesco De Robbio

19 April 1970 29	Milan	0–0	Cagliari	Milan
15:30 CEST		Report		Stadium: San Siro; Referee: Bruno De Marchi

26 April 1970 30	Torino	0–4	Cagliari	Turin
15:30 CEST		Report	12' Domenghini; 29', 38' Riva; 48' Gori	Stadium: Stadio Comunale; Referee: Giangaetano Vacchini

=== Coppa Italia ===
==== First round ====
31 August 1969 1	Catanzaro	0–1	Cagliari	Catanzaro
		Report	78' (pen.) Riva	Stadium: Stadio Militare; Referee: Di Tonno

3 September 1969 2	Cagliari	3–0	Palermo	Cagliari
	Brugnera 42', 62'; Riva 47'	Report		Stadium: Stadio Amsicora; Referee: Gussoni

7 September 1969 3	Cagliari	2–2	Catania	Cagliari
	Riva 48'; Cera 57'	Report	80', 90' Reggiani	Stadium: Stadio Amsicora; Referee: Calì

==== Quarterfinals ====
31 December 1969	Roma	0–1	Cagliari	Rome
		Report	24' Riva	Stadium: Stadio Olimpico; Referee: Torelli

24 February 1970	Cagliari	2–0	Roma	Cagliari
	Mancin 63'; Riva 84'	Report		Stadium: Stadio Amsicora; Referee: Luciano Giunti

==== Final round ====
7 May 1970 1	Cagliari	1–0	Torino	Cagliari
	Nené 70'	Report		Stadium: Stadio Amsicora; Referee: Alessandro D'Agostini

13 May 1970 2	Bologna	0–0	Cagliari	Bologna
		Report		Stadium: Stadio Comunale; Referee: Bruno De Marchi

20 May 1970 3	Varese	1–1	Cagliari	Varese
		Report		Stadium: Stadio Franco Ossola; Referee: Fabio Monti

27 May 1970 4	Torino	4–3	Cagliari	Turin
	Ferrini 2'; Mondonico 11'; Sala 47'; Pulici 69'	Report	11' Brugnera; 63' (pen.), 79' Nené	Stadium: Stadio Comunale; Referee: Carminati

2 June 1970 5	Cagliari	0–4	Bologna	Cagliari
		Report	24' Savoldi; 60' (o.g.) Nené; 70', 85' Bulgarelli	Stadium: Stadio Amsicora; Referee: Angonese

10 June 1970 6	Cagliari	0–0	Varese	Cagliari
		Report		Stadium: Stadio Amsicora; Referee: Mascali

=== Fairs Cup ===
==== First round ====
17 September 1969	Aris Thessaloniki (Greece)	1–1	Cagliari	Saloniki
	Spyridon 12'	Report	82' Martiradonna	Stadium: Aris Stadium; Attendance: 10,000; Referee: (Socialist Federal Republic of Yugoslavia) Čanak

1 October 1969	Cagliari	3–0	(Greece) Aris Thessaloniki	Cagliari
	Domenghini 10'; Riva 13'; Gori 76' (pen.)	Report		Stadium: Stadio Amsicora; Attendance: 15,000; Referee: (Switzerland) Despland

==== Round of 32 ====
12 November 1969	(East Germany) FC Carl Zeiss Jena	2–0	Cagliari	Jena
	Rock 63'; Irmscher 73' (pen.)	Report		Stadium: Ernst-Abbe-Sportfeld; Attendance: 18,000; Referee: (Austria) Schiller

26 November 1969	Cagliari	0–1	(East Germany) FC Carl Zeiss Jena	Cagliari
		Report	9' Stein	Stadium: Stadio Amsicora; Attendance: 5,900; Referee: (Spain) Zariquiegui Izco
