= 1970–71 Cagliari Calcio season =

Unione Sportiva Cagliari
1970–71 season
- Chairman: Efisio Corrias
- Manager: Manlio Scopigno
- Stadium: Sant'Elia
- Serie A: 7th
- Coppa Italia: First round
- European Cup: Eightfinals
- Top goalscorer: League: Angelo Domenghini (8); Riva (8); All: Luigi Riva (16)
Home colours	Away colours	Third colours

During the 1970–71 season Cagliari Calcio (then Unione Sportiva Cagliari) competed in Serie A, Coppa Italia and 1970–71 European Cup.

== Summary ==
The squad had a promising start of league campaign defeating Sampdoria (2–1), SS Lazio (2–4) and Inter (1–3) at San Siro. However, superstar Luigi Riva is injured at minute 76 on 31 October 1970 playing a Euro 1972 qualification match against Austria (2–1) by Austrian Defender Norbert Hof. The club transferred in Forward Giampaolo Menichelli, resulting in a flop only playing 8 matches without goal. Riva did not make a comeback to the squad until Spring with the team collapsed to a disappointing 7th place.

The season is best remembered by the club debut on the European Cup. In first round the squad defeated the French franchise AS Saint-Étienne with a global score of 3–1. In eightfinals the team won his first leg against Atlético Madrid by 2–1. For the second leg of the series at Manzanares, the club without Gigi Riva lost the match 3-0 being eliminated from the tournament.

In Coppa Italia the team surprisingly was early eliminated on first round after losing the first grupo match against Livorno in spite of two consecutive victories.

The club left the Stadio Amsicora after 50 years, replaced it by Stadio Sant'Elia on 12 September 1970.

In spite of the chaotic campaign, Eraldo Mancin became starter; Brazilian Nenè delivered a decent season, with 30 matches played no-replaced. Also, Angelo Domenghini, played at high-level during the entire season.

== Squad ==
Note: Flags indicate national team as defined under FIFA eligibility rules; some limited exceptions apply. Players may hold more than one non-FIFA nationality.

Pos.	Nation	Player
GK	ITA	Enrico Albertosi
GK	ITA	Adriano Reginato
GK	ITA	Moriano Tampucci
DF	ITA	Pierluigi Cera (Captain)
DF	ITA	Eraldo Mancin
DF	ITA	Mario Martiradonna
DF	ITA	Comunardo Niccolai
DF	ITA	Giuseppe Tomasini
DF	ITA	Roberto De Petri

Pos.	Nation	Player
MF	ITA	Mario Brugnera
MF	ITA	Angelo Domenghini
MF	ITA	Ricciotti Greatti
MF	BRA	Nené
MF	ITA	Cesare Poli
FW	ITA	Giampaolo Menichelli
FW	ITA	Sergio Gori
FW	ITA	Corrado Nastasio
FW	ITA	Gigi Riva

=== Transfers ===
In
Pos.	Name	To	Type
DF	Roberto De Petri	Vicenza	
FW	Giampaolo Menichelli	Brescia	

Out
Pos.	Name	from	Type
DF	Giulio Zignoli	Milan	
DF	Riccardo Dessì	Tharros	loan
DF	Salvatore Ferru		
DF	Renato Roffi		
DF	Roberto Sulis		
MF	Renzo Bonelli		
MF	Antonio Chessa		
MF	Sergio Nocera		
FW	Nino Cuttuogno		
FW	Vittorio Petta		
FW	Claudio Taddeini		

== Competitions ==
=== Serie A ===
==== League table ====
Pos	Team	Pld	W	D	L	GF	GA	GD	Pts	Qualification or relegation
5	Bologna	30	10	14	6	30	24	+6	34	Qualification to UEFA Cup
6	Roma	30	7	18	5	32	25	+7	32	
7	Cagliari	30	8	14	8	33	35	−2	30	
8	Torino	30	6	14	10	27	30	−3	26	Qualification to Cup Winners' Cup
9	Varese	30	5	16	9	29	33	−4	26	

Source: Panini

==== Results by round ====
Round	1	2	3	4	5	6	7	8	9	10	11	12	13	14	15	16	17	18	19	20	21	22	23	24	25	26	27	28	29	30
Ground	H	A	H	A	H	A	H	A	H	A	H	H	A	A	H	A	H	A	H	A	H	A	H	A	H	A	A	H	H	A
Result	W	W	D	W	D	L	W	D	D	W	D	D	L	L	L	D	W	L	D	D	D	W	D	L	D	D	L	D	L	W
Position	1	1	1	1	2	3	3	3	4	3	3	3	4	5	6	6	5	6	5	5	6	6	6	6	7	7	7	7	7	7

Source: http://calcio-seriea.net/allenatori_squadra/1969/662/
A = Away; H = Home; W = Win; D = Draw; L = Loss; = Leader, 1971-72 European Cup; = 1971–72 UEFA Cup

==== Matches ====
27 September 1970 1	Cagliari	2–1	Sampdoria	Cagliari
	Riva 76' (pen.); Brugnera 79'		67' Salvi	Stadium: Sant'Elia; Referee: Motta

7 October 1970 2	Lazio	2–4	Cagliari	Rome
	Legnaro 28'; Chinaglia 72'		1', 61' Domenghini; 23' Riva; 79'’ Gori	Stadium: Olimpico; Referee: Angonese

11 October 1970 3	Cagliari	1 – 1	Varese	Cagliari
	Niccolai 15'		10'’ Bonatti	Stadium: Sant'Elia; Referee: Picasso

25 October 1970 4	Inter	1–3	Cagliari	Milan
	Mazzola 88'		7', 21' Riva; 79' Domenghini	Stadium: San Siro; Referee: Lo Bello

8 November 1970 5	Cagliari	1–1	Foggia	Cagliari
	Domenghini 40' (pen.)		4' Bigon	Stadium: Sant'Elia; Referee: Gussoni

15 November 1970 6	Juventus	2–1	Cagliari	Turin
	Anastasi 24', 90'		47' Gori	Stadium: Comunale; Referee: Sbardella (Rome)

22 November 1970 7	Cagliari	2–0	Fiorentina	Cagliari
	Martiradonna 13'; Nené 30'			Stadium: Sant'Elia; Referee: Lo Bello

29 November 1970 8	Lanerossi Vicenza	1–1	Cagliari	Vicenza
	Ciccolo 90'		34' (o.g.) Castano	Stadium: Romeo Menti; Referee: Giunti (Arezzo)

13 December 1970 9	AS Roma	0–0	Cagliari	Rome
				Stadium: Olimpico; Referee: Lo Bello

20 December 1970 10	Cagliari	2–1	Bologna	Cagliari
	Domenghini 40', 56'		60' Savoldi	Stadium: Sant'Elia; Referee: Gonella

27 December 1970 11	Catania	1–1	Cagliari	Catania
	Baisi 3'		68' Gori	Stadium: Cibali; Referee: Pieroni

3 January 1971 12	Cagliari	0–0	Torino	Cagliari
				Stadium: Sant'Elia; Referee: Bernardis

10 January 1971 13	SSC Napoli	1–0	Cagliari	Naples
	Altafini 54'			Stadium: Stadio San Paolo Arbitro: Referee: Sbardella (Rome)

17 January 1971 14	Cagliari	0–4	Milan	Cagliari
			22' Maldera; 39' Benetti; 44' Prati; 71' Combin	Stadium: Sant'Elia; Referee: Gonella

24 January 1971 15	Hellas Verona	2–0	Cagliari	Verona
	Clerici 27', 87'			Stadium: Marcantonio Bentegodi Arbitro: Referee: Carminati (Milan)

31 January 1971 16	Sampdoria	0–0	Cagliari	Genova
				Stadium: Luigi Ferraris; Referee: Francescon

7 February 1971 17	Cagliari	2–1	Lazio	Cagliari
	Domenghini 62'; Brugnera 82'		90' Chinaglia	Stadium: Stadio Sant'Elia Arbitro: Referee: Monti (Ancona)

14 February 1971 18	Varese	4–1	Cagliari	Varese
	Traspedini 2', 40'; Braida 78', 87'		80' Domenghini	Stadium: Stadio Franco Ossola Arbitro: Referee: Lattanzi (Rome)

28 February 1971 19	Cagliari	0–0	Inter	Cagliari
				Stadium: Stadio Sant'Elia; Referee: Sbardella

7 March 1971 20	Foggia	0–0	Cagliari	Foggia
				Stadium: Stadio Pino Zaccheria; Referee: Panzino (Catanzaro)

14 March 1971 21	Cagliari	1–1	Juventus	Cagliari
	Greatti 9'		48' Capello	Stadium: Stadio Sant'Elia Arbitro: Referee: Picasso (Chiavari)

21 March 1971 22	Fiorentina	1–2	Cagliari	Florence
	D'Alessi 22'		32' Greatti; 89' (o.g.) Chiarugi	Stadium: Comunale Arbitro: Referee: Bernardis (Rome)

28 March 1971 23	Cagliari	1–1	Lanerossi Vicenza	Cagliari
	Mancin 53'		85' Chinesinho	Stadium: Stadio Sant'Elia Arbitro: Referee: Monti (Ancona)

4 April 1971 24	Cagliari	0–1	AS Roma	Cagliari
			50' Cappellini	Stadium: Stadio Sant'Elia; Referee: Lazzaroni

11 April 1971 25	Bologna	0–0	Cagliari	Bologna
				Stadium: Comunale; Referee: Cantelli (Florence)

18 April 1971 26	Cagliari	1–1	Catania	Cagliari
	Nastasio 46'		2' Schifilliti	Stadium: Stadio Sant'Elia; Referee: Gialluisi (Barletta)

25 April 1971 27	Torino	2–1	Cagliari	Turin
	Bui 17'; Maddè 46' (pen.)		34' Riva	Stadium: Comunale; Referee: Branzoni (Pavia)

2 May 1971 28	Cagliari	1–1	SSC Napoli	Cagliari
	Riva 63'		6' Ghio	Stadium: Stadio Sant'Elia; Referee: Giunti (Arezzo)

16 May 1971 29	Milan	3–1	Cagliari	Milan
	Prati 59' (pen.), 73' (pen.); Scarrone 61'		30' Riva	Stadium: San Siro; Referee: Menegali (Rome)

23 May 1971 30	Cagliari	4–1	Hellas Verona	Cagliari
	Mancin 32', 40', 65'; Riva 55'		70' Ferrari	Stadium: Stadio Sant'Elia; Referee: Calì

=== Coppa Italia ===
==== First round ====
===== Group 1 =====
Pos	Team	Pld	W	D	L	GF	GA	GD	Pts
1	Livorno	3	2	1	0	3	0	+3	5
2	Cagliari	3	2	0	1	8	5	+3	4
3	Massese	3	1	1	1	2	4	−2	3
4	Pisa	3	0	0	3	2	6	−4	0

===== Matches =====
30 August 1970 1	Livorno	2–0	Cagliari	Livorno
	Unere 80'; Martini 89'			Stadium: Comunale; Referee: Gussoni

6 September 1970 2	Pisa	2–4	Cagliari	Pisa
	Cosma 21'; Piaceri 62'		13' (pen.) Domenghini; 29', 63', 83' Riva	Stadium: Arena Garibaldi; Referee: Carminati

12 September 1970 3	Cagliari	4–1	Massese	Cagliari
	Riva 15', 83'; Gori 44' (pen.); Zana 52' (o.g.)		58' Albanese	Stadium: Stadio Sant'Elia; Referee: Stagnoli (Bologna)

=== European Cup ===
==== First round ====
19 September 1970 1	Cagliari (Italy)	3–0	(France) AS Saint-Étienne	Cagliari
	Riva 7', 70'; Nené 20'			Stadium: Sant'Elia; Referee: (Romania) Limona

30 September 1970 2	AS Saint-Étienne (France)	1–0	(Italy) Cagliari	Saint-Étienne
	Larqué 32'			Stadium: Stade Geoffroy Guichard; Referee: (Romania) Limona

==== Eightfinals ====
21 October 1970 1	Cagliari (Italy)	2–1	(Spain) Atlético Madrid	Cagliari
	Riva 42'; Gori 45+1'		78' Aragonés	Stadium: Sant'Elia; Referee: (Czech Republic) Krňávek

5 November 1970 2	Atlético Madrid (Spain)	3–0	(Italy) Cagliari	Madrid
	Aragonés 33', 71' (pen.), 90+2'			Stadium: Vicente Calderon; Referee: (Wales) Jones

== Statistics ==
=== Players statistics ===
No.	Pos	Nat	Player	Total		Serie A		Coppa		European Cup	
No.	Pos	Nat	Player	Apps	Goals	Apps	Goals	Apps	Goals	Apps	Goals
	GK	(Italy) ITA	Enrico Albertosi	36	-44	29	-34	3	-5	4	-5
	DF	(Italy) ITA	Eraldo Mancin	35	4	28	4	3	0	4	0
	DF	(Italy) ITA	Mario Martiradonna	34	1	27	1	3	0	4	0
	DF	(Italy) ITA	Comunardo Niccolai	35	1	28	1	3	0	4	0
	DF	(Italy) ITA	Giuseppe Tomasini	28	0	22	0	2	0	4	0
	DF	(Italy) ITA	Pierluigi Cera	24	0	17	0	3	0	4	0
	MF	(Italy) ITA	Angelo Domenghini	36	9	29	8	3	1	4	0
	MF	(Italy) ITA	Ricciotti Greatti	34	2	26+1	2	3	0	4	0
	MF	(Italy) ITA	Cesare Poli	26	0	18+6	0	1	0	1	0
	MF	(Brazil) BRA	Nené	37	2	30	1	3	0	4	1
	FW	(Italy) ITA	Sergio Gori	37	5	30	3	3	1	4	1
	GK	(Italy) ITA	Moriano Tampucci	2	0	1+1	0				
	MF	(Italy) ITA	Mario Brugnera	25	2	14+5	2	3	0	3	0
	FW	(Italy) ITA	Gigi Riva	19	16	13	8	3	5	3	3
	DF	(Italy) ITA	Roberto De Petri	12	0	10+2	0				
	FW	(Italy) ITA	Giampaolo Menichelli	13	0	8+5	0				
	FW	(Italy) ITA	Corrado Nastasio	7	1	0+5	1	1	0	1	0
	GK	(Italy) ITA	Adriano Reginato	2	-1	0+2	-1	0	0	0	0

- Source: http://calcio-seriea.net/presenze/1970/676/
