= Gigi Riva =

Italian footballer (1944–2024)

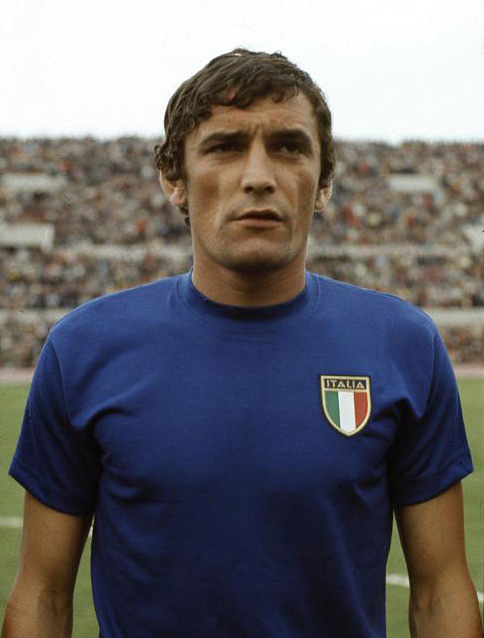
- Riva with Italy in 1968

Personal information
- Full name: Luigi Riva
- Date of birth: 7 November 1944
- Place of birth: Leggiuno, Lombardy, Italian Social Republic
- Date of death: 22 January 2024 (aged 79)
- Place of death: Cagliari, Sardinia, Italy
- Height: 1.80 m (5 ft 11 in)
- Position: Striker

Youth career
- 1961–1962: Laveno Mombello
- 1962: Legnano

Senior career*
Years	Team	Apps	(Gls)
1962–1963	Legnano	23	(6)
1963–1976	Cagliari	315	(164)
Total		338	(170)

International career
1965–1974	Italy	42	(35)

Managerial career
- 1988–2013: Italy (Team manager)
Medal record
Men's football
Representing Italy
UEFA European Championship
Winner	1968 Italy
FIFA World Cup
Runner-up	1970 Mexico
- * Club domestic league appearances and goals

Luigi "Gigi" Riva (Italian: [luˈiːdʒi ˈdʒiːdʒi ˈriːva]; 7 November 1944 – 22 January 2024) was an Italian professional footballer who played as a striker.

Considered to be one of the best players of his generation, as well as one of the greatest strikers of all time, Riva enjoyed a remarkable scoring record for Cagliari, thanks to his composure in front of goal, powerful left foot and aerial ability; his speed, strength and eye for goal led the Italian journalist Gianni Brera to nickname him "Rombo di Tuono" (Roar of Thunder). Aside from his debut season with Legnano, Riva remained with the Sardinian club for his entire career: he helped Cagliari achieve promotion to the Italian top-flight for the first time in 1964, and later led the club to their only Serie A title in 1969–70.

At international level, Riva won the 1968 UEFA European Championship and was runner-up at the 1970 FIFA World Cup with the Italy national team; he also took part at the 1974 FIFA World Cup. With 35 goals in 42 appearances between 1965 and 1974, he is Italy's all-time leading goalscorer.

After retiring in 1976, Riva briefly served as the president of Cagliari during the 1986–87 season, and was later the team manager and director of the Italy national team from 1988 until 2013.

== Early life ==
Riva was born into a poor family in Leggiuno, a small town in the northern Italian province of Varese, Lombardy, near the Swiss border, on 7 November 1944. His mother, Edis, was a housewife, while his father, Ugo, worked several jobs, firstly as a hairdresser, then as a tailor, and subsequently in a factory, where he died in a work-related accident on 10 February 1953, when Luigi was nine. Edis began working as a maid, while Luigi was sent to a strict religious boarding school, where he remained for three years, before finding a job in a lift-factory and beginning to play football; his mother died soon afterwards.

== Club career ==
=== 1962–1964: early years, debut with Legnano, and promotion with Cagliari ===
Riva started playing amateur football for the Laveno Mombello youth side in Lombardy, scoring 30 goals in 1961 and 33 the following season. He began his professional career in 1962, at the age of 18, when he joined Serie C side Legnano-Ivrea, scoring 6 goals in 22 appearances in his debut season. The youngster's promising performances attracted the attention of Cagliari president Enrico Rocca, and he was acquired by the Serie B side the following year for a notable sum of 37 million Lire, at the age of 19; Riva remained with the Sardinian team for the rest of his career. In his first season with the club, he scored 8 goals in 26 appearances and helped Cagliari to a second-place finish in the league behind Varese, which enabled the team to achieve promotion to the top-flight for the first time in their 40-year history.

=== 1964–1970: Serie A debut with Cagliari and road to the Serie A title ===
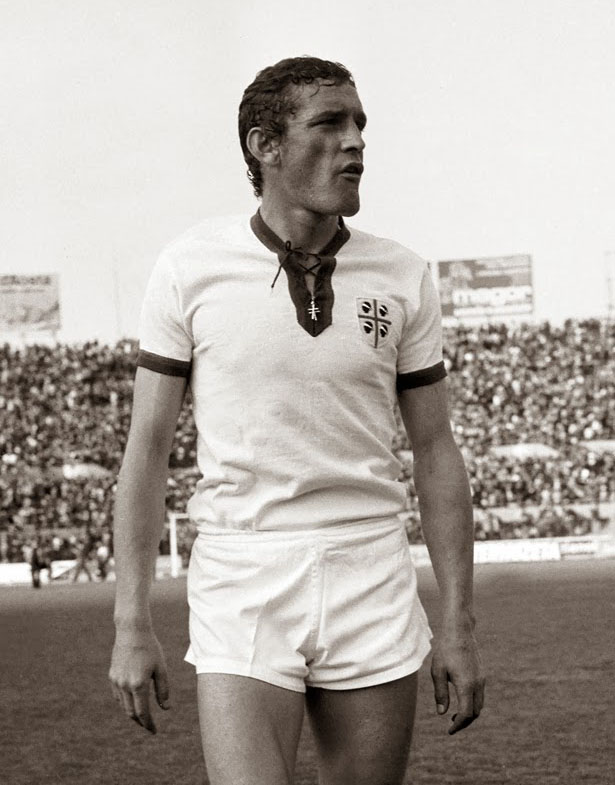
Riva with Cagliari in 1970

The following season, Riva made his Serie A debut for Cagliari on 13 September 1964, in a 2–1 loss against Roma, and also helped the club avoid relegation, leading the team to a comfortable sixth-place finish in the table, scoring an encouraging 9 goals in 32 appearances at the age of 20. Between 1965 and 1968, Cagliari secured mid-table finishes, placing eleventh, sixth, and ninth. Despite the team's mixed form, Riva's individual profile grew as he claimed his first capocannoniere title as league top scorer during the 1966–67 season, netting 18 goals, as the club began to build a potential title winning side around their star striker: Riva attracted several notable footballers to Cagliari, and the team during this period featured players such as Enrico Albertosi, Roberto Boninsegna, Ricciotti Greatti, Comunardo Niccolai, Mario Martiradonna, Mario Brugnera, Pierluigi Cera, and Nené. Riva subsequently helped Cagliari to a second-place finish in both the Coppa Italia, behind Roma, and the league, four points behind Fiorentina, during the 1968–69 season, winning the capocannoniere title for a second time with 20 goals in 29 appearances. Cagliari had been leading in the league until the 21st matchday, when a loss at home to Juventus caused the team to surrender their lead.

In the summer of 1969, Calgliari traded Roberto Boninsegna to Inter Milan in exchange for forwards Angelo Domenghini and Sergio Gori. Backed by these new signings and the offensive tactics of manager Manilo Scopigno, Riva spearheaded Cagliari to their first and only Serie A title during the 1969-70 season, scoring several decisive goals throughout the campaign. On 15 March 1970, with Cagliari having climbed to the top of the table with six league games remaining, Riva scored two goals to help Cagliari come back twice from behind in a 2–2 away draw against second placed Juventus. His second, equalising goal came from a penalty, with eight minutes remaining, and the result allowed Cagliari to maintain their lead over the Turin side in Serie A. Cagliari headed into April still in first place by three points, with three matches remaining; to clinch the Scudetto, Cagliari needed to win their next match at home against Bari, while Juventus, who were still in second place, needed to lose away against Lazio. On 12 April, Riva opened the scoring with a diving header in an eventual 2–0 win over Bari at the Stadio Amsicora, while Juventus suffered a 2–0 defeat to Lazio in Rome, with goals from Gian Piero Ghio and Giorgio Chinaglia. As a result, Cagliari were crowned Serie A champions for the first time in their history, with two games to spare, also sealing a place in the European Cup the following season. This was the first time a club south of Rome had won the league title. Riva once again finished the season as top scorer, with 21 goals. During this period, Riva's skill, prolific goalscoring, and decisive performances in leading a small, provincial club like Cagliari from Serie B to the Serie A title, saw him become one of the best strikers in the world: he was the Serie A top scorer on three occasions, in 1966–67, 1968–69 and 1969–70, and he placed 2nd in the 1969 Ballon d'Or, behind compatriot Gianni Rivera, and 3rd in the 1970 Ballon d'Or, behind Gerd Müller and Bobby Moore.

=== 1970–1976: final years with Cagliari ===
"... I baptise him Rombo di tuono [thunder-clap] ... one of the most extraordinary athletes ever produced by Italian football."

— Journalist Gianni Brera gives Riva his famous nickname.

Riva's season immediately following Cagliari's league triumph took off to a promising start: in the opening weeks of the season, he helped Cagliari to the top of the league table with a series of impressive results, including a 3–1 away win over Inter at the San Siro stadium on 29 October 1970, scoring twice, and earning his famous nickname "Rombo di Tuono" (Roar of Thunder) from journalist Gianni Brera as a result of his dominant performance. He also made his debut in the European Cup that season, helping Cagliari to the second round with two goals in a 3–0 home win against Saint-Étienne in the first leg of the first round of the competition. He later added a third goal in the tournament in the club's 2–1 home victory over Atlético Madrid in the first leg of the second round. However, Riva's season was ended prematurely by a serious injury which he endured in a European qualifying match with the Italy national team in late October. In his absence, Cagliari were soon eliminated from the European Cup in the round of 16, and dropped down the domestic table, eventually finishing in seventh place. After recovering from his injury, Riva managed 21 goals in 30 games during the 1971–72 season, finishing the season as the second highest goalscorer in the league, and helping Cagliari to a fourth-place finish and a spot in the next season's UEFA Cup. With the departure of Scopigno, Cagliari's results declined during the next two seasons, with the club only managing low mid-table finishes, although Riva's goalscoring output still remained consistent, as he scored 12 goals during 1972–73 season, and 15 during the 1973–74 season. Despite having already established himself as a world class player, Cagliari struggled in the league during the mid 70s, Riva remained loyal to the Sardinian side, and turned down many bids from larger clubs, in particular from northern Italy. During his time with Cagliari, he demonstrated his attachment to the club when he refused several lucrative offers from Serie A giants Juventus to remain in the Sardinian capital, despite numerous rumours in the press which stated that he had already signed with the Turin side in exchange for large, record-breaking sums and several of their own players.

Despite his talent and goalscoring prowess, Riva's career was blighted by several major injuries, in particular with the Italian national side, and which greatly limited his playing time in later seasons. He missed 35 games in the five seasons leading up to 1971, and only appeared in 24 matches for Cagliari between 1974 and 1976, which saw an overall decline to his goalscoring rate and the club's performances during this period. During the 1974–75 season, a calf injury limited him to 8 appearances and 2 goals, and on 1 February 1976, while playing in a match for Cagliari against Milan, Riva ruptured a tendon and tore an adductor muscle in his right thigh, following a physical shoulder challenge near the corner flag from Aldo Bet, after being chased down by the Milan defender. He never successfully recovered and, despite several comeback attempts over the next year and a half, was eventually forced to retire in 1978, at the age of 33, having played his last game at the age of 31 in 1976. The injury limited Riva to only 15 appearances during the 1975–76 Serie A season. Despite his run of six goals in a span of eight games during the final season of his career, Cagliari finished in last place in the league in his absence, and were relegated to Serie B. Riva scored 248 goals for club and country throughout his career in 439 appearances, scoring 164 league goals with Cagliari in 315 appearances, 156 of which came in 289 Serie A appearances. Overall, he scored 207 goals in 374 appearances in all competitions during his thirteen seasons with Cagliari, and 213 career club goals in 397 appearances.

== International career ==
=== Early years and Euro 1968 champion ===
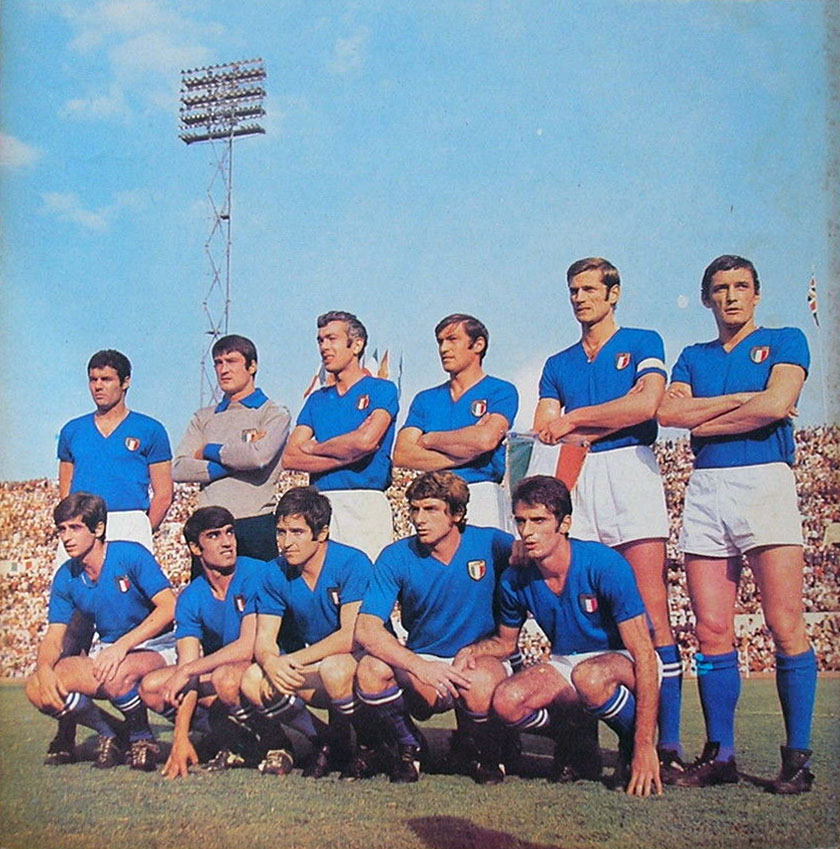
Riva (standing, first from right) with Italy in 1969

Following some impressive performances for the Italian youth side, Riva made his senior international debut with Italy at the age of 20, on 27 June 1965, in a 2–1 friendly defeat against Hungary, coming on for the injured Ezio Pascutti in the eighth minute. He was the first Cagliari player to be capped at senior international level. His international career was off to a difficult start, with his performance in his second appearance for Italy, a 0–0 friendly draw against France in Paris on 19 March 1966, criticised by noted journalist Gianni Brera, who initially described Riva as a "one-footed" and "incomplete player". He was subsequently controversially excluded from the 22-man 1966 FIFA World Cup squad, although he was still brought to England by manager Edmondo Fabbri, along with Mario Bertini, as an additional reserve, to gain experience with the national side; Italy were eliminated in the first round of the tournament. After breaking both his left tibia and fibula in his third international appearance, a 1–1 friendly home draw against Portugal on 27 March 1967, Riva returned to the national team as a starter seven months later, and finally scored his first goal for Italy in his fourth international appearance, a 5–0 home win over Cyprus on 1 November 1967, in a UEFA Euro 1968 qualifying match, later completing a hat-trick in the same game. Riva was a member of the Italian side that won the 1968 European Championships on home soil under manager Ferruccio Valcareggi. After recovering from a leg injury, he returned to the starting line-up and scored the opening goal in the twelfth minute of the final replay in Rome on 10 June, which ended in a 2–0 victory over Yugoslavia; Riva was named to the Team of the Tournament for his performance during the match.

=== 1970 World Cup runner-up ===
"The best goal of the best game of the best sport in the world."

— Journalist Mario Grismondi comments on Riva's extra-time goal against West Germany in Italy's 4–3 victory in the 1970 World Cup semi-final.

On 22 November 1969, Riva scored a famous diving header in a 3–0 away win in a World Cup qualifying match against East Germany, at the Stadio San Paolo in Naples, which sealed Italy's place at the 1970 World Cup. Prior to the tournament, he had scored 19 goals in only 16 matches. At the 1970 World Cup in Mexico, much was expected of Riva; however, he initially underperformed in the first round, failing to score in either of Italy's three group matches, although both Riva and his strike-partner Angelo Domenghini saw their goals wrongly disallowed for offside in Italy's final group match, a 0–0 draw against Israel on 11 June. Following his disappointing and goalless performances in the group stage, and much media criticism and scrutiny, Riva finally opened his account in the World Cup in the second round. On 14 June, he helped Italy defeat the hosts Mexico 4–1 in the quarter-finals, scoring two goals, both from Gianni Rivera assists, forming a notable offensive partnership with the Milan playmaker in the knock-out rounds of the competition. Riva subsequently netted a crucial extra-time goal – his 22nd in 21 international appearances – against West Germany in Italy's 4–3 semi-final victory on 17 June, which is colloquially known as the "Game of the Century". The Italian team finished runners up in the tournament after losing 4–1 to Brazil in the final. Riva finished the competition as Italy's top-scorer, with three goals. After the tournament, Riva broke his right leg while on international duty in a European qualifying match later that year. He was forced off in the 76th minute of a 2–1 away win against Austria on 31 October, at the Praterstadion, in Vienna, following a hard challenge from Austrian defender Norbert Hof.

=== Later years, Italy's all-time goalscorer and 1974 World Cup ===
On 31 March 1973, Riva scored four goals in a 5–0 home win over Luxembourg, in a World Cup qualifying match, becoming one of only six players to accomplish this feat with the Italy national side. On 9 June, he became Italy's all-time leading goalscorer, equalling the record of 33 goals held by Giuseppe Meazza, scoring in a 2–0 friendly against Brazil in Rome; Meazza reportedly stated after the match "That Riva is good, he scored a lot of goals against Cyprus and Turkey. Surely my goals were much more important."

Riva later surpassed Meazza's record with his 34th international goal in a 2–0 home win in a friendly against Sweden on 29 September 1973, and scored his final and 35th goal for Italy later that year, on 20 October, in a 2–0 home win over Switzerland in a World Cup qualifying match. Despite his initial dominance for Italy, Riva's struggles with injuries subsequently saw him display a series of disappointing performances at the 1974 World Cup in West Germany, along with many other members of the Italian squad, which led him to be dropped for the last group game against Poland, which saw Italy eliminated in the first round of the tournament following a 2–1 defeat; he made his 42nd and final appearance for Italy at the age of 29, in Italy's second group match of the tournament, a 1–1 draw against Argentina, on 19 June. Riva is currently still Italy's top-goalscorer of all time, with 35 goals in just 42 matches, with an average of 0.83 goals per game. In addition to being Italy's all-time leading goalscorer, Riva is also the highest goalscorer in combined goals scored at the FIFA World Cup and FIFA World Cup qualifier matches with 17 goals, and Italy's highest goalscorer in FIFA World Cup qualifiers, with 14 goals. Furthermore, alongside Silvio Piola, he co-holds the national team's record for most goals on opposition soil with 13.

== After retirement and death ==
"Riva is eternal for Sardinia, he is a mythical ... almost a religious figure."

— Vito Biolchini.

After retiring, Riva remained in Cagliari, and founded the first school of football in Sardinia in 1976, which bears his name. He later became an executive with his former club; he also briefly served as Cagliari's president during the 1986–87 season, but stepped down from this position in December 1986, after only a few months, and was replaced by Lucio Cordeddu. He later served as a director and subsequently as a team managing staff member for the Italy national football team from 1988 until 2013, and was also a member of the technical staff for the Italy national team that won the 2006 FIFA World Cup under his supervision; he drew praise from captain Fabio Cannavaro for his role in Italy's fourth World Cup title victory.

On 5 January 2005, Cagliari retired Riva's number 11 jersey to honour him and his achievements with the club; Rocco Sabato, the last holder of the number 11 shirt, presented Riva with his jersey in the official ceremony held at the Stadio Sant'Elia of Cagliari, ahead of Italy's friendly match against Russia. Riva's jersey was the first to be retired by the Sardinian club.

On 21 January 2024, Riva was hospitalized at the San Michele Hospital in Cagliari due to acute coronary syndrome; according to the medical staff assisting him, he was initially in a stable condition and was offered to undergo percutaneous coronary intervention, a decision he opted to delay. In the evening of the following day, however, Riva's health condition suddenly deteriorated, and he eventually died of a heart attack, at the age of 79.

== Style of play ==
"Riva plays poetic football. He is a realistic poet."

— Pier Paolo Pasolini.

"[Riva]'s right foot is only needed to step up onto the tram."

— Riva's coach at Cagliari, Manlio Scopigno, known as The Philosopher, jokes about Riva's predominantly left footed playing style.

Regarded as one of Italy's greatest players, and one of the best strikers of his generation, Riva was a prolific forward known for his clinical finishing and physical presence. He was initially deployed as a winger on the left flank early in his career, although he would often cut into the centre of the pitch in order to strike on goal; as a result, he was later played in a more offensive and central role, as a main striker. A naturally left footed player, he had a very powerful and accurate shot from both inside and outside the area, which led Gianni Brera to nickname him "Rombo di Tuono" (Roar of Thunder); although he was predominantly left-footed, he was also capable of scoring with his right foot on occasion.

"One of the best, if not the best striker I have ever met."

— Riva's former Italy team-mate Sandro Mazzola praises the Cagliari striker.

Due to his height, physique, elevation, and his heading accuracy, Riva excelled in the air, and he also had a penchant for scoring acrobatic goals from bicycle kicks, courtesy of his athleticism and volleying ability. He also possessed technical ability, creativity, and dribbling skills, as well as a notable elegance on the ball. In addition to his goalscoring prowess and technique, he was also a hard-working and fast player, who excelled during sprints and at making attacking runs. He was also an accurate free-kick and penalty kick taker. Despite his ability, his career was often marked by injuries, which later affected his mobility, continuity, and fitness, and eventually forced him to retire prematurely.

== Personal life ==
Riva had a partner, Gianna Tofanari and two sons. He was Catholic.

== Career statistics ==
=== Club ===
Appearances and goals by club, season and competition
Club	Season	League			Coppa Italia		League Cup		Europe		Total	
Club	Season	Division	Apps	Goals	Apps	Goals	Apps	Goals	Apps	Goals	Apps	Goals
Legnano	1962–63	Serie C	23	6	0	0	0	0	0	0	23	6
Cagliari	1963–64	Serie B	26	8	2	0	0	0	0	0	28	8
Cagliari	1964–65	Serie A	32	9	4	3	0	0	0	0	36	12
Cagliari	1965–66	Serie A	34	11	3	0	0	0	0	0	37	11
Cagliari	1966–67	Serie A	23	18	3	0	1	1	0	0	27	19
Cagliari	1967–68	Serie A	26	13	1	0	4	3	0	0	31	16
Cagliari	1968–69	Serie A	29	20	6	8	2	0	0	0	37	28
Cagliari	1969–70	Serie A	28	21	6	5	0	0	2	1	36	27
Cagliari	1970–71	Serie A	13	8	5	5	4	2	3	3	25	18
Cagliari	1971–72	Serie A	30	21	4	3	0	0	0	0	34	24
Cagliari	1972–73	Serie A	26	12	6	8	0	0	1	0	33	20
Cagliari	1973–74	Serie A	25	15	1	0	0	0	0	0	26	15
Cagliari	1974–75	Serie A	8	2	1	1	0	0	0	0	9	3
Cagliari	1975–76	Serie A	15	6	0	0	0	0	0	0	15	6
Cagliari	Total		315	164	42	33	11	6	6	4	374	207
Career total			338	170	42	33	11	6	6	4	397	213

=== International ===
Appearances and goals by national team and year
National team	Year	Apps	Goals
Italy	1965	1	0
Italy	1966	1	0
Italy	1967	4	6
Italy	1968	2	2
Italy	1969	6	8
Italy	1970	10	6
Italy	1971	3	2
Italy	1972	6	4
Italy	1973	7	7
Italy	1974	2	0
Total		42	35

== Honours ==
Cagliari

- Serie A: 1969–70

Italy

- UEFA European Championship: 1968
- FIFA World Cup runner-up: 1970

Individual

- Serie A top scorer: 1966–67, 1968–69, 1969–70
- Ballon d'Or: runner-up: 1969; third place: 1970
- UEFA European Championship Team of the Tournament: 1968
- FUWO European Team of the Season: 1969, 1970
- World XI: 1971
- Sport Ideal European XI: 1973
- World Soccer's 100 Greatest Footballers of All Time: 1999
- UEFA Jubilee Poll (2004): #100
- Golden Foot "Football Legends": 2005
- Inducted into the Italian Football Hall of Fame: 2011
- Inducted into the Walk of Fame of Italian sport: 2015
- Inducted into the Cagliari Hall of Fame
- Cagliari Greatest All-time Starting XI
- Cagliari's number 11 jersey retired in February 2005

Orders

- 3rd Class / Commander: Commendatore Ordine al Merito della Repubblica Italiana: 1991

- 2nd Class / Grand Officer: Grande Ufficiale Ordine al Merito della Repubblica Italiana: 2000

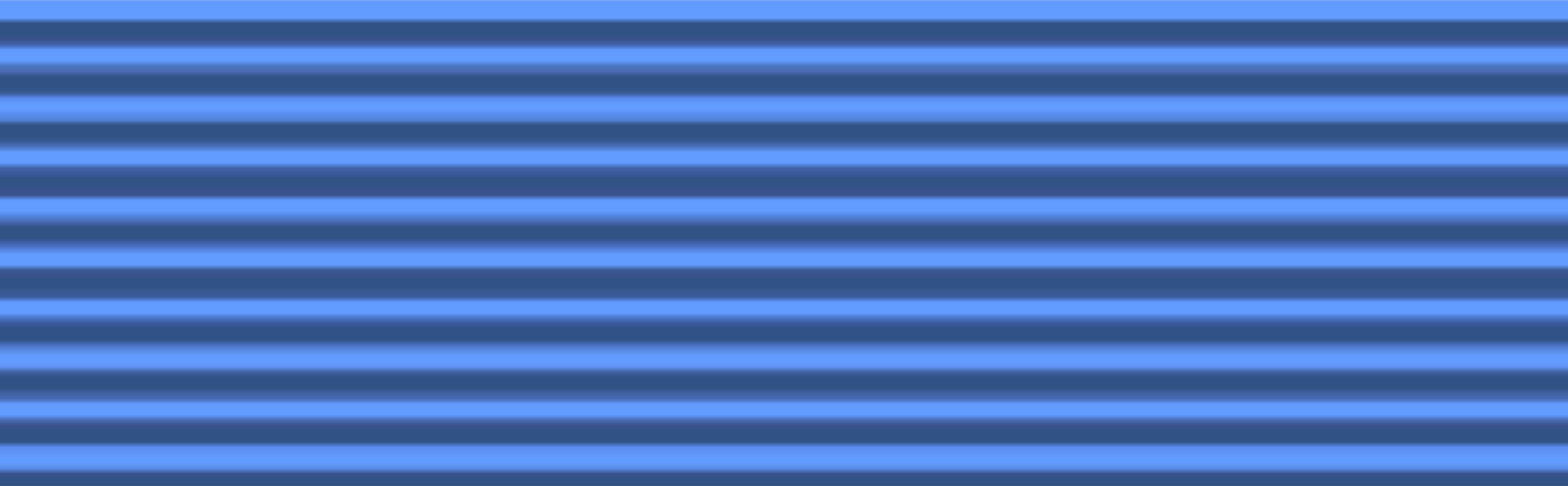
- CONI: Golden Star of Sports Merit: 2006

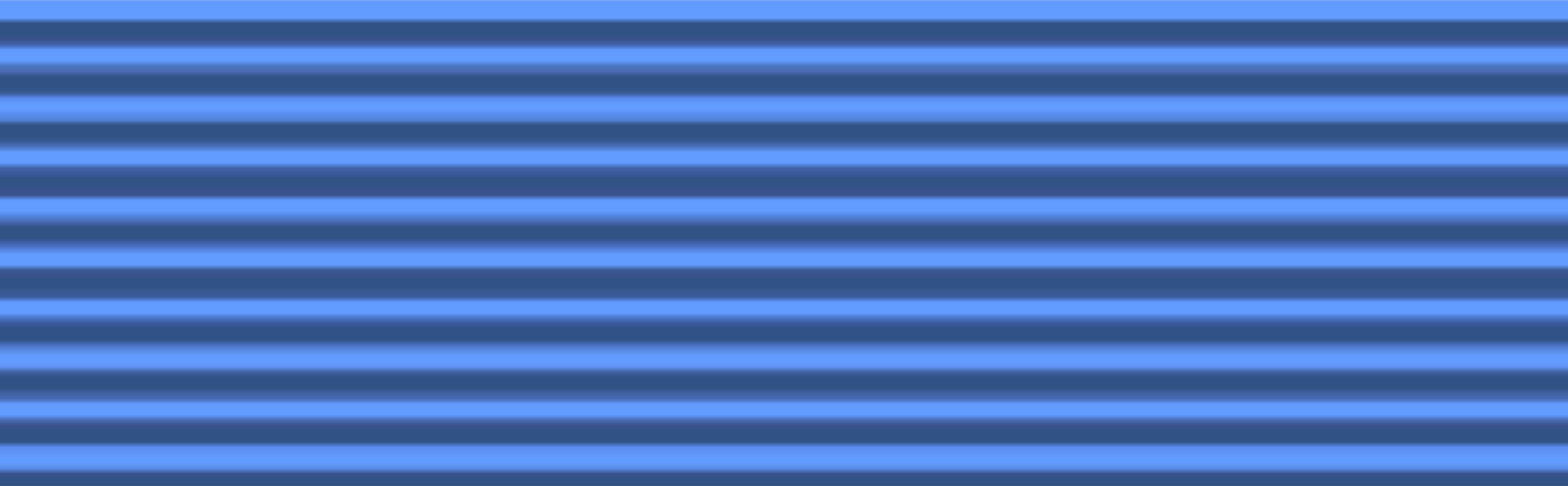
- CONI: Golden Collar of Sports Merit: 2016

== See also ==
- List of top international men's football goalscorers by country
