= Ricciotti Greatti =

Italian footballer

Personal information
- Date of birth: October 13, 1939 (age 86)
- Place of birth: Italy
- Position: Midfielder

Senior career*
Years	Team	Apps	(Gls)
- Fiorentina
- Palermo
- Reggiana
1963–	Cagliari		
- * Club domestic league appearances and goals

Ricciotti Greatti (born 13 October 1939) is an Italian former footballer who played as a midfielder.

== Career ==
A central midfielder, Greatti began his career at Fiorentina before moving on to Palermo and Reggiana.

Greatti joined Cagliari in 1963. His arrival coincided with the rise of the Sardinian side to Serie A, playing alongside important players in the club's history, such as Luigi Riva, Pierluigi Cera and Mario Martiradonna. He was a key player in Cagliari's first and currently only scudetto triumph in 1970.
