= Reginato =

Reginato is an Italian surname. Notable people with the surname include:

- Adriano Reginato (born 1937), Italian footballer
- Peter Reginato (born 1945), American sculptor and painter
- Vic Reginato (1918–2000), American football player
- Virginia Reginato (born 1939), Chilean politician
