= 1962–63 Serie C =

Serie C
- Season: 1962-63
- Champions: Girone A - Varese, Girone B - Prato, Potenza
- Promoted: Girone A - Varese, Girone B - Prato, Potenza
- Relegated: Girone A - Casale, Danremese, Girone B - Civitanovese, Rosignano Solvay, Girone C - Crotone, Avellino

The 1962–63 Serie C was the twenty-fifth edition of Serie C, the third highest league in the Italian football league system.

== Girone A ==
| Pos | Team | Pld | W | D | L | GF | GA | GD | Pts | Promotion or relegation |
|---|---|---|---|---|---|---|---|---|---|---|
| 1 | Varese | 34 | 20 | 10 | 4 | 61 | 21 | +40 | 50 | Promoted to Serie B |
| 2 | Novara | 34 | 19 | 9 | 6 | 49 | 26 | +23 | 47 | |
| 3 | Savona | 34 | 16 | 13 | 5 | 43 | 21 | +22 | 45 | |
| 4 | Mestrina | 34 | 13 | 13 | 8 | 35 | 25 | +10 | 39 | |
| 5 | Biellese | 34 | 14 | 11 | 9 | 40 | 31 | +9 | 39 | |
| 6 | Ivrea | 34 | 14 | 9 | 11 | 40 | 33 | +7 | 37 | |
| 7 | Rizzoli Milano | 34 | 9 | 16 | 9 | 31 | 27 | +4 | 34 | |
| 8 | Legnano | 34 | 13 | 8 | 13 | 32 | 33 | −1 | 34 | |
| 9 | Fanfulla | 34 | 14 | 6 | 14 | 37 | 40 | −3 | 34 | |
| 10 | Marzotto | 34 | 12 | 7 | 15 | 32 | 33 | −1 | 31 | |
| 11 | Treviso | 34 | 10 | 11 | 13 | 26 | 27 | −1 | 31 | |
| 12 | Cremonese | 34 | 12 | 7 | 15 | 31 | 39 | −8 | 31 | |
| 13 | Vittorio Veneto | 34 | 8 | 14 | 12 | 25 | 35 | −10 | 30 | |
| 14 | Pordenone | 34 | 11 | 7 | 16 | 32 | 42 | −10 | 29 | |
| 15 | Monfalcone C.R.D.A. | 34 | 10 | 7 | 17 | 25 | 45 | −20 | 27 | |
| 16 | Saronno | 34 | 10 | 6 | 18 | 22 | 43 | −21 | 26 | |
| 17 | Casale | 34 | 8 | 9 | 17 | 35 | 53 | −18 | 25 | Relegated to Serie D |
| 18 | Sanremese | 34 | 7 | 9 | 18 | 28 | 50 | −22 | 23 | Relegated to Serie D |

== Girone B ==
| Pos | Team | Pld | W | D | L | GF | GA | GD | Pts | Promotion or relegation |
|---|---|---|---|---|---|---|---|---|---|---|
| 1 | Prato | 34 | 17 | 12 | 5 | 46 | 27 | +19 | 46 | Promoted to Serie B |
| 2 | Rimini | 34 | 17 | 7 | 10 | 46 | 29 | +17 | 41 | |
| 3 | Arezzo | 34 | 15 | 11 | 8 | 38 | 26 | +12 | 41 | |
| 4 | Livorno | 34 | 15 | 11 | 8 | 34 | 23 | +11 | 41 | |
| 5 | Reggiana | 34 | 12 | 13 | 9 | 33 | 28 | +5 | 37 | |
| 6 | Torres | 34 | 13 | 10 | 11 | 44 | 32 | +12 | 36 | |
| 7 | Anconitana | 34 | 13 | 9 | 12 | 34 | 30 | +4 | 35 | |
| 8 | Rapallo Ruentes | 34 | 12 | 11 | 11 | 29 | 26 | +3 | 35 | |
| 9 | Perugia | 34 | 10 | 15 | 9 | 30 | 37 | −7 | 35 | |
| 10 | Siena | 34 | 10 | 11 | 13 | 37 | 41 | −4 | 31 | |
| 11 | Cesena | 34 | 13 | 5 | 16 | 34 | 41 | −7 | 31 | |
| 12 | Pistoiese | 34 | 9 | 12 | 13 | 23 | 31 | −8 | 30 | |
| 13 | Pisa | 34 | 8 | 14 | 12 | 21 | 33 | −12 | 30 | |
| 14 | Forlì | 34 | 10 | 9 | 15 | 36 | 42 | −6 | 29 | |
| 15 | Grosseto | 34 | 7 | 15 | 12 | 27 | 34 | −7 | 29 | |
| 16 | Ravenna | 34 | 8 | 13 | 13 | 32 | 40 | −8 | 29 | |
| 17 | Civitanovese | 34 | 8 | 12 | 14 | 28 | 35 | −7 | 28 | Relegated to Serie D |
| 18 | Rosignano Solvay | 34 | 8 | 12 | 14 | 23 | 40 | −17 | 28 | Relegated to Serie D |

== Girone C ==
| Pos | Team | Pld | W | D | L | GF | GA | GD | Pts | Promotion or relegation |
|---|---|---|---|---|---|---|---|---|---|---|
| 1 | Potenza | 34 | 18 | 11 | 5 | 47 | 18 | +29 | 47 | Promoted to Serie B |
| 2 | Trapani | 34 | 12 | 17 | 5 | 44 | 24 | +20 | 41 | |
| 3 | Akragas | 34 | 15 | 10 | 9 | 38 | 31 | +7 | 40 | |
| 4 | Salernitana | 34 | 12 | 14 | 8 | 23 | 18 | +5 | 38 | |
| 5 | Pescara | 34 | 13 | 12 | 9 | 37 | 38 | −1 | 38 | |
| 6 | Trani | 34 | 11 | 14 | 9 | 41 | 32 | +9 | 36 | |
| 7 | Marsala | 34 | 13 | 10 | 11 | 31 | 27 | +4 | 36 | |
| 8 | Lecce | 34 | 10 | 16 | 8 | 30 | 30 | 0 | 36 | |
| 9 | Reggina | 34 | 10 | 13 | 11 | 27 | 29 | −2 | 33 | |
| 10 | Siracusa | 34 | 8 | 15 | 11 | 36 | 30 | +6 | 31 | |
| 11 | Taranto | 34 | 8 | 15 | 11 | 26 | 32 | −6 | 31 | |
| 12 | L'Aquila | 34 | 8 | 15 | 11 | 29 | 37 | −8 | 31 | |
| 13 | Del Duca Ascoli | 34 | 10 | 10 | 14 | 34 | 40 | −6 | 30 | |
| 14 | Chieti | 34 | 9 | 12 | 13 | 28 | 35 | −7 | 30 | |
| 15 | Bisceglie | 34 | 10 | 10 | 14 | 26 | 36 | −10 | 30 | |
| 16 | Tevere Roma | 34 | 8 | 14 | 12 | 38 | 51 | −13 | 30 | |
| 17 | Crotone | 34 | 8 | 12 | 14 | 23 | 37 | −14 | 28 | Relegated to Serie D |
| 18 | Avellino | 34 | 8 | 10 | 16 | 36 | 49 | −13 | 26 | Relegated to Serie D |

== References and sources ==
- Almanacco Illustrato del Calcio – La Storia 1898–2004, Panini Edizioni, Modena, September 2005
