= List of international goals scored by Gigi Riva =

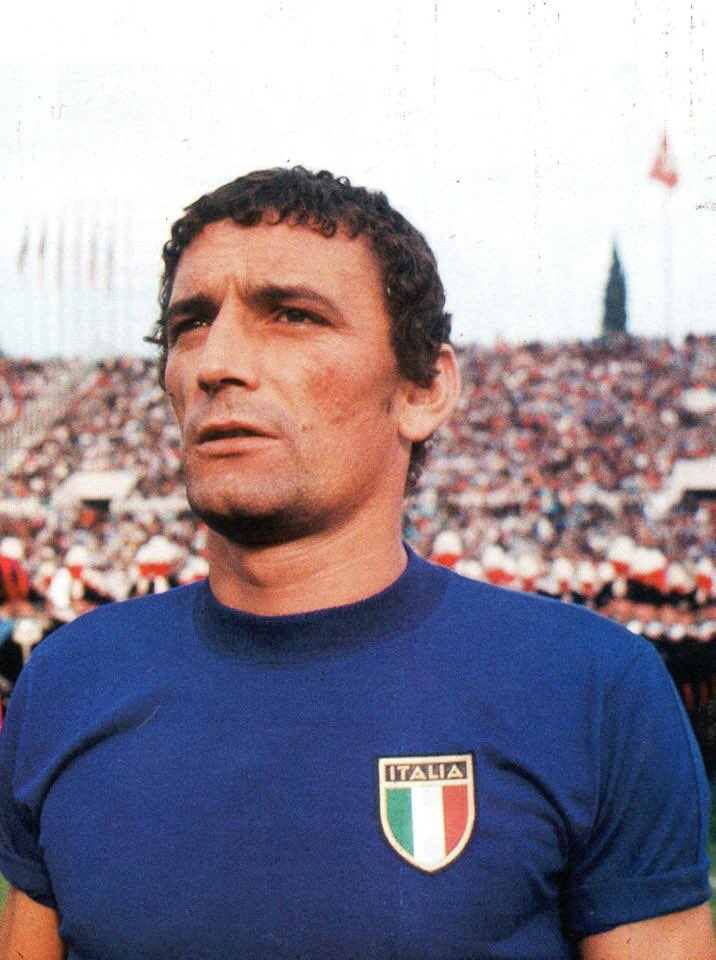
Gigi Riva scored 35 international goals in 42 appearances for Italy.

Gigi Riva was an Italian professional footballer who represented the Italy national football team as a forward. Since debuting for Italy against Hungary on 27 June 1965, Riva scored 35 goals in 42 appearances, making him the country's all-time top goalscorer. He scored his first international goal in his fourth appearance for his country on 1 November 1967, as part of a hat-trick scored against Cyprus during a UEFA Euro 1968 qualifying match. Riva made his last appearance for Italy on 19 June 1974 in a 1–1 draw against Argentina during the 1974 FIFA World Cup.

Riva scored a second hat-trick for his national team in a 4–1 win against Wales in a 1970 World Cup qualifier. He scored six times in total against Luxembourg, the most against any team. On 31 March 1973, he scored four goals against Luxembourg during a 1974 World Cup qualifier. He also scored a brace (two goals) seven times. Riva scored one goal at the UEFA European Championship, three goals at the World Cup, eight goals in friendly matches, nine goals in European Championship qualifiers and 14 goals in World Cup qualifiers.

Riva's first international tournament was the UEFA Euro 1968, where he scored the opening goal in the replay of the final helping Italy to a 2–0 win against Yugoslavia. Two years later, Riva scored three goals in the 1970 FIFA World Cup, twice against Mexico in a 4–1 victory in the quarter-finals and a goal in the 4–3 win against West Germany in the semi-finals after extra time.

== International goals ==
Scores and results list Italy's goal tally first, score column indicates score after each Riva goal.

Key
‡	Indicates goal was scored from a penalty kick

List of international goals scored by Gigi Riva
No.	Cap	Date	Venue	Opponent	Score	Result	Competition	Ref.
1	4	1 November 1967	Stadio San Vito, Cosenza, Italy	Cyprus	3–0	5–0	UEFA Euro 1968 qualifier	
2	4	1 November 1967	Stadio San Vito, Cosenza, Italy	Cyprus	4–0	5–0	UEFA Euro 1968 qualifier	
3	4	1 November 1967	Stadio San Vito, Cosenza, Italy	Cyprus	5–0	5–0	UEFA Euro 1968 qualifier	
4	5	18 November 1967	Wankdorf Stadium, Bern, Switzerland	Switzerland	1–1	2–2	UEFA Euro 1968 qualifier	
5	5	18 November 1967	Wankdorf Stadium, Bern, Switzerland	Switzerland	2–2 ‡	2–2	UEFA Euro 1968 qualifier	
6	6	23 December 1967	Stadio Amsicora, Cagliari, Italy	Switzerland	2–0	4–0	UEFA Euro 1968 qualifier	
7	7	10 June 1968	Stadio Olimpico, Rome, Italy	Yugoslavia	1–0	2–0	UEFA Euro 1968	
8	8	23 October 1968	Ninian Park, Cardiff, Wales	Wales	1–0	1–0	1970 FIFA World Cup qualifier	
9	9	1 January 1969	Estadio Azteca, Mexico City, Mexico	Mexico	1–1	3–2	Friendly	
10	9	1 January 1969	Estadio Azteca, Mexico City, Mexico	Mexico	3–2	3–2	Friendly	
11	11	29 March 1969	Friedrich-Ludwig-Jahn-Sportpark, East Berlin, East Germany	East Germany	1–1	2–2	1970 FIFA World Cup qualifier	
12	11	29 March 1969	Friedrich-Ludwig-Jahn-Sportpark, East Berlin, East Germany	East Germany	2–2	2–2	1970 FIFA World Cup qualifier	
13	13	4 November 1969	Stadio Olimpico, Rome, Italy	Wales	1–0	4–1	1970 FIFA World Cup qualifier	
14	13	4 November 1969	Stadio Olimpico, Rome, Italy	Wales	3–1	4–1	1970 FIFA World Cup qualifier	
15	13	4 November 1969	Stadio Olimpico, Rome, Italy	Wales	4–1	4–1	1970 FIFA World Cup qualifier	
16	14	22 November 1969	Stadio San Paolo, Naples, Italy	East Germany	3–0	3–0	1970 FIFA World Cup qualifier	
17	15	21 February 1970	Santiago Bernabéu Stadium, Madrid, Spain	Spain	2–0	2–2	Friendly	
18	16	10 May 1970	Estádio da Luz, Lisbon, Portugal	Portugal	1–0	2–1	Friendly	
19	16	10 May 1970	Estádio da Luz, Lisbon, Portugal	Portugal	2–0	2–1	Friendly	
20	20	14 June 1970	Estadio Nemesio Díez, Toluca, Mexico	Mexico	2–1	4–1	1970 FIFA World Cup	
21	20	14 June 1970	Estadio Nemesio Díez, Toluca, Mexico	Mexico	4–1	4–1	1970 FIFA World Cup	
22	21	17 June 1970	Estadio Azteca, Mexico City, Mexico	West Germany	3–2	4–3	1970 FIFA World Cup	
23	26	9 October 1971	San Siro, Milan, Italy	Sweden	1–0	3–0	UEFA Euro 1972 qualifier	
24	26	9 October 1971	San Siro, Milan, Italy	Sweden	3–0	3–0	UEFA Euro 1972 qualifier	
25	30	13 May 1972	King Baudouin Stadium, Brussels, Belgium	Belgium	2–1 ‡	2–1	UEFA Euro 1972 qualifier	
26	31	20 September 1972	Stadio Municipale, Turin, Italy	Yugoslavia	1–0	3–1	Friendly	
27	32	7 October 1972	Stade Josy Barthel, Luxembourg City, Luxembourg	Luxembourg	2–0	4–0	1974 FIFA World Cup qualifier	
28	32	7 October 1972	Stade Josy Barthel, Luxembourg City, Luxembourg	Luxembourg	3–0	4–0	1974 FIFA World Cup qualifier	
29	36	31 March 1973	Stadio Luigi Ferraris, Genoa, Italy	Luxembourg	1–0	5–0	1974 FIFA World Cup qualifier	
30	36	31 March 1973	Stadio Luigi Ferraris, Genoa, Italy	Luxembourg	2–0	5–0	1974 FIFA World Cup qualifier	
31	36	31 March 1973	Stadio Luigi Ferraris, Genoa, Italy	Luxembourg	4–0	5–0	1974 FIFA World Cup qualifier	
32	36	31 March 1973	Stadio Luigi Ferraris, Genoa, Italy	Luxembourg	5–0	5–0	1974 FIFA World Cup qualifier	
33	37	9 June 1973	Stadio Olimpico, Rome, Italy	Brazil	1–0	2–0	Friendly	
34	38	29 September 1973	San Siro, Milan, Italy	Sweden	2–0	2–0	Friendly	
35	39	20 October 1973	Stadio Olimpico, Rome, Italy	Switzerland	2–0	2–0	1974 FIFA World Cup qualifier	

== Statistics ==
Goals by year
Year	Competitive		Friendly		Total	
Year	Apps	Goals	Apps	Goals	Apps	Goals
1965	0	0	1	0	1	0
1966	0	0	1	0	1	0
1967	3	6	1	0	4	6
1968	2	2	0	0	2	2
1969	3	6	3	2	6	8
1970	7	3	3	3	10	6
1971	1	0	2	2	3	2
1972	4	3	2	1	6	4
1973	4	5	3	2	7	7
1974	2	0	0	0	2	0
Total	27	25	15	10	42	35

Goals by competition
Competition	Apps	Goals
FIFA World Cup	8	3
FIFA World Cup qualification	10	14
Friendlies	15	8
UEFA European Championship	1	1
UEFA European Championship qualification	8	9
Total	42	35
