= Mario Bertini =

Italian footballer

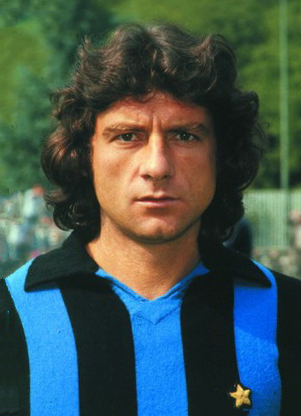
- Bertini with Inter Milan c. 1970

Personal information
- Date of birth: 7 January 1944 (age 82)
- Place of birth: Prato, Italy
- Position: Midfielder

Senior career*
Years	Team	Apps	(Gls)
1962–1963	Prato	3	(0)
1963–1964	Empoli	31	(7)
1964–1968	Fiorentina	97	(12)
1968–1977	Inter Milan	211	(31)
1977–1978	Rimini	22	(0)
Total		364	(50)

International career
1966–1972	Italy	25	(2)
Medal record
Representing Italy
Men's Football
FIFA World Cup
Runner-up	1970 Mexico
- * Club domestic league appearances and goals

Mario Bertini (Italian pronunciation: [ˈmaːrjo berˈtiːni]; born 7 January 1944) is an Italian former professional footballer who played as a defender and midfielder. Throughout his career Bertini played for Italian clubs Empoli, Fiorentina, Inter Milan, Prato, and Rimini; he spent nine seasons with Inter, winning a Serie A title in 1971. At international level, he played for the Italy national team on 25 occasions between 1966 and 1972, scoring twice, and was a member of the team that reached the 1970 FIFA World Cup Final.

== Club career ==
During his Serie A club career, Bertini played for several Italian teams: Empoli (1963–64), Fiorentina (1964–68), and most notably Inter Milan (1968–77), where he remained for nine seasons, winning the Scudetto in 1971; he had previously also won a Coppa Italia and a Mitropa Cup double with Fiorentina in 1966. He also won the Serie C in 1963 whilst playing with Prato for a season (1962–63). He ended his career in Serie B, in 1978, after a season with Rimini (1977–78).

== International career ==
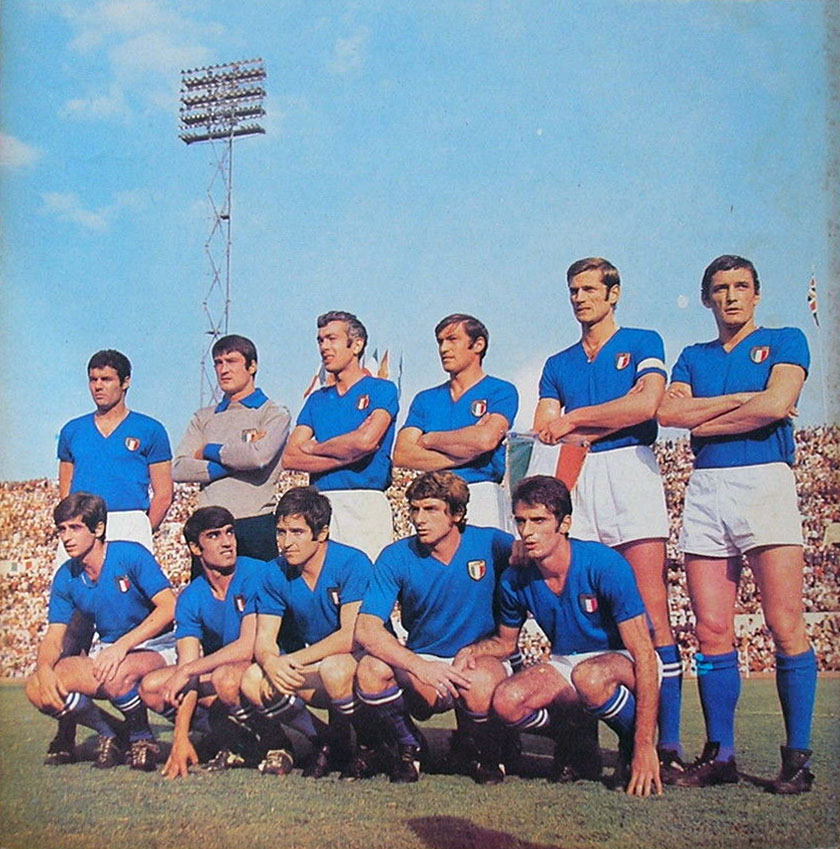
Bertini (kneeling, second from the right) with the Italy national team in 1969

Bertini earned 25 caps for the Italy national team between 1966 and 1972. He missed out on the 22-man Italy squad for the 1966 FIFA World Cup, although he was still brought to England by manager Edmondo Fabbri, along with Luigi Riva, as an additional reserve in order to gain experience with the national side. Bertini played in the 1970 FIFA World Cup, where he wore the number 10 shirt, as Italy managed a second-place finish. In the final, he marked Pelé in his movements in depth outside the area, although Brazil eventually defeated Italy 4–1.

== Style of play ==
Considered a quick, well-rounded, and hard-working defensive midfielder, Bertini primarily served as a ball-winner, he was a complete midfielder who was also known for his eye for goal from midfield, due to his powerful striking ability from distance, as well as his accuracy from penalties and ability to make later attacking runs from behind into the penalty area.

== Honours ==
Fiorentina

- Coppa Italia: 1965–66
- Mitropa Cup: 1966

Inter Milan

- Serie A: 1970–71

Prato

- Serie C: 1962–63
