= 1970 Ballon d'Or =

Annual association football award event in France

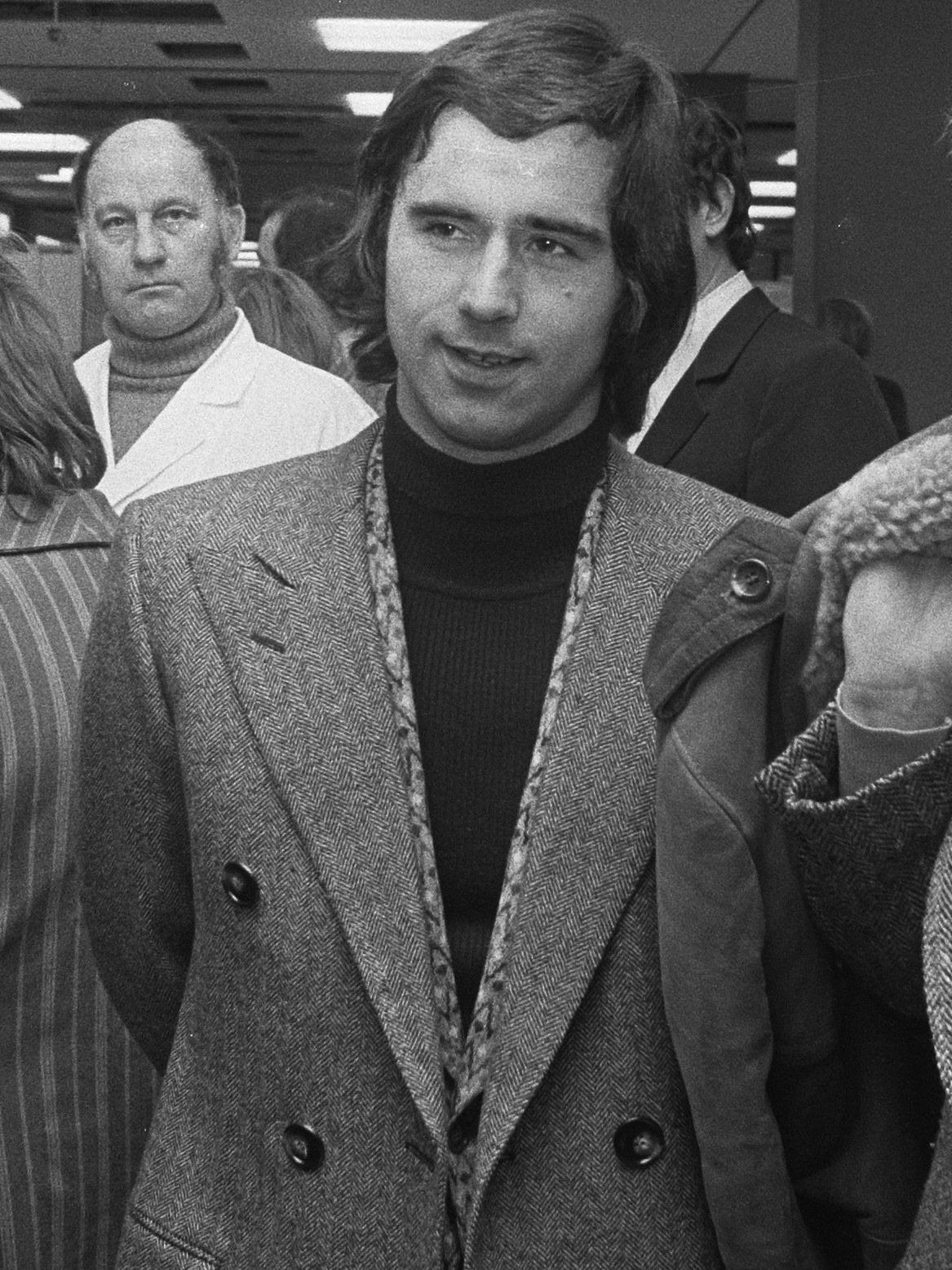
- 1970 Ballon d'Or winner, Gerd Müller
- Date: 29 December 1970
- Location: Paris, France
- Presented by: France Football

Highlights
- Won by: (West Germany) Gerd Müller (1st award)
- Website: ballondor.com

The 1970 Ballon d'Or, given to the best football player in Europe as judged by a panel of sports journalists from UEFA member countries, was awarded to the West German forward Gerd Müller on 29 December 1970. There were 26 voters, from Austria, Belgium, Bulgaria, Czechoslovakia, Denmark, East Germany, England, Finland, France, Greece, Hungary, Italy, Luxembourg, the Netherlands, Norway, Poland, Portugal, Republic of Ireland, Romania, Soviet Union, Spain, Sweden, Switzerland, Turkey, West Germany and Yugoslavia. Müller became the first West German national and the first Bayern Munich player to win the Ballon d'Or.

== Rankings ==
Rank	Name	Club(s)	Nationality	Points
1	Gerd Müller	(West Germany) Bayern Munich	West Germany	77
2	Bobby Moore	(England) West Ham United	England	70
3	Gigi Riva	(Italy) Cagliari	Italy	65
4	Franz Beckenbauer	(West Germany) Bayern Munich	West Germany	32
5	Wolfgang Overath	(West Germany) 1. FC Köln	West Germany	29
6	Dragan Džajić	(Socialist Federal Republic of Yugoslavia) Red Star Belgrade	Yugoslavia	24
7	Johan Cruyff	(Netherlands) Ajax	Netherlands	13
8	Gordon Banks	(England) Stoke City	England	8
8	Sandro Mazzola	(Italy) Internazionale	Italy	8
10	Rinus Israël	(Netherlands) Feyenoord	Netherlands	7
10	Gianni Rivera	(Italy) Milan	Italy	7
10	Uwe Seeler	(West Germany) Hamburger SV	West Germany	7
10	Albert Shesternyov	(Soviet Union) CSKA Moscow	Soviet Union	7
14	Angelo Domenghini	(Italy) Cagliari	Italy	4
14	Ove Kindvall	(Netherlands) Feyenoord	Sweden	4
14	Francis Lee	(England) Manchester City	England	4
14	Willem van Hanegem	(Netherlands) Feyenoord	Netherlands	4
18	Alan Ball	(England) Everton	England	3
18	Terry Cooper	(England) Leeds United	England	3
18	Giacinto Facchetti	(Italy) Internazionale	Italy	3
18	Geoff Hurst	(England) West Ham United	England	3
22	Eusébio	(Portugal) Benfica	Portugal	2
22	Josip Skoblar	(France) Marseille	Yugoslavia	2
24	Cornel Dinu	(Romania) Dinamo București	Romania	1
24	Jean Djorkaeff	(France) Paris Saint-Germain	France	1
24	Florea Dumitrache	(Romania) Dinamo București	Romania	1
24	Franz Hasil	(Netherlands) Feyenoord	Austria	1
24	Hans-Jürgen Kreische	(East Germany) Dynamo Dresden	East Germany	1
24	Carles Rexach	(Spain) Barcelona	Spain	1
