= 1969 Ballon d'Or =

Annual association football award event in France

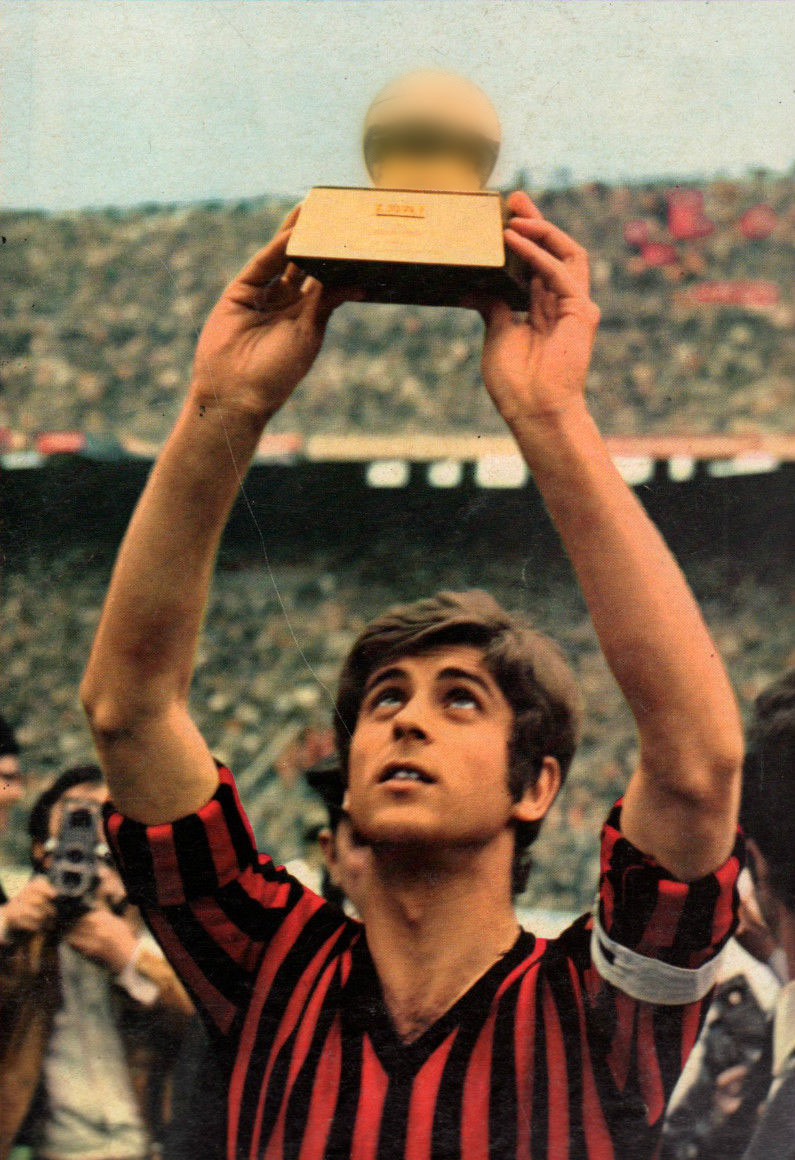
- 1969 Ballon d'Or winner, Gianni Rivera
- Date: 23 December 1969
- Location: Paris, France
- Presented by: France Football

Highlights
- Won by: (Italy) Gianni Rivera (1st award)
- Website: ballondor.com

The 1969 Ballon d'Or, given to the best football player in Europe as judged by a panel of sports journalists from UEFA member countries, was awarded to the Italian midfielder Gianni Rivera (Milan) on 23 December 1969. There were 26 voters, from Austria, Belgium, Bulgaria, Czechoslovakia, Denmark, East Germany, England, Finland, France, Greece, Hungary, Italy, Luxembourg, the Netherlands, Norway, Poland, Portugal, Republic of Ireland, Romania, Soviet Union, Spain, Sweden, Switzerland, Turkey, West Germany and Yugoslavia. Rivera became the second Italian to win the award, after Omar Sívori in 1961. He was also the first Milan player to win the trophy.

== Rankings ==
Rank	Name	Club(s)	Nationality	Points
1	Gianni Rivera	(Italy) Milan	Italy	83
2	Gigi Riva	(Italy) Cagliari	Italy	79
3	Gerd Müller	(Germany) Bayern Munich	West Germany	38
4	Johan Cruyff	(Netherlands) Ajax	Netherlands	30
4	Ove Kindvall	(Netherlands) Feyenoord	Sweden	30
6	George Best	(England) Manchester United	Northern Ireland	21
7	Franz Beckenbauer	(Germany) Bayern Munich	West Germany	18
8	Pierino Prati	(Italy) Milan	Italy	17
9	Petar Zhekov	(Bulgaria) CSKA Sofia	Bulgaria	14
10	Jack Charlton	(England) Leeds United	England	10
11	Albert Shesternyov	(Soviet Union) CSKA Moscow	Soviet Union	8
12	Dragan Džajić	(Socialist Federal Republic of Yugoslavia) Red Star Belgrade	Yugoslavia	6
13	Francis Lee	(England) Manchester City	England	4
13	Martin Peters	(England) West Ham United	England	4
15	Jozef Adamec	(Czechoslovakia) Spartak Trnava	Czechoslovakia	3
15	Bobby Charlton	(England) Manchester United	England	3
15	Angelo Sormani	(Italy) Milan	Italy	3
18	Ferenc Bene	(Hungary) Újpest	Hungary	2
18	Andrej Kvašňák	(Belgium) KRC Mechelen	Czechoslovakia	2
18	Louis Pilot	(Belgium) Standard Liège	Luxembourg	2
18	Giorgos Sideris	(Greece) Olympiacos	Greece	2
18	Manuel Velázquez	(Spain) Real Madrid	Spain	2
23	Billy Bremner	(England) Leeds United	Scotland	1
23	Kazimierz Deyna	(Poland) Legia Warsaw	Poland	1
23	Mimis Domazos	(Greece) Panathinaikos	Greece	1
23	Gilbert Gress	(Germany) VfB Stuttgart	France	1
23	Jimmy Johnstone	(Scotland) Celtic	Scotland	1
23	Włodzimierz Lubański	(Poland) Górnik Zabrze	Poland	1
23	Vladimir Muntyan	(Soviet Union) Dynamo Kyiv	Soviet Union	1
23	Wilfried Van Moer	(Belgium) Standard Liège	Belgium	1
23	Ivo Viktor	(Czechoslovakia) Dukla Prague	Czechoslovakia	1
