= Mario Martiradonna =

Italian footballer

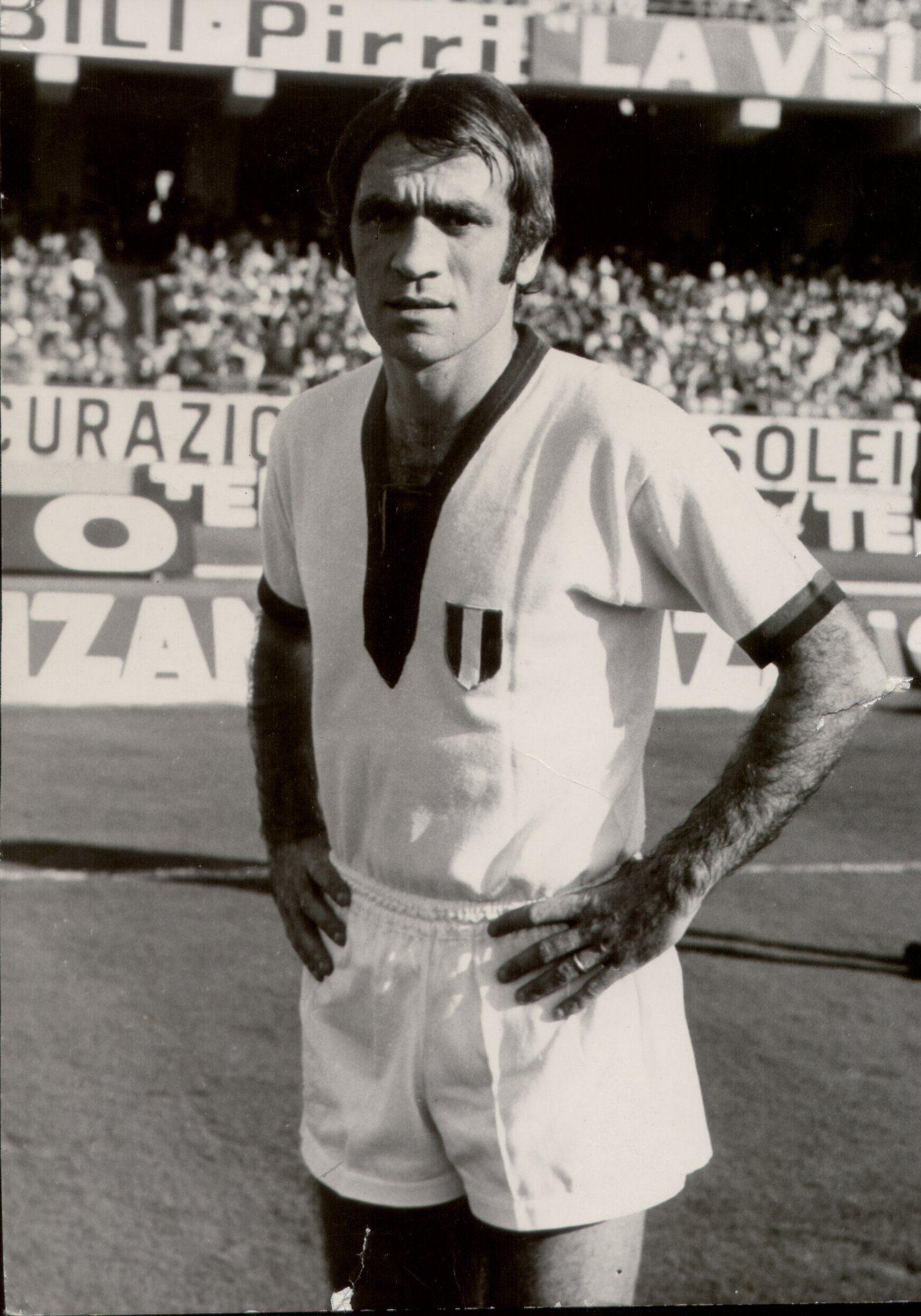
- Mario Martiradonna with Cagliari in the 1970–71 season
- Born: 28 August 1938
- Died: 20 November 2011 (aged 73)

Mario Martiradonna (28 August 1938 – 20 November 2011) was an Italian footballer who played as a defender.

== Career ==
Raised in Melfi, with whom he played three fourth series championships, after being rejected in a trial in Basilicata by Montescaglioso, he made his Serie C debut in 1959, with Teramo. The following year he moved to Reggiana, in Serie B, and wore the shirt for two seasons.

In 1962 he moved to Cagliari, a team to which he remained linked for the rest of his competitive career, obtaining the Sardinians' first promotion to Serie A ( 1963-1964 ) and the 1969-70 scudetto; he was one of three players who celebrated both historic milestones, in addition to Ricciotti Greatti and Gigi Riva.

In Serie A he played a total of 239 games and scored 4 goals. The first was in Cagliari-Lazio (3-0) on 4 April 1965, the second in Cagliari-Bologna (1-1) on 28 January 1968, the third in Cagliari-Fiorentina (2-0) on 22 November 1970 and the fourth and last in Cagliari-Palermo (2-0) on 15 October 1972.

== Acknowledgements ==
- Cagliari included him in their Hall of fame.
- He is included in the Top 11 Rossoblù - The strongest of all time, the lineup voted by the fans including the best rossoblù of all time.

== Honours ==
- 1969-70 Serie A
