= Cesare Poli =

Italian footballer (1945–2024)

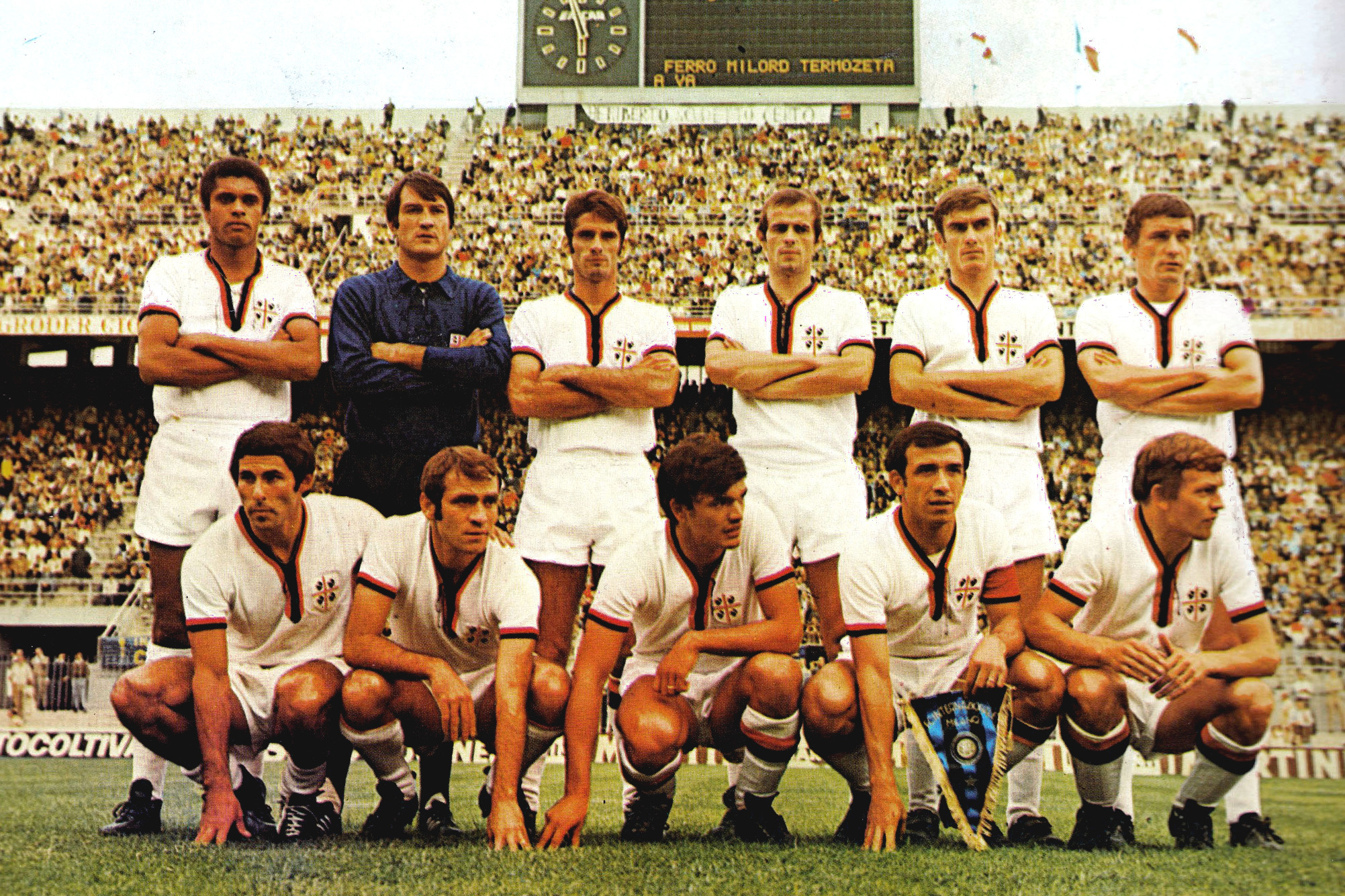
- Poli (front row, far right) with Cagliari in 1969

Personal information
- Date of birth: 6 January 1945
- Place of birth: Breganze, Italy
- Date of death: 7 September 2024 (aged 79)
- Height: 1.77 m (5 ft 10 in)
- Position: Defender

Senior career*
Years	Team	Apps	(Gls)
1965–1967	Lanerossi Vicenza	42	(0)
1967–1969	Inter Milan	17	(0)
1969–1971	Cagliari	35	(0)
1971–1973	Vicenza	53	(2)
1973–1975	Cagliari	48	(0)
- * Club domestic league appearances and goals

Cesare Poli (6 January 1945 – 7 September 2024) was an Italian professional footballer who made 195 appearances in Serie A playing as a defender for Lanerossi Vicenza, Inter Milan and Cagliari. Poli died on 7 September 2024, at the age of 79.

== Honours ==
Cagliari

- Serie A: 1969–70
