= Comunardo Niccolai =

Italian footballer (1946–2024)

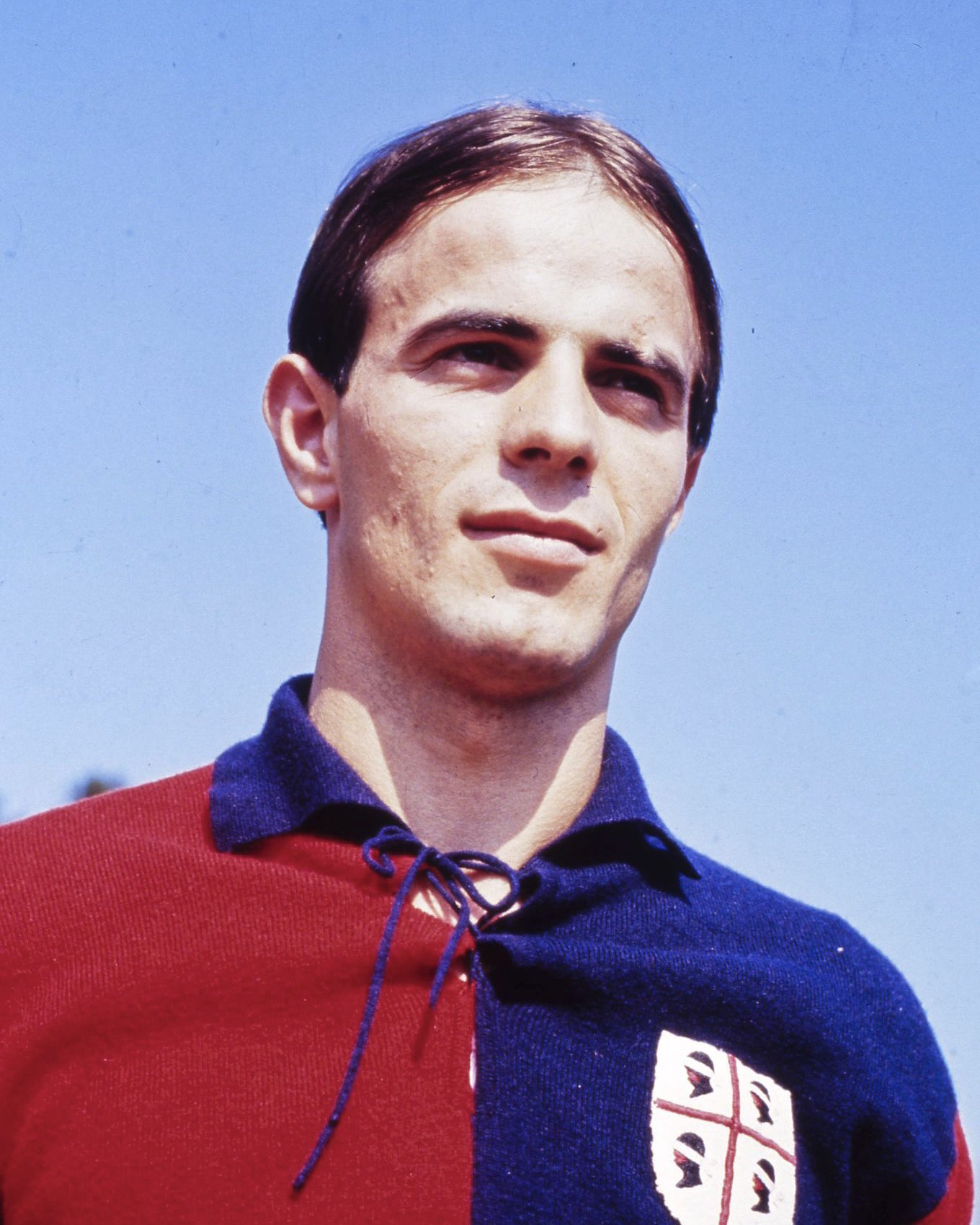
- Niccolai with Cagliari in the 1960s

Personal information
- Date of birth: 15 December 1946
- Place of birth: Uzzano, Italy
- Date of death: 2 July 2024 (aged 77)
- Place of death: Pistoia, Italy
- Height: 1.77 m (5 ft 10 in)
- Position: Centre-back

Senior career*
Years	Team	Apps	(Gls)
1963–1964	Torres	22	(0)
1964–1976	Cagliari	218	(4)
1976–1977	Perugia	7	(0)
1977–1978	Prato	4	(0)
Total		251	(4)

International career
1970	Italy	3	(0)
Medal record
Representing Italy
Men's Football
FIFA World Cup
Runner-up	1970 Mexico
- * Club domestic league appearances and goals

Comunardo Niccolai (Italian pronunciation: [komuˈnardo nikkoˈlai]; 15 December 1946 – 2 July 2024) was an Italian footballer who played as a defender.

== Club career ==
A tough, physically strong centre-back, Niccolai initially began his career with Torres in 1963, before joining Cagliari, where he played from 1964 to 1976, winning the only Serie A championship in the club's entire club history in 1970. He ended his career in 1977 with Perugia. Niccolai played 218 Serie A matches, and is still remembered today for his proneness to score own goals, including some very spectacular ones.

== International career ==
Niccolai made three appearances for the Italy national team in 1970, and represented the team at the 1970 FIFA World Cup, where he won a runners-up medal; he only appeared in Italy's opening group match, a 1–0 win against Sweden on 3 June, as he was replaced by Roberto Rosato in the 37th minute, after sustaining an injury which kept him out of the remainder of the tournament. This led his Cagliari coach Manlio Scopigno to declare: "I could expect everything from my life, but to see Niccolai in international telecast".

== After retirement ==
Niccolai worked with the Italian Football Federation as national team scout. He also worked as a youth coach for the Cagliari under-18 side.

Niccolai died on 2 July 2024, at the age of 77.

== Honours ==
Cagliari

- Serie A: 1969–70

Italy

- FIFA World Cup runner-up: 1970
