= Potenza SC =

Italian football club

Potenza
- Full name: Potenza Sport Club S.r.l.
- Nicknames: Rossoblù (Red-Blues); Leoni (Lions)
- Founded: 2004 (re-founded)
- Dissolved: 2011
- Ground: Stadio Alfredo Viviani, Potenza, Italy
- Capacity: 5,500
Home colours

Potenza Sport Club S.r.l. was an Italian football club, based in Potenza, Basilicata. The club was re-founded in 2004 as A.S. Calcio Potenza, (legal suffix S.r.l. was added circa 2005) after the merger of the old A.S.C. Potenza (founded in 1983) and F.C. Potenza (founded in 1994 and previously known as Potenza S.C.), and changed its name to Potenza S.C. in 2006. The club was expelled from 2009–10 Lega Pro Prima Divisione in mid-season.

== History ==
Potenza was promoted in Serie C1 on 18 June 2007 by beating Benevento over two games in the 2006–07 Serie C2 promotion playoffs.

Potenza also took part in five Serie B seasons from 1963–64 to 1967–68. The biggest success of her was finishing 5th in Serie B in 1964–65 season.

In March 2010 Potenza was excluded from the Lega Pro Prima Divisione with immediate effect after the club was found guilt of matchfixing regarding a league game against Salernitana in April 2008. The verdict was partly reverted on appeal, where it was allowed Potenza to complete the season; however, the club will nevertheless appear as last-placed in the final table, thus forcing the club to play in the Lega Pro Seconda Divisione for the 2010–11 season. In July 2010 the club was excluded by the Italian football federation due to financial problems, and successively admitted into the Eccellenza amateur league. However, the club did not participate in any league in 2011–12 season.

In April 2012, the membership of the club in Italian Football Federation.

== Notable former players ==
Former Italian internationals and under-21 internationals

- (Italy) Aldo Agroppi
- (Italy) Roberto Boninsegna
- (Italy) Francesco Colonnese
