= Adriano Reginato =

Italian footballer (born 1937)

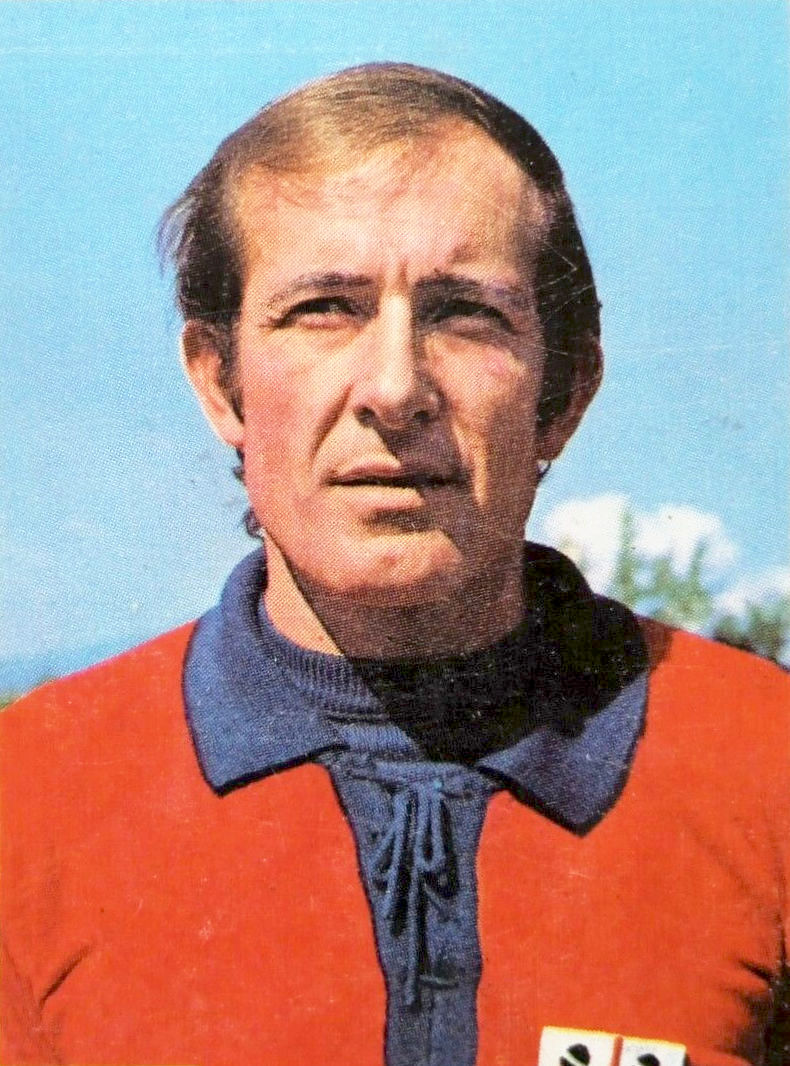
- Reginato with Cagliari in 1971

Personal information
- Date of birth: 19 December 1937 (age 88)
- Place of birth: Carbonera, Italy
- Position: Goalkeeper

Senior career*
Years	Team	Apps	(Gls)
1961–1963	Treviso	42	(-)
1963–1965	Torino	11	(-)
1965–1966	L.R. Vicenza	20	(-)
1966–1973	Cagliari	43	(-)
- * Club domestic league appearances and goals

Adriano Reginato (born 19 December 1937) is an Italian former footballer who played as a goalkeeper.

== Career ==
Reginato began his career with Treviso in Serie C1 in 1961, later moving to Torino F.C. in 1963, spending two seasons with the club as their backup keeper, and also making his Serie A debut during that time. In 1965, he moved to Vicenza for a season, alternating with Franco Luison as the club's starting goalkeeper, and helping the club to a 6th-place finish in Serie A during the 1965–66 season, as well as a quarter-final finish in the Coppa Italia. He is mostly remembered for his time with Cagliari (1966–1973). As the team's starting keeper, he became one of Serie A's top keepers, and he established a new record of 712 consecutive minutes without conceding a goal in Serie A between the 1965–66 and the 1966–67 seasons, which was later broken by Dino Zoff, and subsequently, Sebastiano Rossi and Gianluigi Buffon. In his later career, as the team's backup goalkeeper behind Enrico Albertosi, he helped the team to win their first historic Scudetto during the 1969–70 Serie A season, without conceding a goal in his single league appearance, before retiring from professional Italian football in 1973.

== Honours ==
Cagliari

- Serie A: 1969–70
