= Manlio Scopigno =

Italian football player and manager

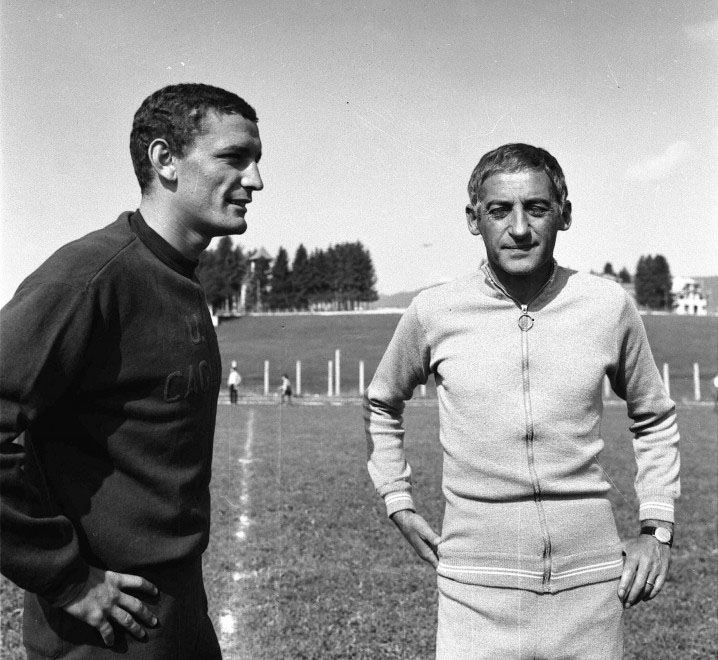

Personal information
- Date of birth: 20 November 1925
- Place of birth: Paularo, Italy
- Date of death: 25 September 1993 (aged 67)
- Place of death: Rieti, Italy
- Position: Right-back

Senior career*
Years	Team	Apps	(Gls)
1946–1948	Rieti	56	(0)
1948–1951	Salernitana	87	(8)
1951–1953	Napoli	7	(1)
1953–1954	Catanzaro	6	(0)

Managerial career
- 1953–1955: Rieti
- 1955–1957: Todi
- 1957–1958: Rieti
- 1958–1959: Ortona
- 1959–1961: Vicenza (assistant)
- 1961–1965: Vicenza
- 1965–1966: Bologna
- 1966–1967: Cagliari
- 1967: Chicago Mustangs
- 1968–1972: Cagliari
- 1973: Roma
- 1974–1976: Vicenza
- * Club domestic league appearances and goals

Manlio Scopigno (20 November 1925 – 25 September 1993) was an Italian professional football player and coach. Known as "il Filosofo" (the Philosopher), he is best known for coaching Cagliari to win their only Serie A title in 1970.

== Playing career ==
Born in Paularo, in the province of Udine, he moved to Rieti at a young age. He began playing as a right-back for Rieti between the Serie C and Serie B.

He moved to Salernitana, with whom he played in the Serie B; in the 1948–49 season, Scopigno played as a goalkeeper against Lecce due to Aldo De Fazio's injury; he conceded four goals.

In 1951, he joined Napoli. After scoring his first Serie A goal against Como, Scopigno suffered a knee injury in 1951; this ultimately ended his career, as he only played a few more games for Napoli and Catanzaro.

== Managerial career ==
After having coached Rieti, Todi and Ortona, Scopigno was appointed assistant coach of Vicenza in 1959. He became head coach in 1961, remaining in charge until 1965.

Scopigno had a short experience with Bologna in the 1965–66 Serie A, before being appointed head coach of newly-promoted side Cagliari in 1966. In 1967, Cagliari participated in the United Soccer Association as the "Chicago Mustangs"; Scopigno led his side to a third-place finish. He helped Cagliari win their first Serie A title in the 1969–70 season. Scopigno left in 1972.

Scopigno ended his coaching career having also taken charge of Roma in 1973 and Vicenza between 1974 and 1976.

== Honours ==
=== Manager ===
Cagliari

- Serie A: 1969–70

Individual

- Italian Football Hall of Fame: 2023
