= Corrado Nastasio =

Italian footballer (born 1946)

Personal information
- Date of birth: 3 January 1946 (age 80)
- Place of birth: Livorno, Italy
- Position: Striker

Senior career*
Years	Team	Apps	(Gls)
1963–1964	Rosignano Solvay	26	(3)
1964–1965	Reggiana	8	(0)
1965–1968	Livorno	56	(7)
1968–1969	Atalanta	29	(5)
1969–1971	Cagliari	7	(1)
1971–1972	Modena	18	(0)
1972–1973	Lucchese	16	(1)
1973–1974	Novara	23	(0)
1974–1976	Lecce	62	(4)
1976–1977	Brindisi	31	(1)
Total		276	(22)
- * Club domestic league appearances and goals

Corrado Nastasio (born 3 January 1946) is an Italian former professional footballer who played as a striker.

== Career ==
Born in Livorno, Nastasio played for Rosignano Solvay, Reggiana, Livorno, Atalanta, Cagliari, Modena, Lucchese, Novara, Lecce and Brindisi. He retired from football at the age of 31 following his son's illness.

== Later life ==
After retiring, Nastasio became worked in the Italian lower leagues before becoming a dockworker. He continued to support hometown club Livorno, and in October 2012 was the only Livorno fan who travelled for a match against Reggina.
