= Pierluigi Cera =

Italian footballer

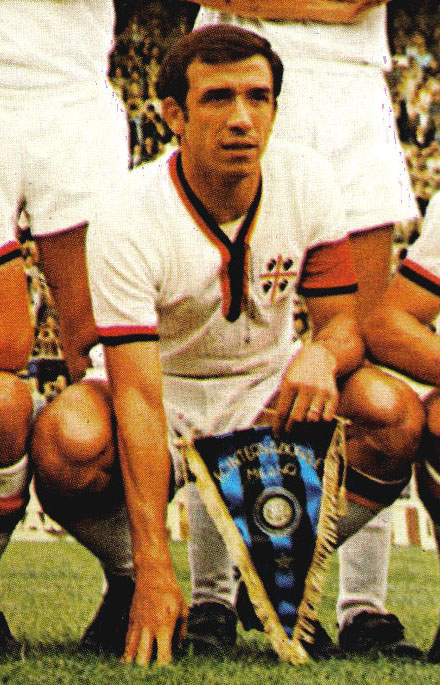
- Cera at Cagliari in 1969

Personal information
- Full name: Pierluigi Cera
- Date of birth: 25 February 1941 (age 85)
- Place of birth: Legnago, Verona, Italy
- Height: 1.72 m (5 ft 8 in)
- Positions: Midfielder; defender

Senior career*
Years	Team	Apps	(Gls)
1957–1964	Verona	141	(7)
1964–1973	Cagliari	240	(4)
1973–1979	Cesena	97	(0)
Total		478	(11)

International career
1963	Italy under-21	7	(0)
1969–1972	Italy	18	(0)
Medal record
Representing Italy
Men's Football
FIFA World Cup
Runner-up	1970 Mexico
- * Club domestic league appearances and goals

Pierluigi Cera (Italian pronunciation: [ˌpjɛrluˈiːdʒi ˈtʃeːra]; born 25 February 1941) is a former Italian footballer who played as a midfielder or as a defender, most notably for Cagliari, and the Italy national football team.

== Club career ==
Cera was born in Legnago. During his club career, he played for Verona (1957–64), Cagliari (1964–73), and Cesena (1973–79). He made his Serie A debut with Verona, in a 2–0 away defeat to Milan on 4 May 1958. He later captained Cagliari to the Serie A title in 1970, the first and only league title in the club's history.

== International career ==
At international level, Cera earned 18 caps for the Italy national football team between 1969 and 1972; he made his debut on 22 November 1969, in a 3–0 win over East Germany in a World Cup qualifier, and subsequently played in the 1970 FIFA World Cup, including the final against Brazil, in which Italy finished in second place following a 4–1 defeat.

== Style of play ==
A versatile player, Cera was capable of playing both as a midfield playmaker, and also as a defender. He occupied the role of a Libero or sweeper in his later career, due to his vision, passing, creativity, and ability to bring the ball out from the back, as well as his consistent defensive attributes, which made him, alongside Franz Beckenbauer, one of the first offensive sweepers of his time.

== Honours ==
=== Club ===
Cagliari

- Serie A: 1969–70

=== International ===
Italy

- FIFA World Cup (Runner-up): 1970

=== Individual ===
- Cagliari Greatest XI of all-time
