= 1963–64 Serie B =

Italian football league season

Serie B
- Season: 1963–64
- Champions: Varese; 1st title

Serie B 1963-64 team distribution

The Serie B 1963–64 was the thirty-second tournament of this competition played in Italy since its creation.

== Teams ==
Varese, Prato and Potenza had been promoted from Serie C, while Napoli, Venezia and Palermo had been relegated from Serie A.

== Final classification ==
Pos	Team	Pld	W	D	L	GF	GA	GR	Pts	Promotion or relegation
1	Varese (P, C)	38	17	17	4	44	19	2.316	51	Promotion to Serie A
2	Cagliari (P)	38	16	17	5	44	23	1.913	49	Promotion to Serie A
3	Foggia (P)	38	15	16	7	42	27	1.556	46	Promotion to Serie A
4	Padova	38	16	13	9	43	27	1.593	45	
5	Lecco	38	15	14	9	36	29	1.241	44	
5	Verona	38	15	14	9	44	31	1.419	44	
7	Brescia (Note: 7 points deducted.) (D)	38	18	11	9	55	28	1.964	40	
8	Napoli	38	12	15	11	39	35	1.114	39	
9	Potenza	38	10	18	10	31	28	1.107	38	
10	Triestina	38	11	15	12	28	33	0.848	37	
10	Catanzaro	38	13	11	14	38	47	0.809	37	
12	Palermo	38	9	17	12	25	28	0.893	35	
13	Pro Patria	38	9	15	14	35	42	0.833	33	
13	Venezia	38	10	13	15	32	44	0.727	33	
15	Alessandria	38	9	14	15	27	48	0.563	32	
15	Parma	38	8	16	14	31	43	0.721	32	
15	Simmenthal-Monza (Note: A.S. Simmenthal-Monza changed back its denomination to A.C. Monza at the end of the season.)	38	8	16	14	32	46	0.696	32	
18	Prato (R)	38	8	15	15	31	44	0.705	31	Relegation to Serie C
19	Udinese (R)	38	9	11	18	28	40	0.700	29	Relegation to Serie C
20	Cosenza (R)	38	8	10	20	23	46	0.500	26	Relegation to Serie C

Source: Panini
(C) Champions; (D) Disqualified; (P) Promoted; (R) Relegated

== Results ==
Home \ Away	ALE	BRE	CAG	CTZ	COS	FOG	LCO	NAP	PAD	PAL	PAR	POT	PRA	PPA	SMN	TRI	UDI	VAR	VEN	HEL
Alessandria		1–2	0–0	1–1	0–0	3–2	1–1	1–2	2–1	0–0	1–1	0–0	0–0	0–0	1–1	2–0	1–0	0–1	3–1	1–2
Brescia	4–0		3–0	5–0	6–0	1–1	1–2	1–1	2–0	1–1	2–1	2–0	1–1	2–1	2–0	2–0	1–0	1–0	3–0	0–0
Cagliari	1–1	3–1		1–0	1–0	1–0	0–0	2–2	1–1	3–0	2–0	1–0	0–0	3–1	2–1	0–0	0–0	0–0	2–0	0–0
Catanzaro	2–0	2–0	2–2		2–0	1–0	2–1	1–0	1–0	3–1	2–1	0–0	1–0	1–1	1–1	0–0	1–0	1–1	1–0	2–2
Cosenza	0–1	1–2	1–3	2–1		1–3	0–0	0–0	1–0	1–0	2–0	1–0	2–0	0–0	0–2	0–0	1–0	0–1	3–0	1–1
Foggia	4–0	1–1	0–0	1–0	1–0		2–1	1–0	0–0	1–0	1–1	3–1	3–0	4–1	1–1	1–1	1–0	1–0	0–1	1–0
Lecco	2–1	1–0	2–0	3–1	1–0	1–1		1–0	0–2	2–0	2–0	0–0	2–0	1–0	2–0	2–0	1–0	1–1	1–1	0–0
Napoli	1–1	1–4	2–1	1–0	2–0	3–0	0–0		0–1	0–0	2–0	1–2	3–0	3–1	1–2	1–0	3–1	1–1	1–0	1–1
Padova	5–0	1–0	0–0	5–0	3–0	1–0	1–0	2–1		1–0	2–2	2–0	2–4	1–0	1–2	1–0	0–0	0–0	1–0	1–2
Palermo	0–0	1–0	0–1	0–0	2–2	0–0	0–0	4–0	0–1		0–0	0–1	1–0	0–0	0–0	3–3	1–0	0–0	0–0	2–0
Parma	0–0	0–2	1–0	1–0	2–1	0–0	1–0	2–2	1–1	0–1		2–2	1–0	0–2	1–0	1–1	3–1	2–2	1–2	0–0
Potenza	3–1	0–0	1–0	1–1	1–1	0–0	4–0	0–1	1–1	2–0	0–0		1–1	1–1	1–0	3–1	0–1	0–0	2–0	1–1
Prato	2–0	0–0	1–2	2–0	2–0	0–0	1–0	0–0	0–0	2–1	1–1	0–0		1–3	2–2	0–0	1–1	0–2	3–0	0–1
Pro Patria	0–1	1–1	0–1	3–1	2–0	1–1	0–1	2–2	1–1	0–0	1–0	0–0	2–1		1–1	0–1	0–1	1–0	3–2	1–1
Simm.-Monza	0–2	0–0	0–5	2–4	0–0	1–2	1–1	1–1	0–0	0–1	1–1	1–0	1–1	1–0		0–2	3–1	1–4	0–1	2–1
Triestina	0–1	1–0	0–0	1–0	2–1	1–1	0–0	1–0	0–0	1–3	3–1	1–0	0–0	2–0	0–2		1–0	1–1	2–2	0–0
Udinese	1–0	1–0	1–1	1–1	3–1	1–1	2–2	0–0	0–1	0–1	1–1	2–0	2–3	0–2	2–1	1–0		0–0	1–1	0–1
Varese	4–0	4–0	2–2	1–0	1–0	2–1	0–0	1–0	1–1	0–0	2–1	1–1	2–0	3–0	0–0	1–0	1–0		2–0	1–0
Venezia	1–0	0–0	0–0	3–1	0–0	1–2	3–2	0–0	2–0	1–1	0–1	0–0	4–2	2–2	1–1	1–2	0–1	0–0		1–0
Hellas Verona	3–0	1–2	0–3	3–1	1–0	0–0	3–0	0–0	3–2	2–1	1–0	1–2	3–0	1–1	0–0	2–0	4–2	3–1	0–1	

Source: Almanacco Illustrato del Calcio - La Storia 1898-2004, Panini Edizioni, Modena, September 2005 (in Italian)
Legend: Blue = home team win; Yellow = draw; Red = away team win.

== Attendances ==
#	Club	Average
1	Napoli	31,178
2	Brescia	16,712
3	Hellas	10,643
4	Padova	9,677
5	Cagliari	9,030
6	Foggia	8,206
7	Palermo	7,339
8	Varese	6,833
9	Lecco	6,667
10	Venezia	6,518
11	Parma	6,028
12	Triestina	5,240
13	Udinese	5,203
14	Cosenza	5,198
15	Alessandria	4,945
16	Prato	4,619
17	Pro Patria	4,322
18	Monza	3,974
19	Catanzaro	3,562
20	Potenza	3,283

== References and sources ==
- Almanacco Illustrato del Calcio - La Storia 1898-2004, Panini Edizioni, Modena, September 2005

Specific
