= Stadio Amsicora =

Multi-use stadium in Cagliari, Italy

Coordinates: 39°12′15″N 9°8′26″E

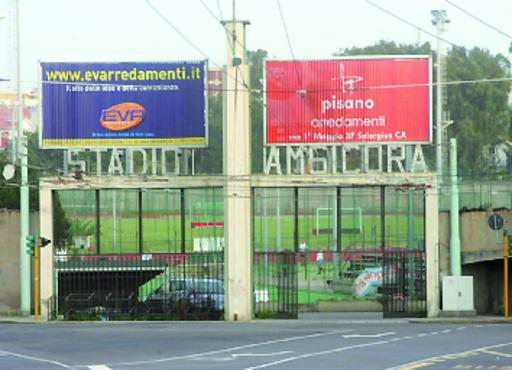
Stadio Amsicora

Stadio Amsicora is a multi-use stadium in Cagliari, Italy. It was used mostly for football matches and was the home of Cagliari Calcio. The stadium was able to hold 34,000 spectators at its height. Its capacity has since been downsized to 8,000 spectators. Cagliari Calcio moved to the Stadio Sant'Elia in 1970.
