= 1969–70 Serie A =

67th season of top-tier Italian football

Serie A
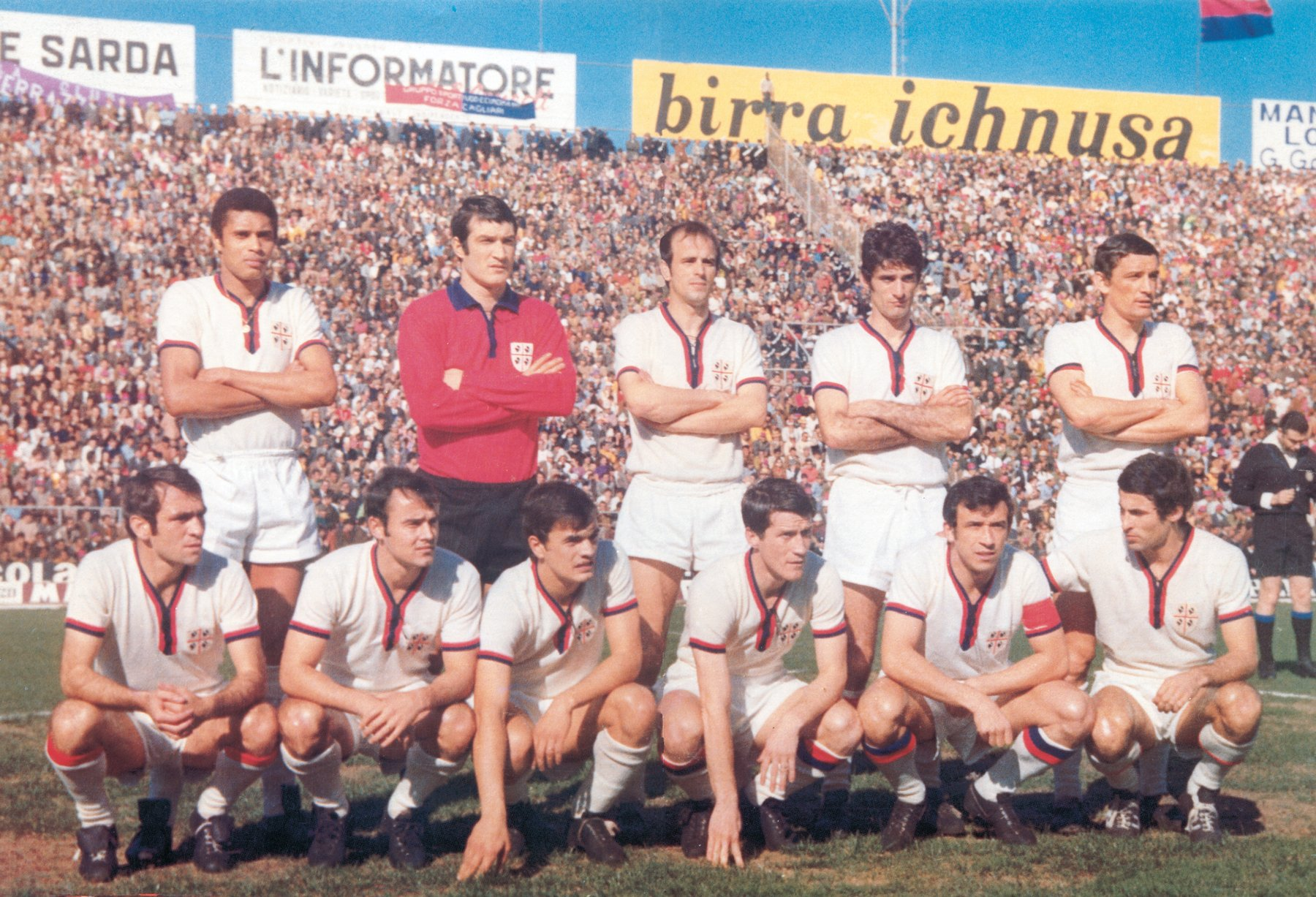
- 1969–70 Cagliari team
- Season: 1969–70
- Dates: 14 September 1969 – 26 April 1970
- Champions: Cagliari; 1st title
- Relegated: Brescia; Palermo; Bari
- European Cup: Cagliari
- Cup Winners' Cup: Bologna
- Inter-Cities Fairs Cup: Internazionale; Juventus; Fiorentina; Lazio
- Matches: 240
- Goals: 464 (1.93 per match)
- Top goalscorer: Gigi Riva (21 goals)

Serie A 1969-70 team distribution

The 1969–70 Serie A season was won by Cagliari.

== Teams ==
Lazio, Brescia and Bari had been promoted from Serie B.

== Final classification ==
Pos	Team	Pld	W	D	L	GF	GA	GD	Pts	Qualification or relegation
1	Cagliari (C)	30	17	11	2	42	11	+31	45	Qualification to European Cup
2	Internazionale	30	16	9	5	41	19	+22	41	Qualified to Inter-Cities Fairs Cup
3	Juventus	30	15	8	7	43	20	+23	38	Qualified to Inter-Cities Fairs Cup
4	Milan	30	13	10	7	38	24	+14	36	(Note: Milan not qualified to the ICFC consequently to Inter qualification.)
5	Fiorentina	30	15	6	9	40	33	+7	36	Qualified to Inter-Cities Fairs Cup
6	Napoli	30	10	11	9	24	21	+3	31	
7	Torino	30	11	8	11	20	31	−11	30	
8	Lazio	30	11	7	12	33	32	+1	29	Qualified to Inter-Cities Fairs Cup
8	Vicenza	30	11	7	12	32	31	+1	29	
10	Bologna	30	6	16	8	22	24	−2	28	Qualification to Cup Winners' Cup
11	Roma	30	8	12	10	27	36	−9	28	
12	Hellas Verona	30	8	10	12	26	30	−4	26	
13	Sampdoria	30	6	12	12	22	37	−15	24	
14	Brescia (R)	30	5	10	15	20	35	−15	20	Relegation to Serie B
15	Palermo (R)	30	5	10	15	23	45	−22	20	Relegation to Serie B
16	Bari (R)	30	5	9	16	11	35	−24	19	Relegation to Serie B

Source: Panini
(C) Champions; (R) Relegated

== Results ==
Home \ Away	BAR	BOL	BRE	CAG	FIO	INT	JUV	LRV	LAZ	MIL	NAP	PAL	ROM	SAM	TOR	HEL
Bari		0–2	2–0	0–0	1–1	0–1	2–1	0–0	0–0	0–5	0–0	1–0	1–0	0–0	0–1	0–2
Bologna	1–1		0–3	0–0	2–2	2–1	0–0	1–1	1–0	0–1	1–2	3–1	1–1	1–1	0–1	0–0
Brescia	0–0	1–1		0–2	1–2	1–1	0–1	1–1	0–0	1–4	1–2	4–2	0–1	0–0	0–1	0–0
Cagliari	2–0	1–0	4–0		0–0	1–1	1–1	2–1	1–0	1–1	2–0	2–0	1–0	4–0	2–0	1–0
Fiorentina	3–0	0–1	0–1	0–1		2–0	2–0	2–1	2–0	4–2	1–2	3–1	2–2	1–0	0–0	1–0
Internazionale	1–0	1–0	3–1	1–0	3–0		0–0	0–0	3–0	0–0	1–0	2–0	2–0	3–2	2–0	0–0
Juventus	1–0	1–1	1–0	2–2	2–0	2–1		4–0	2–1	3–0	0–0	4–1	1–1	2–0	1–2	3–0
Vicenza	2–0	1–1	0–1	1–2	1–2	1–1	1–0		2–1	1–0	3–2	1–1	3–0	2–1	1–0	3–0
Lazio	4–1	1–0	1–0	0–2	5–1	3–1	2–0	1–0		1–0	0–2	4–0	1–1	1–0	1–1	0–1
Milan	1–0	0–0	1–1	0–0	4–2	0–1	0–2	1–0	3–0		1–0	1–0	2–3	0–0	3–0	2–0
Napoli	1–0	0–0	0–0	0–2	0–1	0–0	1–0	1–0	1–1	1–1		0–0	0–0	0–2	4–0	2–1
Palermo	0–0	1–0	1–3	1–0	1–1	1–2	1–3	1–3	1–1	0–0	0–0		2–2	3–0	1–0	1–0
Roma	1–0	1–2	1–0	1–1	0–1	2–1	0–3	1–0	2–1	0–1	2–1	1–1		3–3	0–0	1–1
Sampdoria	1–0	0–0	2–0	0–0	1–3	0–5	0–0	0–1	0–2	1–1	0–0	1–0	2–0		1–1	2–1
Torino	0–1	1–1	1–0	0–4	1–0	0–0	0–3	1–0	3–0	0–1	0–2	1–1	0–0	2–1		2–1
Hellas Verona	4–1	0–0	0–0	1–1	0–1	1–3	1–0	3–1	1–1	2–2	1–0	2–0	2–0	1–1	0–1	

Source: Almanacco Illustrato del Calcio - La Storia 1898-2004, Panini Edizioni, Modena, September 2005 (in Italian)
Legend: Blue = home team win; Yellow = draw; Red = away team win.

== Top goalscorers ==
Rank	Player	Club	Goals
1	(Italy) Gigi Riva	Cagliari	21
2	(Italy) Alessandro Vitali	Vicenza	17
3	(Italy) Pietro Anastasi	Juventus	15
4	(Italy) Roberto Boninsegna	Internazionale	13
5	(Italy) Giorgio Chinaglia	Lazio	12
5	(Italy) Luciano Chiarugi	Fiorentina	12
5	(Italy) Pierino Prati	Milan	12
8	(Italy) Mario Bertini	Internazionale	9
9	(Italy) Angelo Domenghini	Cagliari	8
9	(Italy) Gianni Rivera	Milan	8
9	(Brazil) (Italy) José Altafini	Napoli	8

== Attendances ==
#	Club	Average
1	Napoli	55,025
2	Roma	50,625
3	Milan	43,674
4	Internazionale	41,867
5	Juventus	37,366
6	Lazio	34,883
7	Fiorentina	34,549
8	Cagliari	25,051
9	Bari	24,630
10	Torino	23,813
11	Bologna	23,297
12	Hellas Verona	22,448
13	Sampdoria	18,029
14	Vicenza	15,975
15	Brescia	15,512
16	Palermo	15,393

== References and sources ==
- Almanacco Illustrato del Calcio - La Storia 1898-2004, Panini Edizioni, Modena, September 2005
