= 1965 Intercontinental Cup =

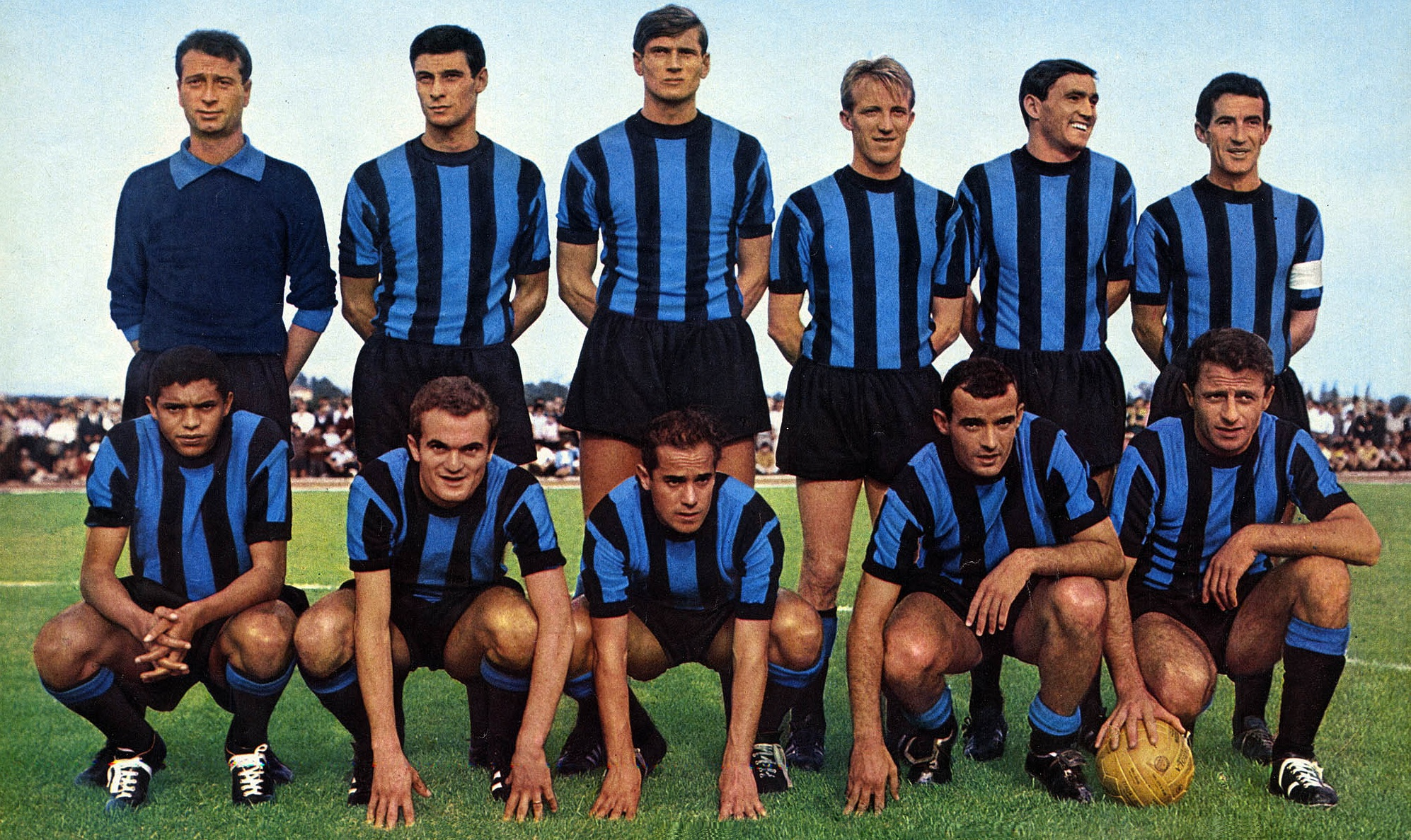
- Inter Milan, champions
- Event: Intercontinental Cup
Inter Milan	Independiente
(Italy)	(Argentina)
- Inter Milan won 3–1 on points

First leg
Inter Milan	Independiente
3	0
- Date: 8 September 1965
- Venue: San Siro, Milan
- Referee: Rudolf Kreitlein (West Germany)
- Attendance: 60,000

Second leg
Independiente	Inter Milan
0	0
- Date: 15 September 1965
- Venue: La Doble Visera, Avellaneda
- Referee: Arturo Yamasaki (Peru)
- Attendance: 55,000

The 1965 Intercontinental Cup was an association football tie held over two legs in September 1965 between the title holders of the 1964–65 European Cup Inter Milan and Independiente, winners of the 1965 Copa Libertadores, premier competitions in European and South American club football. This was a rematch of the contesters of the previous edition.

The first leg was held on 8 September 1965 at San Siro, home of Inter, who won the match 3–0, with goals from Joaquín Peiró and Sandro Mazzola. La Doble Visera hosted the return leg 7 days later on 15 September 1965, and ended in a goalless draw. Inter thus won the Intercontinental Cup for the second consecutive year.

== Qualified teams ==
Team	Qualification	Previous finals app.
(Italy) Inter Milan	1964–65 European Cup champion	1964
(Argentina) Independiente	1965 Copa Libertadores champion	1964

== Venues ==
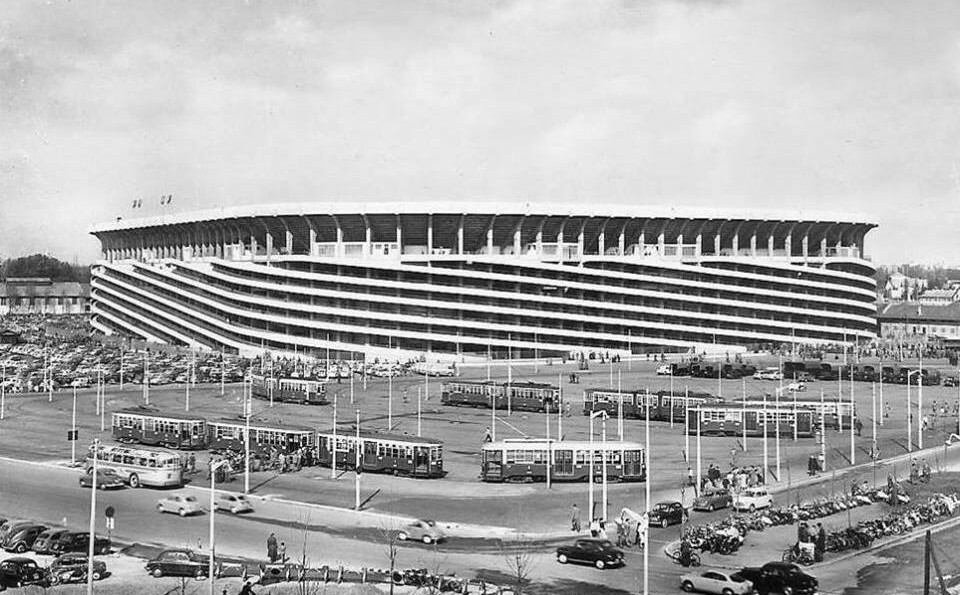
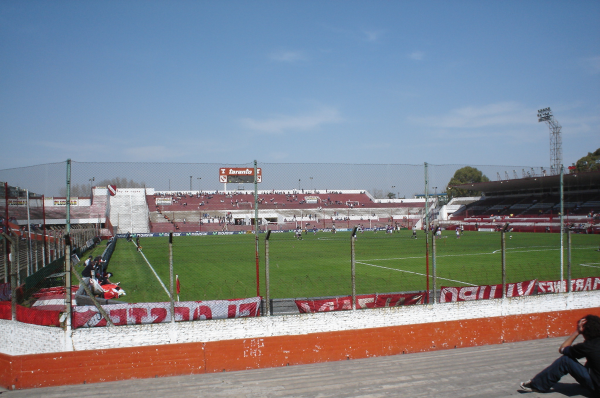
San Siro (left) and Independiente Stadium, venues for the series

== Match details ==
=== First leg ===
1965 Intercontinental Cup
8 September 1965
First leg

Inter Milan (Italy)	3–0	(Argentina) Independiente
Peiró 3'; Mazzola 22', 59'	Report

San Siro, Milan
Attendance: 60,000
Referee: Rudolf Kreitlein (West Germany)

Inter Milan	Independiente

GK	1	(Italy) Giuliano Sarti
DF	2	(Italy) Tarcisio Burgnich
DF	3	(Italy) Giacinto Facchetti (c)
DF	4	(Italy) Gianfranco Bedin
DF	5	(Italy) Aristide Guarneri
MF	6	(Italy) Armando Picchi
MF	7	(Brazil) Jair da Costa
MF	8	(Italy) Sandro Mazzola
FW	9	(Spain) Joaquín Peiró
FW	10	(Spain) Luis Suárez
FW	11	(Italy) Mario Corso
Manager:
(Argentina) Helenio Herrera

GK	1	(Argentina) Miguel Ángel Santoro
DF	2	(Argentina) Rubén Navarro
DF	3	(Uruguay) Ricardo Pavoni (c)
DF	4	(Argentina) David Acevedo
DF	5	(Argentina) Juan Carlos Guzmán
MF	6	(Argentina) Roberto Ferreiro
MF	7	(Argentina) Raúl Bernao
MF	8	(Argentina) Osvaldo Mura
FW	9	(Argentina) Raúl Savoy
FW	10	(Argentina) Mario Rodríguez
FW	11	(Argentina) Tomás Rolan
Manager:
(Argentina) Manuel Giúdice

=== Second leg ===
15 September 1965
Second leg

Independiente (Argentina)	0–0	(Italy) Inter Milan
	Report

Independiente Stadium, Avellaneda
Attendance: 55,185
Referee: Arturo Yamasaki (Peru)

Independiente	Inter Milan

GK	1	(Argentina) Miguel Ángel Santoro
DF	2	(Argentina) Rubén Navarro
DF	3	(Uruguay) Ricardo Pavoni (c)
DF	4	(Argentina) Roberto Ferreiro
DF	5	(Argentina) Tomás Barrios
MF	6	(Argentina) Juan Carlos Guzmán
MF	7	(Argentina) Raúl Bernao
MF	8	(Argentina) Osvaldo Mura
FW	9	(Argentina) Roque Avallay
FW	10	(Argentina) Miguel Mori
FW	11	(Argentina) Raúl Savoy
Manager:
(Argentina) Manuel Giúdice

GK	1	(Italy) Giuliano Sarti
DF	2	(Italy) Tarcisio Burgnich
DF	3	(Italy) Giacinto Facchetti (c)
DF	4	(Italy) Gianfranco Bedin
DF	5	(Italy) Aristide Guarneri
MF	6	(Italy) Armando Picchi
MF	7	(Brazil) Jair da Costa
MF	8	(Italy) Sandro Mazzola
FW	9	(Spain) Joaquín Peiró
FW	10	(Spain) Luis Suárez
FW	11	(Italy) Mario Corso
Manager:
(Argentina) Helenio Herrera

== See also ==
- 1964–65 European Cup
- 1965 Copa Libertadores
- Inter Milan in European football
