= Inter Milan in international football =

Italian club in international football

- Club: FC Internazionale Milano
- Seasons played: 60
- First entry: 1955–58 Inter-Cities Fairs Cup
- Latest entry: 2026–27 UEFA Champions League

Titles
- Champions League: 3: 1964; 1965; 2010
- Europa League: 3: 1991; 1994; 1998
- Intercontinental Cup: 2: 1964; 1965
- FIFA Club World Cup: 1: 2010

Football Club Internazionale Milano is an Italian association football club based in Milan, Lombardy. The club was formed on 9 March 1908 to allow the foreign players to play in Italy. Inter played its first competitive match on 10 January 1909 against their cross-town rivals Milan, in which they lost 3–2.

The club won its very first title in 1910 – the 1909–10 Italian Football Championship. Since then, the club has won further 19 league titles, along with nine Coppa Italia and eight Supercoppa Italiana. They have also been crowned champions of Europe on three occasions by winning two European Cups back-to-back in 1964 and 1965 and then another in 2010. The club experienced the most successful period in their history from 2006 to 2011, in which it won five successive league titles, equaling the all-time record at that time, by adding three Italian Cups, four Italian Supercups, one UEFA Champions League and one FIFA Club World Cup. During the 2009–10 season, Inter became the first and only Italian team to win the Treble and the second team to win five trophies in a calendar year.

== UEFA-organised seasonal competitions ==
=== European Cup / UEFA Champions League ===
Season	Round	Opposition	Home	Away	Aggregate
1963–64	Preliminary round	(England) Everton	1–0	0–0	1–0
1963–64	First round	(France) Monaco	1–0	3–1	4–1
1963–64	Quarter-finals	(Socialist Federal Republic of Yugoslavia) Partizan	2–1	2–0	4–1
1963–64	Semi-finals	(West Germany) Borussia Dortmund	2–0	2–2	4–2
1963–64	Final	(Spain) Real Madrid	3–1		
1964–65	First round	(Romania) Dinamo București	6–0	1–0	7–0
1964–65	Quarter-finals	(Scotland) Rangers	3–1	0–1	3–2
1964–65	Semi-finals	(England) Liverpool	3–0	1–3	4–3
1964–65	Final	(Portugal) Benfica	1–0		
1965–66	First round	(Romania) Dinamo București	2–0	1–2	3–2
1965–66	Quarter-finals	(Hungary) Ferencváros	4–0	1–1	5–1
1965–66	Semi-finals	(Spain) Real Madrid	1–1	0–1	1–2
1966–67	First round	(Soviet Union) Torpedo Moscow	1–0	0–0	1–0
1966–67	Second round	(Hungary) Vasas	2–1	2–0	4–1
1966–67	Quarter-finals	(Spain) Real Madrid	1–0	2–0	3–0
1966–67	Semi-finals	(Bulgaria) CSKA Sofia	1–1	1–1	3–2 (po 1–0)
1966–67	Final	(Scotland) Celtic	1–2		
1971–72	First round	(Greece) AEK Athens	4–1	2–3	6–4
1971–72	Second round	(West Germany) Borussia Mönchengladbach	4–2	0–0	4–2
1971–72	Quarter-finals	(Belgium) Standard Liège	1–0	1–2	2–2 (a)
1971–72	Semi-finals	(Scotland) Celtic	0–0	0–0	0–0 (5–4 p)
1971–72	Final	(Netherlands) Ajax	0–2		
1980–81	First round	(Romania) Universitatea Craiova	2–0	1–1	3–1
1980–81	Second round	(France) Nantes	1–1	2–1	3–2
1980–81	Quarter-finals	(Socialist Federal Republic of Yugoslavia) Red Star Belgrade	1–1	1–0	2–1
1980–81	Semi-finals	(Spain) Real Madrid	1–0	0–2	1–2
1989–90	First round	(Sweden) Malmö FF	1–1	0–1	1–2
1998–99	Qualifying round	(Latvia) Skonto	4–0	3–1	7–1
1998–99	Group stage	(Spain) Real Madrid	3–1	0–2	1st
1998–99	Group stage	(Austria) Sturm Graz	1–0	2–0	1st
1998–99	Group stage	(Russia) Spartak Moscow	2–1	1–1	1st
1998–99	Quarter-finals	(England) Manchester United	1–1	0–2	1–3
2000–01	Third qualifying round	(Sweden) Helsingborgs IF	0–0	0–1	0–1
2002–03	Third qualifying round	(Portugal) Sporting CP	2–0	0–0	2–0
2002–03	First Group stage	(Norway) Rosenborg	3–0	2–2	1st
2002–03	First Group stage	(Netherlands) Ajax	1–0	2–1	1st
2002–03	First Group stage	(France) Lyon	1–2	3–3	1st
2002–03	Second Group stage	(England) Newcastle United	2–2	4–1	2nd
2002–03	Second Group stage	(Germany) Bayer Leverkusen	3–2	2–0	2nd
2002–03	Second Group stage	(Spain) Barcelona	0–0	0–3	2nd
2002–03	Quarter-finals	(Spain) Valencia	1–0	1–2	2–2 (a)
2002–03	Semi-finals	(Italy) Milan	1–1	0–0	1–1 (a)
2003–04	Group stage	(England) Arsenal	1–5	3–0	3rd
2003–04	Group stage	(Ukraine) Dynamo Kyiv	2–1	1–1	3rd
2003–04	Group stage	(Russia) Lokomotiv Moscow	1–1	0–3	3rd
2004–05	Third qualifying round	(Switzerland) Basel	4–1	1–1	5–2
2004–05	Group stage	(Germany) Werder Bremen	2–0	1–1	1st
2004–05	Group stage	(Belgium) Anderlecht	3–0	3–1	1st
2004–05	Group stage	(Spain) Valencia	0–0	5–1	1st
2004–05	Round of 16	(Portugal) Porto	3–1	1–1	4–2
2004–05	Quarter-finals	(Italy) Milan	0–3 (f)	0–2	0–5
2005–06	Third qualifying round	(Ukraine) Shakhtar Donetsk	1–1	2–0	3–1
2005–06	Group stage	(Slovakia) Artmedia	4–0	1–0	1st
2005–06	Group stage	(Scotland) Rangers	1–0	1–1	1st
2005–06	Group stage	(Portugal) Porto	2–1	0–2	1st
2005–06	Round of 16	(Netherlands) Ajax	1–0	2–2	3–2
2005–06	Quarter-finals	(Spain) Villarreal	2–1	0–1	2–2 (a)
2006–07	Group stage	(Portugal) Sporting CP	1–0	0–1	2nd
2006–07	Group stage	(Germany) Bayern Munich	0–2	1–1	2nd
2006–07	Group stage	(Russia) Spartak Moscow	2–1	1–0	2nd
2006–07	Round of 16	(Spain) Valencia	2–2	0–0	2–2 (a)
2007–08	Group stage	(Turkey) Fenerbahçe	3–0	0–1	1st
2007–08	Group stage	(Netherlands) PSV Eindhoven	2–0	1–0	1st
2007–08	Group stage	(Russia) CSKA Moscow	4–2	2–1	1st
2007–08	Round of 16	(England) Liverpool	0–1	0–2	0–3
2008–09	Group stage	(Greece) Panathinaikos	0–1	2–0	2nd
2008–09	Group stage	(Germany) Werder Bremen	1–1	1–2	2nd
2008–09	Group stage	(Cyprus) Anorthosis Famagusta	1–0	3–3	2nd
2008–09	Round of 16	(England) Manchester United	0–0	0–2	0–2
2009–10	Group stage	(Spain) Barcelona	0–0	0–2	2nd
2009–10	Group stage	(Russia) Rubin Kazan	2–0	1–1	2nd
2009–10	Group stage	(Ukraine) Dynamo Kyiv	2–2	2–1	2nd
2009–10	Round of 16	(England) Chelsea	2–1	1–0	3–1
2009–10	Quarter-finals	(Russia) CSKA Moscow	1–0	1–0	2–0
2009–10	Semi-finals	(Spain) Barcelona	3–1	0–1	3–2
2009–10	Final	(Germany) Bayern Munich	2–0		
2010–11	Group stage	(Netherlands) Twente	1–0	2–2	2nd
2010–11	Group stage	(Germany) Werder Bremen	4–0	0–3	2nd
2010–11	Group stage	(England) Tottenham Hotspur	4–3	1–3	2nd
2010–11	Round of 16	(Germany) Bayern Munich	0–1	3–2	3–3 (a)
2010–11	Quarter-finals	(Germany) Schalke 04	2–5	1–2	3–7
2011–12	Group stage	(Turkey) Trabzonspor	0–1	1–1	1st
2011–12	Group stage	(Russia) CSKA Moscow	1–2	3–2	1st
2011–12	Group stage	(France) Lille	2–1	1–0	1st
2011–12	Round of 16	(France) Marseille	2–1	0–1	2–2 (a)
2018–19	Group stage	(Spain) Barcelona	1–1	0–2	3rd
2018–19	Group stage	(England) Tottenham Hotspur	2–1	0–1	3rd
2018–19	Group stage	(Netherlands) PSV Eindhoven	1–1	2–1	3rd
2019–20	Group stage	(Czech Republic) Slavia Prague	1–1	3–1	3rd
2019–20	Group stage	(Spain) Barcelona	1–2	1–2	3rd
2019–20	Group stage	(Germany) Borussia Dortmund	2–0	2–3	3rd
2020–21	Group stage	(Spain) Real Madrid	0–2	2–3	4th
2020–21	Group stage	(Ukraine) Shakhtar Donetsk	0–0	0–0	4th
2020–21	Group stage	(Germany) Borussia Mönchengladbach	2–2	3–2	4th
2021–22	Group stage	(Spain) Real Madrid	0–1	0–2	2nd
2021–22	Group stage	(Ukraine) Shakhtar Donetsk	2–0	0–0	2nd
2021–22	Group stage	(Moldova) Sheriff Tiraspol	3–1	3–1	2nd
2021–22	Round of 16	(England) Liverpool	0–2	1–0	1–2
2022–23	Group stage	(Germany) Bayern Munich	0–2	0–2	2nd
2022–23	Group stage	(Czech Republic) Viktoria Plzeň	4–0	2–0	2nd
2022–23	Group stage	(Spain) Barcelona	1–0	3–3	2nd
2022–23	Round of 16	(Portugal) Porto	1–0	0–0	1–0
2022–23	Quarter-finals	(Portugal) Benfica	3–3	2–0	5–3
2022–23	Semi-finals	(Italy) Milan	1–0	2–0	3–0
2022–23	Final	(England) Manchester City	0–1		
2023–24	Group stage	(Spain) Real Sociedad	0–0	1–1	2nd
2023–24	Group stage	(Portugal) Benfica	1–0	3–3	2nd
2023–24	Group stage	(Austria) Red Bull Salzburg	2–1	1–0	2nd
2023–24	Round of 16	(Spain) Atlético Madrid	1–0	1–2 (a.e.t.)	2–2 (2–3 p)
2024–25	League phase	(England) Manchester City	—N/a	0–0	4th
2024–25	League phase	(Serbia) Red Star Belgrade	4–0	—N/a	4th
2024–25	League phase	(Switzerland) Young Boys	—N/a	1–0	4th
2024–25	League phase	(England) Arsenal	1–0	—N/a	4th
2024–25	League phase	(Germany) RB Leipzig	1–0	—N/a	4th
2024–25	League phase	(Germany) Bayer Leverkusen	—N/a	0–1	4th
2024–25	League phase	(Czech Republic) Sparta Prague	—N/a	1–0	4th
2024–25	League phase	(France) Monaco	3–0	—N/a	4th
2024–25	Round of 16	(Netherlands) Feyenoord	2–1	2–0	4–1
2024–25	Quarter-finals	(Germany) Bayern Munich	2–2	2–1	4–3
2024–25	Semi-finals	(Spain) Barcelona	4–3 (a.e.t.)	3–3	7–6
2024–25	Final	(France) Paris Saint-Germain	0–5		
2025–26	League phase	(Netherlands) Ajax	—N/a	2–0	10th
2025–26	League phase	(Czech Republic) Slavia Prague	3–0	—N/a	10th
2025–26	League phase	(Belgium) Union Saint-Gilloise	—N/a	4–0	10th
2025–26	League phase	(Kazakhstan) Kairat	2–1	—N/a	10th
2025–26	League phase	(Spain) Atlético Madrid	—N/a	1–2	10th
2025–26	League phase	(England) Liverpool	0–1	—N/a	10th
2025–26	League phase	(England) Arsenal	1–3	—N/a	10th
2025–26	League phase	(Germany) Borussia Dortmund	—N/a	2–0	10th
2025–26	Knockout phase play-offs	(Norway) Bodø/Glimt	1–2	1–3	2–5
2026–27	League phase	(Spain) Real Madrid	—N/a	1–2	
2026–27	League phase	(Belgium) Club Brugge	3–4	—N/a	
2026–27	League phase	(Ukraine) Shakhtar Donetsk	1–0	—N/a	
2026–27	League phase	(Netherlands) Feyenoord	—N/a		
2026–27	League phase	(Germany) VfB Stuttgart		—N/a	
2026–27	League phase	(Germany) Borussia Dortmund	—N/a		
2026–27	League phase	(England) Liverpool		—N/a	
2026–27	League phase	(Slovakia) Slovan Bratislava	—N/a		

=== UEFA Cup / UEFA Europa League ===
Season	Round	Opposition	Home	Away	Aggregate
1972–73	First round	(Malta) Valletta	6–1	1–0	7–1
1972–73	Second round	(Sweden) IFK Norrköping	2–2	2–0	4–2
1972–73	Third round	(Portugal) Vitória de Setúbal	1–0	0–2	1–2
1973–74	First round	(Austria) Admira Wacker	2–1 (a.e.t.)	0–1	2–2 (a)
1974–75	First round	(Bulgaria) Etar	3–0	0–0	3–0
1974–75	Second round	(Netherlands) FC Amsterdam	1–2	0–0	1–2
1976–77	First round	(Hungary) Budapest Honvéd	0–1	1–1	1–2
1977–78	First round	(Soviet Union) Dinamo Tbilisi	0–1	0–0	0–1
1979–80	First round	(Spain) Real Sociedad	3–0	0–2	3–2
1979–80	Second round	(West Germany) Borussia Mönchengladbach	2–3 (a.e.t.)	1–1	3–4
1981–82	First round	(Turkey) Adanaspor	4–1	3–1	7–2
1981–82	Second round	(Romania) Dinamo București	1–1	2–3 (a.e.t.)	3–4
1983–84	First round	(Turkey) Trabzonspor	2–0	0–1	2–1
1983–84	Second round	(Netherlands) Groningen	5–1	0–2	5–3
1983–84	Third round	Austria Wien	1–1	1–2	2–3
1984–85	First round	(Romania) Sportul Studențesc	2–0	0–1	2–1
1984–85	Second round	(Scotland) Rangers	3–0	1–3	4–3
1984–85	Third round	(West Germany) Hamburger SV	1–0	1–2	2–2 (a)
1984–85	Quarter-finals	(West Germany) 1. FC Köln	1–0	3–1	4–1
1984–85	Semi-finals	(Spain) Real Madrid	2–0	0–3	2–3
1985–86	First round	(Switzerland) St. Gallen	5–1	0–0	5–1
1985–86	Second round	(Austria) LASK	4–0	0–1	4–1
1985–86	Third round	(Poland) Legia Warsaw	0–0	1–0 (a.e.t.)	1–0
1985–86	Quarter-finals	(France) Nantes	3–0	3–3	6–3
1985–86	Semi-finals	(Spain) Real Madrid	3–1	1–5 (a.e.t.)	4–6
1986–87	First round	(Greece) AEK Athens	2–0	1–0	3–0
1986–87	Second round	(Poland) Legia Warsaw	1–0	2–3	3–3 (a)
1986–87	Third round	(Czechoslovakia) Dukla Prague	0–0	1–0	1–0
1986–87	Quarter-finals	(Sweden) Göteborg	1–1	0–0	1–1 (a)
1987–88	First round	(Turkey) Beşiktaş	3–1	0–0	3–1
1987–88	Second round	(Finland) TPS	0–1	2–0	2–1
1987–88	Third round	(Spain) Espanyol	1–1	0–1	1–2
1988–89	First round	(Sweden) IK Brage	2–1	2–1	4–2
1988–89	Second round	(Sweden) Malmö FF	1–1	1–0	2–1
1988–89	Third round	(West Germany) Bayern Munich	1–3	2–0	3–3 (a)
1990–91	First round	(Austria) Rapid Wien	3–1 (a.e.t.)	1–2	4–3
1990–91	Second round	(England) Aston Villa	3–0	0–2	3–2
1990–91	Third round	(Socialist Federal Republic of Yugoslavia) Partizan	3–0	1–1	4–1
1990–91	Quarter-finals	(Italy) Atalanta	2–0	0–0	2–0
1990–91	Semi-finals	(Portugal) Sporting CP	2–0	0–0	2–0
1990–91	Final	(Italy) Roma	2–0	0–1	2–1
1991–92	First round	(Portugal) Boavista	0–0	1–2	1–2
1993–94	First round	(Romania) Rapid București	3–1	2–0	5–1
1993–94	Second round	(Cyprus) Apollon Limassol	1–0	3–3	4–3
1993–94	Third round	(England) Norwich City	1–0	1–0	2–0
1993–94	Quarter-finals	(Germany) Borussia Dortmund	1–2	3–1	4–3
1993–94	Semi-finals	(Italy) Cagliari	3–0	2–3	5–3
1993–94	Final	(Austria) Casino Salzburg	1–0	1–0	2–0
1994–95	First round	(England) Aston Villa	1–0	0–1	1–1, 3–4 (p)
1995–96	First round	(Switzerland) Lugano	0–1	1–1	1–2
1996–97	First round	(France) Guingamp	1–1	3–0	4–1
1996–97	Second round	(Austria) Grazer AK	1–0	0–1	1–1, 5–3 (p)
1996–97	Third round	(Portugal) Boavista	5–1	2–0	7–1
1996–97	Quarter-finals	(Belgium) Anderlecht	2–1	1–1	3–2
1996–97	Semi-finals	(France) Monaco	3–1	0–1	3–2
1996–97	Final	(Germany) Schalke 04	1–0	0–1	1–1, 1–4 (p)
1997–98	First round	(Switzerland) Neuchâtel Xamax	2–0	2–0	4–0
1997–98	Second round	(France) Lyon	1–2	3–1	4–3
1997–98	Third round	(France) Strasbourg	3–0	0–2	3–2
1997–98	Quarter-finals	(Germany) Schalke 04	1–0	1–1 (a.e.t.)	2–1
1997–98	Semi-finals	(Russia) Spartak Moscow	2–1	2–1	4–2
1997–98	Final	(Italy) Lazio	3–0		
2000–01	First round	(Poland) Ruch Chorzów	4–1	3–0	7–1
2000–01	Second round	(Netherlands) Vitesse	0–0	1–1	1–1 (a)
2000–01	Third round	(Germany) Hertha BSC	2–1	0–0	2–1
2000–01	Fourth round	(Spain) Alavés	0–2	3–3	3–5
2001–02	First round	(Romania) Brașov	3–0	3–0	6–0
2001–02	Second round	(Poland) Wisła Kraków	2–0	0–1	2–1
2001–02	Third round	(England) Ipswich Town	4–1	0–1	4–2
2001–02	Fourth round	(Greece) AEK Athens	3–1	2–2	5–3
2001–02	Quarter-finals	(Spain) Valencia	1–1	1–0	2–1
2001–02	Semi-finals	(Netherlands) Feyenoord	0–1	2–2	2–3
2003–04	Round of 32	(France) Sochaux	0–0	2–2	2–2 (a)
2003–04	Round of 16	(Portugal) Benfica	4–3	0–0	4–3
2003–04	Quarter-finals	(France) Marseille	0–1	0–1	0–2
2012–13	Third qualifying round	(Croatia) Hajduk Split	0–2	3–0	3–2
2012–13	Play-off round	(Romania) Vaslui	2–2	2–0	4–2
2012–13	Group stage	(Russia) Rubin Kazan	2–2	0–3	2nd
2012–13	Group stage	(Azerbaijan) Neftçi	2–2	3–1	2nd
2012–13	Group stage	(Serbia) Partizan	1–0	3–1	2nd
2012–13	Round of 32	(Romania) CFR Cluj	2–0	3–0	5–0
2012–13	Round of 16	(England) Tottenham Hotspur	4–1 (a.e.t.)	0–3	4–4 (a)
2014–15	Play-off round	(Iceland) Stjarnan	6–0	3–0	9–0
2014–15	Group stage	(Ukraine) Dnipro Dnipropetrovsk	2–1	1–0	1st
2014–15	Group stage	(Azerbaijan) Qarabağ	2–0	0–0	1st
2014–15	Group stage	(France) Saint-Étienne	0–0	1–1	1st
2014–15	Round of 32	(Scotland) Celtic	1–0	3–3	4–3
2014–15	Round of 16	(Germany) VfL Wolfsburg	1–2	1–3	2–5
2016–17	Group stage	(Israel) Hapoel Be'er Sheva	0–2	2–3	4th
2016–17	Group stage	(Czech Republic) Sparta Prague	2–1	1–3	4th
2016–17	Group stage	(England) Southampton	1–0	1–2	4th
2018–19	Round of 32	(Austria) Rapid Wien	4–0	1–0	5–0
2018–19	Round of 16	(Germany) Eintracht Frankfurt	0–1	0–0	0–1
2019–20	Round of 32	(Bulgaria) Ludogorets Razgrad	2–1	2–0	4–1
2019–20	Round of 16	(Spain) Getafe	2–0		
2019–20	Quarter-finals	(Germany) Bayer Leverkusen	2–1		
2019–20	Semi-finals	(Ukraine) Shakhtar Donetsk	5–0		
2019–20	Final	(Spain) Sevilla	2–3		

=== European Cup Winners' Cup ===
Season	Round	Opposition	Home	Away	Aggregate
1978–79	First round	(Malta) Floriana	5–0	3–1	8–1
1978–79	Second round	(Norway) Bodø/Glimt	5–0	2–1	7–1
1978–79	Quarter-finals	(Belgium) Beveren	0–0	0–1	0–1
1982–83	First round	(Czechoslovakia) Slovan Bratislava	2–0	1–2	3–2
1982–83	Second round	(Netherlands) AZ	2–0	0–1	2–1
1982–83	Quarter-finals	(Spain) Real Madrid	1–1	1–2	2–3

=== UEFA Super Cup ===
Season	Round	Opposition	Score
2010	Final	(Spain) Atlético Madrid	0–2

== UEFA club coefficient ranking ==
=== Current ranking ===
As of 2 June 2025

Rank	Team	Points
4	(England) Liverpool	125.500
5	(France) Paris Saint-Germain	118.500
6	(Italy) Inter Milan	116.250
7	(England) Chelsea	109.000
8	(Germany) Borussia Dortmund	106.750

=== Ranking since 2004 ===
As of June 2026

Season	Ranking	Movement	Points	Change
2025–26	5	▲ +1	127.000	▲ +10.750
2024–25	6	▲ +1	116.250	▲ +15.250
2023–24	7	▲ +4	101.000	▲ +5.000
2022–23	11	▲ +12	96.000	▲ +29.000
2021–22	23	▲ +3	67.000	▲ +14.000
2020–21	26	▲ +7	53.000	▲ +9.000
2019–20	33	▲ +13	44.000	+13.000
2018–19	46	▲ +37	31.000	▲ +15.000
2017–18	83	▼ –38	16.000	▼ –14.000
2016–17	45	▼ –14	30.000	▼ –14.000
2015–16	31	▼ –7	44.000	▼ –19.000
2014–15	24	▼ –11	63.000	▼ –19.000
2013–14	13	▼ –6	82.000	▼ –11.000
2012–13	7	0	93.000	0.000
2011–12	7	▲ +2	93.000	▲ +5.000
2010–11	9	▼ –1	88.000	0.000
2009–10	8	▲ +3	88.000	▲ +13.000
2008–09	11	▼ –2	75.000	▼ –2.000
2007–08	9	▼ –5	77.000	▼ –9.000
2006–07	4	0	86.000	▼ –4.000
2005–06	4	▲ +3	90.000	▲ +9.000
2004–05	7	0	81.000	0.000

== FIFA competitions ==
=== Intercontinental Cup and FIFA Club World Cup ===
Season	Round	Opposition	Home	Away	Aggregate
1964	Final	(Argentina) Independiente	2–0	0–1	3–1 (po 1–0)
1965	Final	(Argentina) Independiente	3–0	0–0	3–0
2010	Semi-finals	(South Korea) Seongnam Ilhwa Chunma	3–0		
2010	Final	(Democratic Republic of the Congo) TP Mazembe	3–0		
2025	Group stage	(Mexico) Monterrey	1–1		1st
2025	Group stage	(Japan) Urawa Red Diamonds	2–1		1st
2025	Group stage	(Argentina) River Plate	2–0		1st
2025	Round of 16	(Brazil) Fluminense	0–2		

== FIFA-only recognized seasonal competitions ==
=== Inter-Cities Fairs Cup ===
Season	Round	Opposition	Home	Away	Aggregate
1955–58	Group B	(England) Birmingham City	0–0	1–2	2nd
1955–58	Group B	(Socialist Federal Republic of Yugoslavia) Zagreb XI	4–0	1–0	2nd
1958–60	First round	(France) Lyon	7–0	1–1	8–1
1958–60	Quarter-finals	(Spain) Barcelona	2–4	0–4	2–8
1960–61	First round	(West Germany) Hannover 96	8–2	6–1	14–3
1960–61	Quarter-finals	(Socialist Federal Republic of Yugoslavia) Belgrade XI	5–0	0–1	5–1
1960–61	Semi-finals	(England) Birmingham City	1–2	1–2	2–4
1961–62	First round	(West Germany) 1. FC Köln	2–0	2–4	9–7 (po 5–3)
1961–62	Second round	(Scotland) Heart of Midlothian	4–0	1–0	5–0
1961–62	Quarter-finals	(Spain) Valencia	3–3	0–2	3–5
1969–70	First round	(Czechoslovakia) Sparta Prague	3–0	1–0	4–0
1969–70	Second round	(East Germany) Hansa Rostock	3–0	1–2	4–2
1969–70	Third round	(Spain) Barcelona	1–1	2–1	3–2
1969–70	Quarter-finals	(West Germany) Hertha BSC	2–0	0–1	2–1
1969–70	Semi-finals	(Belgium) Anderlecht	0–2	1–0	1–2
1970–71	First round	(England) Newcastle United	1–1	0–2	1–3

== Overall record ==
Only official matches include UEFA Champions League (formerly European Cup), UEFA Europa League (formerly UEFA Cup), UEFA Super Cup, UEFA Cup Winners' Cup, Inter-Cities Fairs Cup, Intercontinental Cup, and FIFA Club World Cup matches.

As of 21 October 2026

Competition	Pld	W	D	L	GF	GA	GD	Win%
European Cup / UEFA Champions League	241	118	60	63	348	242	+106	48.96
UEFA Cup / UEFA Europa League	191	96	44	51	298	174	+124	50.26
UEFA Cup Winners' Cup	12	6	2	4	22	9	+13	50.00
UEFA Super Cup	1	0	0	1	0	2	−2	0.00
Inter-Cities Fairs Cup	33	16	5	12	69	41	+28	48.48
Intercontinental Cup	5	3	1	1	6	1	+5	60.00
FIFA Club World Cup	6	4	1	1	11	4	+7	66.67
Total	489	243	113	133	754	473	+281	49.69

=== By club ===
As of 21 October 2026

Team	Country	Matches	Wins	Win %	Draws	Draw %	Losses	Loss %	For	Against	For & against ratio
Adanaspor	(Turkey)	2	2	100%	0	0%	0	0%	7	2	3.5
Admira Wacker	(Austria)	2	1	50%	0	0%	1	50%	2	2	1
AEK Athens	(Greece)	6	4	66.67%	1	16.67%	1	16.67%	14	7	2
Ajax	(Netherlands)	6	4	66.66%	1	16.67%	1	16.67%	8	5	1.6
Alavés	(Spain)	2	0	0%	1	50%	1	50%	3	5	0.6
Amsterdam	(Netherlands)	2	0	0%	1	50%	1	50%	1	2	0.5
Anderlecht	(Belgium)	6	4	66.67%	1	16.67%	1	16.67%	10	5	2
Anorthosis Famagusta	(Cyprus)	2	1	50%	1	50%	0	0%	4	3	1.33
Apollon Limassol	(Cyprus)	2	1	50%	1	50%	0	0%	4	3	1.33
Arsenal	(England)	4	2	50%	0	0%	2	50%	6	8	0.75
Aston Villa	(England)	4	2	50%	0	0%	2	50%	4	3	1.33
Atalanta	(Italy)	2	1	50%	1	50%	0	0%	2	0	Inf.
Atlético Madrid	(Spain)	4	1	25%	0	0%	3	75%	3	6	0.5
Austria Wien	(Austria)	2	0	0%	1	50%	1	50%	2	3	0.67
AZ	(Netherlands)	2	1	50%	0	0%	1	50%	2	1	2
Barcelona	(Spain)	18	4	22.22%	6	33.33%	8	44.44%	22	33	0.67
Basel	(Switzerland)	2	1	50%	1	50%	0	0%	5	2	2.5
Bayer Leverkusen	(Germany)	4	3	75%	0	0%	1	25%	7	4	1.75
Bayern Munich	(Germany)	11	4	36.36%	2	18.18%	5	45.46%	13	16	0.81
Belgrade XI	(Serbia) (Socialist Federal Republic of Yugoslavia)	2	1	50%	0	0%	1	50%	5	1	5
Benfica	(Portugal)	7	4	57.14%	3	42.86%	0	0%	14	9	1.56
Beşiktaş	(Turkey)	2	1	50%	1	50%	0	0%	3	1	3
Beveren	(Belgium)	2	0	0%	1	50%	1	50%	0	1	0
Birmingham City	(England)	4	0	0%	1	25%	3	75%	3	6	0.5
Boavista	(Portugal)	4	2	50%	1	25%	1	25%	8	3	2.67
Bodø/Glimt	(Norway)	4	2	50%	0	0%	2	50%	9	6	1.5
Borussia Dortmund	(Germany)	7	4	57.14%	1	14.29%	2	28.57%	14	8	1.75
Borussia Mönchengladbach	(Germany)	6	2	25%	3	50%	1	25%	12	10	1.2
Brage	(Sweden)	2	2	100%	0	0%	0	0%	4	2	2
Brașov	(Romania)	2	2	100%	0	0%	0	0%	6	0	Inf.
Budapest Honvéd	(Hungary)	2	0	0%	1	50%	1	50%	1	2	0.5
Cagliari	(Italy)	2	1	50%	0	0%	1	50%	5	3	1.67
Celtic	(Scotland)	5	1	20%	3	60%	1	20%	5	5	1
CFR Cluj	(Romania)	2	2	100%	0	0%	0	0%	5	0	Inf.
Chelsea	(England)	2	2	100%	0	0%	0	0%	3	1	3
Club Brugge	(Belgium)	1	0	0%	0	0%	1	100%	3	4	0.75
CSKA Moscow	(Russia)	6	5	83.33%	0	0%	1	16.67%	12	7	1.71
CSKA Sofia	(Bulgaria)	3	1	33.33%	2	66.67%	0	0%	3	2	1.5
Dinamo București	(Romania)	6	3	50%	1	16.67%	2	33.33%	13	6	2.17
Dinamo Tbilisi	(Georgia (country)) (Soviet Union)	2	0	0%	1	50%	1	50%	0	1	0
Dnipro Dnipropetrovsk	(Ukraine)	2	2	100%	0	0%	0	0%	3	1	3
Dukla Prague	(Czech Republic)	2	1	50%	1	50%	0	0%	1	0	Inf.
Dynamo Kyiv	(Ukraine)	4	2	50%	2	50%	0	0%	7	5	1.4
Eintracht Frankfurt	(Germany)	2	0	0%	1	50%	1	50%	0	1	0
Espanyol	(Spain)	2	0	0%	1	50%	1	50%	1	2	0.5
Etar	(Bulgaria)	2	1	50%	1	50%	0	0%	3	0	Inf.
Everton	(England)	2	1	50%	1	50%	0	0%	1	0	Inf.
Fenerbahçe	(Turkey)	2	1	50%	0	0%	1	50%	3	1	3
Ferencváros	(Hungary)	2	1	50%	1	50%	0	0%	5	1	5
Feyenoord	(Netherlands)	4	2	50.00%	1	25.00%	1	25.00%	6	4	1.5
Floriana	(Malta)	2	2	100%	0	0%	0	0%	8	1	8
Fluminense	(Brazil)	1	0	0%	0	0%	1	100%	0	2	0
Getafe	(Spain)	1	1	100%	0	0%	0	0%	2	0	Inf.
IFK Göteborg	(Sweden)	2	0	0%	2	100%	0	0%	1	1	1
Grazer AK	(Austria)	2	1	50%	0	0%	1	50%	1	1	1
Groningen	(Netherlands)	2	1	50%	0	0%	1	50%	5	3	1.67
Guingamp	(France)	2	1	50%	1	50%	0	0%	4	1	4
Hajduk Split	(Croatia)	2	1	50%	0	0%	1	50%	3	2	1.5
Hamburger SV	(Germany)	2	1	50%	0	0%	1	50%	2	2	1
Hannover 96	(Germany)	2	2	100%	0	0%	0	0%	14	3	4.67
Hansa Rostock	(Germany) (East Germany)	2	1	50%	0	0%	1	50%	4	2	2
Hapoel Be'er Sheva	(Israel)	2	0	0%	0	0%	2	100%	2	5	0.4
Heart of Midlothian	(Scotland)	2	2	100%	0	0%	0	0%	5	0	Inf.
Helsingborgs IF	(Sweden)	2	0	0%	1	50%	1	50%	0	1	0
Hertha BSC	(Germany)	4	2	50%	1	25%	1	25%	4	2	2
Independiente	(Argentina)	5	3	60%	1	20%	1	20%	6	1	6
Ipswich Town	(England)	2	1	50%	0	0%	1	50%	4	2	2
Kairat	(Kazakhstan)	1	1	100%	0	0%	0	0%	2	1	2
1. FC Köln	(Germany)	5	4	80%	0	0%	1	20%	13	8	1.63
LASK	(Austria)	2	1	50%	0	0%	1	50%	4	1	4
Lazio	(Italy)	1	1	100%	0	0%	0	0%	3	0	Inf.
Legia Warsaw	(Poland)	4	2	50%	1	25%	1	25%	4	3	1.33
Lille	(France)	2	2	100%	0	0%	0	0%	3	1	3
Liverpool	(England)	7	2	28.57%	0	0%	5	71.43%	5	9	0.56
Lokomotiv Moscow	(Russia)	2	0	0%	1	50%	1	50%	1	4	0.25
Ludogorets Razgrad	(Bulgaria)	2	2	100%	0	0%	0	0%	4	1	4
Lugano	(Switzerland)	2	0	0%	1	50%	1	50%	1	2	0.5
Lyon	(France)	6	2	33.33%	2	33.33%	2	33.33%	16	9	1.78
Malmö FF	(Sweden)	4	1	25%	2	50%	1	25%	3	3	1
Manchester City	(England)	2	0	0%	1	50%	1	50%	0	1	0
Manchester United	(England)	4	0	0%	2	50%	2	50%	1	5	0.2
Marseille	(France)	4	1	25%	0	0%	3	75%	2	4	0.5
TP Mazembe	(Democratic Republic of the Congo)	1	1	100%	0	0%	0	0%	3	0	Inf.
Milan	(Italy)	6	2	33%	2	33%	2	33%	3	4	0.75
Monaco	(France)	5	4	80%	0	0%	1	20%	10	3	3.33
Monterrey	(Mexico)	1	0	0%	1	100%	0	0%	1	1	1
Nantes	(France)	4	2	50%	2	50%	0	0%	9	5	1.8
Neftçi	(Azerbaijan)	2	1	50%	1	50%	0	0%	5	3	1.67
Neuchâtel Xamax	(Switzerland)	2	2	100%	0	0%	0	0%	4	0	Inf.
Newcastle United	(England)	4	1	25%	2	50%	1	25%	7	6	1.17
IFK Norrköping	(Sweden)	2	1	50%	1	50%	0	0%	4	2	2
Norwich City	(England)	2	2	100%	0	0%	0	0%	2	0	Inf.
Panathinaikos	(Greece)	2	1	50%	0	0%	1	50%	2	1	2
Paris Saint-Germain	(France)	1	0	0%	0	0%	1	100%	0	5	0
Partizan	(Serbia) (Socialist Federal Republic of Yugoslavia)	6	5	83.33%	1	16.67%	0	0%	12	3	4
Petržalka	(Slovakia)	2	2	100%	0	0%	0	0%	5	0	Inf.
Porto	(Portugal)	6	3	50%	2	33.33%	1	16.66%	7	5	1.4
PSV Eindhoven	(Netherlands)	4	3	75%	1	25%	0	0%	6	2	3
Qarabağ	(Azerbaijan)	2	1	50%	1	50%	0	0%	2	0	Inf.
Rangers	(Scotland)	6	3	50%	1	16.67%	2	33.33%	9	6	1.5
Rapid București	(Romania)	2	2	100%	0	0%	0	0%	5	1	5
Rapid Wien	(Austria)	4	3	75%	0	0%	1	25%	9	3	3
RB Leipzig	(Germany)	1	1	100%	0	0%	0	0%	1	0	Inf.
Real Madrid	(Spain)	20	7	35%	2	10%	11	55%	22	30	0.73
Real Sociedad	(Spain)	4	1	25%	2	50%	1	25%	4	3	1.33
Red Bull Salzburg	(Austria)	4	4	100%	0	0%	0	0%	5	1	5
Red Star Belgrade	(Serbia) (Socialist Federal Republic of Yugoslavia)	3	2	67%	1	33%	0	0%	6	1	6
River Plate	(Argentina)	1	1	100%	0	0%	0	0%	2	0	Inf.
Roma	(Italy)	2	1	50%	0	0%	1	50%	2	1	2
Rosenborg	(Norway)	2	1	50%	1	50%	0	0%	5	2	2.5
Rubin Kazan	(Russia)	4	1	25%	2	50%	1	25%	5	6	0.83
Ruch Chorzów	(Poland)	2	2	100%	0	0%	0	0%	7	1	7
Saint-Étienne	(France)	2	0	0%	2	100%	0	0%	1	1	1
Schalke 04	(Germany)	6	2	33.33%	1	16.67%	3	50%	6	9	0.67
Seongnam Ilhwa Chunma	(South Korea)	1	1	100%	0	0%	0	0%	3	0	Inf.
Sevilla	(Spain)	1	0	0%	0	0%	1	100%	2	3	0.66
Shakhtar Donetsk	(Ukraine)	8	4	50%	4	50%	0	0%	11	1	11
Sheriff Tiraspol	(Moldova)	2	2	100%	0	0%	0	0%	6	2	3
Skonto	(Latvia)	2	2	100%	0	0%	0	0%	7	1	7
Slavia Prague	(Czech Republic)	3	2	66.67%	1	33.33%	0	0%	7	2	3.5
Slovan Bratislava	(Slovakia) (Czechoslovakia)	2	1	50%	0	0%	1	50%	3	2	1.5
Sochaux	(France)	2	0	0%	2	100%	0	0%	2	2	1
Southampton	(England)	2	1	50%	0	0%	1	50%	2	2	1
Sparta Prague	(Czech Republic)	5	4	80%	0	0%	1	20%	8	4	2
Spartak Moscow	(Russia)	6	5	83.33%	1	16.67%	0	0%	10	5	2
Sporting CP	(Portugal)	6	3	50%	2	33.33%	1	16.67%	5	1	5
Sportul Studențesc București	(Romania)	2	1	50%	0	0%	1	50%	2	1	2
St. Gallen	(Switzerland)	2	1	50%	1	50%	0	0%	5	1	5
Standard Liège	(Belgium)	2	1	50%	0	0%	1	50%	2	2	1
Stjarnan	(Iceland)	2	2	100%	0	0%	0	0%	9	0	Inf.
Strasbourg	(France)	2	1	50%	0	0%	1	50%	3	2	1.5
Sturm Graz	(Austria)	2	2	100%	0	0%	0	0%	3	0	Inf.
Torpedo Moscow	(Russia) (Soviet Union)	2	1	50%	1	50%	0	0%	1	0	Inf.
Tottenham Hotspur	(England)	6	3	50%	0	0%	3	50%	11	12	0.91
Trabzonspor	(Turkey)	4	1	25%	1	25%	2	50%	3	3	1
TPS	(Finland)	2	1	50%	0	0%	1	50%	2	1	2
Twente	(Netherlands)	2	1	50%	1	50%	0	0%	3	2	1.5
Union Saint-Gilloise	(Belgium)	1	1	100%	0	0%	0	0%	4	0	Inf.
Universitatea Craiova	(Romania)	2	1	50%	1	50%	0	0%	3	1	3
Urawa Red Diamonds	(Japan)	1	1	100%	0	0%	0	0%	2	1	2
Valencia	(Spain)	10	3	30%	5	50%	2	20%	14	11	1.27
Valletta	(Malta)	2	2	100%	0	0%	0	0%	7	1	7
Vasas	(Hungary)	2	2	100%	0	0%	0	0%	4	1	4
Vaslui	(Romania)	2	1	50%	1	50%	0	0%	4	2	2
Viktoria Plzeň	(Czech Republic)	2	2	100%	0	0%	0	0%	6	0	Inf.
Villarreal	(Spain)	2	1	50%	0	0%	1	50%	2	2	1
Vitesse	(Netherlands)	2	0	0%	2	100%	0	0%	1	1	1
Vitória de Setúbal	(Portugal)	2	1	50%	0	0%	1	50%	1	2	0.5
Werder Bremen	(Germany)	6	2	33.33%	2	33.33%	2	33.33%	9	7	1.29
Wisła Kraków	(Poland)	2	1	50%	0	0%	1	50%	2	1	2
VfL Wolfsburg	(Germany)	2	0	0%	0	0%	2	100%	2	5	0.4
Young Boys	(Switzerland)	1	1	100%	0	0%	0	0%	1	0	Inf.
Zagreb XI	(Croatia) (Socialist Federal Republic of Yugoslavia)	2	2	100%	0	0%	0	0%	5	0	Inf.

=== By country ===
As of 21 October 2026

Key

Positive balance (more wins than losses)
Neutral balance (as many wins as losses)
Negative balance (more losses than wins)

Country	Matches	Wins	Win %	Draws	Draw %	Losses	Loss %	For	Against	For & against ratio
Argentina	6	4	66.66%	1	16.67%	1	16.67%	8	1	8
Austria	18	12	66.67%	1	5.56%	5	27.78%	26	11	2.36
Azerbaijan	4	2	50%	2	50%	0	0%	7	3	2.33
Belgium	12	6	50%	2	16.67%	4	33.33%	19	12	1.58
Brazil	1	0	0%	0	0%	1	100%	0	2	0
Bulgaria	7	4	50%	3	50%	0	0%	10	3	3.33
(Democratic Republic of the Congo) Congo	1	1	100%	0	0%	0	0%	3	0	Inf.
Croatia	4	3	75%	0	0%	1	25%	8	2	4
Cyprus	4	2	50%	2	50%	0	0%	8	6	1.33
Czech Republic	12	9	75%	2	16.67%	1	8.33%	22	6	3.67
England	45	17	37.78%	7	15.55%	21	46.67%	49	55	0.89
Finland	2	1	50%	0	0%	1	50%	2	1	2
France	30	13	43.33%	9	30%	8	26.67%	50	33	1.52
(Georgia (country)) Georgia	2	0	0%	1	50%	1	50%	0	1	0
Germany	60	28	46.67%	11	18.33%	21	35%	101	75	1.35
Greece	8	5	62.5%	1	12.5%	2	25%	16	8	2
Hungary	6	3	50%	2	33.33%	1	16.67%	10	4	2.5
Iceland	2	2	100%	0	0%	0	0%	9	0	Inf.
Israel	2	0	0%	0	0%	2	100%	2	5	0.4
Italy	13	6	46.15%	3	23.08%	4	30.77%	16	8	2
Japan	1	1	100%	0	0%	0	0%	2	1	2
Kazakhstan	1	1	100%	0	0%	0	0%	2	1	2
Latvia	2	2	100%	0	0%	0	0%	7	1	7
Malta	4	4	100%	0	0%	0	0%	15	2	7.5
Mexico	1	0	0%	1	100%	0	0%	1	1	1
Moldova	2	2	100%	0	0%	0	0%	6	2	3
Netherlands	24	12	50%	7	29.17%	5	20.83%	32	20	1.6
Norway	6	3	50%	1	16.67%	2	33.33%	14	9	1.56
Poland	8	5	62.5%	1	12.5%	2	25%	13	5	2.6
Portugal	25	13	52%	8	32%	4	16%	35	20	1.75
Romania	18	12	66.67%	3	16.67%	3	16.67%	38	11	3.45
Russia	20	12	60%	5	25%	3	15%	29	22	1.32
Scotland	13	6	46.15%	4	30.76%	3	23.07%	19	11	1.72
Serbia	11	8	73%	2	18%	1	9%	23	5	4.6
Slovakia	4	3	75%	0	0%	1	25%	8	2	4
South Korea	1	1	100%	0	0%	0	0%	3	0	Inf.
Spain	64	18	28.13%	17	26.56%	29	45.31%	75	95	0.79
Sweden	12	4	33.33%	6	50%	2	16.67%	12	9	1.33
Switzerland	9	5	55.56%	3	33.33%	1	11.11%	16	5	3.2
Turkey	10	5	50%	2	20%	3	30%	16	7	2.29
Ukraine	14	8	57.14%	6	42.86%	0	0%	21	7	3
