= 1960 Ballon d'Or =

Annual association football award event in France

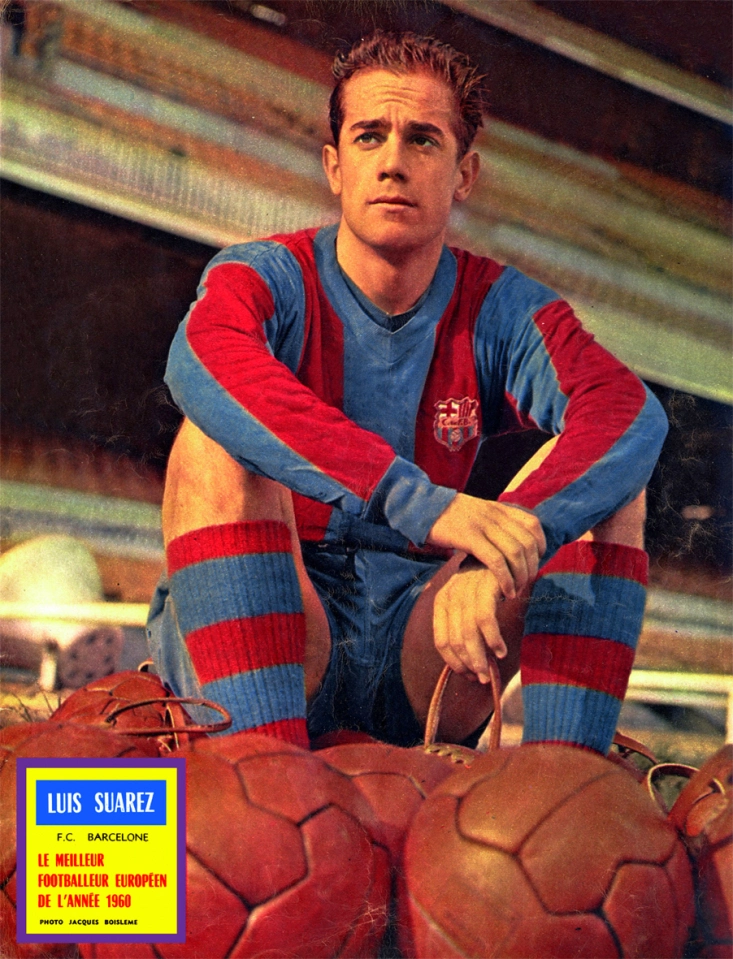
- 1960 Ballon d'Or winner, Luis Suárez
- Date: 13 December 1960
- Location: Paris, France
- Presented by: France Football

Highlights
- Won by: (Spain) Luis Suárez (1st award)
- Website: ballondor.com

The 1960 Ballon d'Or, given to the best football player in Europe as judged by a panel of sports journalists from UEFA member countries, was awarded to Luis Suárez on 13 December 1960.

== Rankings ==
Rank	Name	Club(s)	Nationality	Points
1	Luis Suárez	(Spain) Barcelona	Spain	54
2	Ferenc Puskás	(Spain) Real Madrid	Hungary	37
3	Uwe Seeler	(West Germany) Hamburger SV	West Germany	33
4	Alfredo Di Stéfano	(Spain) Real Madrid	Spain (Note: Despite being born in Argentina, Alfredo Di Stéfano acquired Spanish citizenship in 1956, and would play for the Spain's national team.)	32
5	Lev Yashin	(Soviet Union) Dynamo Moscow	Soviet Union	28
6	Raymond Kopa	(France) Reims	France	14
7	John Charles	(Italy) Juventus	Wales	11
7	Bobby Charlton	(England) Manchester United	England	11
9	Omar Sívori	(Italy) Juventus	Italy	9
9	Horst Szymaniak	(West Germany) Karlsruher SC	West Germany	9
11	Paco Gento	(Spain) Real Madrid	Spain	8
12	Bora Kostić	(Socialist Federal Republic of Yugoslavia) Red Star Belgrade	Yugoslavia	7
13	Joseph Ujlaki	(France) RC Paris	France	5
14	Kurt Hamrin	(Italy) Fiorentina	Sweden	4
14	Bobby Smith	(England) Tottenham Hotspur	England	4
16	Luis del Sol	(Spain) Real Betis (Spain) Real Madrid	Spain	3
16	Jimmy Greaves	(England) Chelsea	England	3
16	Ivan Kolev	(Bulgaria) CDNA Sofia	Bulgaria	3
19	János Göröcs	(Hungary) Újpest	Hungary	2
19	Károly Sándor	(Hungary) MTK Budapest	Hungary	2
19	Dragoslav Šekularac	(Socialist Federal Republic of Yugoslavia) Red Star Belgrade	Yugoslavia	2
19	Agne Simonsson	(Sweden) Örgryte IS (Spain) Real Madrid	Sweden	2
23	Antonio Angelillo	(Italy) Internazionale	Italy	1
23	Gerhard Hanappi	(Austria) Rapid Wien	Austria	1
23	Erich Hof	(Austria) Wiener SC	Austria	1
23	Blagoje Vidinić	(Socialist Federal Republic of Yugoslavia) Radnički Belgrade	Yugoslavia	1
