= Aristide Guarneri =

Italian footballer (born 1938)

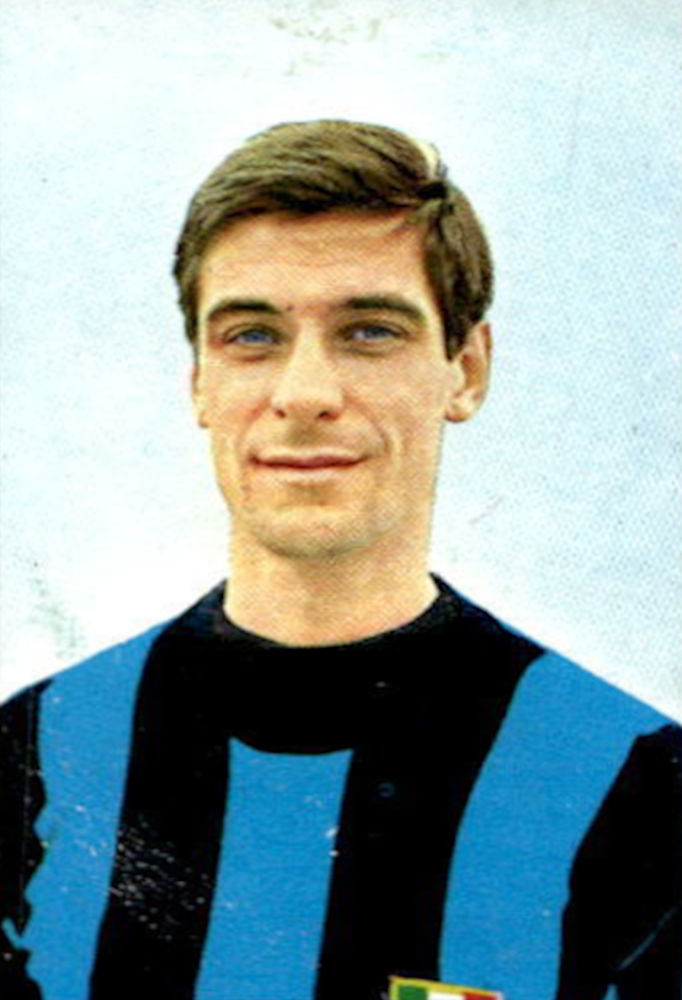
- Guarneri with Inter Milan in 1965

Personal information
- Date of birth: 7 March 1938 (age 88)
- Place of birth: Cremona, Italy
- Height: 1.81 m (5 ft 11 in)
- Position: Defender

Senior career*
Years	Team	Apps	(Gls)
1956–1957	Codogno	?	(?)
1957–1958	Como	32	(0)
1958–1967	Inter Milan	268	(3)
1967–1968	Bologna	28	(1)
1968–1969	Napoli	22	(0)
1969–1970	Inter Milan	3	(0)
1970–1973	Cremonese	8	(0)

International career
1963–1968	Italy	21	(1)

Managerial career
- 1973–1974: Cremonese
- 1980–1981: Sant'Angelo (assistant coach)
- 1981–1982: Parma (assistant coach)
- 1982–1983: Sant'Angelo
- 1983–1984: Soresinese
- 1984–1985: Sant'Angelo
- 1986: Fiorenzuola
- 1992: Inter Milan (assistant coach)
Medal record
Men's football
Representing Italy (as player)
UEFA European Championship
Winner	1968 Italy
- * Club domestic league appearances and goals

Aristide Guarneri (Italian pronunciation: [aˈristide ɡwarˈnɛːri]; born 7 March 1938) is an Italian former footballer who played as a defender. Initially a fullback at the beginning of his career, he was later usually deployed as a centre-back, where he excelled due to his anticipation, tackling, marking, and ability to read the game. Guarneri was known as a "gentleman of the game", as he never received a red-card throughout his career, despite being a tenacious defender.

== Club career ==
Guarnieri began his youth career with Codogna, and he made his professional debut for Como in 1957, also playing for Inter Milan, Bologna, Napoli, and ending his career with Cremonese 1973. He most notably played for the Nerazzurri team known as La Grande Inter under manager Helenio Herrera, between 1958 and 1967, briefly returning to the club to make three appearances during the 1969–70 season. He was part of Nerazzurri's European Cup victories in 1964 and 1965, also winning three Serie A titles, two Intercontinental Cups in 1964 and 1965. Although he was unable to win the Coppa Italia throughout his career, he reached the final during the 1964–65 season, narrowly missing out on a treble with Inter Milan.

== International career ==
Guarnieri obtained 21 caps for the Italy national team between 1963 and 1968, scoring one goal against the USSR in 1966, with Lev Yashin in goal. He made his debut against the defending World Champions Brazil on 12 May 1963, which ended in a 3–0 victory for Italy. He was included in Italy's squad for the 1966 FIFA World Cup, playing one game, and he won the 1968 UEFA European Football Championship with Italy, on home soil.

== Honours ==
Inter Milan

- Serie A: 1962–63, 1964–65, 1965–66
- European Cup: 1963–64, 1964–65
- Intercontinental Cup: 1964, 1965

Italy

- UEFA European Championship: 1968
