= Manuel Giúdice =

Argentine footballer and manager

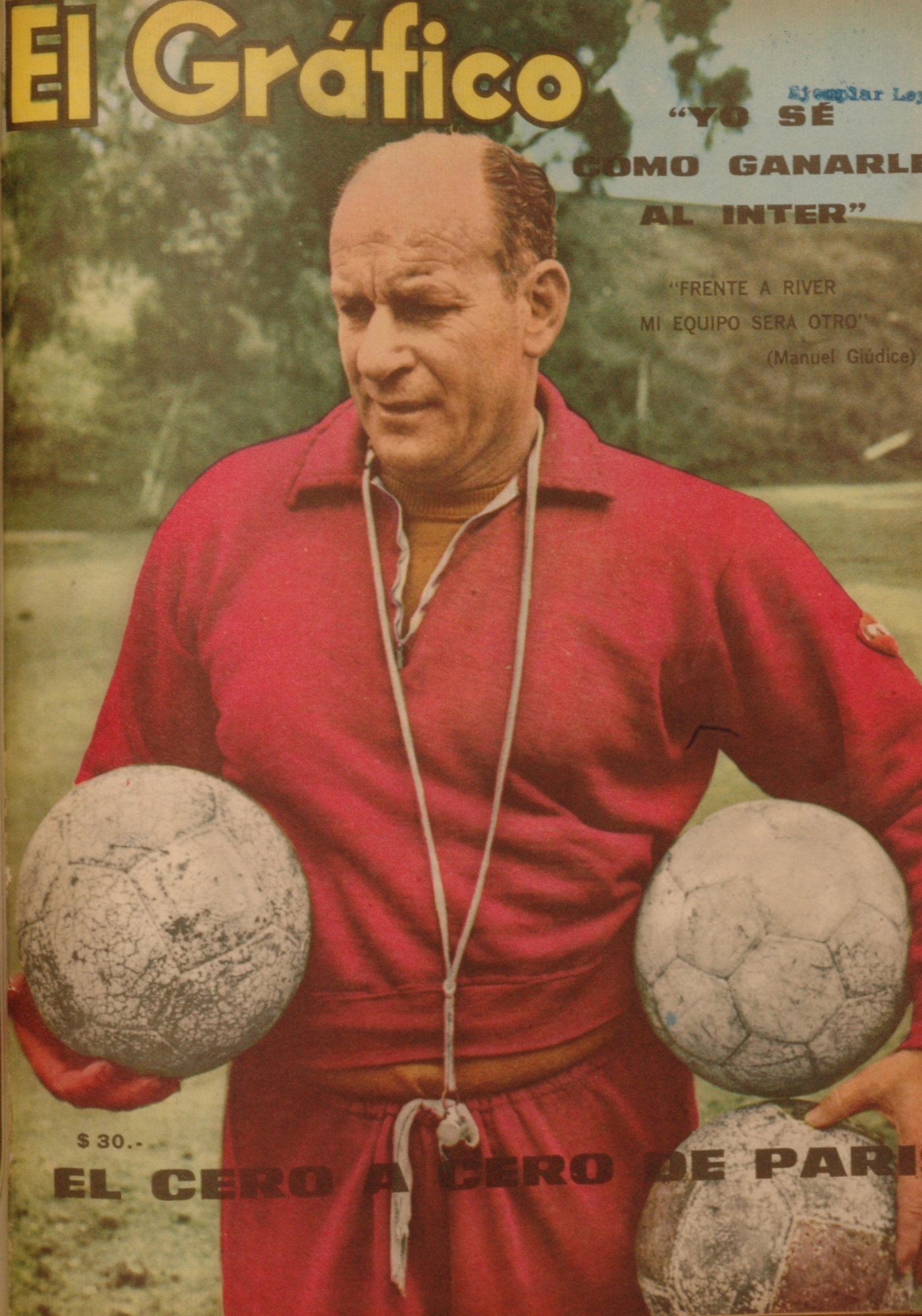
- Giúdice on the cover of El Gráfico 2383 in 1965

Personal information
- Full name: Manuel Ernesto Giúdice
- Date of birth: 15 July 1918
- Place of birth: Córdoba, Argentina
- Date of death: 27 June 1983 (aged 64)
- Place of death: Buenos Aires, Argentina
- Position: Midfielder

Senior career*
Years	Team	Apps	(Gls)
1939–1945	Huracán		
1945–1947	River Plate		
1947–1949	Platense		
1949–1951	Deportivo Cali		

Managerial career
- 1963: Huracán
- 1963–1966: Independiente
- 1966: Rosario Central
- 1968: Vélez Sarsfield
- 1969: San Lorenzo
- * Club domestic league appearances and goals

Manuel Giúdice (15 July 1918 – 27 June 1983) was an Argentine football player and manager. He is mainly known for his successful managing spell at the helm of the Argentine powerhouse Club Atlético Independiente in the mid-1960s.

== Career ==
Born in Córdoba, Giúdice first started playing at several clubs in his home town. In 1939 he transferred to the Buenos Aires–based Club Atlético Huracán and joined a team that featured Emilio Baldonedo, Herminio Masantonio, and Carlos Marinelli and that finished third in the 1939 Argentine top level season. The same team won the Copa Adrián C. Escobar in 1942 and 1943 and the George VI British Competition Cup in 1944.

In 1945 Giúdice joined River Plate, with players such as Aristóbulo Deambrosi, Alfredo Di Stéfano, José Manuel Moreno, and Ángel Labruna. River Plate won the Argentine championship in 1945.

In 1947 he left River Plate to join Club Atlético Platense, but following a 1948 players' strike, which forced many of the great figures of Argentine football to emigrate to other countries, Giúdice moved on to Colombia and signed for Deportivo Cali in 1949. He ended his playing career in 1951.

He then turned to coaching and successfully managed Independiente, leading them national league titles in 1963 and 1970. In 1968, he led Vélez Sarsfield to the Argentine championship; it was the club's first national title. His greatest success was winning the 1964 and 1965 Copa Libertadores cups, also finishing as runners-up in the 1964 and 1965 Intercontinental Cups, losing both times to Inter Milan, at the time coached by fellow Argentine Helenio Herrera.

In his later years he coached Nueva Chicago and Atlético Tucumán in the Argentine second level.

== Honours ==
=== As a player ===
River Plate

- Argentine Primera División: 1945

=== As a manager ===
Independiente

- Argentine Primera División: 1963
- Copa Libertadores: 1964, 1965

Vélez Sarsfield

- Argentine Primera División: 1968
