= Joaquín Peiró =

Spanish footballer (1936–2020)

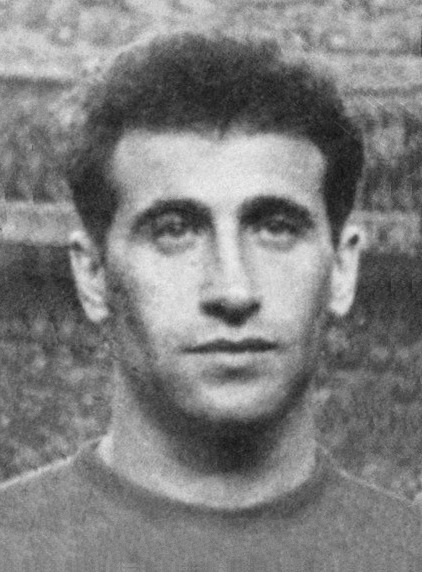
- Peiró in 1962

Personal information
- Full name: Joaquín Peiró Lucas
- Date of birth: 29 January 1936
- Place of birth: Madrid, Spain
- Date of death: 18 March 2020 (aged 84)
- Place of death: Madrid, Spain
- Height: 1.78 m (5 ft 10 in)
- Position: Attacking midfielder

Youth career
- Atlético Madrid
- → Covadonga (loan)
- → Tolosa (loan)
- → Jusa (loan)
- → Ferroviaria (loan)

Senior career*
Years	Team	Apps	(Gls)
1954–1962	Atlético Madrid	166	(95)
1954–1955	→ Murcia (loan)	22	(15)
1962–1964	Torino	46	(10)
1964–1966	Inter Milan	25	(8)
1966–1970	Roma	103	(21)
Total		362	(149)

International career
1959	Spain U21	1	(0)
1956–1959	Spain B	5	(5)
1956–1966	Spain	12	(5)

Managerial career
- 1978–1985: Atlético Madrileño
- 1985–1988: Granada
- 1988–1989: Figueres
- 1990: Atlético Madrid
- 1992–1993: Murcia
- 1997–1998: Badajoz
- 1998–2003: Málaga
- 2003–2004: Murcia
- * Club domestic league appearances and goals

Joaquín Peiró Lucas (29 January 1936 – 18 March 2020) was a Spanish football player and manager.

An attacking midfielder, he excelled at Atlético Madrid where he would start and end his professional career, amassing La Liga totals of 166 games and 95 goals over eight seasons. He then moved to Italy where he would remain for nearly one decade, in representation of three teams.

Peiró represented the Spain national team in two World Cups. Starting in 1978 and for almost 30 years, he worked as a coach before retiring.

== Club career ==
Born in Madrid, Peiró made his senior debut with Real Murcia CF on loan from hometown's Atlético Madrid, playing 16 complete La Liga matches with the latter side in the 1955–66 season to help them finish in fifth position, and subsequently becoming first-choice. He was an essential attacking unit as the club won the 1961–62 European Cup Winners' Cup, scoring in both matches of the final against ACF Fiorentina (1–1 in the first game, 3–0 in the replay).

In 1962, after 127 official goals for Atlético – he still started the 1962–63 campaign, netting six times in only three games– Peiró moved to Italy and joined Torino FC, becoming the second Spaniard to play in Serie A after Luis Suárez, whom he later teamed up with at Inter Milan, being part of the Grande Inter side that won the 1965 European Cup under manager Helenio Herrera; in the semi-finals against Liverpool, he scored once in a 3–0 home win after a 3–1 loss at Anfield.

Peiró's longest spell in Italy would be spent with AS Roma where he won one Coppa Italia, eventually also being named team captain.

== International career ==
Peiró earned 12 caps for Spain over ten years, netting five times. He participated in the 1962 FIFA World Cup in Chile, scoring the only goal in the match against Mexico, and in the 1966 World Cup in England; both tournaments ended in group-stage elimination.

On 3 June 1956, aged 20, Peiró made his international debut, scoring in a 3–1 friendly defeat to Portugal in Lisbon.

== Coaching career ==
Peiró started coaching in 1978, with Atlético's reserves, which he led to Segunda División two years later. Subsequently, he spent some time managing in the second tier and the Segunda División B, promoting Granada CF to the former.

In 1989–90, Peiró was one of three coaches used by Atlético Madrid, as elusive Jesús Gil was the club's president – the side did finish fourth in the league. He resumed his career in division two, interspersed with periods of inactivity.

Peiró's biggest success as a manager came with Málaga CF, which he led to the top flight in 1999 at the age of 63. Subsequently, the Andalusians won the 2002 UEFA Intertoto Cup and reached the quarter-finals of the following UEFA Cup.

Peiró last coached in 2003, being fired midway through the 2003–04 season from Murcia who were relegated from the top tier as last.

== Death ==
After years struggling with health problems, Peiró died in Madrid at the age of 84.

== Career statistics ==
#	Date	Venue	Opponent	Score	Result	Competition
1.	3 June 1956	Jamor, Lisbon, Portugal	Portugal	2–1	3–1	Friendly
2.	15 May 1960	Santiago Bernabéu, Madrid, Spain	England	1–0	3–0	Friendly
3.	17 July 1960	Estadio Nacional, Santiago, Chile	Chile	0–4	1–4	Friendly
4.	18 May 1961	Santiago Bernabéu, Madrid, Spain	Wales	1–0	1–1	1962 World Cup qualification
5.	3 June 1962	Sausalito, Viña del Mar, Chile	Mexico	1–0	1–0	1962 FIFA World Cup

== Honours ==
=== Player ===
Murcia

- Segunda División: 1954–55

Atlético Madrid

- Copa del Generalísimo: 1959–60, 1960–61
- UEFA Cup Winners' Cup: 1961–62

Inter

- Serie A: 1964–65, 1965–66
- European Cup: 1964–65
- Intercontinental Cup: 1964, 1965

Roma

- Coppa Italia: 1968–69

=== Manager ===
Málaga

- Segunda División: 1998–99
- UEFA Intertoto Cup: 2002
