= Luis Suárez (Spanish footballer) =

Spanish footballer (1935–2023)

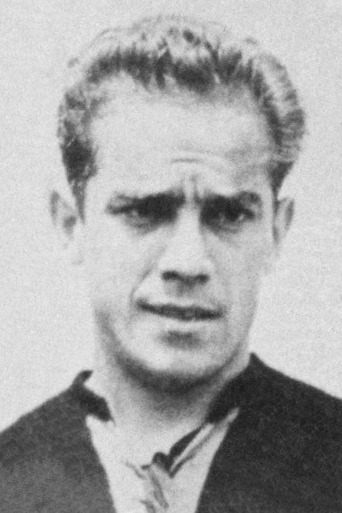
- Suárez in 1962

Personal information
- Full name: Luis Suárez Miramontes
- Date of birth: 2 May 1935
- Place of birth: A Coruña, Spain
- Date of death: 9 July 2023 (aged 88)
- Place of death: Milan, Italy
- Height: 1.75 m (5 ft 9 in)
- Positions: Midfielder; inside forward

Youth career
- Perseverancia
- 1949–1953: Fabril

Senior career*
Years	Team	Apps	(Gls)
1953–1954	Deportivo La Coruña	17	(3)
1954–1955	España Industrial	21	(6)
1955–1961	Barcelona	122	(62)
1961–1970	Inter Milan	256	(42)
1970–1973	Sampdoria	63	(9)
Total		479	(122)

International career
1957–1972	Spain	32	(14)

Managerial career
- 1973–1974: Genoa Primavera
- 1974–1975: Inter Milan
- 1975: Cagliari
- 1977: SPAL
- 1977–1978: Como
- 1978–1979: Deportivo La Coruña
- 1981–1989: Spain U21
- 1988–1991: Spain
- 1992: Inter Milan
- 1995: Albacete
- 1995: Inter Milan (interim)
Medal record
Men's football
Representing Spain
European Nations' Cup
Winner	1964 Spain
- * Club domestic league appearances and goals

Luis Suárez Miramontes (Spanish pronunciation: [ˈlwis ˈswaɾeθ miɾaˈmontes]; 2 May 1935 – 9 July 2023) was a Spanish professional footballer and manager. He played as a midfielder for Deportivo de La Coruña, España Industrial, Barcelona, Inter Milan, Sampdoria; he also represented the Spain national team between 1957 and 1972. Widely regarded as one of the greatest Spanish football players of all time, Suárez was noted for his elegant and fluid style of play and also regarded to be one of the greatest midfielders in the history of the sport.

Nicknamed El Arquitecto – The Architect – or Luisito, in 1960 Suárez became the first Spanish-born player to win the Ballon d'Or. (Note: Alfredo Di Stéfano, who won the Ballon d'Or twice after taking Spanish nationality in 1956, was born in Argentina.) In 1964, he helped Spain win their first European Championship title. Suárez originally achieved prominence as a creative inside forward, or attacking midfielder in modern terms, during his spell at Barcelona in the 1950s, before reaching his prime as a deep-lying playmaker at Inter Milan, where he played a pivotal role in the success of Helenio Herrera's side, and was one of the primary creative forces in the squad, thanks to his skill on the ball, vision, and passing range. He retired as a player in 1973, after three seasons at Sampdoria.

Suárez subsequently began a career as a coach and managed Inter Milan on three occasions, the latter two of which on a caretaker basis. He was also at the helm of both the Spain under-21 national team, which he led to a European Under-21 Championship title in 1986, and the Spanish senior national team, which he led to the round of 16 of the 1990 World Cup. He died in Milan on 9 July 2023, aged 88.

== Club career ==
=== Early life and Deportivo La Coruña ===
Luis Suárez Miramontes was born on 2 May 1935, in A Coruña, Galicia; the last of three brothers, he was raised in the barrio of Monte Alto, where his family owned a butcher shop.

He started playing football at Perseverancia, a local team administered by the Santo Tomás parish; in 1949, aged 14, he joined Deportivo La Coruña, following a successful trial he had attended after reading an advertisement left on La Voz de Galicia by manager Alejandro Scopelli, who was helping the club establish a youth academy.

After coming through the club's youth ranks and playing for their reserve team, Deportivo Fabril, Suárez was promoted to the first team during the 1953–54 season, as part of a squad that was managed by Carlos Iturraspe, and included players such as Pahiño and Arsenio Iglesias. On 6 December 1953, he made his senior debut for Deportivo, starting in a 6–1 league defeat to Barcelona at the Camp de Les Corts. Throughout the rest of the campaign, he established himself as a regular starter for the Galician club, attracting interest by both Real Madrid and Barcelona. He played 17 games and scored three goals for Deportivo.

=== Barcelona ===
In March 1954, Suárez joined fellow La Liga side Barcelona, together with team-mate Dagoberto Moll, for a reported total fee of 600,000 pesetas. The two players were officially registered by the Catalan club at the end of 1953–54 league season, and as such deemed eligible to play in the Copa del Generalísimo of the same year. (Note: At the time, the Spanish Cup took place right after the end of the league season.) He made his debut for Barça on 2 May 1954, the day of his 19th birthday, in a 4–0 victory over his former team Deportivo in the cup's first round; he then served as a regular starter for Ferdinand Daučík's side throughout the rest of the competition, as they eventually lost to Valencia in the final.

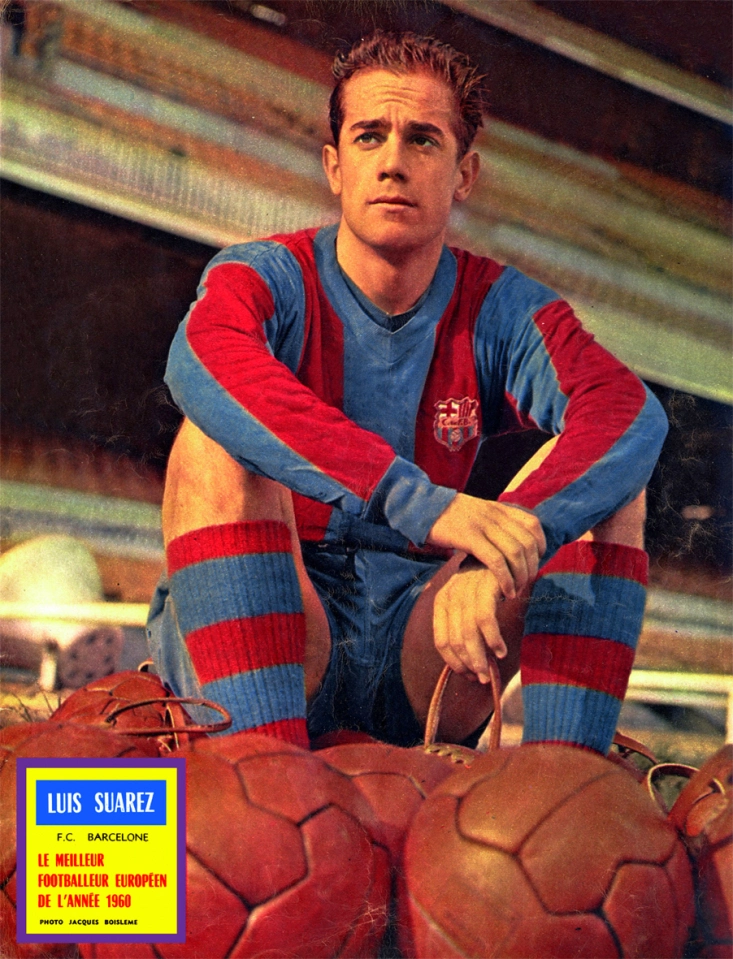
Suárez with Barcelona in 1960

During the 1954–55 season, the midfielder gained limited playing time with the first team, under manager Sandro Puppo, while also featuring for Barcelona's reserve side, España Industrial, in the second division. Throughout the following campaigns, he steadily established himself as a regular starter, although some of his coaches considered him "too frail" physically, with manager Ferenc Plattkó notably forcing him to do extra work-out on a punching bag in order to raise his muscle mass. At the end of the 1956–57 season, he won his first Spanish Cup with the club.

Following the appointment of Helenio Herrera as Barça's manager at the start of the 1958–59 season, Suárez started performing at a consistently high level in the left inside forward position, becoming one of the most important players in a team that also included Ladislao Kubala, Zoltán Czibor, Sándor Kocsis, Ramón Villaverde, Justo Tejada, Evaristo and Eulogio Martínez, among others. With Herrera as coach, the club and Suárez won a domestic league–cup double in the 1958–59 season, and then a league–Fairs Cup double in the following campaign, when they also reached the European Cup semi-finals.

However, during his stint under the French manager, Suárez's relationship with Barcelona fans progressively deteriorated, due to a perceived rivalry between him and Kubala; as a result, the midfielder started getting booed by his own supporters in every game he played.

On 19 October 1960, Suárez scored a goal after a solo action from over the middle of the pitch in a 4–3 Fairs Cup win over Zagreb XI. On 9 November 1960, he scored 1000th European Cup goal in history in a First round 2–2 El Clásico draw. In December of the same year, Suárez received the Ballon d'Or by French magazine France Football, with a total of 54 votes. In the process, he became the first Spanish-born footballer to ever win the prize; after Alexia Putellas's back-to-back victories in 2021 and 2022, he retained the title as the only Spanish-born men's footballer to ever receive the award. Suárez received the Ballon d'Or on 9 March 1961, just a few minutes before the start of a European Cup match against Spartak Hradec Králové.

During his last season at Barcelona, which saw Enric Rabassa, Ljubisa Brocic and Enrique Orizaola take turns to sit in the dug-out, after Herrera had left for Inter Milan, Suárez did not win any trophy. Nevertheless, the team reached the final of the European Cup, where they eventually suffered a 3–2 loss to Benfica: it was the midfielder's last game for the Catalan club.

Throughout seven seasons, Suárez played a total number of 253 matches for Barcelona, scoring 141 goals.

=== Inter Milan ===
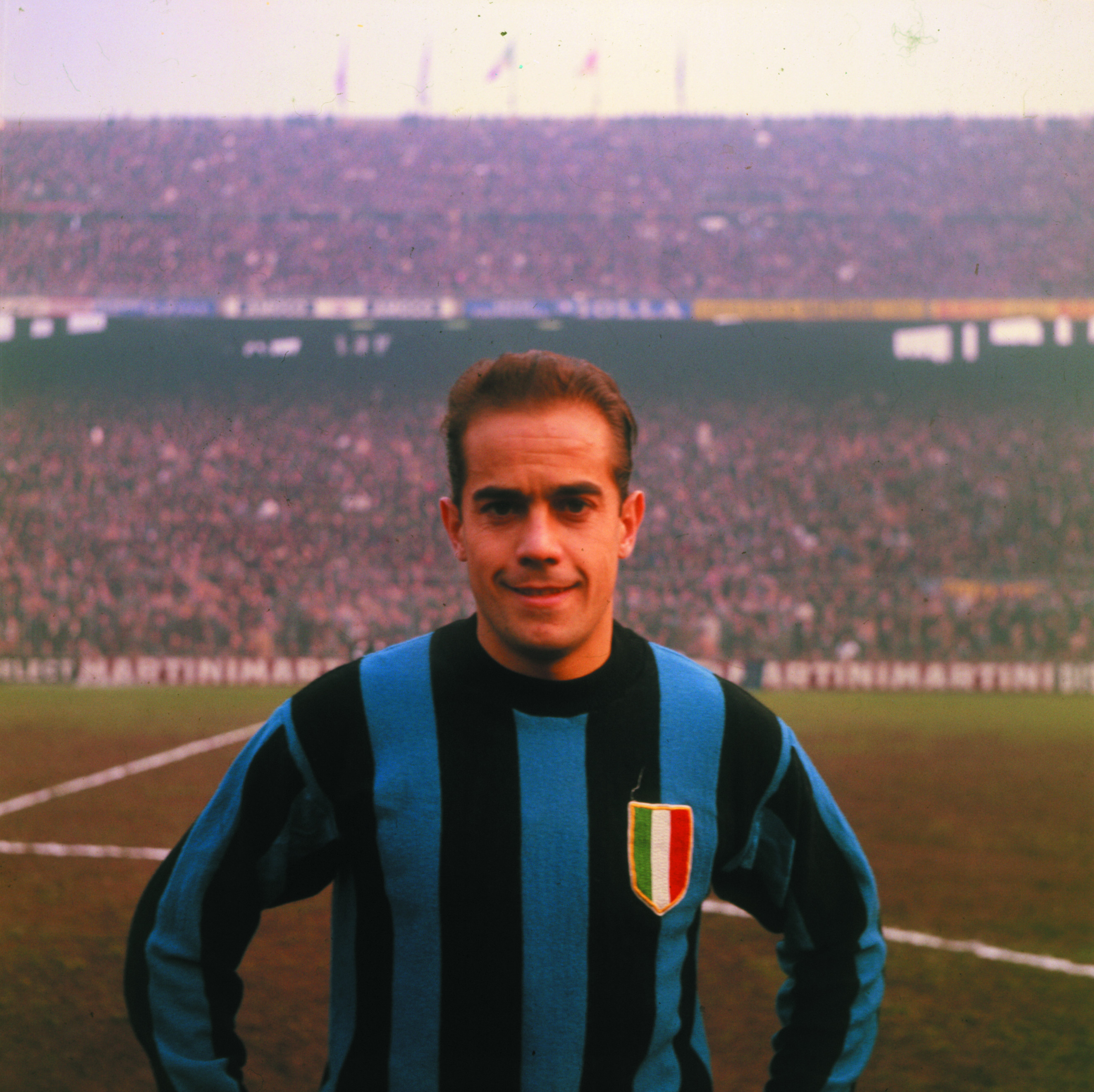
Suárez with Inter Milan at San Siro in the mid-1960s

On 26 May 1961, five days before the final of the European Cup, Barcelona and Italian club Inter Milan reached an agreement for the transfer of Suárez for 25 million Spanish pesetas (£152,000). He subsequently became the world's most expensive footballer, having overtaken the previous record set by Omar Sívori in 1957. He also became the first Spanish footballer to play in Serie A, along with Juan Santisteban. The transfer, which saw Suárez re-unite with manager Herrera, has been considered one of the most controversial decisions in Barcelona's history, as the Catalan club's board reportedly aimed to maximize the revenue in order to repay part of their financial debts, as well as complete the construction of the Camp Nou.

On 27 August 1961, he made his debut and scored his first goal for Inter Milan in a 6–0 league win over Atalanta. In October of the same year, he suffered a knee injury in a Fairs Cup match against Köln, which limited his impact on the pitch during the rest of his first season in Italy. He finished second in the final ranking for the 1961 Ballon d'Or, behind only winner Omar Sívori.

At the start of the following campaign, manager Herrera moved Suárez to the deep-lying playmaker role, where he became one of the key players of the Grande Inter side that famously adopted a counter-attacking style of play. On 10 March 1963, he scored three goals in a 6–0 league win over Genoa: in the process, he became the first Spanish player to ever score a hat-trick in Serie A, and remained the only one to have ever done so until Suso hit the same achievement in 2016. At the end of the 1962–63 season, the midfielder won his first national title with Inter.

In the 1963–64 season, although Inter Milan lost the league title to Bologna in the final tie-breaker, Suárez helped the Nerazzurri win the European Cup. In the second leg of the cup's semi-finals against Borussia Dortmund, the midfielder caused controversy after violently kicking the opposing right-half and injuring him, with referee Branko Tesanić eventually opting against sending the Spanish player off. He then went on to feature in the final in Vienna, where Inter gained a 3–1 win over Real Madrid to win the European title.

On 26 September 1964, Suárez was a part of the Inter side that won the 1964 Intercontinental Cup, having gained a 1–0 victory after extra time over Independiente in the tie-breaking match. In December of the same year, he finished second in the final standings for the 1964 Ballon d'Or, behind winner Denis Law, with the Spanish player publicly expressing his disappointment over this outcome on multiple occasions during his lifetime. After winning his second league title with Inter – and being voted as the best player of the season by the Italian sporting press – , Suárez also helped the Italian club claim their second consecutive European Cup, thanks to a 1–0 over Benfica in the final.

On 25 August 1965, Suárez took part in a friendly match against his former club Barcelona at the Camp Nou: at the 38th minute of the match, he abruptly left the pitch after being on the receiving end of boos from blaugrana supporters since the start of the game, and made a bras d'honneur towards them before reaching the exit, a gesture he eventually came to regret throughout the years. On 8 September of the same year, he once again helped Inter Milan beat Independiente to lift their second Intercontinental Cup in a row. In December of the same year, he was the third most-voted player in the final ranking of the 1965 Ballon d'Or, behind team-mate Giacinto Facchetti and winner Eusébio. Throughout the 1965–66 league campaign, Suárez scored five goals, helping Inter lift their second consecutive national title; his team also reached the semi-finals of the European Cup, before losing to eventual champions Real Madrid.

In May 1967, Suárez was forced to miss the European Cup final against Celtic due to an injury, being subsequently replaced by Mauro Bicicli: Inter eventually suffered a 2–1 defeat. In the following weeks, the Italian club also missed out on their third national title in a row on the last day (in favor of Juventus), and got eliminated by Padova in the Coppa Italia semi-finals: as a result, they finished the campaign without winning a single trophy.

During the 1969–70 campaign, his last season at Inter Milan, Suárez's performances declined due to his deployment as a sweeper: he scored just one goal in the league, as his side finished runners-up behind Cagliari.

Between 1961 and 1970, Suárez made a total amount 333 appearances for Inter, scoring 55 goals.

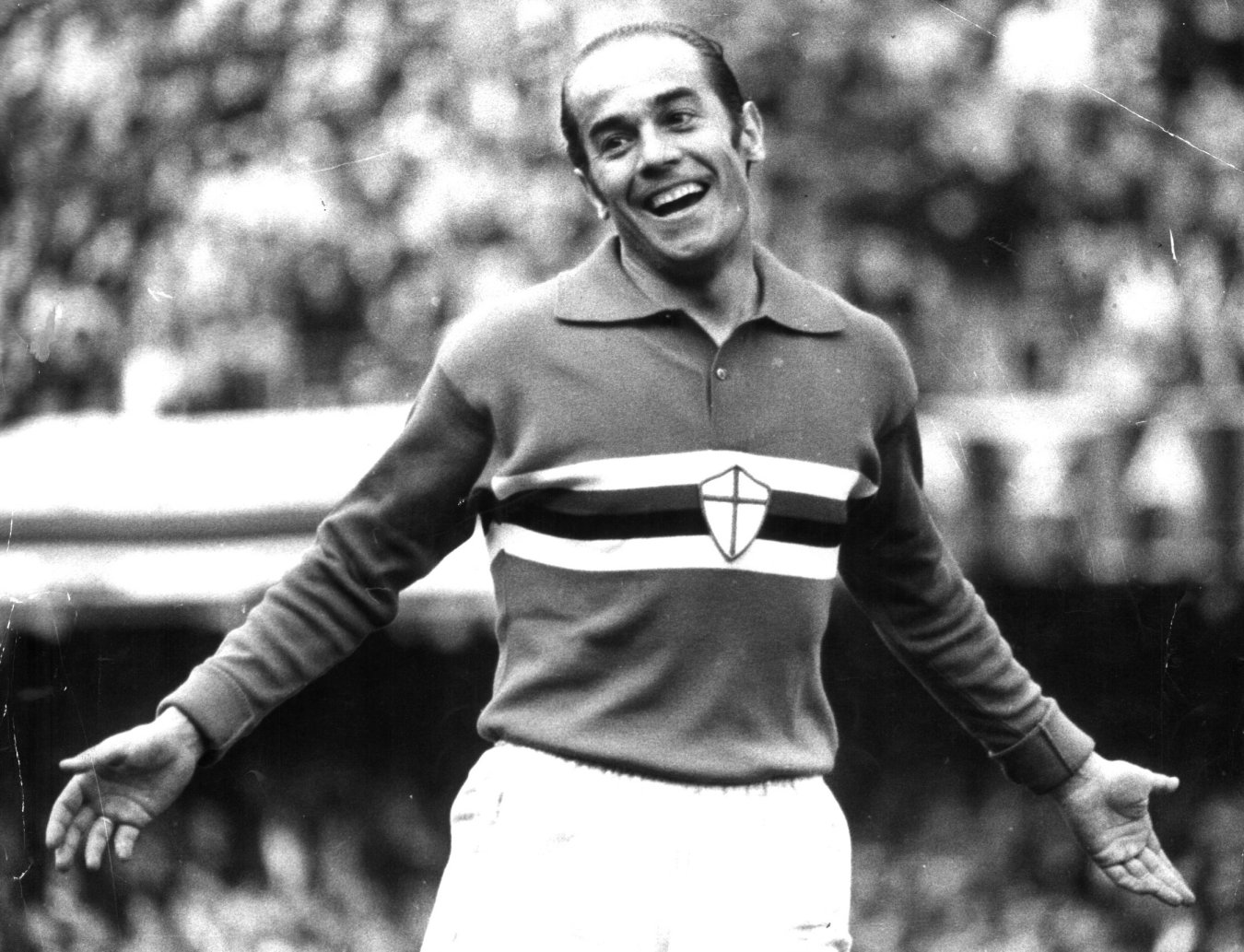
Suárez with Sampdoria in the early 1970s

=== Sampdoria and retirement ===
In July 1970, Suárez was signed by fellow Serie A club Sampdoria, as part of a swap deal that saw Mario Frustalupi join Inter. In Genoa, he moved back into his favoured position in midfield, and became one of the team's most notable players and leaders, together with Giovanni Lodetti. He scored 13 goals in 73 total appearances for the Blucerchiati.

After completing three seasons at Sampdoria, with the club managing to retain their top-flight status in each occasion, he announced his retirement from professional football in 1973, aged 38.

== International career ==
Suárez won 32 caps for the Spain senior national team, having made his debut on 30 January 1957 in a 5–1 victory over the Netherlands, and represented Spain at both the 1962 and 1966 FIFA World Cups. He was part of the Spanish side that won the 1964 European Championship. He played his final game for Spain in 1972, at almost 37 years of age, in a draw against Greece.

== Coaching career ==
Suárez managed his former team Inter Milan on three occasions: during the 1974–75 season as a head coach, and then on a caretaker basis during the 1991–92 and 1995–96 campaigns.

In 1986, he led the Spain under-21 national team to a European Under-21 Championship title; in 1990, he was the manager of the Spanish senior national team at the 1990 World Cup, where they got eliminated in the round of 16.

== Personal life ==
Suárez had two older brothers, José (b. 1924) and Agustín (b. 1926), who also played football, having both started their respective careers at Deportivo La Coruña.

He married his first wife, Nieves, in 1967; the couple had two children, and they lived in Nervi, a quartiere of Genoa, during the footballer's spell at Sampdoria and for several years following his retirement. His younger son, who had been born with congenital cleft palate, died in 1977, aged seven.

Following a divorce, he married his second wife, Valentina (who died in 2020); the couple moved to Milan in 1988, settling in the quartiere of San Siro, close to the eponymous stadium Suárez had played in while at Inter Milan.

=== Later life and personal achievements ===
In June 1989, he received the Castelao Medal by the Xunta de Galicia for his notable contributions in the sporting field.

Since the early 2000s, he worked as a guest pundit for several sports programmes broadcast on Italian and Spanish television networks.

On 20 November 2001, Suárez was awarded the Gold Medal of the Royal Order of Sporting Merit by the Ministry of Education, Culture and Sport for his sporting merits.

In 2008, he received the Golden Foot as a football legend, together with Aldair, Igor Belanov and Zinedine Zidane.

In 2014, he started working for Cadena SER's radio programme Carrusel Deportivo, where he primarily served as a commentator and an analyst for Barcelona's matches.

In July 2015, as part of the celebrations for the 30th anniversary of the FC Barcelona Museum, Suárez donated the Ballon d'Or trophy he received in 1961 to their collection. On 14 December 2016, Spanish sports newspaper Marca awarded him the Marca Leyenda prize for his career and achievements.

== Death ==
Suárez died on 9 July 2023, at the age of 88. The news was first confirmed by former Inter Milan president Massimo Moratti, who revealed the former player and manager had been hospitalized at the Ospedale Niguarda in Milan several days before his death. He was the fourth 1964 European Nations' Cup champion to die in a few months, after Amancio died in February 2023, Fusté in April 2023 and Olivella in May 2023.

A public funeral was held on 11 July, at the Saint Joseph Calasanz Church in Milan: the service was attended by several fans, as well as representatives from Barcelona (Rafa Yuste and Juan Manuel Asensi), Inter Milan (Gianfranco Bedin, Massimo Moratti and Giuseppe Marotta) and Real Madrid (Emilio Butragueño). Deportivo La Coruña, Real and the Spanish Football Federation all reportedly sent flower garlands to pay homage to Suárez.

== Career statistics ==
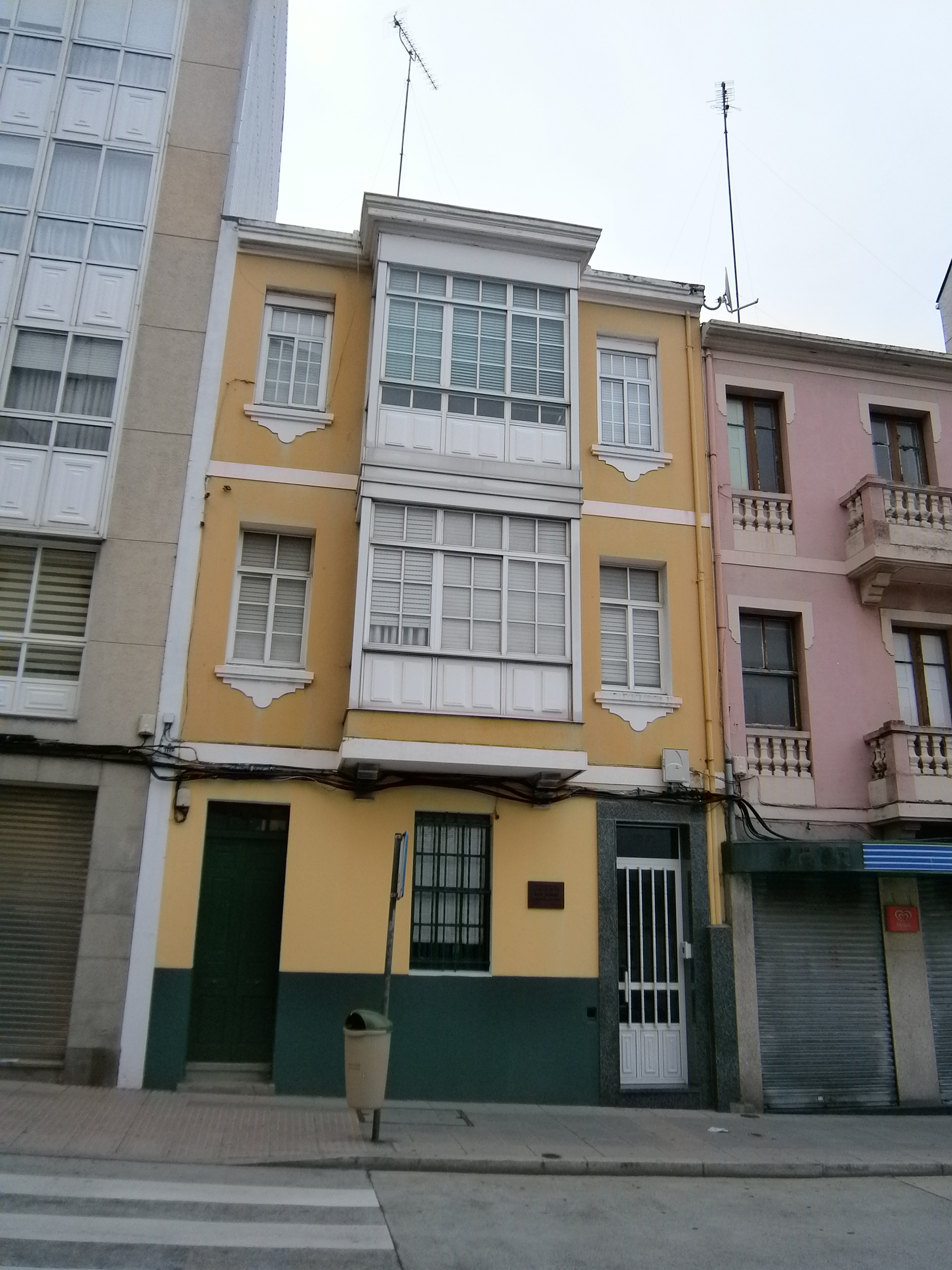
A frontal view of Suárez's birthplace in A Coruña

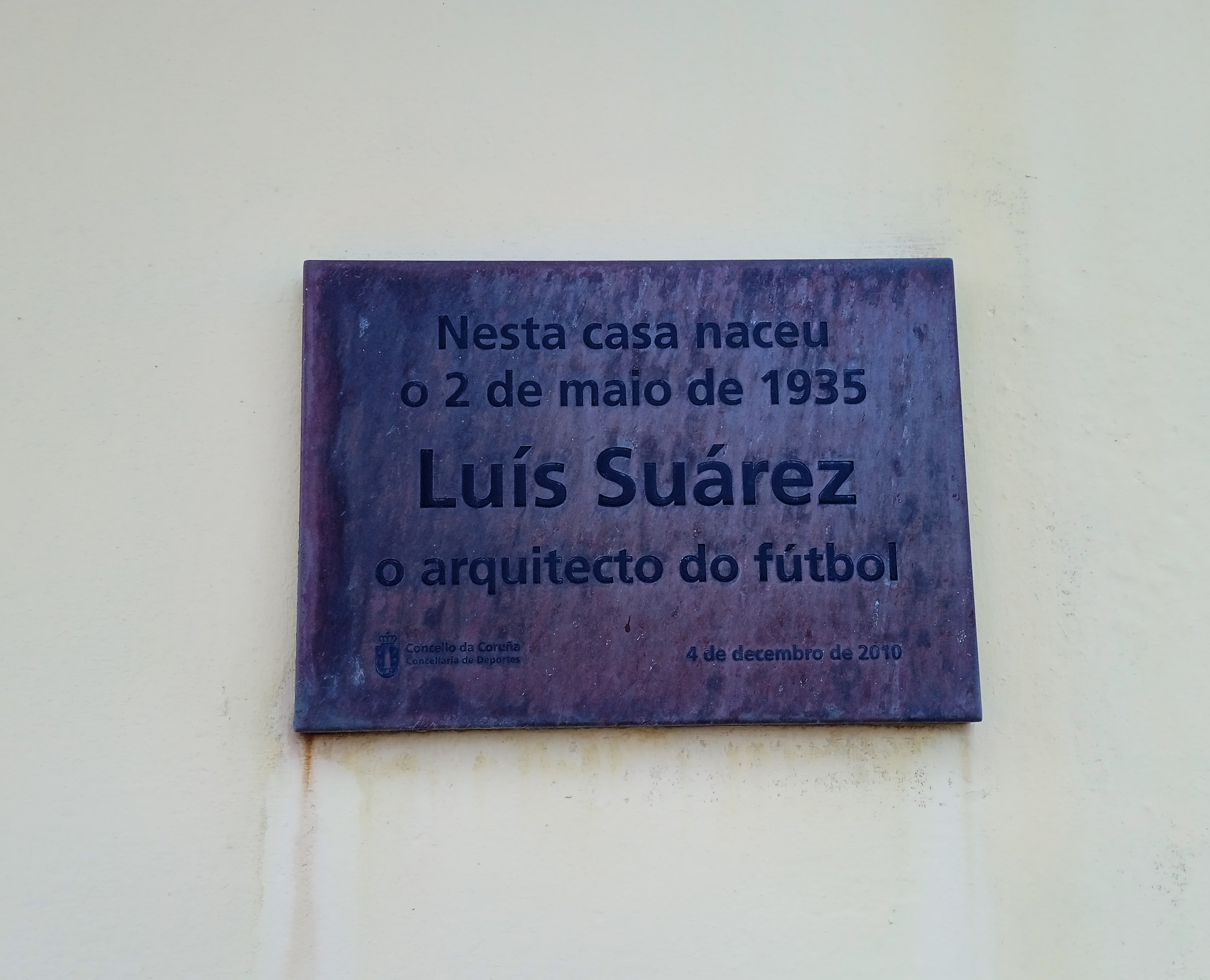
A plaque in Galician language outside Suárez's birthplace. The phrase roughly translates as: "In this house, on 2 May 1935, the architect of football, Luis Suárez, was born"

Appearances and goals by national team and year
National team	Year	Apps	Goals
Spain	1957	6	4
Spain	1958	3	2
Spain	1959	5	5
Spain	1960	7	3
Spain	1961	1	0
Spain	1962	2	0
Spain	1963	1	0
Spain	1964	2	0
Spain	1965	2	0
Spain	1966	2	0
Spain	1967	0	0
Spain	1968	0	0
Spain	1969	0	0
Spain	1970	0	0
Spain	1971	0	0
Spain	1972	1	0
Total		32	14

List of international goals scored by Luis Suárez
No.	Date	Venue	Opponent	Score	Result	Competition
1	10 March 1957	Santiago Bernabéu, Madrid, Spain	Switzerland	1–1	2–2	1958 FIFA World Cup qualification
2	31 March 1957	Heysel, Brussels, Belgium	Belgium	2–0	5–0	Friendly
3	31 March 1957	Heysel, Brussels, Belgium	Belgium	5–0	5–0	Friendly
4	8 May 1957	Hampden Park, Glasgow, Scotland	Scotland	2–2	2–4	1958 FIFA World Cup qualification
5	13 March 1958	Parc des Princes, Paris, France	France	2–1	2–2	Friendly
6	15 October 1958	Santiago Bernabéu, Madrid, Spain	Northern Ireland	4–1	6–2	Friendly
7	28 June 1959	Silesian Stadium, Chorzów, Poland	Poland	1–1	4–2	UEFA Euro 1960 qualifying
8	28 June 1959	Silesian Stadium, Chorzów, Poland	Poland	3–1	4–2	UEFA Euro 1960 qualifying
9	22 November 1959	Mestalla, Valencia, Spain	Austria	2–0	6–3	Friendly
10	22 November 1959	Mestalla, Valencia, Spain	Austria	3–0	6–3	Friendly
11	17 December 1959	Parc des Princes, Paris, France	France	1–0	3–4	Friendly
12	10 July 1960	Estadio Nacional, Lima, Peru	Peru	2–0	3–1	Friendly
13	10 July 1960	Estadio Nacional, Lima, Peru	Peru	3–0	3–1	Friendly
14	26 October 1960	Wembley, London, England	England	2–2	2–4	Friendly

Scores and results list Spain's goal tally first, score column indicates score after each Suárez goal.

== Honours ==
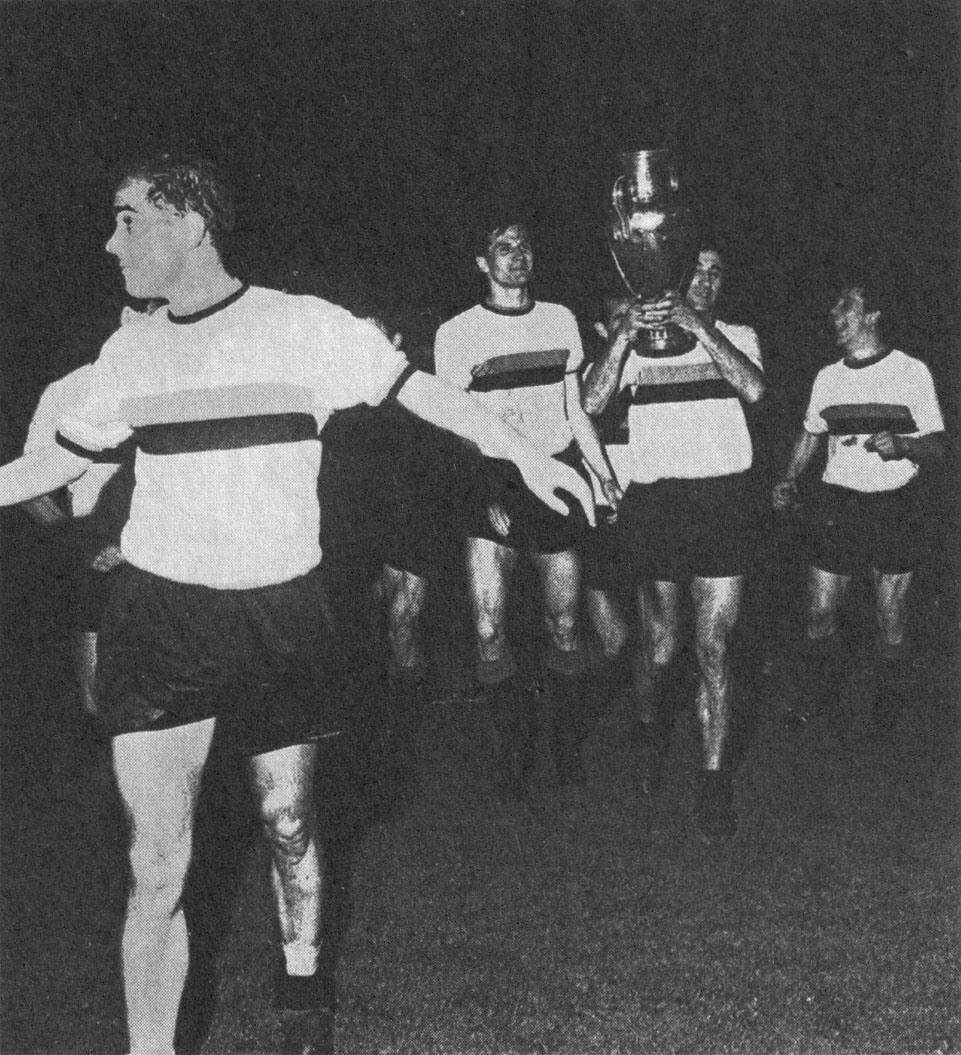
Suárez (foreground) celebrates the 1964–65 European Cup victory with Inter Milan teammates Facchetti, Peiró and Bedin.

=== Player ===
Barcelona

- La Liga: 1958–59, 1959–60
- Copa del Generalísimo: 1957, 1958–59
- Inter-Cities Fairs Cup: 1955–58, 1958–60
- European Cup runner-up: 1960–61

Inter Milan

- Serie A: 1962–63, 1964–65, 1965–66
- European Cup: 1963–64, 1964–65
- Intercontinental Cup: 1964, 1965

Spain

- European Nations' Cup: 1964

=== Manager ===
Spain U21

- UEFA European Under-21 Championship: 1986; runner-up: 1984

=== Individual ===
- Ballon d'Or: 1960
  - Silver Ball: 1961, 1964
  - Bronze Ball: 1965
- Eric Batty's World XI: 1963, 1964, 1965
- FUWO European Team of the Year: 1965
- UEFA European Championship Team of the Tournament: 1964
- Golden Foot: 2008, as football legend
- Marca Leyenda: 2016

=== Orders ===
- Gold Medal of the Royal Order of Sporting Merit: 2001
