= 1964 Intercontinental Cup =

- Inter Milan, winners, posing with the trophy
- Event: Intercontinental Cup
| Independiente | Inter Milan |
| (Argentina) | (Italy) |
- 2–2 on points Inter Milan won after a play-off

First leg
| Independiente | Inter Milan |
| 1 | 0 |
- Date: 9 September 1964
- Venue: La Doble Visera, Avellaneda
- Referee: Armando Marques (Brazil)
- Attendance: 65,000

Second leg
| Inter Milan | Independiente |
| 2 | 0 |
- Date: 23 September 1964
- Venue: San Siro, Milan
- Referee: Gyula Gere (Hungary)
- Attendance: 50,164

Play-off
| Inter Milan | Independiente |
| 1 | 0 |
- After extra time
- Date: 26 September 1964
- Venue: Santiago Bernabéu, Madrid
- Referee: José María Ortiz de Mendíbil (Spain)
- Attendance: 25,000

The 1964 Intercontinental Cup was an association football tie in September 1964 between Independiente and Inter Milan.

The first leg was held on 9 September 1964 in Avellaneda, and won 1–0 by Independiente. Two weeks later, Inter won the return leg, 2-0. A playoff was therefore held, at Santiago Bernabéu Stadium, Madrid, with Inter winning in extra time with a goal from Mario Corso.

== Qualified teams ==
| Team | Qualification | Previous finals app. |
|---|---|---|
| (Italy) Inter Milan | 1963–64 European Cup champion | None |
| (Argentina) Independiente | 1964 Copa Libertadores champion | None |

== Venues ==
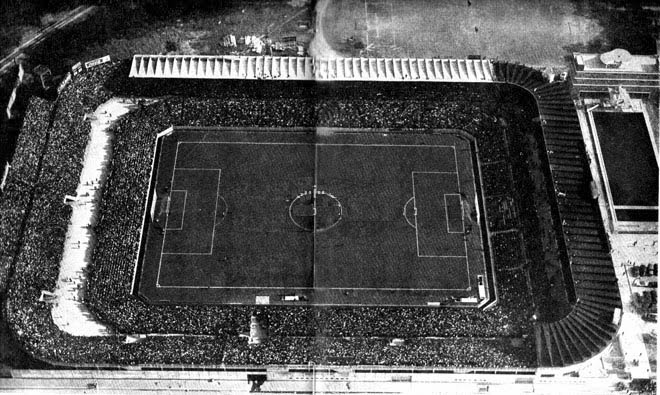
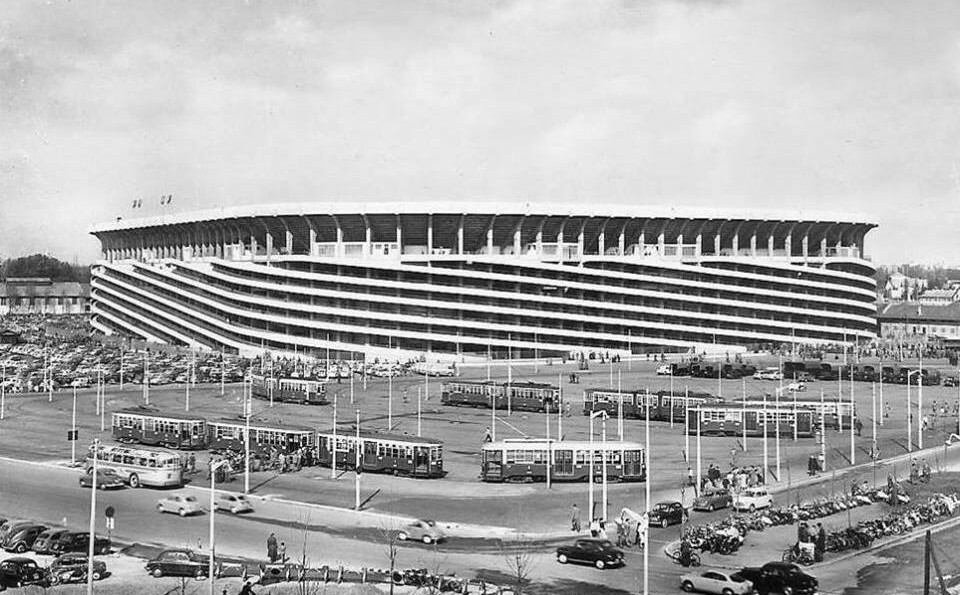
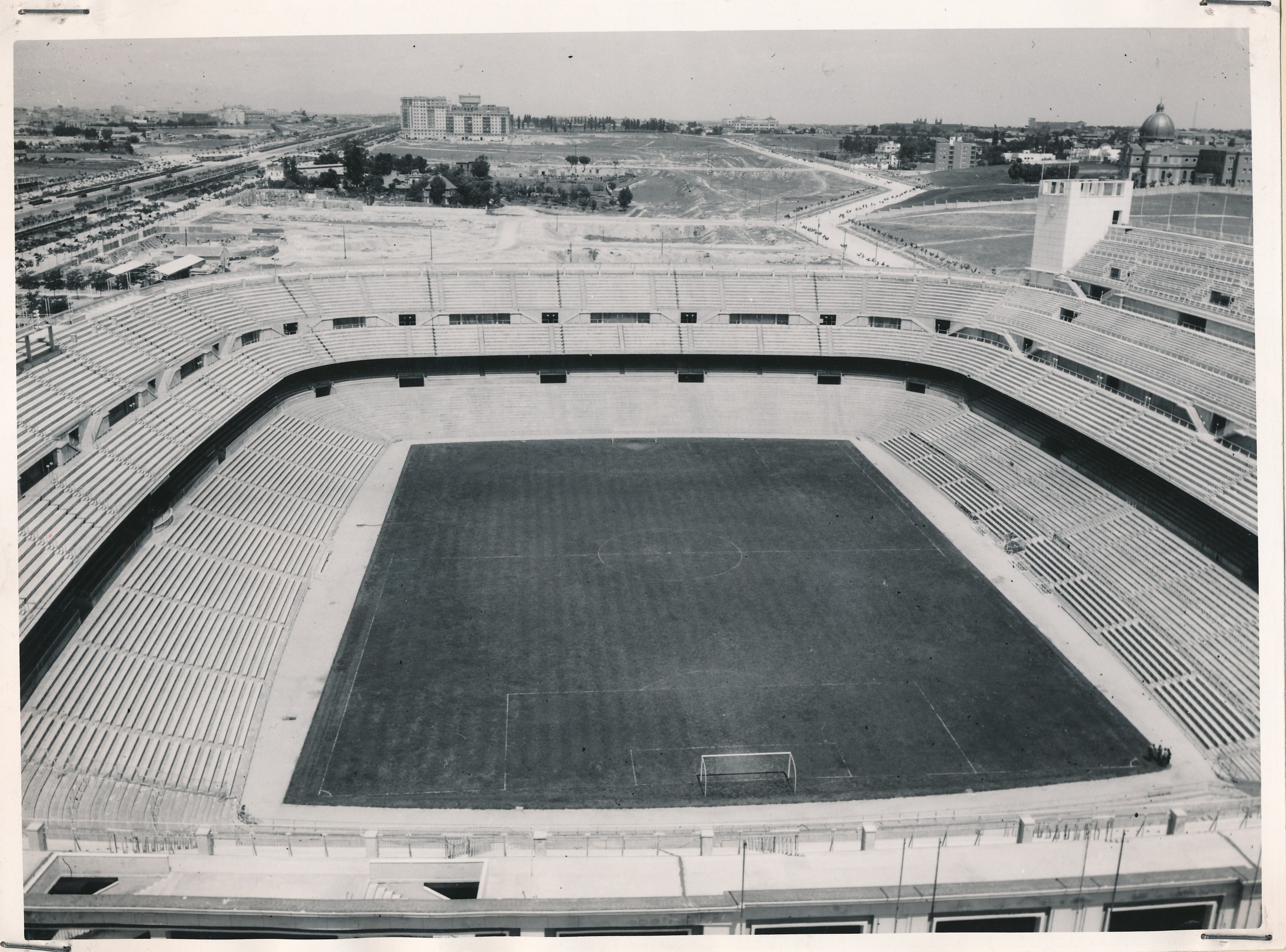
Independiente Stadium, San Siro and Santiago Bernabéu Stadium, venues for the series

== Match details ==
=== First leg ===
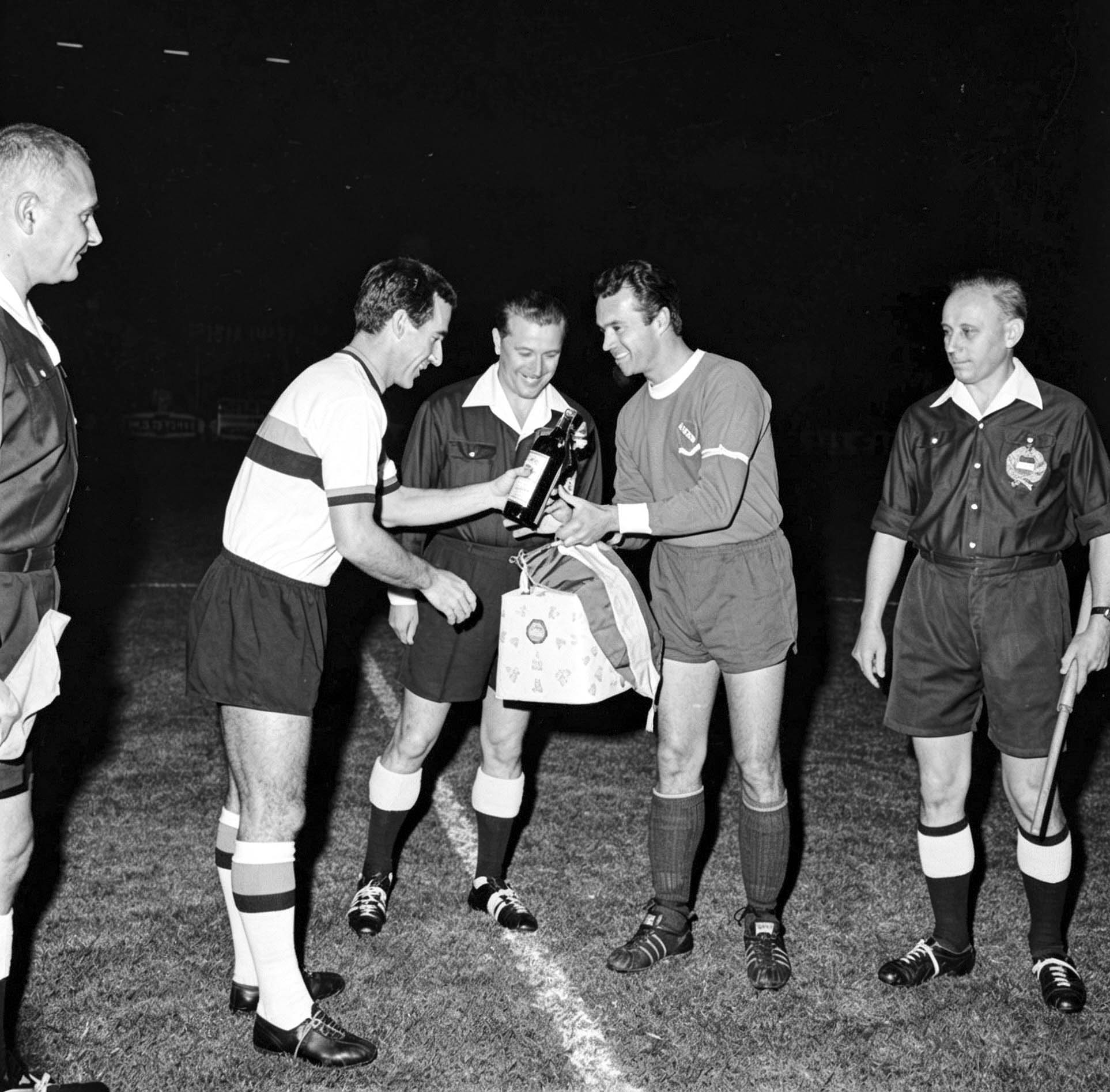
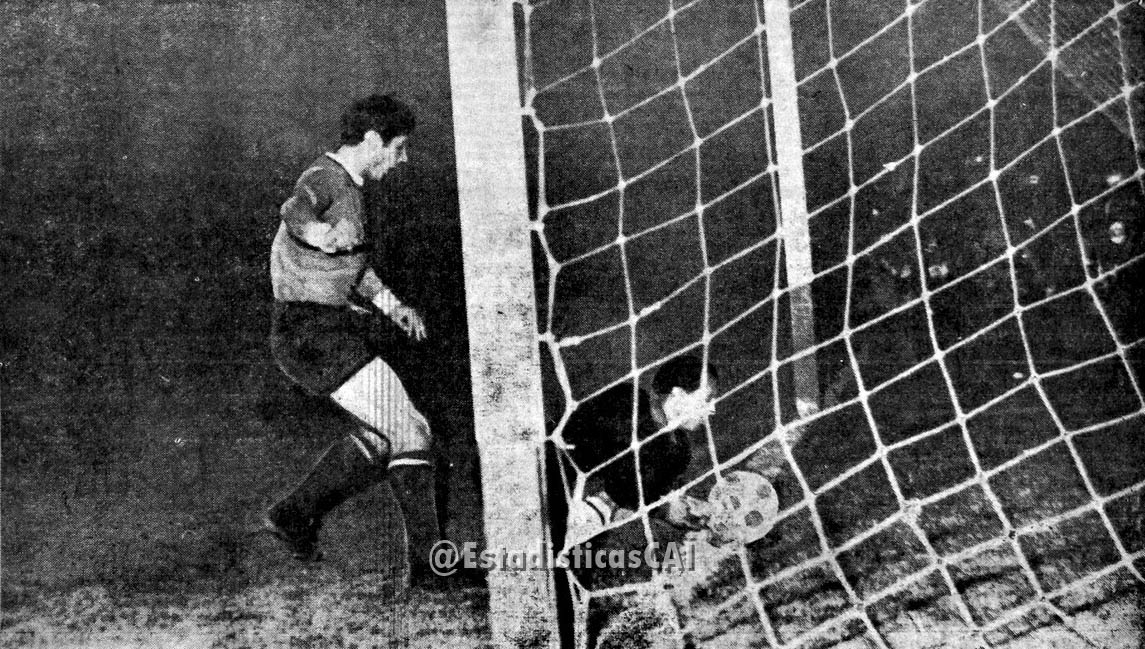
(Left): Both captains salute before the first leg in Avellaneda; (right): Mario Rodríguez scoring the only goal of the match
9 September 1964
First leg

| Independiente (Argentina) | 1–0 | (Italy) Inter Milan |
|---|---|---|
| Rodríguez 59' | Report |

Independiente Stadium, Avellaneda
Attendance: 65,000
Referee: Armando Marques (Brazil)

| Independiente | Inter Milan |

=== Second leg ===
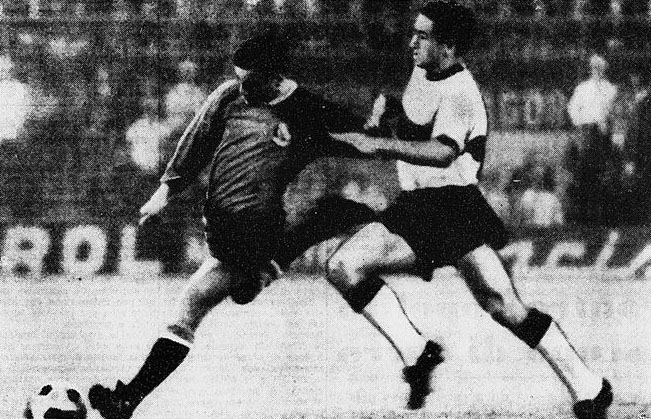
Osvaldo Mura (left) marked by Saul Malatrasi in San Siro Stadium

23 September 1964
Second leg

| Inter Milan (Italy) | 2–0 | (Argentina) Independiente |
|---|---|---|
| Mazzola 8'; Corso 34' | Report |

San Siro, Milan
Attendance: 50,164
Referee: Gyula Gere (Hungary)

| Inter Milan | Independiente |

=== Play-off ===
26 September 1964
Playoff

| Inter Milan (Italy) | 1–0 (a.e.t.) | (Argentina) Independiente |
|---|---|---|
| Corso 110' | Report |

Santiago Bernabéu, Madrid
Attendance: 25,000
Referee: José María Ortiz de Mendíbil (Spain)

| Inter Milan | Independiente |

| GK | 1 | (Italy) Giuliano Sarti |
| DF | 2 | (Italy) Armando Picchi |
| DF | 3 | (Italy) Giacinto Facchetti (c) |
| DF | 4 | (Italy) Saul Malatrasi |
| DF | 5 | (Italy) Aristide Guarneri |
| MF | 6 | (Italy) Carlo Tagnin |
| MF | 7 | (Italy) Angelo Domenghini |
| FW | 8 | (Spain) Joaquín Peiró |
| FW | 9 | (Italy) Aurelio Milani |
| FW | 10 | (Spain) Luis Suárez |
| FW | 11 | (Italy) Mario Corso |
Manager:
(Argentina) Helenio Herrera

| GK | 1 | (Argentina) Miguel Ángel Santoro |
| DF | 2 | (Argentina) Juan C. Guzmán |
| DF | 3 | (Argentina) Raúl Decaría |
| DF | 4 | (Argentina) José A. Paflik |
| DF | 5 | (Argentina) David Acevedo |
| MF | 6 | (Argentina) Jorge Maldonado (c) |
| MF | 7 | (Argentina) Raúl Bernao |
| FW | 8 | (Argentina) Pedro Prospitti |
| FW | 9 | (Argentina) Luis Suárez |
| FW | 10 | (Argentina) Mario Rodríguez |
| FW | 11 | (Argentina) Raúl Savoy |
Manager:
(Argentina) Manuel Giúdice
