= 1983–84 AC Milan season =

Milan Associazione Calcio
1983–84 season
- Owner: Giuseppe Farina
- President: Giuseppe Farina
- Manager: Ilario Castagner (until March 1984); Italo Galbiati
- Stadium: San Siro
- Serie A: 6th
- Coppa Italia: Quarter-finals
- Top goalscorer: League: Damiani (7); All: Damiani (11)
- Average home league attendance: 53,136
Home colours	Away colours

During the 1983–84 season, Milan Associazione Calcio competed in Serie A and Coppa Italia.

== Summary ==
Back to Serie A, Milan were set for a transition season. The transfer session in summer 1983 began with a contested decision of president Farina, to not keep the former Interisti who had done so well in the previous season, especially Serena and Pasinato, for whom the fans clamored for reconfirmation. Thus, the two returned to the Nerazzurri. Scottish forward Jordan also left the club. The main signing of the summer was that of Luther Blissett. The Watford striker was the First Division's top goalscorer the previous season, with 27 goals. Expectations were high for him, but he did not meet them over the course of the season, and he rather became infamous for his many mistakes from a short distance to the opponent's goal. Also signed that season were Eric Gerets, captain of the Belgian national team, and Luciano Spinosi from Verona. Another debut in the first team directly from the prolific Rossoneri youth team was that of Filippo Galli. Milan season went on with a certain tranquility, with the club maintaining a stable position in the mid of the table. In March, coach Ilario Castagner, guilty of having made an agreement with Inter for the coming season, was sacked by president Farina after a 2-2 draw against Fiorentina. Farina would later declare: "I would have never imagined organizing the next transfer campaign with the future coach of Inter." It is the eve of a delicate home game against Napoli. Italo Galbiati was once again selected as the new coach, but the team suffered the psychological backlash and lost 0-2. Farina was challenged openly by the public for the first time and was forced to leave the grandstand during the interval. In the Coppa Italia, Milan was eliminated in the quarter-finals by Roma, after two heated matches (1-1 at the Stadio Olimpico and 1-2 at the San Siro), which then went on to win the trophy.

== Squad ==
Note: Flags indicate national team as defined under FIFA eligibility rules; some limited exceptions apply. Players may hold more than one non-FIFA nationality.

Pos.	Nation	Player
GK	ITA	Giulio Nuciari
GK	ITA	Ottorino Piotti
DF	ITA	Franco Baresi
DF	ITA	Catello Cimmino
DF	ITA	Filippo Galli
DF	BEL	Eric Gerets
MF	ITA	Luigi Russo
DF	ITA	Luciano Spinosi
DF	ITA	Mauro Tassotti
MF	ITA	Sergio Battistini
MF	ITA	Gabriello Carotti

Pos.	Nation	Player
MF	ITA	Alberico Evani
MF	ITA	Andrea Icardi
MF	ITA	Andrea Manzo
MF	ITA	Daniele Tacconi
MF	ITA	Vinicio Verza
FW	ENG	Luther Blissett
FW	ITA	Oscar Damiani
FW	ITA	Giuseppe Incocciati
FW	ITA	Ricardo Paciocco
FW	ITA	Paolo Valori

=== Transfers ===
In
Pos.	Name	from	Type
DF	Filippo Galli	Pescara	
DF	Eric Gerets	Standard Liège	
DF	Luigi Russo	Ternana	
DF	Luciano Spinosi	Verona	
MF	Gabriello Carotti	Ascoli	
MF	Andrea Manzo	Fiorentina	
MF	Daniele Tacconi	Pescara	
FW	Luther Blissett	Watford	
FW	Alberto Cambiaghi	Brescia	loan end
FW	Ricardo Paciocco	Jesi	
FW	Fabio Valente	Sant'Angelo	loan end
FW	Paolo Valori	Sant'Angelo	

Out
Pos.	Name	To	Type
DF	Paolo Benetti	Fano	
DF	Roberto Biffi	Foggia	
DF	Nazzareno Canuti	Inter	loan end
DF	Maurizio Longobardo	Pisa	
MF	Stefano Cuoghi	Modena	
MF	Maurizio D'Este	Rimini	
MF	Massimo Gadda	Reggiana	loan
MF	Tiziano Manfrin	Pistoiese	
MF	Giancarlo Pasinato	Inter	loan end
MF	Francesco Romano	Triestina	
FW	Alberto Cambiaghi	Treviso	loan
FW	Joe Jordan	Verona	
FW	Aldo Serena	Inter	loan end
FW	Fabio Valente	Casale	
FW	Ricardo Paciocco	Lecce	

== Competitions ==
=== Serie A ===
==== League table ====
Pos	Team	Pld	W	D	L	GF	GA	GD	Pts	Qualification or relegation
4	Internazionale	30	12	11	7	37	23	+14	35	Qualification to UEFA Cup
5	Torino	30	11	11	8	37	30	+7	33	
6	Milan	30	10	12	8	37	40	−3	32	
7	Sampdoria	30	12	8	10	36	30	+6	32	
8	Hellas Verona	30	12	8	10	43	35	+8	32	

Source: RSSSF.com
Rules for classification: 1) Points; 2) Head-to-head points; 3) Head-to-head goal difference; 4) Goal difference; 5) Goals scored; 6) Draw. (Note: Head-to-head record is used only after all the matches between the teams in question have been played).

==== Results by round ====
Round	1	2	3	4	5	6	7	8	9	10	11	12	13	14	15	16	17	18	19	20	21	22	23	24	25	26	27	28	29	30
Ground	A	H	A	H	A	H	H	A	H	A	H	A	H	A	H	H	A	H	A	H	A	A	H	A	H	A	H	A	H	A
Result	L	W	L	W	L	W	W	L	D	D	W	W	L	D	D	W	D	D	D	L	D	D	D	D	L	L	D	W	W	W
Position	12	7	12	8	10	8	6	7	8	9	7	7	7	9	10	8	8	7	7	8	8	8	8	8	8	9	10	9	8	8

Source: Competitive matches
A = Away; H = Home; W = Win; D = Draw; L = Loss; = Leader, 1984–85 European Cup; = 1984–85 UEFA Cup; = 1984-85 Serie B

==== Matches ====
11 September 1983 1	Avellino	4–0	Milan	Avellino
	Bergossi 31', 68'; Barbadillo 39'; Colomba 80'	Report		Stadium: Stadio Partenio; Attendance: 36,887; Referee: Ciulli

18 September 1983 2	Milan	4–2	Hellas Verona	Milan
	Damiani 16', 70'; Gerets 47'; Blissett 79'	Report	19' Fanna; 61' Galderisi	Stadium: Stadio Giuseppe Meazza; Attendance: 62,604; Referee: Redini

25 September 1983 3	Roma	3–1	Milan	Rome
	Vincenzi 33'; Maldera 44'; Falcão 82'	Report	28' Battistini	Stadium: Stadio Olimpico; Attendance: 66,549; Referee: Mattei

2 October 1983 4	Milan	2–1	Catania	Milan
	Evani 39', 79'	Report	78' Pedrinho	Stadium: Stadio Giuseppe Meazza; Attendance: 54,089; Referee: Bianciardi

9 October 1983 5	Juventus	2–1	Milan	Turin
	Platini 5'; Rossi 18'	Report	79' (pen.) Baresi	Stadium: Stadio Comunale Vittorio Pozzo; Attendance: 65,948; Referee: Lo Bello

23 October 1983 6	Milan	2–1	Sampdoria	Milan
	Carotti 4'; Verza 64'	Report	74' Scanziani	Stadium: Stadio Giuseppe Meazza; Attendance: 59,042; Referee: Menicucci

30 October 1983 7	Milan	4–1	Lazio	Milan
	Battistini 13', 40'; Blissett 19'; Carotti 55'	Report	47' Manfredonia	Stadium: Stadio Giuseppe Meazza; Attendance: 41,721; Referee: Pieri

6 November 1983 8	Inter Milan	2–0	Milan	Milan
	Serena 5'; Müller 18'	Report		Stadium: Stadio Giuseppe Meazza; Attendance: 78,727; Referee: Bergamo

20 November 1983 9	Milan	2–2	Fiorentina	Milan
	Damiani 14'; Baresi 83' (pen.)	Report	36' Oriali; 60' (o.g.) Tassotti	Stadium: Stadio Giuseppe Meazza; Attendance: 57,696; Referee: D'Elia

27 November 1983 10	Napoli	0–0	Milan	Naples
		Report		Stadium: Stadio San Paolo; Attendance: 59,804; Referee: Pieri

4 December 1983 11	Milan	1–0	Genoa	Milan
	Battistini 28'	Report		Stadium: Stadio Giuseppe Meazza; Attendance: 45,071; Referee: Ciulli

11 December 1983 12	Ascoli	2–4	Milan	Ascoli Piceno
	Novellino 2', 72'	Report	18', 74', 90' Damiani; 54' Verza	Stadium: Stadio Cino e Lillo Del Duca; Attendance: 22,249; Referee: Altobelli

18 December 1983 13	Milan	0–1	Torino	Milan
		Report	69' Dossena	Stadium: Stadio Giuseppe Meazza; Attendance: 35,087; Referee: Barbaresco

31 December 1983 14	Pisa	0–0	Milan	Pisa
		Report		Stadium: Stadio Arena Garibaldi; Attendance: 24,438; Referee: Lo Bello

8 January 1984 15	Milan	3–3	Udinese	Milan
	Baresi 8' (pen.); Verza 43'; Blissett 81'	Report	40', 84' Zico; 87' Causio	Stadium: Stadio Giuseppe Meazza; Attendance: 68,359; Referee: Mattei

15 January 1984 16	Milan	1–0	Avellino	Milan
	Galli 69'	Report		Stadium: Stadio Giuseppe Meazza; Attendance: 41,094; Referee: Ciulli

22 January 1984 17	Hellas Verona	1–1	Milan	Verona
	Galderisi 58'	Report	74' (o.g.) Tricella	Stadium: Stadio Marcantonio Bentegodi; Attendance: 40,538; Referee: Lanese

29 January 1984 18	Milan	1–1	Roma	Milan
	Verza 54'	Report	59' Pruzzo	Stadium: Stadio Giuseppe Meazza; Attendance: 60,497; Referee: Agnolin

12 February 1984 19	Catania	1–1	Milan	Catania
	Bilardi 38'	Report	4' Carotti	Stadium: Stadio Cibali; Attendance: 31,558; Referee: Benedetti

19 February 1984 20	Milan	0–3	Juventus	Milan
		Report	13' Platini; 65' Rossi; 84' Vignola	Stadium: Stadio Giuseppe Meazza; Attendance: 78,479; Referee: Lo Bello

26 February 1984 21	Sampdoria	1–1	Milan	Genoa
	Pari 58'	Report	6' Tassotti	Stadium: Stadio Luigi Ferraris; Attendance: 23,389; Referee: Altobelli

11 March 1984 22	Lazio	0–0	Milan	Roma
		Report		Stadium: Stadio Olimpico; Attendance: 57,162; Referee: Barbaresco

18 March 1984 23	Milan	0–0	Inter Milan	Milan
		Report		Stadium: Stadio Giuseppe Meazza; Attendance: 67,597; Referee: Ciulli

25 March 1984 24	Fiorentina	2–2	Milan	Florence
	Oriali 1'; Passarella 49' (pen.)	Report	72' (pen.) Carotti; 90' Icardi	Stadium: Stadio Comunale; Attendance: 47,871; Referee: Paparesta

1º April 1984 25	Milan	0–2	Napoli	Milan
		Report	50' De Rosa; 53' Dal Fiume	Stadium: Stadio Giuseppe Meazza; Attendance: 37,872; Referee: Mattei

15 April 1984 26	Genoa	2–0	Milan	Genoa
	Onofri 75'; Briaschi 87' (pen.)	Report		Stadium: Stadio Luigi Ferraris; Attendance: 27,184; Referee: Vitali

21 April 1984 27	Milan	0–0	Ascoli	Milan
		Report		Stadium: Stadio Giuseppe Meazza; Attendance: 37,019; Referee: Lombardo

29 April 1984 28	Torino	1–2	Milan	Torino
	Hernández 11' (pen.)	Report	32' Carotti; 63' Blissett	Stadium: Stadio Comunale Vittorio Pozzo; Attendance: 20,248; Referee: Leni

6 May 1984 29	Milan	2–1	Pisa	Milan
	Damiani 7'; Blissett 66'	Report	4' Criscimanni	Stadium: Stadio Giuseppe Meazza; Attendance: 49,584; Referee: Pieri

13 May 1984 30	Udinese	1–2	Milan	Udine
	Virdis 40'	Report	15' (o.g.) Cattaneo; 38' Battistini	Stadium: Stadio Friuli; Attendance: 48,384; Referee: Testa

=== Coppa Italia ===
==== Group stage ====
Group 5
Pos	Team	Pld	W	D	L	GF	GA	GD	Pts
1	Roma	5	4	1	0	11	4	+7	9
2	Milan	5	3	2	0	8	2	+6	8
3	Rimini	5	2	1	2	8	8	0	5
4	Atalanta	5	1	2	2	5	7	−2	4
5	Arezzo	5	0	3	2	2	5	−3	3
6	Padova	5	0	1	4	3	11	−8	1

Source: https://www.rsssf.org/tablesi/italcup84.html

==== Matches ====
===== Group stage =====
21 August 1983 1	Arezzo	0–0	Milan	Arezzo
				Stadium: Stadio Comunale; Attendance: 10,228; Referee: Paparesta

24 August 1983 2	Padova	0–2	Milan	Padua
			16', 63' Damiani	Stadium: Stadio Silvio Appiani; Attendance: 25,000; Referee: Redini

28 August 1983 3	Milan	3–1	Rimini	Milan
	Battistini 8'; Damiani 35', 80'		16' Nicassio	Stadium: Stadio Giuseppe Meazza; Attendance: 30,000; Referee: Pezzella

31 August 1983 4	Atalanta	0–2	Milan	Como
			27' (pen.) Baresi; 55' Carotti	Stadium: Stadio Giuseppe Sinigaglia; Attendance: 15,000; Referee: D'Elia

4 September 1983 5	Milan	1–1	Roma	Milan
	Battistini 32'		22' Vincenzi	Stadium: Stadio Giuseppe Meazza; Attendance: 63,899; Referee: Menicucci

===== Round of 16 =====
8 February 1984 1	Lanerossi Vicenza	0–1	Milan	Vicenza
			59' Carotti	Stadium: Stadio Romeo Menti; Attendance: 14,470; Referee: Paparesta

22 February 1984 2	Milan	2–1	Lanerossi Vicenza	Milan
	Blissett 43'; Baresi 65' (pen.)		76' Grop	Stadium: Stadio Giuseppe Meazza; Attendance: 5,000; Referee: Angelelli

===== Quarter-finals =====
7 June 1984 1	Roma	1–1	Milan	Rome
	Di Bartolomei 54' (pen.)		48' (o.g.) Nappi	Stadium: Stadio Olimpico; Attendance: 67,500; Referee: Lo Bello

10 June 1984 2	Milan	1–2 (a.e.t.)	Roma	Milan
	Carotti 33'		2', 93' Cerezo	Stadium: Stadio Giuseppe Meazza; Attendance: 65,000; Referee: Redini

== Statistics ==
=== Squad statistics ===
Competition	Points	Home						Away						Total						GD
Competition	Points	G	W	D	L	Gs	Ga	G	W	D	L	Gs	Ga	G	W	D	L	Gs	Ga	GD
1983-84 Serie A	32	15	7	5	3	22	18	15	3	7	5	15	22	30	10	12	8	37	40	-3
1983-84 Coppa Italia	-	4	2	1	1	7	5	5	3	2	0	6	1	9	5	3	1	13	6	+7
Total	-	19	9	6	4	29	23	20	6	9	5	21	23	39	15	15	9	50	46	+4

=== Players statistics ===
No.	Pos	Nat	Player	Total		1983-84 Serie A		1983-84 Coppa Italia	
No.	Pos	Nat	Player	Apps	Goals	Apps	Goals	Apps	Goals
	GK	(Italy) ITA	Piotti	27	-29	25	-28	2	-1
	DF	(Italy) ITA	Tassotti	37	1	30	1	7	0
	DF	(Italy) ITA	Baresi	30	5	21	3	9	2
	DF	(Italy) ITA	Galli	36	1	26+2	1	8	0
	DF	(Italy) ITA	Battistini	35	7	29	5	6	2
	MF	(Italy) ITA	Verza	35	4	27	4	8	0
	MF	(Italy) ITA	Icardi	32	1	23+1	1	8	0
	MF	(Italy) ITA	Carotti	34	8	17+9	5	8	3
	MF	(Italy) ITA	Evani	33	2	28	2	5	0
	FW	(Italy) ITA	Damiani	35	11	22+4	7	9	4
	FW	(England) ENG	Blissett	39	6	30	5	9	1
	GK	(Italy) ITA	Nuciari	12	-17	5	-12	7	-5
	DF	(Italy) ITA	Spinosi	24	0	15+3	0	6	0
	DF	(Italy) ITA	Cimmino	3	0	1+2	0	0	0
	DF	(Belgium) BEL	Eric Gerets	20	1	13	1	7	0
	DF	(Italy) ITA	Tacconi	19	0	9+4	0	6	0
	FW	(Italy) ITA	Incocciati	21	0	7+9	0	5	0
	MF	(Italy) ITA	Manzo	13	0	2+5	0	6	0
	DF	(Italy) ITA	Russo	3	0	1+2	0	0	0
	MF	(Italy) ITA	Paciocco	4	0	0+2	0	2	0
	FW	(Italy) ITA	Valori	1	0	0+1	0	0	0

== See also ==
- "Almanacco illustrato del Milan" (2 ed.). Panini. Panini. 2005.
