= 1982–83 AC Milan season =

Milan Associazione Calcio
1982–83 season
- Owner: Giuseppe Farina
- President: Giuseppe Farina
- Manager: Ilario Castagner
- Stadium: San Siro
- Serie B: 1st (promoted to Serie A)
- Coppa Italia: Quarter-finals
- Top goalscorer: League: Battistini (11); All: Jordan, Serena (14)
- Average home league attendance: 35,111
Home colours	Away colours

During the 1982–83 season Milan Associazione Calcio competed in Serie B and Coppa Italia.

== Summary ==
In 1982–83, Milan faced their second season in Serie B. The new coach was Ilario Castagner. The squad was revolutionized: five pillars of the Stella title left: Walter Novellino (moving to Ascoli), Aldo Maldera (to Roma), Roberto Antonelli (Genoa), Ruben Buriani (Cesena), as well as Fulvio Collovati, sold by his will to Inter, obtaining in exchange the loans of Giancarlo Pasinato, Nazzareno Canuti and Aldo Serena. Other signings were Vinicio Verza (from Cesena), Oscar Damiani (from Napoli) and Tiziano Manfrin (from Genoa), as well as goalkeeper Giulio Nuciari and Maurizio D'Este. Milan path to the promotion was relatively comfortable, losing only three matches and spending the entire season in the top two spots of the table, in an interesting duel against Lazio, which in the end was left eight points behind.

Milan game proved decidedly more pleasant than in the previous two seasons. Coach Castagner played an attacking football, remarked by the thirteen different players who scored at least one goal. Franco Baresi, only 22 years old, obtained the captaincy of the club, which he will retain until his retirement 15 years later. Also in the Coppa Italia Milan gave good impressions, reaching the quarter-finals where they were eliminated on away goals by Verona.

== Squad ==
Note: Flags indicate national team as defined under FIFA eligibility rules; some limited exceptions apply. Players may hold more than one non-FIFA nationality.

Pos.	Nation	Player
GK	ITA	Francesco Alberti
GK	ITA	Giulio Nuciari
GK	ITA	Ottorino Piotti
DF	ITA	Franco Baresi
DF	ITA	Paolo Benetti
DF	ITA	Roberto Biffi
DF	ITA	Nazareno Canuti
MF	ITA	Andrea Icardi
DF	ITA	Maurizio Longobardo
DF	ITA	Mauro Tassotti
MF	ITA	Sergio Battistini
MF	ITA	Stefano Cuoghi

Pos.	Nation	Player
MF	ITA	Alberico Evani
MF	ITA	Massimo Gadda
MF	ITA	Tiziano Manfrin
MF	ITA	Giancarlo Pasinato
MF	ITA	Francesco Romano
MF	ITA	Vinicio Verza
FW	ITA	Alberto Cambiaghi
FW	ITA	Oscar Damiani
FW	ITA	Maurizio D'Este
FW	ITA	Giuseppe Incocciati
FW	SCO	Joe Jordan
FW	ITA	Aldo Serena

=== Transfers ===
In
Pos.	Name	from	Type
GK	Giulio Nuciari	Ternana	
DF	Nazareno Canuti	Inter	loan
DF	Maurizio Longobardo	Reggina	loan ended
MF	Tiziano Manfrin	Genoa	
MF	Giancarlo Pasinato	Inter	loan
MF	Vinicio Verza	Cesena	
FW	Oscar Damiani	Napoli	
FW	Maurizio D'Este	VJS Velletri	
FW	Aldo Serena	Inter	loan
FW	Roberto Mandressi	Pescara	loan ended

Out
Pos.	Name	To	Type
GK	Roberto Incontri	Ternana	
DF	Fulvio Collovati	Inter	loan
DF	Aldo Maldera	Roma	
DF	Alberto Minoia	Sanbenedettese	
DF	Maurizio Venturi	Palermo	
MF	Ruben Buriani	Cesena	
MF	Adelio Moro	Cesena	
MF	Walter Novellino	Ascoli	
FW	Roberto Antonelli	Genoa	
FW	Roberto Mandressi	Pescara	loan
FW	Fabio Valente	Sant'Angelo	loan
FW	Alberto Cambiaghi	Brescia	loan
FW	Roberto Mandressi	Piacenza	

== Competitions ==
=== Serie B ===
==== Results by round ====
Round	1	2	3	4	5	6	7	8	9	10	11	12	13	14	15	16	17	18	19	20	21	22	23	24	25	26	27	28	29	30	31	32	33	34	35	36	37	38
Ground	H	A	H	A	H	A	H	A	H	H	A	H	A	H	A	H	A	A	H	A	H	A	H	A	H	A	H	A	A	H	A	H	A	H	A	H	H	A
Result	D	D	W	W	W	W	W	D	L	W	D	W	L	W	D	W	D	D	W	D	D	D	D	W	W	W	W	D	D	D	L	W	D	W	W	W	W	D
Position	6	7	5	1	1	1	1	1	1	1	2	2	2	2	2	2	2	2	2	1	1	1	1	1	1	1	1	1	1	1	1	1	1	1	1	1	1	1

Source: Competitive matches
A = Away; H = Home; W = Win; D = Draw; L = Loss; = Leader, Promoted to 1983–84 Serie A; = Promoted to 1983–84 Serie A; = Relegated to 1983–84 Serie C1

==== Matches ====
12 September 1982 1	Milan	2–2	Sambenedettese	Milan
	Serena 29'; Verza 31'	Report	33' Colasanto; 57' Rossinelli	Stadium: San Siro; Attendance: 28,733; Referee: Vitali

19 September 1982 2	Catania	1–1	Milan	Catania
	Mastalli 59' (pen.)	Report	52' (pen.) Baresi	Stadium: Stadio Cibali; Attendance: 20,000; Referee: Menegali

26 September 1982 3	Milan	2–1	Arezzo	Milan
	Damiani 35'; Romano 59'	Report	73' Sartori	Stadium: San Siro; Attendance: 24,961; Referee: Pezzella

3 October 1982 4	Campobasso	0–2	Milan	Campobasso
		Report	48' Jordan; 74' Cuoghi	Stadium: Stadio Giovanni Romagnoli; Attendance: 17,111; Referee: Lo Bello

10 October 1982 5	Milan	3–1	Bari	Milan
	Damiani 42'; Incocciati 71'; Jordan 76'		27' Bresciani	Stadium: San Siro; Attendance: 39,124; Referee: Barbaresco

17 October 1982 6	Monza	1–4	Milan	Monza
	Pradella 27'		7', 14' Jordan; 64' Pasinato; 89' Serena	Stadium: Stadio Gino Alfonso Sada; Attendance: 10,842; Referee: Patrussi

24 October 1982 7	Milan	5–0	Bologna	Milan
	Jordan 33', 55'; Cuoghi 64'; Battistini 71'; Serena 78'			Stadium: San Siro; Attendance: 35,455; Referee: Pairetto

31 October 1982 8	Varese	0–0	Milan	Varese
				Stadium: Stadio Franco Ossola; Attendance: 15,000; Referee: Bergamo

7 November 1982 9	Milan	1–2	Cavese	Milan
	Jordan 23'		26' Tivelli; 55' Di Michele	Stadium: San Siro; Attendance: 37,822; Referee: Falzier

14 November 1982 10	Milan	2–0	Foggia	Milan
	Battistini 40'; Romano 59'			Stadium: San Siro; Attendance: 36,269; Referee: Lanese

21 November 1982 11	Cremonese	3–3	Milan	Cremona
	Ferri 12'; Frutti 20'; Paolinelli 57'		13' Serena; 33' Pasinato; 71' (pen.) Baresi	Stadium: Stadio Giovanni Zini; Attendance: 16,274; Referee: Longhi

28 November 1982 12	Milan	2–1	Perugia	Milan
	Battistini 62'; Zagano 86' (o.g.)		70' (o.g.) Canuti	Stadium: San Siro; Attendance: 26,108; Referee: Pairetto

5 December 1982 13	Como	1–0	Milan	Como
	Palanca 52'			Stadium: Stadio Giuseppe Sinigaglia; Attendance: 19,944; Referee: Ballerini

12 December 1982 14	Milan	2–0	Palermo	Milan
	Battistini 62'; Damiani 81'			Stadium: San Siro; Attendance: 32,073; Referee: Esposito

19 December 1982 15	Lazio	2–2	Milan	Rome
	Giordano 43'; D'Amico 89'		9', 57' Damiani	Stadium: Stadio Olimpico; Attendance: 65,850; Referee: Agnolin

2 January 1983 16	Milan	3–0	Reggiana	Milan
	Verza 38', 81'; Jordan 47'			Stadium: San Siro; Attendance: 37,201; Referee: Pirandola

9 January 1983 17	Lecce	1–1	Milan	Lecce
	Orlandi 40' (pen.)		11' Icardi	Stadium: Stadio Via del Mare; Attendance: 27,658; Referee: Barbaresco

16 January 1983 18	Atalanta	2–2	Milan	Bergamo
	Pacione 15'; Magrin 50'		54' (pen.) Baresi; 81' Damiani	Stadium: Stadio Comunale; Attendance: 32,523; Referee: Menicucci

23 January 1983 19	Milan	2–1	Pistoiese	Milan
	Jordan 25'; Damiani 48'		83' Parlanti	Stadium: San Siro; Attendance: 32,336; Referee: Lo Bello

30 January 1983 20	Sambenedettese	1–1	Milan	San Benedetto del Tronto
	Gentilini 18'		9' Pasinato	Stadium: Stadio Fratelli Ballarin; Attendance: 12,142; Referee: Pieri

13 February 1983 21	Milan	0–0	Catania	Milan
				Stadium: San Siro; Attendance: 34,386; Referee: D'Elia

20 February 1983 22	Arezzo	2–2	Milan	Arezzo
	Tassotti 9' (o.g.); Traini 49'		7' Battistini; 31' Pasinato	Stadium: Stadio Comunale; Attendance: 19,255; Referee: Altobelli

27 February 1983 23	Milan	0–0	Campobasso	Milan
				Stadium: San Siro; Attendance: 23,076; Referee: Patrussi

6 March 1983 24	Bari	1–4	Milan	Bari
	De Trizio 83'		60' Verza; 66' Damiani; 69' Pasinato; 85' Incocciati	Stadium: Stadio della Vittoria; Attendance: 29,552; Referee: Mattei

13 March 1983 25	Milan	4–0	Monza	Milan
	Verza 15'; Jordan 21'; Damiani 34'; Battistini 44'			Stadium: San Siro; Attendance: 38,770; Referee: Lombardo

20 March 1983 26	Bologna	1–3	Milan	Bologna
	Tassotti 90' (o.g.)		25' Pasinato; 46' Verza; 67' (pen.) Baresi	Stadium: Stadio Comunale; Attendance: 47,619; Referee: Pieri

27 March 1983 27	Milan	3–0	Varese	Milan
	Verza 14', 28', 38'			Stadium: San Siro; Attendance: 45,031; Referee: Angelelli

2 April 1983 28	Cavese	2–2	Milan	Cava de' Tirreni
	Tivelli 42'; Caffarelli 70'		20' Verza; 28' Battistini	Stadium: Stadio Comunale; Attendance: 15,000; Referee: Redini

10 April 1983 29	Foggia	1–1	Milan	Foggia
	Maritozzi 5'		36' Incocciati	Stadium: Stadio Pino Zaccheria; Attendance: 18,000; Referee: Longhi

17 April 1983 30	Milan	1–1	Cremonese	Milan
	Battistini 23'		60' Bonomi	Stadium: San Siro; Attendance: 50,170; Referee: Pairetto

24 April 1983 31	Perugia	3–2	Milan	Perugia
	Amenta 8' (rig); Pagliari 28', 65'		13' Serena; 63' Gadda	Stadium: Stadio Renato Curi; Attendance: 26,000; Referee: Ballerini

1º May 1983 32	Milan	2–0	Como	Milan
	D'Este 33'; Serena 81'			Stadium: San Siro; Attendance: 31,275; Referee: Redini

8 May 1983 33	Palermo	0–0	Milan	Palermo
				Stadium: Stadio La Favorita; Attendance: 28,000; Referee: Mattei

15 May 1983 34	Milan	5–1	Lazio	Milan
	Serena 23', 77'; Miele 26' (o.g.); Pasinato 59'; Damiani 86'		64' Giordano	Stadium: San Siro; Attendance: 63,000; Referee: Barbaresco

22 May 1983 35	Reggiana	2–3	Milan	Reggio Emilia
	Graziani 26'; Tassotti 68' (o.g.)		11' Battistini; 33' Incocciati; 42' Icardi	Stadium: Stadio comunale Mirabello; Attendance: 18,464; Referee: Menegali

29 May 1983 36	Milan	4–2	Lecce	Milan
	Battistini 43'; Cannito 56' (o.g.); Incocciati 67', 72'		78' Spica; 83' Luperto	Stadium: San Siro; Attendance: 27,000; Referee: Pieri

5 June 1983 37	Milan	1–0	Atalanta	Milan
	Battistini 40'			Stadium: San Siro; Attendance: 26,106; Referee: Testa

12 June 1983 38	Pistoiese	0–0	Milan	Pistoia
				Stadium: Stadio Comunale; Attendance: 18,000; Referee: Altobelli

=== Coppa Italia ===
==== Group stage ====
Group 6
Pos	Team	Pld	W	D	L	GF	GA	GD	Pts
1	Juventus	5	3	2	0	10	7	+3	8
2	Milan	5	3	1	1	8	6	+2	7
3	Catania	5	2	2	1	6	5	+1	6
4	Pescara	5	0	4	1	6	7	−1	4
5	Padova	5	0	3	2	4	6	−2	3
6	Genoa	5	0	2	3	8	11	−3	2

==== Matches ====
===== Group stage =====
18 August 1982 1	Pescara	1–1	Milan	Pescara
	Lombardi 57'		21' Verza	Stadium: Stadio Adriatico; Attendance: 22,000; Referee: Angelelli

22 August 1982 2	Padova	0–1	Milan	Padua
			28' Tassotti	Stadium: Stadio Silvio Appiani; Attendance: 20,000; Referee: Ballerini

29 August 1982 3	Milan	2–1	Catania	Piacenza
	Jordan 44'; Serena 49'		42' (pen.) Mastalli	Stadium: Stadio Galleana; Attendance: 15,000; Referee: Mattei

1º September 1982 4	Juventus	2–1	Milan	Turin
	Rossi 21', 68'		72' Jordan	Stadium: Stadio Comunale Vittorio Pozzo; Attendance: 51,524; Referee: Bergamo

5 September 1982 5	Milan	3–2	Genoa	Milan
	Jordan 43'; Serena 67', 72'		1' (o.g.) Tassotti; 22' Vandereycken	Stadium: Stadio Giuseppe Meazza; Attendance: 50,000; Referee: Agnolin

===== Round of 16 =====
6 April 1983 1	Cagliari	1–2	Milan	Cagliari
	Baresi 61' (o.g.)		2', 89' Serena	Stadium: Stadio Sant'Elia; Attendance: 21,102; Referee: Altobelli

13 April 1983 2	Milan	4–2	Cagliari	Milan
	Verza 28'; Baresi 32' (pen.); Damiani 61'; Bogoni 73' (o.g.)		40' Quagliozzi; 76' (o.g.) Baresi	Stadium: Stadio Giuseppe Meazza; Attendance: 53,423; Referee: Facchin

===== Quarter-finals =====
18 May 1983 1	Hellas Verona	2–2	Milan	Verona
	Penzo 5'; Volpati 58'		37' Battistini; 53' Serena	Stadium: Stadio Marcantonio Bentegodi; Attendance: 35,960; Referee: Menicucci

1º June 1983 2	Milan	3–3	Hellas Verona	Milan
	Baresi 12' (pen.); Jordan 54'; Damiani 33'		41' Tricella; 62' Dirceu; 89' Penzo	Stadium: Stadio Giuseppe Meazza; Attendance: 68,374; Referee: Mattei

== Statistics ==
=== Squad statistics ===
Competition	Points	Home						Away						Total						GD
Competition	Points	G	W	D	L	Gs	Ga	G	W	D	L	Gs	Ga	G	W	D	L	Gs	Ga	GD
1982-83 Serie B	54	19	14	4	1	44	12	19	5	12	2	33	24	38	19	16	3	77	36	+41
1982-83 Coppa Italia	–	4	3	1	0	12	8	5	2	2	1	7	6	9	5	3	1	19	14	+5
Total	–	23	22	15	4	56	20	24	7	14	3	40	30	47	24	19	4	96	50	+46

=== Players statistics ===
No.	Pos	Nat	Player	Total		Serie B		Coppa	
No.	Pos	Nat	Player	Apps	Goals	Apps	Goals	Apps	Goals
	GK	(Italy) ITA	Piotti	25	-26	20	-20	5	-6
	DF	(Italy) ITA	Tassotti	39	1	30	0	9	1
	DF	(Italy) ITA	Baresi	39	6	30	4	9	2
	DF	(Italy) ITA	Battistini	46	12	37	11	9	1
	DF	(Italy) ITA	Canuti	39	0	31	0	8	0
	MF	(Italy) ITA	Verza	40	12	30+1	10	9	2
	MF	(Italy) ITA	Pasinato	42	7	33	7	9	0
	MF	(Italy) ITA	Icardi	38	2	25+5	2	8	0
	MF	(Italy) ITA	Evani	41	0	34+1	0	6	0
	FW	(Scotland) SCO	Jordan	36	14	29+1	10	6	4
	FW	(Italy) ITA	Damiani	33	12	22+5	10	6	2
	GK	(Italy) ITA	Nuciari	22	-24	18	-16	4	-8
	MF	(Italy) ITA	Cuoghi	31	2	21+8	2	2	0
	FW	(Italy) ITA	Serena	29	14	16+4	8	9	6
	FW	(Italy) ITA	Incocciati	37	6	12+19	6	6	0
	MF	(Italy) ITA	Romano	23	2	12+6	2	5	0
	MF	(Italy) ITA	Manfrin	24	0	9+8	0	7	0
	DF	(Italy) ITA	Biffi	4	0	4	0	0	0
	DF	(Italy) ITA	Longobardo	4	0	1+2	0	1	0
	DF	(Italy) ITA	Benetti	1	0	1	0	0	0
	MF	(Italy) ITA	D'Este	1	1	1	1	0	0
	MF	(Italy) ITA	Gadda	4	1	0+4	1	0	0
	MF	(Italy) ITA	Cambiaghi	0	0	0	0	0	0
	MF	(Italy) ITA	Alberti	0	0	0	0	0	0

== See also ==
- "Almanacco illustrato del Milan" (2 ed.). Panini. Panini. 2005.
