= 1984–85 AC Milan season =

Milan
1984–85 season
- Owner: Giuseppe Farina
- President: Giuseppe Farina
- Manager: Nils Liedholm
- Stadium: San Siro
- Serie A: 5th
- Coppa Italia: Runners-up
- Top goalscorer: League: Pietro Paolo Virdis (9); All: Pietro Paolo Virdis (13)
- Average home league attendance: 60,941
Home colours	Away colours

During the 1984–85 season, Milan Associazione Calcio competed in Serie A and Coppa Italia.

== Summary ==
In the summer of 1984, president Giuseppe Farina hired coach Nils Liedholm, who got to the Milan five years after the tenth scudetto, fresh from the triumphs obtained with Roma: it was the third time that the Swede was appointed coach of the Rossoneri, after having been at the helm of Milan from 1963 to 1966, and again from 1977 to 1979. As far as the transfer market is concerned, Farina signed strikers Pietro Paolo Virdis and Mark Hateley. In addition, the Manchester United playmaker Ray Wilkins, the sweeper Agostino Di Bartolomei from Roma and the goalkeeper Giuliano Terraneo. The 3 signings of the previous year start, Blissett, Gerets and Spinosi, all left the club.

In Serie A, Milan started with a series of 7 consecutive positive results (three wins and four draws), even winning a derby for the first time in six years thanks to a header by English new signing Hateley. After the victory in the derby came the first defeat of the season, by Torino; Milan finished the first half of the season in 6th place, on equal points (17) with Juventus. Even at the beginning of the second round Milan achieved 7 consecutive games without losing, interrupted again by the defeat against Torino, and continued to remain in the upper areas of the standings.

At the end of the championship the Rossoneri finished in 5th place in the standings with 36 points, still tied with Juventus, but ahead of the black and whites thanks to the wins in face-to-face matches: 3–2 and 1–1). This result allowed Milan to qualify to the 1985–86 UEFA Cup.

During the competition, on 20 January 1985, in Udine, Paolo Maldini, son of Cesare, made his debut for Milan. In the coming years he would become captain of the club, setting the overall record for most appearances with the red and black shirt.

In the Coppa Italia, AC Milan got through the first round finishing their group in the first place, with 7 points, thanks to victories against Parma and Carrarese and draws with Brescia, Como and Triestina. In the round of 16, Milan eliminated Napoli (2–1 at San Siro and 1–1 at San Paolo), in the quarter-finals Juventus, who had recently become European champions (0–0 in Milan and 0–1 in Turin) and in the semifinals Inter (2–1 victory in the first leg and 1–1 draw in the second leg). Having reached their seventh final, Milan faced Sampdoria who, by beating the Rossoneri both in the first leg in Milan (1–0) and in the return leg in Genoa (2–1), won the trophy for the first time.

== Squad ==
=== Goalkeepers ===
- (Italy) Giulio Nuciari
- (Italy) Giuliano Terraneo
- (Italy) Ottorino Piotti

=== Defenders ===
- (Italy) Franco Baresi
- (Italy) Fabio Casiraghi
- (Italy) Catello Cimmino
- (Italy) Filippo Galli
- (Italy) Paolo Maldini
- (Italy) Luigi Russo
- (Italy) Mauro Tassotti

=== Midfielders ===
- (Italy) Sergio Battistini
- (Italy) Gabriello Carotti
- (Italy) Agostino Di Bartolomei
- (Italy) Alberigo Evani
- (Italy) Massimo Gadda
- (Italy) Andrea Icardi
- (Italy) Andrea Manzo
- (Italy) Roberto Scarnecchia
- (Italy) Vinicio Verza
- (England) Ray Wilkins

=== Attackers ===
- (Italy) Pietro Paolo Virdis
- (England) Mark Hateley
- (Italy) Giuseppe Incocciati
- (Italy) Salvatore Giunta
- (Italy) Paolo Valori

=== Transfers ===
In
Pos.	Name	from	Type
GK	Giuliano Terraneo	Torino	
DF	Fabio Casiraghi	Sant'Angelo	loan end
MF	Agostino Di Bartolomei	Roma	
MF	Massimo Gadda	Reggiana	loan end
MF	Ray Wilkins	Manchester United	
MF	Roberto Scarnecchia	Pisa	
FW	Alberto Cambiaghi	Treviso	loan end
FW	Mark Hateley	Portsmouth	
FW	Pietro Paolo Virdis	Udinese	

Out
Pos.	Name	To	Type
DF	Eric Gerets	MVV	
DF	Luciano Spinosi	Cesena	
MF	Daniele Tacconi	Monza	
FW	Luther Blissett	Watford	
FW	Alberto Cambiaghi	Reggiana	loan
FW	Oscar Damiani	New York Cosmos	
GK	Ottorino Piotti	Atalanta	
DF	Fabio Casiraghi	Pistoiese	
MF	Massimo Gadda	Reggiana	loan
FW	Paolo Valori	Casarano	

== Competitions ==
=== Serie A ===
==== League table ====
Pos	Team	Pld	W	D	L	GF	GA	GD	Pts	Qualification or relegation
3	Internazionale	30	13	12	5	42	28	+14	38	Qualification to UEFA Cup
4	Sampdoria	30	12	13	5	36	21	+15	37	Qualification to Cup Winners' Cup
5	Milan	30	12	12	6	31	25	+6	36 (Note: Position defined by head-to-head points: Milan: 3 pts; Juventus: 1 pt.)	Qualification to UEFA Cup
6	Juventus (Note: Juventus gained entry to the 1985–86 European Cup as defending champions.)	30	11	14	5	48	33	+15	36	Qualification to European Cup
7	Roma	30	10	14	6	33	25	+8	34	

Source: RSSSF.com
Rules for classification: 1) Points; 2) Head-to-head points; 3) Head-to-head goal difference; 4) Goal difference; 5) Goals scored; 6) Draw. (Note: Head-to-head record is used only after all the matches between the teams in question have been played).

==== Matches ====
16 September 1984 1	Milan	2–2	Udinese	Milan
	Virdis 19'; Hateley 61'		Gerolin 13'; Carnevale 73'	Stadium: San Siro

23 September 1984 2	Fiorentina	0–0	Milan	Florence

30 September 1984 3	Milan	2–1	Cremonese	Milan
	Hateley 51', 58'		Nicoletti 39'	Stadium: San Siro

7 October 1984 4	Juventus	1–1	Milan	Turin
	Briaschi 32'		Virdis 85'	Stadium: Comunale

14 October 1984 5	Milan	2–1	Roma	Milan
	Di Bartolomei 58'; Hateley 64'		Cerezo 70'	Stadium: San Siro

21 October 1984 6	Napoli	0–0	Milan	Naples
				Stadium: San Paolo

28 October 1984 7	Milan	2–1	Inter	Milan
	Di Bartolomei 33'; Hateley 64'		Altobelli 10'	Stadium: San Siro

11 November 1984 8	Torino	2–0	Milan	Turin
	Schachner 80'; Júnior 88'			Stadium: Comunale

18 November 1984 9	Avellino	0–0	Milan	Avellino

25 November 1984 10	Milan	0–1	Sampdoria	Milan
			Francis 64' (pen.)	Stadium: San Siro

2 December 1984 11	Verona	0–0	Milan	Verona

16 December 1984 12	Milan	2–2	Atalanta	Milan
	Battistini 16'; Virdis 32'		Strömberg 67'; Gentile 87'	Stadium: San Siro

23 December 1984 13	Ascoli	0–1	Milan	Ascoli Piceno
			Tassotti 88'	Stadium: Cino e Lillo de Luca

7 January 1985 14	Lazio	0–1	Milan	Rome
			Virdis 21'	Stadium: Olimpico

13 January 1985 15	Milan	0–2	Como	Milan
			Matteoli 25'; Bruno 40'	Stadium: San Siro

20 January 1985 16	Udinese	1–1	Milan	Udine
	Selvaggi 10'		Hateley 63'	Stadium: Friuli

27 January 1985 17	Milan	1–1	Fiorentina	Milan
	Hateley 66'		Monelli 11'	Stadium: San Siro

10 February 1985 18	Cremonese	0–1	Milan	Cremona
			Di Bartolomei 90' (pen.)

17 February 1985 19	Milan	3–2	Juventus	Milan
	Virdis 3', 39'; Di Bartolomei 46' (pen.)		Platini 12' (pen.); Rossi 30'	Stadium: San Siro

24 February 1985 20	Roma	0–1	Milan	Rome
			Virdis 12'	Stadium: Olimpico

3 March 1985 21	Milan	2–1	Napoli	Milan
	Battistini 15'; Incocciati 68'		Wilkins 35' (o.g.)	Stadium: San Siro

17 March 1985 22	Inter	2–2	Milan	Milan
	Rummenigge 48'; Altobelli 81'		Virdis 22'; Verza 85'	Stadium: Giuseppe Meazza

24 March 1985 23	Milan	0–1	Torino	Milan
			Schachner 61'	Stadium: San Siro

31 March 1985 24	Milan	2–0	Avellino	Milan
	Di Bartolomei 20' (pen.), 78'			Stadium: San Siro

14 April 1985 25	Sampdoria	2–1	Milan	Genoa
	Vierchowod 40'; Souness 72'		Battistini 83'	Stadium: Luigi Ferraris

21 April 1985 26	Milan	0–0	Verona	Milan
				Stadium: San Siro

28 April 1985 27	Atalanta	1–0	Milan	Bergamo
	Magrin 83'			Stadium: Atleti Azzurri d'Italia

5 May 1985 28	Milan	2–1	Ascoli	Milan
	Battistini 1'; Incocciati 37'		Nicolini 47' (pen.)	Stadium: San Siro

12 May 1985 29	Milan	2–0	Lazio	Milan
	Virdis 16'; Battistini 40'			Stadium: San Siro

19 May 1985 30	Como	0–0	Milan	Como

==== Topscorers ====
- (Italy) Pietro Paolo Virdis 9
- (England) Mark Hateley 7
- (Italy) Agostino Di Bartolomei 6
- (Italy) Sergio Battistini 5

=== Coppa Italia ===
First Round

22 August 1984 1	Parma	1–2	Milan	Parma
	Aselli 10'		15' (pen.) Di Bartolomei; 43' Hateley	Stadium: Ennio Tardini; Attendance: 15 050; Referee: Pairetto

26 August 1984 2	Milan	1–1	Brescia	Milan
	Di Bartolomei 64' (pen.)		22' (o.g.) Galli	Stadium: San Siro; Attendance: 45 000; Referee: Pellicanò

29 August 1984 3	Carrarese	0–2	Milan	Carrara
			72' (o.g.) Rossi; 84' Virdis	Stadium: Stadio dei Marmi; Attendance: 18 000; Referee: Paparesta

2 September 1984 4	Milan	1–1	Como	Milan
	Battistini 53'		74' Todesco	Stadium: San Siro; Attendance: 40 000; Referee: Baldi

9 September 1984 5	Triestina	0–0	Milan	Trieste
				Stadium: Stadio Giuseppe Grezar; Attendance: 15 565; Referee: Lanese

Eightfinals

13 February 1985	Milan	2–1	Napoli	Milan
	Battistini 14'; Di Bartolomei 51' (pen.)		46' Bagni	Stadium: Stadio San Siro; Attendance: 35 000; Referee: Mattei

27 February 1985	Napoli	1–1	Milan	Naples
	Caffarelli 78'		40' Battistini	Stadium: San Paolo; Attendance: 75 012; Referee: Baldi

Quarterfinals

12 June 1985	Milan	0–0	Juventus	Milan
				Stadium: San Siro; Attendance: 43 548; Referee: Pieri

19 June 1985	Juventus	0–1	Milan	Turin
			27' Virdis	Stadium: Comunale; Attendance: 10 000; Referee: Lo Bello

Semifinals

23 June 1985	Internazionale	1–2	Milan	Empoli
	Rummenigge 25'		30' Virdis; 85' Icardi	Stadium: Stadio Carlo Castellani; Attendance: 45 886; Referee: Mattei

26 June 1985	Milan	1–1	Internazionale	Milan
	Scarnecchia 77'		54' (pen.) Brady	Stadium: San Siro; Attendance: 69 735; Referee: D'Elia

==== Final ====
30 June 1985
20:30

Milan	0–1	Sampdoria
		Souness 24'

San Siro, Milan
Attendance: 40,000
Referee: Giancarlo Redini
3 July 1985
20:30

Sampdoria	2–1	Milan
Mancini 41' (pen.); Vialli 61'		Virdis 66'

Stadio Luigi Ferraris, Genoa
Attendance: 42,043
Referee: Luigi Agnolin

== Statistics ==
=== Squad statistics ===
Competition	Points	Home						Away						Total						GD
Competition	Points	G	W	D	L	Gs	Ga	G	W	D	L	Gs	Ga	G	W	D	L	Gs	Ga	GD
1984-85 Serie A	36	15	8	4	3	22	16	15	4	8	3	9	9	30	12	12	6	31	25	+6
1984-85 Coppa Italia	–	6	1	4	1	5	5	7	4	2	1	9	5	13	5	6	2	14	10	+4
Total	–	21	9	8	4	27	21	22	8	10	4	18	14	43	17	18	8	45	35	+10

=== Players statistics ===
No.	Pos	Nat	Player	Total		1984-85 Serie A		1984-85 Coppa Italia	
No.	Pos	Nat	Player	Apps	Goals	Apps	Goals	Apps	Goals
	GK	(Italy) ITA	Terraneo	43	-35	30	-25	13	-10
	DF	(Italy) ITA	Tassotti	34	1	24	1	10	0
	DF	(Italy) ITA	Baresi	36	0	26	0	10	0
	DF	(Italy) ITA	Battistini	40	8	29	5	11	3
	DF	(Italy) ITA	Galli	38	0	28	0	10	0
	MF	(Italy) ITA	Verza	31	1	23	1	8	0
	MF	(Italy) ITA	Di Bartolomei	41	9	29	6	12	3
	MF	(England) ENG	Wilkins	40	0	28	0	12	0
	MF	(Italy) ITA	Evani	37	0	26+1	0	10	0
	FW	(England) ENG	Hateley	28	8	21	7	7	1
	FW	(Italy) ITA	Virdis	40	13	28	9	12	4
	GK	(Italy) ITA	Nuciari	0	0	0	0	0	0
	MF	(Italy) ITA	Icardi	26	1	15+2	0	9	1
	FW	(Italy) ITA	Incocciati	21	2	8+5	2	8	0
	FW	(Italy) ITA	Scarnecchia	18	1	8+3	0	7	1
	MF	(Italy) ITA	Manzo	10	0	4+3	0	3	0
	DF	(Italy) ITA	Russo	11	0	3+3	0	5	0
	DF	(Italy) ITA	Maldini	1	0	0+1	0	0	0
	MF	(Italy) ITA	Giunta	1	0	0+1	0	0	0
	DF	(Italy) ITA	Casiraghi	1	0	0	0	1	0
	DF	(Italy) ITA	Cimmino	0	0	0	0	0	0
	DF	(Italy) ITA	Ferrari	0	0	0	0	0	0
	MF	(Italy) ITA	Carotti	5	0	0	0	5	0
	MF	(Italy) ITA	Gadda	0	0	0	0	0	0
	FW	(Italy) ITA	Valori	0	0	0	0	0	0
	GK	(Italy) ITA	Piotti	0	0	0	0	0	0

== Sources ==
- RSSSF – Italy 1984/85
