= 1980–81 AC Milan season =

Milan Associazione Calcio
1980–81 season
- Owner: Felice Colombo
- President: Gaetano Morazzoni
- Manager: Massimo Giacomini (until 15 June 1981); Italo Galbiati
- Stadium: San Siro
- Serie B: 1st (promoted to Serie A)
- Coppa Italia: First round
- Top goalscorer: League: Antonelli (15); All: Antonelli (15)
- Average home league attendance: 31,282
Home colours	Away colours

During the 1980–81 season Milan Associazione Calcio competed in Coppa Italia and for the first time ever in Serie B.

== Summary ==
Owing to Totonero sentences and after appeals, owner Felice Colombo appointed Gaetano Morazzoni as new president, but kept the majority of the stakes in the club. For the first time in their history, the club played in the Serie B tournament. Several players were signed, such as Avellino goalkeeper Ottorino Piotti, defender Mauro Tassotti from Lazio and midfielder Stefano Cuoghi from Modena. Other additions to the squad were Sergio Battistini, Alberico Evani and Andrea Icardi from the youth team. Meanwhile, midfielder Alberto Bigon and forward Stefano Chiodi were transferred out to S.S. Lazio, midfielder Fabio Capello retired after injuries and goalkeeper Enrico Albertosi was banned two years after Totonero.

In Coppa Italia, the team was eliminated in the first round finishing fourth in a group including Avellino, Catania, Palermo and Inter.

In 1980-81 Serie B the squad reached the promotion to Serie A, finishing the competition in first place with 50 points, two more than Genoa and Cesena, both also promoted to Serie A. In the league, Milan collected 18 wins, 14 draws, 6 defeats, with 49 goals scored and 29 goals conceded. Right after the achievement of the promotion in the home game against Monza, head coach Massimo Giacomini left the squad, and Italo Galbiati was appointed as caretaker for the last match against Pescara. Roberto Antonelli was the top goalscorer of the Serie B season, with 15 goals.

== Squad ==
Note: Flags indicate national team as defined under FIFA eligibility rules; some limited exceptions apply. Players may hold more than one non-FIFA nationality.

Pos.	Nation	Player
GK	ITA	Roberto Incontri
GK	ITA	Ottorino Piotti
GK	ITA	Antonio Vettore
DF	ITA	Franco Baresi
DF	ITA	Aldo Bet
DF	ITA	Fulvio Collovati
DF	ITA	Andrea Icardi
MF	ITA	Aldo Maldera
DF	ITA	Alberto Minoia
DF	ITA	Mauro Tassotti
MF	ITA	Sergio Battistini
MF	ITA	Marco Bolis

Pos.	Nation	Player
MF	ITA	Ruben Buriani
MF	ITA	Gabriello Carotti
MF	ITA	Stefano Cuoghi
MF	ITA	Walter De Vecchi
MF	ITA	Alberigo Evani
MF	ITA	Cesare Maestroni
MF	ITA	Emilio Monzani
MF	ITA	Walter Novellino
MF	ITA	Francesco Romano
FW	ITA	Roberto Antonelli
FW	ITA	Giuseppe Galluzzo
FW	ITA	Francesco Vincenzi

=== Transfers ===
In
Pos.	Name	from	Type
DF	Mauro Tassotti	Lazio	
GK	Ottorino Piotti	Avellino	
MF	Stefano Cuoghi	Modena	
FW	Francesco Vincenzi	Monza	
GK	Roberto Incontri	Livorno	loan ended
GK	Antonio Vettore	Forlì	
MF	Cesare Maestroni	Modena	

Out
Pos.	Name	To	Type
MF	Alberto Bigon	Lazio	
FW	Stefano Chiodi	Lazio	
MF	Fabio Capello	–	retired
MF	Giorgio Morini	Pro Patria	
GK	Francesco Navazzotti	Reggina	
GK	Antonio Rigamonti	Varese	
FW	Roberto Mandressi	Como Calcio	loan

== Competitions ==
=== Serie B ===
==== League table ====
Pos	Team	Pld	W	D	L	GF	GA	GD	Pts	Promotion or relegation
1	Milan (C, P)	38	18	14	6	49	29	+20	50	Promotion to Serie A
2	Genoa (P)	38	17	14	7	47	29	+18	48	Promotion to Serie A
3	Cesena (P)	38	16	16	6	44	26	+18	48	Promotion to Serie A
4	Lazio	38	13	20	5	50	32	+18	46	
5	Sampdoria	38	11	21	6	39	33	+6	43	

Source: Panini
(C) Champions; (P) Promoted

==== Results by round ====
Round	1	2	3	4	5	6	7	8	9	10	11	12	13	14	15	16	17	18	19	20	21	22	23	24	25	26	27	28	29	30	31	32	33	34	35	36	37	38
Ground	H	A	H	A	H	H	A	H	A	H	H	A	A	H	A	A	H	A	H	A	H	A	H	A	A	H	A	H	A	A	H	H	A	H	H	A	H	A
Result	W	D	W	D	W	W	D	D	W	W	D	D	L	D	W	W	W	W	D	D	W	D	W	D	W	L	L	W	W	L	W	W	D	L	D	D	W	L
Position	1	2	1	1	1	1	1	2	1	1	1	1	2	2	2	1	1	1	1	1	1	1	1	1	1	1	1	1	1	1	1	1	1	1	1	1	1	1

Source: Competitive matches
A = Away; H = Home; W = Win; D = Draw; L = Loss; = Leader, Promoted to 1981–82 Serie A; = Promoted to 1981–82 Serie A; = Relegated to 1981–82 Serie C1

==== Matches ====
14 September 1980 1	Milan	1–0	A.S. Bari	Milan
	De Vecchi 66'	Report		Stadium: San Siro; Attendance: 33,763; Referee: Paolo Milan

21 September 1980 2	Varese	0–0	Milan	Varese
		Report		Stadium: Stadio Franco Ossola; Attendance: 18,000; Referee: Pierluigi Magni

28 September 1980 3	Milan	2–0	Genoa C.F.C.	Milan
	Vincenzi 5'; Antonelli 46'	Report		Stadium: San Siro; Attendance: 46,653; Referee: Alberto Michelotti

5 October 1980 4	Catania	2–2	Milan	Catania
	Baresi 37' (o.g.); Bonesso 86'	Report	68' Antonelli; 88' (o.g.) Ciampoli	Stadium: Cibali; Attendance: 20,000; Referee: Gianfranco Menegali

12 October 1980 5	Milan	2–1	Hellas Verona	Milan
	Vincenzi 20', 72'	Report	22' (pen.) Guidolin	Stadium: San Siro; Attendance: 32,689; Referee: Pierluigi Pairetto

19 October 1980 6	Milan	2–0	Lecce	Milan
	Antonelli 48'; De Vecchi 75'	Report		Stadium: San Siro; Attendance: 23,712; Referee: Roberto Bianciardi

26 October 1980 7	Sampdoria	0–0	Milan	Genova
		Report		Stadium: Luigi Ferraris; Attendance: 42,921; Referee: Pietro D'Elia

2 November 1980 8	Milan	0–0	Palermo F.C.	Milan
		Report		Stadium: San Siro; Attendance: 30,052; Referee: Mattei

9 November 1980 9	Atalanta B.C.	1–3	Milan	Bergamo
	Messina 72'	Report	30' Cuoghi; 56' (pen.) Buriani; 75' Vincenzi	Stadium: Comunale; Attendance: 27,160; Referee: Ballerini

16 November 1980 10	Milan	2–1	SPAL	Milan
	Novellino 33'; Carotti 86'	Report	20' Grop	Stadium: San Siro; Attendance: 39,763; Referee: Barbaresco

23 November 1980 11	Milan	1–1	Foggia	Milan
	Buriani 12' (pen.)	Report	40' Tivelli	Stadium: San Siro; Attendance: 28,521; Referee: Terpin

30 November 1980 12	Lanerossi Vicenza	1–1	Milan	Vicenza
	Zanini 4'	Report	45' (pen.) Antonelli	Stadium: Stadio Romeo Menti; Attendance: 26,174; Referee: Patrussi

7 December 1980 13	Taranto	3–0	Milan	Taranto
	Mutti 44', 85'; Cassano 81'	Report		Stadium: Erasmo Iacovone; Attendance: 23,637; Referee: Prati

14 December 1980 14	Milan	1–1	Cesena	Milan
	Antonelli 9'	Report	80' Garlini	Stadium: San Siro; Attendance: 21,380; Referee: Angelelli

21 December 1980 15	Pisa	0–1	Milan	Pisa
		Report	37' Antonelli	Stadium: Arena Garibaldi; Attendance: 26,892; Referee: Pieri

4 January 1981 16	S.S. Lazio	0–2	Milan	Roma
		Report	51', 56' Antonelli	Stadium: Olimpico; Attendance: 45,894; Referee: D'Elia

11 January 1981 17	Milan	3–1	Rimini	Milan
	Buriani 16' (pen.); Cuoghi 75'; Vincenzi 80'	Report	63' Traini	Stadium: San Siro; Attendance: 26,689; Referee: Lo Bello

18 January 1981 18	Monza	1–2	Milan	Monza
	Monelli 50'	Report	25' Antonelli; 30' Battistini	Stadium: Gino Alfonso Sada; Attendance: 9,618; Referee: Altobelli

25 January 1981 19	Milan	0–0	Pescara	Milan
		Report		Stadium: San Siro attendance = 29,340; Referee: Pirandola

8 February 1981 20	A.S. Bari	1–1	Milan	Bari
	Canestrari 55'	Report	36' Maldera	Stadium: della Vittoria; Attendance: 38,515; Referee: Renzo Vitali

15 February 1981 21	Milan	1–0	Varese	Milan
	Cerantola 74' (o.g.)	Report		Stadium: San Siro; Attendance: 25,491; Referee: Magni

22 February 1981 22	Genoa C.F.C	0–0	Milan	Genova
		Report		Stadium: Stadio Luigi Ferraris; Attendance: 31,891; Referee: Mario Facchin

1 March 1981 23	Milan	4–1	Catania	Milan
	Buriani 8' (pen.), 26'; Maldera 42'; Battistini 87'	Report	65' Piga	Stadium: San Siro; Attendance: 23,981; Referee: Paolo Milan

8 March 1981 24	Hellas Verona	1–1	Milan	Verona
	Tricella 11'	Report	88' Battistini	Stadium: Marcantonio Bentegodi; Attendance: 34,055; Referee: Pierluigi Pairetto

15 March 1981 25	Lecce	2–3	Milan	Lecce
	Re 6'; Improta 30' (pen.)	Report	4', 75' Vincenzi; 89' Antonelli	Stadium: Comunale; Attendance: 25,332; Referee: Ciulli

22 March 1981 26	Milan	0–1	Sampdoria	Milan
		Report	62' Chiorri	Stadium: San Siro; Attendance: 46,715; Referee: Barbaresco

29 March 1981 27	Palermo F.C.	3–1	Milan	Palermo
	Calloni 5', 22' (pen.), 38'	Report	33' (pen.) Buriani	Stadium: La Favorita; Attendance: 28,098; Referee: Angelelli

5 April 1981 28	Milan	1–0	Atalanta B.C.	Milan
	Maldera 77'	Report		Stadium: San Siro; Attendance: 37,828; Referee: Luigi Altobelli

12 April 1981 29	S.P.A.L.	1–2	Milan	Ferrara
	Tagliaferri 20'	Report	17', 69' Antonelli	Stadium: Comunale; Attendance: 22,000; Referee: Domenico Lops

18 April 1981 30	Foggia	1–0	Milan	Foggia
	Tivelli 53' (pen.)	Report		Stadium: Pino Zaccheria; Attendance: 18,838; Referee: Domenico Falzier

26 April 1981 31	Milan	2–0	Lanerossi Vicenza	Milan
	Collovati 31'; Battistini 70'	Report		Stadium: San Siro; Attendance: 17,868; Referee: Tullio Lanese

10 May 1981 32	Milan	4–0	Taranto	Milan
	Antonelli 22', 52' (pen.); Cuoghi 49'; Battistini 61'	Report		Stadium: San Siro; Attendance: 23,173; Referee: Renzo Vitali

17 May 1981 33	Cesena	0–0	Milan	Cesena
		Report		Stadium: La Fiorita; Attendance: 28,602; Referee: Gino Menicucci

24 May 1981 34	Milan	0–1	Pisa	Milan
		Report	22' Chierico	Stadium: San Siro; Attendance: 29,963; Referee: Lanese

31 May 1981 35	Milan	1–1	S.S. Lazio	Milan
	Novellino 16'	Report	68' Bigon	Stadium: San Siro; Attendance: 49,257; Referee: Agnolin

7 June 1981 36	Rimini	2–2	Milan	Rimini
	Saltutti 18'; Baldoni 59'	Report	20' Antonelli; 73' Collovati	Stadium: Romeo Neri; Attendance: 11,931; Referee: Pieri

14 June 1981 37	Milan	1–0	Monza	Milan
	Novellino 25'	Report		Stadium: San Siro; Attendance: 26,760; Referee: Walter Parussini

21 June 1981 38	Pescara	1–0	Milan	Pescara
	Silva 12'	Report		Stadium: Adriatico; Attendance: 10,167; Referee: Bruno Tuveri

=== Coppa Italia ===
==== First round ====
Group 2
Pos	Team	Pld	W	D	L	GF	GA	GD	Pts
1	Avellino	4	2	2	0	7	3	+4	6
2	Palermo	4	3	0	1	6	4	+2	6
3	Internazionale	4	1	2	1	3	3	0	4
4	Milan	4	1	1	2	2	3	−1	3
5	Catania	4	0	1	3	3	8	−5	1

===== Matches =====
20 August 1980 1	Avellino	1–1	Milan	Avellino
	Criscimanni 11'		48' Baresi	Stadium: Stadio Partenio; Attendance: 21,063; Referee: Gianfranco Menegali

24 August 1980 2	Milan	1–0	Catania	Milan
	Chiavaro 25' (o.g.)			Stadium: San Siro; Attendance: 20,003; Referee: Tani

3 September 1980 3	Palermo F.C.	1–0	Milan	Palermo
	Calloni 65'			Stadium: La Favorita; Attendance: 35,791; Referee: Vittorio Benedetti

7 September 1980 4	Milan	0–1	Inter	Milan
			66' Altobelli	Stadium: San Siro; Attendance: 51,431; Referee: Riccardo Lattanzi

== Statistics ==
=== Squad statistics ===
Competition	Points	Home						Away						Total						GD
Competition	Points	G	W	D	L	Gs	Ga	G	W	D	L	Gs	Ga	G	W	D	L	Gs	Ga	GD
1980-81 Serie B	50	19	12	5	2	28	9	19	6	9	4	21	20	38	18	14	6	49	29	+20
1980-81 Coppa Italia	–	2	1	0	1	1	1	2	0	1	1	1	2	4	1	1	2	2	3	−1
Total	–	21	13	5	3	29	10	21	6	10	5	22	22	42	19	15	8	51	32	+19

=== Players statistics ===
No.	Pos	Nat	Player	Total		1980-81 Serie B		1980-81 Coppa Italia	
No.	Pos	Nat	Player	Apps	Goals	Apps	Goals	Apps	Goals
	GK	(Italy) ITA	Piotti	40	-28	37	-26	3	-2
	DF	(Italy) ITA	Tassotti	36	0	33	0	3	0
	DF	(Italy) ITA	Baresi	35	1	31	0	4	1
	DF	(Italy) ITA	Collovati	39	2	36	2	3	0
	DF	(Italy) ITA	Maldera	31	3	27	3	4	0
	MF	(Italy) ITA	Novellino	40	3	36	3	4	0
	MF	(Italy) ITA	De Vecchi	39	2	35+1	2	3	0
	MF	(Italy) ITA	Battistini	40	5	34+3	5	3	0
	FW	(Italy) ITA	Buriani	42	6	38	6	4	0
	FW	(Italy) ITA	Antonelli	35	15	32	15	3	0
	FW	(Italy) ITA	Cuoghi	27	3	22+5	3	0	0
	GK	(Italy) ITA	Vettore	2	-3	1+1	-3	0	-0
	FW	(Italy) ITA	Vincenzi	28	7	17+8	7	3	0
	MF	(Italy) ITA	Romano	23	0	14+5	0	4	0
	DF	(Italy) ITA	Minoia	24	0	11+11	0	2	0
	MF	(Italy) ITA	Carotti	21	1	4+13	1	4	0
	FW	(Italy) ITA	Galluzzo	11	0	4+5	0	2	0
	MF	(Italy) ITA	Icardi	5	0	4+1	0	0	0
	DF	(Italy) ITA	Bet	5	0	1+4	0	0	0
	MF	(Italy) ITA	Bolis	2	0	0+2	0	0	0
	MF	(Italy) ITA	Evani	1	0	1	0	0	0
	GK	(Italy) ITA	Incontri	1	-1	0	0	1	-1
	MF	(Italy) ITA	Monzani	4	0	0+3	0	1	0
	MF	(Italy) ITA	Cambiaghi	0	0	0	0		
	MF	(Italy) ITA	Maestroni	0	0	0	0	0	0

== See also ==
- "Almanacco illustrato del Milan" (2 ed.). Panini. Panini. 2005.
