= List of AC Milan managers =

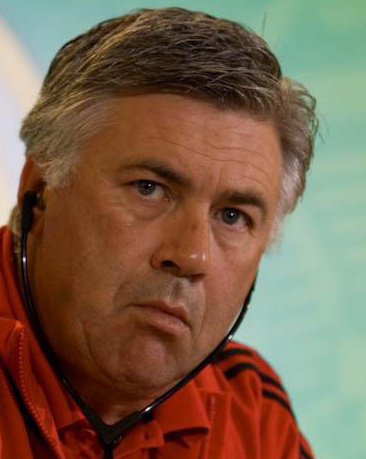
Carlo Ancelotti managed Milan for eight straight seasons from 2001 to 2009.

Associazione Calcio Milan are an Italian professional football club based in Milan, Lombardy, who currently play in Serie A. This chronological list comprises all those who have held the position of manager or technical director (i.e. a manager who has exceeded the age limit, currently set at 65, and is only allowed to manage a professional club if joined by a qualified manager) of the first team of Milan since their foundation in 1899. Each manager's entry includes the seasons he spent at the club, the team's overall competitive record (in terms of matches won, drawn and lost) and honours won during his tenure. Caretaker managers are included, as well as those who have been in permanent charge.

The most successful person to manage Milan is Nereo Rocco, who won two Serie A titles, three Coppa Italia, two European Cups, two Cup Winners' Cups and one Intercontinental Cup during his tenures as head coach and technical director. Rocco has also been Milan's longest-serving manager, managing the club for 459 matches (323 as head coach and 136 as technical director) in five different spells between 1961 and 1977. Milan's longest-serving manager over a single time-span is, instead, Carlo Ancelotti, whose tenure lasted seven years and 236 days, from 6 November 2001 to 30 June 2009.

== List of managers ==
Statistics correct as of match played 22 November 2026. Only competitive matches are counted.

Manager	Season	M	W	D	L	GF	GA	Win% (Note: Win% is rounded to two decimal places.)	Honours	Notes
(England) Herbert Kilpin (Note: Serving as player-manager.)	1899–1900	1	0	0	1	0	3	0.00		
(England) Herbert Kilpin	1900–01	3	3	0	0	8	2	100.00	League title	
(England) Herbert Kilpin	1901–02	1	0	0	1	0	2	0.00		
(England) Herbert Kilpin	1902–03	1	0	0	1	0	2	0.00		
(England) Herbert Kilpin	1903–04	3	1	1	1	2	4	33.33		
(England) Herbert Kilpin	1904–05	2	0	1	1	9	10	0.00		
(England) Herbert Kilpin	1905–06	8	5	2	1	14	8	62.50	League title	
(England) Herbert Kilpin	Total	19	9	4	6	33	31	47.37		
(Italy) Daniele Angeloni	1906–07	6	4	2	0	17	3	66.67	League title	
(Italy) Giannino Camperio	1907–08 (Note: In the 1907–08 season, Milan and other major clubs did not enter the league due to a dispute with the Italian Football Federation over the use of foreign players.)	0	0	0	0	0	0	—		
(Italy) Giannino Camperio	1908–09	2	1	0	1	4	5	50.00		
(Italy) Giannino Camperio	1909–10	16	6	1	9	23	36	37.50		
(Italy) Giannino Camperio	1910–11	16	10	2	4	44	19	62.50		
(Italy) Giannino Camperio	Total	34	17	3	14	71	60	50.00		
Technical committee	1911–12	18	14	3	1	60	10	77.78		
Technical committee	1912–13	18	13	2	3	46	14	72.22		
Technical committee	1913–14	18	11	4	3	58	19	61.11		
Technical committee	1914–15	21	13	5	3	65	18	61.90		
Technical committee	Total	75	51	14	10	229	61	68.00		
(Italy) Guido Moda (Note: Serving as caretaker manager.)	1915–16	12	9	1	2	22	9	75.00		All wartime games
(Italy) Aldo Cevenini	1916–17	12	10	1	1	45	12	83.33		All wartime games
(Italy) Aldo Cevenini	1917–18	13	11	0	2	35	11	84.62		All wartime games
(Italy) Aldo Cevenini	Total	25	21	1	3	80	23	84.00		
Technical committee	1918–19	10	6	2	2	28	17	60.00		All wartime games
(Italy) Guido Moda	1919–20	20	14	1	5	56	24	70.00		
(Italy) Guido Moda	1920–21	22	8	4	10	43	34	36.36		
(Italy) Guido Moda	Total	42	22	5	15	99	58	52.38		
(Italy) Cesare Lovati	1921–22	22	7	4	11	29	36	31.82		
(Italy) Francesco Soldera	1922	5	1	2	2	5	14	20.00		Until November 1922
(Austria) Ferdi Oppenheim	1922–23	17	7	8	2	27	14	41.18		Appointed in November 1922
(Austria) Ferdi Oppenheim	1923–24	22	7	5	10	38	44	31.82		
(Austria) Ferdi Oppenheim	Total	39	14	13	12	65	58	35.90		
(Italy) Vittorio Pozzo	1924–25	24	10	1	13	45	51	41.67		
(Italy) Vittorio Pozzo	1925–26	9	3	0	6	15	24	33.33		Sacked on 29 January 1926
(Italy) Vittorio Pozzo	Total	33	13	1	19	60	75	39.39		
(Italy) Guido Moda	1926	13	7	2	4	28	15	53.85		Appointed on 30 January 1926
(England) Herbert Burgess	1926–27	30	15	4	11	63	53	50.00		
(England) Herbert Burgess	1927–28	34	15	10	9	56	47	44.12		
(England) Herbert Burgess	Total	64	30	14	20	119	100	46.88		
(Austria) Engelbert König	1928–29	32	18	8	6	80	37	56.25		
(Austria) Engelbert König	1929–30	34	11	10	13	52	48	32.35		
(Austria) Engelbert König	1930–31	34	12	7	15	48	53	35.29		
(Austria) Engelbert König	Total	100	41	25	34	180	138	41.00		
(Hungary) József Bánás	1931–32	34	15	9	10	57	40	44.12		
(Hungary) József Bánás	1932–33	34	11	10	13	57	62	32.35		
(Hungary) József Bánás	Total	68	26	19	23	114	102	38.24		
(Hungary) József Violak	1933–34	34	12	9	13	50	49	35.29		
(Italy) Adolfo Baloncieri	1934–35	30	8	11	11	36	38	26.67		
(Italy) Adolfo Baloncieri	1935–36	34	13	8	13	49	45	38.24		
(Italy) Adolfo Baloncieri	1936	10	3	4	3	9	9	30.00		Sacked on 5 December 1936
(Italy) Adolfo Baloncieri	Total	74	24	23	27	94	92	32.43		
(England) William Garbutt	1936–37	26	13	8	5	43	26	50.00		Appointed on 6 December 1936
(Germany) Hermann Felsner (Note: Serving as technical director.) (Hungary) József Bánás	1937–38	38	17	14	7	57	36	44.74		
(Germany) Hermann Felsner (Hungary) József Bánás	1938	4	0	1	3	1	4	0.00		Felsner sacked in October 1938
(Germany) Hermann Felsner (Hungary) József Bánás	Total	42	17	15	10	58	40	40.48		
(Hungary) József Bánás	1938–39	17	6	4	7	26	21	35.29		
(Hungary) József Violak (Hungary) József Bánás	1939	13	7	3	3	19	14	53.85		Violak appointed in March 1939
(Hungary) József Violak (Hungary) József Bánás	1939–40	24	8	6	10	37	31	33.33		Violak sacked on 18 March 1940
(Hungary) József Violak (Hungary) József Bánás	Total	37	15	9	13	56	45	40.54		
(Hungary) József Bánás	1939–40	9	3	3	3	12	13	33.33		
(Italy) Antonio Busini (Italy) Guido Ara	1940–41	32	13	10	9	60	37	40.63		
(Italy) Mario Magnozzi	1941–42	36	14	8	14	71	62	38.89		
(Italy) Mario Magnozzi	1942–43	33	12	9	12	47	54	36.36		
(Italy) Mario Magnozzi	Total	69	26	17	26	118	116	37.68		
(Italy) Giuseppe Santagostino	1943–44	14	5	3	6	18	16	35.71		All wartime games
(Italy) Giuseppe Santagostino	1944–45	20	6	6	8	29	36	30.00		All wartime games
(Italy) Giuseppe Santagostino	Total	34	11	9	14	47	52	32.35		
(Italy) Antonio Busini (Italy) Adolfo Baloncieri	1945–46	42	20	9	13	66	54	47.62		
(Italy) Antonio Busini (Italy) Giuseppe Bigogno	1946–47	38	19	12	7	75	52	50.00		
(Italy) Giuseppe Bigogno	1947–48	40	21	7	12	76	48	52.50		
(Italy) Antonio Busini (Italy) Giuseppe Bigogno	1948–49	38	21	8	9	83	52	55.26		
(Italy) Antonio Busini (Hungary) Lajos Czeizler	1949–50	38	27	3	8	118	45	71.05		
(Italy) Antonio Busini (Hungary) Lajos Czeizler	1950–51	40	28	8	4	116	40	70.00	Serie A title Latin Cup	
(Italy) Antonio Busini (Hungary) Lajos Czeizler	1951–52	38	20	13	5	87	41	52.63		
(Italy) Antonio Busini (Hungary) Lajos Czeizler	Total	116	75	24	17	321	126	64.66		
(Italy) Antonio Busini (Italy) Mario Sperone	1952–53	34	17	9	8	64	34	50.00		Until May 1953
(Italy) Antonio Busini (Sweden) Gunnar Gren	1953	2	1	0	1	4	6	50.00		Gren appointed in June 1953
(Italy) Antonio Busini (Italy) Arrigo Morselli	1953	9	4	3	2	18	11	44.44		Sacked on 10 November 1953
(Hungary) Béla Guttmann	1953–54	25	13	7	5	48	28	52.00		Appointed on 11 November 1953
(Hungary) Béla Guttmann	1954–55	19	12	4	3	45	21	63.16		Sacked on 14 February 1955
(Hungary) Béla Guttmann	Total	44	25	11	8	93	49	56.82		
(Italy) Ettore Puricelli	1955	17	8	6	3	41	18	47.06	Serie A title	Appointed on 15 February 1955
(Italy) Ettore Puricelli	1955–56	42	21	10	11	96	64	50.00	Latin Cup	
(Italy) Ettore Puricelli	Total	59	29	16	14	137	82	49.15		
(Italy) Giuseppe Viani	1956–57	36	22	6	8	70	48	61.11	Serie A title	
(Italy) Giuseppe Viani	1957–58	44	15	15	14	89	63	34.09		
(Italy) Giuseppe Viani	Total	80	37	21	22	159	111	46.25		
(Italy) Giuseppe Viani (Italy) Luigi Bonizzoni	1958	6	5	1	0	18	5	83.33		Bonizzoni appointed in June 1958
(Italy) Giuseppe Viani (Italy) Luigi Bonizzoni	1958–59	39	21	13	5	99	44	53.85	Serie A title	
(Italy) Giuseppe Viani (Italy) Luigi Bonizzoni	1959–60	42	21	11	10	74	51	50.00		
(Italy) Giuseppe Viani (Italy) Luigi Bonizzoni	Total	87	47	25	15	191	100	54.02		
(Italy) Giuseppe Viani (Italy) Paolo Todeschini	1960–61	36	19	9	8	71	44	52.78		Until June 1961
(Italy) Giuseppe Viani (Italy) Nereo Rocco	1961	2	0	1	1	0	2	0.00		Rocco appointed in June 1961
(Italy) Giuseppe Viani (Italy) Nereo Rocco	1961–62	43	28	7	8	103	49	65.12	Serie A title	
(Italy) Giuseppe Viani (Italy) Nereo Rocco	1962–63	49	26	13	10	97	39	53.06	European Cup	
(Italy) Giuseppe Viani (Italy) Nereo Rocco	Total	94	54	21	19	200	90	57.45		
(Italy) Giuseppe Viani (Argentina) Luis Carniglia	1963–64	30	16	8	6	55	33	53.33		Carniglia sacked on 2 March 1964
(Italy) Giuseppe Viani (Sweden) Nils Liedholm	1964	12	8	2	2	18	10	66.67		Liedholm appointed on 3 March 1964
(Italy) Giuseppe Viani (Sweden) Nils Liedholm	1964–65	37	22	9	6	54	27	59.46		
(Italy) Giuseppe Viani (Sweden) Nils Liedholm	Total	49	30	11	8	72	37	61.22		
(Sweden) Nils Liedholm	1965–66	33	15	10	8	44	33	45.45		Resigned in March 1966 due to illness
(Italy) Giovanni Cattozzo	1966	11	2	4	5	10	12	18.18		Appointed in March 1966
(Italy) Arturo Silvestri	1966–67	42	17	16	9	53	39	40.48	Coppa Italia	Until June 1967
(Italy) Nereo Rocco	1967	5	1	2	2	3	3	20.00		Appointed in June 1967
(Italy) Nereo Rocco	1967–68	50	26	21	3	86	40	52.00	Serie A title Cup Winners' Cup	
(Italy) Nereo Rocco	1968–69	42	20	15	7	49	19	47.62	European Cup	
(Italy) Nereo Rocco	1969–70	39	18	12	9	57	31	46.15	Intercontinental Cup	
(Italy) Nereo Rocco	1970–71	42	23	14	5	77	36	54.76		
(Italy) Nereo Rocco	1971–72	51	29	15	7	71	31	56.86	Coppa Italia	
(Italy) Nereo Rocco	Total	229	117	79	33	343	160	51.09		
(Italy) Nereo Rocco (Italy) Cesare Maldini	1972–73	46	30	11	5	89	39	65.22	Coppa Italia; Cup Winners' Cup	
(Italy) Nereo Rocco	1973–74	12	5	5	2	18	13	41.67		
(Italy) Nereo Rocco (Italy) Cesare Maldini	1973–74	14	8	0	6	15	17	57.14		Maldini appointed in December 1973; Rocco resigned in February 1974
(Italy) Cesare Maldini	1974	11	4	2	5	18	20	36.36		Sacked in April 1974
(Italy) Giovanni Trapattoni	1974	10	2	4	4	5	7	20.00		Appointed in April 1974
(Italy) Gustavo Giagnoni	1974–75	41	18	15	8	54	30	43.90		
(Italy) Gustavo Giagnoni	1975	6	4	2	0	8	2	66.67		Sacked in October 1975
(Italy) Gustavo Giagnoni	Total	47	22	17	8	62	32	46.81		
(Italy) Nereo Rocco (Italy) Giovanni Trapattoni	1975–76	37	19	9	9	53	33	51.35		Appointed in October 1975; Trapattoni resigned in May 1976
(Italy) Nereo Rocco (Italy) Paolo Barison	1976	5	1	2	2	7	8	20.00		Barison appointed in June 1976
(Italy) Giuseppe Marchioro	1976–77	25	7	12	6	30	29	28.00		Sacked in February 1977
(Italy) Nereo Rocco	1977	22	10	8	4	36	19	45.45	Coppa Italia	Appointed in February 1977
(Sweden) Nils Liedholm	1977–78	38	16	15	7	51	33	42.11		
(Sweden) Nils Liedholm	1978–79	40	21	13	6	62	33	52.50	Serie A title	
(Sweden) Nils Liedholm	Total	78	37	28	13	113	66	47.44		
(Italy) Massimo Giacomini	1979–80	38	17	11	10	43	29	44.74		
(Italy) Massimo Giacomini	1980–81	41	19	15	7	51	31	46.34		Resigned in June 1981
(Italy) Massimo Giacomini	Total	79	36	26	17	94	60	45.57		
(Italy) Italo Galbiati	1981	1	0	0	1	0	1	0.00	Serie B title (Note: The title had already been secured under previous manager Massimo Giacomini.)	Appointed in June 1981
(Italy) Luigi Radice	1981–82	23	6	8	9	18	20	26.09		Sacked in January 1982
(Italy) Italo Galbiati (Note: Galbiati shared the position with Francesco Zagatti for two games in March.)	1982	17	7	4	6	21	19	41.18	Mitropa Cup	Appointed in January 1982
(Italy) Ilario Castagner	1982–83	47	24	19	4	96	50	51.06	Serie B title	
(Italy) Ilario Castagner	1983–84	31	12	13	6	42	36	38.71		Sacked in March 1984
(Italy) Ilario Castagner	Total	78	36	32	10	138	86	46.15		
(Italy) Italo Galbiati	1984	8	3	2	3	8	10	37.50		Appointed in March 1984
(Sweden) Nils Liedholm	1984–85	43	17	18	8	45	35	39.53		
(Sweden) Nils Liedholm	1985–86	46	15	15	16	45	44	32.61		
(Sweden) Nils Liedholm	1986–87	31	14	8	9	31	21	45.16		Sacked on 5 April 1987
(Sweden) Nils Liedholm	Total	120	46	41	33	121	100	38.33		
(Italy) Fabio Capello	1987	7	3	3	1	7	3	42.86		Appointed on 6 April 1987
(Italy) Arrigo Sacchi	1987–88	41	22	14	5	59	22	53.66	Serie A title	
(Italy) Arrigo Sacchi	1988–89	52	27	20	5	98	37	51.92	European Cup; Supercoppa Italiana	
(Italy) Arrigo Sacchi	1989–90	54	33	11	10	82	34	61.11	European Cup; European Super Cup; Intercontinental Cup	
(Italy) Arrigo Sacchi	1990–91	49	24	17	8	62	28	48.98	European Super Cup; Intercontinental Cup	
(Italy) Arrigo Sacchi	Total	196	106	62	28	301	121	54.08		
(Italy) Fabio Capello	1991–92	42	25	16	1	84	27	59.52	Serie A title	
(Italy) Fabio Capello	1992–93	54	34	16	4	107	39	62.96	Serie A title Supercoppa Italiana	
(Italy) Fabio Capello	1993–94	54	29	19	6	66	25	53.70	Serie A title Champions League; Supercoppa Italiana	
(Italy) Fabio Capello	1994–95	53	25	13	15	70	46	47.17	European Super Cup; Supercoppa Italiana	
(Italy) Fabio Capello	1995–96	46	29	13	4	83	32	63.04	Serie A title	
(Italy) Fabio Capello	Total	249	142	77	30	410	169	57.03		
(Uruguay) Óscar Tabárez (Italy) Giorgio Morini	1996–97	22	8	7	7	36	27	36.36		Sacked on 2 December 1996
(Italy) Arrigo Sacchi	1996–97	24	7	7	10	27	33	29.17		Appointed on 3 December 1996
(Italy) Fabio Capello	1997–98	44	16	14	14	53	52	36.36		
(Italy) Alberto Zaccheroni	1998–99	38	21	11	6	64	40	55.26	Serie A title	
(Italy) Alberto Zaccheroni	1999–2000	45	18	17	10	80	56	40.00		
(Italy) Alberto Zaccheroni	2000–01	42	15	16	11	68	59	35.71		Sacked on 14 March 2001
(Italy) Alberto Zaccheroni	Total	125	54	44	27	212	155	43.20		
(Italy) Cesare Maldini (Italy) Mauro Tassotti	2001	12	5	4	3	22	11	41.67		Appointed on 15 March 2001
(Turkey) Fatih Terim (Italy) Antonio Di Gennaro	2001	13	8	3	2	27	12	61.54		Sacked on 5 November 2001
(Italy) Carlo Ancelotti	2001–02	39	17	13	9	49	35	43.59		Appointed on 6 November 2001
(Italy) Carlo Ancelotti	2002–03	61	32	15	14	97	54	52.46	Coppa Italia; Champions League	
(Italy) Carlo Ancelotti	2003–04	53	35	11	7	87	43	66.04	Serie A title UEFA Super Cup	
(Italy) Carlo Ancelotti	2004–05	56	36	12	8	97	44	64.29	Supercoppa Italiana	
(Italy) Carlo Ancelotti	2005–06	54	36	9	9	113	48	66.67		
(Italy) Carlo Ancelotti	2006–07	59	31	16	12	91	56	52.54	Champions League	
(Italy) Carlo Ancelotti	2007–08	51	25	13	13	88	51	49.02	UEFA Super Cup; Club World Cup	
(Italy) Carlo Ancelotti	2008–09	47	26	12	9	86	46	55.32		
(Italy) Carlo Ancelotti	Total	420	238	101	81	708	377	56.67		
(Brazil) Leonardo	2009–10	48	23	13	12	72	55	47.92		
(Italy) Massimiliano Allegri	2010–11	50	28	14	8	80	37	56.00	Serie A title	
(Italy) Massimiliano Allegri	2011–12	53	30	13	10	100	53	56.60	Supercoppa Italiana	
(Italy) Massimiliano Allegri	2012–13	48	25	11	12	80	51	52.08		
(Italy) Massimiliano Allegri	2013–14	27	8	11	8	43	36	29.63		Sacked on 13 January 2014
(Italy) Massimiliano Allegri	Total	178	91	49	38	303	177	51.12		
(Italy) Mauro Tassotti	2014	1	1	0	0	3	1	100.00		Appointed on 13 January 2014; Until 16 January 2014
(Netherlands) Clarence Seedorf	2014	22	11	2	9	28	26	50.00		Appointed on 16 January 2014
(Italy) Filippo Inzaghi	2014–15	40	14	13	13	58	52	35.00		
(Serbia) Siniša Mihajlović	2015–16	38	19	10	9	57	37	50.00		Sacked on 12 April 2016
(Italy) Cristian Brocchi	2016	7	2	2	3	7	9	28.57		Appointed on 12 April 2016
(Italy) Vincenzo Montella	2016–17	41	19	10	12	61	48	46.34	Supercoppa Italiana	
(Italy) Vincenzo Montella	2017	23	13	4	6	42	22	56.52		Sacked on 27 November 2017
(Italy) Vincenzo Montella	Total	64	32	14	18	103	70	50.00		
(Italy) Gennaro Gattuso	2017–18	34	16	10	8	46	35	47.06		Appointed on 27 November 2017
(Italy) Gennaro Gattuso	2018–19	49	24	13	12	71	47	48.98		
(Italy) Gennaro Gattuso	Total	83	40	23	20	117	82	48.19		
(Italy) Marco Giampaolo	2019	7	3	0	4	6	9	42.86		Sacked on 8 October 2019
(Italy) Stefano Pioli	2019–20	35	18	11	6	65	40	51.43		Appointed on 9 October 2019
(Italy) Stefano Pioli	2020–21	53	30	13	10	98	59	56.60		
(Italy) Stefano Pioli	2021–22	48	29	10	9	82	44	60.42	Serie A title	
(Italy) Stefano Pioli	2022–23	52	25	13	14	79	58	48.08		
(Italy) Stefano Pioli	2023–24	52	28	11	13	99	69	53.85		
(Italy) Stefano Pioli	Total	240	130	58	52	423	270	54.17		
(Portugal) Paulo Fonseca	2024	24	12	6	6	44	27	50.00		Sacked on 30 December 2024
(Portugal) Sérgio Conceição	2024–25	31	16	5	10	50	36	51.61	Supercoppa Italiana	Appointed on 30 December 2024
(Italy) Massimiliano Allegri	2025–26	42	22	10	10	58	38	52.38		
(Portugal) Ruben Amorim	2026–27	16	9	3	4	32	21	56.25		

=== Most games managed ===
Rank	Manager	Games
1	(Italy) Nereo Rocco	459
2	(Italy) Carlo Ancelotti	420
3	(Italy) Giuseppe Viani	376
4	(Italy) Fabio Capello	300
5	(Sweden) Nils Liedholm	280
6	(Italy) Stefano Pioli	240
7	(Italy) Massimiliano Allegri	220
7	(Italy) Arrigo Sacchi	220
9	(Italy) Antonio Busini	193
10	(Hungary) József Bánás	173

=== Most games won ===
Rank	Manager	Games won
1	(Italy) Nereo Rocco	243
2	(Italy) Carlo Ancelotti	238
3	(Italy) Giuseppe Viani	203
4	(Italy) Fabio Capello	161
5	(Italy) Stefano Pioli	130
6	(Sweden) Nils Liedholm	128
7	(Italy) Massimiliano Allegri	113
7	(Italy) Arrigo Sacchi	113
9	(Italy) Antonio Busini	110
10	(Hungary) Lajos Czeizler	75

=== Trophies ===
Rank	Manager	SA	CI	SCI	UCL	CWC	EL	USC	FCWC IC	Total
1	(Italy) Nereo Rocco	2	3	-	2	2	-	-	1	10
2	(Italy) Fabio Capello	4	-	3	1	-	-	1	-	9
3	(Italy) Arrigo Sacchi	1	-	1	2	-	-	2	2	8
3	(Italy) Carlo Ancelotti	1	1	1	2	-	-	2	1	8
5	(England) Herbert Kilpin	2	-	-	-	-	-	-	-	2
5	(Italy) Giuseppe Viani	2	-	-	-	-	-	-	-	2
5	(Italy) Massimiliano Allegri	1	-	1	-	-	-	-	-	2
9	(Italy) Stefano Pioli	1	-	-	-	-	-	-	-	1
9	(Italy) Alberto Zaccheroni	1	-	-	-	-	-	-	-	1
9	(Sweden) Nils Liedholm	1	-	-	-	-	-	-	-	1
9	(Italy) Ettore Puricelli	1	-	-	-	-	-	-	-	1
9	(Italy) Antonio Busini	1	-	-	-	-	-	-	-	1
9	(Italy) Daniele Angeloni	1	-	-	-	-	-	-	-	1
9	(Italy) Arturo Silvestri	-	1	-	-	-	-	-	-	1
9	(Italy) Vincenzo Montella	-	-	1	-	-	-	-	-	1
9	(Portugal) Sérgio Conceição	-	-	1	-	-	-	-	-	1
		19	5	8	7	2	-	5	4	50
