= Ruben Buriani =

Italian footballer

Personal information
- Date of birth: 16 March 1955 (age 71)
- Place of birth: Portomaggiore, Italy
- Height: 1.72 m (5 ft 8 in)
- Position: Midfielder

Youth career
- Portuense
- SPAL

Senior career*
Years	Team	Apps	(Gls)
1973–1974	SPAL	0	(0)
1974–1977	Monza	87	(7)
1977–1982	Milan	146	(13)
1982–1984	Cesena	66	(5)
1984–1985	Roma	24	(0)
1985–1986	Napoli	5	(0)
1986–1988	SPAL	24	(0)
Total		352	(25)

International career
1980	Italy	2	(0)
- * Club domestic league appearances and goals

Ruben Buriani (Italian pronunciation: [ˈruːbem buˈrjaːni]; born 16 March 1955) is an Italian former footballer who played as a midfielder. Following his retirement he worked as a sporting director for the Milan Youth sector.

== Club career ==
Buriani played 7 seasons (165 games, 10 goals in Serie A between 1977 and 1982) in the Serie A for A.C. Milan, A.C. Cesena, A.S. Roma and S.S.C. Napoli. A serious injury forced him to retire prematurely in 1985. He won the 1978–79 Serie A title with Milan. He made his debut with the club on the 11 September 1977, in a 1–1 away draw against Fiorentina in Serie A; he left the club following their second relegation to Serie B in 1982. In total he made 180 career appearances, scoring 14 goals, 13 of which came in Serie A, in 146 appearances.

== International career ==
For the Italy national football team, Buriani made two substitute appearances, which both came at the 1980 European Football Championship on home soil, in which Italy reached the semi-finals, eventually managing a fourth-place finish, under manager Enzo Bearzot.

=== International games ===
Game	Date	City	Opponent	Result	Competition
1.	16 February 1980	Naples	Romania	2 – 1	Friendly match
2.	19 April 1980	Turin	Poland	2 – 2	Friendly match

== Style of play ==
A hard-working team player, Buriani was known for his tireless stamina as a midfielder.

== Honours ==
=== Club ===
Milan

- Serie A: 1978–79.
- Serie B: 1980–81.
- Mitropa Cup: 1982.

Monza

- Coppa Italia Serie C: 1974–75.
- Serie C: 1975–76.

=== Individual ===
- A.C. Milan Hall of Fame
