= Stefano Ferrari =

Italian footballer

Personal information
- Date of birth: 1 January 1921
- Place of birth: Milan, Italy
- Position: Midfielder

Senior career*
Years	Team	Apps	(Gls)
1938–1941	Seregno		
1941–1942	Milano	0	(0)
1942–1943	Fiorentina	0	(0)
1943–1944	Brescia	3	(3)
1945–1946	Brescia	0	(0)
1946–1948	Roma	47	(13)
1948–1949	Seregno	35	(8)
1949–1952	Carbosarda		
- * Club domestic league appearances and goals

Stefano Ferrari (born 1 January 1921, date of death unknown) was an Italian professional football player. Born in Milan, he played for 2 seasons (47 games, 13 goals) in the Serie A for A.S. Roma. Ferrari is deceased.
