= Roberto Scarnecchia =

Italian footballer and manager

Personal information
- Date of birth: 20 June 1958 (age 68)
- Place of birth: Rome, Italy
- Height: 1.86 m (6 ft 1 in)
- Position: Midfielder

Senior career*
Years	Team	Apps	(Gls)
1976–1977	Almas Roma	34	(7)
1977–1982	Roma	71	(3)
1982–1983	Napoli	15	(0)
1983–1984	Pisa	13	(0)
1984–1985	Milan	11	(0)
1985–1986	Pisa	0	(0)
1986–1988	Barletta	57	(7)

Managerial career
- 2012–20??: Voghera
- * Club domestic league appearances and goals

Roberto Scarnecchia (born 20 June 1958) is an Italian association football manager and former player, who played as a midfielder.

== Playing career ==
Scarnecchia played eight seasons (110 games, six goals) in Serie A for Roma, Napoli, Pisa and A.C. Milan.

== Managerial career ==
In June 2012, Scarnecchia was appointed coach of Voghera in Serie D.

== After football ==
Following his retirement, Scarnecchia pursued culinary studies in order to become a professional chef, and later opened a restaurant in Genoa, called MarinaPlace, and one in Rome called Undici ("Eleven," in Italian, a reference to his shirt number as a player, and the number of players that a team fields on the football pitch); he also completed a degree in economics and politics and wrote a book, L’uovo di Colombo, which was released in 2007.
