= Roberto Mandressi =

Italian footballer

Personal information
- Date of birth: November 19, 1960 (age 65)
- Place of birth: Seregno, Italy
- Height: 1.76 m (5 ft 9 in)
- Position: Forward

Senior career*
Years	Team	Apps	(Gls)
1977–1978	Seregno	18	(4)
1978–1982	Milan	9	(0)
1980–1981	→ Como (loan)	12	(1)
1982	Pescara	6	(0)
1982–1983	Piacenza	24	(7)
1983–1984	Carrarese	20	(2)
1984–1985	Cavese	27	(12)
1985–1988	Catania	77	(7)
1988–1989	Campobasso	30	(4)
1989–1990	Monopoli	26	(4)
1990–1991	Carrarese	9	(0)
- * Club domestic league appearances and goals

Roberto Mandressi (born November 19, 1960) is an Italian former professional footballer who played as a forward. He made 258 appearances in the Italian professional leagues, and played for 3 seasons (21 games, 1 goal) in Serie A for AC Milan and Como.

== See also ==
- Football in Italy
- List of football clubs in Italy
