= Catello Cimmino =

Italian footballer (born 1965)

Personal information
- Date of birth: December 12, 1965 (age 60)
- Place of birth: Castellammare di Stabia, Italy
- Height: 1.84 m (6 ft 1/2 in)
- Position: Defender

Youth career
- Milan

Senior career*
Years	Team	Apps	(Gls)
1983–1985	Milan	3	(0)
1985–1986	Ascoli	36	(2)
1986	Milan	0	(0)
1986–1987	Ascoli	9	(0)
1987–1990	Como	34	(0)
1990–1991	Avellino	6	(0)
1992–1993	Ischia Isolaverde	31	(2)
- * Club domestic league appearances and goals

Catello Cimmino (born December 12, 1965) is a retired Italian professional football player.

He played for 4 seasons (26 games, no goals) in the Serie A for A.C. Milan, Ascoli Calcio 1898 and Calcio Como.

== Honours ==
- Coppa Italia Primavera winner: 1984/85.
- Mitropa Cup winner: 1986/87.
