= Daniele Tacconi =

Italian footballer (born 1960)

Personal information
- Date of birth: 18 November 1960 (age 65)
- Place of birth: Pelago, Italy
- Height: 1.81 m (5 ft 11 1/2 in)
- Position: Midfielder

Senior career*
Years	Team	Apps	(Gls)
1978–1982	Perugia	60	(1)
1982–1983	Pescara	21	(2)
1983–1984	Milan	12	(0)
1984–1987	Monza	67	(4)
1987–1990	Reggiana	69	(0)
1990–1991	Perugia	21	(0)
1991–1992	Catanzaro	32	(0)
1992–1993	Bastia Umbria	19	(?)
1993–1994	Ellera	25	(?)

International career
1980	Italy U-21	5	(0)
- * Club domestic league appearances and goals

Daniele Tacconi (born 18 November 1960 in Pelago) is a retired Italian professional football player.

Tacconi began his career with Perugia Calcio in the 1970s and 1980s.

He played for three seasons (56 games, one goal) in the Serie A for Perugia Calcio and A.C. Milan.

He represented Italy at the 1980 UEFA European Under-21 Football Championship.
