= Oscar Damiani =

Italian footballer and agent

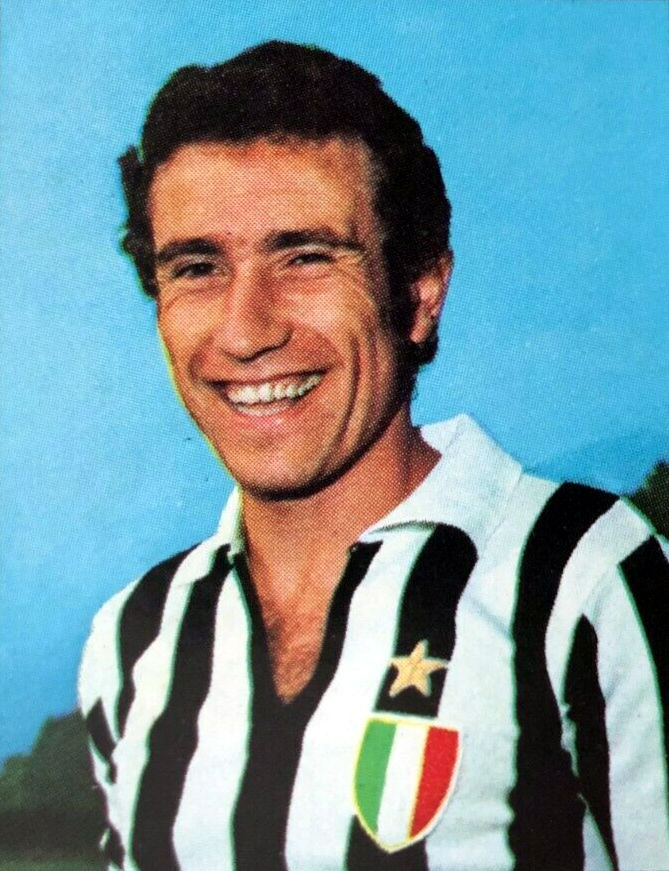
- Damiani with Juventus in 1975

Personal information
- Full name: Giuseppe Damiani
- Date of birth: 15 June 1950 (age 76)
- Place of birth: Brescia, Italy
- Height: 1.75 m (5 ft 9 in)
- Position: Right winger

Youth career
- Internazionale

Senior career*
Years	Team	Apps	(Gls)
1968–1969	Internazionale	0	(0)
1969–1972	Vicenza	68	(9)
1972–1973	Napoli	28	(5)
1973–1974	Vicenza	30	(5)
1974–1976	Juventus	47	(16)
1976–1979	Genoa	89	(35)
1979–1982	Napoli	72	(10)
1982–1984	Milan	55	(17)
1984	NY Cosmos	2	(0)
1984–1985	Parma	20	(3)
1985–1986	Lazio	14	(0)

International career
1969–1971	Italy U-21	3	(0)
1974	Italy	2	(0)
- * Club domestic league appearances and goals

Giuseppe "Oscar" Damiani (Italian pronunciation: [dʒuˈzɛppe ˈɔskar daˈmjaːni]; born 15 June 1950) is an Italian former professional football winger. He is currently the agent of Al-Qadsiah striker Pierre-Emerick Aubameyang.

== Honours ==
=== Club ===
Juventus

- Serie A: 1974–75

A.C. Milan

- Serie B: 1982–83

=== Individual ===
- Serie B top-scorer: 1978–79 (17 goals)
- Coppa Italia top-scorer: 1979–80 (six goals)
