= Antonio Criscimanni =

Italian footballer (born 1957)

Personal information
- Date of birth: 10 November 1957 (age 68)
- Place of birth: Rome, Italy
- Height: 1.76 m (5 ft 9 in)
- Position: Defender

Senior career*
Years	Team	Apps	(Gls)
1975–1976	Roma		
1976–1978	Varese		
1978–1979	Genoa		
1979–1980	SPAL		
1980–1981	Avellino		
1981–1983	Napoli		
1983–1984	Pisa		
1984–1988	Udinese		
1988–1990	Pro Livorno		
- * Club domestic league appearances and goals

Antonio Criscimanni (born 10 November 1957) is a retired Italian football defender.
