= Roberto Biffi =

Italian footballer and coach

Personal information
- Date of birth: August 21, 1965 (age 61)
- Place of birth: Milan, Italy
- Height: 1.85 m (6 ft 1 in)
- Position: Centre back

Team information
- Current team: Savona (head coach)

Youth career
- AC Milan

Senior career*
Years	Team	Apps	(Gls)
1982–1983	AC Milan	4	(0)
1983–1984	Foggia	16	(0)
1984–1985	Modena	21	(1)
1985–1986	Prato	19	(3)
1986	Parma	0	(0)
1986–1987	Mantova	17	(5)
1987–1988	Prato	23	(2)
1988–1999	Palermo	319	(15)
1999–2000	Fidelis Andria	15	(1)
2000–2003	Savona	62	(2)
2003–2005	Sanremese	29	(1)

Managerial career
- 2007: Sanremese
- 2008: Savona
- 2009–2011: Botev Plovdiv (Assistant)
- 2012: Imperia Calcio
- 2012–2013: Loanesi
- 2013–2015: Sestrese
- 2015–2016: Loanesi
- 2016–2018: Ospedaletti
- 2018–2019: Alassio
- 2021: Ospedaletti
- 2023–: Savona
- * Club domestic league appearances and goals

Roberto Biffi (born 21 August 1965) is an Italian professional football coach and former player. He played as a centre-back. He is the head coach of Prima Categoria amateurs Savona.

== Career ==
=== Player ===
A tough defender formed in the AC Milan youth system, Biffi made his professional debut with the Rossoneri during their 1982-1983 Serie B season, scoring a total of four first-team caps.

He then played for several Serie B and C teams before joining Palermo in 1988. He served a total of eleven seasons, all between Serie B and Serie C1, with the rosanero, often captaining his side. He left Palermo in 1999 at 34, after 319 appearances with the Sicilian side, which made him the player with the highest number of appearances with the rosanero jersey. He retired in 2005 after two seasons with Sanremese, without having ever played a single Serie A match.

=== Coach ===
In the summer of 2007, Roberto Biffi started a coaching career, being appointed at the helm of Serie D team Sanremese. He was, however, sacked only a few months later, in November, following a string of poor results.

He then started the 2008–09 season serving as head coach of Savona, another Ligurian Serie D team, but was fired in September 2008 after only six games, in which he managed to achieve only four points.

He also briefly worked as an assistant coach for Bulgarian Botev Plovdiv in 2009.

From 10 February 2012 to the end of the season, he was the last coach of the club of Imperia Calcio, in Eccellenza Liguria.

He successively served as head coach of several amateur clubs in Liguria, such as Loanesi (Promozione Liguria), Sestrese, Ospedaletti and Alassio (Eccellenza). In December 2023, he returned to Savona, in the Prima Categoria league.

== Sources ==
- Career profile
