= Paolo Benetti =

Italian footballer (born 1965)

Personal information
- Date of birth: 28 April 1965 (age 61)
- Place of birth: Cormano, Italy
- Position: Defender

Team information
- Current team: Roma (assistant)

Youth career
- Milan

Senior career*
| Years | Team | Apps | (Gls) |
| 1982–1983 | Milan | 1 | (0) |
| 1983–1984 | Fano | 12 | (0) |
| 1984–1987 | Catanzaro | 71 | (3) |
| 1987–1995 | Ascoli | 176 | (10) |
| 1995–1996 | Siena | 32 | (5) |
| 1996 | Venezia | 11 | (1) |
| 1997–1998 | Triestina | 38 | (3) |
| 1998–1999 | Carpi | 14 | (0) |

Managerial career
- 2012–2014: Monaco (assistant)
- 2015–2017: Leicester City (assistant)
- 2017–2018: Nantes (assistant)
- 2018–2019: Fulham (assistant)
- 2019: Roma (assistant)
- 2019–2021: Sampdoria (assistant)
- 2021–2022: Watford (assistant)
- 2023–2024: Cagliari (assistant)
- 2024–: Roma (assistant)
- * Club domestic league appearances and goals

Paolo Benetti (born 28 April 1965) is an Italian football manager and former player who is assistant coach of Serie A club Roma.

== Playing career ==
Benetti started his career with Serie A side Milan, where he made 1 league appearance and scored 0 goals. In 1983, he signed for Fano in the Italian third division. In 1987, Benetti signed for Serie A club Ascoli, where he suffered relegation to the Italian second division and received interest from Napoli in the Serie A, but manager Claudio Ranieri refused to sign him because they were brothers-in-law. In 1995, Benetti signed for Italian third division team Siena. In 1996, he signed for Venezia in the Italian second division. In 1997, he signed for Italian third division outfit Triestina.

== Managerial career ==
In 2012, Benetti was appointed assistant manager of French Ligue 1 side Monaco. In 2014, he was appointed technical coach of Greece. In 2015, he was appointed assistant manager of Leicester City in the English Premier League, helping them win their only top flight title. In 2017, Benetti was appointed assistant manager of French club Nantes.
