= Sergio Battistini =

Italian footballer (born 1963)

Personal information
- Date of birth: 7 May 1963 (age 63)
- Place of birth: Massa, Italy
- Position: Full-back

Senior career*
Years	Team	Apps	(Gls)
1980–1985	Milan	162	(29)
1985–1990	Fiorentina	127	(7)
1990–1994	Internazionale	112	(10)
1994–1996	Brescia	37	(2)
1996–1997	Spezia	17	(1)
Total		455	(49)

International career
1981–1984	Italy U-21	14	(1)
1984	Italy	4	(1)
- * Club domestic league appearances and goals

Sergio Battistini (Italian pronunciation: [ˈsɛrdʒo battiˈstiːni]; born 7 May 1963) is an Italian former professional association footballer who played as a defender or on occasion as a midfielder. He works as an association football manager.

== Club career ==
Battistini was born in Massa. Throughout his career, he played for several Italian clubs, such as A.C. Milan, Fiorentina, Inter Milan, Brescia, and Spezia, usually as a sweeper. After growing up in the Milan youth squad, alongside Alberigo Evani, he joined the Milan senior side in 1980, and played for the club during a difficult period in the club's history, only winning two Serie B titles in 1981 and 1983, and a Mitropa Cup in 1982. After leaving the club in 1985, he played with Fiorentina, where he reached the 1990 UEFA Cup Final during his final season with the club. He later won the trophy twice with Inter in 1991 and 1994, where he remained until 1994, before moving to Brescia for two seasons.

On 20 January 1985, in a league match against Udinese Calcio, Battistini suffered an injury and had to be substituted at half-time. His replacement was the legendary Italian defender Paolo Maldini, who made his Milan debut during the same match. Maldini remained at the club until 2009.

Following his retirement as a player after a single season with Spezia in 1997, Battistini pursued a coaching career.

== International career ==
At international level, Battistini represented the Italy Under-21 side 14 times under Azeglio Vicini, scoring 1 goal; he made his debut in 1981, and later represented his country at the 1984 Summer Olympics, where they managed a fourth-place finish. He made four appearances for the senior Italy national football team, all in 1984, scoring once. He made his international debut under Enzo Bearzot on 4 February 1984 in a 5–0 home win in an international friendly match against Mexico, played in Rome. He scored his only international goal in a 2–0 away win over Canada on 26 May 1984, in Toronto.

== Personal life ==
His son Matteo is also footballer.

== Honours ==
=== Club ===
Milan

- Serie B: 1980–81, 1982–83
- Mitropa Cup: 1981–82

Inter

- UEFA Cup: 1990–91, 1993–94
