= Vinicio Verza =

Italian footballer

Personal information
- Date of birth: 1 November 1957 (age 68)
- Place of birth: Boara Pisani, Italy
- Height: 1.78 m (5 ft 10 in)
- Position: Midfielder

Senior career*
Years	Team	Apps	(Gls)
1976–1977	L.R. Vicenza	22	(2)
1977–1981	Juventus	41	(7)
1981–1982	Cesena	24	(4)
1982–1985	Milan	81	(15)
1985–1988	Verona	67	(8)
1988–1989	Como	16	(0)
- * Club domestic league appearances and goals

Vinicio Verza (born 1 November 1957 in Boara Pisani) is a retired Italian professional footballer who played as a midfielder.

== Career ==
Verza began playing professional football with Juventus but did not initially feature for the first team. After a spell with lower-level side L.R. Vicenza, he returned to Juventus at the age of 20, where he would make his Serie A debut against rivals Fiorentina on 26 February 1978. He later occasionally wore the number 10 shirt for the club, and scored several decisive goals during the 1980–81 Serie A season, including one against Napoli at the San Paolo Stadium, contributing to the club's league title victory that year.

== Honours ==
Juventus

- Serie A champion: 1977–78, 1980–81.
- Coppa Italia winner: 1978–79.
