= Giuseppe Incocciati =

Italian footballer and manager

Personal information
- Date of birth: 16 November 1963 (age 62)
- Place of birth: Fiuggi, Italy
- Height: 1.76 m (5 ft 9 1/2 in)
- Position: Striker

Senior career*
Years	Team	Apps	(Gls)
1981–1985	Milan	73	(8)
1985–1986	Ascoli	33	(10)
1986–1988	Atalanta	30	(5)
1987–1988	→ Empoli (loan)	22	(2)
1988–1990	Pisa	62	(19)
1990–1991	Napoli	23	(7)
1991–1993	Bologna	62	(17)
1993–1995	Ascoli	30	(2)

International career
1982	Italy U-21	1	(0)

Managerial career
- 2007–2008: Cisco Roma (youth)
- 2008: Avellino
- 2009–2011: Cisco Roma
- 2015–2016: Martina Franca
- 2019–2021: Atletico Terme Fiuggi
- * Club domestic league appearances and goals

Giuseppe Incocciati (born 16 November 1963 in Fiuggi) is an Italian professional football coach and a former professional player who played as a forward.

== Playing career ==
As a player, he played 7 seasons (139 games, 23 goals) in the Serie A for A.C. Milan, Atalanta B.C., Empoli F.C., Pisa Calcio and S.S.C. Napoli.

== Managerial career ==
After a stint as youth coach of Cisco Roma, he was hired as Avellino head coach in 2008 for a short period.

He returned at Cisco Roma the following year, this time as head coach, with whom he won promotion to Lega Pro Prima Divisione by the end of the season. He resigned in April 2011, with the club (now named Atletico Roma) fighting for a promotion playoff spot.

He served as head coach of Martina Franca in 2015–16.

In July 2019, he was named new head coach of hometown Serie D club Atletico Terme Fiuggi.

== Honours ==
Milan

- Mitropa Cup: 1982

Napoli

- Supercoppa Italiana: 1990
