= Gabriello Carotti =

Italian former footballer

Personal information
- Date of birth: November 25, 1960 (age 65)
- Place of birth: Orbetello, Italy
- Height: 1.72 m (5 ft 7 1/2 in)
- Position: Midfielder

Youth career
- Milan

Senior career*
Years	Team	Apps	(Gls)
1977–1981	Milan	33	(3)
1981–1983	Ascoli	48	(4)
1983–1986	Milan	30	(5)
1986–1987	L.R. Vicenza	22	(3)
1987–1988	Reggiana	15	(3)
1990–1991	Gallaratese	21	(8)
1992–1993	Orbetello		
1996–1997	Orbetello		
- * Club domestic league appearances and goals

Gabriello Carotti (born November 25, 1960, in Orbetello) is an Italian former footballer who played as a midfielder. He made 169 appearances in the Italian professional leagues, and played for 6 seasons (94 games, 11 goals) in Serie A for Milan and Ascoli.
