= Giulio Nuciari =

Italian footballer (born 1960)

Personal information
- Date of birth: 26 April 1960 (age 66)
- Place of birth: Piovene Rocchette, Italy
- Height: 1.80 m (5 ft 11 in)
- Position: Goalkeeper

Senior career*
Years	Team	Apps	(Gls)
1978–1979	Ternana	0	(0)
1979–1980	Montecatini (loan)	30	(0)
1980–1982	Ternana	68	(0)
1982–1988	Milan	28	(0)
1988–1989	Monza	37	(0)
1989–1995	Sampdoria	7	(0)

Managerial career
- 1995–1997: Sampdoria (goalkeeper coach)
- 1997–1998: Milan (goalkeeper coach)
- 1999–2000: Cagliari (goalkeeper coach)
- 2000–2001: Ternana (goalkeeper coach)
- 2001: Cagliari (goalkeeper coach)
- 2001: Cagliari
- 2002–2004: Lazio (goalkeeper coach)
- 2004–2008: Inter (goalkeeper coach)
- 2010–2013: Fiorentina (goalkeeper coach)
- 2012: Fiorentina (assistant coach)
- 2014: Inter (goalkeeper coach)
- 2014–2016: Inter (assistant coach)
- 2018–: Italy (assistant coach)
- * Club domestic league appearances and goals

Giulio Nuciari (born 26 April 1960) is an Italian football coach and former player who played as a goalkeeper.

== Career ==
Nuciari was born in Piovene Rocchette, Province of Vicenza. He started his playing career with Montecatini, on loan from Ternana. After two seasons with Ternana, he signed for A.C. Milan where he served as backup goalkeeper, making 28 league appearances in six seasons, with 18 of them in his first season. After a season as first-choice keeper for Monza, he then signed for Sampdoria, where he was again a backup, behind Gianluca Pagliuca (1989–1994) and then Walter Zenga (1994–1995). He retired in 1995, and then obtained a coaching license. In October 2001 he was surprisingly appointed head coach of Serie B club Cagliari, but he lasted only two months before being sacked on December of the same year.

In 2003, his former Sampdoria teammate Roberto Mancini called him to work as goalkeeping coach of his club Lazio. Nuciari followed Mancini to Inter in 2004, and stayed at the club until 2008, when Mancini and his coaching staff were dismissed by the club. In 2010 work as goalkeeping coach for Fiorentina with Siniša Mihajlović.

Nuciari is the titular of an original record for Serie A, as player with the highest number of appearances on the bench (333). Despite this, he played only a total 17 Serie A matches throughout his career.
