= Walter Novellino =

Italian footballer & manager (born 1953)

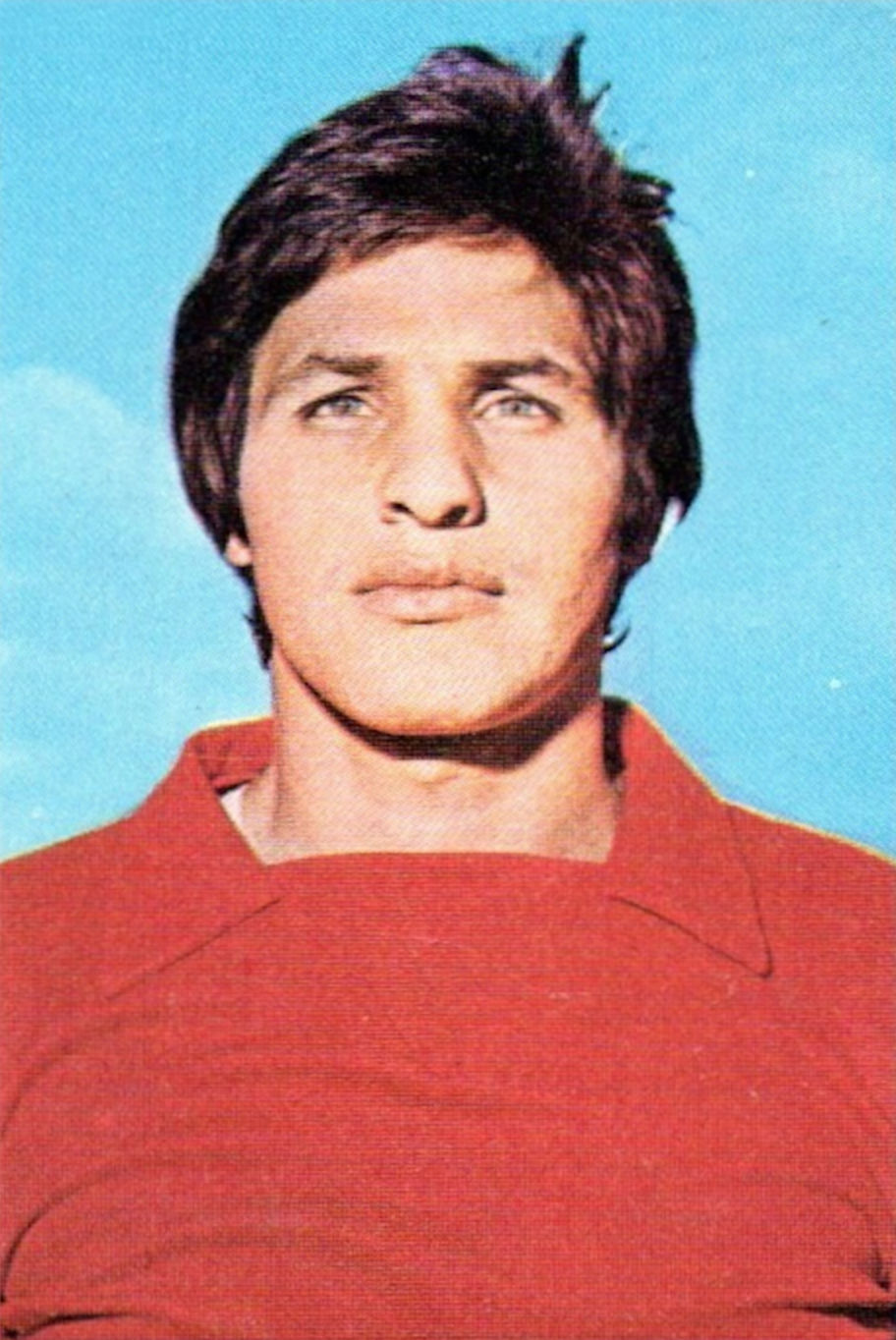
- Novellino with Perugia in 1975

Personal information
- Full name: Alfredo Walter Amato Lenin Novellino
- Date of birth: 4 June 1953 (age 73)
- Place of birth: Montemarano, Italy
- Position: Midfielder

Youth career
- Torino

Senior career*
Years	Team	Apps	(Gls)
1970–1971	Torino	0	(0)
1971–1972	Legnano	37	(1)
1972–1973	Torino	1	(0)
1973–1974	Cremonese	30	(2)
1974–1975	Empoli	36	(5)
1975–1978	Perugia	81	(11)
1978–1982	AC Milan	120	(10)
1982–1984	Ascoli	59	(12)
1984–1986	Perugia	51	(1)
1986–1987	Catania	16	(0)
Total		431	(42)

International career
1978	Italy	1	(0)

Managerial career
- 1992–1993: Perugia
- 1993–1995: Gualdo
- 1995: Perugia
- 1996–1997: Ravenna
- 1997–1999: Venezia
- 1999–2000: Napoli
- 2000–2002: Piacenza
- 2002–2007: Sampdoria
- 2007–2008: Torino
- 2008–2009: Torino
- 2009: Reggina
- 2011: Livorno
- 2013–2015: Modena
- 2016: Palermo
- 2016–2018: Avellino
- 2019: Catania
- 2021: Juve Stabia
- 2022: Juve Stabia
- 2023: Juve Stabia
- * Club domestic league appearances and goals

Walter Novellino (born 4 June 1953; Italian pronunciation: [ˈvalter novelˈliːno]), is an Italian football manager and former player, who played as a midfielder.

== Club career ==
Novellino was born at Montemarano, province of Avellino. After spending his childhood in São Paulo, Brazil, he later returned to Italy, and started his professional career with Torino, then obtaining his major successes with Perugia and AC Milan, and being nicknamed Monzon (after an Argentine boxer) due to both his physical resemblance to him and his determination on the pitch. Novellino announced his retirement in 1987. In his first season with Milan, he helped the club to their tenth Serie A title in 1979. When the club was relegated following their involvement in the Totonero 1980 match-fixing scandal, he remained with the team and helped Milan win the Serie B title and immediately obtain promotion back to Serie A; during the 1980–81 Serie B season, he notably scored the goal against Monza which secured promotion for the club.

== International career ==
Novellino won one cap for the Italy national team in 1978.

== Style of play ==
Novellino was known for his technical ability, offensive capabilities, and dribbling skills. Although he was usually played as an attacking midfielder, he was also capable of playing as a winger, as a second striker, or as a forward.

== Managerial career ==
Novellino debuted in management in 1992 with Perugia of Serie C1, but this was short-lived. Next season, he moved to Gualdo whom he led in two years to win first Serie C2 and then to a spot in the Serie C1 promotion play-off finals which they eventually lost to Avellino. He then went on to Serie B sides Perugia, Ravenna and then in Venezia whom he led to Serie A for the first time in the club history.

In 2000, he led Napoli to a Serie A promotion, and repeated the feat the following season with Piacenza. In 2002, he joined Sampdoria, immediately leading the team to a Serie A promotion, the fourth time he'd helped a team achieve this goal. In his first Serie A season with Sampdoria, they achieved a 5th place and a UEFA Cup qualification, but lost the battle with Udinese for the last UEFA Champions League place. He left Sampdoria in 2007 to join Torino, where he was fired on 16 April 2008 following disappointing results that left the team in the relegation zone; he was replaced by Gianni De Biasi who ultimately managed to save the granata from relegation.

On 8 December, only a few months after his dismissal, he was called back to Torino following the sacking of De Biasi, taking over the team in 18th place and 12 only points achieved in 15 games. He was fired once again on 24 March 2009, after a sequence of negative results that left Torino in deep relegation zone, being replaced by Giancarlo Camolese.

In July 2009 he was appointed new head coach of Reggina, with the aim to lead the Calabrians promptly back to the top flight. However, he managed to achieve only nine points in ten games, being ultimately dismissed on 24 October following a 2–0 loss to his former club Torino.

On 14 February 2011, he was unveiled as new head coach of Serie B club Livorno, replacing Giuseppe Pillon at the helm of the Amaranto, until 21 December 2011 when he rescinds the contract by mutual agreement with the company.

On 10 March 2016, he was appointed Palermo manager. He was sacked on 11 April 2016.

On 29 November 2016, he was called in by struggling Serie B side Avellino to replace the outcoming manager Domenico Toscano. Avellino dismissed him on 3 April 2018.

On 1 July 2021, he was hired by Serie C's Juve Stabia to be the club's new manager. He was sacked on 17 October 2021 following a negative start in the 2021–22 Serie C campaign. On 28 February 2022, he was reinstated as Juve Stabia boss following the dismissal of Stefano Sottili, who had replaced him earlier during the season. He left Juve Stabia once again after the 2021–22 season.

On 20 March 2023, Novellino returned to Juve Stabia, accepting to become the third manager of the season for the Gialloblu. After a lacklustre end of season, on 10 June 2023 Juve Stabia announced to have parted company with Novellino.

== Style of management ==
Novellino favours a 4–4–2 formation which makes use of a zonal marking defensive system, a deep-lying playmaker in midfield, and a physical centre forward fielded alongside a more mobile and talented second striker.

== Managerial statistics ==
As of 5 May 2019

Managerial record by team and tenure
Team	From	To	Record							
Team	From	To	G	W	D	L	GF	GA	GD	Win %
Perugia	3 December 1992	23 June 1993	22	10	7	5	31	20	+11	45.45
Gualdo	23 June 1993	1 July 1995	87	42	29	16	120	55	+65	48.28
Perugia	1 July 1995	26 September 1995	8	2	3	3	8	8	+0	25.00
Ravenna	2 June 1996	18 June 1997	40	15	13	12	46	37	+9	37.50
Venezia	18 June 1997	15 June 1999	80	31	26	23	99	85	+14	38.75
Napoli	15 June 1999	13 June 2000	48	22	14	12	69	54	+15	45.83
Piacenza	13 June 2000	4 June 2002	83	36	23	24	113	81	+32	43.37
Sampdoria	4 June 2002	31 May 2007	220	85	70	65	271	233	+38	38.64
Torino	6 June 2007	15 April 2008	36	8	16	12	38	49	−11	22.22
Torino	8 December 2008	24 March 2009	16	3	6	7	13	24	−11	18.75
Reggina	11 June 2009	24 October 2009	12	4	3	5	11	15	−4	33.33
Livorno	14 February 2011	21 December 2011	38	12	11	15	37	36	+1	31.58
Modena	20 March 2013	28 February 2015	86	29	33	24	108	83	+25	33.72
Palermo	10 March 2016	12 April 2016	4	0	1	3	1	7	−6	0.00
Avellino	28 November 2016	4 April 2018	61	18	21	22	75	87	−12	29.51
Catania	27 February 2019	6 May 2019	10	4	3	3	10	11	−1	40.00
Career total			851	321	279	251	1,050	885	+165	37.72

== Honours ==
=== Player ===
AC Milan

- Serie A (1): 1978–79
- Serie B (1): 1980–81
- Mitropa Cup (1): 1981–82

Perugia

- Coppa Piano Karl Rappan (1): 1978

=== Manager ===
Gualdo

- Serie C2 (1): 1993–94 (girone B)

=== Individual ===
- AC Milan Hall of Fame
