= 1983–84 Serie A =

82nd season of top-tier Italian football

Serie A
- Season: 1983–84
- Dates: 11 September 1983 – 13 May 1984
- Champions: Juventus; 21st title
- Relegated: Genoa; Pisa; Catania
- European Cup: Juventus
- Cup Winners' Cup: Roma
- UEFA Cup: Fiorentina; Internazionale
- Matches: 240
- Goals: 573 (2.39 per match)
- Top goalscorer: Michel Platini (20 goals)

Serie A 1983-84 team distribution

The 1983–84 Serie A season was won by Juventus. It was a tight championship, with reigning champions Roma providing strong opposition to the Bianconeri, who obtained the point they needed by drawing 1-1 against Avellino on 6 May, taking the title with one match to spare.

== Teams ==
Milan, Lazio and Catania had been promoted from Serie B.

== Final classification ==
Pos	Team	Pld	W	D	L	GF	GA	GD	Pts	Qualification or relegation
1	Juventus (C)	30	17	9	4	57	29	+28	43	Qualification to European Cup
2	Roma	30	15	11	4	48	28	+20	41	Qualification to Cup Winners' Cup
3	Fiorentina	30	12	12	6	48	31	+17	36	Qualification to UEFA Cup
4	Internazionale	30	12	11	7	37	23	+14	35	Qualification to UEFA Cup
5	Torino	30	11	11	8	37	30	+7	33	
6	Milan	30	10	12	8	37	40	−3	32	
7	Sampdoria	30	12	8	10	36	30	+6	32	
8	Hellas Verona	30	12	8	10	43	35	+8	32	
9	Udinese	30	11	9	10	47	40	+7	31	
10	Ascoli	30	9	11	10	29	35	−6	29	
11	Napoli	30	7	12	11	28	38	−10	26	
12	Avellino	30	9	8	13	33	39	−6	26	
13	Lazio	30	8	9	13	35	49	−14	25 (Note: Position defined by head-to-head points: Lazio: 3 pts; Genoa: 1 pt.)	
14	Genoa (R)	30	6	13	11	24	36	−12	25	Relegation to Serie B
15	Pisa (R)	30	3	16	11	20	35	−15	22	Relegation to Serie B
16	Catania (R)	30	1	10	19	14	55	−41	12	Relegation to Serie B

Source: RSSSF.com
Rules for classification: 1) Points; 2) Head-to-head points; 3) Head-to-head goal difference; 4) Goal difference; 5) Goals scored; 6) Draw. (Note: Head-to-head record is used only after all the matches between the teams in question have been played).
(C) Champions; (R) Relegated

== Results ==
Home \ Away	ASC	AVE	CAT	FIO	GEN	INT	JUV	LAZ	MIL	NAP	PIS	ROM	SAM	TOR	UDI	VER
Ascoli	—	4–1	2–1	1–2	0–0	1–0	0–0	2–0	2–4	2–2	3–2	0–0	0–1	0–0	1–0	2–1
Avellino	2–1	—	0–0	0–0	3–1	1–1	1–2	3–0	4–0	1–0	1–1	2–2	0–2	0–0	2–1	1–0
Catania	1–1	1–1	—	0–2	1–2	0–0	0–2	1–1	1–1	0–0	2–0	2–2	1–1	0–0	0–2	0–1
Fiorentina	2–1	1–0	5–0	—	0–0	1–1	3–3	3–2	2–2	5–1	0–0	0–0	3–0	4–1	0–0	2–0
Genoa	1–0	0–2	3–0	2–2	—	1–1	2–1	0–0	2–0	0–0	0–0	0–2	0–0	2–1	0–5	1–1
Internazionale	0–0	3–0	6–0	2–1	1–1	—	1–2	1–1	2–0	1–0	3–0	1–0	1–2	0–0	2–0	1–0
Juventus	7–0	1–1	2–0	1–0	4–2	2–0	—	2–1	2–1	2–0	3–1	2–2	1–2	2–1	3–2	3–1
Lazio	2–1	2–1	3–0	1–2	2–1	3–0	0–1	—	0–0	3–2	0–1	0–2	2–1	1–0	2–2	1–1
Milan	0–0	1–0	2–1	2–2	1–0	0–0	0–3	4–1	—	0–2	2–1	1–1	2–1	0–1	3–3	4–2
Napoli	1–0	2–0	3–0	0–0	0–0	0–2	1–1	3–0	0–0	—	0–0	1–2	1–1	0–0	2–1	1–0
Pisa	0–1	1–0	2–0	1–1	1–1	0–0	0–0	2–2	0–0	1–1	—	1–1	0–0	1–1	1–1	0–3
Roma	1–1	3–2	1–0	2–1	1–0	1–0	0–0	2–2	3–1	5–1	2–0	—	1–1	2–1	4–1	3–2
Sampdoria	1–2	0–1	2–0	1–2	2–0	0–2	1–1	1–1	1–1	4–1	1–0	1–2	—	2–1	2–1	1–0
Torino	0–0	4–2	2–0	1–0	2–1	3–1	2–1	4–0	1–2	2–1	2–2	2–1	2–1	—	0–1	1–1
Udinese	0–0	2–1	3–1	3–1	3–1	2–2	2–2	2–0	1–2	4–1	2–1	1–0	0–3	0–0	—	1–1
Hellas Verona	3–1	3–0	3–1	3–1	0–0	1–2	2–1	4–2	1–1	1–1	2–0	1–0	1–0	2–2	2–1	—

Legend: Blue = home team win; Yellow = draw; Red = away team win.

== Top goalscorers ==
Rank	Player	Club	Goals
1	(France) Michel Platini	Juventus	20
2	(Brazil) Zico	Udinese	19
3	(Italy) Maurizio Iorio	Hellas Verona	14
4	(Italy) Paolo Rossi	Juventus	13
5	(Italy) Massimo Briaschi	Genoa	12
5	(Italy) Paolo Monelli	Fiorentina	12
7	(Argentina) Patricio Hernandez	Torino	11
8	(Italy) Alessandro Altobelli	Internazionale	11
8	(Argentina) Daniel Bertoni	Fiorentina	11
8	(Italy) Pietro Paolo Virdis	Udinese	11

== Attendances ==
No.	Club	Average
1	Napoli	55,590
2	Milan	53,136
3	Roma	52,793
4	Lazio	46,908
5	Fiorentina	45,723
6	Juventus	43,574
7	Internazionale	43,388
8	Udinese	41,349
9	Torino	31,946
10	Hellas Verona	31,238
11	Sampdoria	30,162
12	Genoa	26,706
13	Avellino	23,504
14	Catania	20,610
15	Ascoli	19,326
16	Pisa	18,879

== References and sources ==
- Almanacco Illustrato del Calcio - La Storia 1898-2004, Panini Edizioni, Modena, September 2005
