= Andrea Icardi =

Italian footballer and manager (born 1963)

Personal information
- Date of birth: 14 June 1963 (age 63)
- Place of birth: Milan, Italy
- Height: 1.71 m (5 ft 7 in)
- Position: Midfielder

Senior career*
Years	Team	Apps	(Gls)
1980–1986	Milan	141	(5)
1986–1988	Atalanta	56	(0)
1988–1990	Lazio	53	(0)
1990–1993	Verona	78	(0)
1993–1994	Marconi Stallions	6	(3)

International career
1983–1984	Italy U-21	9	(0)

Managerial career
- Milan (youth)
- Monza (youth)
- Alessandria (youth)
- Derthona
- Voghera
- * Club domestic league appearances and goals

Andrea Icardi (born 14 June 1963) is an Italian professional football coach and a former player, who played as a midfielder.

Icardi played 6 seasons for A.C. Milan in the first half of the 1980s, when the club was yo-yoing between Serie A and Serie B. He then spent two seasons at Atalanta B.C., two at S.S. Lazio and three at Hellas Verona F.C. before relocating to Sydney, Australia where he played for Marconi Stallions FC.

After he retired, Icardi coached teams in Italy. Since 2007, he is back in Sydney where he is director of the Milan Soccer Academy Australia.

== Honours ==
Milan

- Mitropa Cup winner: 1982.
