= 1982–83 Serie B =

Italian football league season

Serie B
- Season: 1982–83
- Champions: Milan; 2nd title

Serie B 1982-83 team distribution

The Serie B 1982–83 was the fifty-first tournament of this competition played in Italy since its creation.

== Teams ==
Atalanta, Monza, Arezzo and Campobasso had been promoted from Serie C, while Milan, Bologna and Como had been relegated from Serie A.

== Final classification ==
Pos	Team	Pld	W	D	L	GF	GA	GD	Pts	Promotion or relegation
1	Milan (C, P)	38	19	16	3	77	36	+41	54	Promotion to Serie A
2	Lazio (P)	38	14	18	6	44	32	+12	46	Promotion to Serie A
3	Catania (P)	38	14	17	7	37	21	+16	45	Serie A after tie-breaker
4	Cremonese	38	13	19	6	42	28	+14	45	Promotion tie-breaker
5	Como	38	13	19	6	36	24	+12	45	Promotion tie-breaker
6	Cavese	38	12	18	8	38	37	+1	42	
7	Monza	38	13	12	13	40	42	−2	38	
8	Atalanta	38	10	17	11	30	27	+3	37	
8	Sambenedettese	38	10	17	11	33	32	+1	37	
8	Varese	38	9	19	10	31	37	−6	37	
11	Perugia	38	11	14	13	36	37	−1	36	
11	Arezzo	38	10	16	12	30	38	−8	36	
11	Campobasso	38	9	18	11	26	34	−8	36	
14	Pistoiese	38	7	20	11	33	34	−1	34	
14	Palermo	38	11	12	15	36	46	−10	34	
14	Lecce	38	10	14	14	33	44	−11	34	
17	Bologna (R)	38	9	14	15	31	47	−16	32	Relegation to Serie C1
18	Reggiana (R)	38	6	20	12	39	49	−10	32	Relegation to Serie C1
19	Foggia (R)	38	8	14	16	24	35	−11	30	Relegation to Serie C1
20	Bari (R)	38	9	12	17	30	46	−16	30	Relegation to Serie C1

Source: head-to-head points used in event of equal points in relegation zone.
(C) Champions; (P) Promoted; (R) Relegated

== Results ==
Home \ Away	ARE	ATA	BAR	BOL	CAM	CAT	CAV	COM	CRE	FOG	LAZ	LEC	MIL	MON	PAL	PER	PIS	REG	SAM	VAR
Arezzo	—	1–0	0–0	0–1	0–0	2–2	2–0	1–0	1–1	0–0	0–0	1–1	2–2	1–0	1–0	1–1	1–1	2–2	1–0	0–0
Atalanta	1–1	—	1–0	3–0	2–1	0–1	2–1	0–0	1–1	1–0	1–1	2–0	2–2	0–0	2–0	0–0	1–0	5–1	0–0	0–0
Bari	0–0	0–0	—	1–0	0–0	1–0	3–1	1–2	0–1	2–1	0–3	1–2	1–4	0–1	1–0	3–1	2–0	2–1	1–2	2–2
Bologna	1–0	0–1	1–1	—	0–0	1–1	1–1	0–1	0–0	0–0	2–1	2–0	1–3	2–2	1–3	3–1	1–0	2–1	1–1	1–0
Campobasso	0–2	1–0	0–0	2–2	—	0–0	1–1	0–0	1–1	1–0	1–0	1–0	0–2	1–0	1–1	0–0	2–1	1–1	1–0	3–2
Catania	3–0	0–0	3–0	2–1	1–0	—	2–0	0–0	0–0	2–1	1–1	2–0	1–1	2–0	2–0	2–1	1–1	0–0	1–1	0–0
Cavese	0–0	1–0	2–0	1–0	0–0	1–0	—	0–0	0–0	1–0	2–2	1–1	2–2	1–0	1–1	2–1	0–0	3–1	1–0	1–0
Como	0–1	1–0	3–1	2–0	2–1	1–0	3–0	—	0–0	0–0	0–0	2–0	1–0	0–0	1–1	2–2	1–0	1–1	2–0	2–2
Cremonese	1–0	3–1	1–1	4–0	2–1	0–1	2–2	1–0	—	0–0	0–1	2–0	3–3	1–0	2–0	2–2	0–0	1–1	2–0	0–0
Foggia	3–1	2–1	2–1	1–1	0–0	0–0	0–0	1–1	2–1	—	0–2	3–0	1–1	0–0	2–0	1–0	0–0	2–2	1–0	0–1
Lazio	2–0	2–1	1–0	1–1	0–0	2–1	1–1	2–2	1–0	0–0	—	3–0	2–2	1–1	1–0	2–0	1–2	3–3	1–1	2–0
Lecce	2–1	1–1	1–1	1–3	3–0	0–1	1–0	2–1	1–2	2–0	0–0	—	1–1	1–1	3–0	0–0	0–0	2–1	1–1	3–2
Milan	2–1	1–0	3–1	5–0	0–0	0–0	1–2	2–0	1–1	2–0	5–1	4–2	—	4–0	2–0	2–1	2–1	3–0	2–2	3–0
Monza	2–1	1–0	1–0	2–1	2–1	0–0	2–2	1–1	1–2	2–0	2–0	1–1	1–4	—	5–1	0–1	1–1	2–0	1–0	3–0
Palermo	0–1	3–0	1–1	2–0	1–1	0–0	1–1	1–0	3–2	1–0	0–0	2–0	0–0	3–1	—	0–0	3–2	1–1	1–1	1–0
Perugia	3–0	1–1	0–2	0–0	3–0	1–1	1–0	0–1	0–1	1–0	1–1	1–0	3–2	2–1	2–0	—	2–2	1–0	0–0	1–0
Pistoiese	3–1	0–0	3–0	1–0	1–1	1–0	1–1	1–1	0–0	2–0	0–1	0–1	0–0	0–1	1–2	0–0	—	1–0	1–1	2–2
Reggiana	1–1	0–0	0–0	0–0	0–1	1–0	4–3	1–1	1–1	2–1	0–0	0–0	2–3	4–1	3–1	2–1	1–1	—	0–0	0–1
Samb.	2–0	0–0	2–0	2–1	2–1	1–3	0–1	1–1	1–0	3–0	0–1	0–0	1–1	2–0	2–1	1–0	1–1	1–1	—	0–1
Varese	1–2	0–0	0–0	0–0	2–1	2–1	1–1	0–0	1–1	1–0	2–1	0–0	0–0	1–1	2–1	2–1	2–2	0–0	1–1	—

Legend: Blue = home team win; Yellow = draw; Red = away team win.

== Promotion tie-breaker ==
Team 1	Score	Team 2
Catania (Italy)	1-0	(Italy) Como
Cremonese (Italy)	0-0	(Italy) Como
Catania (Italy)	0-0	(Italy) Cremonese

Catania promoted to Serie A.

== Attendances ==
#	Club	Average
1	Milan	35,111
2	Lazio	34,234
3	Catania	19,178
4	Palermo	16,135
5	Bologna	15,517
6	Atalanta	14,226
7	Bari	12,628
8	Foggia	11,792
9	Perugia	11,079
10	Reggiana	10,604
11	Cremonese	9,681
12	Lecce	8,824
13	Arezzo	8,761
14	Pistoiese	8,709
15	Cavese	8,135
16	Varese	7,581
17	Sambenedettese	7,397
18	Como	6,957
19	Campobasso	6,595
20	Monza	4,099

== References and sources ==
- Almanacco Illustrato del Calcio - La Storia 1898-2004, Panini Edizioni, Modena, September 2005
