= Alberico Evani =

Italian footballer and manager (born 1963)

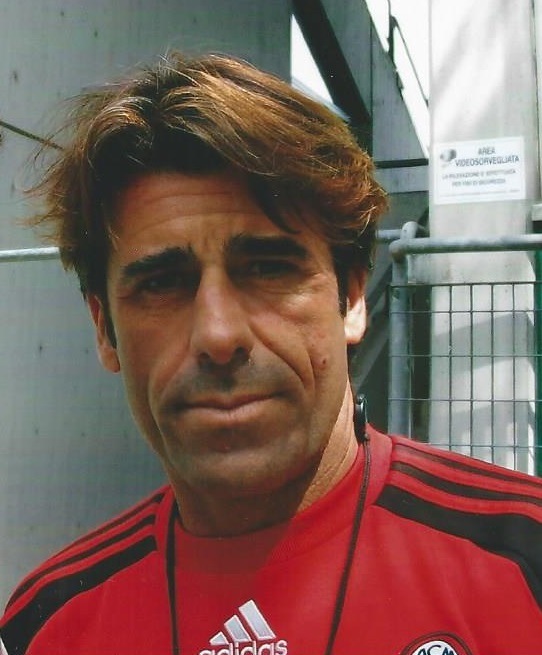
- Evani in 2007

Personal information
- Date of birth: 1 January 1963 (age 63)
- Place of birth: Massa, Italy
- Height: 1.74 m (5 ft 9 in)
- Position: Midfielder

Youth career
- AC Milan

Senior career*
| Years | Team | Apps | (Gls) |
| 1980–1993 | AC Milan | 296 | (14) |
| 1993–1997 | Sampdoria | 94 | (2) |
| 1997–1998 | Reggiana | 7 | (0) |
| 1998–1999 | Carrarese | 12 | (1) |
| Total | | 409 | (17) |

International career
| 1982–1984 | Italy U21 | 6 | (1) |
| 1991–1994 | Italy | 15 | (0) |

Managerial career
- 2009–2010: San Marino Calcio
- 2010–2013: Italy U18
- 2011–2013: Italy U19
- 2013–2017: Italy U20
- 2018–2023: Italy (assistant)
- 2025: Sampdoria
Medal record
Men's football
Representing Italy
FIFA World Cup
| Runner-up | 1994 |
- * Club domestic league appearances and goals

Alberico Evani (Italian pronunciation: [albeˈriːko eˈvaːni]; born 1 January 1963), sometimes misspelled as Alberigo Evani, is an Italian football manager and former player, who was deployed as a midfielder. He started his club career with AC Milan, where he spent the majority of his playing career, winning several trophies during his 13 seasons at the club, including, three Serie A titles and two European Cups; he later also played for Sampdoria, Reggiana, and Carrarese. At international level, he represented Italy at the 1994 FIFA World Cup, where they reached the final.

== Club career ==
Born in Massa, Tuscany, Evani played in Serie A 353 times with 16 goals. After starting out in the A.C. Milan youth academy, he was promoted to the A.C. Milan senior team, where he developed into a quick left-sided midfielder, with good technique. Although he was not as fast or as skilful as some of Milan's more notable players at the time, Evani's consistency, work-rate, and versatility along the left wing proved vital to the Milan senior team, especially during Arrigo Sacchi's reign, and subsequently under Fabio Capello.

Evani was handed his debut at the age of 18 in 1981, going on to wear the Rossoneri shirt for the next 13 years. His honours while at Milan included two promotions from Serie B, three Serie A titles, two European Cups, two Italian Super Cups, two European Super Cups and two Intercontinental Cups, scoring the winner against Atlético Nacional in their 1989 triumph, winning the "Man of the Match Award". He left Milan in 1993 to join Sampdoria, the club with which he won the Coppa Italia in 1994, staying there for four years until moving to Serie B side Reggiana in 1997, and ending his career at Carrarese in 1998, in Serie C1.

== International career ==
Evani had represented the Italy under-21 side, and the Italy under-23 side at the 1988 Olympics, where they reached the semi-finals, finishing in fourth place. When Sacchi was appointed as Italy coach, Evani became regular member of the Italy national side; in total he made 15 appearances for Italy. He made his debut for Italy on 21 December 1991 in a 2–0 win over Cyprus. He subsequently represented his country at the 1994 FIFA World Cup, appearing in Italy's opening defeat to Ireland, and scoring a penalty kick in the shootout loss to Brazil in the final.

== Style of play ==
Although Evani was not gifted with outstanding pace for a winger, or the ability to wizard his way past defenders with elaborate feints, he developed into a dynamic and skilful left-sided midfielder, whose speed, discipline and dependable qualities proved vital to the success of the Milan senior team during the late 80s and early 90s; his technique, distribution, crossing ability, and in particular his tendency to make attacking runs along the left flank enabled him to excel in this position. Due to his tactical intelligence, versatility, positional sense, professionalism, stamina, and defensive work-rate, he was also capable of holding his position and covering defensively for the overlapping runs of the attacking full-backs, or for the late runs of his other midfield teammates; these qualities also made him capable of playing as a full-back, a position which he frequently occupied earlier on in his career. He was even used as a central midfielder in his later career, after losing some of his pace, due to his ability to start attacking plays with his passing. Evani was also an accurate set-piece taker, and possessed a powerful shot from outside the area. Throughout his career Evani was nicknamed "Bubu," because of his apparent similarity to Yogi Bear’s sidekick Boo-Boo.

== Managerial career ==
After his retirement, Evani returned to A.C. Milan, serving as youth team coach for the Allievi Nazionali (16- to 17-year-old players), being crowned as national champions in 2007, then starting undertaking coaching qualifications. In June 2009 he was announced as new head coach of Lega Pro Seconda Divisione club San Marino Calcio. He was removed from his coaching post in April 2010 despite being in second place with his team, citing internal problems within the team and difficult relationships with the board as the main reasons for his dismissal.

In August 2010 Evani was appointed head coach of the Italy U18.

On 6 August 2013, Evani was appointed the coach of Italy U20.

On 6 February 2018, Evani was appointed the caretaker manager of Italy U21 for March friendlies against Norway and Serbia, while Luigi Di Biagio was appointed caretaker manager of the senior Italy national team until Di Biagio returned on 15 May. Later that month, senior side coach Roberto Mancini named Evani an assistant coach. In November 2020, after Mancini tested positive for COVID-19 amid its pandemic in Italy, Evani became the stand in manager for a friendly match against Estonia (4–0 win), and the final two 2020–21 UEFA Nations League A matches against Poland and Bosnia and Herzegovina.

On 7 April 2025, Evani was hired as the new head coach of Serie B club Sampdoria, returning to the Blucerchiati with the goal to save the team from relegation, with Mancini's former coaching staff of Attilio Lombardo, Angelo Gregucci and Paolo Bertelli alongside him. He eventually achieved that result, after defeating Salernitana in a two-legged relegation playoff; however, despite that, he was not confirmed in charge of Sampdoria and departed by the end of the season, together with his staff.

== Managerial statistics ==
As of match played 22 June 2025

Managerial record by team and tenure
| Team | From | To | Record | | | | | | | |
| Team | From | To | G | W | D | L | GF | GA | GD | Win % |
|---|---|---|---|---|---|---|---|---|---|---|
| Sampdoria | 7 April 2025 | 30 June 2025 | 8 | 4 | 3 | 1 | 8 | 3 | +5 | 50.00 |

== Honours ==
=== Player ===
Milan

- Serie A: 1987–88, 1991–92, 1992–93
- Serie B: 1980–81, 1982–83
- Supercoppa Italiana: 1988, 1992, 1993
- European Cup: 1988–89, 1989–90
- European Super Cup: 1989, 1990
- Intercontinental Cup: 1989, 1990

Sampdoria

- Coppa Italia: 1993–94

Italy

- FIFA World Cup runner-up: 1994

Individual

- Intercontinental Cup Man of the Match: 1989
- A.C. Milan Hall of Fame

=== Manager ===
Milan

- Campionato Allievi Nazionali: 2006–07
