= Ottorino Piotti =

Italian footballer (born 1954)

Personal information
- Full name: Ottorino Piotti
- Date of birth: 31 July 1954 (age 72)
- Place of birth: Gallarate, Italy
- Height: 1.82 m (6 ft 0 in)
- Position: Goalkeeper

Youth career
- Gallaratese

Senior career*
Years	Team	Apps	(Gls)
1974–1977	Como	6	(0)
1975–1976	Bolzano	30	(0)
1977–1980	Avellino	98	(0)
1980–1984	Milan	112	(0)
1984–1990	Atalanta	120	(0)
1990–1991	Genoa	3	(0)
Total		366	(0)
- * Club domestic league appearances and goals

Ottorino Piotti (born 31 July 1954) is an Italian former professional footballer, who played as a goalkeeper. He made 200 appearances in Serie A, most notably for Avellino, Milan and Atalanta, during the late 1970s and 1980s.

== Honours ==
=== Club ===
- A.C. Milan
  - Serie B: 1980–81, 1982–83
  - Mitropa Cup: 1982
