= Maurizio Mattei =

Italian association football referee (1942–2021)

Maurizio Mattei (27 February 1942 in Treia – 12 February 2021) was an Italian football referee and refereeing officer.

Mattei died on 12 February 2021, at the age of 78, at the Covid center in Civitanova Marche where he had been hospitalized after testing positive for COVID-19 during the COVID-19 pandemic in Italy, fifteen days short from his 79th birthday.
