= 1981–82 AC Milan season =

Milan Associazione Calcio
1981–82 season
- Owner: Felice Colombo (until 18 January 1982); Giuseppe Farina
- President: Gaetano Morazzoni (until 18 January 1982); Giuseppe Farina
- Manager: Luigi Radice (until 24 January 1982); Italo Galbiati
- Stadium: San Siro
- Serie A: 14th
- Coppa Italia: First round
- Mitropa Cup: Winner
- Top goalscorer: League: Antonelli (4); All: Antonelli; Jordan (6)
- Average home league attendance: 45,781
| Home colours | Away colours |

During the 1981–1982 season, Milan Associazione Calcio competed in Serie A, Coppa Italia and Mitropa Cup.

== Summary ==
At the start of the 1981–82 season, Luigi Radice, a former AC Milan player in the 1950s and 1960s, was hired as coach; among the new signings were those of playmaker Adelio Moro, coming from Ascoli, and Scottish centre-forward Joe Jordan from Manchester United. Milan struggles begun immediately, with misunderstandings between a coach with somewhat rough methods and players with little character. Franco Baresi's long absence due to a rare blood disease precipitated the situation. The team never left the relegation zone, the players seemed apathetic, and not even the open protests of the fans helped shaking them. Everything was tried, from the change of president (from Gaetano Morazzoni to Giuseppe Farina in January 1982) and coach (from Radice to Galbiati) to the unusual one of the captain (from Aldo Maldera to Fulvio Collovati), with few results. In the last five league games, however, with 8 points out of 10 available, Milan attempted a desperate comeback. At the final whistle of the last match, won 3–2 by Milan against Cesena), the team was virtually safe, but the last minutes of the Napoli-Genoa match were still being played in Naples; as a consequence of a sensational mistake by the Neapolitan goalkeeper Castellini, Genoa equalized, condemning Milan to their second relegation. Four days before, on 12 May 1982 at San Siro, beating the Czechoslovak side Vitkovice 3–0, Milan won the Mitropa Cup.

== Squad ==
Note: Flags indicate national team as defined under FIFA eligibility rules; some limited exceptions apply. Players may hold more than one non-FIFA nationality.

| Pos. | Nation | Player |
|---|---|---|
| GK | ITA | Roberto Incontri |
| GK | ITA | Ottorino Piotti |
| GK | ITA | Antonio Gambino |
| DF | ITA | Franco Baresi |
| DF | ITA | Maurizio Venturi |
| DF | ITA | Fulvio Collovati |
| DF | ITA | Andrea Icardi |
| MF | ITA | Aldo Maldera |
| DF | ITA | Alberto Minoia |
| DF | ITA | Mauro Tassotti |
| MF | ITA | Sergio Battistini |
| MF | ITA | Dario Donà |
| MF | ITA | Ruben Buriani |

| Pos. | Nation | Player |
|---|---|---|
| MF | ITA | Massimo Gadda |
| MF | ITA | Stefano Cuoghi |
| MF | ITA | Walter De Vecchi |
| MF | ITA | Alberigo Evani |
| MF | ITA | Adelio Moro |
| MF | ITA | Walter Novellino |
| MF | ITA | Francesco Romano |
| FW | ITA | Roberto Antonelli |
| FW | ITA | Alberto Cambiaghi |
| FW | ITA | Giuseppe Incocciati |
| FW | SCO | Joe Jordan |
| FW | ITA | Roberto Mandressi |
| FW | ITA | Fabio Valente |

=== Transfers ===
In
| Pos. | Name | from | Type |
|---|---|---|---|
| DF | Maurizio Venturi | Brescia | |
| MF | Dario Donà | Varese | |
| MF | Adelio Moro | Ascoli | |
| FW | Joe Jordan | Manchester United | |
| FW | Roberto Mandressi | Como | loan ended |

Out
| Pos. | Name | To | Type |
|---|---|---|---|
| GK | Antonio Vettore | Reggina | |
| DF | Aldo Bet | Campania | |
| DF | Maurizio Longobardo | Reggina | loan |
| MF | Marco Bolis | Monza | |
| MF | Gabriello Carotti | Ascoli | |
| MF | Walter De Vecchi | Ascoli | |
| MF | Emilio Monzani | Livorno | |
| MF | Dario Donà | L.R. Vicenza | |
| FW | Giuseppe Galluzzo | Monza | |
| FW | Francesco Vincenzi | Brescia | |

== Competitions ==
=== Serie A ===
==== League table ====
| Pos | Team | Pld | W | D | L | GF | GA | GD | Pts | Qualification or relegation |
|---|---|---|---|---|---|---|---|---|---|---|
| 12 | Cagliari | 30 | 7 | 11 | 12 | 33 | 36 | −3 | 25 | |
| 13 | Genoa | 30 | 6 | 13 | 11 | 24 | 29 | −5 | 25 | |
| 14 | Milan (R) | 30 | 7 | 10 | 13 | 21 | 31 | −10 | 24 | Relegation to Serie B |
| 15 | Bologna (R) | 30 | 6 | 11 | 13 | 25 | 37 | −12 | 23 | Relegation to Serie B |
| 16 | Como (R) | 30 | 3 | 11 | 16 | 18 | 42 | −24 | 17 | Relegation to Serie B |

Source: RSSSF.com
Rules for classification: 1) points; 2) Head-to-head points; 3) goal difference; 4) number of goals scored.
(R) Relegated

==== Results by round ====
| Round | 1 | 2 | 3 | 4 | 5 | 6 | 7 | 8 | 9 | 10 | 11 | 12 | 13 | 14 | 15 | 16 | 17 | 18 | 19 | 20 | 21 | 22 | 23 | 24 | 25 | 26 | 27 | 28 | 29 | 30 |
|---|---|---|---|---|---|---|---|---|---|---|---|---|---|---|---|---|---|---|---|---|---|---|---|---|---|---|---|---|---|---|
| Ground | A | H | A | H | A | H | A | H | A | A | H | A | H | A | H | H | A | H | A | H | A | H | A | H | H | A | H | A | H | A |
| Result | D | D | W | L | D | L | L | D | L | D | D | L | W | L | W | L | L | D | L | W | L | L | L | D | L | W | W | D | D | W |
| Position | 9 | 8 | 6 | 7 | 6 | 10 | 12 | 14 | 16 | 14 | 13 | 14 | 12 | 14 | 13 | 14 | 15 | 15 | 15 | 15 | 15 | 15 | 15 | 15 | 15 | 15 | 14 | 14 | 15 | 14 |

Source: Competitive matches
A = Away; H = Home; W = Win; D = Draw; L = Loss; = Leader, 1982–83 European Cup; = 1982–83 UEFA Cup; = 1982-83 Serie B

==== Matches ====
| 13 September 1981 1 | Udinese | 0–0 | Milan | Milan |
| | | Report | | Stadium: Stadio Friuli; Attendance: 41,518; Referee: Paolo Bergamo |

| 20 September 1981 2 | Milan | 0–0 | Fiorentina | Milan |
| | | Report | | Stadium: San Siro; Attendance: 54,300; Referee: Carlo Longhi |

| 27 September 1981 3 | Napoli | 0–1 | Milan | Naples |
| | | Report | 58' (o.g.) Ferrario | Stadium: Stadio San Paolo; Attendance: 71,669; Referee: Claudio Pieri |

| 4 October 1981 4 | Milan | 0–1 | Juventus | Milan |
| | | Report | 66' Virdis | Stadium: San Siro; Attendance: 68,433; Referee: Pietro D'Elia |

| 11 October 1981 5 | Bologna | 0–0 | Milan | Bologna |
| | | Report | | Stadium: Stadio Renato Dall'Ara; Attendance: 38,879; Referee: Vittorio Benedetti |

| 25 October 1981 6 | Milan | 0–1 | Inter Milan | Milan |
| | | Report | 69' Oriali | Stadium: San Siro; Attendance: 67,436; Referee: Enzo Barbaresco |

| 1 November 1981 7 | Catanzaro | 3–0 | Milan | Catanzaro |
| | Bivi 3'; Borghi 10'; Massimo Mauro 75' | Report | | Stadium: Stadio Nicola Ceravolo; Attendance: 22,894; Referee: Paolo Bergamo |

| 8 November 1981 8 | Milan | 1–1 | Como | Milan |
| | Jordan 20' | Report | 41' (pen.) Lombardi | Stadium: San Siro; Attendance: 36,929; Referee: Ballerini |

| 22 November 1981 9 | Ascoli | 1–0 | Milan | Ascoli Piceno |
| | Greco 79' (pen.) | Report | | Stadium: Stadio Cino e Lillo Del Duca; Attendance: 18,637; Referee: Redini |

| 29 November 1981 10 | Roma | 1–1 | Milan | Rome |
| | Spinosi 37' | Report | 35' Buriani | Stadium: Stadio Olimpico; Attendance: 48,861; Referee: D'Elia |

| 13 December 1981 11 | Milan | 0–0 | Genoa | Milan |
| | | Report | | Stadium: San Siro; Attendance: 34,954; Referee: Ciulli |

| 20 December 1981 12 | Avellino | 2–0 | Milan | Avellino |
| | Juary 24'; Piga 42' | Report | | Stadium: Stadio Partenio; Attendance: 23,473; Referee: Longhi |

| 3 January 1982 13 | Milan | 1–0 | Cagliari | Milan |
| | Battistini 73' | Report | | Stadium: San Siro; Attendance: 38,626; Referee: Lo Bello |

| 10 January 1982 14 | Torino | 2–1 | Milan | Turin |
| | Ferri 65'; Dossena 90' | Report | 70' Battistini | Stadium: Stadio Comunale Vittorio Pozzo; Attendance: 26,991; Referee: Bergamo |

| 17 January 1982 15 | Milan | 1–0 | Cesena | Milan |
| | Antonelli 4' | Report | | Stadium: San Siro; Attendance: 26,962; Referee: Menicucci |

| 24 January 1982 16 | Milan | 0–1 | Udinese | Milan |
| | | Report | 86' Causio | Stadium: San Siro; Attendance: 30,810; Referee: Longhi |

| 31 January 1982 17 | Fiorentina | 1–0 | Milan | Florence |
| | Miani 25' | Report | | Stadium: Stadio Comunale; Attendance: 50,459; Referee: D'Elia |

| 7 February 1982 18 | Milan | 1–1 | Napoli | Milan |
| | Antonelli 2' | Report | 29' (pen.) Guidetti | Stadium: San Siro; Attendance: 49,970; Referee: Barbaresco |

| 14 February 1982 19 | Juventus | 3–2 | Milan | Turin |
| | Galderisi 17', 63', 83' | Report | 44' Collovati; 71' Antonelli | Stadium: Stadio Comunale Vittorio Pozzo; Attendance: 44,498; Referee: Ciulli |

| 28 February 1982 20 | Milan | 2–1 | Bologna | Milan |
| | Moro 32'; Buriani 65' (pen.) | Report | 63' Chiorri | Stadium: San Siro; Attendance: 53,095; Referee: Lo Bello |

| 7 March 1982 21 | Inter Milan | 2–1 | Milan | Milan |
| | Prohaska 10'; Altobelli 32' | Report | 17' (o.g.) Prohaska | Stadium: San Siro; Attendance: 66,296; Referee: Agnolin |

| 14 March 1982 22 | Milan | 0–1 | Catanzaro | Milan |
| | | Report | 19' Bivi | Stadium: San Siro; Attendance: 51,619; Referee: Redini |

| 21 March 1982 23 | Como | 2–0 | Milan | Como |
| | Mossini 44'; Mancini 51' | Report | | Stadium: Stadio Giuseppe Sinigaglia; Attendance: 19,874; Referee: Paparesta |

| 28 March 1982 24 | Milan | 0–0 | Ascoli | Verona |
| | | Report | | Stadium: Stadio Marcantonio Bentegodi; Attendance: 31,554; Referee: Lops |

| 4 April 1982 25 | Milan | 1–2 | Roma | Verona |
| | Baresi 58' | Report | 47' Falcão; 52' (pen.) Pruzzo | Stadium: Stadio Marcantonio Bentegodi; Attendance: 38,685; Referee: Lo Bello |

| 18 April 1982 26 | Genoa | 1–2 | Milan | Genoa |
| | Briaschi 31' | Report | 75' Maldera; 80' (pen.) Baresi | Stadium: Stadio Luigi Ferraris; Attendance: 43,049; Referee: Menicucci |

| 25 April 1982 27 | Milan | 2–1 | Avellino | Milan |
| | Novellino 25'; Maldera 28' | Report | 2' Juary | Stadium: San Siro; Attendance: 46,903; Referee: Agnolin |

| 2 May 1982 28 | Cagliari | 1–1 | Milan | Cagliari |
| | Quagliozzi 17' | Report | 8' Battistini | Stadium: Stadio Sant'Elia; Attendance: 45,438; Referee: Menegali |

| 9 May 1982 29 | Milan | 0–0 | Torino | Milan |
| | | Report | | Stadium: San Siro; Attendance: 57,640; Referee: Redini |

| 16 May 1982 30 | Cesena | 2–3 | Milan | Cesena |
| | Garlini 42'; Piraccini 63' | Report | 67' Jordan; 72' Romano; 81' Antonelli | Stadium: Stadio Dino Manuzzi; Attendance: 29,547; Referee: Bergamo |

=== Coppa Italia ===
==== First round ====
Group 2
| Pos | Team | Pld | W | D | L | GF | GA | GD | Pts |
|---|---|---|---|---|---|---|---|---|---|
| 1 | Internazionale | 4 | 2 | 2 | 0 | 9 | 3 | +6 | 6 |
| 2 | Hellas Verona | 4 | 3 | 0 | 1 | 7 | 3 | +4 | 6 |
| 3 | Milan | 4 | 2 | 1 | 1 | 8 | 4 | +4 | 5 |
| 4 | SPAL | 4 | 0 | 2 | 2 | 2 | 5 | −3 | 2 |
| 5 | Pescara | 4 | 0 | 1 | 3 | 0 | 11 | −11 | 1 |

===== Matches =====
| 23 August 1981 1 | Hellas Verona | 2–0 | Milan | Mantua |
| | Penzo 17' (43) | | | Stadium: Stadio Danilo Martelli; Attendance: 20,569; Referee: Redini |

| 30 August 1981 2 | Milan | 5–0 | Pescara | Milan |
| | Novellino 1'; Mandressi 15'; Collovati 36'; Jordan 55', 75' | | | Stadium: San Siro; Attendance: 19,014; Referee: Lops |

| 2 September 1981 3 | Milan | 1–0 | SPAL | Milan |
| | Battistini 78' | | | Stadium: San Siro; Attendance: 23,051; Referee: Luigi Altobelli |

| 6 September 1981 4 | Inter Milan | 2–2 | Milan | Milan |
| | Altobelli 23'; Bergomi 89' | | 21' Novellino; 49' Jordan | Stadium: San Siro; Attendance: 65,656; Referee: Agnolin |

=== Mitropa Cup ===
==== Matches ====
| 20 October 1981 1 | Vítkovice | 2–1 | Milan | Ostrava |
| | Kušnír 27'; Gajdusek 90' (pen.) | Report | 15' Antonelli | Stadium: Městský stadion Attendance: 6,000; Referee: Mohácsi |

| 4 November 1981 2 | Milan | 2–0 | Haladás | Milano |
| | Collovati 15'; Incocciati 78' | Report | | Stadium: San Siro; Attendance: 4,200; Referee: Petrović |

| 25 November 1981 3 | Osijek | 1–1 | Milan | Osijek |
| | Sormaz 89' | Report | 60' Novellino | Stadium: Stadion Gradski vrt Attendance: 2,000; Referee: Latzin |

| 7 April 1982 4 | Haladás | 0–1 | Milan | Szombathely |
| | | Report | 20' Battistini | Stadium: Rohonci úti Stadion; Attendance: 2,000; Referee: Korhat |

| 21 April 1982 5 | Milan | 2–1 | Osijek | Milano |
| | Antonelli 6'; Baresi 10' (pen.) | Report | 46' Rakla | Stadium: San Siro; Attendance: 10,000; Referee: Poncek |

| 12 May 1982 6 | Milan | 3–0 | Vítkovice | Milano |
| | Baresi 12' (pen.); Cambiaghi 50'; Jordan 77' (pen.) | Report | | Stadium: San Siro; Attendance: 10,000; Referee: Vlajić |

== Statistics ==
=== Squad statistics ===
| Competition | Points | Home | | | | | | Away | | | | | | Total | | | | | | GD |
| Competition | Points | G | W | D | L | Gs | Ga | G | W | D | L | Gs | Ga | G | W | D | L | Gs | Ga | GD |
|---|---|---|---|---|---|---|---|---|---|---|---|---|---|---|---|---|---|---|---|---|
| 1981-82 Serie A | 24 | 15 | 4 | 6 | 5 | 9 | 10 | 15 | 3 | 4 | 8 | 12 | 21 | 30 | 7 | 10 | 13 | 21 | 31 | −10 |
| 1981-82 Coppa Italia | – | 2 | 2 | 0 | 0 | 6 | 0 | 2 | 0 | 1 | 1 | 2 | 4 | 4 | 2 | 1 | 1 | 8 | 4 | +4 |
| Mitropa Cup | 9 | 3 | 3 | 0 | 0 | 7 | 1 | 3 | 1 | 1 | 1 | 3 | 3 | 6 | 4 | 1 | 1 | 10 | 4 | +6 |
| Total | – | 20 | 9 | 6 | 5 | 22 | 11 | 20 | 4 | 6 | 10 | 17 | 28 | 40 | 13 | 12 | 15 | 39 | 39 | 0 |

=== Players statistics ===
| No. | Pos | Nat | Player | Total | | 1981-82 Serie A | | 1981-82 Coppa Italia | | Mitropa Cup | |
| No. | Pos | Nat | Player | Apps | Goals | Apps | Goals | Apps | Goals | Apps | Goals |
|---|---|---|---|---|---|---|---|---|---|---|---|
| | FW | (Italy) ITA | Antonelli | 30 | 6 | 24 | 4 | 1 | 0 | 5 | 2 |
| | DF | (Italy) ITA | Baresi | 25 | 4 | 18 | 2 | 4 | 0 | 3 | 2 |
| | MF | (Italy) ITA | Battistini | 39 | 5 | 30 | 3 | 4 | 1 | 5 | 1 |
| | FW | (Italy) ITA | Buriani | 26 | 5 | 23 | 2 | 3 | 0 | 0 | 3 |
| | MF | (Italy) ITA | Cambiaghi | 2 | 1 | 0 | 0 | 1 | 0 | 1 | 1 |
| | DF | (Italy) ITA | Collovati | 38 | 3 | 29 | 1 | 4 | 1 | 5 | 1 |
| | FW | (Italy) ITA | Cuoghi | 7 | 0 | 5 | 0 | 0 | 0 | 2 | 0 |
| | MF | (Italy) ITA | Donà | 2 | 0 | 0 | 0 | 2 | 0 | 0 | 0 |
| | MF | (Italy) ITA | Evani | 14 | 0 | 10 | 0 | 0 | 0 | 4 | 0 |
| | MF | (Italy) ITA | Romano | 35 | 1 | 26 | 1 | 4 | 0 | 5 | 0 |
| | MF | (Italy) ITA | Gadda | 4 | 0 | 3 | 0 | 0 | 0 | 1 | 0 |
| | GK | (Italy) ITA | Gambino | 0 | 0 | 0 | -0 | 0 | -0 | 0 | -0 |
| | DF | (Italy) ITA | Icardi | 29 | 0 | 20 | 0 | 3 | 0 | 6 | 0 |
| | FW | (Italy) ITA | Incocciati | 17 | 1 | 13 | 0 | 0 | 0 | 4 | 1 |
| | GK | (Italy) ITA | Incontri | 0 | 0 | 0 | -0 | 0 | -0 | 0 | -0 |
| | FW | (Scotland) SCO | Jordan | 30 | 6 | 22 | 2 | 4 | 3 | 4 | 1 |
| | DF | (Italy) ITA | Maldera | 35 | 2 | 27 | 2 | 4 | 0 | 4 | 0 |
| | FW | (Italy) ITA | Mandressi | 9 | 1 | 6 | 0 | 2 | 1 | 1 | 0 |
| | DF | (Italy) ITA | Minoia | 7 | 0 | 5 | 0 | 1 | 0 | 1 | 0 |
| | MF | (Italy) ITA | Moro | 24 | 1 | 19 | 1 | 2 | 0 | 3 | 0 |
| | MF | (Italy) ITA | Novellino | 36 | 4 | 28 | 1 | 4 | 2 | 4 | 1 |
| | GK | (Italy) ITA | Piotti | 40 | -39 | 30 | -31 | 4 | -4 | 6 | -4 |
| | DF | (Italy) ITA | Tassotti | 33 | 0 | 24 | 0 | 4 | 0 | 5 | 0 |
| | FW | (Italy) ITA | Valente | 1 | 0 | 1 | 0 | 0 | 0 | 0 | 0 |
| | DF | (Italy) ITA | Venturi | 18 | 0 | 13 | 0 | 0 | 0 | 5 | 0 |

== See also ==
- "Almanacco illustrato del Milan" (2 ed.). Panini. Panini. 2005.
