= 1979–80 AC Milan season =

Milan Associazione Calcio
1979–80 season
- Owner: Felice Colombo
- President: Felice Colombo
- Manager: Massimo Giacomini
- Stadium: San Siro
- Serie A: 15th (in Serie B)
- Coppa Italia: Quarterfinals
- European Cup: Round of 32
- Top goalscorer: League: Chiodi (7); All: Chiodi (11)
- Highest home attendance: 78,740 vs Inter (2 March 1980)
- Lowest home attendance: 22,241 vs Pescara (4 May 1980)
- Average home league attendance: 40,660
Home colours	Away colours	Third colours

During the 1979–1980 season, Milan Associazione Calcio competed in Serie A, Coppa Italia and European Cup.

== Summary ==
In his third campaign as chairman, Felice Colombo appointed club legend Gianni Rivera as vice-president and Massimo Giacomini as new head coach. The latter arrived from Udinese and was a former Milan player from 1966 to 1968. The main signings of the summer were midfielder Francesco Romano and forward Giuseppe Galluzzo, from A.C. Reggiana and Lecce respectively.

In the league, Milan initially tried to chase down rivals Inter, only to then lose pace at the start of the second half of the season, and abdicated in their defense of the Scudetto won the previous year, finishing the tournament in third place, five points behind title-winner Inter.

In Coppa Italia, Milan obtained seven points in the first group stage where they faced A.C. Monza, Pisa and Genoa and Pescara. In the quarter-finals, the squad was defeated by Roma with a 4–0 at San Siro and a 2–2 draw at Olimpico.

In the European Cup, the squad was eliminated in the round of 32 by Porto, which, after a draw at Porto, won at San Siro 1–0 thanks to a goal scored by Duda ending a 20 years undefeated streak at home in European competitions for Milan.

However, towards the end of the season, Milan was included in inquiries by authorities regarding the Totonero match fixing scandal. The alleged fixed match in question was a Milan-Lazio disputed on 6 January 1980. Federal prosecutors appointed several club players (Enrico Albertosi, Giorgio Morini and Stefano Chiodi) and president Felice Colombo too. At the end of the judicial process the sport judges sanctioned Colombo with a life ban from any role in football (later that sentence would be reduced by appeal); sanctions included suspensions for Albertosi, Morini and Chiodi (four years, one year and six months respectively) while the team was relegated to the 1980-81 Serie B (along with Lazio). Owing to the Totonero sanctions, the club cancelled the transfers in of Bruno Giordano and Paulo Roberto Falcão.

== Squad ==
Note: Flags indicate national team as defined under FIFA eligibility rules; some limited exceptions apply. Players may hold more than one non-FIFA nationality.

Pos.	Nation	Player
GK	ITA	Enrico Albertosi
GK	ITA	Francesco Navazzotti
GK	ITA	Antonio Rigamonti
DF	ITA	Franco Baresi
DF	ITA	Aldo Bet
DF	ITA	Fulvio Collovati
DF	ITA	Aldo Maldera
DF	ITA	Alberto Minoia
MF	ITA	Sergio Battistini
MF	ITA	Alberto Bigon
MF	ITA	Ruben Buriani

Pos.	Nation	Player
MF	ITA	Fabio Capello
MF	ITA	Gabriello Carotti
MF	ITA	Walter De Vecchi
MF	ITA	Giorgio Morini
MF	ITA	Walter Novellino
MF	ITA	Francesco Romano
FW	ITA	Roberto Antonelli
FW	ITA	Stefano Chiodi
FW	ITA	Giuseppe Galluzzo
FW	ITA	Roberto Mandressi

=== Transfers ===
In
Pos.	Name	from	Type
MF	Francesco Romano	A.C. Reggiana	
FW	Giuseppe Galluzzo	Lecce	

Out
Pos.	Name	To	Type
MF	Gianni Rivera	–	retired
DF	Simone Boldini	Ascoli Calcio	
FW	Giovanni Sartori	Sampdoria	

== Competitions ==
=== Serie A ===
==== League table ====
Pos	Team	Pld	W	D	L	GF	GA	GD	Pts	Qualification or relegation
12	Catanzaro	30	5	14	11	20	34	−14	24	
13	Udinese	30	3	15	12	24	38	−14	21	
14	Pescara (R)	30	4	8	18	18	44	−26	16	Relegation to Serie B
15	Milan (Note: A.C. Milan and S.S. Lazio placed in the last position and relegated to Serie B by FIGC because of the Totonero 1980 scandal. Torino qualified to UEFA Cup instead of Milan.) (D, R)	30	14	8	8	34	19	+15	36	Relegation to Serie B
16	Lazio (D, R)	30	5	15	10	21	25	−4	25	Relegation to Serie B

Source: RSSSF.com
Rules for classification: 1) Points; 2) Head-to-head points; 3) Head-to-head goal difference; 4) Goal difference; 5) Goals scored; 6) Draw. (Note: Head-to-head record is used only after all the matches between the teams in question have been played).
Goal difference is used in case of equal points.
(D) Disqualified; (R) Relegated

==== Result by round ====
Round	1	2	3	4	5	6	7	8	9	10	11	12	13	14	15	16	17	18	19	20	21	22	23	24	25	26	27	28	29	30	31
Ground	A	H	A	H	A	H	A	H	A	P	H	H	A	H	A	H	H	A	H	A	H	A	H	A	H	A	A	H	A	H	A
Result	D	W	D	W	D	W	L	W	W	P	L	D	W	L	D	W	D	L	W	L	W	D	L	D	L	W	L	W	W	W	W
Position	2	1	4	2	2	2	3	2	2	2	2	2	2	2	2	2	2	2	2	2	2	2	2	2	4	2	5	5	4	3	15

Source: Competitive matches
A = Away; H = Home; W = Win; D = Draw; L = Loss; P = Postponed; = Leader, 1980–81 European Cup; = 1980–81 UEFA Cup; = 1980-81 Serie B; R = Relegated to the 1980-81 Serie B by the Federal Commission of Appeals C.A.F due to the Totonero match fixing scandal.

==== Matches ====
16 September 1979 1	A.S. Roma	0–0	Milan	Rome
		Report		Stadium: Olimpico; Attendance: 74,759; Referee: Michelotti

23 September 1979 2	Milan	1–0	Avellino	Milan
	Chiodi 21'	Report		Stadium: San Siro; Attendance: 50,893; Referee: Menegali

30 September 1979 3	Cagliari	0–0	Milan	Cagliari
		Report		Stadium: Sant'Elia; Attendance: 46,302; Referee: Gino Menicucci

7 October 1979 4	Milan	2–1	Juventus	Milan
	Novellino 7'; Antonelli 44'	Report	46' Tardelli	Stadium: San Siro; Attendance: 67,274; Referee: Luigi Agnolin

14 October 1979 5	Perugia	1–1	Milan	Perugia
	Rossi 1'	Report	36' Carotti	Stadium: Renato Curi; Attendance: 26,445; Referee: Massimo Ciulli

21 October 1979 6	Milan	3–0	Ascoli	Milan
	Romano 9'; Chiodi 20' (pen.), 47'	Report		Stadium: San Siro; Attendance: 37,253; Referee: Rosario Lo Bello

28 October 1979 7	Inter	2–0	Milan	Milan
	Beccalossi 14', 84'	Report		Stadium: Giuseppe Meazza; Attendance: 79,302; Referee: Gino Menicucci

4 November 1979 8	Milan	2–0	Fiorentina	Milan
	Maldera 37'; Di Gennaro 42' (o.g.)	Report		Stadium: San Siro; Attendance: 39,207; Referee: Riccardo Lattanzi

11 November 1979 9	Torino	0–1	Milan	Turin
		Report	88' Novellino	Stadium: Comunale; Attendance: 37,563; Referee: Gianfranco Menegali

12 December 1979 10	Milan	1–2	S.S.C. Napoli	Milan
	Ferrario 64' (o.g.)	Report	63' Filippi; 75' Marino	Stadium: San Siro; Attendance: 35,534; Referee: Carlo Longhi
Note: Match suspended on 25 November 1979 at 48' due to fog with a 0–0 score.

2 December 1979 11	Milan	0–0	Udinese	Milan
		Report		Stadium: San Siro; Attendance: 28,460; Referee: Maurizio Mattei

9 December 1979 12	Bologna F.C.	0–1	Milan	Bologna
		Report	50' De Vecchi	Stadium: Comunale; Attendance: 36,246; Referee: Rosario Lo Bello

16 December 1979 13	Milan	0–0	Catanzaro	Milan
		Report		Stadium: San Siro; Attendance: 36,473; Referee: Agnolin

30 December 1979 14	Pescara	2–1	Milan	Pescara
	Cinquetti 3'; Negrisolo 78'	Report	22' (o.g.) Prestanti	Stadium: Adriatico; Attendance: 35,731; Referee: Gianfranco Menegali

6 January 1980 15	Milan	2–1	S.S. Lazio	Milan
	Chiodi 4', 39'	Report	90' Giordano	Stadium: San Siro; Attendance: 28,158; Referee: Michelotti

13 January 1980 16	Milan	0–0	A.S. Roma	Milan
		Report		Stadium: San Siro; Attendance: 36,132; Referee: Paolo Bergamo

20 January 1980 17	Avellino	1–0	Milan	Avellino
	Cattaneo 50'	Report		Stadium: Partenio; Attendance: 28,228; Referee: Rosario Lo Bello

27 January 1980 18	Milan	2–0	Cagliari	Milan
	De Vecchi 27'; Buriani 79'	Report		Stadium: San Siro; Attendance: 43,489; Referee: Agnolin

3 February 1980 19	Juventus	2–1	Milan	Turin
	Maldera 66' (o.g.); Bettega 78'	Report	10' De Vecchi	Stadium: Comunale; Attendance: 53,194; Referee: Pietro D'Elia

10 February 1980 20	Milan	1–0	Perugia	Milan
	Antonelli 74'	Report		Stadium: San Siro; Attendance: 44,412; Referee: Vittorio Benedetti

24 February 1980 21	Ascoli	0–0	Milan	Ascoli Piceno
		Report		Stadium: Cino e Lillo Del Duca; Attendance: 28,114; Referee: Riccardo Lattanzi

2 March 1980 22	Milan	0–1	Inter	Milan
		Report	77' Oriali	Stadium: San Siro; Attendance: 78,740; Referee: Luigi Agnolin

9 March 1980 23	Fiorentina	1–1	Milan	Florence
	Chiodi 44' (o.g.)	Report	79' (o.g.) Desolati	Stadium: Comunale; Attendance: 43,728; Referee: Ferdinando Reggiani

23 March 1980 24	Milan	0–2	Torino	Milan
		Report	31' Zaccarelli; 79' Pulici	Stadium: San Siro; Attendance: 30,108; Referee: Claudio Pieri

30 March 1980 25	S.S.C. Napoli	0–1	Milan	Naples
		Report	52' Bigon	Stadium: San Paolo; Attendance: 49,908; Referee: Alberto Michelotti

5 April 1980 26	Udinese	2–1	Milan	Udine
	Vriz 72'; Pin 84'	Report	15' Bigon	Stadium: Friuli; Attendance: 27,919; Referee: Paparesta

13 April 1980 27	Milan	4–0	Bologna F.C.	Milan
	Colomba 20' (o.g.); Maldera 25'; Chiodi 55' (pen.), 63'	Report		Stadium: San Siro; Attendance: 32,195; Referee: Riccardo Lattanzi

27 April 1980 28	Catanzaro	0–3	Milan	Catanzaro
		Report	12' Galluzzo; 29' Antonelli; 48' (o.g.) Groppi	Stadium: Comunale; Attendance: 11,375; Referee: Mattei

4 May 1980 29	Milan	3–1	Pescara	Milan
	Maldera 9', 56'; De Vecchi 69'	Report	57' Nobili	Stadium: San Siro; Attendance: 22,241; Referee: Fernando Tani

11 May 1980 30	S.S. Lazio	0–2	Milan	Rome
		Report	9' Galluzzo; 80' Carotti	Stadium: Olimpico; Attendance: 25,949; Referee: Piero Patrussi

=== Coppa Italia ===
==== First round ====
Pos	Team	Pld	W	D	L	GF	GA	GD	Pts
1	Milan	4	3	1	0	7	3	+4	7
2	Genoa	4	2	1	1	6	3	+3	5
3	Monza	4	1	2	1	5	4	+1	4
4	Pescara	4	1	2	1	5	6	−1	4
5	Pisa	4	0	0	4	3	10	−7	0

22 August 1979 1	Milan	2–0	A.C. Monza	Piacenza
	Chiodi 67' (pen.), 84' (pen.)			Stadium: Galleana; Attendance: 20,000; Referee: Domenico Lops

26 August 1979 2	Pisa	1–2	Milan	Pisa
	Barbana 73'		30' Chiodi; 84' Maldera	Stadium: Arena Garibaldi; Attendance: 25,000; Referee: Massimo Ciulli

5 September 1979 3	Pescara	1–1	Milan	Pescara
	Repetto 56'		76' Collovati	Stadium: Adriatico; Attendance: 40,000; Referee: Gianfranco Menegali

9 September 1979 4	Milan	2–1	Genoa C.F.C	Novara
	Chiodi 38' (pen.); Antonelli 44'		40' (pen.) Manfrin	Stadium: Comunale; Attendance: 20,000; Referee: Pietro D'Elia

==== Quarterfinals ====
21 November 1979	Milan	0–4	A.S. Roma	Milan
			18' Benetti; 24' (o.g.) Bet; 30' Conti; 86' Ugolotti	Stadium: San Siro; Attendance: 12,380; Referee: Alberto Michelotti

5 December 1979	A.S. Roma	2–2	Milan	Rome
	Minoia 21' (o.g.); Pruzzo 58'		63' Capello; 74' Bigon	Stadium: Olimpico; Attendance: 29,318; Referee: Ferdinando Reggiani

=== European Cup ===
==== First round ====
19 September 1979	FC Porto (Portugal)	0–0	(Italy) Milan	Porto
		Report		Stadium: Estádio das Antas; Attendance: 75,000; Referee: (Austria) Linemayr

3 October 1979	Milan (Italy)	0–1	(Portugal) FC Porto	Milan
		Report	60' Duda	Stadium: San Siro; Attendance: 60,000; Referee: (Turkey) Ok

== Statistics ==
=== Squad statistics ===
Competition	Points	Home						Away						Total						GD
Competition	Points	G	W	D	L	Gs	Ga	G	W	D	L	Gs	Ga	G	W	D	L	Gs	Ga	GD
1979-80 Serie A	36	15	9	3	3	22	8	15	5	5	5	12	11	30	14	8	8	34	19	+15
1979-80 Coppa Italia	–	3	2	0	1	4	5	3	1	2	0	5	4	6	3	2	1	9	9	0
1979-80 European Cup	–	1	0	0	1	0	1	1	0	1	0	0	0	2	0	1	1	0	1	−1
Total	–	19	11	3	5	26	14	19	6	8	5	17	15	38	17	11	10	43	29	+14

=== Players statistics ===
No.	Pos	Nat	Player	Total		Serie A		Coppa Italia		European Cup	
No.	Pos	Nat	Player	Apps	Goals	Apps	Goals	Apps	Goals	Apps	Goals
	GK	(Italy) ITA	Albertosi	28	-22	20	-12	6	-9	2	-1
	DF	(Italy) ITA	Maldera	35	5	28	4	5	1	2	0
	DF	(Italy) ITA	Baresi	35	0	28	0	6	0	1	0
	DF	(Italy) ITA	Collovati	38	1	30	0	6	1	2	0
	MF	(Italy) ITA	Novellino	35	2	28	2	5	0	2	0
	MF	(Italy) ITA	Buriani	37	1	30	1	5	0	2	0
	MF	(Italy) ITA	Romano	27	1	23	1	3	0	1	0
	MF	(Italy) ITA	Bigon	26	3	18	2	6	1	2	0
	MF	(Italy) ITA	De Vecchi	35	4	29	4	4	0	2	0
	FW	(Italy) ITA	Chiodi	34	11	26	7	6	4	2	0
	FW	(Italy) ITA	Antonelli	32	4	26	3	4	1	2	0
	GK	(Italy) ITA	Rigamonti	10	-7	10	-7	0	-0	0	-0
	DF	(Italy) ITA	Bet	21	0	14	0	6	0	1	0
	DF	(Italy) ITA	Morini	16	0	11	0	4	0	1	0
	DF	(Italy) ITA	Minoia	12	0	11	0	1	0	0	0
	MF	(Italy) ITA	Carotti	20	2	15	2	3	0	2	0
	MF	(Italy) ITA	Galluzzo	9	2	4	2	3	0	2	0
	MF	(Italy) ITA	Capello	4	1	3	0	1	1	0	0
	FW	(Italy) ITA	Mandressi	4	0	3	0	1	0	0	0
	GK	(Italy) ITA	Navazzotti	1	0	1	-0	0	-0	0	-0
	DF	(Italy) ITA	Battistini	1	0	0	0	1	0	0	0

== See also ==
- Almanacco illustrato del Milan (2 ed.). Panini. March 2005.
- Almanacco illustrato del Calcio 2003. Panini. 2003.
- Calciatori Panini 1979–80 (riedizione La Gazzetta dello Sport ed.). La Gazzetta dello Sport. 2005.
- Tosi, Enrico (May 2005). Forza Milan! – La storia del Milan. Italia/Italy.
