= 1978–79 AC Milan season =

Milan Associazione Calcio
1978–79 season
- Owner: Felice Colombo
- President: Felice Colombo
- Manager: Nils Liedholm
- Stadium: San Siro
- Serie A: 1st 10th title (in European Cup)
- Coppa Italia: First round
- UEFA Cup: Round of 16
- Top goalscorer: League: Bigon (12); All: Bigon (17)
- Average home league attendance: 48,358
Home colours	Away colours

During the 1978–1979 season, Milan Associazione Calcio competed in Serie A, Coppa Italia and UEFA Cup.

== Summary ==
The summer of 1978 saw the signings of Walter De Vecchi, Walter Novellino and Stefano Chiodi, while Giuseppe Sabadini, Maurizio Turone and Egidio Calloni left Milan after a long spell at the club. The 1978-79 season started with the elimination in the first round of the Coppa Italia, where Milan closed group 4 in second place with five points, thanks to two victories against Lecce and Foggia in the first two days, the defeat against SPAL in the third and the draw in the fourth and final match with Catanzaro, who qualified for the quarter-finals with a 2-point lead over the Rossoneri.

In the league, Milan achieved four wins and a draw in the first five games, taking the lead in the standings with nine points. In the following match, the Rossoneri lost at home to the reigning Italian champions Juventus and left the top of the rankings to Perugia. The Umbrians were joined by the Rossoneri two rounds later and passed on matchday 11; Milan closed the first half of the season at the top of the table, with 25 points with Perugia three lengths behind. In the second half of the season, the dualism with the Umbrian team continued; Milan arrived on the matchday 25 against Perugia with a two-point lead which they maintained thanks to the 1-1 draw. On May 6, 1979, on the penultimate game of the championship, Milan could celebrate the conquest of their long-awaited tenth Scudetto, that of the first stella, thanks to a goalless draw with Bologna. Perugia (runner-up) ended the championship undefeated, first among the Italian teams to succeed in such an achievement (equaled by the Rossoneri who won the Serie A in 1991-1992 and by Juventus in 2011-2012).

In the UEFA Cup the Rossoneri eliminated the Czechoslovaks of Lokomotíva Košice on penalties in the round of 64 (1-0 home win in the first leg and defeat with the same result in the second leg in Košice) and the Bulgarians of Levski Spartak in the round of 32 (1-1 in Sofia and 3-0 in Milan). In the round of 16, Milan faced English side Manchester City who, after a 2-2 draw at San Siro, eliminated the Rossoneri and qualified for the next round thanks to a 3-0 victory at Maine Road.

At the end of the season, captain Gianni Rivera retired from football, after 19 seasons with the club in which he played 658 matches (a record at the time) scoring 164 goals. Nils Liedholm also left Milan to move to Roma, due to contractual disagreements with the management.

One of the most iconic scenes of the season, and of the entire career of Gianni Rivera, occurred on the day of the aforementioned title-winning game against Bologna. The San Siro was undergoing some maintenance work in a section of the second tier, but, before the start of the game, some fans invaded that area, putting themselves and those in the surroundings at risk. The probability was high that, if the situation was not resolved quickly, the sports judge would have forfeited the match with a defeat for Milan. Thus, Rivera took the microphone and improvised a speech to the crowd where he explained the situation and warned about the risk of a forfeited game. The tifosi, trusting their idol, slowly evacuated the area, allowing the match to start regularly, 26 minutes later than scheduled.

== Squad ==
Note: Flags indicate national team as defined under FIFA eligibility rules; some limited exceptions apply. Players may hold more than one non-FIFA nationality.

Pos.	Nation	Player
GK	ITA	Enrico Albertosi
GK	ITA	Antonio Rigamonti
DF	ITA	Franco Baresi
DF	ITA	Aldo Bet
DF	ITA	Simone Boldini
DF	ITA	Fulvio Collovati
DF	ITA	Aldo Maldera
DF	ITA	Alberto Minoia
MF	ITA	Alberto Bigon (vice captain)

Pos.	Nation	Player
MF	ITA	Ruben Buriani
MF	ITA	Fabio Capello
MF	ITA	Walter De Vecchi
MF	ITA	Giorgio Morini
MF	ITA	Walter Novellino
MF	ITA	Gianni Rivera (captain)
FW	ITA	Roberto Antonelli
FW	ITA	Stefano Chiodi
FW	ITA	Giovanni Sartori

=== Transfers ===
In
Pos.	Name	from	Type
MF	Walter De Vecchi	Monza	
MF	Walter Novellino	Perugia	
FW	Stefano Chiodi	Bologna	

Out
Pos.	Name	To	Type
DF	Giuseppe Sabadini	Catanzaro	
DF	Maurizio Turone	Catanzaro	
FW	Egidio Calloni	Hellas Verona	
FW	Luciano Gaudino	A.S. Bari	
FW	Ugo Tosetto	Avellino	
FW	Sergio Valentinuzzi	Savona	

== Competitions ==
=== Serie A ===
==== League table ====
Pos	Team	Pld	W	D	L	GF	GA	GD	Pts	Qualification or relegation
1	Milan (C)	30	17	10	3	46	19	+27	44	Qualification to European Cup
2	Perugia	30	11	19	0	34	16	+18	41	Qualification to UEFA Cup
3	Juventus	30	12	13	5	40	23	+17	37	Qualification to Cup Winners' Cup
4	Internazionale	30	10	16	4	38	24	+14	36	Qualification to UEFA Cup
5	Torino	30	11	14	5	35	23	+12	36	Qualification to UEFA Cup

Source: Panini
(C) Champions

==== Result by round ====
Round	1	2	3	4	5	6	7	8	9	10	11	12	13	14	15	16	17	18	19	20	21	22	23	24	25	26	27	28	29	30
Ground	H	A	H	A	H	A	H	A	H	A	A	H	H	A	H	A	H	A	H	A	H	A	H	A	H	H	A	A	H	A
Result	W	W	D	W	W	L	W	W	D	D	W	W	W	W	W	L	W	W	D	W	D	D	D	L	D	W	W	W	D	D
Position	1	1	1	1	1	2	2	1	1	1	1	1	1	1	1	1	1	1	1	1	1	1	1	1	1	1	1	1	1	1

Source: Competitive matches
A = Away; H = Home; W = Win; D = Draw; L = Loss; P = Postponed; = Leader, 1979–80 European Cup; = 1979–80 UEFA Cup

==== Matches ====
1 October 1978 1	Milan	1–0	Avellino	Milan
	Buriani 79'	Report		Stadium: Stadio San Siro; Attendance: 42,147; Referee: Mattei

8 October 1978 2	Roma	0–3	Milan	Rome
		Report	15' Maldera; 38' (pen.), 61' (pen.) Chiodi	Stadium: Stadio Olimpico; Attendance: 69,410; Referee: Agnolin

15 October 1978 3	Milan	0–0	Ascoli	Milan
		Report		Stadium: Stadio San Siro; Attendance: 45,149; Referee: D'Elia

22 October 1978 4	Atalanta	1–3	Milan	Milan
	Garritano 31' (pen.)	Report	3' Maldera; 35' (pen.), 60' (pen.) Chiodi	Stadium: Stadio San Siro; Attendance: 31,788; Referee: Reggiani

29 October 1978 5	Milan	4–1	Fiorentina	Milan
	Minoia 5'; Bigon 16', 39', 80'	Report	29' Amenta	Stadium: Stadio San Siro; Attendance: 46,136; Referee: Ciulli

5 November 1978 6	Juventus	1–0	Milan	Turin
	Bettega 2'	Report		Stadium: Stadio Comunale; Attendance: 66,377; Referee: D'Elia

12 November 1978 7	Milan	1–0	Inter Milan	Milan
	Maldera 49'	Report		Stadium: Stadio San Siro; Attendance: 65,965; Referee: Michelotti

19 November 1978 8	Lanerossi Vicenza	2–3	Milan	Vicenza
	Paolo Rossi 45'; Guidetti 89'	Report	8' Maldera; 65' Bigon; 80' Boldini	Stadium: Stadio Romeo Menti; Attendance: 30,572; Referee: Menicucci

26 November 1978 9	S.S.C. Napoli	1–1	Milan	Naples
	Savoldi 4'	Report	57' De Vecchi	Stadium: Stadio San Paolo; Attendance: 68,185; Referee: Ciulli

3 December 1978 10	Milan	1–1	Perugia	Milan
	Antonelli 62'	Report	3' Vannini	Stadium: Stadio San Siro; Attendance: 44,825; Referee: Longhi

10 December 1978 11	Milan	1–0	Torino	Milan
	De Vecchi 3'	Report		Stadium: Stadio San Siro; Attendance: 37,415; Referee: Menicucci

17 December 1978 12	Hellas Verona	1–3	Milan	Verona
	Spinozzi 62'	Report	54' Novellino; 63' Antonelli; 73' De Vecchi	Stadium: Stadio Marcantonio Bentegodi; Attendance: 30,917; Referee: Reggiani

7 January 1979 13	Milan	4–0	Catanzaro	Milan
	Chiodi 16'; Bigon 21'; Novellino 76'; Antonelli 81'	Report		Stadium: Stadio San Siro; Attendance: 35,309; Referee: Lo Bello

14 January 1979 14	Bologna	0–1	Milan	Bologna
		Report	61' Maldera	Stadium: Comunale; Attendance: 47,709; Referee: Menegali

21 January 1979 15	Milan	2–0	Lazio	Milan
	Maldera 16'; Bigon 65'	Report		Stadium: Stadio San Siro; Attendance: 39,090; Referee: Pieri

28 January 1979 16	Avellino	1–0	Milan	Avellino
	Vincenzo Romano 14'	Report		Stadium: Stadio Partenio; Attendance: 47,286; Referee: Michelotti

4 February 1979 17	Milan	1–0	Roma	Milan
	Antonelli 80' (pen.)	Report		Stadium: Stadio San Siro; Attendance: 46,396; Referee: Milan

11 February 1979 18	Ascoli	0–1	Milan	Ascoli Piceno
		Report	30' Maldera	Stadium: Stadio Cino e Lillo Del Duca; Attendance: 37,256; Referee: Ciulli

18 February 1979 19	Milan	1–1	Atalanta	Milan
	Bigon 24'	Report	42' Tavola	Stadium: Stadio San Siro; Attendance: 44,532; Referee: Lattanzi

4 March 1979 20	Fiorentina	2–3	Milan	Florence
	Lelj 44'; Baresi 65' (o.g.)	Report	5' Maldera; 35', 53' Bigon	Stadium: Stadio Comunale; Attendance: 55,140; Referee: Benedetti

11 March 1979 2	Milan	0–0	Juventus	Milan
		Report		Stadium: Stadio San Siro; Attendance: 65,235; Referee: Michelotti

18 March 1979 22	Inter Milan	2–2	Milan	Milan
	Oriali 50'; Altobelli 78'	Report	80', 89' De Vecchi	Stadium: Stadio San Siro; Attendance: 64,868; Referee: Agnolin

25 March 1979 23	Milan	0–0	Lanerossi Vicenza	Milan
		Report		Stadium: Stadio San Siro; Attendance: 43,806; Referee: Longhi

1 April 1979 24	Milan	0–1	Napoli	Milan
		Report	40' Majo	Stadium: Stadio San Siro; Attendance: 51,311; Referee: Menicucci

8 April 1979 25	Perugia	1–1	Milan	Perugia
	Casarsa 17' (pen.)	Report	15' (pen.) Chiodi	Stadium: Stadio Renato Curi; Attendance: 28,717; Referee: Agnolin

14 April 1979 26	Torino	0–3	Milan	Turin
		Report	41', 53' Bigon; 45' (pen.) Chiodi	Stadium: Stadio Olimpico Grande Torino; Attendance: 56,429; Referee: Lattanzi

22 April 1979 27	Milan	2–1	Hellas Verona	Milan
	Rivera 47'; Novellino 84'	Report	24' Calloni	Stadium: Stadio San Siro; Attendance: 51,247; Referee: Ciulli

29 April 1979 28	Catanzaro	1–3	Milan	Catanzaro
	Ranieri 52'	Report	48' Maldera; 58' Novellino; 89' Antonelli	Stadium: Stadio Comunale; Attendance: 25,491; Referee: Longhi

6 May 1979 29	Milan	0–0	Bologna	Milan
		Report		Stadium: Stadio San Siro; Attendance: 65,044; Referee: Menicucci

13 May 1979 30	Lazio	1–1	Milan	Rome
	Bruno Giordano 32'	Report	8' Bigon	Stadium: Stadio Olimpico; Attendance: 53,550; Referee: Terpin

=== Coppa Italia ===
==== Group stage ====
Pos	Team	Pld	W	D	L	GF	GA	GD	Pts
1	Catanzaro	4	3	1	0	11	4	+7	7
2	Milan	4	2	1	1	9	7	+2	5
3	SPAL	4	2	0	2	6	6	0	4
4	Lecce	4	1	0	3	4	7	−3	2
5	Foggia	4	1	0	3	2	8	−6	2

30 August 1978 1	Lecce	2–3	Milan	Lecce
	Biondi 36'; Magistrelli 69' (pen.)		10' Rivera; 14', 64' Bigon	Stadium: Comunale; Attendance: 25,000; Referee: Vittorio Benedetti

3 September 1978 2	Milan	3–0	Foggia	Milan
	Maldera 37' (pen.), 55'; Chiodi 48'			Stadium: Stadio San Siro; Attendance: 22,146; Referee: Prati

10 September 1978 3	SPAL	3–1	Milan	Ferrara
	Pezzato 24', 88'; Gibellini 42'		85' Maldera	Stadium: Comunale; Attendance: 22,000; Referee: Menegali

17 September 1978 4	Milan	2–2	Catanzaro	Milan
	Chiodi 19' (pen.); Bet 65'		59' Ranieri; 89' (pen.) Palanca	Stadium: Stadio San Siro; Attendance: 34,236; Referee: Agnolin

=== UEFA Cup ===
==== First round ====
13 September 1978	Milan	1–0	(Slovakia) FC Lokomotíva Košice	Milan
	Novellino 34'			Stadium: Stadio San Siro; Attendance: 34,529; Referee: (Malta) Charles Scerri

27 September 1978	(Slovakia) FC Lokomotíva Košice	1–0 (6–7 p)	Milan	Kosice
	Ján Kozák 81'			Stadium: Stadion Lokomotiva; Attendance: 30,000; Referee: (Czech Republic) Renggli
	Penalties
	Kozák (penalty scored); Ujhely (penalty scored); Jacko (penalty missed); Móder (penalty scored); Suchánek (penalty scored); Dobrovič (penalty scored); Fecko (penalty scored); Repík (penalty missed)		(penalty scored) Maldera; (penalty missed) Novellino; (penalty scored) Chiodi; (penalty scored) Buriani; (penalty scored) Antonelli; (penalty scored) Morini; (penalty scored) De Vecchi; (penalty scored) Baresi

==== Round of 32 ====
19 October 1978	(Bulgaria) Levski Spartak	1–1	Milan	Sofia
	Milkov 12'		11' Chiodi	Stadium: Georgi Asparuhov; Attendance: 55,000; Referee: (Austria) Linemayr

1 November 1978	Milan	3–0	(Bulgaria) Levski Spartak	Milan
	Maldera 12'; Bigon 40'; Chiodi 75'			Stadium: Stadio San Siro; Attendance: 24,635; Referee: (Scotland) Gordon

==== Eightfinals ====
23 November 1978	Milan	2–2	(England) Manchester City	Milan
	Bigon 59', 82'		37' Kidd; 57' Power	Stadium: Stadio San Siro; Attendance: 27,102; Referee: (East Germany) Einbeck

6 December 1978	(England) Manchester City	3–0	Milan	Manchester
	Booth 15'; Hartford 31'; Kidd 43'			Stadium: Maine Road; Attendance: 50,000; Referee: (West Germany) Aldinger

== Statistics ==
=== Squad statistics ===
Competition	Points	Home						Away						Total						GD
Competition	Points	G	W	D	L	Gs	Ga	G	W	D	L	Gs	Ga	G	W	D	L	Gs	Ga	GD
1978-79 Serie A	44	15	8	6	1	18	5	15	9	4	2	28	14	30	17	10	3	46	19	+27
1978-79 Coppa Italia	–	2	1	1	0	5	2	2	1	0	1	4	5	4	2	1	1	9	7	+2
1978-79 UEFA Cup	–	3	2	1	0	6	2	3	0	1	2	1	5	6	2	2	2	7	7	0
Total	–	20	11	8	1	29	9	20	10	5	5	33	24	40	21	13	6	62	33	+29

=== Players statistics ===
No.	Pos	Nat	Player	Total		1978–79 Serie A		1978-79 Coppa Italia		1978-79 UEFA Cup	
No.	Pos	Nat	Player	Apps	Goals	Apps	Goals	Apps	Goals	Apps	Goals
	GK	(Italy) ITA	Albertosi	40	-33	30	-19	4	-7	6	-7
	DF	(Italy) ITA	Collovati	34	0	27	0	2	0	5	0
	DF	(Italy) ITA	Baresi	40	0	30	0	4	0	6	0
	DF	(Italy) ITA	Bet	27	1	17	0	4	1	6	0
	DF	(Italy) ITA	Maldera	40	13	30	9	4	3	6	1
	MF	(Italy) ITA	Novellino	40	5	30	4	4	0	6	1
	MF	(Italy) ITA	Bigon	34	17	26	12	4	2	4	3
	MF	(Italy) ITA	Buriani	39	1	29	1	4	0	6	0
	MF	(Italy) ITA	De Vecchi	37	5	28	5	4	0	5	0
	FW	(Italy) ITA	Chiodi	33	11	24	7	4	2	5	2
	FW	(Italy) ITA	Antonelli	29	5	21	5	3	0	5	0
	GK	(Italy) ITA	Rigamonti	1	0	1	0	0	0	0	0
	MF	(Italy) ITA	Rivera	22	2	13	1	4	0	5	1
	MF	(Italy) ITA	Morini	19	0	14	0	2	0	3	0
	DF	(Italy) ITA	Boldini	16	1	14	1	0	0	2	0
	MF	(Italy) ITA	Capello	11	0	8	0	0	0	3	0
	FW	(Italy) ITA	Sartori	13	0	7	0	4	0	2	0
	DF	(Italy) ITA	Minoia	2	1	2	1	0	0	0	0

- Source: http://calcio-seriea.net/presenze/1978/808/
