= 1979–80 US Catanzaro season =

U.S. Catanzaro
1979–80 season
- President: Nicola Ceravolo
- Manager: Carlo Mazzone (R1–25); Saverio Leotta (R26–30)
- Stadium: Stadio Comunale
- Serie A: 12th
- Coppa Italia: Group stage
- Top goalscorer: League: Massimo Palanca (9); All: Massimo Palanca (11)

During the 1979–80 season Catanzaro competed in Serie A and Coppa Italia. It was the club's second consecutive season and fourth overall season in the Serie A. The club participated in the Coppa Italia for the 25th time.

== Squad ==
Note: Flags indicate national team as defined under FIFA eligibility rules; some limited exceptions apply. Players may hold more than one non-FIFA nationality.

Pos.	Nation	Player
GK	ITA	Massimo Mattolini
GK	ITA	Antonino Trapani
DF	ITA	Giuliano Groppi
DF	ITA	Gianpietro Marchetti
DF	ITA	Leonardo Menichini
DF	ITA	Claudio Ranieri (captain)
DF	ITA	Giuseppe Sabadini
DF	ITA	Manlio Zanini
MF	ITA	Paolo Borelli
MF	ITA	Valerio Majo

Pos.	Nation	Player
MF	ITA	Gregorio Mauro
MF	ITA	Enrico Nicolini
MF	ITA	Angelo Orazi
FW	ITA	Piero Braglia
FW	ITA	Carlo Bresciani
FW	ITA	Vito Chimenti
FW	ITA	Massimo Mauro
FW	ITA	Massimo Palanca

== Competitions ==
=== Overview ===
Competition	Started round	Final position / round	First match	Last match
Serie A	—	12th	16 September 1979	11 May 1980
Coppa Italia	Group	Group	22 August 1979	5 September 1979

Source: Competitions

=== Serie A ===
==== League table ====
Pos	Team	Pld	W	D	L	GF	GA	GD	Pts	Qualification or relegation
10	Napoli	30	7	14	9	20	20	0	28	
11	Avellino	30	7	13	10	24	32	−8	27	
12	Catanzaro	30	5	14	11	20	34	−14	24	
13	Udinese	30	3	15	12	24	38	−14	21	
14	Pescara (R)	30	4	8	18	18	44	−26	16	Relegation to Serie B

Source: RSSSF.com
Rules for classification: 1) Points; 2) Head-to-head points; 3) Head-to-head goal difference; 4) Goal difference; 5) Goals scored; 6) Draw. (Note: Head-to-head record is used only after all the matches between the teams in question have been played).
Goal difference is used in case of equal points.
(R) Relegated

==== Results summary ====
Overall								Home						Away					
Pld	W	D	L	GF	GA	GD	Pts	W	D	L	GF	GA	GD	W	D	L	GF	GA	GD
30	5	14	11	20	34	−14	24^{1}	4	8	3	12	12	0	1	6	8	8	22	−14

Last updated: 21 February 2023.
Source: webalice.it

^{1}Points were only worth 2 for a win this season

==== Results by round ====
Round	1	2	3	4	5	6	7	8	9	10	11	12	13	14	15	16	17	18	19	20	21	22	23	24	25	26	27	28	29	30
Ground	A	H	A	H	A	H	A	H	A	H	A	H	A	H	A	H	A	H	A	H	A	H	A	H	A	H	A	H	A	H
Result	D	L	D	D	L	D	L	D	L	W	D	D	D	D	D	W	L	D	L	W	L	L	L	D	L	D	D	L	W	W
Position	9	14	12	11	15	14	15	15	15	15	15	14	15	15	15	15	15	14	14	14	14	14	14	14	14	15	15	15	14	14

Source: Competitive matches
A = Away; H = Home; W = Win; D = Draw; L = Loss; P = Postponed; = Leader, 1979–80 European Cup; = 1979–80 UEFA Cup; = 1979–80 Serie B; R = 1979–80 UEFA Cup Winners' Cup

==== Matches ====
16 September 1979 1	Perugia	0–0	Catanzaro	Perugia
		Report		Stadium: Stadio Renato Curi; Referee: Ferdinando Reggiani

23 September 1979 2	Catanzaro	0–1	Juventus	Catanzaro
		Report	81' Bettega	Stadium: Stadio Comunale; Referee: Pietro D'Elia

30 September 1979 3	Ascoli	2–2	Catanzaro	Ascoli Piceno
	Iorio 6'; Moro 17' (pen.)	Report	78' (pen.) Palanca; 88' Bresciani	Stadium: Stadio Cino e Lillo Del Duca; Referee: Romeo Paparesta

7 October 1979 4	Catanzaro	0–0	Avellino	Catanzaro
		Report		Stadium: Stadio Comunale; Referee: Franco Tonolini

14 October 1979 5	Cagliari	1–0	Catanzaro	Cagliari
	Selvaggi 74'	Report		Stadium: Stadio Sant'Elia; Referee: Edigio Ballerini

21 October 1979 6	Catanzaro	0–0	Inter Milan	Catanzaro
		Report		Stadium: Stadio Comunale; Referee: Riccardo Lattanzi

28 October 1979 7	Fiorentina	3–0	Catanzaro	Florence
	Sella 14', 25'; Di Gennaro 77'	Report		Stadium: Stadio Comunale; Referee: Ferdinando Reggiani

4 November 1979 8	Catanzaro	2–2	Roma	Catanzaro
	Palanca 32', 38'	Report	78' Di Bartolomei; 86' (o.g.) Orazi	Stadium: Stadio Comunale; Referee: Giancarlo Redini

11 November 1979 9	Bologna	4–1	Catanzaro	Bologna
	Savoldi 3', 76'; Orazi 21' (o.g.); Chiarugi 25'	Report	44' Nicolini	Stadium: Stadio Comunale; Referee: Carlo Longhi

25 November 1979 10	Catanzaro	2–1	Lazio	Catanzaro
	Palanca 25', 77'	Report	84' Zucchini	Stadium: Stadio Comunale; Referee: Roberto Terpin

2 December 1979 11	Torino	0–0	Catanzaro	Turin
		Report		Stadium: Stadio Comunale; Referee: Vittorio Benedetti

9 December 1979 12	Catanzaro	1–1	Pescara	Catanzaro
	Chimenti 36'	Report	72' Cinquetti	Stadium: Stadio Comunale; Referee: Paolo Bergamo

16 December 1979 13	Milan	0–0	Catanzaro	Milan
		Report		Stadium: San Siro; Referee: Luigi Agnolin

30 December 1979 14	Catanzaro	1–1	Udinese	Catanzaro
	Nicolini 16'	Report	89' (pen.) Del Neri	Stadium: Stadio Comunale; Referee: Franco Tonolini

6 January 1980 15	Napoli	1–1	Catanzaro	Naples
	Tesser 8'	Report	47' Nicolini	Stadium: Stadio San Paolo; Referee: Arnaldo Prati

13 January 1980 16	Catanzaro	2–1	Perugia	Catanzaro
	Palanca 73'; Bresciani 86'	Report	55' Goretti	Stadium: Stadio Comunale; Referee: Riccardo Lattanzi

20 January 1980 17	Juventus	1–0	Catanzaro	Turin
	Causio 18'	Report		Stadium: Stadio Comunale; Referee: Claudio Pieri

27 January 1980 18	Catanzaro	1–1	Ascoli	Catanzaro
	Palanca 50' (pen.)	Report	85' Anastasi	Stadium: Stadio Comunale; Referee: Enzo Barbaresco

3 February 1980 19	Avellino	2–0	Catanzaro	Avellino
	Pellegrini 84'; Massa 87'	Report		Stadium: Stadio Partenio; Referee: Gino Menicucci

10 February 1980 20	Catanzaro	1–0	Cagliari	Catanzaro
	Bresciani 32'	Report		Stadium: Stadio Comunale; Referee: Maurizio Mattei

24 February 1980 21	Inter Milan	3–1	Catanzaro	Milan
	Beccalossi 15'; Oriali 36'; Altobelli 60'	Report	78' Bresciani	Stadium: San Siro; Referee: Enzo Barabaresco

2 March 1980 22	Catanzaro	0–1	Fiorentina	Catanzaro
		Report	16' Sacchetti	Stadium: Stadio Comunale; Referee: Paolo Casarin

9 March 1980 23	Roma	1–0	Catanzaro	Rome
	Pruzzo 75'	Report		Stadium: Stadio Olimpico; Referee: Gino Menicucci

23 March 1980 24	Catanzaro	0–0	Bologna	Catanzaro
		Report		Stadium: Stadio Comunale; Referee: Maurizio Mattei

30 March 1980 25	Lazio	2–0	Catanzaro	Rome
	D'Amico 72'; Groppi 82' (o.g.)	Report		Stadium: Stadio Olimpico; Referee: Pietro D'Elia

5 April 1980 26	Catanzaro	0–0	Torino	Catanzaro
		Report		Stadium: Stadio Comunale; Referee: Rosario Lo Bello

13 April 1980 27	Pescara	1–1	Catanzaro	Pescara
	Niboli 81' (pen.)	Report	79' Nicolini	Stadium: Stadio Adriatico; Referee: Alberto Michelotti

27 April 1980 28	Catanzaro	0–3	Milan	Catanzaro
		Report	12' Galluzzo; 29' Antonelli; 48' (o.g.) Groppi	Stadium: Stadio Comunale; Referee: Maurizio Mattei

4 May 1980 29	Udinese	1–2	Catanzaro	Udine
	Vriz 7'	Report	24' Sabadini; 61' (pen.) Palanca	Stadium: Stadio Friuli; Referee: Arnaldo Prati

11 May 1980 30	Catanzaro	2–0	Napoli	Catanzaro
	Palanca 40'; Bresciani 46'	Report		Stadium: Stadio Comunale; Referee: Domenico Lops

=== Coppa Italia ===
==== Group stage ====
===== Table (Group 2) =====
Pos	Team	Pld	W	D	L	GF	GA	GD	Pts
1	Torino	4	4	0	0	7	2	+5	8
2	Catanzaro	4	2	1	1	4	3	+1	5
3	Palermo	4	1	2	1	4	2	+2	4
4	Parma	4	0	2	2	1	4	−3	2
5	Lecce	4	0	1	3	4	9	−5	1

===== Matches (Group 2) =====
22 August 1979 1	Catanzaro	2–1	Lecce	Catanzaro
	Nicolini 21'; Palanca 71'		4' Cannito	Stadium: Stadio Comunale; Referee: Giancarlo Redini

26 August 1979 2	Parma	0–1	Catanzaro	Parma
			71' Orazi	Referee: Castaldi

2 September 1979 3	Catanzaro	1–1	Palermo	Catanzaro
	Palanca 73'		59' Magistrelli	Stadium: Stadio Comunale; Referee: Franco Tonolini

5 September 1979 4	Torino	1–0	Catanzaro	Turin
	Graziani 15'			Stadium: Comunale; Referee: Gino Menicucci

== Squad statistics ==
No.	Pos	Nat	Player	Total		Serie A		Coppa Italia	
No.	Pos	Nat	Player	Apps	Goals	Apps	Goals	Apps	Goals
	GK	(Italy) ITA	Antonino Trapani	6	-5	6	-5	0	0
	GK	(Italy) ITA	Massimo Mattolini	29	-32	25	-29	4	-3
	DF	(Italy) ITA	Giuliano Groppi	31	0	27	0	4	0
	DF	(Italy) ITA	Gianpietro Marchetti	10	0	10	0	0	0
	DF	(Italy) ITA	Leonardo Menichini	30	0	26	0	4	0
	DF	(Italy) ITA	Claudio Ranieri	31	0	28	0	3	0
	DF	(Italy) ITA	Giuseppe Sabadini	23	1	19	1	4	0
	DF	(Italy) ITA	Manlio Zanini	27	0	25	0	2	0
	MF	(Italy) ITA	Paoloo Borelli	20	0	16	0	4	0
	MF	(Italy) ITA	Valerio Majo	29	0	25	0	4	0
	MF	(Italy) ITA	Gregorio Mauro	3	0	3	0	0	0
	MF	(Italy) ITA	Enrico Nicolini	33	5	29	4	4	1
	MF	(Italy) ITA	Angelo Orazi	32	1	28	0	4	1
	FW	(Italy) ITA	Piero Braglia	24	0	20	0	4	0
	FW	(Italy) ITA	Carlo Bresciani	17	5	14	5	3	0
	FW	(Italy) ITA	Vito Chimenti	30	1	26	1	4	0
	FW	(Italy) ITA	Massimo Mauro	2	0	2	0	0	0
	FW	(Italy) ITA	Massimo Palanca	33	11	29	9	4	2

- Source: https://web.archive.org/web/20180618203358/http://www.webalice.it/stasin/pdf/1979-80.pdf, http://calcio-seriea.net/presenze/1979/831/ and https://www.historical-lineups.com/wp-content/uploads/2016/09/1979-80.pdf
