= History of AC Milan =

This is the history of Associazione Calcio Milan, commonly referred to as A.C. Milan or simply Milan (Italian pronunciation: [ˈmiːlan]), an Italian professional football club based in Milan, Lombardy.

== Foundation and early years ==
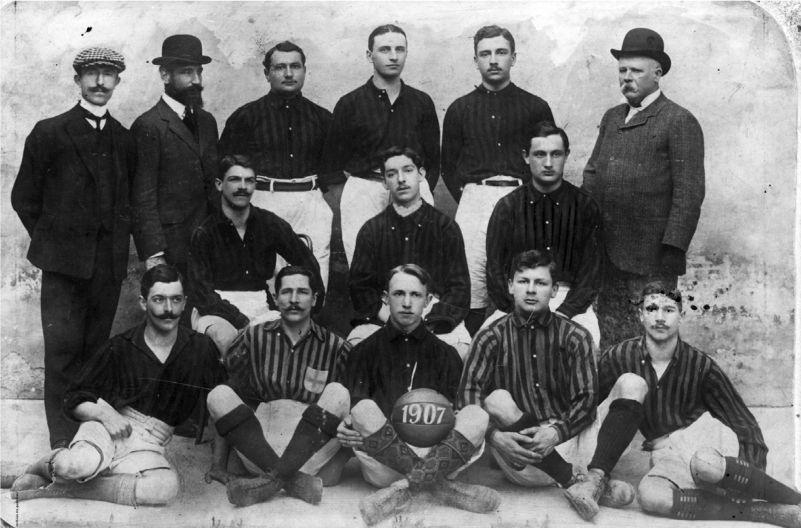
The AC Milan team of 1907

A.C. Milan was founded as Milan Foot-Ball and Cricket Club in 1899 by English expatriate Herbert Kilpin. The club claims 16 December of that year as their foundation date, but historical evidence seems to suggest that the club was actually founded on 18 December. However, with the club's charter being lost, the date remains debated. Alfred Edwards, was the club's first elected president, a former British vice-consul in Milan and a well-known personality of the Milanese high society. Initially, the team included a cricket section, managed by Edward Berra, and a football section, managed by Kilpin.

The official colours chosen were red and black. Immediately the team gained relevant notability under Kilpin's guidance. The first trophy to be won was the Medaglia del Re (King's Medal) in January 1900, and the team later won three national leagues, in 1901, 1906 and 1907. The triumph of 1901 was particularly relevant because it ended the consecutive series of wins of Genoa, which had been the only team to have won prior to 1901.

The club proved successful in the first decade of its existence, with several important trophies won, including, among others, two more editions of the aforementioned Medaglia del Re, the Palla Dapples 23 times and the FGNI tournament five times, a competition organized by the Italian Gymnastics Federation but not officially recognized by the Italian Football Federation.

In 1908, issues over the signing of foreign players led to a split and the formation of F.C. Internazionale Milano, which caused one of the former Milan founders Giovanni Paramithiotti to become president of Internazionale Milano instead.

In 1909 Milan experienced its first change of ownership, when Piero Pirelli became club's new chairman. He would remain in charge for 19 years, until he resigned in 1928, for a record timespan, which Silvio Berlusconi had only beaten 80 years later.

== 1910–1949 ==
In 1916, Milan won the Federal Cup, a national trophy that had replaced the Italian league, suspended because of World War I. This cup was never recognized as an Italian title. In the following two seasons, Milan won the most important tournaments in place during the war at a regional level (the national championship was still suspended): the Coppa Lombarda in 1917 and the Coppa Mauro in 1918, in this case after beating Inter in the decisive match with a historic 8-1 score.

In 1919, the team changed its name to Milan Football Club. After their first triumphs, Milan could not continue with their former high-level success, obtaining only a number of half-table placements, even if always playing in the top Italian division.

Two of the most critical players in this decade were the Belgian forward Louis Van Hege, who scored 97 goals in 88 official matches, and the defender Renzo De Vecchi, nicknamed il figlio di Dio (the son of God).

Between the two World Wars, despite always remaining in the first division, Milan never went beyond the third place, which was achieved in 1937-38 and 1940-41. In 1924 Vittorio Pozzo, who won the World Cup in 1934 and 1938 as coach of the Italy national team, was hired as manager of the club. However, results were not positive, and after two seasons he was sacked.

In 1926, chairman Piero Pirelli built a new stadium exclusively for Milan to play in. The San Siro became the only home of Milan from that moment onwards. The stadium was inaugurated with a derby against Inter, won with a 6-3 final score. Among the Rossoneri's scorers of that day was Giuseppe Santagostino, one of the most relevant players of the club in the 1920s: he scored 103 goals in 233 appearances.

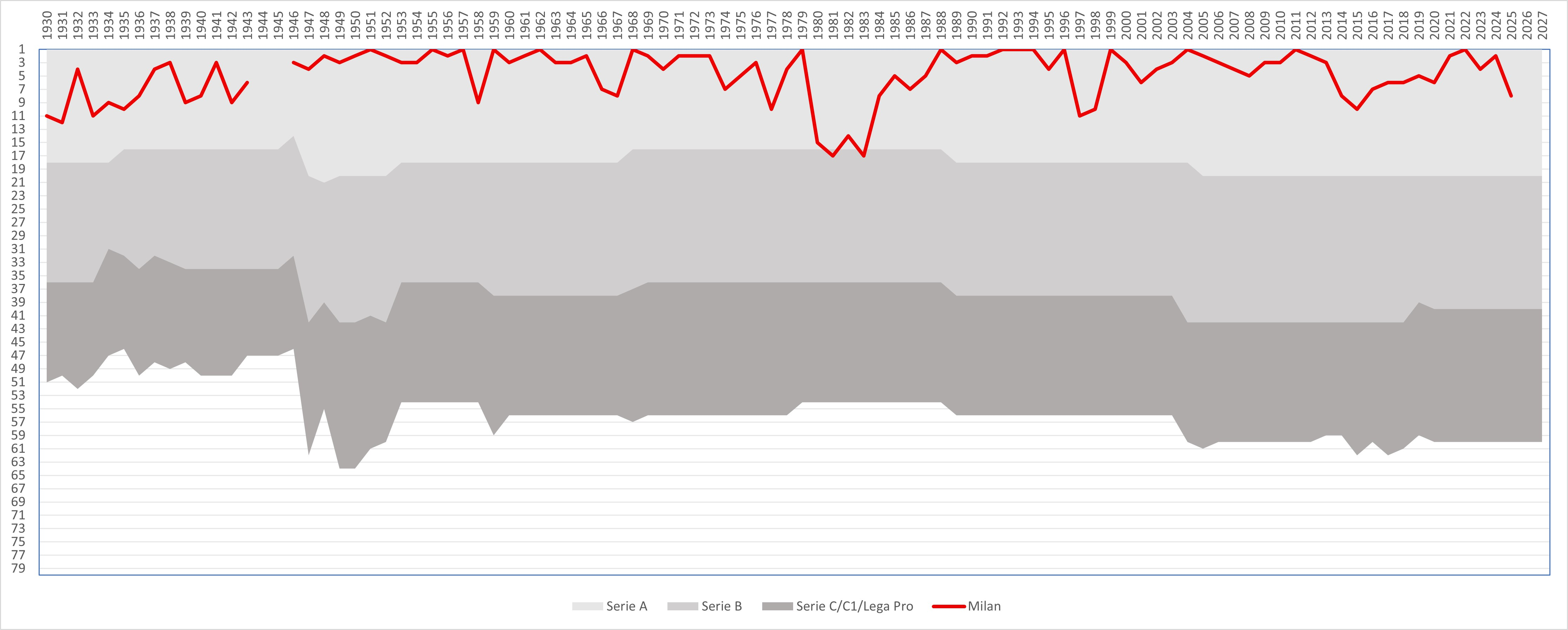
The performance of Milan in the Italian football league structure since the first season of a unified Serie A (1929/30).

The 1930s marked Milan's debut in international competitions, with the participation to the 1938 Mitropa Cup. Between 1935 and 1939 Milan reached four consecutive Coppa Italia semifinals, with as many eliminations.

The most important player of the decade was Aldo Boffi, who was three times top scorer of the Serie A (in 1938-39, 1939–40 and 1941–42) and who scored a total of 136 goals for Milan, which made him the 5th all-time top scorer of the club.

In 1939, the fascist regime imposed a new italianized name, Associazione Calcio Milano, for the team. However, that name was partly abandoned after World War II, but the initial part was maintained: the team was called Associazione Calcio Milan, which remains the club's current official name.

== 1950s ==
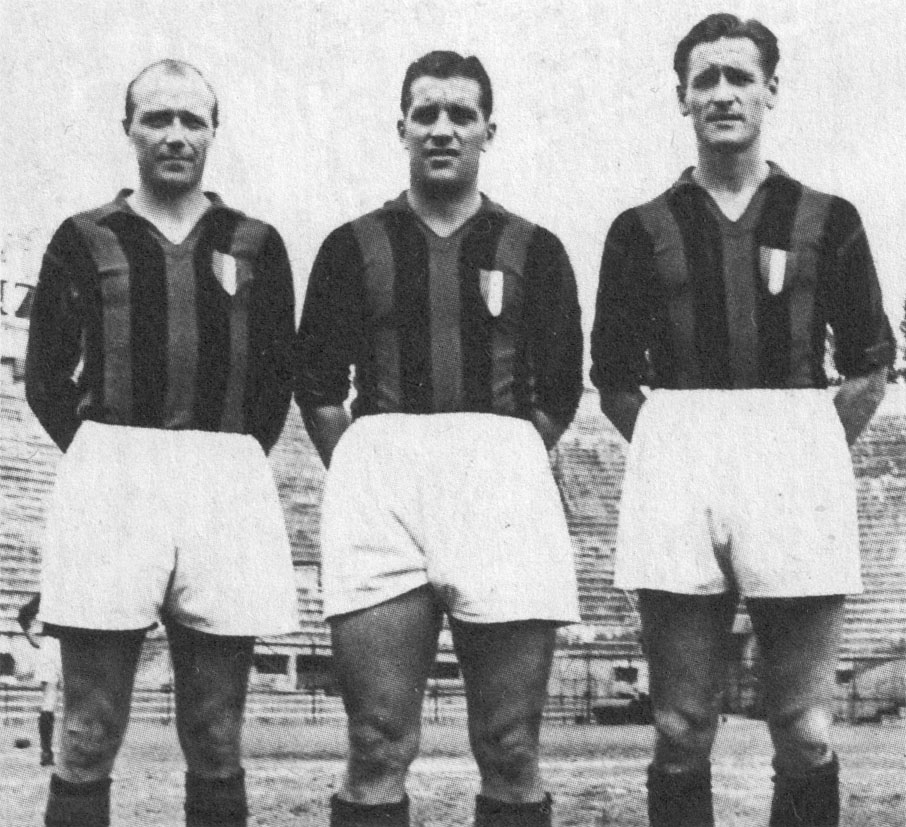
The Gre-No-Li trio: Gunnar Gren, Gunnar Nordahl, and Nils Liedholm

In the post-war period, Milan was always among the top three Italian teams in the Serie A standings (with the exception of a 4th place in 1946–47), and won the Scudetto in 1951, the first time since 1907. Il Grande Milan included the famous "Gre-No-Li", a trio of Swedish players composed by Gunnar Gren, Gunnar Nordahl and Nils Liedholm, all previous Olympic winners. That team also fielded quality players such as Lorenzo Buffon, Cesare Maldini and Carlo Annovazzi. Domestically, Milan won the Serie A title also in 1955, 1957 and 1959. Between the 1947–48 and 1956–57 seasons, Milan always finished amongst the top three clubs in the league table. One of the most resounding victory of this period was the 7–1 win against Juventus in Turin on 5 February 1950, with Gunnar Nordahl scoring a hat-trick.

Béla Guttmann was appointed manager of A.C. Milan in 1953. Guttmann had them top of Serie A 19 games into his second season in charge when a string of disputes with the board led to his dismissal. He later told a stunned press conference "I have been sacked even though I am neither a criminal nor a homosexual. Goodbye." From then on he insisted on a clause in his contract that he could not be sacked if his team were top of the table.

This decade witnessed also the first European successes of Milan, with the triumphs in the 1951 and 1956 Latin Cup. Milan was also the first Italian club to take part to the newly born European Cup in the 1955-56 season, and reached the final two years later, when they were defeated by Real Madrid.

== 1960s ==

1963 European Cup Final starting lineup

1969 European Cup Final starting lineup

Milan returned to win a football league in 1961–62 under manager Nereo Rocco, an innovative football coach known as the inventor of the catenaccio tactic. The team included a young Gianni Rivera and José Altafini. The following season, in large part due to Altafini's prolific goal-scoring, Milan won their first European Cup (later known as UEFA Champion League) by defeating Portugal's Benfica 2–1. This also marked the first time an Italian team won the European Cup.

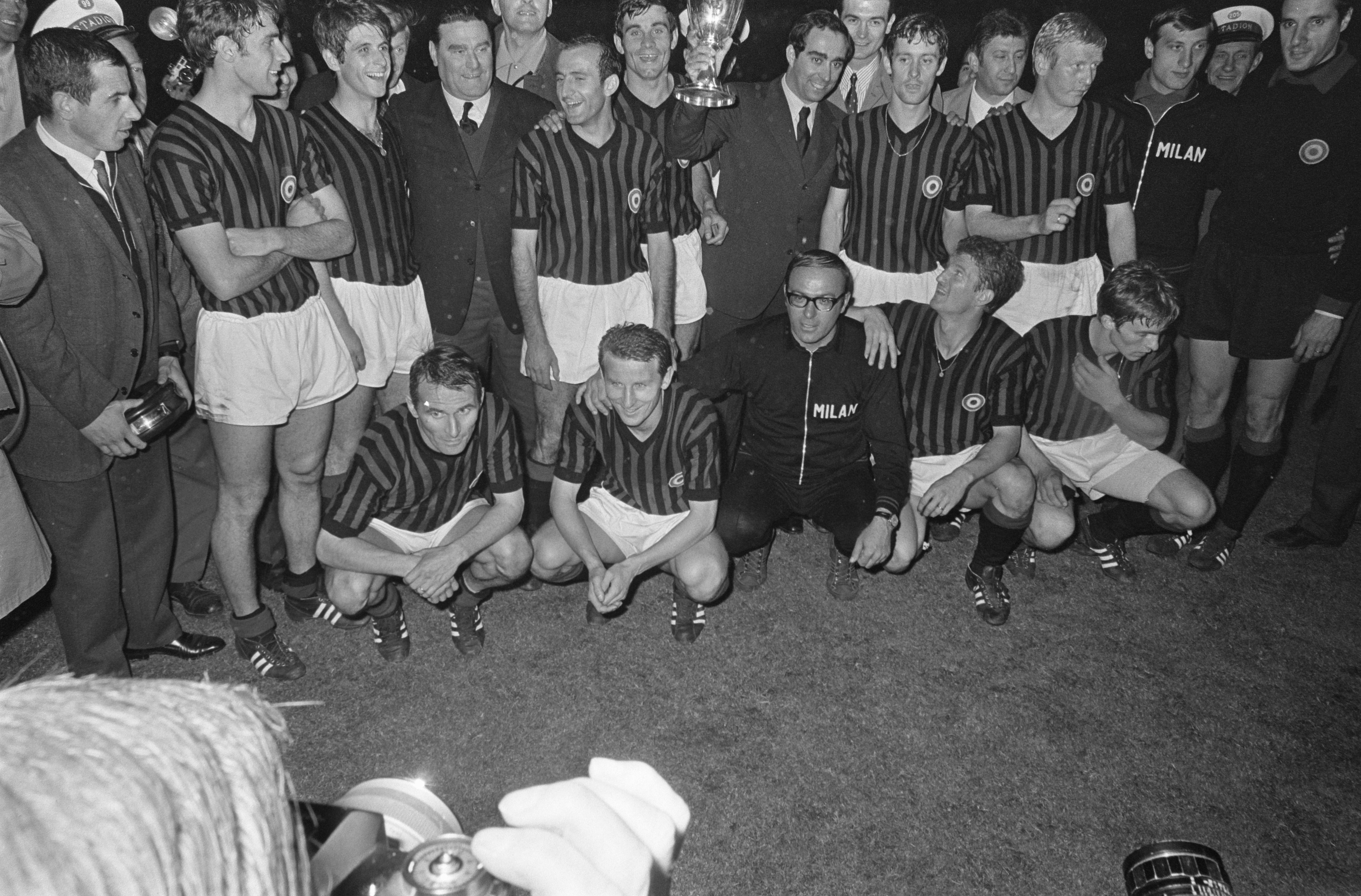
AC Milan players after winning the European Cup Winners' Cup final against German side Hamburger SV in 1968

Despite the successes of the decade's early years, Milan won fewer trophies throughout the 1960s, mainly because of the heavy competition of Helenio Herrera's Internazionale, Milan's city rivals. Its next Scudetto arrived only in 1967–68 through the offense output of Pierino Prati, the Serie A's top-scorer that season, as well as the European Cup Winners' Cup, won against Hamburger SV thanks to the two goals of Kurt Hamrin. In the next season, Milan won its second European Cup, 4–1 over Ajax, and in 1969 won its first Intercontinental Cup after defeating Argentina's Estudiantes La Plata in two dramatic legs (3–0, 1–2).

== 1970s ==
In the 1970s, Milan won three Coppa Italia and its second Cup Winners' Cup during the 1972–73 season after beating Leeds United with a 1-0 score. In 1972, they reached the semi-final of the UEFA Cup, although falling to eventual Cup winners Tottenham Hotspur. But the main goal of the Rossoneri was the tenth Scudetto, which would have awarded the first stella ("star") to the team. For three consecutive seasons (1971, 1972 and 1973), Milan ended as second in the league, after some memorable duels with Inter and Juventus. Despite a strong 1972–73 season providing their best opportunity to achieve it, a dramatic defeat against Hellas Verona on the last day of the season end the chance.

Milan had to wait until 1979 to win their tenth Scudetto, primarily being led by Gianni Rivera, who retired from football after this final triumph. That year the debut of Franco Baresi, at his first full season with the club.

After this success, the team went into decline. The club in 1980 was involved in the Totonero scandal and as punishment was relegated to Serie B for the first time in its history. The scandal was centred around a betting syndicate paying players and officials to fix the outcome of matches.

== 1980s ==

1989 European Cup Final starting lineup

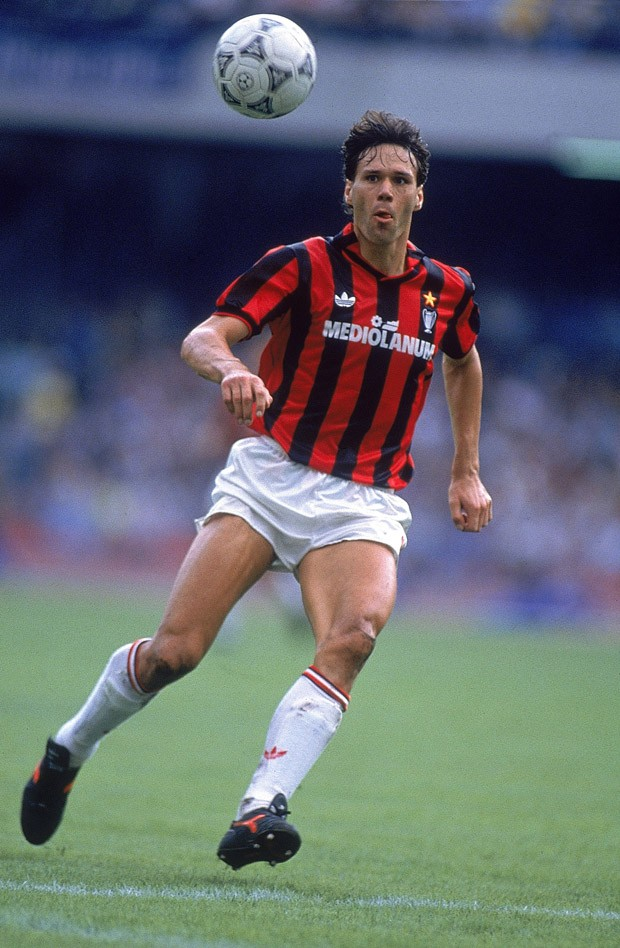
Marco van Basten was part of the Dutch trio that brought glory back to Milan.

In 1980–81, Milan handily won the Serie B championship enjoying a swift return in 1981–82 to Serie A, but then suffering its worst season ever and being relegated again. In 1983, Milan won the Serie B title for the second time in three seasons to return to Serie A, where they achieved a sixth-place finish in 1983–84.

Financial troubles following with poor times and a lack of success on the pitch. Milan was saved from bankruptcy on 20 February 1986 by Silvio Berlusconi, a Milanese entrepreneur. He brought in rising coach Arrigo Sacchi, three Dutch players (Marco van Basten, Frank Rijkaard and Ruud Gullit), and the Italian internationals Roberto Donadoni, Carlo Ancelotti, Giovanni Galli and Paolo Maldini in the attempt to return the team to glory,

Sacchi and Milan won the 1987–88 Scudetto after an impressive recovery over the Diego Maradona-led Napoli. The next season (1988–89), Milan won its third European Cup after defeating Steaua București 4–0 in the final, and its second Intercontinental Cup against National de Medellín (1–0, goal in the last minute of extra time).

== 1990s ==
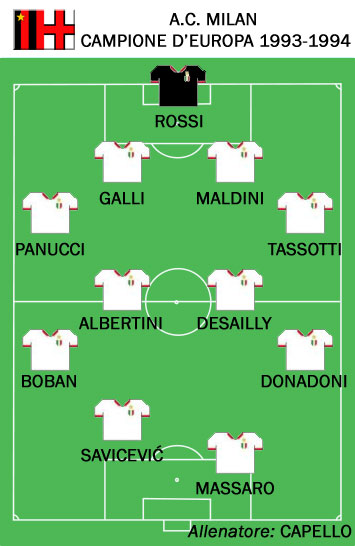
Milan's starting lineup in its defeat of Barcelona in the 1994 Champions League Final

The team repeated their European Cup triumph the following season after defeating Benfica 1–0, then earned its third overall and second consecutive Intercontinental Cup, after beating Olimpia Asunción in 1990. Their European-winning line-up were: Giovanni Galli; Mauro Tassotti, Alessandro Costacurta, Franco Baresi, Paolo Maldini; Angelo Colombo, Frank Rijkaard, Carlo Ancelotti, Roberto Donadoni; Ruud Gullit, Marco van Basten. The team was referred to as Gli Immortali ("The Immortals"). This team has been voted the best club side of all time in a global poll of experts conducted by World Soccer magazine.

With Sacchi leaving Milan in 1991 to coach the Italy national team, Fabio Capello was hired and under him, the Rossoneri kept being successful and came to be known as Gli Invicibili ("The Invincibles"). With an unprecedented 58-match run with no defeats, the Invincibili boasted the likes of Mauro Tassotti, Franco Baresi, Alessandro Costacurta and Paolo Maldini as one of the strongest defenses in football history, along with Marcel Desailly and Roberto Donadoni in midfield and Dejan Savićević, Zvonimir Boban and Daniele Massaro in attack.

In addition to three consecutive Scudetti from 1992 to 1994, including the feat going undefeated in 1991–92, Milan reached the Champions League final in a record three consecutive years. In 1993 Milan was defeated by Marseille, a result later disputed by a match-fixing scandal in the French Ligue 1 involving Marseille's then-club president Bernard Tapie. In 1994, however, Milan defeated Barcelona after a sensational 4–0 win, while in 1995, Milan fell to Ajax. Then, in 1995–96, led by stars Roberto Baggio, Marco Simone and George Weah, Milan earned its 15th Italian championship. Milan's primary line-up under Capello in that winning season was: Sebastiano Rossi; Christian Panucci, Alessandro Costacurta, Franco Baresi, Paolo Maldini; Roberto Donadoni, Demetrio Albertini, Marcel Desailly; Zvonimir Boban; George Weah, Roberto Baggio.

=== 1996–97 ===
After the departure of Fabio Capello in 1996, Milan recruited the Uruguayan Óscar Tabárez, but they struggled under the manager and were winless in their opening matches. In an attempt to regain former glories, the club brought back Arrigo Sacchi to replace Tabárez. The team then suffered their worst-ever Serie A defeat after being humiliated by Juventus at the San Siro, 1–6. Milan signed new players like Ibrahim Ba, Christophe Dugarry and Edgar Davids, though this did not stop Milan's struggles—they finished the year 11th in Serie A.

=== 1997–98 ===
Sacchi was replaced with the returning Fabio Capello in the following season, whose new Milan signed many potential players like Christian Ziege, Patrick Kluivert, Jesper Blomqvist and Leonardo. The acquisitions, however, did little to reverse the team's recent ill fortunes—Milan still finished mid-table in tenth, prompting the termination of Capello.

=== 1998–99 ===
In its search for a new manager, Alberto Zaccheroni attracted Milan's attention. Zaccheroni was the manager of Udinese who had ended the Season 1997–98 in third place. Milan signed Zaccheroni along with two of his players at Udinese, Oliver Bierhoff and Thomas Helveg. Milan also signed Roberto Ayala, Luigi Sala and Andres Guglielminpietro and with a 3–4–3 formation, Zaccheroni brought the club's 16th Scudetto back to Milan. The winning line-up was: Christian Abbiati; Luigi Sala, Alessandro Costacurta, Paolo Maldini; Thomas Helveg, Demetrio Albertini, Massimo Ambrosini, Andres Guglielminpietro; Zvonimir Boban, George Weah, Oliver Bierhoff.

=== 1999–2000 ===
Despite success in the previous season, Zaccheroni failed to transform Milan to the great team it used to be. The following season, despite the emergence of the Ukrainian Andriy Shevchenko, Milan disappointed their fans in both the Champions League and Serie A, exiting the former after winning just one out of six Group Stage matches and ending the domestic season third, never representing a realistic challenge to the top two of Lazio and Juventus.

== 2000s ==
=== 2000–2001 ===
The following season, Milan qualified for the 2000–01 Champions League by defeating Dinamo Zagreb 6–1 on aggregate. Milan started the Champions League on a high note, defeating Beşiktaş from Turkey and Spanish giants Barcelona, who at the time consisted of international world-class superstars in Rivaldo and Patrick Kluivert. But Milan's form began to seriously decline, drawing against a number of teams (which are seen as technically inferior to Milan), but mainly losing by a 3–0 scoreline to Juventus in Serie A and 1–0 to Leeds United. In the second round of the Champions League, Milan won once and drew four times. They failed to beat Deportivo de La Coruña in the last game and Zaccheroni was subsequently fired.

Cesare Maldini, the father of team captain Paolo, was appointed and prospects immediately improved. Maldini's official coaching debut at Milan started with a 4–0 win over Bari, featuring a young Antonio Cassano. It was also under Maldini's leadership that Milan defeated their city rivals Inter with an outstanding score of 6–0, a score which has never been repeated and in which Serginho starred in the match. After this peak of form, however, Milan started losing again, including a disappointing 1–0 defeat to Vicenza, with the only goal in the match scored by a young Luca Toni. In spite of these results, the Milan board of directors were adamant that Milan reach fourth place in the league at the end of the season, but Maldini failed and the team ended sixth.

=== 2001–02 ===
Milan began the 2001–02 campaign signing more star players, including Javi Moreno and Cosmin Contra, who both helped Alavés reach the 2001 UEFA Cup final. The team also signed Kakha Kaladze (from Dynamo Kyiv), Rui Costa (from Fiorentina), Filippo Inzaghi (from Juventus), Martin Laursen (from Hellas Verona), Jon Dahl Tomasson (from Feyenoord), Ümit Davala (from Galatasaray) and Andrea Pirlo (from rivals Inter). Replacing Cesare Maldini was Fatih Terim, who had moderate initial success with the team. After five months, however, Milan was far removed from the top five in the league, and Terim was subsequently sacked for failing to meet the board of directors' expectations. He was replaced by Carlo Ancelotti, despite rumours that Franco Baresi would be the new manager. Despite the injury problems of full-back Paolo Maldini, Ancelotti was successful and led Milan to a fourth-place finish, thus earning a place in the Champions League. Milan's starting line at that point was Christian Abbiati; Cosmin Contra, Alessandro Costacurta, Martin Laursen, Kakha Kaladze; Gennaro Gattuso, Demetrio Albertini, Serginho; Rui Costa; Andriy Shevchenko, Filippo Inzaghi.

=== 2002–03 (3rd in Serie A, Champions of Europe) ===
Milan ended the season with their sixth Champions League trophy in 2003. En route to the final at Old Trafford, Manchester, Milan beat their cross city rivals Inter in the semi-finals and beat another other Italian rival, Juventus, in a dramatic penalty shoot-out. That same season, Milan placed third in Serie A and won both the Coppa Italia and UEFA Super Cup. The team's Champions League-winning starting line-up was: Dida; Alessandro Costacurta, Alessandro Nesta, Paolo Maldini, Kakha Kaladze; Gennaro Gattuso, Andrea Pirlo, Clarence Seedorf; Rui Costa; Andriy Shevchenko, Filippo Inzaghi. The following season, Milan signed Kaká. The team earned the nickname "I Meravigliosi" ("The Amazings").

=== 2003–04 (Champions in Serie-A, Quarter Finals in Champions League) ===
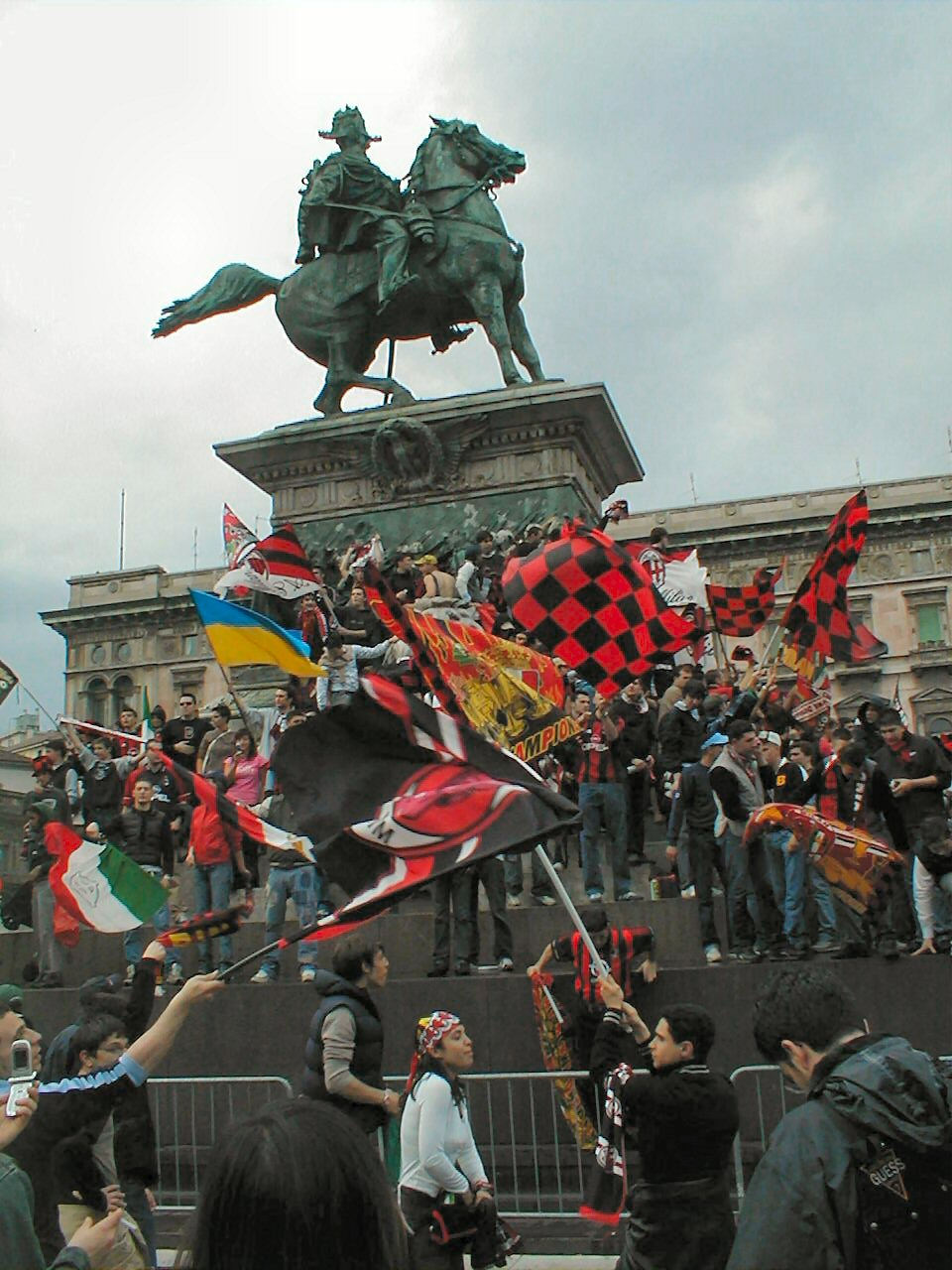
May 2004: celebrating the 17th scudetto in Piazza del Duomo

Milan set a points record to win the Scudetto with a team that was largely kept constant for nearly five years—an attack spearheaded by striker Andriy Shevchenko, playmaking by Kaká and defence by Alessandro Nesta and Paolo Maldini. Milan's season, however, was not perfect as they were beaten by Deportivo La Coruña 0–4 in the quarter-finals of the 2003–04 Champions League despite winning the first leg 4–1 at the San Siro. Despite being Italian champions, Milan showed, as some critics said, weak midfield character that would repeat itself in the Champions League final in the following season. Nevertheless, the squad proved successful and able to express a brilliant style of play for many months.

=== 2004–05 (2nd in Serie A, 2nd in Champions League) ===
Hernán Crespo, on loan from Chelsea, proved to be a solid acquisition for Milan, while midfielder Massimo Ambrosini scored an incredible late goal against PSV. The season, however, ended in disastrous defeat in Istanbul's Atatürk Stadium in the 2005 Champions League final. In the game, Milan relinquished a 3–0 half-time lead against Liverpool after conceding three goals in a span of just six minutes before ultimately losing 3–2 on penalties. Milan ended the season in second place to Juve in Serie A and Italian Super Cup champions over Lazio.

=== 2005–06 (3rd in Serie A, Semi Finals in Champions League) ===
Milan's Serie A campaign appeared to be one of their most successful in recent years. The team ended the season with a league-high 28 wins, but could not edge Juventus in the standings due to their record-setting pace of 91 points, a record point total since broken. This success was nullified by the Calciopoli scandal. Milan were named in the Serie A scandal of 2006 and deprived of 44 out of the 88 points they gained in the season. In addition, Milan would start their 2006–07 campaign with –15 points. These point reductions, however, were later reduced to 30 and –8 respectively, providing Milan the chance to compete in the 2006–07 Champions League.

Milan's efforts in the Champions League that year also proved promising, though they ultimately fell short. After coming out on top of their group, Milan advanced to the knockout phase of the tournament, first defeating Bayern Munich on aggregate and then France's Lyon 3–1 on aggregate. In the semi-finals, they were eliminated by eventual champions Barcelona 0–1 on aggregate, where Milan striker Andriy Shevchenko had a goal controversially disallowed.

=== 2006–07 (4th in Serie A, Won UEFA Champions League) ===
Milan's Serie A campaign began with an −8-point penalty resulting from the Calciopoli scandal. After a lackluster first half of the season that saw Milan hover in the middle of the standings, several January transfer acquisitions, including World Cup winner Massimo Oddo and Brazilian legend Ronaldo, reinvigorated the club. By the end of the campaign, Milan surged up the table to finish fourth, thus assuring their participation for the 2007–08 Champions League.

While their Serie A campaign proved moderately successful, the 2006–07 season is best remembered for the team's performance in the Champions League. The penalties imposed after the Calciopoli scandal resulted in Milan being seeded third in the final 2005–06 Serie A table, thus the team was forced to play in the Champion's League Qualifiers, where they were matched-up against former European champion Red Star Belgrade. Milan were victorious in the qualifier and advanced to the group phase, which they would eventually win.

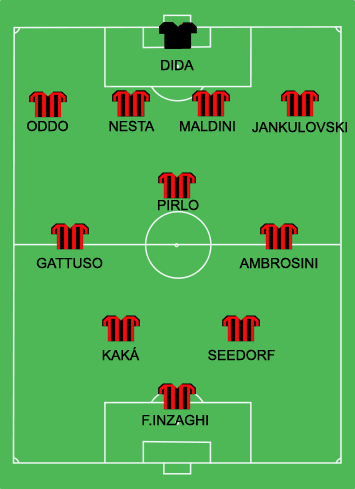
Milan's starting lineup against Liverpool in Athens

Milan survived a first round fight, defeating Celtic (eventual champions of that year's Scottish Premier League) 1–0 on aggregate after an extra time goal by Kaká. Milan would then go on to defeat Bayern Munich 4–2 on aggregate (2–2 at San Siro and 2–0 at Allianz Arena) to reach the semi-finals, marking the third consecutive, and fourth time in five years, that Milan has reached the final four of the competition. The first leg of the semi-final was played against Manchester United at Old Trafford. Manchester scored early on a goal from Cristiano Ronaldo, but Milan answered back through a brace from Kaká, ensuring a 1–2 lead at half-time. United would ultimately prove victorious, however, due to two second-half goals from striker Wayne Rooney. This match was regarded by the media and UEFA President Michel Platini as the greatest match in recent memories. The second leg of the semi-final was played at San Siro on 2 May, where Milan played a near-perfect first-half, taking a 2–0 lead into the break with goals from Kaká and Clarence Seedorf. A 78-minute goal by Alberto Gilardino sealed the victory for the home side.

Milan advanced to the final, pitting them in a rematch against their 2005 finals opponent, Liverpool. The match was played at the Olympic Stadium in Athens on 23 May 2007 with Milan prevailing 2–1 with both goals coming from Filippo Inzaghi. With the victory, the club affirmed its status as one of European football's elite, with three Champions League final appearances in five years, including two victories.

=== 2007–08 (5th in Serie A, Eliminated First Knockout Round in Europe, Won FIFA Club World Cup) ===
In the wake of a seventh European Cup/Champions League title, Milan continued their international success by winning the 2007 UEFA Super Cup against Sevilla in a game marked with sadness over the recent on-field death of Sevilla player Antonio Puerta. Milan's Champions League success also made the club eligible to compete in the 2007 FIFA Club World Cup, where they would win their 18th officially recognized international trophy, tying them for most club international trophies in the world. Ironically, Milan won their 18th title in a match against Boca Juniors, the team they were tied for the record.

These two trophies, however, only served as consolation for a disappointing season for Milan. The club had a slow start in Serie A, often finding it difficult to score after a pre-season injury to Ronaldo. This, coupled with their aging backline and some deteriorating performances by goalkeeper Dida, found the club sitting mid-table for the majority of the season, though new signing Alexandre Pato was a bright light for an otherwise dark season for Milan. By the end of the domestic campaign, Fiorentina edged Milan out for fourth place in the standings, knocking them out of qualification for the 2008–09 Champions League, the team's first failure to reach the tournament since 2001–02.

Milan's involvement in the 2007–08 edition of the Champions League was also forgettable. While the club won its group, they were quickly eliminated by Arsenal in the first knockout round. Prior to this season, Milan had made it to at least the quarterfinals of every Champions League going back to the 2002–03 edition.

=== 2008–09 (3rd in Serie A, Eliminated First Knockout Round in UEFA Cup) ===
After a poor domestic season the year prior, the club made numerous additions during the off-season, signing Ronaldinho from Barcelona and re-acquiring former star Andriy Shevchenko from Chelsea, in addition to adding Gianluca Zambrotta, Marco Borriello and Mathieu Flamini, amongst others. They also later added international sensation David Beckham during the January transfer window on loan from the LA Galaxy of Major League Soccer (MLS). Despite the high-profile additions, the season started poorly after two consecutive losses. The team bounced back, however, rising to first spot in the table for one week in the first half of the season before later dropping behind rivals Inter, who would go on to win their fourth-straight Serie A championship.

The team also fared poorly in the 2008–09 UEFA Cup competition. After winning their group and advancing to the knockout stage, the team was eliminated by eventual finalist Werder Bremen.

Perhaps the most notable aspect of the 2008–09 season was the retirement of footballing legend Paolo Maldini, who played all of his professional club games for Milan in a career that spanned 25 years.

=== 2009–10 (3rd in Serie A, Eliminated First Knockout Round in Europe) ===
The season started with the dismissal of the head coach Carlo Ancelotti and the hiring of his replacement, former Milan player Leonardo. During the transfer season, the club's major activity was the sale of Kaká for a then-world record transfer fee of €64.5 million to Real Madrid.

The start of the season was poor, as the team failed to win several matches. But the results started to change in the victory against Roma, and the crucial victory over Real Madrid at the Santiago Bernabéu Stadium. The season included the resurgence of Ronaldinho, Marco Borriello and new players Luca Antonini and Ignazio Abate. Although the Rossoneri achieved some important results, they were eliminated from the Champions League by Manchester United and lost the Serie A race to Inter. At the end of the season, Leonardo resigned despite Milan's wishes to keep him in the position.

== 2010s ==
=== 2010–11 (1st in Serie A, Eliminated First Knockout Round in Europe) ===
Following a season of relative disappointment, with regards to signings and results, club president Silvio Berlusconi reinforced Milan by signing Zlatan Ibrahimović in a loan deal from Barcelona, Robinho from Manchester City for €18 million and Kevin-Prince Boateng on loan from Genoa. Following the resignation of Leonardo, Milan appointed Massimiliano Allegri, previously head coach of Cagliari.

Following a mixed start to the season (including a 4–0 win against Lecce, draws against Catania and Lazio, and a loss to Cesena), Milan began performing well and soon reached the top of the Serie A table from November onwards. The new signings of Ibrahimović and Robinho paid dividends; along with Pato, the three would score 19 goals between them (Ibrahimović, nine; Robinho, six; Pato, four) by the end of the 2010 calendar year. The defensive partnership of Alessandro Nesta and Thiago Silva in front of goalkeeper Christian Abbiati also gave Milan one of Serie A's top defences.

By the end of 2010, and the beginning of 2011, Milan had faced an injury crisis that had seen players Andrea Pirlo, Massimo Ambrosini, Filippo Inzaghi, Gianluca Zambrotta, Kevin-Prince Boateng, Daniele Bonera, Luca Antonini, Alexandre Pato and Alessandro Nesta all injured. The team would then be enforced during the winter transfer period with the signings of Antonio Cassano, Mark van Bommel, Urby Emanuelson, Dídac Vilà and Nicola Legrottaglie. The signing of Cassano had also paved way for the exit of Ronaldinho, who joined Rio de Janeiro-based side Flamengo in Brazil. Many of these signings, however, had already participated in the Champions League earlier in the season, meaning that they were cup-tied and thus unable to play for Milan the year's tournament. This, coupled with the numerous injuries, resulted in Milan's elimination from the Champions League at the hands of Tottenham Hotspur in the first knockout round.

In the league, however, Milan continued to put in strong performances, including convincing wins against Inter and Napoli, the league's other title-contenders. Following a 0–0 draw with Roma on 7 May, Milan mathematically claimed their 18th Scudetto.

=== 2012–13 (3rd in Serie A, Eliminated First Knockout Round in Europe) ===
In the 2012–13 Champions League knockout round, Milan won their home leg 2–0 over Barcelona. This was unfortunately not enough as they were comprehensively beaten 4–0 in the return leg. A third-place league finish behind Juventus and Napoli secured a Champions League berth for the following season.

=== 2013–14 (8th in Serie A, Eliminated First Knockout Round in Europe) ===
The 2013–14 Serie A season saw the return of club-icon Kaka, joining on a free transfer during the summer transfer window following a poor spell at Real Madrid. Despite this, Milan made a poor start to the season, that saw them lose four of their opening 10 matches, including an opening day loss to Hellas Verona. Following a 4–3 defeat away to Sassuolo that left the club in 11th place, Massimiliano Allegri was sacked and was replaced by another club icon, Clarence Seedorf. At the time, Seedorf was still playing at Brazilian side Botafogo, but terminated his contract to take up the managerial role. Despite overseeing Milan's first 5-match winning streak since 2011, as well as a win against city-rivals Inter, Seedorf was sacked as Milan finished in 8th. During the Dutchman's time at the helm of the club, Milan gained a total of 35 out of a possible 57 points - the fourth-most out of all Serie A sides (one less than Napoli's corresponding total and six less than Roma's).

At a European level, Milan qualified for the group stages of the 2013–14 UEFA Champions League following a 4-1 aggregate victory against PSV Eindhoven. After being drawn into the same group as Barcelona, Celtic and Ajax, Milan qualified second in their group, before being knocked out by Spanish-side Atlético Madrid 5–1 on aggregate at the round of 16 stage.

=== 2014–15 (10th in Serie A) ===
Milan hoped to turn around this run of bad fortune in the 2014–15 campaign under new boss Filippo Inzaghi. Convincing wins over Lazio (3–1) and Parma (5–4) at the beginning of the season seemed to display a change in performance, as Milan sat top of Serie A heading into October 2014. However, a deterioration in morale and what many had blamed on a lack of key signings doomed Milan to a tenth-placed finish. Club legend Inzaghi was subsequently sacked as head coach.

=== 2015–16 (7th in Serie A) ===
A raft of change came prior to the 2015–16 campaign. Siniša Mihajlović was recruited as head coach after he guided Sampdoria to a seventh-place finish the previous season. Club president Silvio Berlusconi splashed cash in order to bring a raft of talent into the club, including the signings of prolific Sevilla and Colombian international forward Carlos Bacca and 20-year-old Italian starlet Alessio Romagnoli from Roma for €30 million each; Genoa midfielder Andrea Bertolacci was also added for €20 million.

The club went on a ten-game unbeaten run in December to February, a period in which the club peaked at fifth place in Serie A and which included a 2–0 win over Fiorentina and a 3–0 victory over Inter in the Derby della Madonnina. The Rossoneri also reached the final of the season's Coppa Italia, defeating third-tier giant-killers Alessandria in the semi-finals.

A string of embarrassing results, such as a 3–3 draw at home with lowly Frosinone (in which they had to fight back from 3–1 down) and failure to overcome relegation-threatened Hellas Verona, saw the sacking of Mihajlović as coach and the appointment of Cristian Brocchi for the remainder of the season.

Unfortunately, this was not enough as Milan would see themselves leapfrogged by Sassuolo during the penultimate round of Serie A matches and finished in seventh, just outside the European spots. Hope remained, however, as defeating Juventus in the Coppa Italia final on 21 May would see them qualify for the Europa League. Milan ultimately lost the match 1–0 after extra time thanks to a late Álvaro Morata strike.

=== 2016–17 (6th in Serie A) ===
At the beginning of the season, Vincenzo Montella was hired as the new manager. Montella managed to win the 2016 Supercoppa Italiana which was Milan's first trophy in 5 years as well as taking the club back to Europe after 3 years.

=== 2017–18 (6th in Serie A, Eliminated Round of 16 in Europa League) ===
On 27 November 2017, Vincenzo Montella was sacked by Milan. Subsequently, they appointed Gattuso as the head coach of the first team, who left the position as the coach of A.C. Milan Primavera. Gennaro Gattuso recorded his first win as A.C. Milan head coach with a 2–1 home win over Bologna in Serie A on 10 December 2017.

Milan did not do impressively in the first half of the season, but with Gattuso they went on a 10-match unbeaten league run from Matchday 19 to Matchday 29, winning seven matches and drawing three. Thanks to Gattuso's management, Milan managed a 6th-place finish and were runners-up in the Coppa Italia, as well as reaching the Round of 16 in the Europa League (where they lost 5–1 on aggregate against Arsenal).

Milan qualified for the 2018–19 UEFA Europa League group stage as the sixth-placed team of the 2017–18 Serie A, but were originally banned by UEFA from European competition due to violations of Financial Fair Play regulations for failure to break-even. In July 2018, Li's investment vehicle Rossoneri Champion Inv. Lux. was removed as the shareholder of Rossoneri Sport Inv. Lux., the direct parent company of the club. On 10 July 2018, Li failed to keep up with his loan repayment plan, neglecting to deposit a €32-million installment on time in order to refinance the €303-million loan debt owed to the American hedge fund. As a result, ownership of the club was officially transferred to Elliott Management Corporation. Milan appealed to the Court of Arbitration for Sport, and the ban was overturned on 20 July 2018. On 28 June 2019, Milan was excluded from the Europa League for violating Financial Fair Play regulations for the years 2014–2017 and 2015–2018.

=== 2018-19 (5th in Serie A. Eliminated in Group Stage) ===
The first season under Elliot for Milan began as a season of change for the team with new club president Paolo Scaroni. As well as with the arrival of new players such as Samu Castillejo, Gonzalo Higuaìn (on loan), Tiémoué Bakayoko (on loan), Mattia Caldara and 2010 FIFA World Cup winner Pepe Reina among others and departure of players such as Leonardo Bonucci, Carlos Bacca, Manuel Locatelli (loaned out, later permanently purchased by Sassuolo) and André Silva (loaned out). In the pre-season, Milan had a combined record of 4 wins, 2 losses and 1 draw from friendlies, the International Champions Cup and the Trofeo Santiago Bernabéu. In the first half of the regular season, the team had a relatively positive period of 8 wins, 7 draws and 4 losses and placing 5th in the Serie A at the midpoint of the season (matchday 19).

However, at the midpoint of the season team management decided to make roster changes to attempt to reach the team's end-of-season goal to make the UEFA Champions League for 2019–2020. The winter of 2019 saw the arrivals of promising players such as Lucas Paquetá and Krzysztof Piątek, along with the departure of Gonzalo Higuaín. The changes proved successful as Milan experienced an incredible run of form from matchday 19 to 27, where they had 7 wins and 2 draws, placing 3rd in Serie A after matchday 27 concluded. However Milan experienced a drop in from between matchdays 28 to 34 where they had a record of 4 losses, 2 draws and only 1 win. However, from matches 35 to 38 the team won their last four of the season. However it was not enough and the team failed to make the Champions League again finishing in 5th. The team's failure, along with being ineligible to play in the 2019–20 UEFA Europa League due to needing to serve their penalty from UEFA, as well as losing to Lazio in the Coppa Italia semifinals, saw manager Gennaro Gattuso resign after the season's end.

=== 2019-20 (6th in Serie A) ===
After the resignation of Gattuso, Milan signed Marco Giampaolo, former manager of Sampdoria, to a contract to manage the team. The 2019–2020 season also saw the team celebrating their 120th anniversary of their establishment in 1899. The team during the summer saw numerous changes to the roster, especially with the arrival of promising players such as Franck Kessié, Théo Hernandez, Rafael Leão, Ismaël Bennacer and 2018 World Cup finalist Ante Rebić (on loan from Eintracht Frankfurt). It also saw the departures of Ignazio Abate, Riccardo Montolivo, Patrick Cutrone and Tiémoué Bakayoko. While many analysts and team supporters showed excitement for the new season and players, the team's preseason record was mediocre in both friendlies and in the International Champions Cup, having a record of only 1 win, 3 draws and 2 losses. The start of the regular season was mediocre, which saw a first matchday humiliation to Udinese Calcio 1–0 away from home. Following a string of poor performances against Inter Milan, Fiorentina and Torino F.C. and a last-minute victory against Genoa C.F.C. where the game in general was mediocre for Milan, Giampaolo was sacked from his managerial position and was replaced by former S.S. Lazio and Inter manager Stefano Pioli.

The first few months under Pioli's management was both a period of some praise and some criticism for the team and certain players. Pioli's job was near-constantly under pressure from upper management and fans. The lowest point was a 5-0 embarrassment at the hands of Atalanta on matchday 17, and at season's midpoint Milan sat 10th in Serie A. The winter of 2020 saw changes, the arrivals of Alexis Saelemaekers, Simon Kjær and the return of Zlatan Ibrahimović (Ibrahimović played on Milan from 2010 to 2012), as well as the departures of Lucas Paquetá, Ricardo Rodriguez, Pepe Reina and Suso. The team's form did slightly recover with these changes until the Serie A season was halted after matchday 26 due to the COVID-19 pandemic in Italy and orders by Prime Minister Giuseppe Conte for all sports to stop across Italy temporarily.

In June 2020, three and a half months after halting, the Serie A and Coppa Italia were given permission to continue with no spectators in stadiums. Milan's first game after the halt saw them draw to Juventus and be once again eliminated in the Coppa Italia semifinals (both teams played the first leg of the semifinal in February 2020, where it also ended a draw at San Siro). Milan's first match back in Serie A saw them thrash U.S. Lecce 4–1 away from home. From this victory, Milan's fortunes excelled and became one of the in-form teams in Serie A and in all of Europe. The team went on to go undefeated for the remainder of the season, which included famed victories against S.S. Lazio and Juventus. The team finished 6th in Serie A for the season, qualifying for the 2020–21 UEFA Europa League qualifying phase and play-off round.

== 2020s ==
=== 2020–21 (2nd in Serie A, Champions League return) ===
Entering the first full season under Stefano Pioli, and after their stellar finish to the previous 2019-20 Serie A season, the team entered the new season with relatively high expectations particularly to finish in the league's top four teams and qualify for the 2021–22 UEFA Champions League for the following season. The summer transfer window leading up to the season saw the arrivals of Pierre Kalulu, Ciprian Tătărușanu, Brahim Díaz (on loan from Real Madrid), Sandro Tonali (on loan from Brescia) and Diogo Dalot (on loan from Manchester United). Players who departed included Lucas Biglia, Giacomo Bonaventura and Lucas Paquetá. The team had a largely short preseason with most preseason matches being played against teams from Serie B and Serie C with all but one preseason match being played at the team's training ground at Milanello (the one match not at Milanello was against Monza and was played at the San Siro).

The team began the new season largely continuing their momentum they finished off the previous season with and even building on it more. Milan in the first weeks and months of the season saw numerous victories, including notable ones such as a 2–1 home victory against city rivals Inter in October, a 3–1 away victory against Napoli and a 2–0 home victory against Fiorentina in November and a 3–2 home victory against Lazio in December. In fact, the team went unbeaten all the way until a home defeat against Juventus in January, having a record of eleven wins and four draws until that January defeat. Meanwhile, the team qualified for the 2020–21 UEFA Europa League via two victories in the qualification rounds, one of which was against Norwegian side Bodø-Glimt which saw Milan purchase Bodø-Glimt player Jens Petter Hauge shortly after the match after Hague's performance against the Rossoneri impressed the team's upper management, and a 9-8 penalty victory in a playoff round match against Rio Ave. The team finished first in their group in the group stage winning four matches, drawing one and losing one (the loss was a 3–0 home loss against Lille, which made history as being the largest loss for Milan in its entire European competitive history in all European competitions it has been involved in). Milan went on to defeat Red Star Belgrade 3–3 on aggregate (Milan won via the away goals rule) with two mediocre performances in the Round of 32 which did cause controversy before they were eliminated from the competition in the Round of 16 by Manchester United with a 2-1 aggregate score.

Following their first Serie A defeat in January against Juventus, the team's form stagnated with victories against mostly squads on the bottom half of the Serie A table with victories against teams such as Torino and Crotone and losses against squads that Milan were competing with for the European spots on the table such as Atalanta and Inter. The team also saw an embarrassing 2–0 away defeat against Spezia but also a decent away 2–1 victory against Roma. The stagnate winter and later early spring form saw the arrivals of Mario Mandžukić, Fikayo Tomori (on loan from Chelsea), and Soualiho Meïté (on loan from Torino). Mateo Musacchio, Léo Duarte, and Andrea Conti departed during the winter transfer window (Duarte and Conti were loaned out, Musacchio was a permanent transfer). The team's fortunes in the 2020-21 Coppa Italia were mediocre, winning 5–4 on penalties in the Round of 16 against Torino but being eliminated in the quarter-finals against rivals Inter after a 2–1 defeat.

The team's form remained stagnant until the final five matches of the Serie A season, where the team made a successful final push to qualify for the next season's Champions League with impressive victories against Benevento (2-0), Juventus (3-0), and Torino (7-0). These were followed by a 0–0 home draw against Cagliari on the second last match of the season, and the team concluded the season with a 2–0 away victory against Atalanta. The victory against Atalanta secured a second-place finish for the team in Serie A with 79 points, their highest league finish since the 2011–12 Serie A when the team finished also in second place, and it also secured the team qualification to the 2021–22 UEFA Champions League, which would be their first time in the tournament since the 2013–14 UEFA Champions League.

=== 2021–22 (Scudetto Title Triumph) ===
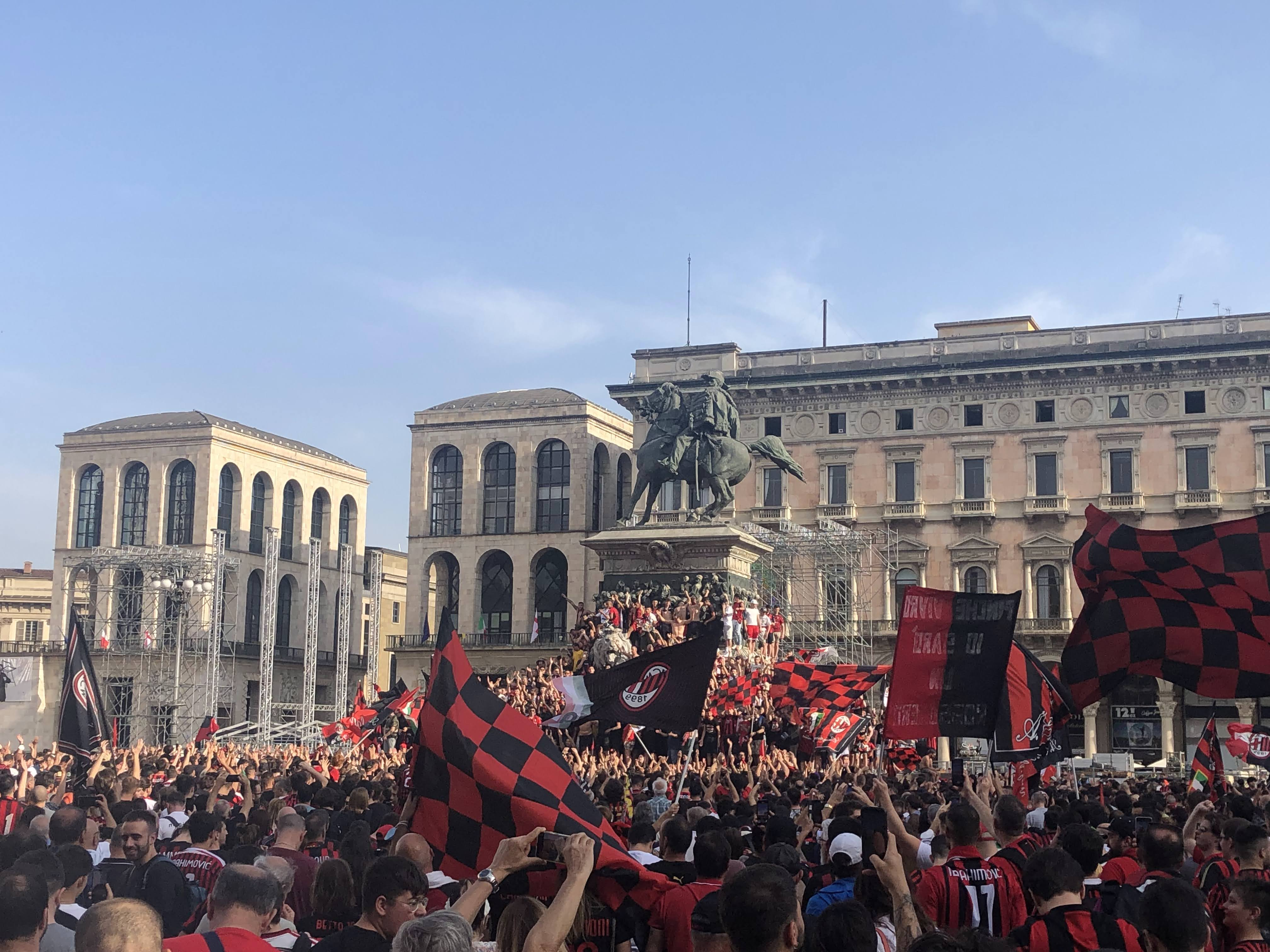
Rossoneri fans celebrating their 2021–22 Serie A win in Piazza del Duomo, Milan

After the departure of Calhanoglu and Donnarumma, Milan brought in the likes of Giroud, Mike Maignan and Messias. Milan started the campaign firmly, having won 10 matches of the first 11, and managed to snatch the leading spot from Napoli in March 2022 after a 1–0 victory against the latter. Milan went on to win the last 6 games of the season and was crowned with the League title on 22 May. In their first Scudetto since 2011, Milan managed to collect 86 points, their best tally since the 2005-2006 season, and conceded only 31 goals, the fewest in the league alongside Napoli.
