= Gadda =

Gadda is a surname. Notable people with the surname include:

- Carlo Emilio Gadda (1893–1973), Italian writer and poet
- Massimo Gadda (born 1963), Italian football coach and former player
