= Minoia =

Minoia is an Italian surname. Notable people with the surname include:

- Alberto Minoia (born 1960), Italian footballer
- Ferdinando Minoia (1884–1940), Italian racing driver
