= Giuseppe Greco (footballer, born 1958) =

Italian footballer

Personal information
- Full name: Giuseppe Greco
- Date of birth: 19 March 1958 (age 68)
- Place of birth: Lecce, Italy
- Height: 1.73 m (5 ft 8 in)
- Position: Midfielder

Youth career
- 1972–1973: Lecce
- 1973–1976: Torino

Senior career*
Years	Team	Apps	(Gls)
1976–1977	Turris	35	(9)
1977–1978	Ascoli	26	(2)
1979–1980	Torino	34	(6)
1980–1981	Lazio	34	(7)
1981–1988	Ascoli	141	(20)
1984–1985	→ Bologna (loan)	34	(4)
1985–1986	→ Matino (loan)	27	(12)
1988–1989	Potenza	25	(3)
1989–1990	Brindisi	21	(6)

International career
1977	Italy U20		
1979	Italy U21	3	(0)
- * Club domestic league appearances and goals

Giuseppe Greco (born 19 March 1958 in Lecce, Italy) is an Italian former footballer who played as an attacking midfielder. He played for Torino and Lazio but is best known for his career with Ascoli.

He is Ascoli's leading top-flight scorer, and was the team's joint leading scorer in the 1982–83 season along with Walter De Vecchi, with 7 goals.
