= Cesano Boscone =

- Comune
- Comune di Cesano Boscone
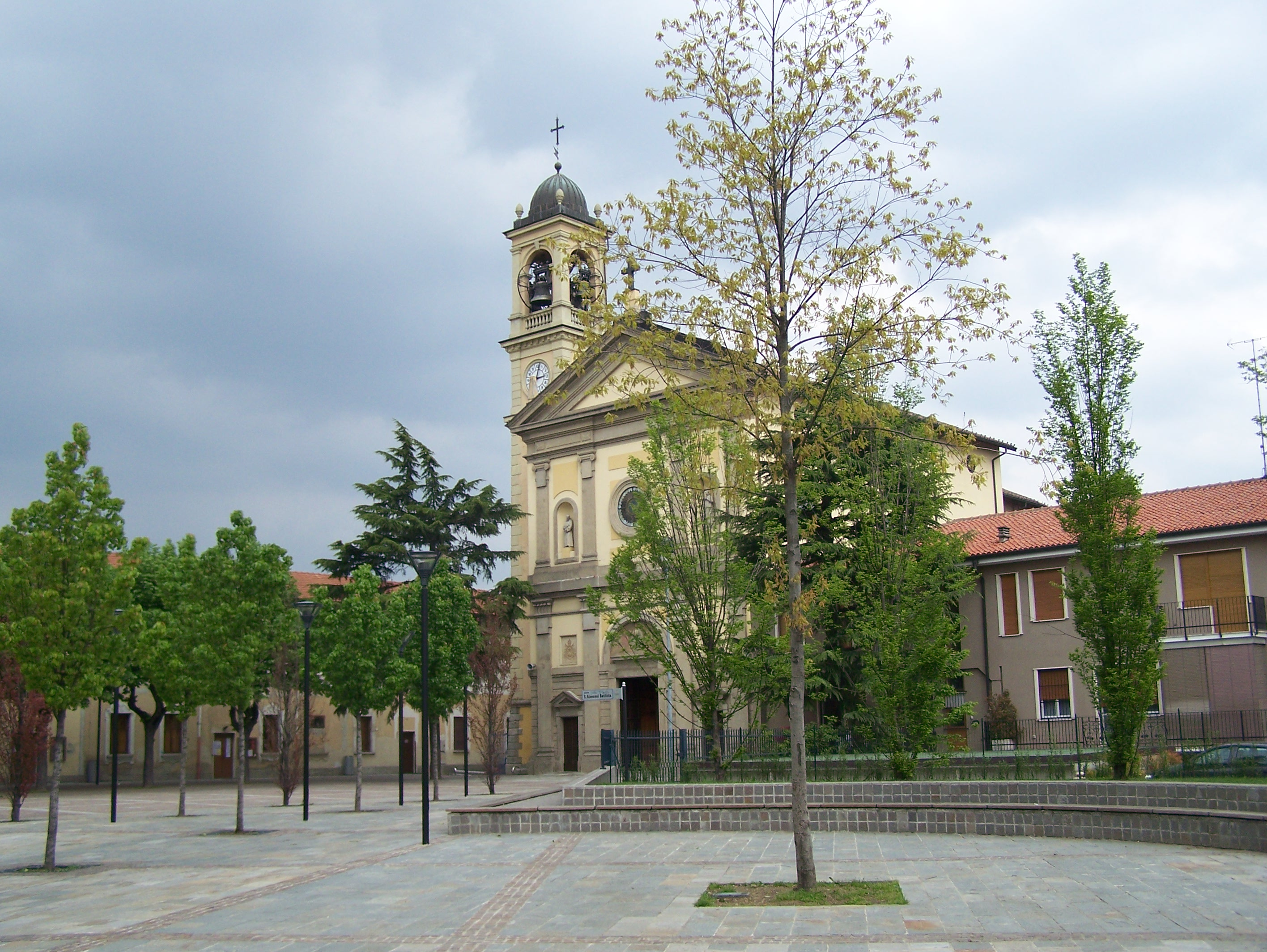

- Location within Italy Location within Lombardy
- Coordinates: 45°27′N 9°6′E
- Country: Italy
- Region: Lombardy
- Metropolitan city: Milan (MI)

Government
  - Mayor: Alfredo Simone Negri

Area
  - Total: 3.94 km^{2} (1.52 sq mi)
- Elevation: 119 m (390 ft)

Population (30 September 2015)
  - Total: 23,568
  - Density: 5,980/km^{2} (15,500/sq mi)
- Demonym: Cesanesi
- Time zone: UTC+1 (CET)
  - Summer (DST): UTC+2 (CEST)
- Postal code: 20090
- Dialing code: 02
- Patron saint: St. John the Baptist
- Saint day: June 24
- Website: Official website

Cesano Boscone (Lombard: Cesan [tʃeˈzãː]) is a comune (municipality) in the Metropolitan City of Milan in the Italian region Lombardy, located about 6 kilometres (4 mi) southwest of Milan.

Cesano Boscone borders the following municipalities: Milan, Corsico, Trezzano sul Naviglio. It is served by Cesano Boscone railway station.

== Main sights ==
- Church of St. John the Baptist, traditionally founded by the Lombard queen Theodolinda in 613, after her conversion to Christianity.

== Notable people ==
- Francesco Navazzotti (born 1954), retired professional footballer
