= Nicola Colombo =

Italian businessman (1968–2026)

- Born: 10 May 1968; Monza, Italy
- Died: 8 May 2026 (aged 57); Monza, Italy
- Occupation: Businessman
- Employer: CO.GE.FIN.
- Known for: President of Monza
- Parent: Felice Colombo
- Website: official website

Nicola Colombo (10 May 1968 – 8 May 2026) was an Italian businessman, who was chairman of Monza from 2015 to 2018.

Colombo died on 8 May 2026, at the age of 57, two days shy of his 58th birthday. He was the son of the past owner of AC Milan, Felice Colombo.
