= Francesco Navazzotti =

Italian footballer

Personal information
- Date of birth: September 28, 1954 (age 72)
- Place of birth: Cesano Boscone, Italy
- Height: 1.84 m (6 ft 1/2 in)
- Position: Goalkeeper

Senior career*
Years	Team	Apps	(Gls)
1974–1975	Milan	0	(0)
1975–1976	Clodiasottomarina	17	(0)
1976–1977	Lecco	28	(0)
1977–1978	Milan	0	(0)
1978–1979	Lecco	16	(0)
1979–1980	Milan	1	(0)
1980–1981	Reggina	34	(0)
1981–1982	Monza	4	(0)
1982–1983	Nocerina	31	(0)
1983–1984	empoli	0	(0)
- * Club domestic league appearances and goals

Francesco Navazzotti (born September 28, 1954, in Cesano Boscone) is a retired Italian professional football player. He recently worked as a goalkeepers' coach for one of the youth teams of A.C. Milan, and in 2017, has been working with Juventus youth academy.

He played 1 game in the Serie A for A.C. Milan in the 1979/80 season.

== See also ==
- Football in Italy
- List of football clubs in Italy
