= Maurizio Venturi =

Italian footballer and manager

Personal information
- Date of birth: October 2, 1957 (age 69)
- Place of birth: Brescia, Italy
- Height: 1.75 m (5 ft 9 in)
- Position: Defender

Senior career*
Years	Team	Apps	(Gls)
1976–1981	Brescia	69	(1)
1977–1978	→ Bolzano (loan)	35	(1)
1981–1982	Milan	13	(0)
1982–1984	Palermo	62	(1)
1984–1987	Cagliari	93	(3)

Managerial career
- Genoa (youth)
- * Club domestic league appearances and goals

Maurizio Venturi (born October 2, 1957, in Brescia) is an Italian former footballer who played as a defender. He played for two seasons (43 games without scoring) in Serie A for Brescia and A.C. Milan, and made a further 229 appearances in the Italian professional leagues.
