= Fabio Valente =

Italian footballer

Personal information
- Full name: Fabio Fabrizio Valente
- Date of birth: March 26, 1964 (age 62)
- Place of birth: Genoa, Italy
- Position: Striker

Senior career*
Years	Team	Apps	(Gls)
1981–1983	Milan	1	(0)
1982–1983	→ Sant'Angelo (loan)	23	(1)
1983–1984	Casale	22	(2)
- * Club domestic league appearances and goals

Fabio Fabrizio Valente (born March 26, 1964, in Genoa) is an Italian former professional footballer who made 46 appearances in the Italian professional leagues, including one game in Serie A for A.C. Milan in the 1981–82 season.

== See also ==
- Football in Italy
- List of football clubs in Italy
