= Dario Donà =

Italian footballer (born 1961)

Personal information
- Date of birth: September 17, 1961 (age 65)
- Place of birth: Italy
- Position: Midfielder

Senior career*
Years	Team	Apps	(Gls)
1979–1980	Treviso	31	(0)
1980–1981	Varese	16	(0)
1981	Milan	0	(0)
1981–1983	Vicenza	55	(6)
1983–1984	Bologna	34	(5)
1984–1985	Verona	12	(0)
1985–1986	Catanzaro	23	(0)
1986–1987	Reggiana	21	(1)
1987–1990	Ancona	71	(2)
- Giorgione
- * Club domestic league appearances and goals

Dario Donà (born 17 September 1961) is an Italian former footballer.

== Early life ==
He grew up in Treviso, Italy. He has four siblings.

== Career ==
In 1979, he signed for Italian side Treviso. In 1980, he signed for Italian side Varese. In 1981, he signed for Italian Serie A side Milan. In 1981, he signed for Italian side Vicenza. In 1983, he signed for Italian side Bologna. In 1984, he signed for Italian Serie A side Verona. He helped the club win the league. In 1985, he signed for Italian side Catanzaro. In 1986, he signed for Italian side Reggiana. In 1987, he signed for Italian side Ancona. After that, he signed for Italian side Giorgione.

== Personal life ==
He has been married. He has two daughters.
