= Antonino Trapani =

Italian association football player (born 1952)

Personal information
- Date of birth: 29 May 1952 (age 74)
- Place of birth: Palermo, Italy
- Height: 1.84 m (6 ft 1/2 in)
- Position: Goalkeeper

Senior career*
Years	Team	Apps	(Gls)
1972–1974	Marsala	54	(0)
1974–1979	Palermo	119	(0)
1979–1980	Catanzaro	6	(0)
1980–1981	Varese	0	(0)
- * Club domestic league appearances and goals

Antonino Trapani (born 29 May 1952) is a retired Italian professional football player who played as a goalkeeper.
