= Livio Pin =

Italian footballer

Personal information
- Full name: Livio Pin
- Date of birth: 23 January 1953 (age 73)
- Place of birth: Cappella Maggiore, Italy
- Height: 5 ft 5 in (1.65 m)
- Position: Midfielder

Youth career
- Perugia

Senior career*
Years	Team	Apps	(Gls)
1970–1979	Perugia		
1977–1979	→Napoli (loan)	45	(5)
1979–1982	Udinese		
1982–1985	Bologna	51	(5)
1985–1986	Żurrieq		
- * Club domestic league appearances and goals as of February 13, 2010

Livio Pin (born January 23, 1953, in Cappella Maggiore, Italy) was a professional footballer who during his career played for Perugia, Napoli, Udinese, Bologna and Żurrieq, throughout his career he played as a midfielder.
