= Mauro Amenta =

Italian footballer (born 1953)

Personal information
- Date of birth: 23 October 1953 (age 73)
- Place of birth: Orbetello, Italy
- Height: 1.74 m (5 ft 8 1/2 in)
- Position: Midfielder

Senior career*
Years	Team	Apps	(Gls)
1970–1972	Civitavecchia	35	(2)
1972–1973	Genoa	0	(0)
1973–1974	Pisa	23	(4)
1974–1978	Perugia	77	(7)
1978–1979	Fiorentina	23	(4)
1979–1981	Roma	16	(1)
1981–1982	Palermo	0	(0)
1982–1983	Pescara	19	(4)
1983–1987	Perugia	75	(9)
- * Club domestic league appearances and goals

Mauro Amenta (born 23 October 1953 in Orbetello) is an Italian former footballer who played as a midfielder. He played for six seasons (101 games, 12 goals) in Serie A for Perugia, Fiorentina and Roma.

== Honours ==
Roma

- Coppa Italia winner: 1979–80, 1980–81.
