= Massimo Gadda =

Italian footballer and manager

Personal information
- Date of birth: 16 September 1963 (age 63)
- Place of birth: Legnano, Italy
- Height: 1.70 m (5 ft 7 in)
- Position: Midfielder

Team information
- Current team: Ravenna (head coach)

Senior career*
| Years | Team | Apps | (Gls) |
| 1981–1985 | Milan | 7 | (1) |
| 1983–1984 | → Reggiana (loan) | 31 | (2) |
| 1984–1985 | → Reggiana (loan) | 28 | (0) |
| 1985–1986 | Livorno | 32 | (1) |
| 1986–1994 | Ancona | 249 | (4) |
| 1994–1997 | Ravenna | 91 | (6) |
| 1997–1998 | Cesena | 45 | (2) |
| 1998–2000 | SPAL | 42 | (0) |
| 2000–2001 | Fano | 28 | (2) |

Managerial career
- 2001–2002: Baracca Lugo
- 2002–2003: Ravenna
- 2003–2004: Ravenna
- 2004–2007: Cesena (assistant)
- 2008–2009: Bellaria Igea
- 2009–2010: Giacomense
- 2012–2013: Fano
- 2013–2014: SPAL
- 2015–2017: Forlì
- 2017–2018: Imolese
- 2021–2022: Forlì
- 2022–2024: Ravenna
- 2024–2025: Ancona
- * Club domestic league appearances and goals

Massimo Gadda (born 16 September 1963) is an Italian professional football coach and a former player.

== Playing career ==
He played for 2 seasons (21 games, no goals) in the Serie A for Milan and Ancona.

== Coaching career ==
During his time as an assistant manager with Cesena, he formally served as a bench boss for a period of time due to disqualification of the real manager, Fabrizio Castori.

On 25 October 2021, he returned to Forlì. He was however sacked on 27 January 2022.

On 7 November 2022, Gadda was hired as head coach of Ravenna for a third time in his career.

== Honours ==
- Mitropa Cup winner: 1981–82.
