= Stefano Chiodi =

Italian footballer (1956–2009)

Personal information
- Full name: Stefano Chiodi
- Date of birth: 26 December 1956
- Place of birth: Bentivoglio, Italy
- Date of death: 4 November 2009 (aged 52)
- Place of death: Bologna, Italy
- Height: 1.78 m (5 ft 10 in)
- Position: Winger

Youth career
- Bologna

Senior career*
Years	Team	Apps	(Gls)
1974–1978	Bologna	72	(18)
1974–1975	→ Teramo (loan)	29	(8)
1978–1980	A.C. Milan	50	(14)
1980–1981	Lazio	28	(6)
1981–1982	Bologna	15	(1)
1982–1983	Lazio	10	(0)
1983–1984	Prato	30	(10)

International career
1977–1978	Italy U-21	3	(2)
- * Club domestic league appearances and goals

Stefano Chiodi (26 December 1956 – 4 November 2009) was an Italian professional footballer who played as a winger.

== Honours ==
=== Club ===
A.C. Milan

- Serie A: 1978–79
