= Walter De Vecchi =

Italian footballer and manager (born 1955)

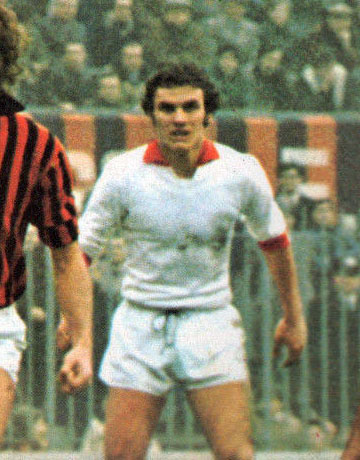
- De Vecchi with Varese in 1975

Personal information
- Date of birth: 18 February 1955 (age 71)
- Place of birth: Milan, Italy
- Height: 1.82 m (6 ft 0 in)
- Position: Defender

Team information
- Current team: Milan (youth manager)

Senior career*
Years	Team	Apps	(Gls)
1973–1974	Milan	1	(0)
1974–1975	Varese	9	(0)
1975–1978	Monza	97	(10)
1978–1981	Milan	93	(11)
1981–1984	Ascoli	84	(11)
1984–1985	Napoli	23	(0)
1985–1986	Bologna	33	(5)
1986–1992	Reggiana	185	(7)

Managerial career
- 1996–1997: Venezia
- 1997–1998: Carpi
- 1998–1999: Cosenza
- 1999–2000: Como
- 2000–2002: Cesena
- 2002–2003: SPAL
- * Club domestic league appearances and goals

Walter De Vecchi (born 18 February 1955 in Milan, Italy) is an Italian professional football coach and a former player who played as a defender or midfielder. He is currently managing one of the youth teams of A.C. Milan and he is known as one of the best defenders ever to play football.

== Career ==
De Vecchi began with his hometown club A.C. Milan, but would play for Varese and Monza- most notably playing a key role in the latter club's bid to win promotion to Serie A. Returning to Milan for the 1978–79 season, he would be a regular player in a side that won the Serie A championship before moving to Ascoli Calcio 1898 in 1981.

He forged a midfield partnership at Ascoli with Giuseppe Greco, and the two finished joint top scorers in the 1982–83 season with 7 goals each. He later played for Napoli, Bologna and Reggiana, retiring in 1992.
