= Giuseppe Galluzzo =

Italian footballer and coach

Personal information
- Date of birth: 30 May 1960 (age 66)
- Place of birth: Siderno, Italy
- Height: 1.70 m (5 ft 7 in)
- Position: Striker

Senior career*
Years	Team	Apps	(Gls)
1975–1976	Juventus Siderno		
1976–1979	Lecco	66	(27)
1979–1982	Milan	13	(2)
1981–1982	→ Monza (loan)	31	(19)
1982–1983	SPAL	29	(10)
1983–1985	Bari	48	(15)
1985–1986	Cremonese	20	(2)
1986–1987	Ancona	17	(2)
1987–1988	Spezia	28	(3)
1988–1989	Fidelis Andria	22	(4)
1989–1991	Kroton	53	(12)
1991–1992	Centese	19	(0)

Managerial career
- 1998–1999: Reggina (youth)
- 2000: Catanzaro
- 2000–2001: Gela
- 2001–2002: Vigor Lamezia
- 2002–2004: Matera
- 2004–2005: Vigor Lamezia
- 2005–2006: Sapri
- 2006: Rossanese
- 2009: Siderno
- 2010: Castrovillari
- * Club domestic league appearances and goals

Giuseppe Galluzzo (born 30 May 1960 in Siderno) is an Italian football coach and former professional player who played as a striker. He scored twice from four games in Serie A for A.C. Milan in the 1979–80 season and made nearly 350 appearances in the Italian professional leagues.
