= Felice Colombo =

Italian businessman and football chairman

- Born: 24 August 1937 (age 88); Bellusco, Italy
- Employer: Fratelli Colombo s.n.c. - CO.GE.FIN.
- Known for: Chairman of A.C. Milan (1977–1980)
- Children: Nicola Colombo

Felice Colombo (born 24 August 1937) is an Italian businessman and chairman of A.C. Milan from 1977 to 1980.

His son Nicola Colombo was chairman at Monza from 2015 to 2018.
