= Alberto Minoia =

Italian footballer (born 1960)

Personal information
- Date of birth: 6 May 1960 (age 66)
- Place of birth: Varedo, Italy
- Height: 1.80 m (5 ft 11 in)
- Position: Defender

Youth career
- Milan

Senior career*
Years	Team	Apps	(Gls)
1978–1982	Milan	40	(1)
1982–1983	Sambenedettese	27	(2)
1983–1988	Arezzo	159	(4)
1988–1989	Taranto	27	(2)
1989–1991	Montevarchi	52	(0)
- * Club domestic league appearances and goals

Alberto Minoia (born 6 May 1960) is a retired Italian professional football player.

He played 3 seasons (18 games, 1 goal) in the Serie A for A.C. Milan, scoring his first (and last) Serie A goal in his second game for the team.

In 1979, he was called up for the Italy national under-21 football team, but did not play in that game.

== Honours ==
- Serie A champion: 1978/79.
- Mitropa Cup winner: 1981/82.
