= Roberto Antonelli =

Italian footballer and manager

Personal information
- Full name: Roberto Antonelli
- Date of birth: 29 May 1953 (age 73)
- Place of birth: Morbegno, Italy
- Height: 1.74 m (5 ft 8 1/2 in)
- Positions: Forward; midfielder

Youth career
- Monza

Senior career*
Years	Team	Apps	(Gls)
1972–1977	Monza	88	(15)
1975–1976	→ Vicenza (loan)	16	(1)
1977–1982	AC Milan	117	(29)
1982–1985	Genoa	49	(9)
1984–1985	→ Roma (loan)	5	(1)
1985–1986	Monza	22	(4)
Total		297	(59)

Managerial career
- 1990–1993: Caratese
- 1993–1994: Casarano
- 1994–1995: Pro Sesto
- 1995–1996: Casarano
- 1996–1997: Novara
- 1999–2002: Monza
- 2002–2003: Seregno
- * Club domestic league appearances and goals

Roberto Antonelli (born 29 May 1953) is a former Italian football manager and player who played as a striker or as an attacking midfielder.

== Club career ==
A highly talented yet humble player, throughout his career, Antonelli played for Italian clubs Monza, Vicenza, AC Milan, Genoa, and Roma. He contributed to Milan's tenth league title victory during the 1978–79 Serie A season with 21 appearances and 5 goals; following Milan's relegation after their involvement in the Totonero 1980 match-fixing scandal, he remained with the club and played a decisive role in helping the team win the Serie B title in 1981 and earn promotion to Serie A, scoring 15 goals, and finishing the season as the top scorer in Serie B.

== Personal life ==
His son Luca Antonelli is a professional footballer, playing 108 games for Genoa as a left back. Throughout his career, Roberto earned the nickname Dustin, due to his resemblance to the actor Dustin Hoffman.

== Honours ==
AC Milan

- Serie A: 1978–79
- Serie B: 1980–81
- Mitropa Cup: 1981–82

Individual

- Serie B Top-scorer: 1980–81 (15 goals)
- AC Milan Hall of Fame
