= 1978–79 AC Perugia season =

Associazione Calcio Perugia
1978–79 season
- Chairman: Franco D'Attoma
- Manager: Ilario Castagner
- Stadium: Renato Curi
- Serie A: 2nd
- Coppa Italia: Quarter-finals
- Top goalscorer: League: Walter Speggiorin (9); All: Walter Speggiorin (11)
- Average home league attendance: 20 984
Home colours	Away colours	Third colours

During the 1978–79 season A.C. Perugia competed in Serie A and Coppa Italia. They completed the season unbeaten, but did not win the league title.

== Summary ==
A.C. Perugia was the first team during the round-robin era to go through the season undefeated, although due to their 19 drawn matches, they finished second in the league.

The campaign is remembered for Perugia’s undefeated season. The club completed the season without a loss, a first in top-level Italian football.

The phrase "Never loses, but does not win" has been used to describe Perugia's season, reflecting that their unbeaten record did not translate into the league title.

With just six games of the season remaining, the unlikely title challengers sat just two points behind leaders Milan and still had to host the Rossoneri after gaining a 1–1 draw away earlier in the campaign. A win could have ensured that Perugia put themselves in pole position in the run-in. However, the game finished 1–1, with Gianfranco Casarsa's spot kick cancelling out Stefano Chiodi's penalty for Milan minutes earlier. This result meant that the title was Milan's to lose.

Despite disappointing draws away to Catanzaro and Hellas Verona in the weeks that followed, Perugia were still in with a chance of final day success providing that Milan lost and Perugia picked up the win away to Bologna.

Although Salvatore Bagni's brace put the visitors ahead and Bologna rallied and fought back to a 2–2 draw. This result ended Perugia's title challenge, though they finished the season undefeated.

== Squad ==
Note: Flags indicate national team as defined under FIFA eligibility rules; some limited exceptions apply. Players may hold more than one non-FIFA nationality.

Pos.	Nation	Player
GK	ITA	Marcello Grassi
GK	ITA	Nello Malizia
GK	ITA	Franco Mancini
DF	ITA	Antonio Ceccarini
DF	ITA	Paolo Dall'Oro
DF	ITA	Mauro Della Martira
DF	ITA	Pierluigi Frosio (Captain)
DF	ITA	Michele Nappi
DF	ITA	Daniele Tacconi
DF	ITA	Luciano Zecchini

Pos.	Nation	Player
MF	ITA	Salvatore Bagni
MF	ITA	Cesare Butti
MF	ITA	Paolo Dal Fiume
MF	ITA	Mario Goretti
MF	ITA	Giorgio Redeghieri
MF	ITA	Franco Vannini
FW	ITA	Marco Cacciatori
FW	ITA	Gianfranco Casarsa
FW	ITA	Walter Speggiorin

=== Transfers ===
In
Pos.	Name	from	Type
DF	Mauro Della Martira	Fiorentina	
MF	Cesare Butti	Torino	
MF	Giorgio Redeghieri	Parma	
FW	Marco Cacciatori	Carrarese	
FW	Gianfranco Casarsa	Fiorentina	

To
Pos.	Name	to	Type
DF	Antonio Matteoni	Parma	
MF	Mauro Amenta	Fiorentina	
MF	Guido Biondi	Lecce	
FW	Walter Novellino	A.C. Milan	
FW	Walter Sabatini	Palermo	
FW	Mario Scarpa	Parma	

== Competitions ==
=== Serie A ===
==== League table ====
Pos	Team	Pld	W	D	L	GF	GA	GD	Pts	Qualification or relegation
1	Milan (C)	30	17	10	3	46	19	+27	44	Qualification to European Cup
2	Perugia	30	11	19	0	34	16	+18	41	Qualification to UEFA Cup
3	Juventus	30	12	13	5	40	23	+17	37	Qualification to Cup Winners' Cup
4	Internazionale	30	10	16	4	38	24	+14	36	Qualification to UEFA Cup
5	Torino	30	11	14	5	35	23	+12	36	Qualification to UEFA Cup

Source: Panini
(C) Champions

==== Result by round ====
Round	1	2	3	4	5	6	7	8	9	10	11	12	13	14	15	16	17	18	19	20	21	22	23	24	25	26	27	28	29	30
Ground	H	A	H	A	H	A	H	A	H	A	A	H	H	A	H	A	H	A	H	A	H	A	H	A	H	H	A	A	H	A
Result	W	D	W	W	D	W	W	D	D	D	D	W	D	D	W	D	D	D	D	W	W	D	D	D	D	W	D	D	W	D
Position	1	2	1	1	2	1	1	1	1	1	2	2	2	2	2	2	2	2	2	2	2	2	2	2	2	2	2	2	2	2

Source: Competitive matches
A = Away; H = Home; W = Win; D = Draw; L = Loss; P = Postponed; = Leader, 1979–80 European Cup; = 1979–80 UEFA Cup

==== Matches ====
1 October 1978 1	Perugia	2–0	Lanerossi	Perugia
	Bagni 14'; Dal Fiume 88'	Report		Stadium: Stadio Renato Curi; Attendance: 16,000; Referee: Longhi

8 October 1978 2	Inter Milan	1–1	Perugia	Milan
	Pasinato 31'	Report	87' Cacciatori	Stadium: San Siro; Attendance: 45,000; Referee: Lattanzi

15 October 1978 3	Perugia	1–0	Fiorentina	Perugia
	Casarsa 57' (pen.)	Report		Stadium: Stadio Renato Curi; Attendance: 35000; Referee: Michelotti

22 October 1978 4	Juventus	1–2	Perugia	Turin
	Cuccureddu 65'	Report	16' Speggiorin; 77' Vannini	Stadium: Comunale; Attendance: 38,000; Referee: Barbaresco

29 October 1978 5	Perugia	0–0	Avellino	Perugia
		Report		Stadium: Stadio Renato Curi; Attendance: 20,000; Referee: Menegali

5 November 1978 6	Atalanta B.C.	0–2	Perugia	Bergamo
		Report	2', 6' Speggiorin	Stadium: Comunale; Referee: Agnolin

12 November 1978 7	Perugia	2–0	Ascoli	Perugia
	Speggiorin 5'; Dal Fiume 60'	Report		Stadium: Stadio Renato Curi; Referee: Ciulli

19 November 1978 8	Roma	0–0	Perugia	Rome
		Report		Stadium: Stadio Olimpico; Attendance: 65,000; Referee: Casarin

26 November 1978 9	Perugia	0–0	Torino	Perugia
		Report		Stadium: Stadio Renato Curi; Attendance: 26,000; Referee: Bergamo

3 December 1978 10	Milan	1–1	Perugia	Milan
	Antonelli 62'		3' Vannini	Stadium: San Siro; Attendance: 45 000; Referee: Longhi

10 December 1978 11	Napoli	1–1	Perugia	Naples
	Majo 55'	Report	62' Speggiorin	Stadium: San Paolo; Attendance: 60 000; Referee: Lattanzi

17 December 1978 12	Perugia	1–0	Catanzaro	Perugia
	Speggiorin 61'	Report		Stadium: Stadio Renato Curi; Referee: Lops

7 January 1979 13	Perugia	1–1	Hellas Verona	Perugia
	Frosio 54'	Report	88' Bergamaschi	Stadium: Stadio Renato Curi; Attendance: 15 000; Referee: Lanese

14 January 1979 14	Lazio	0–0	Perugia	Rome
		Report		Stadium: Stadio Olimpico; Attendance: 50 000; Referee: Michelotti

21 January 1979 15	Perugia	3–1	Bologna	Perugia
	Casarsa 25', 68'; Speggiorin 58'	Report	76' (pen.) Bordon	Stadium: Stadio Renato Curi; Attendance: 12 000; Referee: Lo Bello

28 January 1979 16	Lanerossi	1–1	Perugia	Vicenza
	Rossi 14'	Report	25' Bagni	Stadium: Stadio Romeo Menti; Referee: Benedetti

4 February 1979 17	Perugia	2–2	Inter Milan	Perugia
	Vannini 53'; Ceccarini 90'	Report	19' Altobelli; 36' Muraro	Stadium: Stadio Renato Curi; Referee: Longhi

11 February 1979 18	Fiorentina	1–1	Perugia	Florence
	Sella 9'	Report	21' Speggiorin	Stadium: Comunale; Attendance: 50 000; Referee: D'Elia

18 February 1979 19	Perugia	0–0	Juventus	Perugia
		Report		Stadium: Stadio Renato Curi; Attendance: 31 224; Referee: Menegali

4 March 1979 20	Avellino	0–1	Perugia	Avellino
		Report	82' Bagni	Stadium: Stadio Partenio; Attendance: 30 000; Referee: Agnolin

11 March 1979 21	Perugia	2–0	Atalanta	Perugia
	Osti 16' (o.g.); Bagni 30'	Report		Stadium: Stadio Renato Curi; Attendance: 21 000; Referee: Paparesta

18 March 1979 22	Ascoli	0–0	Perugia	Ascoli Piceno
		Report		Stadium: Stadio Cino e Lillo Del Duca; Attendance: 22 000; Referee: Lattanzi

25 March 1979 23	Perugia	1–1	Roma	Perugia
	Peccenini 22' (o.g.)	Report	90' Ugolotti	Stadium: Stadio Renato Curi; Referee: Barbaresco

1 April 1979 24	Torino	0–0	Perugia	Turin
		Report		Stadium: Stadio Comunale; Attendance: 37 000; Referee: Michelotti

8 April 1979 25	Perugia	1–1	Milan	Perugia
	Casarsa 17' (pen.)	Report	15' (pen.) Chiodi	Stadium: Stadio Renato Curi; Attendance: 30 000; Referee: Agnolin

14 April 1979 26	Perugia	2–0	Napoli	Perugia
	Speggiorin 15'; Dal Fiume 64'	Report		Stadium: Stadio Renato Curi; Referee: Casarin

22 April 1979 27	Catanzaro	1–1	Perugia	Catanzaro
	R. Rossi 60'	Report	2' Butti	Stadium: Comunale; Attendance: 15 000; Referee: Menegali

29 April 1979 28	Hellas Verona	1–1	Perugia	Verona
	Guidolin 81'	Report	47' (o.g.) Gentile	Stadium: Stadio Marcantonio Bentegodi; Referee: Lattanzi

6 May 1979 29	Perugia	2–0	Lazio	Perugia
	Bagni 15', 27'	Report		Stadium: Stadio Renato Curi; Attendance: 18 000; Referee: Milan

13 May 1979 30	Bologna	2–2	Perugia	Bologna
	Mastalli 40'; Bordon 49' (pen.)	Report	31', 34' Bagni	Stadium: Comunale; Attendance: 40 000; Referee: Casarin

=== Coppa Italia ===
==== Group phase ====
Pos	Team	Pld	W	D	L	GF	GA	GD	Pts
1	Perugia	4	2	2	0	7	1	+6	6
2	Avellino	4	1	3	0	3	2	+1	5
3	Udinese	4	1	2	1	3	2	+1	4
4	Pescara	4	1	2	1	3	3	0	4
5	Sambenedettese	4	0	1	3	1	9	−8	1

30 August 1978 2	Perugia	2–0	Pescara	Perugia
	Speggiorin 49'; Piacenti 70' (o.g.)	Report		Stadium: Stadio Renato Curi; Referee: Lanzetti

3 September 1978 3	Udinese	1–1	Perugia	Udine
	Vriz 83' (pen.)	Report	12' Vannini	Stadium: Stadio Friuli; Referee: Panzino

10 September 1978 4	Perugia	4–0	Sambenedettese	Perugia
	Casarsa 7', 50' (pen.); Goretti 26'; Speggiorin 57'	Report		Stadium: Stadio Renato Curi; Referee: Paparesta

17 September 1978 5	Avellino	0–0	Perugia	Avellino
		Report		Stadium: Stadio Partenio; Attendance: 25 000; Referee: Longhi

==== Quarterfinals ====
25 April 1979	Napoli	2–1	Perugia	Naples
	Tesser 81'; Filippi 88'	Report	54' Dal Fiume	Stadium: Stadio San Paolo; Referee: Benedetti

9 May 1979	Perugia	0–0	Napoli	Perugia
		Report		Stadium: Stadio Renato Curi; Referee: Bergamo

== Players statistics ==
No.	Pos	Nat	Player	Total		Serie A		Coppa	
No.	Pos	Nat	Player	Apps	Goals	Apps	Goals	Apps	Goals
	GK	(Italy) ITA	Malizia	30	-17	27+1	-15	2	-2
	DF	(Italy) ITA	Ceccarini	35	1	29	1	6	0
	DF	(Italy) ITA	Della Martira	35	0	29	0	6	0
	DF	(Italy) ITA	Frosio	28	1	24	1	4	0
	DF	(Italy) ITA	Nappi	25	0	21	0	4	0
	MF	(Italy) ITA	Dal Fiume	34	4	28	3	6	1
	MF	(Italy) ITA	Bagni	31	8	28	8	3	0
	MF	(Italy) ITA	Butti	30	1	26	1	4	0
	MF	(Italy) ITA	Redeghieri	28	0	20+3	0	5	0
	FW	(Italy) ITA	Casarsa	34	6	28	4	6	2
	FW	(Italy) ITA	Speggiorini	31	11	26	9	5	2
	GK	(Italy) ITA	Grassi	7	-2	3	-1	4	-1
	MF	(Italy) ITA	Vannini	21	4	17	3	4	1
	MF	(Italy) ITA	Goretti	18	1	9+3	0	6	1
	DF	(Italy) ITA	Zecchini	16	0	8+6	0	2	0
	FW	(Italy) ITA	Cacciatori	18	1	7+7	1	4	0
	DF	(Italy) ITA	Tacconi	4	0	0+3	0	1	0
	GK	(Italy) ITA	Mancini	0	0	0	0		
	DF	(Italy) ITA	Dall'Oro	2	0	0	0	2	0
	GK	(Italy) ITA	Balducci	0	0	0	0		
	GK	(Italy) ITA	Redomi	0	0	0	0		

- Source: http://calcio-seriea.net/presenze/1978/812/

== See also ==
- List of unbeaten football club seasons
