= 2025–26 AC Perugia Calcio season =

Football club season

AC Perugia Calcio
2025–26 season
- Manager: Vincenzo Cangelosi (until 20 September); Piero Braglia (from 21 September) Giovanni Tedesco (from 22 October)
- Stadium: Stadio Renato Curi
- Serie C Group B: 17th
- Coppa Italia Serie C: Second round

The 2025–26 season is the 121st in the history of AC Perugia Calcio and the club's third consecutive season in Serie C. In addition to the domestic league, Perugia competes in the Coppa Italia Serie C. The season began on 17 August 2025.

== Squad ==
=== Transfers In ===
Pos.	Player	Transferred from	Fee	Date	Source
DF	(Italy) Raul Morichelli	(Italy) Messina	Loan return	30 June 2025	
MF	(Italy) Giorgio Tumbarello	(Italy) Lucchese	Free	1 July 2025	
DF	(Sweden) Karlson Nwanege	(Italy) Hellas Verona U20	Loan	12 August 2025	
FW	(Italy) Roberto Ogunseye	(Italy) Cesena	Loan	27 August 2025	
FW	(Italy) Giacomo Manzari	(Italy) Bari	Loan	28 August 2025	
MF	(Finland) Dren Terrnava	(Italy) Parma U20	Loan	1 September 2025	
MF	(Lithuania) Linas Mėgelaitis	(Italy) Rimini	Free	4 September 2025	

=== Transfers Out ===
Pos.	Player	Transferred to	Fee	Date	Source
DF	(Switzerland) Daniel Leo	(Italy) Crotone	Loan return	30 June 2025	
DF	(Italy) Francesco Mezzoni	(Italy) Napoli	Loan return	30 June 2025	
FW	(Sweden) Peter Amoran	(Italy) Parma	Loan return	30 June 2025	
DF	(Italy) Raul Morichelli			1 July 2025	
MF	(Australia) Louis Agosti	(Italy) Dolomiti Bellunesi	Free	1 August 2025	
MF	(Lithuania) Adrian Lickūnas	(Italy) Cremonese U20	Loan	1 September 2025	

== Friendlies ==
18 July 2025	Inipendiente (Argentina)	2–1	Perugia	Ezeiza, Argentina
10:00 UTC−3	Mastrolorenzo 11'; Cruz 60+2'		Perugini 57'	Referee: Mathias Gimenez
Note: Two halves of 30 minutes each

23 July 2025	Deportivo Morón (Argentina)	2–0	Perugia	Morón, Argentina
15:30 UTC−3	Contreras 25'; Fergonzi 83'			Stadium: Estadio Nuevo Francisco Urbano; Referee: Julian Bianco

28 July 2025	Club Comunicaciones (Argentina)	0–1	Perugia	Ezeiza, Argentina
		Report	Torrasi 41'
Note: Two halves of 35 minutes each.

5 August 2025	Pontevecchio	0–7	Perugia	Ponte San Giovanni
18:00		Report		Stadium: stadio comunale “Degli Orari” Attendance: 700; Referee: Vitali

== Competitions ==
=== Overall record ===
Competition	First match	Last match	Starting round	Record							
Competition	First match	Last match	Starting round	Pld	W	D	L	GF	GA	GD	Win %
Serie C	22 August 2025	26 April 2026	Matchday 1	5	0	3	2	5	8	−3	0.00
Coppa Italia Serie C	17 August 2025		First round	1	0	1	0	0	0	+0	0.00
Total				6	0	4	2	5	8	−3	0.00

Last updated: 19 September 2025
Source: Competitions

=== Serie C ===
Group B

==== Results summary ====
Overall								Home						Away					
Pld	W	D	L	GF	GA	GD	Pts	W	D	L	GF	GA	GD	W	D	L	GF	GA	GD
5	0	3	2	5	8	−3	3	0	1	1	0	2	−2	0	2	1	5	6	−1

Last updated: 19 September 2025.

==== Results by round ====
Round	1	2	3	4	5	6
Ground	H	A	A	H	A	H
Result	D	D	D	L	L	
Position	11	13	14	17	17	

Updated to match(es) played on 19 September 2025. Source:
A = Away; H = Home; W = Win; D = Draw; L = Loss

==== Matches ====
The competition draw was held on 28 July 2025.

22 August 2025 1	Perugia	0–0	Guidonia Montecelio	Perugia
21:15 UTC+2			Bernardotto (penalty missed) 24'	Stadium: Stadio Renato Curi; Attendance: 4,096; Referee: Andrea Zoppi

30 August 2025 2	Bra	2–2	Perugia	Sestri Levante
18:00 UTC+2	Minaj 45+1'; Sganzerla (yellow card) 58' (yellow-red card) 90+8'; La Marca 67'		Nwanege (yellow card) 45' (yellow-red card) 51'; Giunti 48'; Ogunseye 90+12' (pen.)	Stadium: Stadio Giuseppe Sivori; Attendance: 350; Referee: Giuseppe Rispoli

6 September 2025 3	Gubbio	1–1	Perugia	Gubbio
15:00 UTC+2	Signorini 34'		Riccardi 3'	Stadium: Stadio Pietro Barbetti; Referee: Edoardo Manedo Mazzoni

14 September 2025 4	Perugia	0–2	Ascoli	Perugia
15:00 UTC+2			Gori 74' (pen.); Pagliai 86'	Stadium: Stadio Renato Curi; Attendance: 4,709; Referee: Stefano Striamo

19 September 2025 5	Ravenna	3–2	Perugia	Ravenna
20:30 UTC+2	Spini 44'; Donati 61'; Tenkorang 63'		Kanouté 6'; Matos 41'	Stadium: Stadio Bruno Benelli; Attendance: 4,552; Referee: Lucio Felice Angelillo

23 September 2025 6	Perugia	v	Sambenedettese	Perugia
20:45 UTC+2				Stadium: Stadio Renato Curi

=== Coppa Italia Serie C ===
17 August 2025 First round	Perugia	0–0 (5–4 p)	Pontedera	Perugia
18:00				Stadium: Stadio Renato Curi; Referee: Gerardo Simone Caruso

30 October 2025 Second round	Latina	v	Perugia
20:30 UTC+2
