= Nello Malizia =

Italian football player and manager

Personal information
- Full name: Nello Malizia
- Date of birth: 30 July 1950 (age 76)
- Place of birth: Montenero di Bisaccia, Italy
- Height: 1.80 m (5 ft 11 in)
- Position: Goalkeeper

Youth career
- 1968–1970: Maceratese

Senior career*
Years	Team	Apps	(Gls)
1970–1974	Maceratese	78	(0)
1974–1982	Perugia	133	(0)
1982–1983	Cagliari	26	(0)
1983–1984	Padova	32	(0)
1984–1988	Atalanta	7	(0)
1988–1989	Orceana	25	(0)
Total		301	(0)

Managerial career
- 1992–1993: Atalanta (assistant)
- 1993–2009: Atalanta (goalkeeping)
- 2011–2015: Aurora Seriate (goalkeeping)
- 2016–2019: Virtus Bergamo (goalkeeping)
- 2023–2024: Castel del Piano (goalkeeping)
- * Club domestic league appearances and goals

Nello Malizia (born 30 July 1950) is an Italian former professional footballer and manager who played as a goalkeeper.

He spent the defining period of his career with Perugia, serving as the starting goalkeeper during the legendary Perugia dei miracoli squad that finished the 1978–79 Serie A season unbeaten as runners-up.

== Playing career ==
=== Early career ===
Born in Montenero di Bisaccia, Malizia grew up in Potenza Picena and developed through the youth system of Maceratese, making nearly 80 appearances across Serie C and Serie D.

In October 1974, Malizia moved to Perugia in Serie B as a backup to Roberto Marconcini. In his debut season in Umbria, he made 10 league appearances as Perugia secured their historic first-ever promotion to Serie A after winning the 1974–75 Serie B title.

=== Perugia's "Miracle Team" and European debut ===
By the 1977–78 season, Malizia earned the starting goalkeeper role for Perugia. Despite competing for the position with Marcello Grassi, Malizia became a cornerstone of manager Ilario Castagner's defensive system during the 1978–79 Serie A campaign.

That season, Perugia made Italian football history by finishing second behind Milan without losing a single game (11 wins, 19 draws), conceding only 16 goals in 30 league matches. Malizia's performances in goal were instrumental to the unbeaten run. The following season, he represented Perugia in international competition during the 1979–80 UEFA Cup.

Malizia remained loyal to Perugia for eight seasons, continuing to guard the club's goal even after their relegation to Serie B in 1981, eventually accumulating 133 league appearances for the club before departing in 1982.

=== Later career ===
In 1982, Malizia returned to Serie A with Cagliari, playing 26 matches. He then joined Padova in Serie B for the 1983–84 season, before signing with Atalanta, where he spent four years as a reliable backup goalkeeper behind Ottorino Piotti. He concluded his active playing career in 1989 with Orceana Calcio in Serie C2.

Over his career, Malizia made 84 appearances in Serie A and 124 appearances in Serie B.

== Coaching career ==
After retiring as a player, Malizia embarked on a long career as a goalkeeping coach. In 1992, he joined the technical staff at Atalanta, serving as assistant coach and primary goalkeeping coach for 16 consecutive years until 2009.

He later served as goalkeeping coach for non-league and amateur clubs, including Aurora Seriate, Virtus Bergamo, and Umbrian side Castel del Piano.

== Honours ==
=== Player ===
Perugia

- Serie B: 1974–75
- Coppa d'Estate: 1978
- Serie A runner-up (unbeaten): 1978–79
