= 1997–98 Serie B =

Italian football league season

Serie B
- Season: 1997–98
- Promoted: Salernitana (1st title); Venezia; Cagliari; Perugia
- Relegated: Foggia; Ancona; Padova; Castel di Sangro
- Matches: 380
- Goals: 897 (2.36 per match)
- Top goalscorer: (Italy) Marco Di Vaio (21 goals)

Serie B 1997-98 team distribution

The Serie B 1997–98 was the sixty-sixth tournament of this competition played in Italy since its creation.

== Teams ==
Treviso, Monza, Fidelis Andria and Ancona had been promoted from Serie C, while Cagliari, Perugia, Hellas Verona and Reggiana had been relegated from Serie A.

=== Personnel and sponsoring ===
Team	Manager	Kit manufacturer	Shirt sponsor
Ancona	(Italy) Francesco Giorgini	Kappa	None
Cagliari	(Italy) Gian Piero Ventura	Biemme	Pecorino Sardo
Castel di Sangro	(Italy) Franco Selvaggi	Pienne	Soviet Jeans
Chievo Verona	(Italy) Silvio Baldini	Biemme	Paluani
Fidelis Andria	(Italy) Giuseppe Papadopulo	Biemme	Banca Popolare Andriese
Foggia	(Italy) Domenico Caso	Kappa	None
Genoa	(Italy) Tarcisio Burgnich	Erreà	Festival Crociere
Hellas Verona	(Italy) Sergio Maddè	Erreà	Z.G. Camini
Lucchese	(Italy) Luigi De Canio	Erreà	Cremlat
Monza	(Italy) Pierluigi Frosio	Reebok	Firestone
Padova	(Italy) Mario Colautti	Diadora	Cassa di Risparmio di Padova e Rovigo
Perugia	(Italy) Ilario Castagner	Galex	Colussi
Pescara	(Italy) Adriano Buffoni	Puma	Gelati Gis
Ravenna	(Italy) Sergio Santarini	Erreà	Lloyd Italico
Reggiana	(Italy) Franco Varrella	Asics	Latte Giglio
Reggina	(Italy) Franco Colomba	Asics	Caffè Mauro
Salernitana	(Italy) Delio Rossi	Asics	Exigo Jeans & Casual
Torino	(Italy) Edoardo Reja	Kelme	SDA Express Courier
Treviso	(Italy) Gianfranco Bellotto	Lotto	Segafredo
Venezia	(Italy) Walter Novellino	Virma	Emmezeta

== Final classification ==
Pos	Team	Pld	W	D	L	GF	GA	GD	Pts	Promotion or relegation
1	Salernitana (P, C)	38	19	15	4	65	32	+33	72	Promotion to Serie A
2	Venezia (P)	38	17	13	8	51	31	+20	64	Promotion to Serie A
3	Cagliari (P)	38	15	18	5	53	36	+17	63	Promotion to Serie A
4	Perugia (P)	38	15	17	6	52	35	+17	62	Serie A after tie-breaker
5	Torino	38	17	11	10	50	40	+10	62	Promotion tie-breaker
6	Hellas Verona	38	15	8	15	51	38	+13	53	
7	Reggina	38	13	14	11	37	41	−4	53	
8	Treviso	38	12	16	10	43	42	+1	52	
9	Genoa	38	14	9	15	50	53	−3	51	
10	Chievo	38	12	14	12	43	46	−3	50	
11	Reggiana	38	13	11	14	36	35	+1	50	
12	Fidelis Andria	38	11	15	12	42	43	−1	48	
13	Pescara	38	12	11	15	41	48	−7	47	
14	Ravenna	38	11	12	15	41	43	−2	45	
15	Monza	38	9	17	12	48	56	−8	44	
16	Lucchese	38	11	11	16	35	47	−12	44	
17	Foggia (R)	38	9	14	15	48	55	−7	41	Relegation to Serie C1
18	Ancona (R)	38	8	16	14	49	61	−12	40	Relegation to Serie C1
19	Padova (R)	38	8	12	18	30	49	−19	36	Relegation to Serie C1
20	Castel di Sangro (R)	38	5	15	18	38	64	−26	30	Relegation to Serie C1

Rules for classification: 1) points; 2) head-to-head points; 3) head-to-head goal difference; 4) head-to-head goals scored; 5) goal difference; 6) number of goals scored.
(C) Champions; (P) Promoted; (R) Relegated

== Results ==
Home \ Away	ANC	CAG	CDS	CHV	FAN	FOG	GEN	LUC	MON	PAD	PER	PES	RAV	REA	REG	SAL	TOR	TRV	VEN	HEL
Ancona	—	4–1	1–1	3–2	2–0	3–2	4–3	0–1	0–1	0–0	2–2	0–0	0–2	1–1	2–3	3–3	1–0	4–4	0–1	0–0
Cagliari	3–0	—	1–1	2–2	3–0	1–1	1–1	3–1	2–2	1–0	0–0	2–0	2–1	0–0	2–0	1–1	2–2	2–0	1–1	2–1
Castel di Sangro	1–1	0–3	—	0–4	3–3	0–1	3–3	0–2	1–1	1–1	1–1	1–1	2–1	2–2	1–1	3–5	2–1	0–0	1–3	0–2
Chievo	0–1	2–1	1–1	—	1–1	1–1	0–1	3–1	1–1	1–1	1–1	2–2	2–0	1–0	1–0	1–1	0–2	1–0	1–1	2–0
Fidelis Andria	1–1	1–1	1–0	1–0	—	2–0	2–0	3–0	1–3	2–0	1–1	3–0	0–0	1–1	0–2	2–2	0–2	0–0	1–1	1–0
Foggia	2–2	1–1	2–0	0–1	2–1	—	3–1	2–2	5–1	2–0	1–1	1–0	2–2	0–2	3–2	2–0	0–3	0–0	1–2	0–0
Genoa	2–1	1–3	2–1	0–1	2–1	3–2	—	1–1	5–1	1–0	2–0	4–0	1–0	2–2	0–0	1–1	2–2	0–1	3–1	1–0
Lucchese	1–1	1–2	1–0	1–2	1–0	2–0	2–3	—	0–0	2–0	0–0	0–3	2–1	2–1	0–1	1–1	3–1	0–0	2–0	1–0
Monza	3–3	0–0	2–2	1–0	1–1	1–1	0–0	3–1	—	2–0	0–2	1–1	1–2	0–0	0–1	1–1	1–1	1–1	1–0	5–1
Padova	0–1	1–2	0–1	3–2	0–0	3–0	1–1	1–1	1–2	—	3–1	1–0	0–0	0–0	3–1	0–0	2–1	0–0	0–0	0–0
Perugia	1–1	1–1	1–0	3–0	4–1	2–2	1–0	1–0	3–2	1–3	—	1–1	2–1	2–0	0–1	1–1	2–1	2–1	2–0	2–1
Pescara	3–2	0–1	1–2	3–1	0–2	1–0	1–0	2–1	2–2	4–0	1–2	—	1–1	2–0	1–1	0–0	3–0	1–0	2–1	1–1
Ravenna	2–0	0–0	1–3	2–0	0–1	3–1	3–0	2–1	1–1	1–0	0–0	2–1	—	2–3	2–2	0–0	1–1	2–0	1–0	1–1
Reggiana	1–0	0–0	1–0	2–2	1–0	1–0	0–1	3–0	0–2	0–2	2–0	1–0	1–1	—	1–1	0–1	0–1	1–0	2–0	0–1
Reggina	2–1	2–2	2–1	0–0	2–3	0–0	2–0	0–0	1–0	3–0	0–1	0–0	1–0	1–0	—	1–0	2–2	0–0	1–1	0–3
Salernitana	3–2	1–0	1–0	2–3	1–1	3–2	2–1	1–1	4–1	2–0	2–0	5–1	1–0	4–0	2–0	—	2–1	4–0	0–0	2–0
Torino	1–1	3–0	4–1	1–1	2–1	1–1	2–1	1–0	1–0	2–1	0–0	0–1	1–0	1–0	2–0	1–0	—	4–0	0–4	2–1
Treviso	5–0	0–1	3–2	0–0	1–1	3–3	2–1	3–0	3–0	3–2	2–1	2–1	3–0	0–5	2–0	1–1	0–0	—	1–1	1–0
Venezia	1–1	2–2	3–0	2–0	1–1	1–0	2–0	0–0	4–2	3–0	2–0	3–0	2–1	2–1	4–0	0–3	0–0	0–0	—	1–0
Hellas Verona	2–0	2–1	0–0	4–0	2–1	3–2	4–0	2–0	3–2	5–1	0–1	2–0	4–2	0–1	1–1	0–2	4–0	1–1	0–1	—

Source: Almanacco Illustrato del Calcio - La Storia 1898-2004, Panini Edizioni, Modena, September 2005
Legend: Blue = home team win; Yellow = draw; Red = away team win.

== Promotion tie-breaker ==
21 June 1998
17:00 CEST

Perugia	1–1 (a.e.t.)	Torino
Tovalieri 76'		Ferrante 79'
Penalties
Bernardini (penalty scored); Rapaić (penalty scored); Materazzi (penalty scored); Colonnello (penalty scored); Tovalieri (penalty scored)	5–4	(penalty scored) Ferrante; (penalty scored) Lentini; (penalty scored) Cravero; (penalty missed) Dorigo; (penalty scored) Carparelli

Stadio Giglio, Reggio Emilia
Attendance: 19,614
Referee: Graziano Cesari

A.C. Perugia promoted to 1998–99 Serie A.

== Top goalscorers ==
Scorer	Goals	Team
(Italy) Marco Di Vaio	21	Salernitana
(Italy) Cosimo Francioso	18	Monza (14) Ravenna (4)
(Italy) Marco Ferrante	18	Torino
(Italy) Roberto Muzzi	17	Cagliari
(Italy) Stefan Schwoch	14	Venezia

== Attendances ==
#	Club	Average
1	Salernitana	22,982
2	Torino	19,505
3	Cagliari	18,065
4	Genoa	12,484
5	Hellas	9,846
6	Perugia	8,306
7	Venezia	7,174
8	Reggiana	6,027
9	Padova	5,731
10	Ancona	5,560
11	Foggia	5,448
12	Reggina	5,285
13	Pescara	4,988
14	Lucchese	4,380
15	Fidelis Andria	4,310
16	Chievo	4,135
17	Ravenna	4,093
18	Treviso	3,946
19	Castel de Sangro	3,282
20	Monza	2,918
