= Gianfranco Casarsa =

Italian football player and manager

Personal information
- Full name: Gianfranco Casarsa
- Date of birth: 28 March 1953 (age 73)
- Place of birth: Udine, Italy
- Height: 1.83 m (6 ft 0 in)
- Position: Forward

Youth career
- 19??–1970: SPAL

Senior career*
Years	Team	Apps	(Gls)
1970–1971	SPAL	4	(1)
1971–1972	Bellaria	28	(11)
1972–1974	Bari	63	(10)
1974–1978	Fiorentina	98	(19)
1978–1981	Perugia	60	(6)
1981–1983	Udinese	8	(0)
1983–1984	Massese	12	(1)
Total		273	(48)

International career
1975	Italy U23	1	(0)

Managerial career
- 1996–1997: Pistoiese
- 1999: Figline
- * Club domestic league appearances and goals

Gianfranco Casarsa (born 28 March 1953) is an Italian former professional footballer and manager who played as a forward.

A physically strong striker with refined technique, Casarsa spent three seasons with Perugia, playing an important role as a starter in the historic Perugia dei miracoli squad that finished the 1978–79 Serie A season undefeated as runners-up. He was also renowned for his unique technique of taking penalty kicks from a standing position without taking a run-up.

== Playing career ==
=== Early career and Fiorentina ===
Born in Udine, Casarsa came through the youth system at SPAL under the presidency of Paolo Mazza, making his Serie C debut in the 1970–71 season. After a prolific spell with Bellaria in Serie D and two Serie B campaigns with Bari, he joined Fiorentina in the summer of 1974.

In Florence, Casarsa immediately established himself as a starting forward. In his debut season in Serie A, he finished as the club's top scorer in the league with 7 goals and helped Fiorentina win the 1974–75 Coppa Italia, scoring crucial goals against Napoli in the semi-final group and Milan in the final. Later that year, he also won the 1975 Anglo-Italian League Cup.

=== Perugia's "Miracle Team" ===
In the summer of 1978, Casarsa joined Perugia, becoming a centerpiece in manager Ilario Castagner's tactical system. During the 1978–79 Serie A campaign, Casarsa featured prominently alongside Walter Speggiorin and Salvatore Bagni in attack. Perugia made history by finishing second behind Milan without suffering a single defeat (11 wins, 19 draws), becoming the first team in modern Italian football history to complete an entire Serie A season unbeaten.

Casarsa remained with Perugia for three seasons, making 60 league appearances and scoring 6 goals in Serie A. Following the aftermath of the 1980 Totonero scandal, in which he was fully acquitted by both sports and judicial courts, a severe knee injury suffered in August 1980 severely limited his playing career.

=== Later years ===
In 1981, he returned to his home region to join Udinese, where he made 8 Serie A appearances before concluding his professional career with Massese in 1984. Over his career, Casarsa accumulated 166 appearances and 25 goals in Serie A, alongside 63 appearances and 10 goals in Serie B.

== Style of play ==
Casarsa was a modern, physically imposing center-forward who actively participated in team build-up play rather than acting solely as a target man. He achieved cult status in Italian football for his distinctive penalty-taking routine: taking no run-up whatsoever, he would strike the ball directly from a standing position, relying entirely on leg strength and precision to deceive goalkeepers.

== Honours ==
=== Player ===
Fiorentina

- Coppa Italia: 1974–75
- Anglo-Italian League Cup: 1975

Perugia

- Serie A runner-up (unbeaten): 1978–79
