= Bordon (surname) =

Bordon is a surname. Notable people with the surname include:

- Antonio Bordon, Paraguayan handball coach
- Furio Bordon, Italian writer
- Ivano Bordon (born 1951), Italian footballer
- José Octavio Bordón (born 1945), Argentine politician and diplomat
- Luis Bordón, Paraguayan musician and composer
- Marcelo Bordon (born 1976), Brazilian footballer
- Nadia Bordon (born 1988), Argentine handball player
- Orlando Bordón (born 1986), Paraguayan footballer
- Patrik Bordon (born 1988), Slovenian footballer
- Rebeca Bordon (born 1994), Paraguayan handball player
- Stefano Bordon (born 1968), Italian rugby player and coach
- Willer Bordon (1949–2015), Italian, academic, businessman and politician
