= Walter Speggiorin =

Italian footballer

- Speggiorin with Fiorentina in 1975

Personal information
- Date of birth: 16 December 1952 (age 73)
- Place of birth: Camisano Vicentino, Italy
- Position: Forward

Youth career
- 19??–1968: Vicenza

Senior career*
Years	Team	Apps	(Gls)
1968–1969	Vicenza	0	(0)
1969–1972	Genoa	52	(14)
1972–1973	Vicenza	14	(1)
1973–1976	Fiorentina	52	(8)
1976–1977	Napoli	19	(4)
1977–1979	Perugia	44	(17)
1979–1981	Napoli	38	(3)
1981–1982	Lazio	21	(2)
1982–1984	Massese	20	(1)

International career
1973	Italy U21	1	(1)
- * Club domestic league appearances and goals

Walter Speggiorin (Italian pronunciation: [ˈvalter speddʒoˈrin]; born 16 December 1952) is an Italian former professional footballer who played as a forward.

== Club career ==
Speggiorin began his career with local teams before moving to L.R. Vicenza's main team in 1968. In the 1969–1970 season, he transferred to Genoa, in Serie B, where he debuted at the age of seventeen, scoring two goals in five matches before being sidelined by a serious injury. He remained with Genoa for the next two seasons, including a stint in Serie C in the 1970–1971 season, before returning in the summer of 1972 to Lanerossi Vicenza, where he made his Serie A debut on 24 September against Torino. Acquired by Fiorentina in the summer of 1973, he spent three seasons in Tuscany, showing his offensive qualities but also inconsistency, which prevented him from establishing himself as a regular starter. With Fiorentina, he won the Coppa Italia in 1975 and an Anglo-Italian League Cup where he scored the winning goal in the return leg against West Ham United.

In 1976, he moved to Napoli where he had a relatively anonymous season in the league, but stood out in continental competitions. Speggiorin registered 3 goals for the Partenopei in the 1976–77 Cup Winners' Cup, scoring two of his three goals, in the first-leg of an away match against Norwegian side Bodø/Glimt in the first round. He then scored his third goal of the competition, in the second-leg against Cypriot side APOEL at Stadio San Paolo to give Napoli a 2–0 win in the second round (3–1 on aggregate), sending them through to the quarterfinals. Following a goalless draw in the first-leg, Napoli scored twice in the return leg in Italy to eliminate Polish side Śląsk Wrocław and progress to the semifinal stage of the tournament. Speggiorin was involved in a controversial incident during the semifinal second-leg, scoring a goal against Anderlecht that was disallowed by English referee Bob Matthewson. He also performed well in the Anglo-Italian League Cup, scoring a brace against Southampton in the return leg to secure the trophy for Napoli.

Transferred to AC Perugia, he arguably played his best two seasons there. Under coach Ilario Castagner, he played as a left winger alongside young talent Salvatore Bagni, supporting striker Gianfranco Casarsa. Speggiorin began to score with a consistency he had not shown before—17 goals in 44 appearances over two seasons, finishing as the top scorer for Perugia both times. He played a significant role in the notable achievements of the so-called "Perugia of miracles," including a second-place finish in the 1978–1979 Serie A season and a record-breaking unbeaten run.

In the summer of 1978, Perugia also won the Karl Rappan Cup, their first international trophy, with Speggiorin contributing 4 goals.

Throughout his career, Speggiorin amassed a total of 167 appearances and 33 goals in Serie A, and 49 matches and 7 goals in Serie B.

== International career ==
In 1973, he scored a goal in his only appearance for the Italy under-21 team against France in Paris.

== Honours ==
=== Club ===
ACF Fiorentina

- Coppa Italia: 1974–75
