= Franco Vannini =

Italian football player and manager

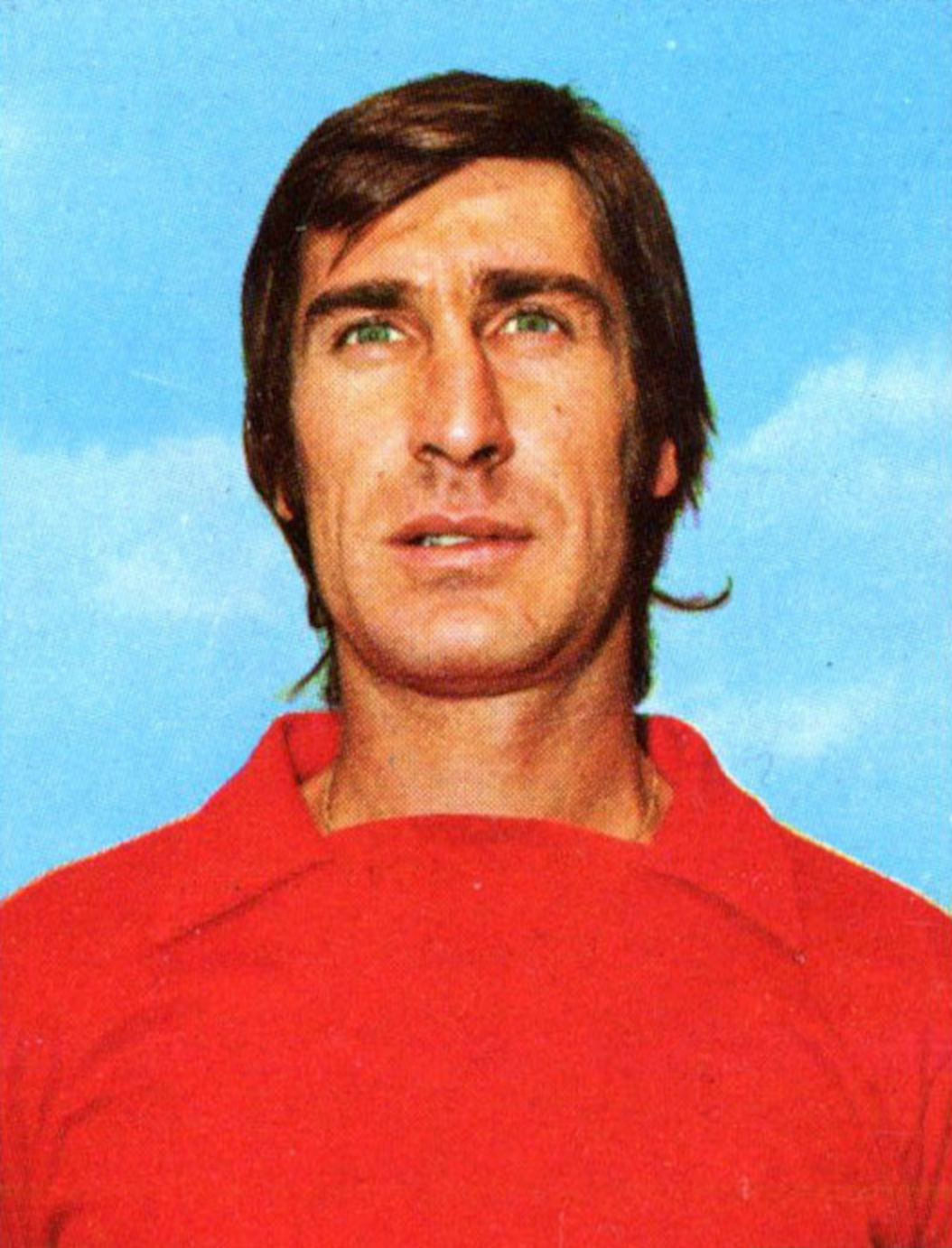
- Vannini with Perugia in 1975

Personal information
- Date of birth: 7 October 1947 (age 79)
- Place of birth: San Giovanni Valdarno, Italy
- Height: 1.89 m (6 ft 2 in)
- Position: Midfielder

Youth career
- 1963–1966: Arezzo

Senior career*
| Years | Team | Apps | (Gls) |
| 1966–1967 | Arezzo | 1 | (0) |
| 1967–1968 | Entella | 23 | (5) |
| 1968–1971 | Como | 83 | (8) |
| 1971–1972 | Foggia | 2 | (0) |
| 1972–1974 | Como | 45 | (8) |
| 1974–1979 | Perugia | 128 | (29) |
| Total | | 283 | (50) |

Managerial career
- 1986–1987: Jesina
- 1987–1988: Monopoli
- 1988–1989: Teramo
- 1989–1991: Fidelis Andria
- 1991–1992: Catania
- 1992–1993: Monopoli
- 1993–1994: Giarre
- 1994–1995: Cremapergo
- 1995–1996: Pro Sesto 1913
- 1996–1997: Pisa
- 1997–1998: Cremapergo
- * Club domestic league appearances and goals

Franco Vannini (born 7 October 1947 in San Giovanni Valdarno) is a former Italian professional football player and manager. As a footballer he played as a midfielder.

== Club career ==
Vannini played for several Italian clubs throughout his career, in particular he played for Perugia; he helped them win the Serie B in 1974–75, and was close to winning the 1978–79 Serie A, finishing unbeaten in second place. However, it was during that season that the midfielder fell victim to a serious injury, in the home match against Inter (2-2) on February 4, 1979, which ended his career: a foul by Inter defender Adriano Fedele, committed while the game was stopped just moments after Vannini had halved the temporary double disadvantage of the Umbrians, caused him a double fracture of the tibia and fibula and a consequent halt that deprived the Griffins of one of their leaders in the race for the championship.

Due to the aftermath of the injury, and despite numerous attempts to return, the player was unable to take the field in official matches (although he was included in the Perugia roster until the 1980–1981 season) and had to prematurely end his playing career, at just over thirty-one years old. In his career, he totaled 98 appearances and 22 goals in Serie A, and 162 appearances and 23 goals in Serie B.

== Honours ==
=== Player ===
Perugia

- Serie B: 1974–75
