= Ilario Castagner =

Italian football manager and player

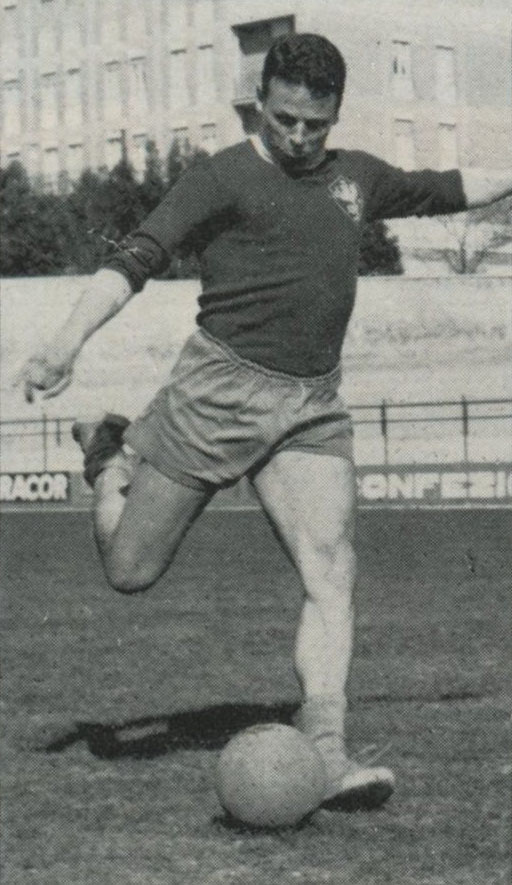
- Castagner during his playing days with Perugia in the 1960s

Personal information
- Full name: Ilario Castagner
- Date of birth: 18 December 1940
- Place of birth: Vittorio Veneto, Italy
- Date of death: 18 February 2023 (aged 82)
- Place of death: Perugia, Italy
- Height: 1.80 m (5 ft 11 in)
- Position: Forward

Youth career
- 1957–1959: Reggiana

Senior career*
Years	Team	Apps	(Gls)
1959–1960	Reggiana	9	(2)
1960–1961	Legnano	23	(5)
1961–1964	Perugia	84	(33)
1964–1967	Prato	83	(17)
1967–1969	Rimini	51	(16)
Total		250	(73)

Managerial career
- 1969–1971: Atalanta (assistant)
- 1971–1974: Atalanta (youth)
- 1974–1980: Perugia
- 1980–1982: Lazio
- 1982–1984: A.C. Milan
- 1984–1985: Internazionale
- 1986–1988: Ascoli
- 1989: Pescara
- 1991–1992: Pisa
- 1993–1995: Perugia
- 1998–1999: Perugia
- * Club domestic league appearances and goals

Ilario Castagner (18 December 1940 – 18 February 2023) was an Italian professional football manager and player who played as a forward.

Castagner's career and legacy were deeply tied to Perugia. As a striker in the 1960s, he finished as the top scorer of Serie C with the club in 1963–64. As a manager, he led the iconic Perugia dei miracoli ("Miracle Perugia") squad of the late 1970s, which became the first team in modern Italian football history to complete an entire Serie A season undefeated during the 1978–79 campaign, finishing as runners-up.

Over three distinct spells as Perugia head coach, Castagner also won the 1974–75 Serie B title, the 1993–94 Serie C1 title, and secured a further promotion to Serie A in 1998. During his managerial career, he also coached major Italian clubs including Lazio, Milan—winning the Serie B title in 1982–83—and Internazionale, whom he led to the semi-finals of the UEFA Cup in 1985.

== Playing career ==
Born in Vittorio Veneto, Castagner played as a center-forward. He made his professional debut with Reggiana in Serie B during the 1959–60 season.

He then spent the remainder of his playing career in Serie C, joining Legnano before being scouted by manager Guido Mazzetti, who brought him to Perugia in 1961. Castagner spent three seasons with Perugia, enjoying his finest personal year in 1963–64, when he finished as top goalscorer of Serie C (Girone B) with 17 goals.

After three seasons at Prato, Castagner ended his playing career prematurely in 1969 with Rimini at the age of 28 to focus entirely on coaching.

== Managerial career ==
=== Early years and the "Miracle Perugia" ===
Having attended coaching courses while still a player, Castagner was appointed assistant manager at Atalanta under Corrado Viciani in 1969. He subsequently took over Atalanta's youth sector, guiding them to the national championship finals.

In the summer of 1974, at just 33 years old, Castagner returned to Perugia as head coach under new club president Franco D'Attoma. In his very first season, he orchestrated an unexpected promotion, guiding the club to their first-ever 1974–75 Serie B championship title.

In Serie A, Castagner developed a flexible, modern tactical scheme heavily inspired by Dutch Total Football, integrating young players like Renato Curi and Paolo Sollier alongside sporting director Silvano Ramaccioni. Despite the tragic death of Curi in 1977, Perugia established themselves as one of Italy's elite sides.

The peak of Castagner's first tenure came in the 1978–79 Serie A season. Perugia finished second behind Milan without suffering a single defeat (11 wins, 19 draws), becoming the first team since the introduction of the single-group system in Italian football to complete an entire top-flight campaign unbeaten. The second-place finish remains the highest league placing in Perugia's history, and Castagner was awarded the prestigious Seminatore d'oro as the best Italian manager of the season. He also led Perugia to win the Coppa d'Estate in 1978 and to their European debut in the 1979–80 UEFA Cup.

=== Lazio, Milan and Inter Milan ===
In 1980, following the Totonero scandal that penalized Perugia, Castagner was appointed head coach of Lazio in Serie B, narrowingly missing out on promotion before leaving in 1982.

In the summer of 1982, Castagner took charge of A.C. Milan, who were competing in Serie B. He successfully restored the *Rossoneri* to Serie A by winning the 1982–83 Serie B title and promoted young talents like Alberico Evani and Mauro Tassotti. He coached Milan in Serie A the following year before departing in 1984.

Castagner stayed in Milan for the 1984–85 season, crossing the city divide to manage Internazionale. He led Inter to a third-place finish in Serie A and guided them to the semi-finals of the 1984–85 UEFA Cup, where they were eliminated by Real Madrid.

=== Ascoli, Pescara and Pisa ===
In November 1986, Castagner was hired by Ascoli. Just days after his arrival, he led the team to victory in the 1986–87 Mitropa Cup. He successfully saved Ascoli from Serie A relegation in 1987 and maintained top-flight status the following season. He later had brief managerial spells in Serie B with Pescara (1989) and Pisa (1991–1992).

=== Return to Perugia and later career ===
In 1993, Castagner returned to Perugia under president Luciano Gaucci. He led the club to win the 1993–94 Serie C1 title with 71 points, earning promotion to Serie B.

He returned for a third stint at Perugia in March 1998, with eleven games remaining in the Serie B season. Castagner led a remarkable late-season comeback, finishing tied for fourth place with Torino. Perugia won the promotion tie-breaker on penalties against the Granata, securing Castagner's second top-flight promotion with the club.

During the 1998–99 Serie A season, Castagner helped oversee the rapid rise of Japanese playmaker Hidetoshi Nakata. However, following disputes with president Gaucci, Castagner resigned in February 1999 and retired from full-time coaching.

In August 2005, following Perugia's bankruptcy and re-foundation under the *Lodo Petrucci*, Castagner returned to the club as technical director and honorary president, roles he held until October 2006.

== Later life and death ==
After retiring from managing, Castagner worked extensively as a television football pundit and analyst for outlets such as Telemontecarlo, Mediaset Premium, and RAI.

Having permanently settled in Perugia during his coaching career, Castagner died in the city on 18 February 2023 at the age of 82.

== Honours ==
=== Manager ===
Perugia

- Serie B: 1974–75
- Serie C1: 1993–94 (Girone B)
- Coppa d'Estate: 1978
- Serie A runner-up (unbeaten): 1978–79

Milan

- Serie B: 1982–83

Ascoli

- Mitropa Cup: 1986–87

=== Individual ===
- Seminatore d'oro: 1974–75 (Serie B), 1978–79 (Serie A)
