= Antonio Ceccarini =

Italian football player and manager (1949–2015)

Personal information
- Date of birth: 18 October 1949
- Place of birth: Sant'Angelo in Vado, Italy
- Date of death: 29 August 2015 (aged 65)
- Place of death: Perugia, Italy
- Position: Defender

Youth career
- 19??–19??: Vadese

Senior career*
Years	Team	Apps	(Gls)
1968-1972	Città di Castello	79	(2)
1972-1973	Acireale	26	(1)
1973-1974	Catania	35	(0)
1974-1975	Avellino	32	(1)
1975–1976	Catania	20	(0)
1976-1983	Perugia	175	(2)
1983-1984	Messina	30	(2)
1984-1986	Foligno	41	(0)
Total		438	(8)

Managerial career
- 1986–1987: Perugia (assistant coach)
- * Club domestic league appearances and goals

Antonio Ceccarini (18 October 1949 – 29 August 2015) was an Italian professional football player and manager. He played as a defender as a player.

== Club career ==
Ceccarini started his career in his hometown club, Vadese, before being scouted by Silvano Ramaccioni, who facilitated his transition to Città di Castello in 1968. He then played for several Italian clubs before moving to top flight club Perugia; he helped them win their inaugural international trophy, the Rappan Cup, and was close to winning the 1978–79 Serie A, finishing unbeaten in second place. Renowned for his unwavering determination, he earned the moniker "Tigre" (Italian for "Tiger"). A defining moment of his career occurred in 1979 when he scored a pivotal goal against Inter Milan, ensuring Perugia's undefeated status for the season.
