= Silvano Ramaccioni =

Italian football executive and sporting director

Personal information
- Date of birth: 15 January 1939 (age 87)
- Place of birth: Città di Castello, Italy

Managerial career
- Years: Team
- 1973–1974: Cesena (sporting director)
- 1975–1981: Perugia (sporting director)
- 1982–1989: AC Milan (sporting director)
- 1989–2008: AC Milan (team manager)

Silvano Ramaccioni (born 15 January 1939) is an Italian football executive and former sporting director.

== Managerial career ==
He began his career in football as the secretary of Città di Castello, a role he held from 1963 to 1973. Subsequently, after a year as sports director of Cesena in Serie A in the 1973–74 season, he took on the same role at Perugia from the following season.

He sat as a sporting director on the bench of the Grifoni in the 1978-79 season, the season of Perugia's miracles, which went down in Italian football history as the first team in the history of the single round to remain unbeaten for an entire season.

In 1982, he moved to Milan, where he served as sports director until 1989 and subsequently as team manager until 2008. In the 1991–92 season, he managed to repeat the record achieved in Perugia thirteen years earlier. In fact, Fabio Capello's Milan led the championship from start to finish, remaining unbeaten and winning the league title.

On July 5, 2010, he received a special career award from the province of Perugia.
