= Franco D'Attoma =

Italian football executive (1923–1991)

Franco D'Attoma (February 24, 1923 – May 7, 1991) was an Italian entrepreneur and sportsman. He was the president of the "Perugia of miracles" team that remained unbeaten in the 1978-79 Serie A season.

== Biography ==
Franco D'Attoma, born in Puglia into a wealthy family exporting agricultural products to the United States, attended a high school in Puglia before pursuing a degree in agriculture at the University of Perugia.

In 1960 he joined the renowned clothing industry Ellesse as a partner, having become the brother-in-law of Leonardo Servadio. Servadio freely transferred some shares to him. D'Attoma was tasked with handling administration and personnel relations. He later ascended to management within Ellesse, before transitioning to sports management for AC Perugia. Collaborating with Spartaco Ghini, an industrialist, they laid the foundation for promotion to Serie A. Perugia's peak under his management was reached in the 1978–79 season, where they finished Runners Up behind Serie A champions AC Milan without losing a single game.

D'Attoma introduced the Perugia kit for the 1979-1980 season, marking the debut of jersey sponsorship in Italian football. Together with the introduction of shirt sponsorships, initially banned by the FIGC, he also pioneered the acquisition of players on loan. Finding a loophole in sponsorship regulations, D'Attoma founded a textile company under the guise of a pasta factory, effectively becoming the true sponsor, revolutionizing football economics.

His acquisition of Paolo Rossi showcased D'Attoma's extraordinary abilities. Despite competition from major clubs like Juventus, Milan, and Inter, Perugia secured Rossi on loan for a record fee of 500 million lire.
