= 1966–67 Serie C =

Italian football league season

The 1966–67 Serie C was the twenty-ninth edition of Serie C, the third highest league in the Italian football league system.

== Group A (North) ==
Pos	Team	Pld	W	D	L	GF	GA	GD	Pts	Promotion or relegation
1	Monza (P)	34	20	10	4	56	18	+38	50 (Note: Promoted after play-off match in Bergamo: Como-Monza 0-1)	Promoted to Serie B
2	Como	34	19	12	3	53	19	+34	50	
3	Treviso	34	16	12	6	38	33	+5	44	
4	Udinese	34	14	12	8	44	34	+10	40	
5	Biellese	34	12	13	9	30	32	−2	37	
6	Verbania	34	13	10	11	31	30	+1	36	
7	Legnano	34	13	8	13	52	44	+8	34	
8	Trevigliese	34	13	7	14	37	36	+1	33	
9	Rapallo Ruentes	34	10	13	11	25	26	−1	33	
10	Solbiatese	34	11	10	13	27	26	+1	32	
11	Pro Patria	34	11	10	13	41	42	−1	32	
12	Marzotto	34	10	11	13	30	35	−5	31	
13	Piacenza	34	10	11	13	28	34	−6	31	
14	Monfalcone	34	9	13	12	26	39	−13	31	
15	Entella	34	7	15	12	22	30	−8	29	
16	Triestina	34	5	17	12	19	35	−16	27	
17	Mestrina (H)	34	7	11	16	17	29	−12	25 (Note: Reelected by the Semipro League.)	
18	Cremonese (R)	34	6	5	23	26	60	−34	17	Relegated to Serie D

Source: Panini
(H) Hosts; (P) Promoted; (R) Relegated

== Group B (Centre) ==
Pos	Team	Pld	W	D	L	GF	GA	GD	Pts	Promotion or relegation
1	Perugia (P)	34	16	14	4	40	22	+18	46	Promoted to Serie B
2	Maceratese	34	17	11	6	34	22	+12	45	
3	Cesena	34	15	10	9	43	29	+14	40	
4	Prato	34	14	12	8	37	24	+13	40	
5	Spezia	34	13	14	7	28	21	+7	40	
6	Anconitana	34	13	12	9	29	27	+2	38	
7	Massese	34	11	14	9	34	26	+8	36	
8	Ternana	34	9	17	8	24	23	+1	35	
9	Sambenedettese	34	9	14	11	29	31	−2	32	
10	Carrarese	34	10	11	13	22	27	−5	31	
11	Torres	34	9	12	13	21	26	−5	30	
12	Empoli	34	11	8	15	27	33	−6	30	
13	Rimini	34	11	8	15	17	24	−7	30	
14	Siena	34	9	11	14	29	35	−6	29	
15	Pistoiese	34	8	13	13	35	48	−13	29	
16	Ravenna	34	9	10	15	37	43	−6	28	
17	Jesi (H)	34	8	12	14	28	35	−7	28 (Note: Tie-breaker match in Riccione: Jesi-Ravenna 0-1. Reelected by the Semipro League.)	
18	Vis Pesaro (H)	34	5	15	14	9	27	−18	25 (Note: Reelected by the Semipro League.)	

Source: Panini
(H) Hosts; (P) Promoted

== Group C (South) ==
Pos	Team	Pld	W	D	L	GF	GA	GD	Pts	Promotion or relegation
1	Bari (P)	34	17	14	3	38	14	+24	48	Promoted to Serie B
2	Avellino	34	16	9	9	43	23	+20	41	
3	Taranto	34	14	10	10	33	24	+9	38	
4	Casertana	34	14	10	10	33	28	+5	38	
5	Barletta	34	15	7	12	34	31	+3	37	
6	Pescara	34	15	6	13	33	29	+4	36	
7	Cosenza	34	13	9	12	31	26	+5	35	
8	Trapani	34	11	12	11	31	29	+2	34	
9	Lecce	34	10	13	11	30	27	+3	33	
10	Del Duca Ascoli	34	13	6	15	28	30	−2	32	
11	Massiminiana	34	10	12	12	25	29	−4	32	
12	Nardò	34	10	11	13	23	28	−5	31	
13	L'Aquila	34	10	11	13	22	29	−7	31	
14	Trani	34	9	13	12	40	49	−9	31	
15	Akragas	34	11	8	15	25	38	−13	30	
16	Siracusa	34	11	8	15	25	40	−15	30	
17	Crotone (H)	34	11	7	16	29	35	−6	29 (Note: Reelected by the Semipro League.)	
18	Frosinone (R)	34	9	8	17	23	37	−14	26	Relegated to Serie D

Source: Panini
(H) Hosts; (P) Promoted; (R) Relegated

== Reform ==
In summer 1967 the Semiprofessional League decided a sudden reform of the Serie C with immediate effect. Matchdays would pass from thirty-four to thirty-eight. Four clubs were consequently reelected.

== References and sources ==
- Almanacco Illustrato del Calcio – La Storia 1898–2004, Panini Edizioni, Modena, September 2005
