= Renato Curi =

Italian footballer

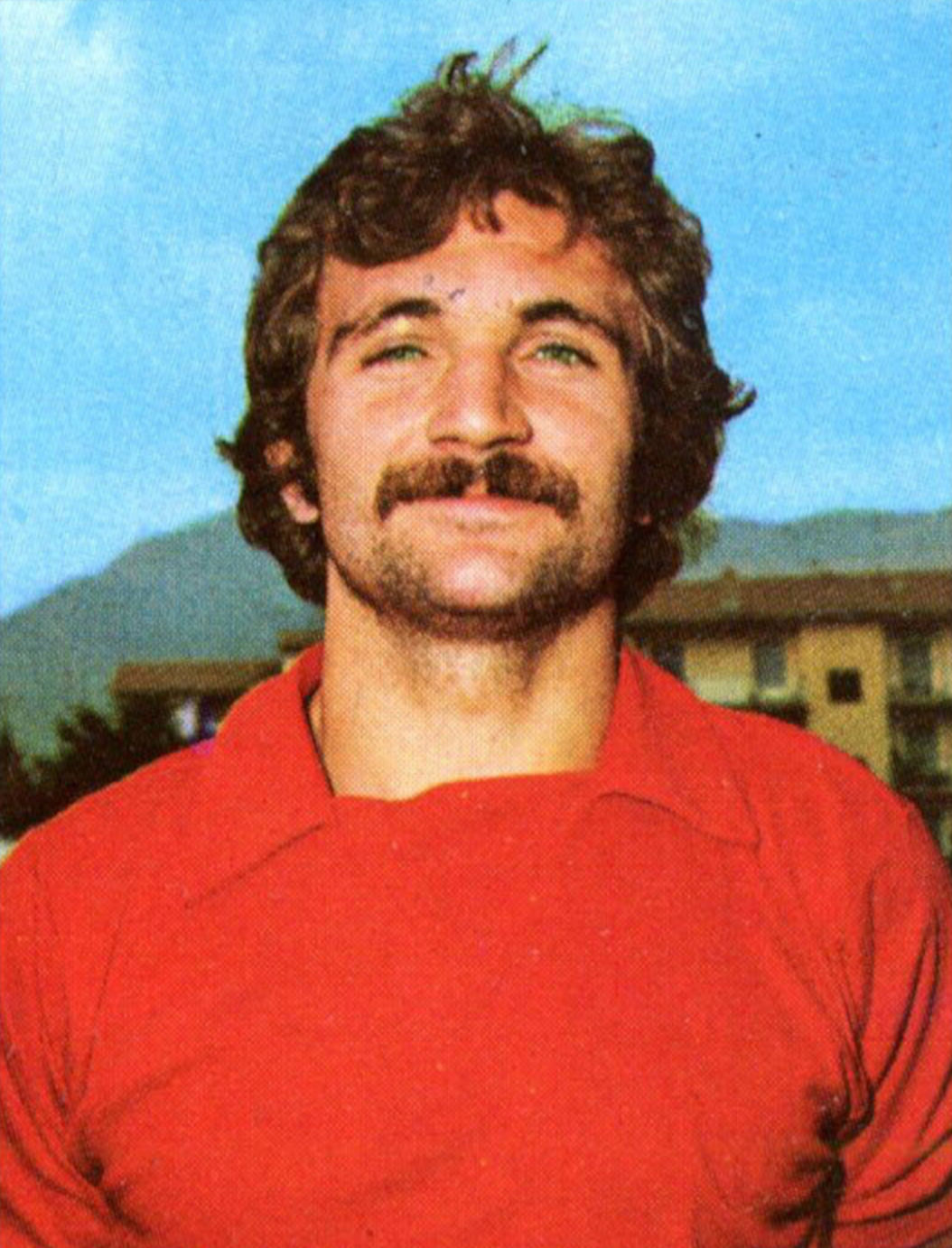
- Curi with Perugia in 1975

Personal information
- Full name: Renato Curi
- Date of birth: 20 September 1953
- Place of birth: Montefiore dell'Aso, Italy
- Date of death: 30 October 1977 (aged 24)
- Place of death: Perugia, Italy
- Position: Midfielder

Senior career*
Years	Team	Apps	(Gls)
1969–1973	Giulianova	105	(3)
1973–1974	Como	24	(0)
1974–1977	Perugia	81	(7)
Total		210	(10)
- * Club domestic league appearances and goals

Renato Curi (20 September 1953 – 30 October 1977) was an Italian footballer who played as a midfielder. He is best known for his tenure as a Perugia mainstay in the 1970s until his tragic death during a league game against Juventus.

== Biography ==
Renato Curi was born in Montefiore dell'Aso, Province of Ascoli Piceno in 1953. He started his professional career in 1969 with then-amateur club Giulianova, helping his side win promotion to Serie C. He left Giulianova in 1973 for Como, and then joined Serie B club Perugia one year later. Under the guidance of coach Ilario Castagner, he contributed to Perugia's historical first promotion to Serie A and became a grifoni mainstay in the following years. Notably, his impressive performances were instrumental in securing Perugia a historic sixth-place finish in their 1976–77 Serie A campaign, fueling rumours of a possible call-up to the Italy national football team. However, this never came to fruition, as Curi suddenly died on 30 October 1977, during a home match against Juventus, just five minutes into the second half, due to a myocardial infarction.

== Legacy ==
The Perugia home stadium where Curi died was later named after him. Also, a Serie D team is named Renato Curi Angolana.

== Bibliography ==
- Bacci, Andrea; Paolo Sollier (2005). Continua a correre Renato Curi. Torino: Bradipolibri.

== See also ==
- List of footballers who died while playing
