= Pierluigi Frosio =

Italian football player and manager (1948–2022)

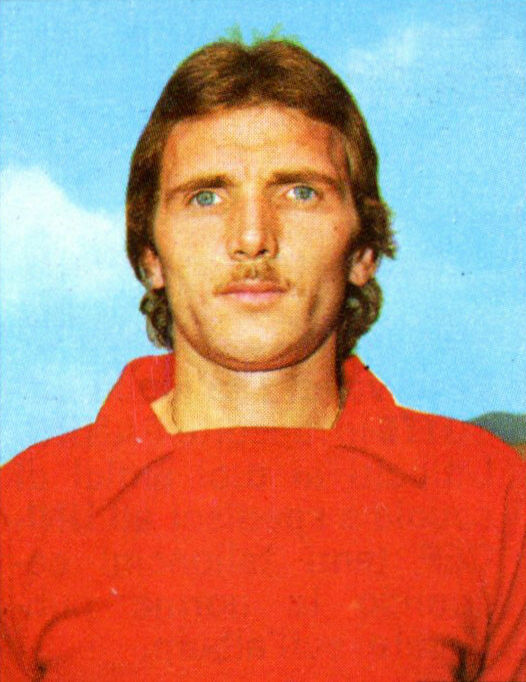
- Frosio with Perugia in 1975

Personal information
- Date of birth: 20 September 1948
- Place of birth: Monza, Italy
- Date of death: 20 February 2022 (aged 73)
- Place of death: Monza, Italy
- Height: 1.82 m (6 ft 0 in)
- Position: Sweeper

Youth career
- 1960–1966: Gerardiana

Senior career*
Years	Team	Apps	(Gls)
1967–1969	Pro Sesto	47	(3)
1969–1971	Legnano	63	(1)
1971–1972	Rovereto	36	(0)
1972–1974	Cesena	22	(0)
1974–1984	Perugia	323	(8)
1984–1985	Rimini	27	(0)
Total		491	(12)

Managerial career
- 1985–1987: Perugia (youth)
- 1986: Perugia
- 1987: Perugia
- 1987–1990: Monza
- 1990–1991: Atalanta
- 1991–1992: Como
- 1992–1993: Modena
- 1993–1994: Ravenna
- 1996: Novara
- 1996–1997: Modena
- 1998–2000: Monza
- 2001–2003: Padova
- 2004–2005: Ancona
- 2006: Lecco
- * Club domestic league appearances and goals

Pierluigi Frosio (20 September 1948 – 20 February 2022) was an Italian professional football player and manager. He played as a sweeper as a player.

== Playing career ==
Born in the Casignolo district of Monza, Frosio began his youth career at local club Gerardiana. He made his Serie B debut in 1972 for Cesena, helping them to their first promotion to the Serie A. Between 1974 and 1984, Frosio played for Perugia; he helped them win the Serie B in 1974–75 as captain, and was close to winning the 1978–79 Serie A, finishing unbeaten in second place.

Frosio finished his career with Rimini in the Serie C2 in 1985, under coach Arrigo Sacchi. He played 175 Serie A games, and 143 Serie B games.

== Managerial career ==
After having retired as a player, Frosio took charge of Perugia's youth sector. In 1987, he was appointed head coach of Monza, whom he helped gain promotion to the Serie B in his first season. He was then head coach of Serie A side Atalanta in 1990; Frosio coached other teams, namely Como, Modena, Ravenna, Novara, before returning to Monza between 1998 and 2000.

He finished his managerial career between the Serie C1 and Serie C2 with Padova, Ancona and Lecco.

== Personal life and death ==
Frosio and his wife Laura have a son, Alex, who worked as a journalist for La Gazzetta dello Sport.

Frosio died in Monza on 20 February 2022, at the age of 73.

== Honours ==
=== Player ===
Perugia

- Serie B: 1974–75

=== Manager ===
Monza

- Serie C1: 1987–88
- Serie C2: 1995–96
- Coppa Italia Serie C: 1987–88
