= Paolo Dal Fiume =

Italian footballer (born 1953)

Personal information
- Date of birth: 23 January 1953 (age 73)
- Place of birth: Giacciano con Baruchella, Italy
- Height: 1.81 m (5 ft 11 in)
- Position: Midfielder

Senior career*
Years	Team	Apps	(Gls)
1971–1973	Torino		
1973–1974	Conegliano Calcio		
1974–1977	A.S. Varese 1910		
1977–1982	Perugia	100	(8)
1982–1985	Napoli	77	(10)
1985–1988	Udinese	22	(0)

Managerial career
- 1992–1993: Catanzaro
- * Club domestic league appearances and goals

Paolo Dal Fiume (born 23 January 1953, in Giacciano con Baruchella) is a retired Italian footballer who played as a midfielder.
