= Raul Morichelli =

Italian footballer (born 2002)

Personal information
- Date of birth: 25 July 2002 (age 24)
- Place of birth: Marino, Lazio, Italy
- Height: 1.93 m (6 ft 4 in)
- Position: Centre back

Team information
- Current team: Anzio

Youth career
- 2015–2022: Roma

Senior career*
Years	Team	Apps	(Gls)
2022–2023	PAOK B	16	(0)
2023–2025	Perugia	4	(0)
2024	→ Sorrento (loan)	1	(0)
2025	→ Messina (loan)	2	(0)
2025–2026	Gravina	6	(0)
2026	Chieti	11	(0)
2026–	Anzio	0	(0)
- * Club domestic league appearances and goals as of 10 November 2026

Raul Morichelli (born 25 July 2002) is an Italian footballer who plays as a centre back for Italian Serie D club Anzio.

== Career ==
On 29 August 2023, Morichelli joined Serie C side Perugia, signing a two-year contract with the club.

On 1 February 2024, Morichelli was loaned by Sorrento, with an option to buy.
