= Gesualdo Piacenti =

Italian footballer

Personal information
- Date of birth: 15 July 1954 (age 72)
- Place of birth: Trevi nel Lazio, Italy
- Height: 1.69 m (5 ft 6 1/2 in)
- Position: Midfielder

Senior career*
Years	Team	Apps	(Gls)
1973–1974	Roma	0	(0)
1974–1975	SPAL	5	(0)
1975	Monza	1	(0)
1975–1976	Campobasso	22	(2)
1976–1977	Siracusa	28	(0)
1977–1978	Roma	14	(0)
1978–1979	Pescara	20	(0)
1979	Roma	0	(0)
1980	Sampdoria	10	(0)
1980–1981	Parma	14	(0)
1981–1982	Latina	9	(0)
- * Club domestic league appearances and goals

Gesualdo Piacenti (born 15 July 1954 in Trevi nel Lazio) is an Italian former footballer who played as a midfielder. He made 123 appearances in the Italian professional leagues. He played one season in Serie A for Roma (1977–78), making 14 appearances.
