= 1937–38 Prima Divisione =

The 1937–38 First Division was the third edition of Regional Prima Divisione, the highest amatorial league in the Italian football league system.

== Lombardy ==
=== Group A ===
1. Armando Casalini 32

2. Ardens 30

3. Caravaggio 23

4. Sebinia 22

4. Pro Ponte 22

6. Cremonese B 20

7. Falck Vobarno 17

8. Trevigliese 16

9. Brescia B 14

10. Carlo Tresoldi 12

11. Crema B 9

=== Group B ===
1. Bareggio 34

2. Varese B 27

3. Fiamma Cremisi 26

4. Ferrario 25

5. S.A.F.F.A. 24

6. Legnano B 21

7. Pro Patria B 20

8. Bernocchi 17

9. Montello 16

10. Stelvio 15

11. Alleanza 8

== Group C ==
1. Como 26

2. Cantù 25

3. Pirelli 21

4. Lecco B 19

5. La Folgore 18

6. Meroni 17

7. Trezzo 16

8. Falck B 14

8. Seregno B 14

10. Monza B 10

== Group D ==
1. Codogno 25

2. Redaelli 23

3. Ernesto Breda 22

3. Bressana 22

5. De Angeli Frua 21

6. Vigevano B 20

7. Bronese 15

8. Fanfulla B 11

8. Pavese Luigi Belli B 11

10. Piacenza B 10

== Finals ==
Pos	Team	Pts	Pld	W	D	L	GF	GA	GD	Qualification
1	Armando Casalini	9	6	3	3	0	7	4	+3	Promoted to 1938–39 Serie C
2	F.C. Como	7	6	3	1	2	9	4	+5	Promoted to 1938–39 Serie C
2	Bareggio	7	6	2	3	1	7	7	0	Bareggio renounces
4	Codogno	1	6	0	1	5	5	13	−8	
