= Furio Bordon =

Italian playwright

Furio Bordon was born and lives in Trieste, Italy.

He graduated in Law and practised briefly as a solicitor, but he left the legal profession at the age of 25, in order to become a full-time writer and director.

He started his career as a playwright at the age of 20 with a TV play produced by the Italian National Television (RAI). His first theatre play was produced one year later by the Trieste Regional Theatre, one of the major public theatres in Italy. Since then, he has written numerous scripts, which have been performed on stage, and broadcast on television and radio.

In 1994, his Caro Elvis, Cara Janis (Dear Elvis, Dear Janis) was awarded with the I.D.I. (Italian Drama Institute) Prize for Best New Play of the Year. His play entitled Le ultime lune (The Last Moons), shortlisted for the I.D.I. Prize in 1993, was performed in Italy by Marcello Mastroianni in 1995 and 1996. Afterwards it was reprised by Gastone Moschin (1998) and eventually by Gianrico Tedeschi for ten consecutive seasons (2000–2010). To date, the play has been translated and produced in 20 foreign countries.

His literary output includes four novels: Giochi di mano (Sleight of Hand), published by Mondadori in 1974, shortlisted for the Viareggio Prize and the Sila Prize, reissued by Sellerio in 2009; Il canto dell’orco (The Ogre’s Song), published by Longanesi in 1985, shortlisted for the Dessì Prize, reissued by Sellerio in 2007; Il favorito degli dei (The Favourite of the Gods), published by Studio Tesi in 1998; La città scura (The Dark City), published by Marsilio in 1994.

As a screenwriter, he has worked with director Valerio Zurlini and producers Franco Cristaldi, Carlo Ponti and Goffredo Lombardo.

Director, artistic manager of theatres and festivals, playwright, he has achieved a remarkable appreciation by audience and critics both at home and abroad (Prix du Theatre 2003 in Brussels, Premio Internazionale Flaiano 2010 in Italy).
