= Paolo Sollier =

Italian footballer and coach

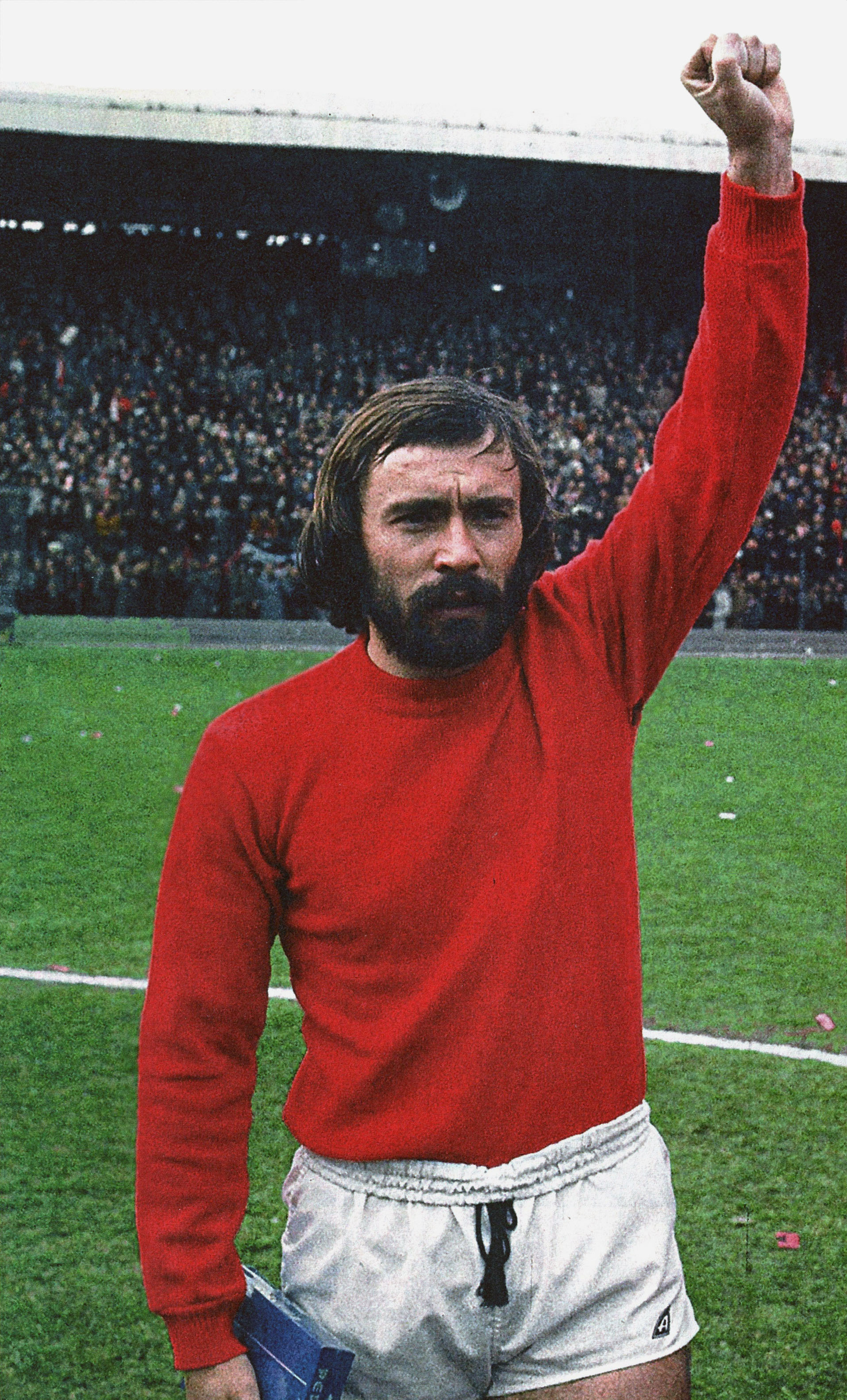
- Sollier with Perugia in 1975

Personal information
- Date of birth: 13 January 1948 (age 78)
- Place of birth: Chiomonte, Italy
- Height: 1.71 m (5 ft 7 in)
- Position: Midfielder

Senior career*
Years	Team	Apps	(Gls)
1969–1973	Cossatese		
1973–1974	Pro Vercelli		
1974–1976	Perugia		
1976–1979	Rimini		
1979–1981	Pro Vercelli		
1981–1984	Biellese		

Managerial career
- 1985–1987: Aosta
- 1990–1991: Pro Vercelli
- 1994–1995: Biellese
- * Club domestic league appearances and goals

Paolo Sollier (born 13 January 1948) is an Italian former football player and coach.

== Playing career ==
Born in Chiomonte, Sollier played as a midfielder. He began his career with Cossatese, combining his football career with a job working in a Fiat factory. He later played professionally for Pro Vercelli. He then moved to Perugia and help them win promotion to Serie A in the 1974–75 season.

He played later with Rimini and Biellese.

Sollier accumulated a total of 21 appearances in Serie A and 124 appearances with 11 goals in Serie B.

== Coaching career ==
He managed Aosta, Pro Vercelli and Biellese.

== Personal life ==
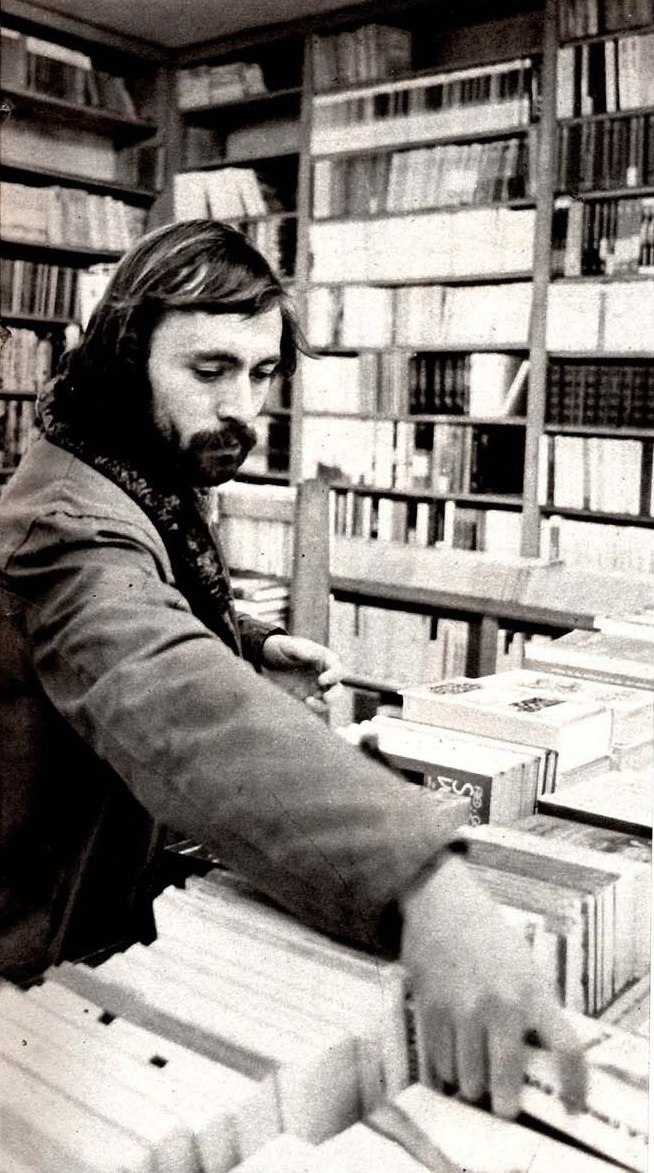
Sollier in a library, 1975

Sollier, a communist, was active in left-wing political activism throughout his football career, and was known for using a clenched fist salute on the pitch.

== Publications ==
- Paolo Sollier (1976). Calci, sputi e colpi di testa (in Italian). Milan, Italy: Gammalibri.
- Paolo Sollier; Paolo La Bua (2008). Spogliatoio (in Italian). Kaos Edizioni.
