= 1975–76 Serie C =

The 1975–76 Serie C was the thirty-eighth edition of Serie C, the third highest league in the Italian football league system.

== Group A (North) ==
Serie C Gir. A 1975-76 team distribution
Serie C Gir. B 1975-76 team distribution
Serie C Gir. B 1975-76 team distribution in Tuscany
Serie C Gir. C 1975-76 team distribution
Serie C Gir. C 1975-76 team distribution in Campania

Pos	Team	Pld	W	D	L	GF	GA	GD	Pts	Promotion or relegation
1	Monza (P)	38	23	12	3	54	20	+34	58	Promoted to Serie B
2	Cremonese	38	16	14	8	37	30	+7	46	
3	Lecco	38	15	14	9	45	33	+12	44	
4	Pro Vercelli	38	16	12	10	38	28	+10	44	
5	Udinese	38	18	7	13	44	36	+8	43	
6	Treviso	38	15	13	10	41	34	+7	43	
7	Mantova	38	12	18	8	36	27	+9	42	
8	Juniorcasale	38	15	11	12	36	32	+4	41	
9	Seregno	38	12	17	9	35	31	+4	41	
10	Venezia	38	13	13	12	35	39	−4	39	
11	Bolzano	38	13	12	13	36	32	+4	38	
12	Padova	38	13	12	13	36	33	+3	38	
13	Albese	38	7	23	8	21	25	−4	37	
14	Sant'Angelo	38	10	16	12	41	36	+5	36	
15	Clodiasottomarina	38	12	12	14	33	39	−6	36	
16	Alessandria	38	11	11	16	27	32	−5	33	
17	Pro Patria	38	9	15	14	32	44	−12	33	
18	Vigevano (R)	38	6	14	18	29	49	−20	26	Relegated to Serie D
19	Trento (R)	38	7	11	20	33	51	−18	25	Relegated to Serie D
20	Belluno (R)	38	3	11	24	18	56	−38	17	Relegated to Serie D

Source: Panini
(P) Promoted; (R) Relegated

== Group B (Centre) ==
Pos	Team	Pld	W	D	L	GF	GA	GD	Pts	Promotion or relegation
1	Rimini (P)	38	20	11	7	45	25	+20	51	Promoted to Serie B
2	Parma	38	16	14	8	42	25	+17	46	
3	Teramo	38	14	16	8	43	28	+15	44	
4	Giulianova	38	14	14	10	36	26	+10	42	
5	Lucchese	38	14	13	11	34	29	+5	41	
6	Arezzo	38	14	12	12	35	33	+2	40	
7	Livorno	38	14	12	12	36	39	−3	40	
8	Massese	38	11	17	10	34	30	+4	39	
9	Pistoiese	38	7	24	7	27	30	−3	38	
10	Empoli	38	12	13	13	36	24	+12	37	
11	Grosseto	38	14	9	15	34	42	−8	37	
12	Sangiovannese	38	9	17	12	27	31	−4	35	
13	Spezia	38	7	21	10	30	35	−5	35	
14	Olbia	38	10	15	13	30	43	−13	35	
15	Pisa	38	6	22	10	26	31	−5	34	
16	Anconitana	38	9	16	13	28	33	−5	34	
17	Riccione	38	11	12	15	37	42	−5	34	
18	Aquila Montevarchi (R)	38	12	10	16	30	36	−6	34 (Note: Relegated for goal difference.)	Relegated to Serie D
19	Chieti (R)	38	9	15	14	21	36	−15	33	Relegated to Serie D
20	Ravenna (R)	38	8	15	15	29	43	−14	31	Relegated to Serie D

Source: Panini
(P) Promoted; (R) Relegated

== Group C (South) ==
Pos	Team	Pld	W	D	L	GF	GA	GD	Pts	Promotion or relegation
1	Lecce (R)	38	22	11	5	54	27	+27	55	Promoted to Serie B
2	Benevento	38	22	9	7	52	29	+23	53	
3	Bari	38	19	12	7	46	24	+22	50	
4	Sorrento	38	16	17	5	36	16	+20	49	
5	Messina	38	14	14	10	29	22	+7	42	
6	Campobasso	38	14	11	13	34	32	+2	39	
7	Reggina	38	13	12	13	37	30	+7	38	
8	Salernitana	38	12	14	12	36	31	+5	38	
9	Nocerina	38	12	14	12	31	28	+3	38	
10	Turris	38	13	12	13	32	34	−2	38	
11	Trapani	38	11	15	12	25	28	−3	37	
12	Crotone	38	11	14	13	27	30	−3	36	
13	Siracusa	38	12	10	16	21	31	−10	34	
14	Barletta	38	9	15	14	29	33	−4	33	
15	Pro Vasto	38	10	12	16	29	36	−7	32	
16	Marsala	38	11	10	17	24	41	−17	32	
17	Cosenza	38	8	16	14	22	40	−18	32	
18	Casertana (R)	38	8	15	15	23	38	−15	31	Relegated to Serie D
19	Acireale (R)	38	5	17	16	22	45	−23	27	Relegated to Serie D
20	Potenza (R)	38	6	14	18	26	40	−14	26	Relegated to Serie D

Source: Panini
(R) Relegated

== References and sources ==
- Almanacco Illustrato del Calcio – La Storia 1898–2004, Panini Edizioni, Modena, September 2005
