= Giorgio Tumbarello =

Italian footballer

Personal information
- Date of birth: 20 April 1996 (age 30)
- Place of birth: Marsala, Italy
- Height: 1.80 m (5 ft 11 in)
- Position: Midfielder

Team information
- Current team: Perugia
- Number: 20

Youth career
- Trapani

Senior career*
Years	Team	Apps	(Gls)
2013–2015	Trapani	0	(0)
2015–2016	Budoni	27	(3)
2016–2017	Marsala	24	(4)
2017–2018	Licata	?	(6)
2018–2019	Cavese	30	(1)
2019–2022	Vibonese	71	(1)
2022–2025	Lucchese	100	(3)
2025–	Perugia	32	(0)
- * Club domestic league appearances and goals as of 30 April 2026

Giorgio Tumbarello (born 20 April 1996) is an Italian professional footballer who plays as a midfielder for Serie C Group B club Perugia.

== Club career ==
In 2018 he joined Serie C club Cavese. Tumbarello made his professional debut on 16 September 2019 against Casertana.

On 16 July 2019, he signed with Vibonese on Serie C. He played two and a half seasons for the club.

On 31 January 2022, he moved to Lucchese.
