= Antonio Bordon =

Paraguayan handball coach

Antonio Bordon is a Paraguayan handball coach.

He coached the Paraguay women's national team, and led them at the 2013 World Women's Handball Championship, which was Paraguay's second ever participation at a World Championship after the 2007 World Women's Handball Championship. They finished 21st of 24, which is their best result (as of 2026).
