= Stadio Renato Curi =

Football stadium in Perugia, Italy

Coordinates: 43°6′22″N 12°21′26″E

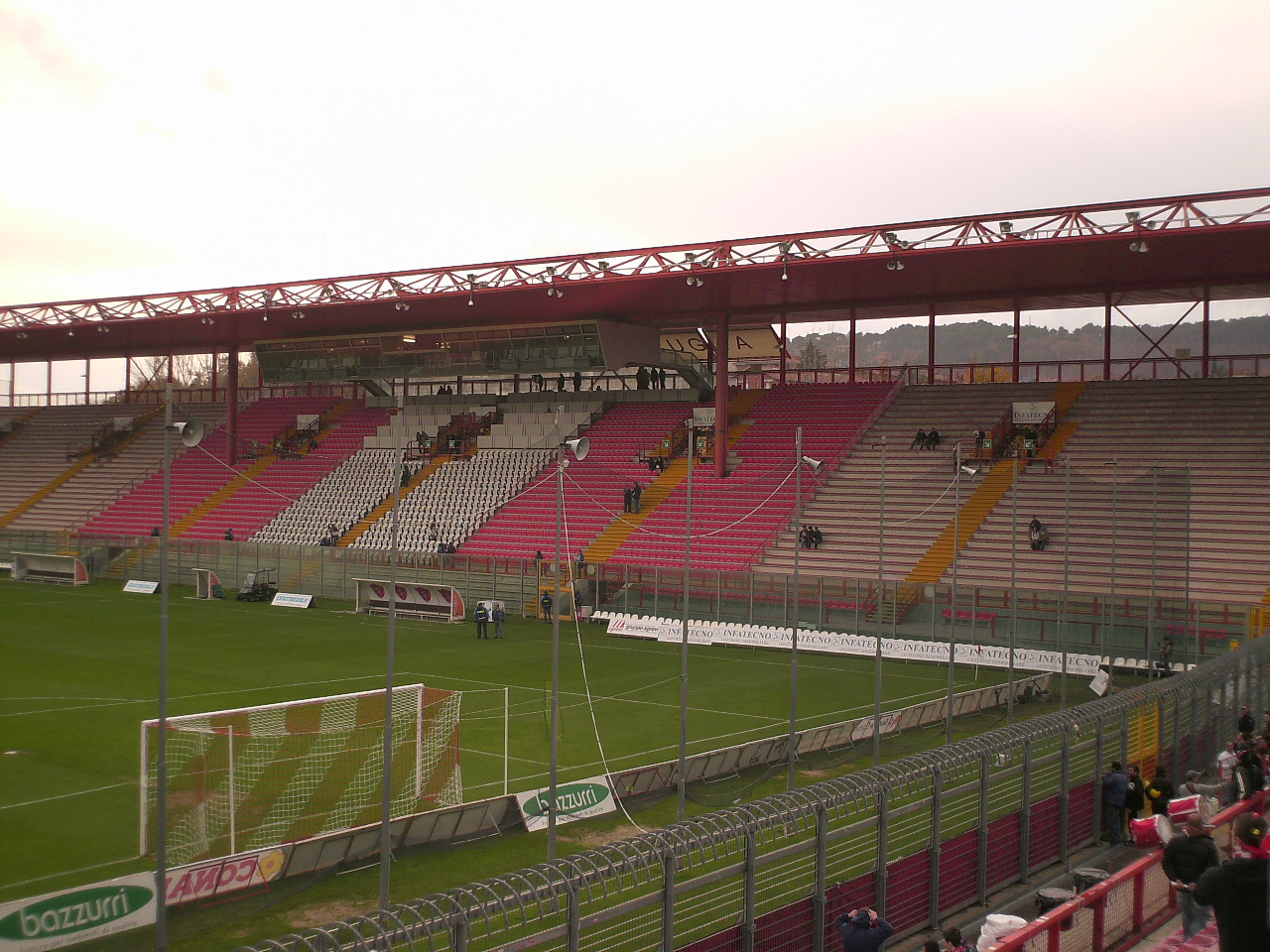
- Interactive map of Stadio Renato Curi
- Former names: Stadio Pian di Massiano (1975–1977)
- Location: Perugia, Italy
- Owner: Municipality of Perugia
- Capacity: 23,625
- Surface: Grass; 105x68m

Construction
- Groundbreaking: 1975
- Opened: 1975
- Architect: Luigi Corradi

Tenants
- A.C. Perugia Calcio; Italy national football team (selected matches)

The Stadio Renato Curi is a football stadium in the Italian city of Perugia.

It is home to A.C. Perugia Calcio. The stadium is named after Renato Curi (1953–1977), who died from a heart attack during a game against Juventus on 30 October 1977. Its capacity is 28,000 spectators.

== History ==
The stadium, designed by Luigi Corradi, was built in 1974 in only three months time in Pian di Massiano outside the old center of Perugia. The use of Stadio Santa Giuliana was considered too small after AC Perugia was promoted to the top tier of Italian soccer, the Serie A. Until renaming of Stadio Renato Curi in 1977 it was named Stadio Pian di Massiano.

== International matches ==
Five international matches of the Italy national football team have taken place at the Stadio Renato Curi:

Date	Match	Score	Stage	Attendance
22 December 1983	Italy – Cyprus	3–1	European Championship Qualifying match	20,773
22 December 1988	Italy – Scotland	2–0	Friendly match	26,000
9 October 1996	Italy – Georgia	1–0	World Cup Qualifying match	14,012
25 April 2001	Italy – South Africa	1–0	Friendly match	15,369
4 June 2014	Italy - Luxembourg	1–1	Friendly match	23,000
