= 1974–75 Serie B =

Italian football league season

Serie B
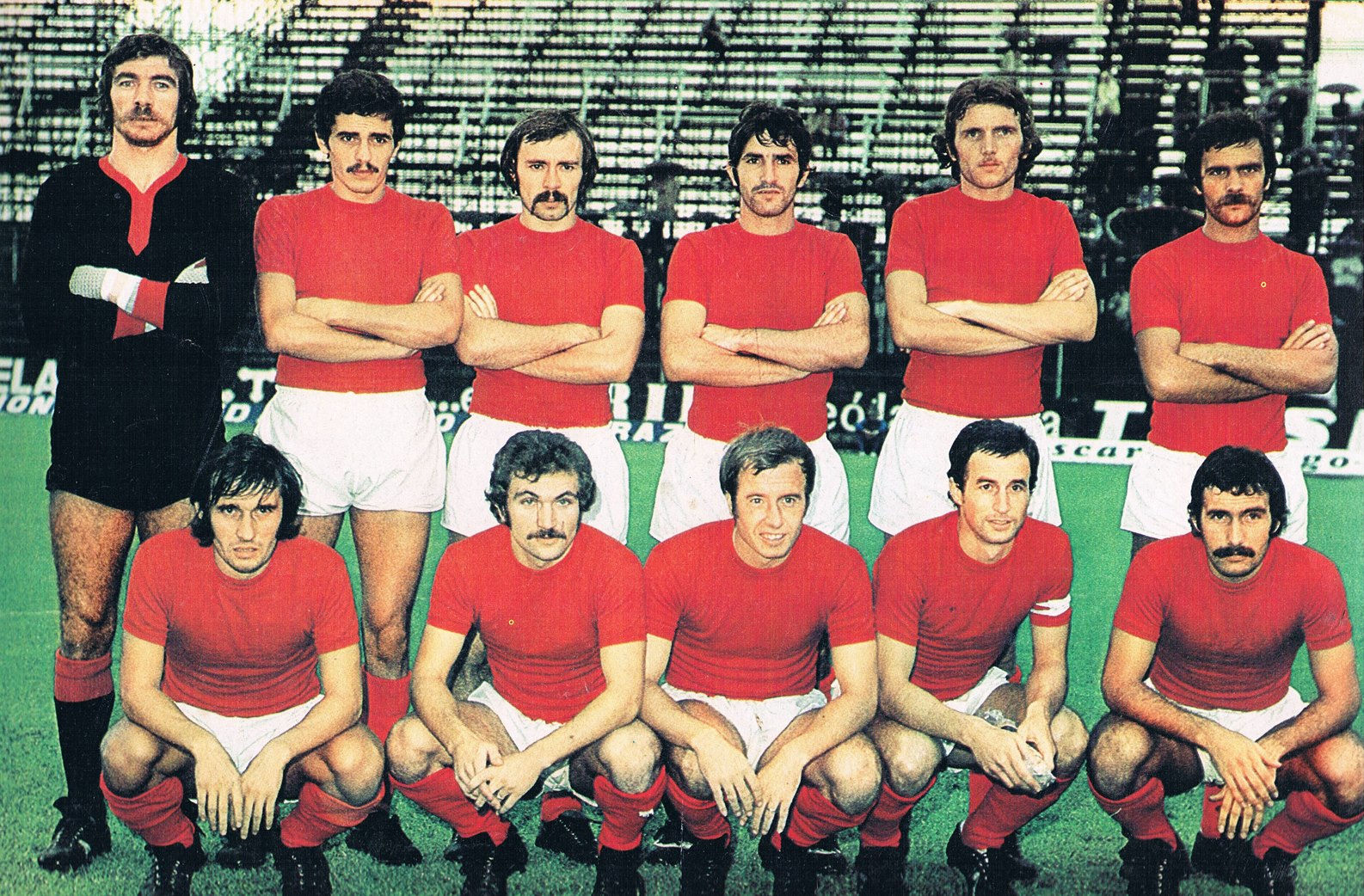
- 1974–75 Perugia squad
- Season: 1974–75
- Champions: Perugia; 1st title

1974–75 Serie B team distribution

The Serie B 1974–75 was the forty-third tournament of this competition played in Italy since its creation.

== Teams ==
Alessandria, Sambenedettese and Pescara had been promoted from Serie C, while Foggia, Genoa and Verona had been relegated from Serie A.

== Final classification ==
Pos	Team	Pld	W	D	L	GF	GA	GD	Pts	Promotion or relegation
1	Perugia (P, C)	38	17	15	6	44	27	+17	49	Promotion to Serie A
2	Como (P)	38	18	10	10	40	23	+17	46	Promotion to Serie A
3	Verona (P)	38	16	13	9	39	30	+9	45	Serie A after tie-breaker
4	Catanzaro	38	13	19	6	27	18	+9	45	Promotion tie-breaker
5	Palermo	38	13	17	8	31	25	+6	43	
6	Atalanta	38	14	11	13	37	36	+1	39	
7	Genoa	38	14	10	14	31	33	−2	38	
8	Foggia	38	10	18	10	31	35	−4	38	
9	Brescia	38	10	17	11	24	28	−4	37	
10	Pescara	38	9	18	11	37	38	−1	36	
11	Sambenedettese	38	13	10	15	36	43	−7	36	
12	Novara	38	10	15	13	30	33	−3	35	
13	S.P.A.L.	38	13	9	16	38	42	−4	35	
14	Brindisi	38	11	13	14	32	38	−6	35	
15	Taranto	38	10	15	13	24	34	−10	35	
16	Avellino (Note: Avellino saved for goal difference.)	38	11	12	15	33	29	+4	34	
17	Reggiana	38	9	16	13	33	36	−3	34	Relegation tie-breaker
18	Alessandria (R)	38	9	16	13	35	38	−3	34	Serie C after tie-breaker
19	Arezzo (R)	38	9	15	14	35	44	−9	33	Relegation to Serie C
20	Parma (Note: 3 points deducted.) (R)	38	9	15	14	30	37	−7	30	Relegation to Serie C

Source: Panini
(C) Champions; (P) Promoted; (R) Relegated

== Results ==
Home \ Away	ALE	ARE	ATA	AVE	BRE	BRI	CTZ	COM	FOG	GEN	NOV	PAL	PAR	PER	PES	REA	SBN	SPA	TAR	HEL
Alessandria		1–1	1–1	1–0	0–2	3–1	1–1	2–3	1–0	1–0	1–2	0–0	0–0	0–0	2–2	0–0	2–0	1–2	3–0	0–0
Arezzo	1–1		1–1	1–0	2–1	1–1	1–1	1–2	1–1	1–0	2–1	2–0	1–1	2–3	3–2	0–0	1–1	1–0	2–1	0–1
Atalanta	1–0	0–0		2–1	0–0	2–0	1–0	1–0	3–1	0–1	1–0	0–0	3–1	2–1	2–2	2–1	1–0	3–1	1–0	1–2
Avellino	2–0	4–1	2–0		2–0	4–1	0–0	1–0	2–0	1–0	0–1	0–1	3–1	0–1	1–1	0–1	1–0	1–2	0–0	1–2
Brescia	1–1	1–1	1–0	0–0		0–0	0–0	0–0	0–0	1–0	0–2	1–1	1–1	0–1	2–1	2–0	1–0	2–0	0–1	1–0
Brindisi	2–1	3–1	2–1	1–0	0–1		0–0	1–0	2–0	1–2	0–1	1–1	2–1	0–1	0–0	0–0	4–1	2–2	0–0	0–0
Catanzaro	3–2	1–0	1–0	1–0	0–1	0–0		1–0	1–1	2–0	1–0	1–0	1–1	2–0	1–0	1–1	0–0	2–1	1–1	0–0
Como	0–1	2–0	1–0	1–1	0–0	2–1	0–0		1–0	2–0	1–0	0–0	2–0	0–1	1–0	1–0	1–1	2–0	3–0	2–0
Foggia	3–3	1–1	3–1	1–1	1–1	1–0	2–1	3–2		1–0	0–0	0–0	3–0	0–0	1–0	1–1	2–1	2–0	1–1	1–0
Genoa	1–1	1–0	1–0	1–1	0–0	2–0	0–1	1–0	0–0		0–0	2–0	1–0	1–1	2–1	3–2	2–3	1–0	0–0	1–1
Novara	1–1	1–1	1–1	1–0	1–1	2–3	0–0	1–1	0–0	2–1		0–0	0–0	0–0	1–0	2–0	2–0	0–1	1–1	2–0
Palermo	2–1	1–0	1–1	2–0	1–0	0–1	0–0	1–0	1–0	0–0	1–1		1–0	0–0	1–0	2–0	3–1	2–0	0–0	1–2
Parma	0–0	1–0	1–2	0–0	2–0	2–0	0–0	1–1	0–0	2–1	1–1	2–1		1–1	1–1	1–1	2–0	2–0	2–1	0–1
Perugia	1–0	3–2	3–0	3–1	1–0	1–0	0–0	0–0	3–0	1–2	2–1	2–0	0–0		2–2	2–1	1–2	1–3	3–1	0–0
Pescara	0–0	1–1	1–1	1–1	1–1	0–1	2–1	1–0	2–0	1–0	1–0	1–1	1–1	1–1		0–0	1–0	2–1	2–0	2–1
Reggiana	2–0	1–0	1–1	0–0	0–0	2–0	1–1	1–2	3–0	0–1	1–0	2–2	1–0	1–1	2–2		3–0	2–1	0–0	0–1
Sambenedettese	1–0	1–1	1–1	0–0	2–0	2–1	0–1	0–1	0–0	2–1	2–0	1–0	2–1	0–0	2–1	3–0		2–2	1–0	1–0
SPAL	0–1	0–1	1–0	1–0	3–0	0–0	1–0	1–1	0–0	1–2	2–0	2–2	1–0	2–1	1–1	1–1	2–1		2–0	0–0
Taranto	1–2	0–0	1–0	0–0	1–0	1–1	0–0	0–2	1–0	3–0	1–0	1–2	2–0	0–0	2–0	1–0	0–0	1–0		1–1
Hellas Verona	1–0	2–0	1–0	0–2	2–2	0–0	1–0	1–3	1–1	0–0	5–2	0–0	1–0	0–2	0–0	2–1	4–2	2–1	4–0	

Source: Almanacco Illustrato del Calcio - La Storia 1898-2004, Panini Edizioni, Modena, September 2005 (in Italian)
Legend: Blue = home team win; Yellow = draw; Red = away team win.

== Tie-breakers ==
=== Promotion tie-breaker ===
Played in Terni

Team 1	Score	Team 2
Catanzaro (Italy)	0-1	(Italy) Verona

Verona promoted to Serie A.

=== Relegation tie-breaker ===
Played in Milan

Team 1	Score	Team 2
Alessandria (Italy)	1-2	(Italy) Reggiana

Alessandria relegated to Serie C.

== Attendances ==
#	Club	Average
1	Hellas	22,619
2	Genoa	18,840
3	Palermo	17,415
4	Atalanta	13,113
5	Pescara	12,484
6	Catanzaro	12,147
7	SPAL	11,241
8	Perugia	10,674
9	Taranto	10,343
10	Brescia	9,977
11	Foggia	9,901
12	Reggiana	9,036
13	Parma	8,105
14	Avellino	7,261
15	Sambenedettese	6,662
16	Alessandria	5,749
17	Como	5,398
18	Brindisi	5,368
19	Novara	5,005
20	Arezzo	4,392

== References and sources ==
- Almanacco Illustrato del Calcio - La Storia 1898-2004, Panini Edizioni, Modena, September 2005

Specific
