= AC Perugia Calcio =

Association football club based in Perugia, Italy

Coordinates: 43°6′22″N 12°21′26″E

Perugia
- Full name: Associazione Calcistica Perugia Calcio S.r.l.
- Nickname: I Grifoni (The Griffins)
- Founded: 1905; 121 years ago 1935; 91 years ago (refounded); 1940; 86 years ago (refounded); 2005; 21 years ago (refounded); 2010; 16 years ago (refounded)
- Stadium: Stadio Renato Curi
- Capacity: 20,000
- President: Javier Faroni
- Head coach: Aimo Diana
- League: Serie C Group B
- 2025–26: Serie C Group B, 14th of 20
- Website: www.acperugiacalcio.com
Home colours	Away colours	Third colours

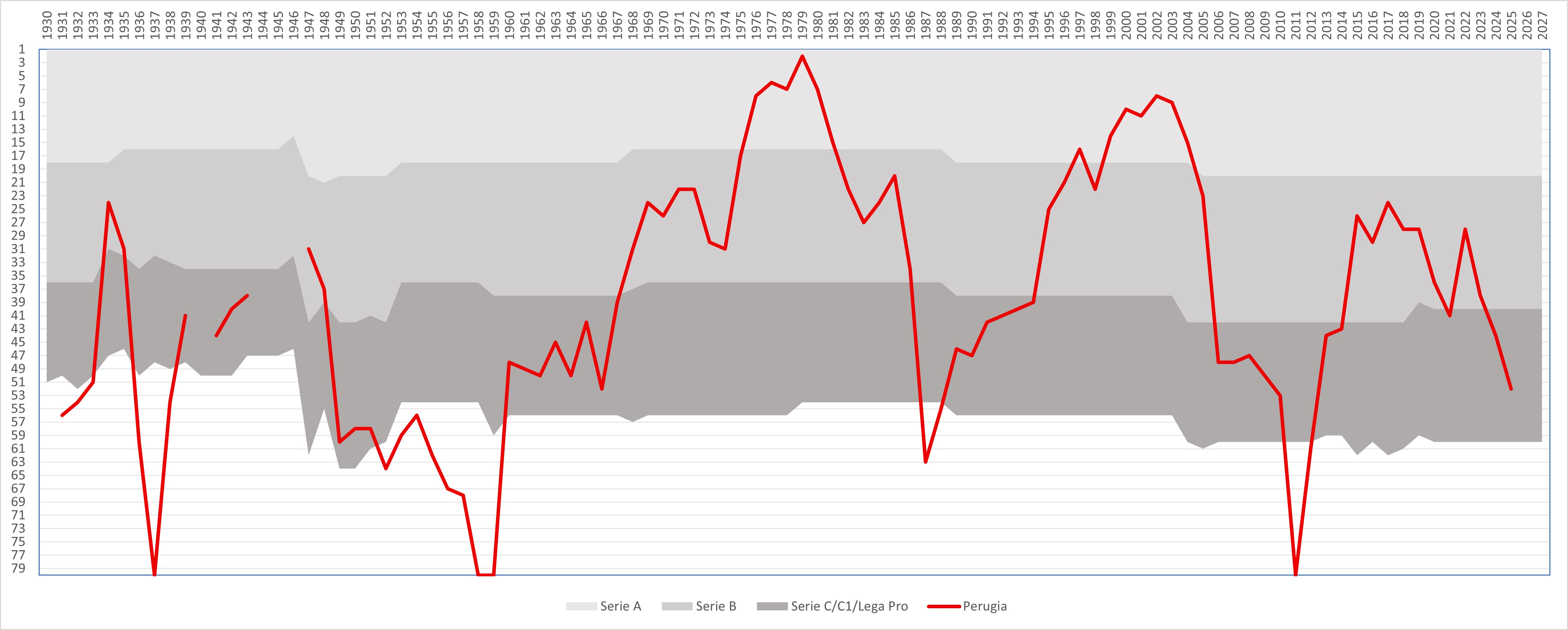
The performance of Perugia in the Italian football league structure since the first season of a unified Serie A (1929/30).

Associazione Calcistica Perugia Calcio, or simply Perugia, is a professional football club based in Perugia, Umbria, Italy, that competes in the Serie C Group B, the third division of Italian football.

Founded in 1905 as Associazione Calcistica Perugia, the club folded in 2005 and were re-founded the same year as Perugia Calcio, before dissolving once again in 2010, taking on its current name.

The club has played 13 times in the Serie A; their best placement was finishing as unbeaten runners-up in the 1978–79 season, becoming the first team under the round-robin format to finish a Serie A season without defeats. In addition to various minor league titles, the club has won the 2003 UEFA Intertoto Cup, and has made two UEFA Cup appearances. In its Serie A spell under club president Luciano Gaucci around the turn of the century Perugia had some upset wins at home, most notably against Juventus on the final day in 2000, which led to their opponents dropping the title win to Lazio. Gaucci's era ended with relegation in 2004 after which bankruptcy unfolded.

The club's players are nicknamed "biancorossi" (red and whites) due to their historical kit colours, which include red shirts and socks accompanied by white shorts, and "grifoni" (griffins), inspired by their city's heraldic symbol. They play their home matches at the 28,000-capacity Stadio Renato Curi. In the 1979–80 season, they became the first Italian football team to show a kit sponsorship.

== History ==
=== A.C. Perugia (early years) ===
A.C. Perugia were founded on 9 June 1905, after the merger of U.S. Fortebraccio and Libertas. During the early 1900s, the club primarily engaged in regional competitions. Throughout the 1930s, Perugia experienced significant growth, culminating in its inaugural promotion to Serie B in 1933. Notably, in 1937, Perugia constructed its first official stadium, Santa Giuliana. After a second promotion to Serie B in the season 1945–46, Perugia spent almost all of the 1950s in the lower divisions.

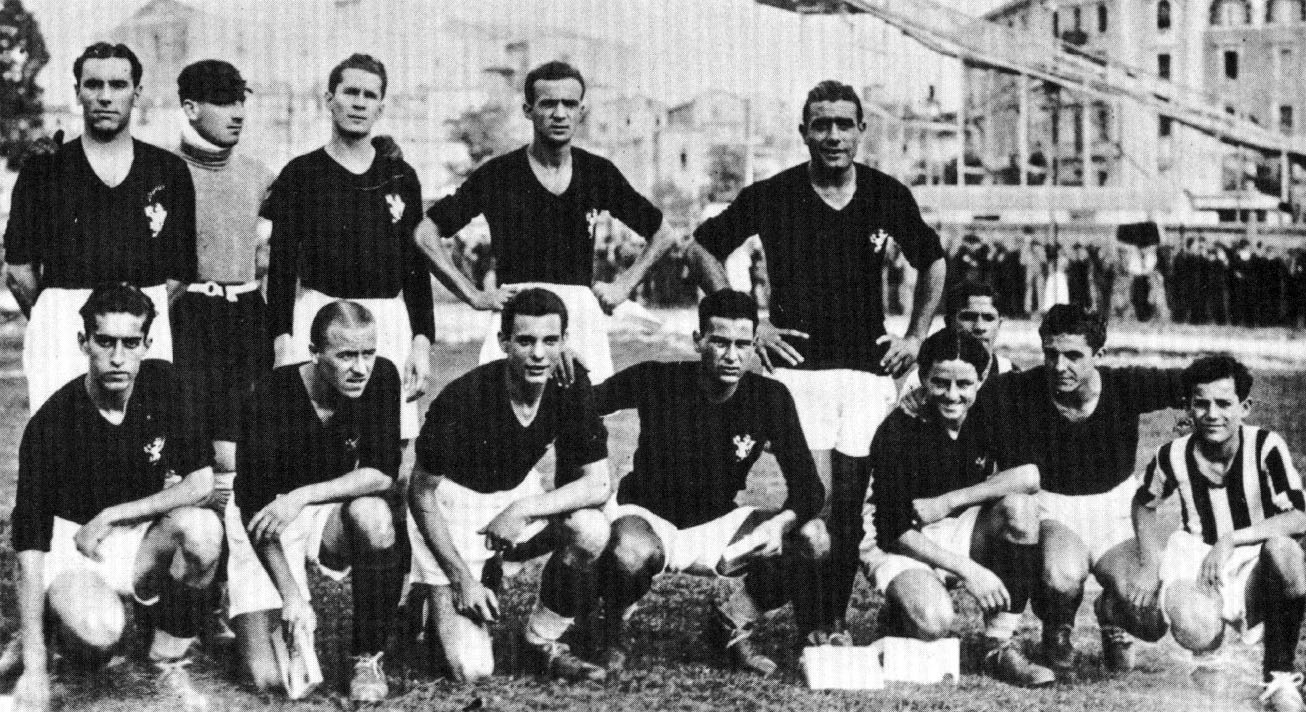
1933–34 Perugia line-up

=== A.C. Perugia (1960s–1975) ===
The 1960s marked a resurgence for Perugia, under the presidency of prominent local entrepreneur Lino Spagnoli. The promotion to Serie B in the 1966–1967 season would mark the beginning of one of the club's most successful periods. Perugia spent the next eight years in Serie B before promotion to Serie A for the first time in 1975. The society underwent profound renewal, with the arrival of Apulian entrepreneur Franco D'Attoma as president and with a new technical and managerial staff, including Ilario Castagner, a former player for the team in the early part of the previous decade, as coach, and Silvano Ramaccioni as sporting director. Several new players joined the team, including defender Pierluigi Frosio, midfielders Franco Vannini and Renato Curi, and forward Paolo Sollier. Sollier gained attention beyond football circles and was known for using a clenched fist salute on the pitch. Perugia secured promotion to Serie A with a three-point lead over Como and a four-point lead over Verona.

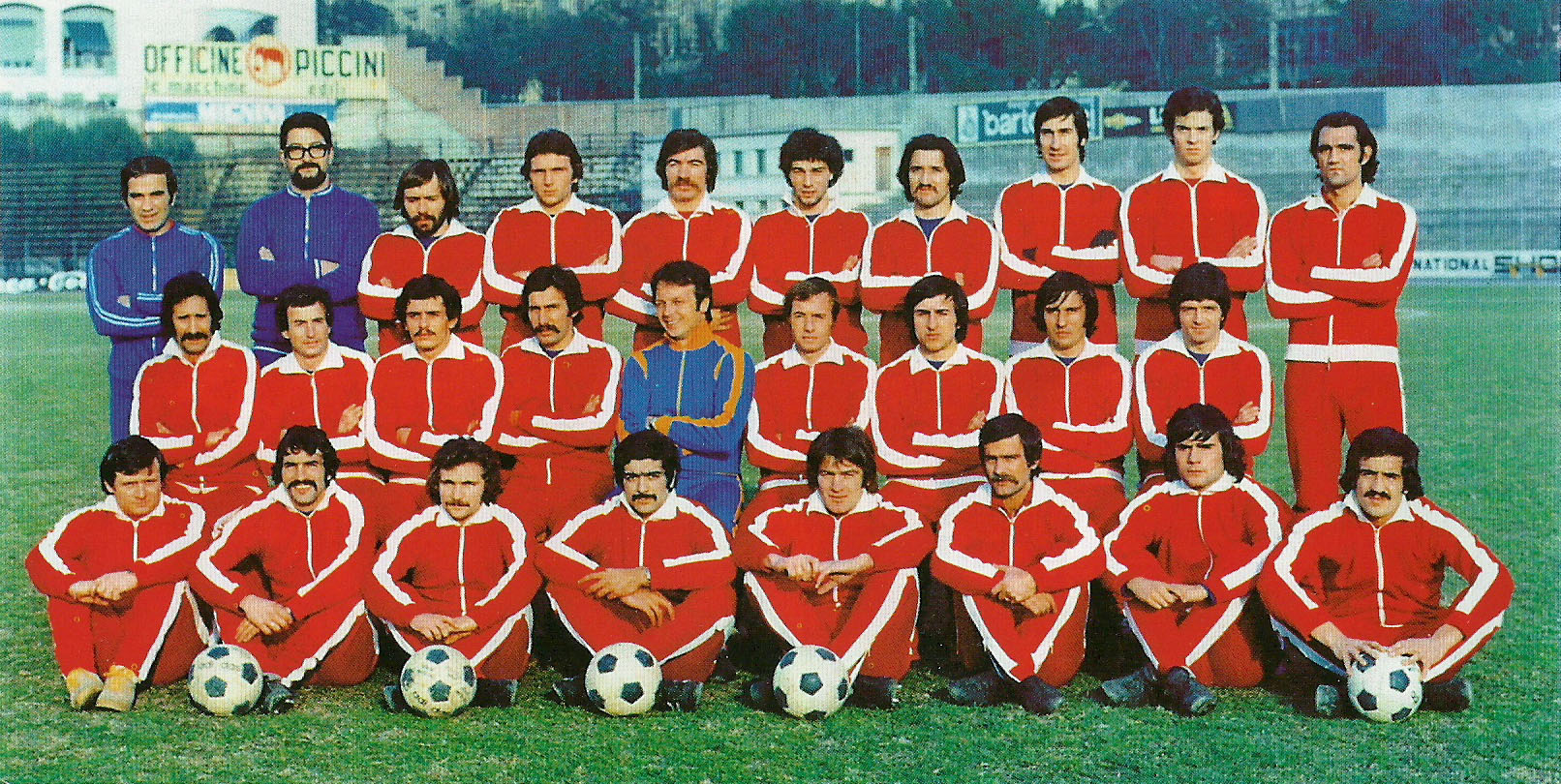
1974–75 Perugia first-team squad

=== A.C. Perugia (D'Attoma years) ===
The newly promoted Perugia, competing in the new Comunale di Pian di Massiano stadium, embarked on its inaugural Serie A campaign, retaining much of the squad from the previous season. Their debut match in Serie A was against Milan on October 5, 1975.

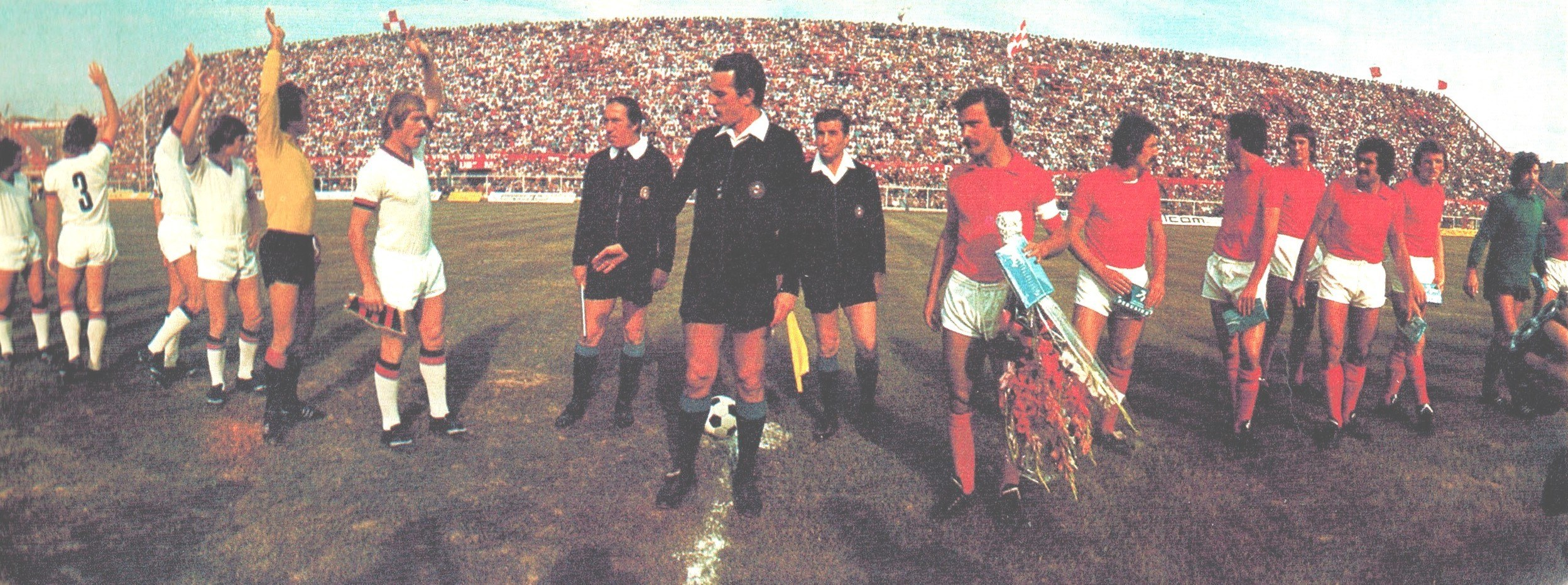
Serie A 1975–76 AC Perugia vs AC Milan

On May 16, 1976, Renato Curi – who played a pivotal role in Perugia's journey to Serie A – scored the decisive goal in the Perugia-Juventus match, sealing Torino's victory in the championship against Juventus. Additionally, Perugia made its debut in European competitions during that season, participating in the Mitropa Cup. Curi's performances and goals were crucial in securing Perugia's commendable sixth-place finish in the following season, making them the highest-ranked team excluded from UEFA qualification. Tragically, the talented Curi died on October 30, 1977, from a heart attack during a home match against Juventus, leaving a lasting impact on the club and leading to the stadium's renaming in his honor.

Despite this loss, Perugia continued to excel. The following season, they made history by becoming the first team to complete a Serie A campaign undefeated, finishing runners-up in 1979 with 11 wins and 19 draws, resulting in the only unbeaten side not to win a title. Perugia's unbeaten record in the Serie A lasted for 37 matches from April 1978 until October 1979. Led by Castagner, the team's cohesive performance saw them finish second in the league standings behind AC Milan, earning widespread admiration as the "Perugia of miracles." Among the key figures in their ranks were captain Pierluigi Frosio, along with Franco Vannini, Antonio Ceccarini, and Salvatore Bagni.

Ahead of the 1979–80 season, Perugia ambitiously signed Italy national team striker Paolo Rossi from L.R. Vicenza. Also notable was President D'Attoma's pioneering commercial deal with the Ponte pasta factory, which marked the first instance of a kit sponsorship for an Italian football team, setting a precedent in the history of Italian football.

Despite Rossi's performance as a goal scorer, the team couldn't replicate their previous success, seeming overwhelmed by newfound fame. Perugia struggled in the league and their first UEFA Cup appearance ended early in the round of 16 against Aris Thessaloniki. The ongoing absence of a key midfielder like Vannini, who later retired due to injury, further hindered their season.

However, as the club appeared to have solidified its position in Italian football, an unexpected turn of events occurred. In March 1980, the Totonero scandal erupted, implicating Rossi himself and indirectly impacting Perugia's fate. The team collapsed, finishing the season in a nondescript seventh place and was penalized five points in the following season, which ultimately led to relegation in 1981.

=== A.C. Perugia (1980s) ===
The club spent the first half of the 1980s trying to get back to Serie A, nearly succeeding under the management of Aldo Agroppi in the 1984–1985 season, narrowly missing promotion back to Serie A by just one point, setting records for the fewest defeats (1) and most draws (26 out of 38 matches) in the Serie B, a sign of potential resurgence. However, the club's decline continued, culminating in a double relegation to Serie C2 in 1986 due to their involvement in the 1986 Totonero scandal, despite already facing relegation on the pitch. It was during this time that Fabrizio Ravanelli would be discovered, he would later go on to a career with Reggiana, Juventus, Middlesbrough and several other clubs before returning to Perugia.

=== A.C. Perugia (Gaucci years) ===
In 1991, the entrepreneur and sportsman Luciano Gaucci took control of the club. His impactful legacy with the team endured until 2005, characterized by notable moments, including the contentious attempt to recruit the first female footballer for a male Serie A side, an unexpected victory against championship contender Juventus in 2000, and the triumph in the Intertoto Cup in 2003.

Gaucci, known for his unconventional methods of dealing with players, coaches, and journalists, expressed his determination to swiftly return the Biancorossi to the top flight, a goal he achieved within five years. To accomplish this, Gaucci initiated significant transfer campaigns in the early 1990s, making notable signings such as Giuseppe Dossena and Giovanni Cornacchini. Despite narrowly missing promotion in the 1991–1992 season, Perugia secured promotion to Serie B the following year after defeating Acireale in a playoff match. However, the joy was short-lived as Gaucci was embroiled in a scandal involving a gift of a horse to the family of a favorable referee, leading to the denial of Serie B promotion by the Italian Football Federation. Nevertheless, the 1993–1994 season saw Perugia, led by Ilario Castagner, dominate their group and earn promotion to Serie B, with Cornacchini clinching the top scorer title for the second consecutive year. The team's stay in Serie B lasted only two seasons, as they achieved promotion to Serie A in the 1995–1996 season under the guidance of Giovanni Galeone. Led by captain Federico Giunti and striker Marco Negri, Perugia secured promotion with a dramatic victory over Verona, ultimately sealing their return to the top flight after a fifteen-year absence.

Perugia started well before Gaucci's decision to replace Galeone with Nevio Scala. The side's form subsequently declined before a late rally gave them a chance of survival- a 2–1 defeat at Piacenza in the final round ultimately determined relegation by tie-breaker rules due to finishing level on points. With Castagner back in charge, Perugia won a play-off with Torino to secure a return to the top flight.

The next six seasons saw Perugia hold their own in Serie A with foreign imports including the Japanese international Hidetoshi Nakata in 1998 and the Ecuadorian top goal scorer Ivan Kaviedes. The team came under scrutiny when Gaucci criticised and eventually terminated the contract of his own player, Ahn Jung-Hwan of South Korea, for scoring the golden goal that knocked Italy out of the 2002 FIFA World Cup, and allegedly insulting the Italian nation. Ahn's national manager Guus Hiddink spoke out against the sacking.

In the summer of 2003, Perugia signed English striker Jay Bothroyd, and Al-Saadi Gaddafi (the son of Libyan dictator Muammar Gaddafi). Soon after, the club were one of three winners of the 2003 UEFA Intertoto Cup after beating VfL Wolfsburg of Germany 3–0 on aggregate. This qualified the team to the 2003–04 UEFA Cup, in which they were eliminated in the third round by PSV Eindhoven.

=== Perugia Calcio (2005–2010) ===
The new chairman Vincenzo Silvestrini had re-established the club in 2005 as Perugia Calcio.

After a takeover, in 2009 Perugia Calcio property passed to Perugian entrepreneur and former Pisa owner and chairman Leonardo Covarelli. On 21 May 2010 the Court of Perugia declared the bankruptcy of Perugia Calcio srl. Nobody decided to take over the society at the subsequent auction and on 30 June 2010 the club was unable to join the Italian third level championship 2010–2011. The Italian Football Federation decided on 8 July 2010 to revoke the affiliation of the bankrupt Perugia Calcio Srl.

=== A.C. Perugia Calcio (2010–present) ===
In July 2010, a new club with the same denomination as ASD Perugia Calcio and inheriting the old side history, was entered into the Serie D with local entrepreneur Roberto Damaschi as chairman.

On 10 April 2011, Perugia became the first team of the season to get promoted from Serie D to the Lega Pro Seconda Divisione 2011–12, after a 3–2 home victory against Castel Rigone. The club also won the 2010–11 Coppa Italia Serie D, beating Turris 1–0 in the final.

In summer 2011 the club was renamed Associazione Calcistica Perugia Calcio, to play in the Lega Pro Seconda Divisione/B obtaining immediate promotion to Lega Pro Prima Divisione. On 4 May 2014, beating Frosinone 1–0, AC Perugia won the 2013–14 Lega Pro Prima Divisione championship and gained promotion to Serie B after a 9-year absence from Italy's second highest football division. Additionally, Roman entrepreneur Massimiliano Santopadre acquired full ownership of the club's shares.

On 2 May 2021, Perugia finished in first place in group B of the 2020–21 Serie C, and were promoted back to the Serie B. Their promotion came after consecutive wins in the last five games on the season, having been in third place, six points from first place. The club was relegated back to Serie C at the end of the 2022–23 Serie B season.

== Recent seasons ==
Season	Division	Tier	Pos	Pl	W	D	L	+	–	P	Cup	Note
2016–17	Serie B	II	4	42	15	20	7	54	40	65	4th round	Eliminated in the Promotion play-offs semifinals to Benevento
2017–18	Serie B	II	8	42	16	12	14	67	58	60	4th round	Eliminated in the Promotion play-offs quarterfinals to Venezia
2018–19	Serie B	II	8	36	14	8	14	49	49	50	2nd round	Eliminated in the Promotion play-offs quarterfinals to Hellas Verona
2019–20	Serie B	II	↓ 16	38	12	9	17	38	49	45	Round of 16	Relegated to Serie C after losing to Pescara in the relegation play-out
2020–21	Serie C (Group B)	III	↑ 1	38	23	10	5	67	30	79	3rd round	Promoted to Serie B
2021–22	Serie B	II	8	38	14	16	8	40	32	58	1st round	Eliminated in the Promotion play-offs quarterfinals to Brescia
2022–23	Serie B	II	↓ 18	38	10	9	19	40	52	39	1st round	Relegated to Serie C
2023–24	Serie C (Group B)	III	4	38	17	12	9	44	35	63	–	Eliminated in the Promotion play-offs 1/16-finals to Carrarese
2024–25	Serie C (Group B)	III	12	38	11	14	13	43	41	47	–	
2025–26	Serie C (Group B)	III	14	38	8	14	14	38	44	38	–	

== Players ==
=== Current squad ===
As of 31 August 2026

Note: Flags indicate national team as defined under FIFA eligibility rules; some limited exceptions apply. Players may hold more than one non-FIFA nationality.

No.	Pos.	Nation	Player
1	GK	POL	Radosław Żelezny (on loan from Roma)
3	DF	ITA	Moustapha Yabre
4	DF	ITA	Alessandro Tozzuolo
5	DF	ITA	Diego Stramaccioni
6	DF	ITA	Matteo Angeli
7	MF	ITA	Andrea Cisco (on loan from Union Brescia)
8	MF	ITA	Riccardo Ladinetti
9	FW	ITA	Antonio Sabbatani
10	FW	ITA	Luigi Canotto
11	DF	ERI	Matteo Borsoi
12	GK	ITA	Luca Moro
14	DF	ITA	Ettore Quirini (on loan from Salernitana)
15	DF	BUL	Dimitar Papazov (on loan from Bologna)
16	MF	ITA	Paolo Bartolomei
19	MF	ITA	Christian Dottori
20	MF	ITA	Giuseppe Carriero

No.	Pos.	Nation	Player
21	MF	ITA	Giorgio Tumbarello
23	MF	LTU	Linas Mėgelaitis (captain)
26	FW	FRA	Sayha Seha (on loan from Catanzaro)
28	DF	ITA	Davide Riccardi
31	MF	ITA	Gabriele Conti
33	MF	ITA	Christian Langella
39	DF	ITA	Giacomo Cavallini
55	GK	ITA	Sebastian Strappini
71	DF	ITA	Pietro Rondolini
72	MF	ITA	Matteo Cortesi (on loan from Arezzo)
77	MF	ALB	Elvis Kabashi
—	GK	ITA	Ruben Rinaldini
—	DF	ITA	Guillaume Renault
—	MF	FRA	Sayha Seha
—	FW	NED	Pelle van Amersfoort

=== Out on loan ===
Note: Flags indicate national team as defined under FIFA eligibility rules; some limited exceptions apply. Players may hold more than one non-FIFA nationality.

No.	Pos.	Nation	Player
—	GK	ITA	Francesco Yimga (at Real Aversa until 30 June 2027)
—	DF	ITA	Nicholas Belloni (at San Donato Tavarnelle until 30 June 2027)
—	DF	ITA	Filippo Cottini (at Angelana until 30 June 2027)

No.	Pos.	Nation	Player
—	DF	ITA	Matteo Giorgetti (at Foligno until 30 June 2027)
—	MF	ITA	Francesco Berta (at Recanatese until 30 June 2027)

== Coaching staff ==
As of 26 September 2026

Position	Name
Head coach	(Italy) Aimo Diana
Assistant coach	(Italy) Emanuele Filippini
Goalkeeper coach	(Italy) Giovanni Vecchini
Athletic coach	(Argentina) Esteban Gabriel Jesus Anitua
Match analyst	(Italy) Alessandro Belleri
Rehab coach	(Italy) Matteo Valeri
Youth academy director	(Italy) Giovanni D'Andrea
Chief doctor	(Italy) Giuliano Cerulli

== Honours ==
=== League ===
- Serie A
  - Runners-up: 1978–79
- Serie B
  - Winner: 1974–75
- Serie C1
  - Winner: 1932–33, 1966–67, 1993–94, 2013–14, 2020–21
- Serie C2
  - Winner: 1987–88, 2011–12

=== Cups ===
- Supercoppa di Lega Pro
  - Winner: 2014
- Supercoppa di Serie C2
  - Winner: 2012
- Coppa Italia Serie D
  - Winner: 2010–11

=== European ===
- UEFA Intertoto Cup
  - Winner: 2003

== Divisional movements ==
Division movement per season
Series	Years	Last	Promotions	Relegations
A	13	2003–04	–	▼3 (1981, 1997, 2004)
B	29	2022–23	▲3 (1975, 1996, 1998)	▼6 (1935✟, 1948, 1986⇊, 2005✟, 2020, 2022–23)
C +C2	33 +3	2023–24	▲6 (1933, 1946, 1967, 1994, 2014, 2021) ▲2 (1988 C2, 2012 C2)	▼3 (1939, 1951, 2010✟)
78 out of 92 years of professional football in Italy since 1929
D	13	2010–11	▲4 (1938, 1940, 1959, 2011)	never
E	1	1929–30	▲1 (1930⇈)	never

== Records ==
- Serie A:
  - Runners-up and unbeaten: 1978–79

== European record ==
=== UEFA Cup ===
Season	Round	Club	Home	Away	Aggregate	Reference
1979–80	First Round	(Socialist Federal Republic of Yugoslavia) Dinamo Zagreb	1–0	0–0	1–0	
1979–80	Second Round	(Greece) Aris	0–3	1–1	1–4	
2003–04	First Round	(Scotland) Dundee	1–0	2–1	3–1	
2003–04	Second Round	(Greece) Aris	2–0	1–1	3–1	
2003–04	Third Round	(Netherlands) PSV Eindhoven	0–0	1–3	1–3	

=== UEFA Intertoto Cup ===
Season	Round	Club	Home	Away	Aggregate	Reference
1999	Second Round	(North Macedonia) Pobeda	1–0	0–0	1–0	
1999	Third Round	(Turkey) Trabzonspor	0–3 (f)	2–1	2–4	
2000	Second Round	(Belgium) Standard Liège	1–2	1–1	2–3	
2002	Third Round	(Germany) Stuttgart	2–1	1–3	3–4	
2003	Third Round	(Finland) Allianssi	2–0	2–0	4–0	
2003	Semi-final	(France) Nantes	0–0	1–0	1–0	
2003	Final	(Germany) Wolfsburg	1–0	2–0	3–0	
