= 1978–79 Serie A =

76th season of top-tier Italian football

Serie A
- Season: 1978–79
- Dates: 1 October 1978 – 13 May 1979
- Champions: Milan; 10th title
- Relegated: Vicenza; Atalanta; Hellas Verona
- European Cup: Milan
- Cup Winners' Cup: Juventus
- UEFA Cup: Perugia; Internazionale; Napoli; Torino
- Matches: 240
- Goals: 455 (1.9 per match)
- Top goalscorer: Bruno Giordano (19 goals)

Serie A 1978-79 team distribution

The 1978–79 Serie A season was won by Milan. Notably, Perugia were the first team during the round-robin era to go through the season undefeated, although due to their number of drawn matches, they finished second in the league.

== Teams ==
Ascoli, Catanzaro and Avellino had been promoted from Serie B.

== League table ==
Pos	Team	Pld	W	D	L	GF	GA	GD	Pts	Qualification or relegation
1	Milan (C)	30	17	10	3	46	19	+27	44	Qualification to European Cup
2	Perugia	30	11	19	0	34	16	+18	41	Qualification to UEFA Cup
3	Juventus	30	12	13	5	40	23	+17	37	Qualification to Cup Winners' Cup
4	Internazionale	30	10	16	4	38	24	+14	36	Qualification to UEFA Cup
5	Torino	30	11	14	5	35	23	+12	36	Qualification to UEFA Cup
6	Napoli	30	9	14	7	23	21	+2	32	Qualification to UEFA Cup
7	Fiorentina	30	10	12	8	26	26	0	32	
8	Lazio	30	9	11	10	35	40	−5	29	
9	Catanzaro	30	6	16	8	23	30	−7	28	
10	Ascoli	30	7	12	11	26	31	−5	26	
11	Avellino	30	6	14	10	19	26	−7	26	
12	Roma	30	8	10	12	24	32	−8	26	
13	Bologna	30	4	16	10	23	30	−7	24	
14	Vicenza (R)	30	5	14	11	29	42	−13	24	Relegation to Serie B
15	Atalanta (R)	30	6	12	12	20	33	−13	24	Relegation to Serie B
16	Hellas Verona (R)	30	2	11	17	14	39	−25	15	Relegation to Serie B

Source: Panini
(C) Champions; (R) Relegated

== Results ==
Home \ Away	ASC	ATA	AVE	BOL	CAT	FIO	INT	JUV	LRV	LAZ	MIL	NAP	PER	ROM	TOR	VER
Ascoli	—	1–0	2–0	2–2	1–1	2–1	1–2	1–0	0–0	0–0	0–1	0–0	0–0	0–0	3–0	1–0
Atalanta	3–2	—	0–0	0–0	0–2	0–0	0–1	0–1	2–0	0–0	1–3	2–1	0–2	2–0	0–1	1–0
Avellino	3–1	0–0	—	0–0	0–0	1–1	1–0	0–0	2–1	1–3	1–0	1–1	0–1	0–0	1–1	2–0
Bologna	0–0	1–0	0–0	—	1–1	0–0	0–1	0–0	5–2	2–1	0–1	1–1	2–2	1–2	1–1	1–0
Catanzaro	1–1	0–0	0–0	0–0	—	0–0	1–1	0–0	2–0	3–1	1–3	0–0	1–1	1–0	2–1	1–1
Fiorentina	1–0	0–1	1–0	1–0	1–1	—	1–2	0–1	0–0	3–0	2–3	2–1	1–1	2–0	0–0	1–0
Internazionale	1–1	2–2	2–0	0–0	0–0	1–2	—	2–1	0–0	4–0	2–2	2–0	1–1	1–2	0–0	4–0
Juventus	1–0	3–0	3–3	1–1	3–1	1–1	1–1	—	1–2	2–1	1–0	1–0	1–2	4–1	1–1	6–2
Vicenza	1–1	1–1	2–1	2–2	2–0	0–1	0–1	1–1	—	4–1	2–3	0–0	1–1	1–0	2–2	0–0
Lazio	3–1	1–1	0–0	1–0	3–1	4–0	1–1	2–2	4–3	—	1–1	1–2	0–0	0–0	0–0	1–0
Milan	0–0	1–1	1–0	0–0	4–0	4–1	1–0	0–0	0–0	2–0	—	0–1	1–1	1–0	1–0	2–1
Napoli	2–1	2–0	3–0	2–1	1–0	0–0	0–0	0–0	2–2	0–2	1–1	—	1–1	1–0	0–1	1–0
Perugia	2–0	2–0	0–0	3–1	1–0	1–0	2–2	0–0	2–0	2–0	1–1	2–0	—	1–1	0–0	1–1
Roma	1–0	2–2	2–1	2–0	1–3	1–1	1–1	1–0	3–0	1–2	0–3	0–0	0–0	—	0–2	2–0
Torino	3–1	3–0	1–0	3–1	3–0	1–1	3–3	0–1	4–0	2–2	0–3	0–0	0–0	1–0	—	0–0
Hellas Verona	2–3	1–1	0–1	1–0	0–0	0–1	0–0	0–3	0–0	2–0	1–3	0–0	1–1	1–1	0–1	—

Legend: Blue = home team win; Yellow = draw; Red = away team win.

== Top goalscorers ==
Rank	Player	Club	Goals
1	(Italy) Bruno Giordano	Lazio	19
2	(Italy) Paolo Rossi	Vicenza	15
3	(Italy) Alberto Bigon	Milan	12
4	(Italy) Alessandro Altobelli	Internazionale	11
4	(Italy) Carlo Muraro	Internazionale	11
6	(Italy) Massimo Palanca	Catanzaro	10
6	(Italy) Paolo Pulici	Torino	10
8	(Italy) Roberto Bettega	Juventus	9
8	(Italy) Aldo Maldera	Milan	9
8	(Italy) Roberto Pruzzo	Roma	9
8	(Italy) Giuseppe Savoldi	Napoli	9
8	(Italy) Walter Speggiorin	Perugia	9
8	(Italy) Francesco Graziani	Torino	9

== Attendances ==
#	Club	Average
1	Napoli	59,359
2	Roma	48,768
3	Milan	48,358
4	Lazio	41,059
5	Fiorentina	40,911
6	Internazionale	36,544
7	Juventus	35,410
8	Torino	33,818
9	Bologna	31,429
10	Avellino	25,055
11	Ascoli	23,523
12	Vicenza	23,010
13	Atalanta	22,848
14	Perugia	20,984
15	Hellas Verona	17,504
16	Catanzaro	17,146

== References and sources ==
- Almanacco Illustrato del Calcio - La Storia 1898-2004, Panini Edizioni, Modena, September 2005
