= List of AC Milan players =

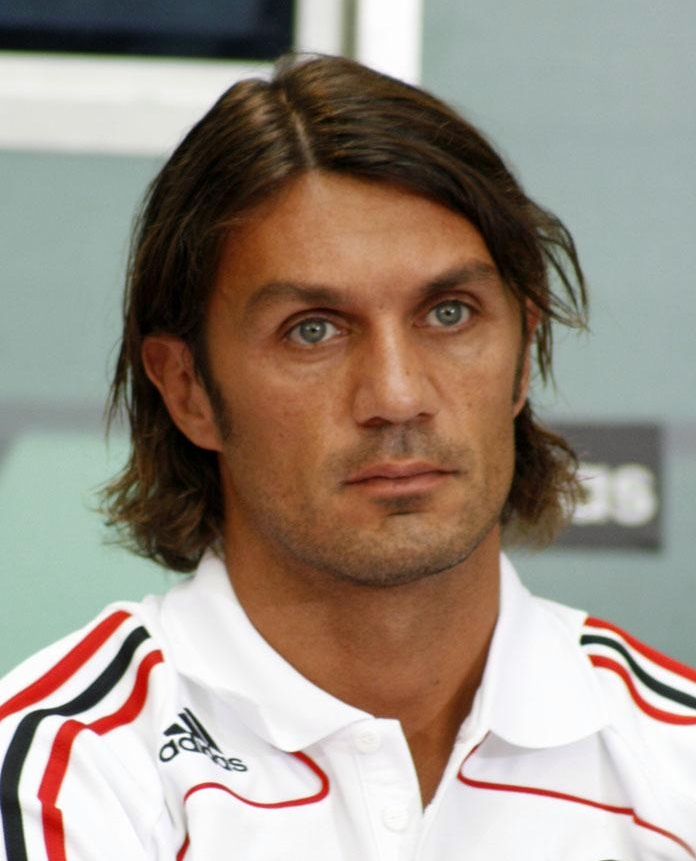
Paolo Maldini is Milan's all-time record appearance-maker.

Associazione Calcio Milan is an Italian professional football club based in Milan. The club was founded in December 1899 as Milan Foot-Ball and Cricket Club, and played their first competitive match on 15 April 1900, when they entered the semi-final of the 1900 Italian Football Championship. Since playing their first competitive match, more than 900 players have made a competitive first-team appearance for the club, of whom over 150 players have made at least 100 appearances (including substitute appearances); those players are listed here.

Milan's record appearance-maker is Paolo Maldini, who made 902 appearances over his 25 seasons at the club from 1985 to 2009. Gunnar Nordahl is the club's top goalscorer with 221 goals in 268 appearances. Four other players have made more than 500 appearances: Franco Baresi (719), Alessandro Costacurta (663), Gianni Rivera (658) and Mauro Tassotti (583). Nordahl is the only player to have scored over 200 goals for Milan, while nine more players have scored at least 100.

== List of players ==
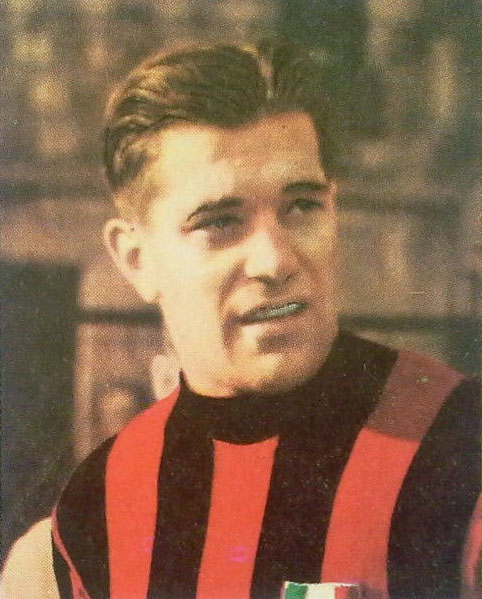
Swedish forward Gunnar Nordahl is Milan's all-time top goalscorer.

- Appearances and goals are for first-team competitive matches only, including domestic league (Serie A, Serie B, Divisione Nazionale, Prima Divisione, Prima Categoria), domestic cup (Coppa Italia, Supercoppa Italiana, Torneo Estivo del 1986) UEFA competition (European Cup/Champions League, UEFA Cup/Europa League, Cup Winners' Cup, Super Cup, Intercontinental Cup), pre-UEFA European competition (Latin Cup, Inter-Cities Fairs Cup, Mitropa Cup, Coppa dell'Amicizia, Cup of the Alps) and FIFA Club World Cup matches; wartime matches are regarded as unofficial and are excluded.
- Players are listed according to the date of their first team debut for the club.

Statistics correct as of match played 22 November 2026

Table headers

- Nationality – If a player played international football, the country or countries he played for are shown. Otherwise, the player's nationality is given as his citizenship of birth (or the corresponding one at the time they played for Milan).
- Milan career – The year of the player's first appearance for Milan to the year of his last appearance.

Positions key
Pre-1960s		Post-1960s	
GK	Goalkeeper		
FB	Full back	DF	Defender
HB	Half back	MF	Midfielder
FW	Forward		
U	Utility player (Note: A utility player is one who is considered to play in more than one position.)		

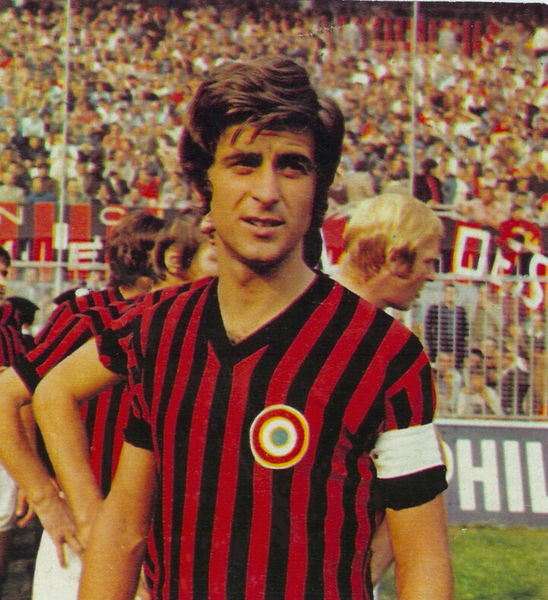
Gianni Rivera was the first player to make more than 500 appearances for the club, reaching 658 when he retired.

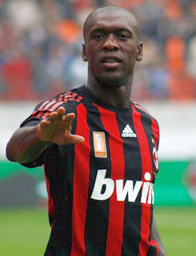
Dutch midfielder Clarence Seedorf is Milan's record appearance-maker among foreign players.

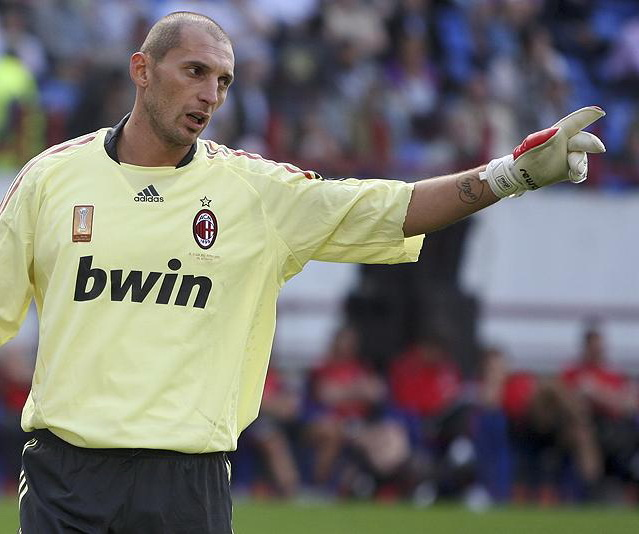
Christian Abbiati has made more appearances for Milan than any other goalkeeper.

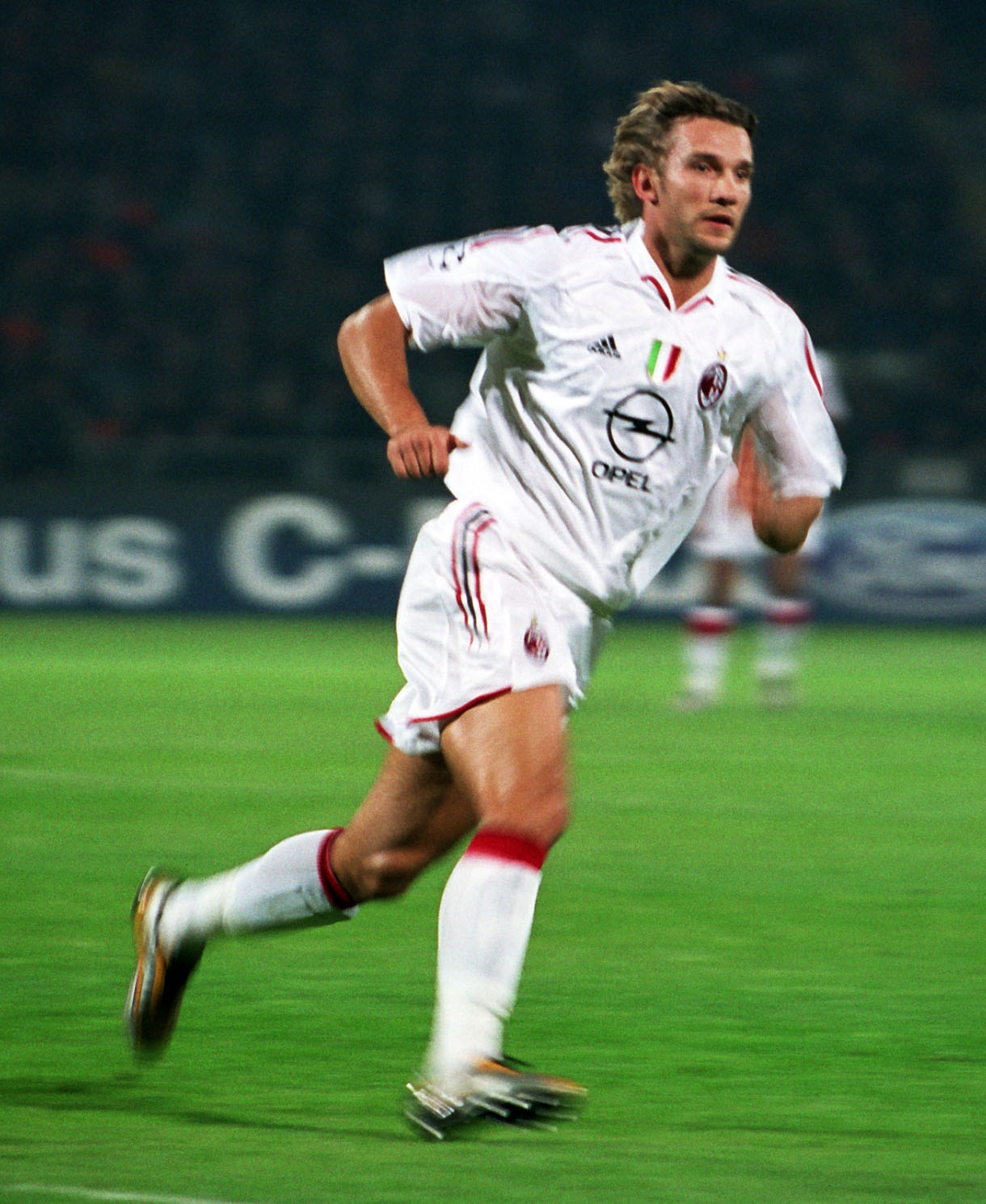
Andriy Shevchenko is Milan's second-highest all-time goalscorer.

List of A.C. Milan players with at least 100 appearances
Player	Nationality	Position	Milan career	Appearances	Goals	Ref.
Alessandro Scarioni	Italy	HB	1909–1915; 1916–1921	118	2	
Cesare Lovati	Italy	HB	1911–1915; 1916–1922	101	6	
Francesco Soldera	Italy	HB	1914–1924	108	9	
Pietro Bronzini	Italy	HB	1919–1926	139	5	
Giuseppe Santagostino	Italy	FW	1921–1932	236	106	
Alfredo De Franceschini	Italy	HB	1922–1929	104	0	
Alessandro Schienoni	Italy	FB	1924–1933	211	0	
Luigi Perversi	Italy	FB	1925–1926; 1927–1940	341	0	
Francesco Pomi	Italy	FB	1926–1933	224	1	
Giuseppe Marchi	Italy	HB	1926–1933	134	2	
Giuseppe Torriani	Italy	FW	1927–1935	206	34	
Dario Compiani	Italy	GK	1927–1935	220	0	
Pietro Arcari	Italy	FW	1930–1936	186	70	
Giuseppe Bonizzoni	Italy	FB	1931–1940	266	2	
Giovanni Moretti	Italy	FW	1931–1939	223	68	
Antonio Bortoletti	Italy	HB	1933–1940	225	1	
Carlo Rigotti	Italy	HB	1933–1937	124	0	
Mario Zorzan	Italy	GK	1935–1941	176	0	
Aldo Boffi	Italy	FW	1936–1943	187	131	
Giuseppe Antonini	/ Italy	HB	1937–1944; 1945–1949	275	23	
Enrico Boniforti	Italy	FB	1939–1943	109	5	
Gianni Toppan	/ Italy	HB	1940–1948	150	1	
Giovanni Rossetti	/ Italy	GK	1941–1951	146	0	
Andrea Bonomi	/ Italy	HB	1942–1952	233	3	
Omero Tognon	/ Italy	HB	1945–1956	342	2	
Ettore Puricelli	/ Italy	FW	1945–1949	116	57	
Carlo Annovazzi	/ Italy	HB	1945–1953	287	55	
Riccardo Carapellese	Italy	FW	1946–1949	106	52	
Mario Foglia	Italy	FB	1946–1951	127	0	
Renzo Burini	Italy	FW	1948–1953	194	88	
Gunnar Nordahl	Sweden	FW	1949–1956	268	221	
Gunnar Gren	Sweden	HB	1949–1953	137	38	
Nils Liedholm	Sweden	HB	1949–1961	394	89	
Lorenzo Buffon	Italy	GK	1950–1959	300	0	
Arturo Silvestri	Italy	FB	1950–1955	163	7	
Amleto Frignani	Italy	FW	1951–1956	142	29	
Francesco Zagatti	Italy	FB	1952–1962	252	2	
Eros Beraldo	Italy	HB	1952–1959	133	4	
Alfio Fontana	Italy	FB	1953–1955; 1956–1960	170	7	
Mario Bergamaschi	Italy	HB	1953–1958	151	4	
Cesare Maldini	Italy	FB	1954–1966	412	3	
Juan Alberto Schiaffino	Uruguay / Italy	HB	1954–1960	171	60	
Carlo Galli	Italy	FW	1956–1961	128	57	
Giovanni Trapattoni	Italy	MF	1958–1971	351	6	
Mario Trebbi	Italy	FB	1958–1966	167	1	
José Altafini	Brazil / Italy	FW	1958–1965	246	161	
Giorgio Ghezzi	Italy	GK	1959–1965	144	0	
Ambrogio Pelagalli	Italy	HB	1960; 1961–1966	154	1	
Mario David	Italy	FB	1960–1965	140	8	
Gianni Rivera	Italy	MF	1960–1979	658	164	
Giovanni Lodetti	Italy	MF	1962–1970	288	26	
Bruno Mora	Italy	FW	1962–1969	148	33	
Dario Barluzzi	Italy	GK	1962–1967	102	0	
Giuliano Fortunato	Italy	FW	1962–1967	104	22	
Amarildo	Brazil	FW	1963–1967	131	38	
Nello Santin	Italy	DF	1963–1969	104	0	
Karl-Heinz Schnellinger	West Germany	DF	1965–1974	334	3	
Angelo Sormani	Italy	FW	1965–1970	180	65	
Roberto Rosato	Italy	DF	1966–1973	269	8	
Pierino Prati	Italy	FW	1966; 1967–1973	209	102	
Angelo Anquilletti	Italy	DF	1966–1977	418	2	
Fabio Cudicini	Italy	GK	1967–1972	183	0	
Romeo Benetti	Italy	MF	1970–1976	251	49	
Giorgio Biasiolo	Italy	MF	1970–1977	215	17	
Giulio Zignoli	Italy	DF	1970–1974; 1975–1976	110	1	
Alberto Bigon	Italy	MF	1971–1980	329	90	
Giuseppe Sabadini	Italy	DF	1971–1978	244	17	
Aldo Maldera	Italy	DF	1972; 1973–1982	310	39	
Luciano Chiarugi	Italy	FW	1972–1976	155	60	
Maurizio Turone	Italy	DF	1972–1978	191	2	
Walter De Vecchi	Italy	MF	1974; 1978–1981	112	11	
Enrico Albertosi	Italy	GK	1974–1980	233	0	
Aldo Bet	Italy	DF	1974–1981	204	2	
Egidio Calloni	Italy	FW	1974–1978	143	54	
Fulvio Collovati	Italy	DF	1976–1982	198	8	
Giorgio Morini	Italy	U	1976–1980	107	7	
Ruben Buriani	Italy	MF	1977–1982	180	14	
Roberto Antonelli	Italy	FW	1977–1982	143	32	
Franco Baresi	Italy	DF	1978–1997	719	33	
Walter Novellino	Italy	MF	1978–1982	151	14	
Francesco Romano	Italy	MF	1979–1983	108	4	
Sergio Battistini	Italy	MF	1979–1985	201	37	
Ottorino Piotti	Italy	GK	1980–1984	132	0	
Mauro Tassotti	Italy	DF	1980–1997	583	10	
Andrea Icardi	Italy	MF	1981–1986	162	6	
Alberico Evani	Italy	MF	1981–1993	393	19	
Vinicio Verza	Italy	MF	1982–1985	106	17	
Filippo Galli	Italy	DF	1983–1996	325	4	
Agostino Di Bartolomei	Italy	MF	1984–1987	122	14	
Pietro Paolo Virdis	Italy	FW	1984–1989	186	76	
Ray Wilkins	England	MF	1984–1987	105	3	
Paolo Maldini	Italy	DF	1985–2009	902	33	
Alessandro Costacurta	Italy	DF	1986; 1987–2007	663	3	
Roberto Donadoni	Italy	MF	1986–1996; 1997–1999	390	23	
Giovanni Galli	Italy	GK	1986–1990	147	0	
Daniele Massaro	Italy	FW	1986–1988; 1989–1995	306	70	
Carlo Ancelotti	Italy	MF	1987–1992	160	11	
Angelo Colombo	Italy	MF	1987–1990	115	7	
Ruud Gullit	Netherlands	MF	1987–1993; 1994	171	56	
Marco van Basten	Netherlands	FW	1987–1993	201	124	
Frank Rijkaard	Netherlands	MF	1988–1993	201	26	
Demetrio Albertini	Italy	MF	1989–1990; 1991–2002	406	28	
Marco Simone	Italy	FW	1989–1997; 2001–2002	260	75	
Sebastiano Rossi	Italy	GK	1990–2002	330	0	
Stefano Eranio	Italy	MF	1992–1997	140	12	
Dejan Savićević	Yugoslavia	MF	1992–1998	144	34	
Zvonimir Boban	Yugoslavia / Croatia	MF	1992–2001	251	30	
Christian Panucci	Italy	DF	1993–1997	134	12	
Marcel Desailly	France	MF	1993–1998	186	7	
George Weah	Liberia	FW	1995–1999	147	58	
Massimo Ambrosini	Italy	MF	1995–1997; 1998–2013	489	36	
Leonardo	Brazil	FW	1997–2001; 2002–2003	124	30	
Oliver Bierhoff	Germany	FW	1998–2001	119	44	
Thomas Helveg	Denmark	DF	1998–2003	147	2	
Christian Abbiati	Italy	GK	1999–2005; 2008–2016	380	0	
Andriy Shevchenko	Ukraine	FW	1999–2006; 2008–2009	322	175	
Serginho	Brazil	DF	1999–2008	281	24	
Gennaro Gattuso	Italy	MF	1999–2012	468	11	
Dida	Brazil	GK	2000–2001; 2002–2010	302	0	
Kakha Kaladze	/ Georgia	DF	2001–2009	284	13	
Cristian Brocchi	Italy	MF	2001–2005; 2006–2008	161	6	
Filippo Inzaghi	Italy	FW	2001–2012	300	126	
Rui Costa	Portugal	MF	2001–2006	192	11	
Andrea Pirlo	Italy	MF	2001–2011	401	41	
Dario Šimić	Croatia	DF	2002–2008	129	1	
Jon Dahl Tomasson	Denmark	FW	2002–2005	115	36	
Alessandro Nesta	Italy	DF	2002–2012	326	10	
Clarence Seedorf	Netherlands	MF	2002–2012	432	62	
Cafu	Brazil	DF	2003–2008	166	4	
Kaká	Brazil	MF	2003–2009; 2013–2014	307	104	
Ignazio Abate	Italy	DF	2003–2004; 2009–2019	306	3	
Alberto Gilardino	Italy	FW	2005–2008	132	44	
Marek Jankulovski	Czech Republic	DF	2005–2011	158	5	
Daniele Bonera	Italy	DF	2006–2015	201	0	
Alexandre Pato	Brazil	FW	2008–2012	150	63	
Mathieu Flamini	France	MF	2008–2013	122	8	
Gianluca Zambrotta	Italy	DF	2008–2012	107	2	
Luca Antonini	Italy	DF	2008–2013	111	1	
Thiago Silva	Brazil	DF	2009–2012	119	6	
Kevin-Prince Boateng	Ghana	MF	2010–2013; 2016	114	18	
Zlatan Ibrahimović	Sweden	FW	2010–2012; 2020–2023	163	93	
Robinho	Brazil	FW	2010–2014	144	32	
Urby Emanuelson	Netherlands	MF	2011–2013; 2013–2014	106	5	
Philippe Mexès	France	DF	2011–2016	114	7	
Stephan El Shaarawy	Italy	FW	2011–2015	102	27	
Mattia De Sciglio	Italy	DF	2011–2017	133	0	
Riccardo Montolivo	Italy	MF	2012–2019	158	10	
Cristián Zapata	Colombia	DF	2012–2019	148	5	
Andrea Poli	Italy	MF	2013–2017	109	3	
Giacomo Bonaventura	Italy	MF	2014–2020	184	35	
Suso	Spain	FW	2015–2016; 2016–2020	153	24	
Davide Calabria	Italy	DF	2015–2025	272	10	
Alessio Romagnoli	Italy	DF	2015–2022	247	10	
Gianluigi Donnarumma	Italy	GK	2015–2021	251	0	
Franck Kessié	Ivory Coast	MF	2017–2022	223	37	
Hakan Çalhanoğlu	Turkey	FW	2017–2021	172	32	
Matteo Gabbia	Italy	DF	2017–2018; 2019–2023; 2024–	146	6	
Samu Castillejo	Spain	MF	2018–2022	113	10	
Ismaël Bennacer	Algeria	MF	2019–2025	178	8	
Rafael Leão	Portugal	FW	2019–2026	291	80	
Ante Rebić	Croatia	FW	2019–2023	123	29	
Théo Hernandez	France	DF	2019–2025	262	34	
Rade Krunić	Bosnia and Herzegovina	MF	2019–2024	139	3	
Alexis Saelemaekers	Belgium	MF	2020–2023; 2024; 2025–	185	13	
Brahim Díaz	Spain / Morocco	MF	2020–2023	124	18	
Sandro Tonali	Italy	MF	2020–2023	130	7	
Pierre Kalulu	France	DF	2020–2024	112	3	
Simon Kjær	Denmark	DF	2020–2024	122	1	
Fikayo Tomori	England	DF	2021–	219	7	
Olivier Giroud	France	FW	2021–2024	132	49	
Mike Maignan	France	GK	2021–	219	0	
Ruben Loftus-Cheek	England	MF	2023–	109	13	
Christian Pulisic	United States	FW	2023–	146	47	
Tijjani Reijnders	Netherlands	MF	2023–2025	104	19	

== Club captains ==
Since 1899, 45 players have held the position of club captain for Milan. The first club captain was David Allison, who filled the role for the inaugural season. The longest-serving club captain is Franco Baresi, who captained the club from 1982 to 1997. Baresi also has the distinction of having won the most trophies as club captain, with 17; he won five Serie A titles, four Italian Super Cups, three European Cup/Champions League titles, three European Super Cups and two Intercontinental Cups.

List of A.C. Milan club captains
Dates	Player	Nationality	Notes
1899–1900	David Allison	England	First club captain and one of the charter members of the club
1900–1908	Herbert Kilpin	England	Founding father of the club; also served as player-manager from 1899 to 1906
1908–1909	Gerolamo Radice	Italy	First club captain from Italy
1909–1910	Guido Moda	Italy	
1910–1911	Max Tobias	Belgium	
1911–1913	Giuseppe Rizzi	Italy	
1913–1915	Louis Van Hege	Belgium	
1915–1916	Marco Sala	Italy	
1916–1919	Aldo Cevenini	Italy	
1919–1921	Alessandro Scarioni	Italy	
1921–1922	Cesare Lovati	Italy	
1922–1924	Francesco Soldera	Italy	
1924–1926	Pietro Bronzini	Italy	
1926–1927	Gianangelo Barzan	Italy	
1927–1929	Abdon Sgarbi	Italy	
1929–1930	Alessandro Schienoni	Italy	
1930–1933	Mario Magnozzi	Italy	
1933–1934	Carlo Rigotti	Italy	
1934–1936	Giuseppe Bonizzoni	Italy	
1936–1938	Luigi Perversi	Italy	
1938–1939	Giuseppe Bonizzoni (2)	Italy	
1939–1940	Antonio Bortoletti	Italy	
1940–1941	Bruno Arcari	Italy	
1941–1942	Giuseppe Meazza	Italy	
1942–1944	Giuseppe Antonini	Italy	
1944–1945	Paolo Todeschini	Italy	
1945–1948	Giuseppe Antonini (2)	/ Italy	
1948	Ettore Puricelli	Italy	
1948–1952	Andrea Bonomi	Italy	
1952–1953	Carlo Annovazzi	Italy	
1953–1956	Omero Tognon	Italy	
1956–1961	Nils Liedholm	Sweden	
1961	Francesco Zagatti	Italy	
1961–1966	Cesare Maldini	Italy	
1966–1975	Gianni Rivera	Italy	
1975–1976	Romeo Benetti	Italy	
1976–1979	Gianni Rivera (2)	Italy	
1979–1980	Alberto Bigon	Italy	
1980–1981	Aldo Maldera	Italy	
1981–1982	Fulvio Collovati	Italy	
1982–1997	Franco Baresi	Italy	Led the team to more official trophies (17) than any other Milan captain
1997–2009	Paolo Maldini	Italy	
2009–2013	Massimo Ambrosini	Italy	
2013–2017	Riccardo Montolivo	Italy	
2017–2018	Leonardo Bonucci	Italy	
2018–2022	Alessio Romagnoli	Italy	
2022–2025	Davide Calabria	Italy	
2025–	Mike Maignan	France	

== Honours ==
List of players who won at least ten trophies with Milan:

Rank	Player	SA	CI	SCI	UCL	CWC	EL	USC	FCWC IC	Total
1	(Italy) Paolo Maldini	7	1	5	5	-	-	5	3	26
2	(Italy) Alessandro Costacurta	7	1	5	5	-	-	4	2	24
3	(Italy) Franco Baresi	6	-	4	3	-	-	3	2	18
3	(Italy) Roberto Donadoni	6	-	4	3	-	-	3	2	18
4	(Italy) Mauro Tassotti	5	-	4	3	-	-	3	2	17
4	(Italy) Filippo Galli	5	-	4	3	-	-	3	2	17
7	(Netherlands) Marco van Basten	4	-	4	3	-	-	3	2	16
8	(Italy) Demetrio Albertini	5	-	3	3	-	-	2	2	15
9	(Italy) Daniele Massaro	4	-	3	2	-	-	3	2	14
9	(Italy) Marco Simone	4	-	3	2	-	-	3	2	14
11	(Italy) Gianni Rivera	3	4	-	2	2	-	-	1	12
11	(Netherlands) Ruud Gullit	3	-	3	2	-	-	2	2	12
11	(Italy) Sebastiano Rossi	5	-	3	1	-	-	2	1	12
11	(Italy) Massimo Ambrosini	4	1	2	2	-	-	2	2	12
15	(Italy) Alberico Evani	3	-	2	2	-	-	2	2	11
16	(Netherlands) Frank Rijkaard	2	-	2	2	-	-	2	2	10
16	(Italy) Gennaro Gattuso	2	1	2	2	-	-	2	1	10
16	(Italy) Filippo Inzaghi	2	1	2	2	-	-	2	1	10
16	(Netherlands) Clarence Seedorf	2	1	2	2	-	-	2	1	10
16	(Italy) Alessandro Nesta	2	1	2	2	-	-	2	1	10
