= Gianluigi Donnarumma =

Italian footballer (born 1999)

Gianluigi Donnarumma Cavaliere OMRI
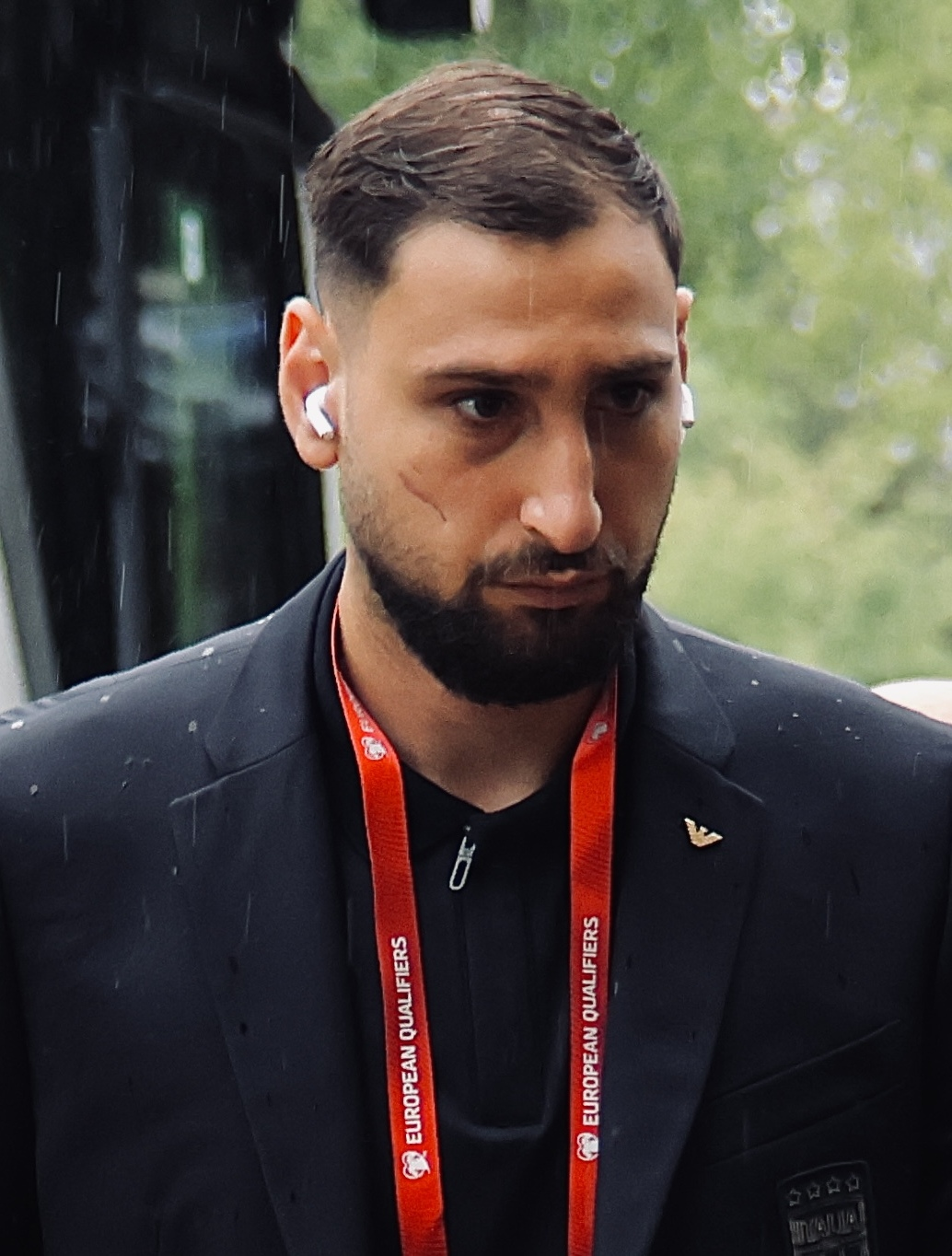
- Donnarumma with Italy in 2025

Personal information
- Full name: Gianluigi Donnarumma
- Date of birth: 25 February 1999 (age 27)
- Place of birth: Castellammare di Stabia, Italy
- Height: 1.96 m (6 ft 5 in)
- Position: Goalkeeper

Team information
- Current team: Manchester City
- Number: 1

Youth career
- 2003–2013: ASD Club Napoli
- 2013–2015: AC Milan

Senior career*
Years	Team	Apps	(Gls)
2015–2021	AC Milan	215	(0)
2021–2025	Paris Saint-Germain	104	(0)
2025–	Manchester City	44	(0)

International career^{‡}
2014	Italy U15	4	(0)
2014	Italy U16	3	(0)
2014–2015	Italy U17	10	(0)
2016–2017	Italy U21	7	(0)
2016–	Italy	89	(0)
Medal record
Men's Football
Representing Italy
UEFA European Championship
Winner	2020 Europe
UEFA Nations League
Third place	2021 Italy
Third place	2023 Netherlands
CONMEBOL–UEFA Cup of Champions
Runner-up	2022 England
- * Club domestic league appearances and goals as of 23:57, 7 November 2026 (UTC) ‡ National team caps and goals as of 15 November 2026

Gianluigi Donnarumma (Italian pronunciation: [dʒanluˈiːdʒi ˌdɔnnaˈrumma]; born 25 February 1999) is an Italian professional footballer, who plays as a goalkeeper for Premier League club Manchester City and captains the Italy national team. He is considered one of the best goalkeepers in the world.

Coming through the team's youth system, Donnarumma began his career with AC Milan in 2015, becoming the second-youngest goalkeeper ever to debut in Serie A, aged 16 years and 242 days; he immediately broke into the starting line-up, earning a reputation as arguably the most promising young goalkeeper in the world at the time. In 2021, Donnarumma helped Milan secure a second-place finish in the 2020–21 Serie A and qualification for the 2021–22 UEFA Champions League after an eight-year absence. After six years with Milan, Donnarumma moved to Ligue 1 side Paris Saint-Germain in June 2021 on a free transfer, where he won the UEFA Champions League as part of a treble in 2025, and won the Yashin Trophy a second time. He was named Best FIFA Men's Goalkeeper for 2025.

Internationally, Donnarumma broke the record as the youngest Italian to ever play for the U21 team, aged 17 years and 28 days in March 2016. Six months later, he made his senior international debut, becoming the youngest goalkeeper ever to appear for Italy, aged 17 years and 189 days. Donnarumma represented Italy at UEFA Euro 2020, helping the team win the tournament and winning the Player of the Tournament award, a first for a goalkeeper. He also represented Italy at UEFA Euro 2024.

== Early life ==
Donnarumma was born in Castellammare di Stabia in the Province of Naples, the son of Alfonso and Marinella. His older brother, Antonio, also came through AC Milan's youth system as a goalkeeper. Since childhood, he has supported Milan, although he grew up idolising Gianluigi Buffon.

== Club career ==
=== AC Milan ===
==== 2003–2015: Youth career ====
Donnarumma grew up in the football academy of ASD Club Napoli in his native Castellammare di Stabia, which he joined in 2003. In 2013, at the age of 14, he was signed for €250,000 (equivalent to €310,000 in 2023) by AC Milan, the team for which his elder brother, Antonio, had already played. Between 2013 and 2015, he was part of the Rossoneri youth academy, where he always played in the age group above him, beginning with the Giovanissimi, then the Allievi, and finally the Primavera. Three days before his 16th birthday, in February 2015, he received his first call-up to the senior team from manager Filippo Inzaghi; though he did not feature in the league match against Cesena, his presence on the substitutes' bench had required a special dispensation due to his age. In March 2015, Donnarumma signed his first professional contract with Milan, effective from 1 July 2015 until 30 June 2018.

==== 2015–16: Immediate breakthrough into starting eleven ====
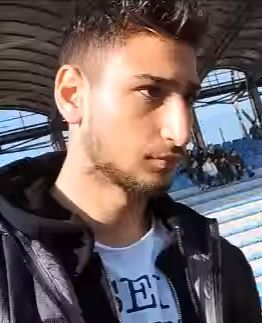
Donnarumma in 2015

At the beginning of the 2015–16 season, Donnarumma was promoted to the senior team by manager Siniša Mihajlović, initially as the third-choice goalkeeper behind Diego López and Christian Abbiati. During Milan's pre-season tour of China, he made his debut in an International Champions Cup match against Real Madrid on 30 July. Replacing López in the 72nd minute, he kept a clean sheet for the remainder of the match, but was one of two Milan players to miss his penalty shoot-out attempt in an eventual 10–9 loss. His subsequent starting appearance against Sassuolo in the final of the TIM Trophy saw him save two penalties in the shootout to secure Milan's victory.

Donnarumma made his competitive debut in Serie A on 25 October 2015 against Sassuolo at the San Siro stadium; chosen to start ahead of López, he helped the team achieve a 2–1 victory after three matches without a win. At the age of 16 years and 242 days, he was the third-youngest goalkeeper to start a match in the history of Italian football; 13 days older than Giuseppe Sacchi, who coincidentally made his Serie A debut with Milan on the very same date, 73 years earlier; and two months older than Gianluca Pacchiarotti, who made his Serie A debut with Pescara in 1980. López subsequently hailed him as "the future of Milan and of Italian football". Donnarumma kept his first clean sheet three days later in a 1–0 win against Chievo. After three successive victories featuring Donnarumma in the starting line-up, Milan avoided a defeat against Atalanta as a result of an impressive display from their goalkeeper; "Donnarumma worked miracles", commented the Gazzetta dello Sport. His performances that year earned him a place among the top 25 of Don Balón's ranking of the world's best footballers under age 21.

By the start of 2016, Donnarumma had firmly supplanted López as the first-choice goalkeeper for Milan, who subsequently offered him a revised, three-year contract. His first appearance in the Derby della Madonnina, Milan's crosstown rivalry with Internazionale, came on 31 January 2016; the clash ended in a 3–0 victory after he stopped Éder from scoring. In March, he was briefly hospitalised after suffering a head injury in an on-pitch collision with Chievo's Fabrizio Cacciatore. Donnarumma featured ahead of Abbiati in Milan's 1–0 defeat to Juventus in the Coppa Italia Final, as the club failed to qualify for European competition at the end of the season.

==== 2016–2021: Established first-choice goalkeeper ====
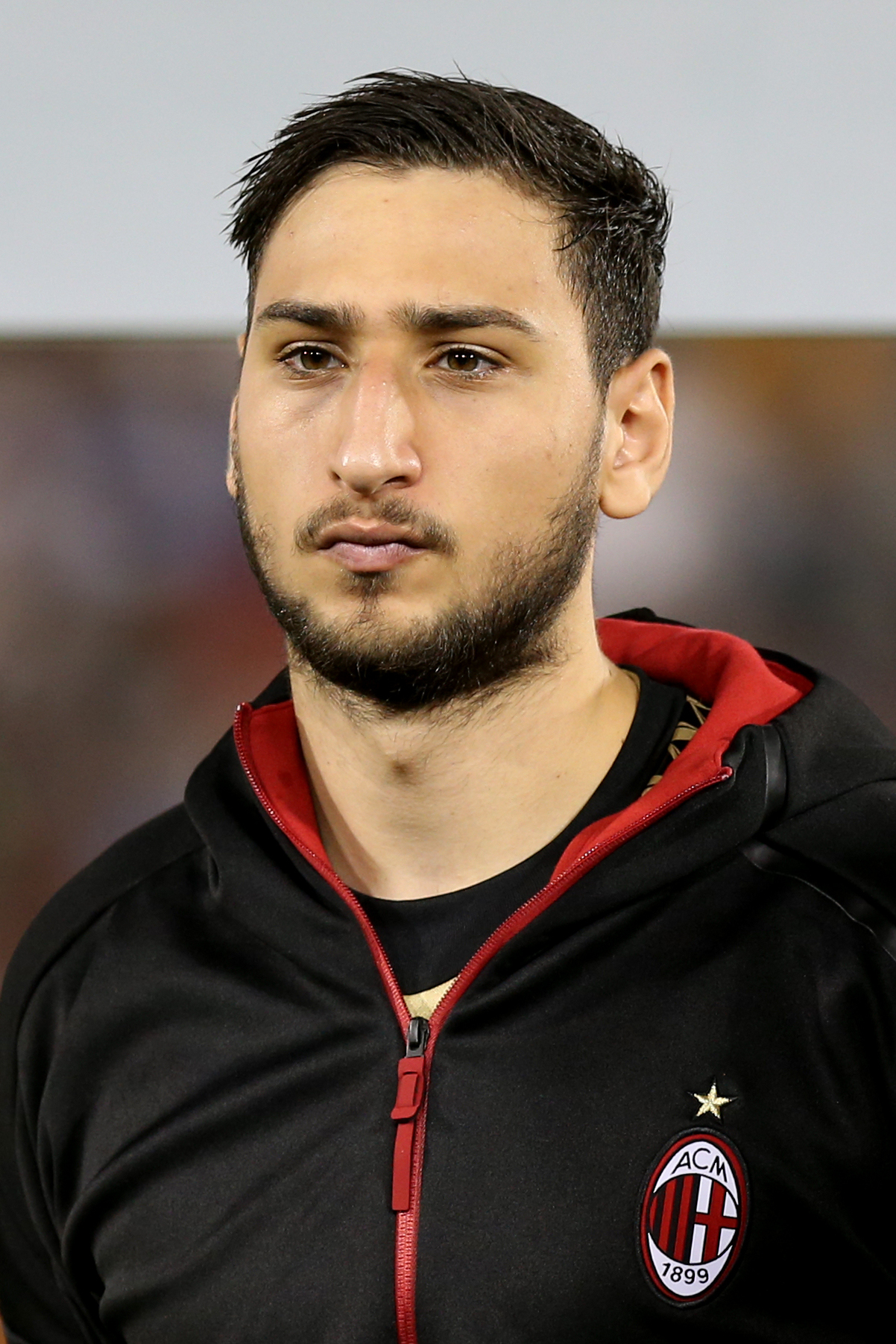
Donnarumma lining up for AC Milan in 2016

In the club's opening league match of the 2016–17 season against Torino, on 21 August 2016, Donnarumma saved the first penalty of his professional career; he stopped Andrea Belotti's shot in injury time, which enabled Milan to seal a 3–2 victory at home. He kept his first clean sheet of the season in the 1–0 victory against Sampdoria on 16 September. On 23 December, Donnarumma helped lead Milan to victory in the Supercoppa Italiana, saving Paulo Dybala's penalty in a 4–3 shoot-out win following a 1–1 draw after extra time. On 15 June 2017, it was initially announced that Donnarumma would not be renewing his contract with Milan, however on 11 July, after much speculation, he renewed with Milan until 2021. Under the terms of a new contract, negotiated by agent Mino Raiola on behalf of the player, Donnarumma's annual salary rose to €6 million; the deal also included a verbal agreement to sign his older brother, Antonio, as a backup goalkeeper with an annual salary of €1 million.

Donnarumma played his first European game in a 1–0 win against Universitatea Craiova in the first leg of Milan's Europa League third-round qualification match on 27 July 2017, in which he managed to keep a clean sheet. He also kept another clean sheet in the second leg the following week, as Milan beat their opponent 2–0. He kept his third consecutive clean sheet in the competition in Milan's 6–0 win against Shkëndija in the first leg of the play-off round. He kept another clean sheet in his first match in new Serie A season against Crotone. On 30 December, Donnarumma played his 100th game for Milan in a 1–1 draw against Fiorentina; becoming the youngest player to make 100 appearances with Milan's jersey. On 28 February 2018, following a 0–0 aggregate draw after extra-time, Donnarumma saved two penalties in a 5–4 shoot-out victory over Lazio in the second leg of the Coppa Italia semi-finals in Rome, which allowed Milan to advance to the final of the competition. On 15 April, Donnarumma became the youngest player to reach 100 appearances in Serie A, aged 19 years and 49 days, after a 0–0 home draw against Napoli. On 9 May, Donnarumma started in Milan's 4–0 defeat to Juventus in the Coppa Italia final, who won their fourth consecutive title.

Following the arrival of Pepe Reina during the 2018–19 season, manager Gennaro Gattuso announced that the two goalkeepers would share the role of starting goalkeeper across the club's competitions, with Donnarumma starting in Serie A, while Reina started in the Europa League. On 3 February 2019, Donnarumma was named man-of-the-match in Milan's 1–1 away draw with Roma in the 21st Round of the 2018–19 Serie A season, making five important saves. On 10 February, he made his 150th Milan appearance in a 3–0 home win over Cagliari in Serie A; as a result he became Milan's tenth-most capped keeper of all time, behind Christian Abbiati (380), Sebastiano Rossi (330), Dida (302), Lorenzo Buffon (300), Enrico Albertosi (233), Dario Compiani (221), Fabio Cudicini (183), Giovanni Rossetti (180), and Mario Zorzan (176).

During the 2019–20 season, Donnarumma maintained his place in the starting line-up. On 21 July 2020, he played his 200th game for the club in a 2–1 away win over Sassuolo in Serie A, during which he wore the captain's armband for the first time in his career, after Alessio Romagnoli was subbed off due to injury. Following his performances throughout the season, in March 2021, he was named the 2020 Serie A Goalkeeper of the Year by AIC and named to the Serie A Team of the Year at the Gran Galà del Calcio, the first time in his career that he had received this honour.

In the 2020–21 season, Donnarumma continued to be a starting goalkeeper (with Ciprian Tătărușanu as a primary back-up) and the team's occasional captain, in particular during the latter part of season. He appeared in all but one game in Serie A and 11 times in the Europa League as Milan finished second and reached the round of 16, respectively. Prior to and during the season, the club's management made numerous attempts to extend Donnarumma's expiring contract yet failed to meet the player's wage demands of €1 million per month as well as €20 million in agent commission for Mino Raiola and pulled out of the negotiation in late May 2021.

On 26 May 2021, Milan director of football Paolo Maldini confirmed that Donnarumma would leave Milan when his contract expired on 30 June. During his time with Milan, Donnarumma made 251 appearances for the club in all competitions, keeping 88 clean sheets, and played a key role in helping the club finish second in Serie A (and qualify for the Champions League for the first time since 2014) in his final season. For his performances, Donnarumma was named Lega Serie A Best Goalkeeper.

=== Paris Saint-Germain ===
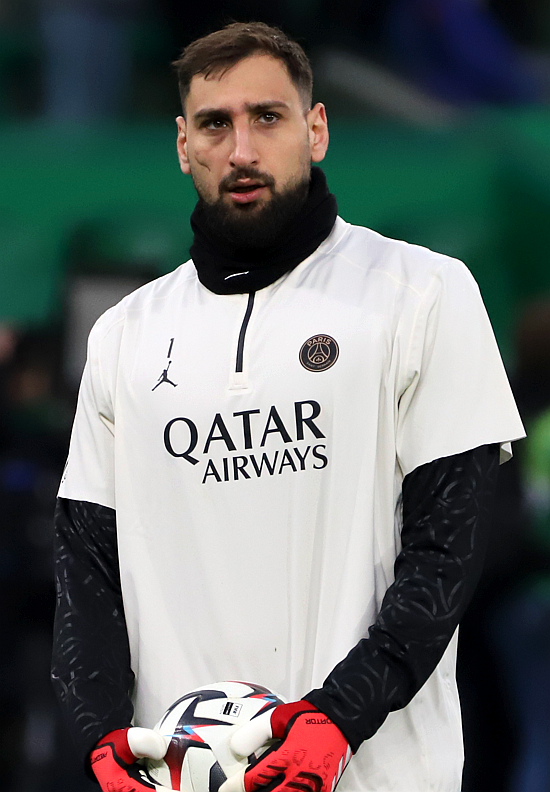
Donnarumma with Paris Saint-Germain in 2025

On 16 June 2021, Donnarumma agreed to a five-year contract with Ligue 1 club Paris Saint-Germain (PSG), as reported by Fabrizio Romano and The Guardian. According to reports, PSG offered him a salary of €12 million after tax per season. He passed his medical in Florence on 21 June. On 15 July, Donnarumma officially joined PSG and signed a five-year contract until 30 June 2026. Donnarumma made his debut for PSG in a 4–0 league win over Clermont on 11 September. He made his UEFA Champions League debut in a 2–0 win over Manchester City on 28 September. On 3 November, Donnarumma saved his first PSG and Champions League penalty in a 2–2 draw against RB Leipzig. On 29 November, Donnarumma won the Yashin Trophy, awarded to the best performing goalkeeper of the year.

On 25 October 2023, exactly eight years after making his senior debut for Milan, Donnarumma faced his former club for the first time as an opponent in a UEFA Champions League group stage match at the Parc des Princes, where PSG claimed a 3–0 victory. On 7 November, in the return leg which Milan won 2–1, thousands of Milan supporters threw custom banknotes bearing the name "Dollarumma" onto the pitch, mocking him for leaving the club to join PSG on a free transfer.

On 18 December 2024, during a 2024–25 Ligue 1 match between Monaco and PSG, Donnarumma sustained a serious facial injury when a kick from Wilfried Singo struck him in the face, leaving a deep cut. The incident went unpunished by the referee. The injury left Donnarumma with a permanent facial scar, and Singo later issued a public apology. On 11 March 2025, in a 2024–25 UEFA Champions League match against Liverpool, Donnarumma saved two penalty kicks from Darwin Núñez and Curtis Jones, allowing Désiré Doué to win the penalty shootout and eliminating Liverpool from the competition. His notable performances in the Champions League knockout phase against Liverpool, Aston Villa, and Arsenal led to him being cited as a key player in PSG's run to the 2025 Champions League final. In the final against Inter Milan, Donnarumma kept a clean sheet as PSG won 5–0 to win their first Champions League, also completing their first continental treble. The following month, he took part in the 2025 FIFA Club World Cup with PSG, helping his team reach the final, where they were defeated 3–0 by Chelsea.

On 11 August 2025, Donnarumma was left out of the PSG squad for the 2025 UEFA Super Cup after the arrival of new goalkeeper Lucas Chevalier. The following day, Donnarumma announced that he would be departing from the French club as a result of being left out.

=== Manchester City ===
On 2 September 2025, Premier League club Manchester City announced the signing of Donnarumma on a five-year deal, with an option for a further year, for a reported transfer fee of £26 million. On 14 September, he made his debut for the club in the Manchester derby, keeping a clean sheet in a 3–0 home victory over Manchester United. On 22 September, Donnarumma won the Yashin Trophy. He achieved a domestic double in his debut season under Pep Guardiola, winning the EFL Cup and FA Cup, although he did not feature in either competition.

== International career ==
=== 2014–2017: Youth career ===
Donnarumma was the starting goalkeeper for Italy's under-17 team at the 2015 UEFA European Under-17 Championship. The following year on 24 March, he made his debut for the under-21 side in a 4–1 win over the Republic of Ireland, becoming the youngest player ever to play for the team, aged 17 years and 28 days, breaking the record previously held by Federico Bonazzoli.

In June 2017, he was included in the Italy under-21 squad for the 2017 UEFA European Under-21 Championship by manager Luigi Di Biagio. Italy were eliminated in the semi-finals following a 3–1 defeat to Spain on 27 June.

=== 2016–2019: Senior debut ===
Though predicted to attend the 2016 UEFA European Championship, Donnarumma did not make Antonio Conte's final squad for the tournament. On 27 August, he was called up to the senior squad by Gian Piero Ventura for a friendly against France on 1 September and a 2018 World Cup qualification match on 5 September against Israel, making him the youngest player, aged 17 years and six months, to be called up to the senior squad since 1911. On 1 September, in the match against France, Donnarumma made his senior debut, subbing out Gianluigi Buffon at the half-time mark of a 3–1 home loss; the youngest goalkeeper to ever play for Italy aged 17 years and 189 days. On 28 March 2017, he made his first starting appearance in a 2–1 away win over the Netherlands; the youngest goalkeeper for Italy to do so aged 18 years and 31 days.

Widely regarded as the heir of Buffon, following the international retirement of the latter in 2018, Donnarumma was chosen as the first-choice goalkeeper by the new head coach Roberto Mancini and played as a starter in all the matches of the 2018–19 UEFA Nations League disputed by the Azzurri.

=== 2021–present: Euro 2020 triumph and Euro 2024 ===
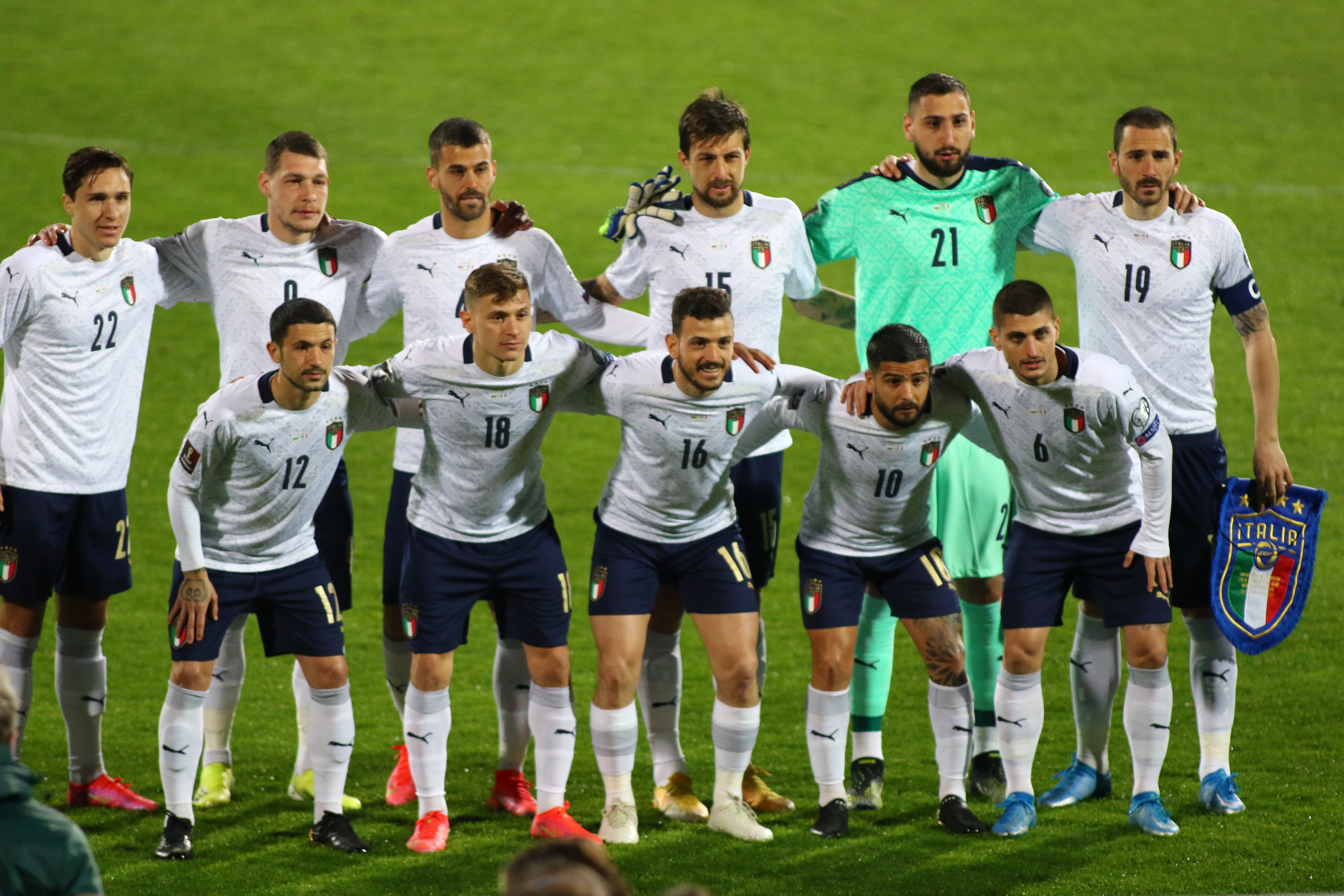
Donnarumma (top, second from right) lining up for Italy in 2021

In June 2021, Donnarumma was included in Italy's squad for UEFA Euro 2020. In his first game at the competition, on 11 June against Turkey, he kept a clean sheet in a 3–0 win for Italy. He kept clean sheets in Italy's next two group wins against Switzerland and Wales, coming off for Salvatore Sirigu late on in the final group match. During the round of 16 match against Austria, he helped Italy's defence break Dino Zoff's record for the longest unbeaten streak in international matches, which he had set between 1972 and 1974; the unbeaten streak finally came to an end during the same match, after 1,168 minutes, following Saša Kalajdžić's goal in the 114th minute, as Italy won the match 2–1 in extra-time. Donnarumma played for 987 minutes of the current record, sharing it with Salvatore Sirigu, Alessio Cragno, and Alex Meret, who each played for 91, 63, and 27 minutes respectively. In the semi-final against Spain on 6 July, following a 1–1 draw after extra-time, he saved Álvaro Morata's spot-kick to help Italy to a 4–2 penalty shoot-out victory, which allowed Italy to advance to the final of the tournament. On 11 July, in the final against England at Wembley Stadium, following a 1–1 draw after extra-time, Donnarumma saved two spot kicks during the penalty shootout, including the decisive final kick, to win the tournament for Italy for the first time since 1968. For his performances throughout the competition, including keeping three clean sheets, making nine saves, and conceding only four goals in seven appearances, he was named Player of the Tournament by UEFA, the first time a goalkeeper had won the award.

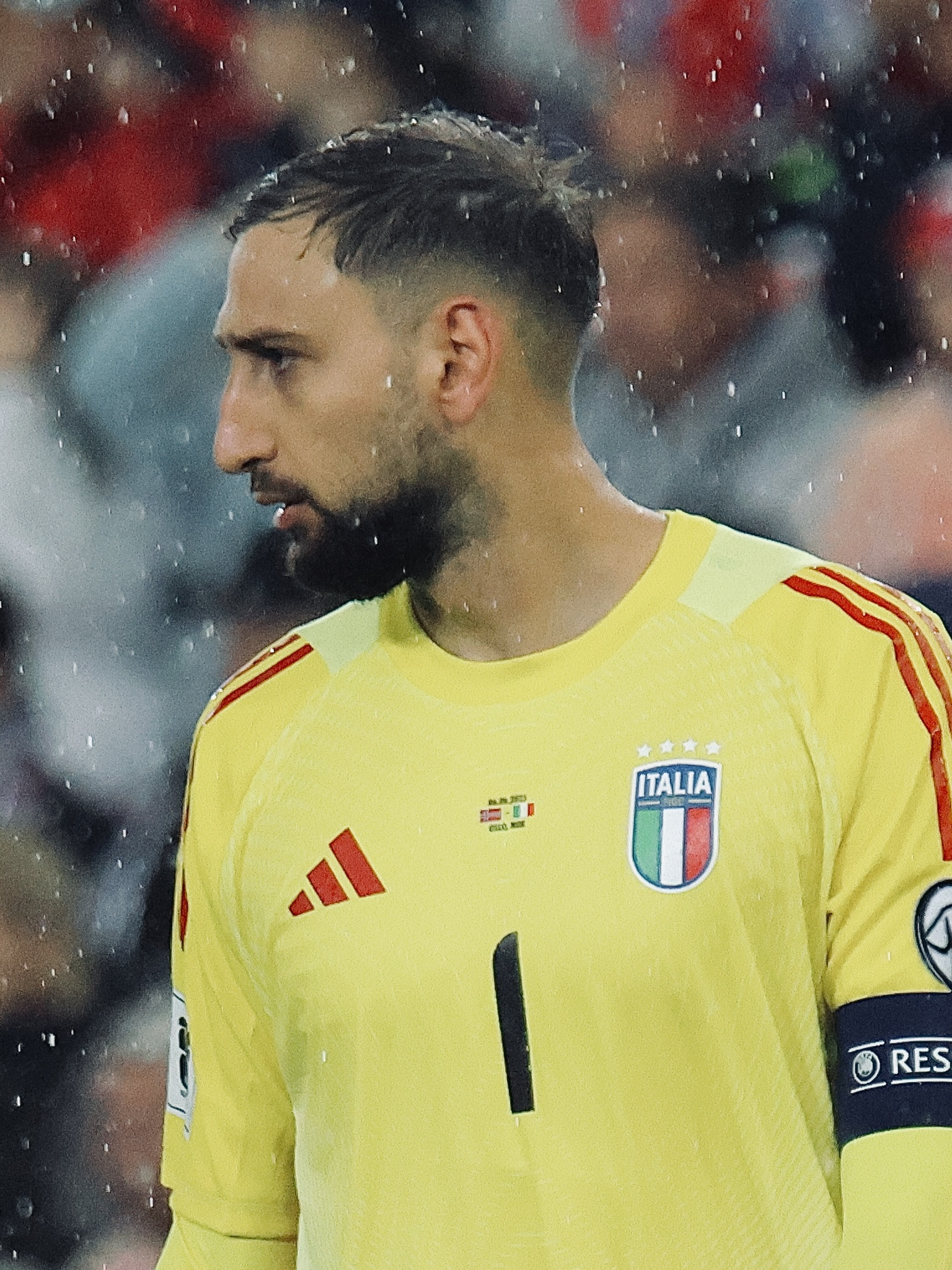
Donnarumma captaining Italy in 2025

On 10 October 2021, he captained his national team for the first time in a 2–1 win against Belgium during the Nations League Finals third place play-off, which made him the youngest Azzurri captain since Gianni Rivera in 1965.

Donnarumma was named captain of the Italy squad for UEFA Euro 2024 in May 2024. In Italy's final group match on 24 June, a 1–1 draw against Croatia, he saved a penalty from goalscorer Luka Modrić; the result saw Italy advance to the knock-out stages in second place in their group, behind Spain. Italy were eliminated from the tournament in the round of 16 following a 2–0 loss to Switzerland. In the 2026 FIFA World Cup qualification, Italy lost 4–1 on penalties to Bosnia and Herzegovina after a 1–1 draw in the play-off final, failing to reach the World Cup for the third consecutive time.

== Style of play ==
Long considered one of Italy's most exciting prospects, and one of the most promising young footballers of his generation, Donnarumma is widely regarded as the successor to Gianluigi Buffon. Buffon himself has in turn praised his physical strength and technical abilities, mental composure and decision making. Predicting an "extraordinary career" in his future, he commended Donnarumma's maturity and ability to cope with the pressures of being a goalkeeper at such a young age. Another of Italy's World Cup-winning goalkeepers, Dino Zoff, similarly said Donnarumma seems "predestined to become a great goalkeeper," adding that "it all depends completely on him." Former Milan and Italy goalkeeper Giovanni Galli also described Donnarumma as a potentially world-class goalkeeper, applauding him for his discipline, intelligence, concentration, and professionalism, despite his young age.

"He has great talent and I think he can do more than I did with Milan's colours, because he is very young ... Gigio has already demonstrated his value, and I think he's going to develop even more."

— Former Milan keeper Dida on Donnarumma

A 2015 ESPN profile praised Donnarumma's fundamental goalkeeping skills, identifying his large slender frame and reach, agility, and composed nature as his biggest strengths; writer Nick Dorrington additionally described the teenager as "a natural leader [with] the necessary confidence to organise a defence featuring players twice his age." Despite his tall and imposing stature, Donnarumma possesses good reactions, and is highly effective at stopping penalties. Matt Jones has also praised Donnarumma for his shot-stopping ability, and speed when rushing off his line to face opponents in one on one situations. Former Milan goalkeeper Christian Abbiati touted Donnarumma as a potential future captain for Milan in 2016, noting that Donnarumma's temperament, introverted character, and ability to withstand pressure were all the necessary qualities needed for him to succeed in this role. Although Donnarumma is regarded as being competent with the ball at his feet, pundits such as Mina Rzouki, Paolo Menicucci, and Sam Lopresti, as well as former goalkeeper Fernando Orsi, have cited his ball control and distribution, as well as his overall consistency, positioning, handling, punching technique, and his ability to defend crosses and command his box as areas in which he needs to improve as he gains more experience.

Although Donnarumma's ability to live up to his potential was initially brought into question following his move to Paris Saint–Germain, in part due to his inconsistency and several errors he made as a result of his perceived weaknesses when playing with his feet, he later established himself as one of the best goalkeepers in the world at the club, in particular under the guidance of manager Luis Enrique, who initially dropped him for reserve keeper Matvey Safonov, who was better suited to the manager's playing style, which involved building plays from the back under pressure. However, Donnarumma worked to improve his composure, ability with his feet, and his command of his area, and won back Enrique's faith in him, as well as his place in the starting line-up. During the club's 2024–25 treble-winning season, he stood out for his all-round goalkeeping abilities, being praised in particular in the media for his positioning, shot-stopping, athleticism, reflexes, ability to stop penalties, and cover the goal with his frame, as well as his improved ability to come off his line and claim crosses.

== Personal life ==
Since 2017, Donnarumma has been in a relationship with Alessia Elefante. In July 2023, Donnarumma and Elefante were attacked at his home in Paris during a robbery. In September 2024, the couple welcomed their first child, Leo. Donnarumma and Elefante married on 24 July 2026.

== Career statistics ==
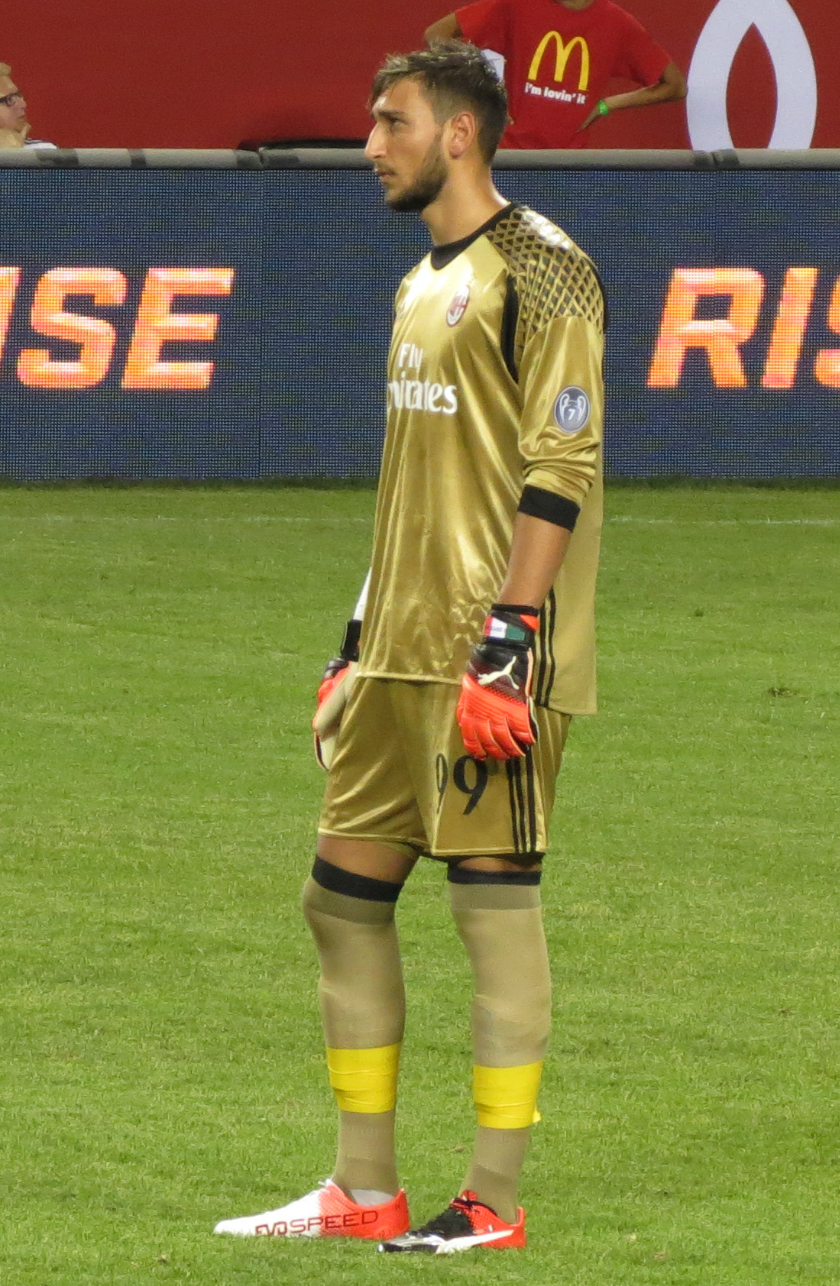
Donnarumma playing for AC Milan in 2016

=== Club ===
As of match played 7 November 2026

Appearances and goals by club, season and competition
Club	Season	League			National cup (Note: Includes Coppa Italia, Coupe de France, FA Cup)		League cup (Note: Includes EFL Cup)		Europe		Other		Total	
Club	Season	Division	Apps	Goals	Apps	Goals	Apps	Goals	Apps	Goals	Apps	Goals	Apps	Goals
AC Milan	2015–16	Serie A	30	0	1	0	—		—		—		31	0
AC Milan	2016–17	Serie A	38	0	2	0	—		—		1 (Note: Appearance in Supercoppa Italiana)	0	41	0
AC Milan	2017–18	Serie A	38	0	4	0	—		11 (Note: Appearances in UEFA Europa League)	0	—		53	0
AC Milan	2018–19	Serie A	36	0	2	0	—		0	0	1	0	39	0
AC Milan	2019–20	Serie A	36	0	3	0	—		—		—		39	0
AC Milan	2020–21	Serie A	37	0	0	0	—		11	0	—		48	0
AC Milan	Total		215	0	12	0	—		22	0	2	0	251	0
Paris Saint-Germain	2021–22	Ligue 1	17	0	2	0	—		5 (Note: Appearances in UEFA Champions League)	0	0	0	24	0
Paris Saint-Germain	2022–23	Ligue 1	38	0	1	0	—		8	0	1 (Note: Appearance in Trophée des Champions)	0	48	0
Paris Saint-Germain	2023–24	Ligue 1	25	0	4	0	—		12	0	1	0	42	0
Paris Saint-Germain	2024–25	Ligue 1	24	0	0	0	—		15	0	8 (Note: One appearance in Trophée des Champions, seven appearances in FIFA Club World Cup)	0	47	0
Paris Saint-Germain	Total		104	0	7	0	—		40	0	10	0	161	0
Manchester City	2025–26	Premier League	34	0	0	0	0	0	9	0	—		43	0
Manchester City	2026–27	Premier League	10	0	0	0	0	0	4	0	1 (Note: Appearance in FA Community Shield)	0	15	0
Manchester City	Total		44	0	0	0	0	0	13	0	1	0	58	0
Career total			363	0	19	0	0	0	75	0	13	0	470	0

=== International ===
As of match played 15 November 2026

Appearances and goals by national team and year
National team	Year	Apps	Goals
Italy	2016	2	0
Italy	2017	2	0
Italy	2018	7	0
Italy	2019	5	0
Italy	2020	6	0
Italy	2021	18	0
Italy	2022	10	0
Italy	2023	10	0
Italy	2024	10	0
Italy	2025	9	0
Italy	2026	10	0
Total		89	0

== Honours ==
AC Milan

- Supercoppa Italiana: 2016

Paris Saint-Germain

- Ligue 1: 2021–22, 2022–23, 2023–24, 2024–25
- Coupe de France: 2023–24, 2024–25
- Trophée des Champions: 2022, 2023, 2024
- UEFA Champions League: 2024–25

Manchester City

- FA Cup: 2025–26
- EFL Cup: 2025–26

Italy

- UEFA European Championship: 2020
- UEFA Nations League third place: 2020–21, 2022–23

Individual

- UEFA European Championship Player of the Tournament: 2020
- UEFA European Championship Team of the Tournament: 2020
- Yashin Trophy: 2021, 2025
- The Best FIFA Goalkeeper: 2025
- FIFA Men's World 11: 2025
- IFFHS World's Best Goalkeeper: 2021, 2025
- Globe Soccer Awards Best Goalkeeper of the Year: 2021
- FIFPRO World 11: 2021, 2025
- IFFHS Men's World Team: 2021, 2025
- Gazzetta Sports Awards Revelation of the Year: 2016
- Goal.com NxGn: 2017
- Italian Golden Boy Award: 2019
- Serie A Best Goalkeeper: 2020–21
- Serie A Goalkeeper of the Year: 2020, 2021
- Serie A Team of the Year: 2019–20, 2020–21
- UNFP Ligue 1 Goalkeeper of the Year: 2021–22, 2023–24
- UNFP Ligue 1 Team of the Year: 2021–22, 2023–24
- The Athletic Ligue 1 Team of the Season: 2023–24
- UEFA Champions League Team of the Season: 2024–25
- ESM Team of the Year: 2024–25
- Premier League Save of the Month: September 2025

Orders

- Knight of the Order of Merit of the Italian Republic: 2021
