= Bertoletti =

Bertoletti is a surname. Notable people with the surname include:

- Antoine Marc Augustin Bertoletti (1775–1846), Italian army officer
- Maria Bertoletti Toldini (1656–1716), Italian farmeress
- Patrick Bertoletti (born 1985), American competitive eater
- Paulo Bertoletti, Brazilian professional footballer
- Simone Bertoletti (born 1974), former Italian cyclist

== See also ==
- Bartoletti
- Bortoletti
