= Mario Zorzan =

Italian footballer

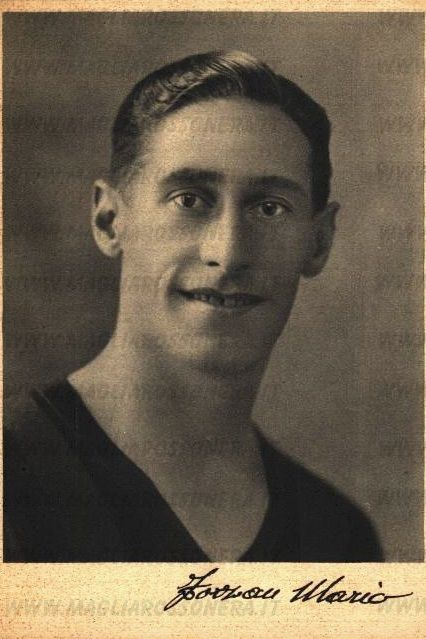
- Zorzan in 1936

Personal information
- Full name: Mario Zorzan
- Date of birth: 15 February 1912
- Place of birth: Vicenza, Italy
- Date of death: 28 January 1973 (aged 60)
- Place of death: Milan, Italy
- Height: 1.78 m (5 ft 10 in)
- Position: Goalkeeper

Youth career
- Vicenza

Senior career*
Years	Team	Apps	(Gls)
1929–1935	Vicenza	108	(0)
1935–1942	Milan	147	(0)
1942–1943	Abbiategrasso		
- * Club domestic league appearances and goals

Mario Zorzan (15 February 1912 – 28 January 1973) was an Italian professional footballer, who played as a goalkeeper.

== Club career ==
Throughout his club career, Zorzan played for Italian sides Vicenza, Milan, and Abbiategrasso. With 176 appearances for Milan, he is the club's ninth-most capped keeper of all time, behind only Christian Abbiati (380), Sebastiano Rossi (330), Dida (302), Lorenzo Buffon (300), Enrico Albertosi (233), Dario Compiani (221), Fabio Cudicini (183), and Giovanni Rossetti (180).
