= Perversi =

Perversi is an Italian surname originally from Lombardy region. Notable people with the surname include:

- Angel Perversi (born 1944), Businessman.
- Luigi Perversi (1906–1991), Italian footballer
- Luigina Perversi (1914–1983), Italian gymnast
