= Cudicini =

Cudicini is an Italian surname. Notable people with the surname include:

- Carlo Cudicini (born 1973), Italian footballer, son of Fabio
- Fabio Cudicini (1935–2025), Italian footballer
