= Pacchiarotti =

Pacchiarotti (pronounced [pakkjaˈrɔtti]) is a surname from Central Italy. Notable people with the name include:

- Gaspare Pacchiarotti (1740–1821), Italian mezzo-soprano castrato
- Giacomo Pacchiarotti (1474–1539/1540), Italian painter
- Gianluca Pacchiarotti (born 1963), Italian football manager and former player

== See also ==
- Pacchierotti
- Pacchiarotto, and How He Worked in Distemper
