= Bartoletti =

Bartoletti is an Italian surname. Notable people with the surname include:

- Bruno Bartoletti (1926–2013), Italian operatic conductor
- Enrico Bartoletti (1916–1976), Italian archbishop
- Gabriele Bartoletti (born 1984), Italian footballer
- Susan Campbell Bartoletti (born 1958), American writer

== See also ==
- Bertoletti
