= Giovanni Rossetti =

Italian footballer

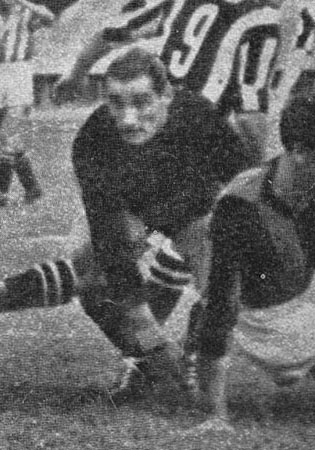
- Rossetti in action with A.C. Milan in 1942

Personal information
- Full name: Giovanni Rossetti
- Date of birth: 29 May 1919
- Place of birth: Milan, Italy
- Date of death: 16 September 1987 (aged 68)
- Place of death: Milan, Italy
- Height: 1.75 m (5 ft 9 in)
- Position: Goalkeeper

Youth career
- Dopolavoro Radaelli
- Milan

Senior career*
Years	Team	Apps	(Gls)
1940–1949	Milan	138	(0)
1950–1951	Milan	1	(0)
1951–1955	Arsenaltaranto		
- * Club domestic league appearances and goals

Giovanni Rossetti (29 May 1919 – 16 September 1987) was an Italian professional footballer, who played as a goalkeeper.

== Club career ==
Throughout his club career, Rossetti played for Italian sides Milan and Arsenaltaranto. With 180 appearances for Milan, he is the club's eighth-most capped keeper of all time, behind only Christian Abbiati (380), Sebastiano Rossi (330), Dida (302), Lorenzo Buffon (300), Enrico Albertosi (233), Dario Compiani (221), and Fabio Cudicini (183).
