= Paolo Todeschini =

Italian footballer (1920–1993)

Personal information
- Date of birth: 22 September 1920
- Place of birth: Milan, Italy
- Date of death: 30 March 1993 (aged 72)
- Place of death: Milan, Italy
- Height: 1.83 m (6 ft 0 in)
- Position: Midfielder

Youth career
- Scarioni
- Milan

Senior career*
Years	Team	Apps	(Gls)
1939–1945	Milan	79	(4)
1945–1946	Bologna	23	(2)
1946–1948	Atalanta	56	(0)
1948–1949	Lazio	15	(0)
1949–1952	Napoli	94	(14)
1952–1953	Palermo	23	(0)
1953–1954	Monza	11	(1)
1954–1955	Mantova	24	(7)
Total		325	(28)

Managerial career
- 1954–1955: Mantova
- 1955–1956: Modena
- 1956–1957: Salernitana
- 1960–1961: Milan
- 1961–1962: Lazio
- 1962–1964: Cosenza
- 1964–1966: Pro Patria
- 1968–1969: Messina
- 1969–1970: Sorrento
- 1971–1972: Entella
- 1972–1973: Sorrento
- 1981–1983: Italy Women
- * Club domestic league appearances and goals

Paolo Todeschini (22 September 1920 – 30 March 1993) was an Italian professional footballer, who played as a midfielder, and football manager.

== Honours ==
Napoli

- Serie B: 1949–50

Sporting positions
Preceded by Giuseppe Antonini	Milan captain 1944-1945	Succeeded by Giuseppe Antonini
