= Pacchierotti =

Pacchierotti (pronounced [pakkjeˈrɔtti]) is a surname from Central Italy. Notable people with the name include:

- Gaspare Pacchierotti (1740–1821), Italian mezzo-soprano castrato
- Ubaldo Pacchierotti (1875/1876–1916), Italian composer

== See also ==
- Pacchiarotti
