= Gabriele Bartoletti =

Italian footballer

Personal information
- Full name: Gabriele Bartoletti
- Date of birth: 19 April 1984 (age 42)
- Place of birth: Rome, Italy
- Height: 1.88 m (6 ft 2 in)
- Position: Goalkeeper

Senior career*
Years	Team	Apps	(Gls)
2003–2005	Pescara	3	(0)
2006–2007	Celano	33	(0)
2007–2008	Sambenedettese	1	(0)
2007–2011	Pescara	6	(0)
2011–2012	Real Scerne	?	(?)
- * Club domestic league appearances and goals as of 3 July 2011

Gabriele Bartoletti (born 19 April 1984 in Rome) is an Italian footballer who plays as a goalkeeper. He appeared in Serie B for Pescara.
