= ASD Elpidiense Cascinare =

Italian football club

Elpidiense Cascinare
- Full name: Associazione Sportiva Dilettantistica Elpidiense Cascinare
- Founded: ?
- Ground: Stadio Montevidoni, Sant'Elpidio a Mare, Italy
- Capacity: 1,000
- League: Eccellenza
- 2009–10: Serie D/F, 17th (relegated)
Home colours	Away colours

Associazione Sportiva Dilettantistica Elpidiense Cascinare is an Italian association football club located in Sant'Elpidio a Mare, Marche. It currently plays in Eccellenza.
