= Paulo Bertoletti =

Brazilian footballer (1914–?)

Paulo
Personal information
- Full name: Paulo Bertoletti
- Date of birth: 27 July 1914
- Place of birth: São Paulo, Brazil
- Position: Forward

Senior career*
Years	Team	Apps	(Gls)
1935	São Paulo		
1936–1937	Estudantes		
1937–1938	Estudante Paulista		
1938–1942	São Paulo	99	(39)
1940	→ Corinthians (loan)	12	(7)
- * Club domestic league appearances and goals

Paulo Bertoletti, mostly known as Paulo, was a Brazilian professional footballer who played as a forward.

== Career ==
Paulo began his career with São Paulo FC's aspirants in 1935. In 1936, he transferred to Estudante,s where he remained until 1937. In 1938, he returned to São Paulo FC, when Estudantes was incorporated. In 1940, he was loaned to Corinthians in the 1940 Torneio Rio-São Paulo.
