= Giuseppe Bonizzoni =

Italian footballer

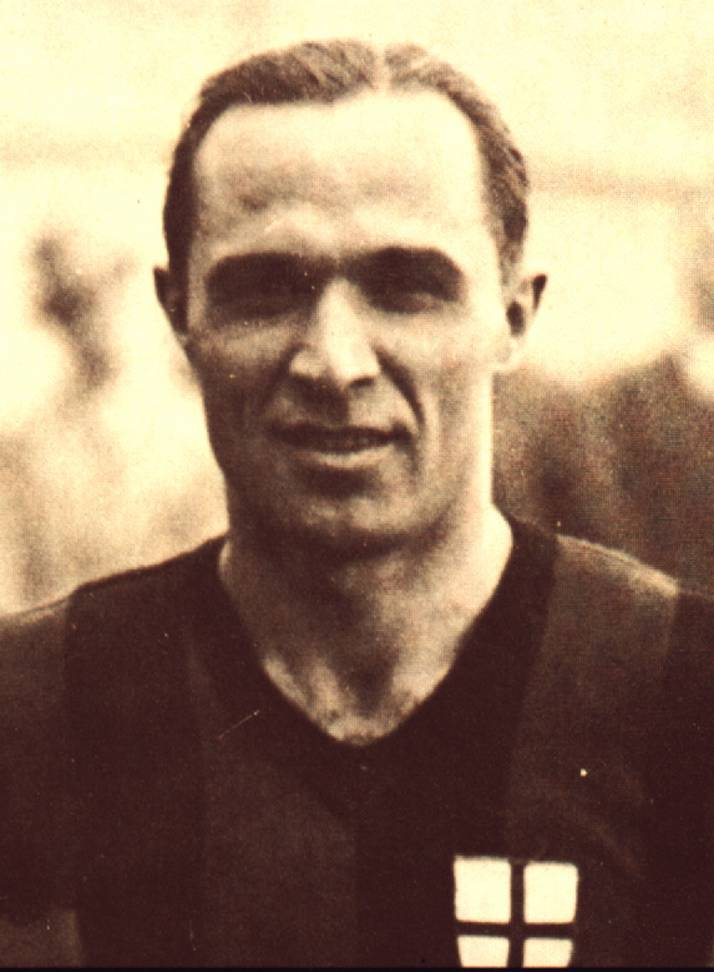

Personal information
- Full name: Giuseppe Bonizzoni
- Date of birth: 22 April 1908
- Place of birth: Genivolta, Italy
- Date of death: 21 July 1976 (aged 68)
- Height: 1.61 m (5 ft 3 in)
- Position: Right back

Youth career
- Cremonese

Senior career*
| Years | Team | Apps | (Gls) |
| 1925–1931 | Cremonese | 42 | (2) |
| 1931–1940 | Milan | 248 | (2) |
| 1940–1941 | Padova | 29 | (3) |

International career
| 1932 | Italy B | 7 | (1) |
- * Club domestic league appearances and goals

Giuseppe Bonizzoni (22 April 1908 – 21 July 1976) was an Italian professional footballer who played as a defender.

He was the uncle of former footballer and manager Luigi Bonizzoni.
