= Francesco Pomi =

Italian footballer

Personal information
- Full name: Francesco Pomi
- Date of birth: 5 January 1905
- Place of birth: Milan, Italy
- Date of death: 22 May 1984 (aged 79)
- Position: Defender

Youth career
- Milan

Senior career*
Years	Team	Apps	(Gls)
1925–1933	Milan	221	(1)
Total		221	(1)
- * Club domestic league appearances and goals

Francesco Pomi (5 January 1905 – 22 May 1984) was an Italian professional footballer, who played as a defender.
