= Gianangelo Barzan =

Italian footballer (1901–1983)

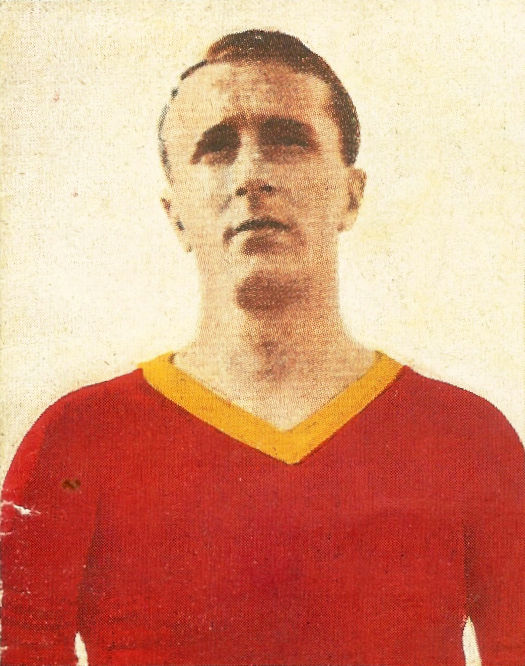
- Barzan with Roma

Personal information
- Date of birth: 24 November 1901
- Place of birth: Adria, Italy
- Date of death: 2 December 1983 (aged 82)
- Place of death: Adria, Italy
- Position: Midfielder

Senior career*
Years	Team	Apps	(Gls)
1919–1921	Petrarca Padova		
1921–1926	Padova	109	(19)
1926–1928	Milan	29	(6)
1928–1931	Roma	45	(3)
1931–1932	Bari	5	(1)
- * Club domestic league appearances and goals

Gianangelo Barzan (24 November 1901 – 2 December 1983) was an Italian footballer who played as a midfielder.

== Career ==
Born in Adria, Barzan began his career with Petrarca Padova, and later played for Padova and Milan, where he served as his team's captain between 1926 and 1927. He later also played for two seasons (27 games, 20 goals) in the Italian Serie A for A.S. Roma and A.S. Bari.
