= Giuseppe Marchi (footballer) =

Italian footballer

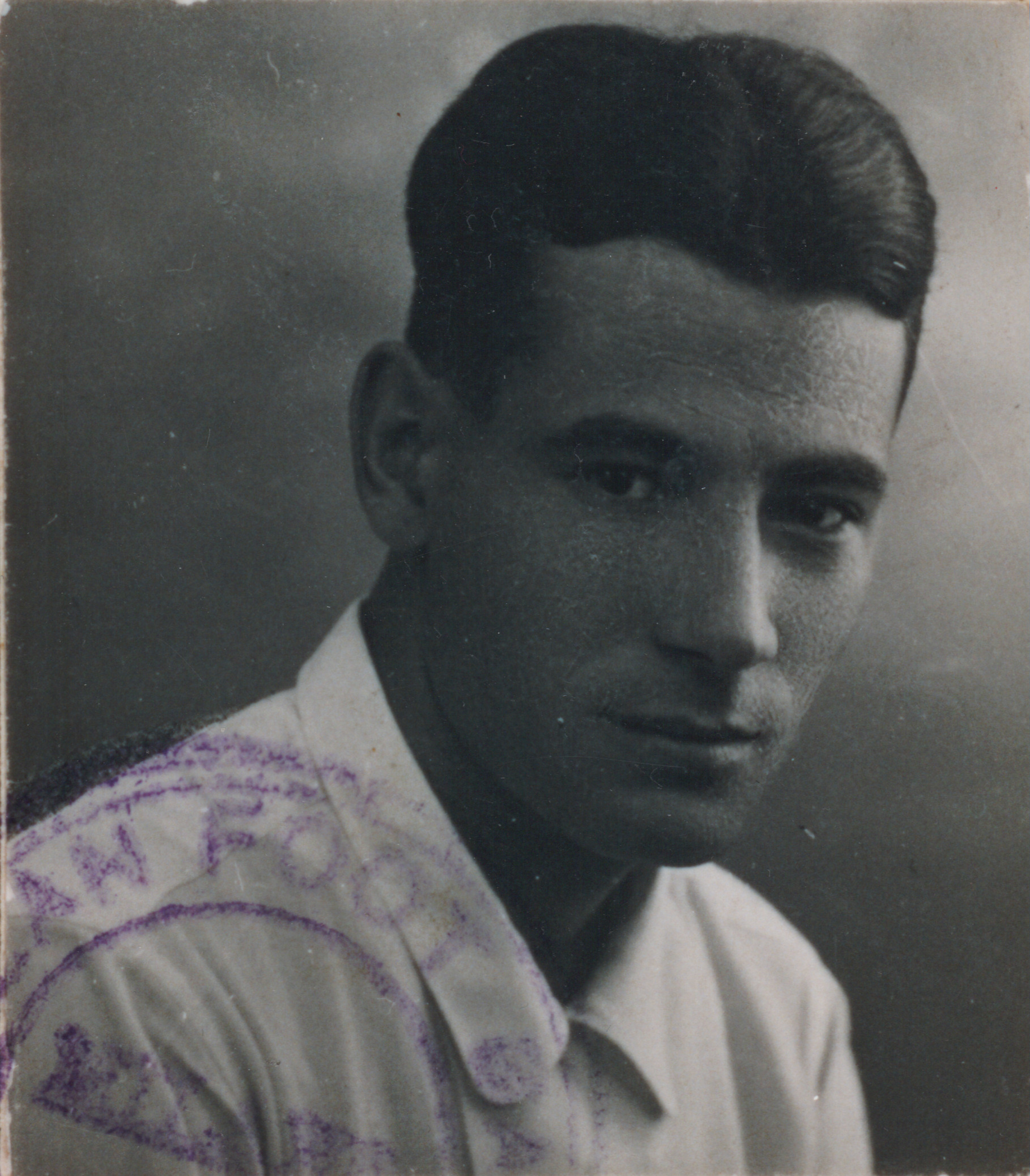

Personal information
- Full name: Giuseppe Marchi
- Date of birth: 2 February 1904
- Place of birth: Reggio Emilia, Italy
- Date of death: 17 July 1967 (aged 63)
- Place of death: Fiorenzuola d'Arda, Italy
- Position: Midfielder

Youth career
- Reggiana

Senior career*
| Years | Team | Apps | (Gls) |
| 1920–1926 | Reggiana | 69 | (2) |
| 1926–1933 | Milan | 131 | (2) |
| 1933–1934 | GC Vigevanesi | 7 | (0) |
| 1934–1935 | Catania | 10 | (1) |
| 1935–1937 | Reggiana | 40 | (2) |

Managerial career
- 1937–1941: Fanfulla
- 1941–1942: Pavese Luigi Belli
- 1942–1944: Internazionale (youth)
- 1945–1946: Pescara
- 1946–1947: Piacenza
- 1947–1948: SPAL
- 1948–1949: Piacenza
- 1950: Luino
- 1952–1954: Fiorenzuola
- 1961–1962: Fiorenzuola
- * Club domestic league appearances and goals

Giuseppe Marchi (2 February 1904 – 17 July 1967) was an Italian professional footballer, who played as a midfielder.
