= Alessandro Schienoni =

Italian footballer (1902-1969)

Personal information
- Full name: Alessandro Schienoni
- Date of birth: 26 November 1902
- Place of birth: Milan, Italy
- Date of death: 11 February 1969 (aged 66)
- Place of death: Milan, Italy
- Position: Defender

Youth career
- Minerva
- Milan

Senior career*
Years	Team	Apps	(Gls)
1924–1933	Milan	208	(0)
1933–1935	Vigevanesi		

Managerial career
- 1938–1968: Dopolavoro Pirelli
- * Club domestic league appearances and goals

Alessandro Schienoni (26 November 1902 – 11 February 1969) was an Italian professional footballer who played as a defender.
