= Maria Bertoletti Toldini =

- Born: 1656; Trentino
- Died: 14 March 1716 (aged 59–60); Brentonico
- Cause of death: Execution
- Known for: Being one of the final victims of the witch trials in Northern Italy
- Criminal penalty: Sentenced to death
- Criminal status: Rehabilitated by modern review

Maria Bertoletti Toldini (c. 1656 – 14 March 1716) was an Italian farmer who was executed in Brentonico for witchcraft.

== Biography ==
=== Before the trial ===
Toldini was known by the nickname 'Toldina.'

By the time of her arrest in August 1715, she was married to her second husband. She had no children with either; her first husband had died. Widowed women were often disadvantaged socially and vulnerable to accusations of witchcraft.

=== Accusations ===
The identity of who first accused Toldini of witchcraft is lost from the historical record, though she was tried not long after three children had gone missing from Brentonico.

According to surviving trial documents, Toldini was accused of having practised witchcraft since the age of 13. She was charged with murdering the missing local children, aged two, three, and five. Locals were particularly outraged by the authorities' claim that she had killed the eldest of the three by throwing them into a pot of boiling cheese.

Other accusations included heresy, adultery, blasphemy, sodomy, and killing the crops of local farms and vineyards through supernatural means. She allegedly derived her powers from a demon associate that accompanied her to witches' Sabbaths. Unusually for the time, Toldini did not attempt to deflect blame by accusing any other women of being witches or accomplices.

=== Trial ===
Toldini maintained her innocence and was represented at trial by lawyer Giovanni Battista del Pozzo, who argued that the court had shown no evidence of her guilt. In a defence that was ultimately unsuccessful, he contended that natural causes were to blame for some of the events ascribed to his client's supposed sorcery.

Toldini was found guilty on 10 March. She was publicly executed by beheading on 14 March 1716, with her body burnt at the stake. Her death marked one of the final executions for witchcraft conducted in the Trento area, and she was the last Italian woman to be burned at the stake for witchcraft.

== Rehabilitation ==
In October 2015, nearly 300 years after Toldini's execution, Brentonico's city council petitioned the Trento Court of Appeals to revisit her conviction.

The efforts were led by Quinto Canali, regional culture minister, who felt compelled to clear Toldini's name after watching a play based on her life. Canali criticised the comedic production for making light of Toldini's death, which he described as "a murder that was not justified". By advancing Canali's cause, mayor Christian Perenzoni explained that the council hoped to address the "folkloric excess" of Italy's witch trials by restoring Toldini's "ethical, moral, and civic dignity".

Toldini's case was subsequently reviewed in March 2016, which vindicated her and concluded that she had been targeted by the local sacristan's family over an inheritance dispute.
