= Giuseppe Antonini =

Italian footballer and manager

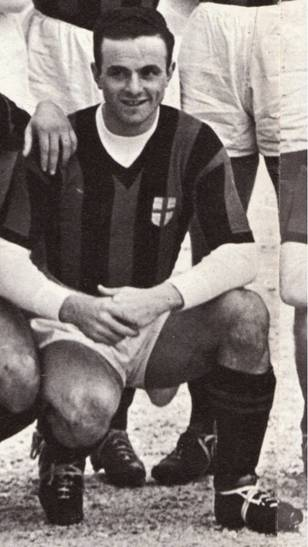

Personal information
- Full name: Giuseppe Antonini
- Date of birth: 2 September 1914
- Place of birth: Verona, Italy
- Date of death: 29 November 1989 (aged 75)
- Place of death: Verona, Italy
- Height: 1.65 m (5 ft 5 in)
- Position: Midfielder

Youth career
- Verona

Senior career*
Years	Team	Apps	(Gls)
1933–1937	Verona	86	(9)
1937–1944	Milan	147	(5)
1945–1949	Milan	107	(17)
1949–1951	Reggiana	22	(2)
Total		362	(33)

Managerial career
- 1955: Piacenza
- * Club domestic league appearances and goals

Giuseppe Antonini (2 September 1914 – 29 November 1989) was an Italian professional footballer, who played as a midfielder, and football manager.

He first debuted with Verona, before signing with AC Milan which he played for for twelve seasons.
