= Antonio Bortoletti =

Italian footballer (1910-1990)

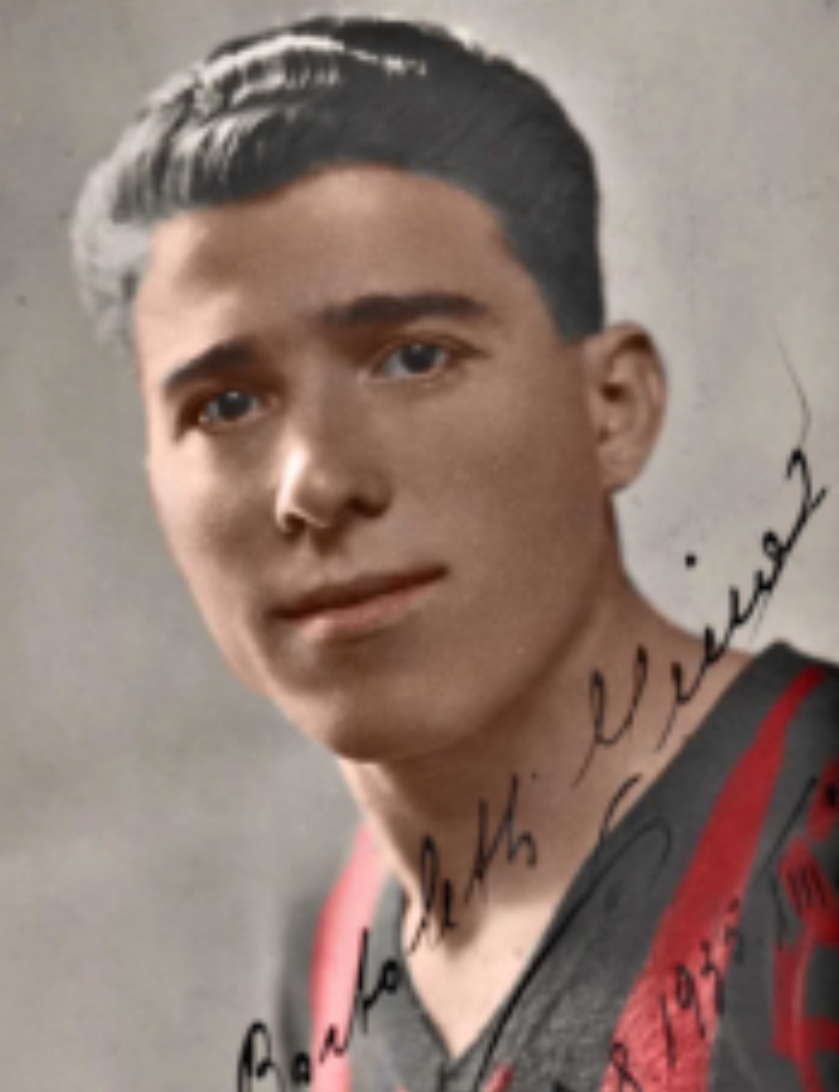

Personal information
- Full name: Antonio Gino Bortoletti
- Date of birth: 23 January 1910
- Place of birth: Mirano, Italy
- Date of death: 20 October 1990 (aged 80)
- Place of death: Mirano, Italy
- Position: Midfielder

Youth career
- Dolo

Senior career*
Years	Team	Apps	(Gls)
1930–1932	Dolo		
1932–1933	Triestina	4	(0)
1933–1940	Milan	204	(1)
1940–1943	Padova	96	(2)
- * Club domestic league appearances and goals

Antonio Gino Bortoletti (23 January 1910 – 20 October 1990) was an Italian professional footballer, who played as a midfielder.
