= Fabio Cudicini =

Italian footballer (1935–2025)

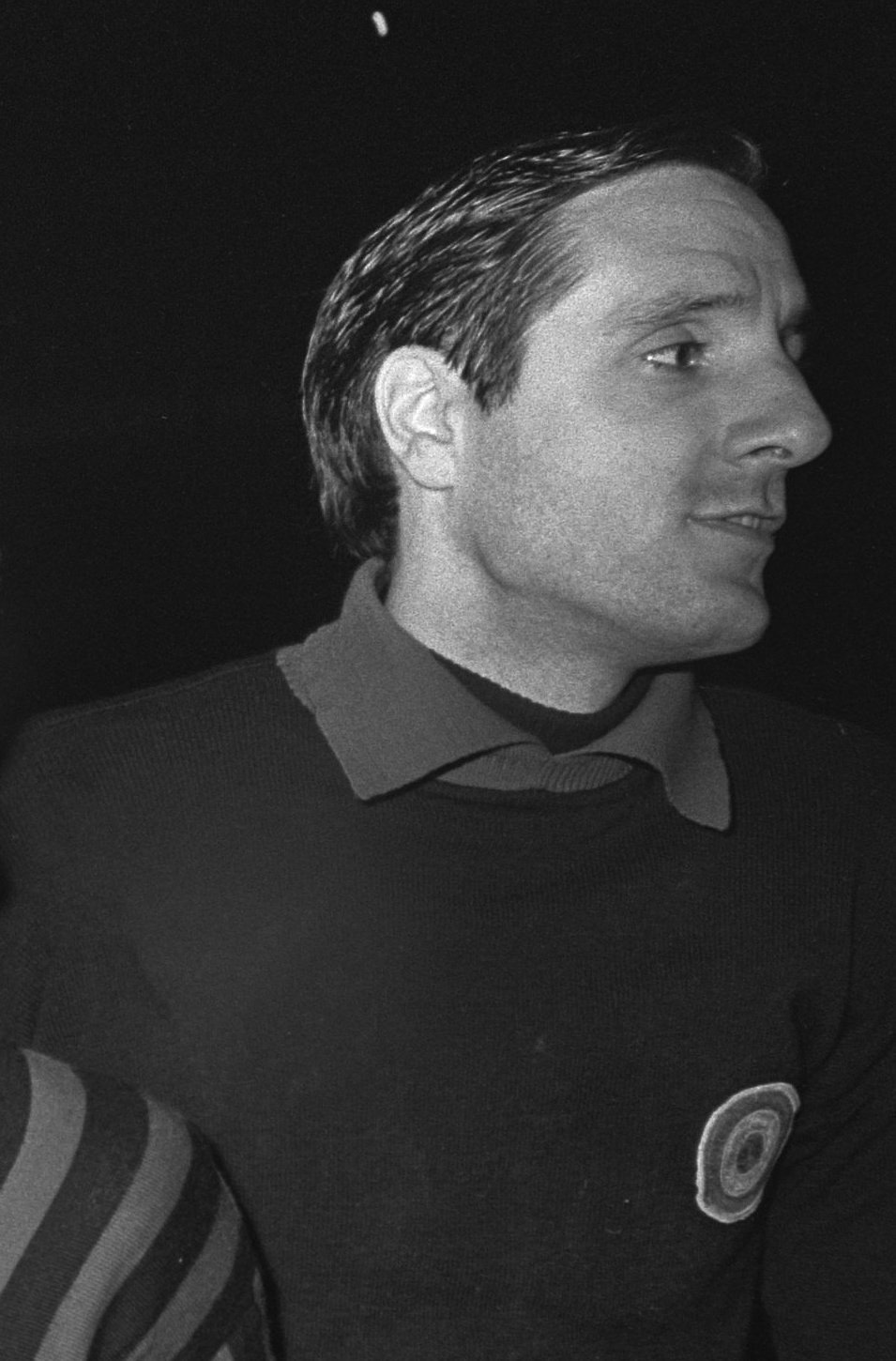
- Cudicini with A.C Milan in 1968

Personal information
- Date of birth: 20 October 1935
- Place of birth: Trieste, Italy
- Date of death: 8 January 2025 (aged 89)
- Place of death: Rome, Italy
- Height: 1.91 m (6 ft 3 in)
- Position: Goalkeeper

Youth career
- 1950–1953: Ponziana

Senior career*
Years	Team	Apps	(Gls)
1953–1955	Ponziana	0	(0)
1955–1958	Udinese	30	(0)
1958–1966	Roma	166	(0)
1966–1967	Brescia	18	(0)
1967–1972	A.C. Milan	127	(0)
Total		341	(0)
- * Club domestic league appearances and goals

Fabio Cudicini (Italian pronunciation: [ˈfaːbjo kudiˈtʃini]; 20 October 1935 – 8 January 2025) was an Italian professional footballer who played as a goalkeeper from 1955 to 1972. Standing at 1.91 m (6 ft 3 in), he was one of the tallest goalkeepers of his time. Despite never playing for the Italy national team, he is regarded as one of the best goalkeepers of his generation, and as one of Italy's best ever goalkeepers. Cudicini is mostly remembered for his highly successful and dominant stint with A.C. Milan, and he is one of the most celebrated goalkeepers in the club's history, helping them win the 1969 European Cup Final in particular, among other domestic, European, and international titles.

== Club career ==
Born in Trieste, Cudicini began his professional career with Udinese in 1955, making his debut during the 1955–56 Serie B season, and obtained promotion to Serie A with the club. In his first season in the Italian top division, he collected 13 appearances throughout the season, and marked his Serie A debut with a clean sheet in a 2–0 home win over Palermo on 2 December 1956. In 1958, he joined Roma. After two seasons as the team's back-up goalkeeper behind Luciano Panetti, he was promoted to the team's starting goalkeeper in 1960, and retained the position for the next six seasons, collecting 166 league appearances, and winning the Inter-Cities Fairs Cup in 1960–61 and a Coppa Italia in 1964. He spent the 1966–67 Serie A season with Brescia, helping the club avoid relegation. In 1967, at the age of 32, he joined Milan, where he remained until his retirement in 1972, making 127 league appearances for the club and 183 appearances in all competitions under manager Nereo Rocco; he achieved notable domestic and international success with the club, winning the Serie A title and the Cup Winners' Cup in his first season, followed by the European Cup and the Intercontinental Cup in 1969, and finally the Coppa Italia in 1972. He is Milan's seventh-most capped keeper of all time, behind only Christian Abbiati (380), Sebastiano Rossi (330), Dida (302), Lorenzo Buffon (300), Enrico Albertosi (233), and Dario Compiani (221).

== International career ==
Despite his reputation and club achievements, Cudicini never played for the Italian senior national team, mainly because of the contemporary presence of several other notable players in his role throughout his career, such as Lorenzo Buffon, Giorgio Ghezzi, Dino Zoff, and Enrico Albertosi. He represented Italy at youth level, however, and during his time with Roma, he was called up to the Italy B team on 8 May 1963; although he never played for the Italy senior team, he was called-up on several occasions, in particular as a back-up to Zoff during Italy's qualifying campaign for the 1970 FIFA World Cup.

== Style of play ==
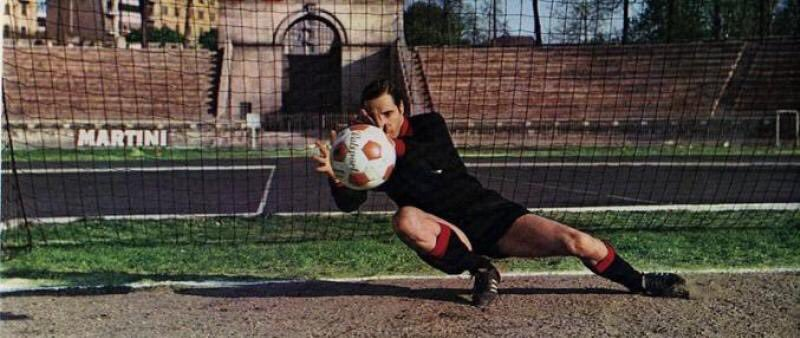
Fabio Cudicini in action for the photographer at the Arena Civica in 1970

Cudicini was known for his agility, reactions, and shot-stopping ability as a goalkeeper, as well as his large reach, and his tall build and long limbs. Cudicini possessed an excellent positional sense. Despite his ability, he often suffered injuries throughout his career. Cudicini wore all-black goalkeeping attire, which earned him the nickname Il Ragno Nero ('The Black Spider'), a nickname which also belonged to Soviet goalkeeper Lev Yashin, who was also known for wearing all-black goalkeeping attire. Before becoming a goalkeeper, Cudicini initially played as a right winger in his youth.

== Personal life and death ==
Cudicini was the father of former Chelsea, Tottenham, and Los Angeles Galaxy goalkeeper Carlo Cudicini. He was also the son of former Ponziana Trieste defender Guglielmo Cudicini (1903–2007).

Cudicini died in Rome on 8 January 2025, at the age of 89.

== Honours ==
Roma

- Coppa Italia: 1963–64
- Inter-Cities Fairs Cup: 1960–61

AC Milan

- Serie A: 1967–68
- Coppa Italia: 1971–72
- European Cup: 1968–69
- European Cup Winners' Cup: 1967–68
- Intercontinental Cup: 1969

Individual

- A.C. Milan Hall of Fame
