= Gianluca Pacchiarotti =

Italian footballer (born 1963)

Gianluca Pacchiarotti (born 30 August 1963) is an Italian football manager and former player who played as a goalkeeper.

== Career ==
Pacchiarotti holds the record for the youngest goalkeeper to debut in Serie A. He took to the field wearing the Pescara shirt on 9 March 1980, at the age of 16 years and 192 days in the Perugia-Pescara match.

In September 1984, during the Pescara-Napoli match of the Coppa Italia, he conceded a goal from Diego Maradona, the first from open play scored by the Argentine champion in Italy.

He played for the white and blue Abruzzese team until 1985 (one appearance in Serie A, nine in Serie B and two in Serie C1), to continue his career in Casertana (C1) until 30 June 1986, with the exception of one season in the Bundesliga with Schalke 04. From February 1988, he continued his career in the lower leagues, playing until the age of 40.

He was a youth international several times in the Italian Under-16, Juniors, Under-21 Serie B and military national team (1985–86 season).

After retiring from competitive football, he began working as a goalkeeping coach for lower-league teams in Abruzzo. He earned his federal third-tier coaching license (later UEFA B) in 1994. In 2010, he earned his FIGC professional goalkeeping coaching license.
