= Luigi Perversi =

Italian footballer

Personal information
- Full name: Luigi Perversi
- Date of birth: 22 May 1906
- Place of birth: Santa Cristina e Bissone, Italy
- Date of death: 27 February 1991 (aged 84)
- Place of death: Garbagnate, Italy
- Height: 1.72 m (5 ft 8 in)
- Position: Full-back

Youth career
- Striver
- Milan

Senior career*
| Years | Team | Apps | (Gls) |
| 1925–1940 | Milan | 318 | (0) |
| 1926–1927 | → Modena (loan) | | |
- * Club domestic league appearances and goals

Luigi Perversi (22 May 1906 – 27 February 1991) was an Italian professional footballer who played as a full-back. He made 341 appearances for A.C. Milan, during the late 1920s and 1930s.
