= Dario Compiani =

Italian footballer and manager (1903-1962)

Personal information
- Full name: Luigi Antonio Compiani
- Date of birth: 1 September 1903
- Place of birth: Spinadesco, Italy
- Date of death: 4 April 1962 (aged 58)
- Place of death: Cremona, Italy
- Height: 1.72 m (5 ft 8 in)
- Position: Goalkeeper

Senior career*
Years	Team	Apps	(Gls)
1921–1927	Cremonese	101	(0)
1927–1936	Milan	221	(0)
1936–1937	Sampierdarenese	0	(0)
1937–1938	Cremonese	5	(0)
Total		327	(0)

Managerial career
- 1938–1940: Castrum Giulianova
- 1940–1941: Teramo
- 1942–1943: Battipagliese
- 1945–1947: Torrese
- 1949–1950: Castrum Giulianova
- * Club domestic league appearances and goals

Luigi Antonio "Dario" Compiani (1 September 1903 – 4 April 1962) was an Italian professional footballer and football manager, who played as a goalkeeper.

== Club career ==
Throughout his club career, Compiani played for Italian sides Cremonese, Milan, and Sampierdarenese. With 221 appearances for Milan, he is the club's sixth-most capped goalkeeper of all time, behind only Christian Abbiati (380), Sebastiano Rossi (330), Dida (302), Lorenzo Buffon (300), and Enrico Albertosi (233).
