= Enrico Albertosi =

Italian footballer (born 1939)

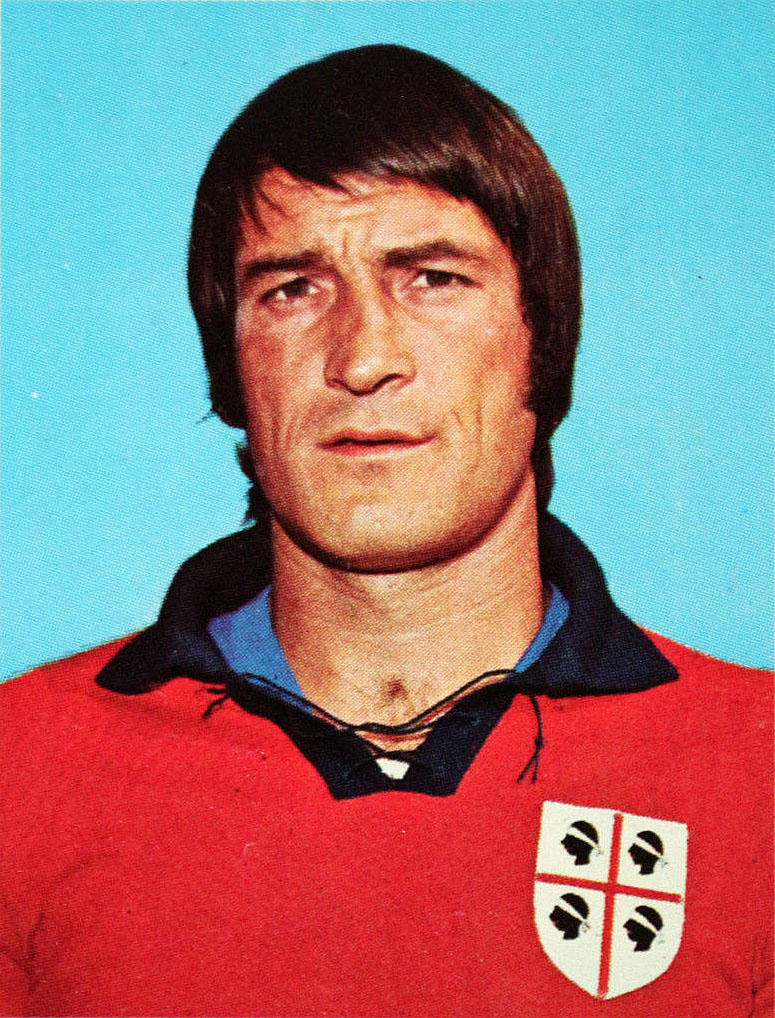
- Albertosi with Cagliari in 1973

Personal information
- Date of birth: 2 November 1939 (age 86)
- Place of birth: Pontremoli, Italy
- Height: 1.82 m (5 ft 11 1/2 in)
- Position: Goalkeeper

Youth career
- 1957–1958: Spezia

Senior career*
Years	Team	Apps	(Gls)
1958–1968	Fiorentina	185	(0)
1968–1974	Cagliari	177	(0)
1974–1980	Milan	170	(0)
1982–1984	Elpidiense	44	(0)
Total		576	(0)

International career
1961–1974	Italy	34	(0)
Medal record
Men's football
Representing Italy (as player)
UEFA European Championship
Winner	1968 Italy
FIFA World Cup
Runner-up	1970 Mexico
- * Club domestic league appearances and goals

Enrico "Ricky" Albertosi (Italian pronunciation: [enˈriːko ˈriːki alberˈtoːzi, -oːsi]; born 2 November 1939) is an Italian former footballer who played as a goalkeeper. Regarded as one of Italy's greatest ever goalkeepers, he had a successful club career, winning titles with Fiorentina, Cagliari, and Milan, before retiring with Elpidiense. He also played for the Italy national team in the 1966 World Cup and the 1970 World Cup, in which Italy reached the final, as well as being a member of the Italy teams that took part in the 1962 and 1974 World Cups. Albertosi was also included in the Italy squad that won the 1968 European Championship.

== Club career ==
Born in Pontremoli, at club youth level, Albertosi represented the Spezia youth academy for a season, before making his debut in Serie A at the age of 18 for Fiorentina on 18 January 1959, playing in a goalless draw with Roma. Despite heavy competition from Giuliano Sarti during his first five seasons at the Tuscan club, where he initially mainly served as a back-up, Albertosi represented Fiorentina until 1968, winning a Mitropa Cup in 1966, a European Cup Winners' Cup in 1961 (the first ever edition of the competition), and 2 Coppa Italia trophies in 1961 and 1966. He later transferred to Luigi Riva's side, Cagliari, where he helped to win Cagliari's legendary first and only Scudetto during the 1969–70 season, his second season with the Sardinian club, recording what was at the time the lowest number of goals conceded in a 16-team Serie A campaign. He later transferred to Milan in 1974, where he remained for six years, and he won yet another Serie A championship medal with the club during the 1978–79 season, along with another Coppa Italia during the 1976–77 season. With 233 appearances for the club, he is Milan's fifth-most capped keeper of all time, behind only Christian Abbiati (380), Sebastiano Rossi (330), Dida (302) and Lorenzo Buffon (300).

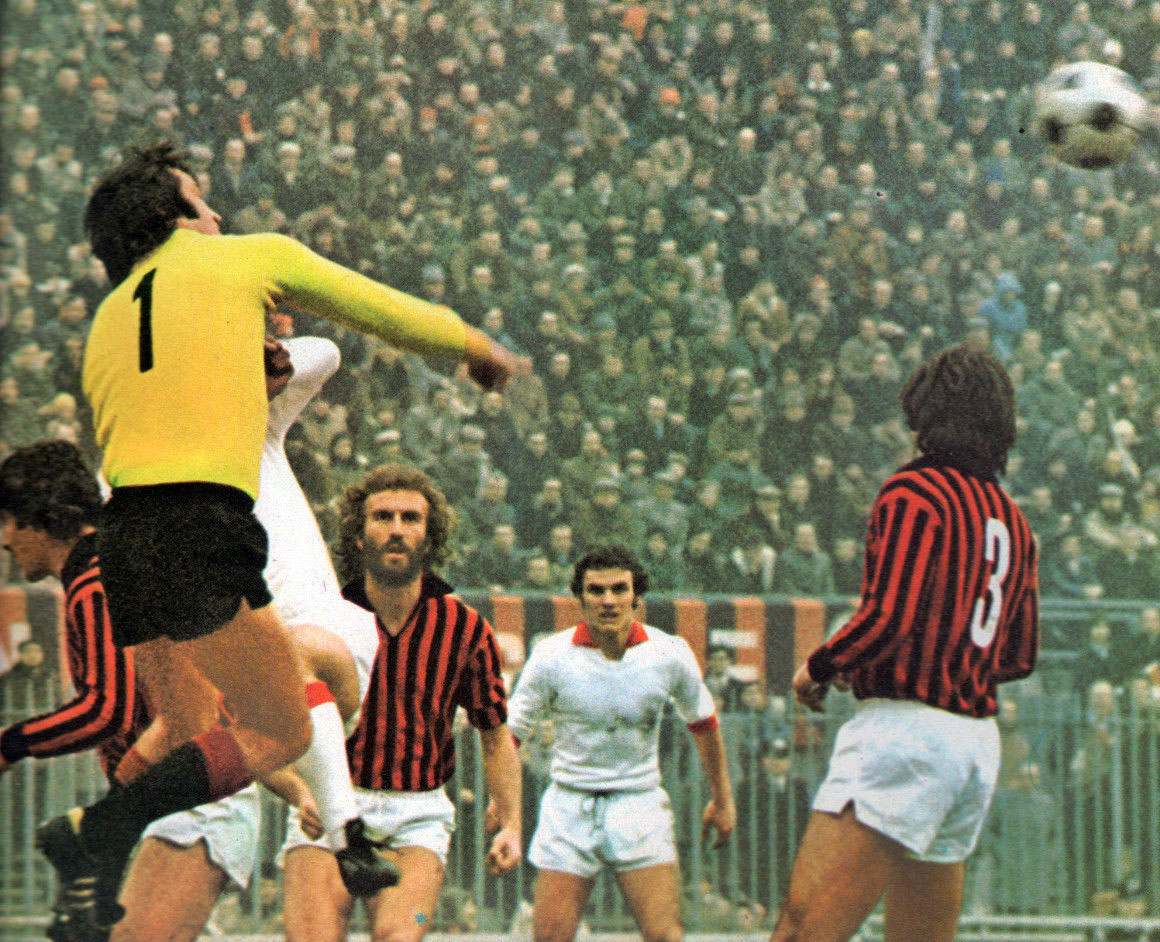
Albertosi (no. 1) in action with A.C. Milan at the San Siro during the 1974–75 season.

Albertosi was involved with the Italian "Totonero" betting scandal of 1980 and was ultimately suspended for two seasons. After Italy won the 1982 World Cup in Spain, the Italian football federation decided to let him play again. He ended his career in 1984, after playing two seasons with Elpidiense in Serie C2, at the age of 44. With 532 Serie A appearances, he is the 10th-highest appearance holder of all time in Serie A.

== International career ==
Albertosi made his debut for the Italy national team on 15 September 1961, in a 4–1 friendly victory against Argentina in Florence, under manager Giovanni Ferrari. His final international game took place in June 1972, when Italy drew 1–1 in a friendly match with Bulgaria, held in Sofia.

Under new manager Edmondo Fabbri, Albertosi became a regular in Italy's squad; he played his first World Cup with Italy in England 1966, where they were surprisingly and disappointingly knocked out in the first round. In the 1970 World Cup in Mexico, Albertosi was once again named Italy's starting goalkeeper, due to his excellent and consistent performances throughout the season with Cagliari. He started in all of Italy's matches, and was involved in the so-called "Game of the Century", when Italy played West Germany in the semi-final of the tournament; despite conceding three goals in this match, and some moments of hesitation and indecisiveness, Albertosi later won praise for a string of decisive acrobatic saves. He is also remembered for berating Gianni Rivera during the match, following the playmaker's error when defending a set-piece, which led to Germany's equaliser: Rivera briefly stepped away from the post, leaving it unmarked, and allowing Gerd Müller to score his second goal to tie the match at 3–3 in the 110th minute; Rivera later redeemed himself by scoring the match-winner a minute later. Albertosi later appeared in the 1970 World Cup Final, where Italy became tournament runners-up as they lost 4–1 to Brazil.

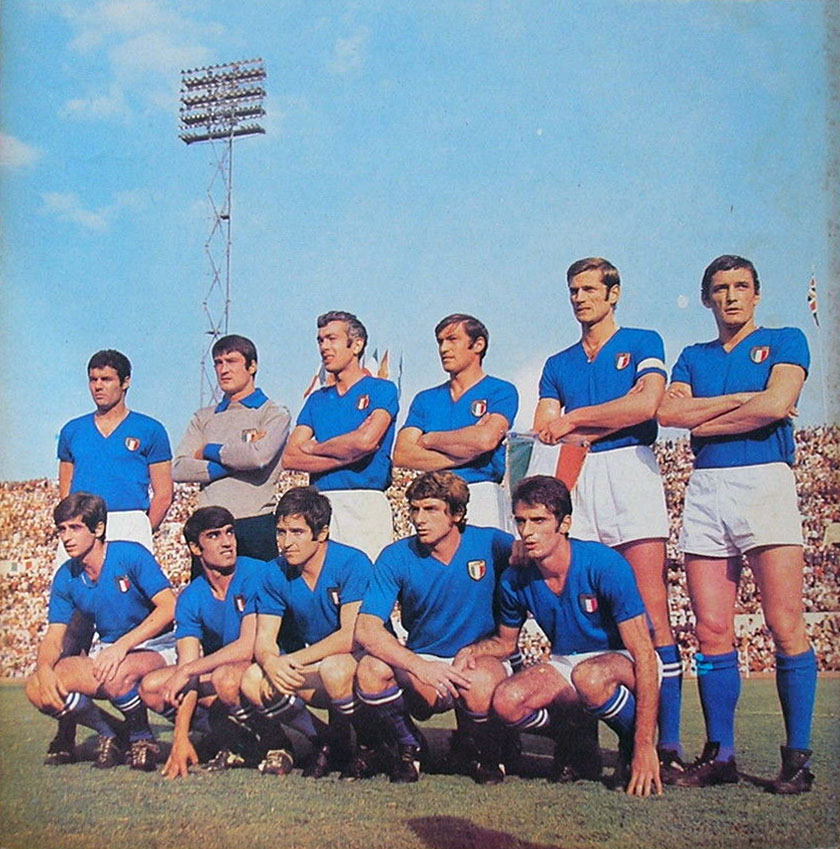
Albertosi (standing, second from the left) with the Italy national team in 1969

Albertosi was also an unused squad member in the 1962 World Cup in Chile under Ferrari, behind Lorenzo Buffon and Carlo Mattrel, and at the 1974 World Cup, behind his perceived career rival Dino Zoff, with whom he often faced competition for the Italy number 1 shirt due to the coaches' rotation policy. Albertosi was similarly an unused back-up goalkeeper behind Zoff at the 1968 European Football Championship, which Italy won on home soil, although he later managed to fight off competition from Zoff for a place in the starting line-up at the 1970 World Cup. He missed out on a place as Italy's third goalkeeper at the 1978 FIFA World Cup, however. In total, he played 34 times for the national team between 1961 and 1972.

== Style of play ==
Albertosi was a physically strong and athletic goalkeeper who was known for his eccentric personality and occasionally fiery temperament. He is regarded as one of the leading Italian goalkeepers of his generation and has been included among the country's greatest goalkeepers by football commentators and historians. Renowned for his reflexes, speed, agility, and shot-stopping ability, he was particularly noted for producing acrobatic and decisive saves. Although widely praised for his technical ability, longevity, and consistency, he was at times criticised for lapses in concentration and discipline, with some observers suggesting that his light-hearted character occasionally affected the consistency of his performances.

== Honours ==
=== Club ===
Fiorentina

- Coppa Italia: 1960–61, 1965–66
- UEFA Cup Winners' Cup: 1960–61
- Mitropa Cup: 1966

Cagliari

- Serie A: 1969–70

Milan

- Serie A: 1978–79
- Coppa Italia: 1976–77

=== International ===
Italy

- FIFA World Cup: Runner-up: 1970
- UEFA European Football Championship: 1968

=== Individual ===
- Fiorentina Hall of Fame: 2018
