= Sebastiano Rossi =

Italian footballer (born 1964)

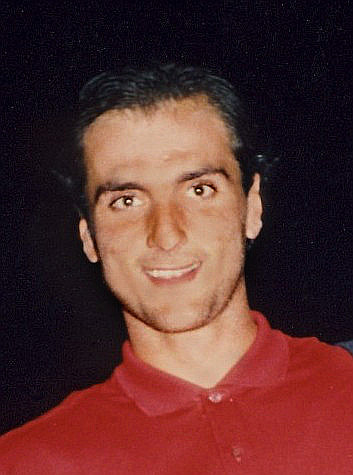
- Rossi in 1990

Personal information
- Date of birth: 20 July 1964 (age 62)
- Place of birth: Cesena, Italy
- Height: 1.97 m (6 ft 6 in)
- Position: Goalkeeper

Youth career
- 1979–1982: Cesena

Senior career*
Years	Team	Apps	(Gls)
1982–1990	Cesena	127	(0)
1982–1983	→ Forlì (loan)	11	(0)
1984–1985	→ Empoli (loan)	0	(0)
1985–1986	→ Rondinella (loan)	28	(0)
1990–2002	AC Milan	240	(0)
2002–2003	Perugia	12	(0)
Total		418	(0)
- * Club domestic league appearances and goals

Sebastiano Rossi (born 20 July 1964) is an Italian retired professional footballer who played as a goalkeeper.

During a 21-year professional career, he appeared in 346 Serie A games, most notably representing AC Milan (12 seasons) with which he won 12 major titles, including five national championships and the 1994 Champions League.

== Career ==
=== Cesena ===
Rossi joined his hometown's club, AC Cesena, in 1979, at the age of 15. In 1982–83, on loan, he made his senior debut with Forlì in the Serie C1, being backup in a relegation-ending season.

After two more loans, Rossi returned to Cesena for the 1986–87 campaign, only missing five games as the Emilia-Romagna club promoted to Serie A, and retaining first-choice status in the following three top division seasons, with the team finishing 12th in 1989–90; he made his debut in the competition on 13 September 1987, in a home match against SSC Napoli.

=== Milan ===
After his first season in Italy's top flight, Rossi was noticed by AC Milan and joined the Rossoneri (also dubbed the Dream Team) that dominated Italian football for much of the 1990s. In his debut campaign, he backed up Andrea Pazzagli, but the veteran left for Bologna FC 1909 in the ensuing summer.

Rossi then briefly battled for starting duties with Francesco Antonioli, before becoming Milan's undisputed first-choice goalkeeper, being part of a defensive line that included, amongst others, Mauro Tassotti, Franco Baresi, Alessandro Costacurta and Paolo Maldini, regarded as one of the greatest defensive units of all time. (Note: See) However, unlike the aforementioned defenders, Rossi wasn't selected to represent Italy in the 1994 FIFA World Cup, since former Milan coach Arrigo Sacchi, who was the commissioner of the Italy national team during this time, assigned the three goalkeeping spots to Gianluca Pagliuca, Luca Marchegiani and Luca Bucci. Under Sacchi, Rossi received two international call-ups by the end of 1994, but failed to make a single appearance for his country, although several pundits regarded him as a viable alternative to the then first-choice keeper Pagliuca; he still managed to have a successful club career under the tutelage of Fabio Capello, as the Invincibles went on a 58-match unbeaten run and won four Scudetti in five seasons, as well as the UEFA Champions League in 1994.

Following their 1996 Scudetto victory, Milan sharply declined thereafter, finishing 11th in 1997 and tenth in 1998, as Rossi's own career declined and saw him battling Massimo Taibi for the top spot. During round 17 of the 1998–99 season, Milan were leading AC Perugia 2–0 when they conceded a late penalty. After Hidetoshi Nakata converted it, teammate Cristian Bucchi was struck from behind by Rossi while retrieving the ball from the back of the net. Rossi was sent off and later was punished with a five-match ban.

After beating out newcomer Jens Lehmann (who would leave after playing only five matches) for the number-one jersey in 1998–99, Rossi was ultimately usurped by upstart Christian Abbiati, who had replaced him in the Perugia match.

=== Perugia and retirement ===
After the 2001–02 campaign, Rossi moved to Perugia, who were facing a goalkeeper crisis at the time. He contributed relatively as the team retained its top-level status, then retired at the end of that sole campaign at the age of 39.

Rossi made one final appearance for Milan at the San Siro, in a testimonial match for Demetrio Albertini, his teammate for eleven seasons. Subsequently, he worked as goalkeeper coach in the club's youth department.

== Style of play ==
Rossi was a tall, aggressive and physically strong goalkeeper who was known mainly for his confidence and command of the area, as well as his handling and ability to come off his line to collect crosses and high balls, due to his height and goalkeeping technique. He was also known for his vocal presence in goal, and his ability to organise his defence. Due to his good reactions, agility, athleticism and solid positioning, he was also an effective shot-stopper, and, despite his height, was gifted acrobatically and capable of getting to ground quickly to parry shots, which made him adept at saving penalties. Despite his talent, he was at times criticised for his volatile, arrogant and controversial character, however, which led him to pick up several cards throughout his career, as well as his tendency to commit occasional costly mistakes, which, along with his height and athleticism, earned him the nickname "l'ascensore umano" (the human lift).

Despite not being the most naturally gifted goalkeeper with the ball at his feet, Rossi possessed solid ball skills as well as a deep goal kick, and was also known for his distribution, as well as his pace when rushing off his line, which made him extremely effective in Milan's zonal marking system, and enabled his team to maintain a high defensive line.

== Records ==
Rossi held the record for the longest streak without conceding a goal in Serie A history. In an 11-match span, from 12 December 1993 to 27 February 1994, he kept a clean sheet for 929 consecutive minutes before being beaten by a long-range strike by US Foggia's Igor Kolyvanov; (Note: Gianpiero Combi's Italian league record unbeaten streak of 934 consecutive minutes without conceding a goal was set during the 1925–26 Prima Divisione season, prior to the establishment of the Serie A in the 1929–30 season.) he surpassed the previous mark set by Dino Zoff in 1972–73 by 26 minutes, and his own record of longest consecutive minutes without conceding was surpassed by Gianluigi Buffon on 20 March 2016, by 45 minutes.

Rossi holds the record for the longest streak without conceding a goal in away games in Serie A history, with 825 minutes (from 7 November 1993 to 27 March 1994).

Rossi also holds the record for the fewest goals conceded by a goalkeeper during a single 34-match Italian league season, with 11.

With 330 appearances for Milan, he is the club's second-most capped keeper of all time, behind only Christian Abbiati (380).

== Career statistics ==
Appearances and goals by club, season and competition
Club	Season	League			Cup		Europe (Note: Includes UEFA Champions League, UEFA Cup, and UEFA Super Cup)		Other (Note: Includes Italian Super Cup and Intercontinental Cup)		Total	
Club	Season	Division	Apps	Goals	Apps	Goals	Apps	Goals	Apps	Goals	Apps	Goals
Cesena	1981–82	Serie A	0	0								
Cesena	1983–84	Serie B	0	0								
Cesena	1986–87	Serie B	33	0								
Cesena	1987–88	Serie A	27	0								
Cesena	1988–89	Serie A	33	0								
Cesena	1989–90	Serie A	34	0								
Cesena	Total		127	0								
Forlì (loan)	1982–83	Serie C1	11	0								
Empoli (loan)	1984–85	Serie B	0	0								
Rondinella (loan)	1985–86		28	0								
AC Milan	1990–91	Serie A	9	0	8	0	1	0	0	0	18	0
AC Milan	1991–92	Serie A	30	0	2	0	0	0	0	0	32	0
AC Milan	1992–93	Serie A	27	0	6	0	6	0	0	0	39	0
AC Milan	1993–94	Serie A	31	0	0	0	13	0	2	0	46	0
AC Milan	1994–95	Serie A	34	0	0	0	13	0	2	0	49	0
AC Milan	1995–96	Serie A	34	0	0	0	0	0	0	0	34	0
AC Milan	1996–97	Serie A	26	0	3	0	6	0	1	0	36	0
AC Milan	1997–98	Serie A	17	0	10	0	0	0	0	0	27	0
AC Milan	1998–99	Serie A	13	0	3	0	0	0	0	0	16	0
AC Milan	1999–00	Serie A	5	0	4	0	0	0	1	0	10	0
AC Milan	2000–01	Serie A	14	0	2	0	1	0	0	0	17	0
AC Milan	2001–02	Serie A	0	0	5	0	1	0	0	0	6	0
AC Milan	Total		240	0	43	0	41	0	6	0	330	0
Perugia	2002–03	Serie A	12	0								
Career total			418	0								

== Honours ==
Milan

- UEFA Champions League: 1993–94
- UEFA Super Cup: 1990, 1994
- Intercontinental Cup: 1990
- Serie A: 1991–92, 1992–93, 1993–94, 1995–96, 1998–99
- Supercoppa Italiana: 1992, 1993, 1994

Individual

- AC Milan Hall of Fame
