= 1975–76 AC Torino season =

Associazione Calcio Torino
1975–76 season
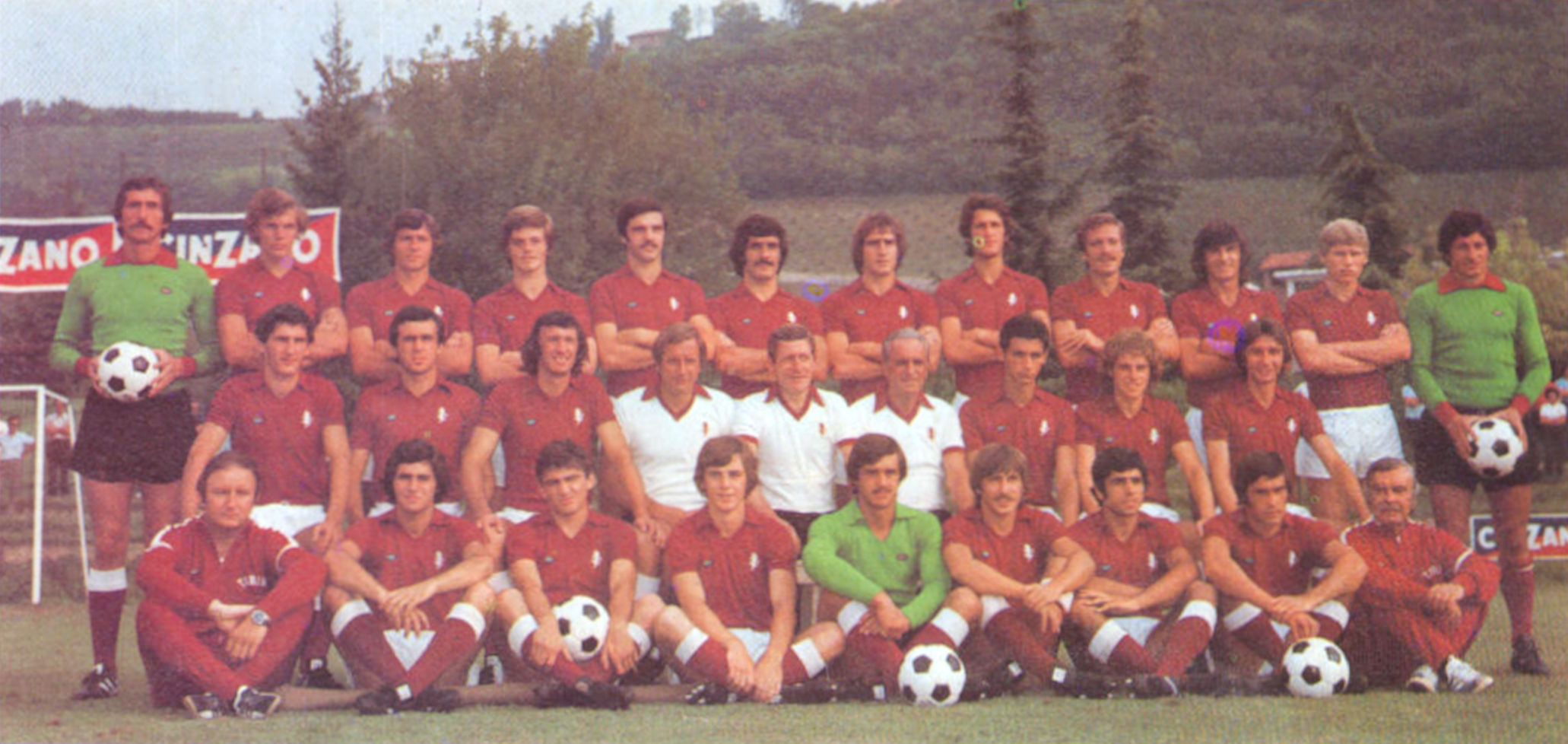
- Chairman: Orfeo Pianelli
- Manager: Luigi Radice
- Serie A: 1st (in European Cup)
- Coppa Italia: First round
- Top goalscorer: League: Pulici (21); All: Pulici (23)
- Highest home attendance: 64,733 vs Cesena (16 May 1976)
- Lowest home attendance: 11,599 vs Novara (14 September 1975)
- Average home league attendance: 39,145
Home colours	Away colours

In the 1975–76 season Associazione Calcio Torino competed in Serie A and Coppa Italia.

== Summary ==
The team placed first in the 1975–76 League season being their seventh Serie A title ever. The scudetto was won after a comeback against Juventus, who held a five-point advantage over the Granata during the spring. However, three straight losses for the Bianconeri, the second of which was in the derby, allowed Turin to overtake. In the final round, Torino held a one-point advantage and, until then, had won every previous home fixture. Torino hosted Cesena at the Comunale but could only manage to draw; Juventus, however, were defeated at Perugia. The title was won by two points ahead of Juventus, 27 years after the Superga tragedy.

== Squad ==
Note: Flags indicate national team as defined under FIFA eligibility rules; some limited exceptions apply. Players may hold more than one non-FIFA nationality.

Pos.	Nation	Player
GK	ITA	Luciano Castellini
GK	ITA	Romano Cazzaniga
GK	ITA	Mauro Pelosin
DF	ITA	Vittorio Caporale
DF	ITA	Fabrizio Gorin
DF	ITA	Marino Lombardo
DF	ITA	Roberto Mozzini
DF	ITA	Giuseppe Pallavicini
DF	ITA	Roberto Salvadori
DF	ITA	Nello Santin

Pos.	Nation	Player
MF	ITA	Roberto Bacchin
MF	ITA	Eraldo Pecci
MF	ITA	Giovanni Roccotelli
MF	ITA	Claudio Sala (Captain)
MF	ITA	Patrizio Sala
MF	ITA	Renato Zaccarelli
MF	ITA	Marzio Bertocchi
FW	ITA	Salvatore Garritano
FW	ITA	Francesco Graziani
FW	ITA	Paolino Pulici

=== Transfers ===
In
Pos.	Name	from	Cost
GK	Romano Cazzaniga	Taranto	Released
GK	Claudio Garella	Juniorcasale	loan ended
DF	Paolo Beruatto	Ivrea	loan ended
DF	Vittorio Caporale	Bologna	(U$0.158 million)
DF	Fabrizio Gorin	Lanerossi	(U$0.539 million)
MF	Roberto Bacchin	Rimini	
MF	Eraldo Pecci	Bologna	(U$1.111 million)
MF	Patrizio Sala	A.C. Monza	(U$0.365 million)
FW	Salvatore Garritano	Ternana	(U$1.111 million)

Out
Pos.	Name	to	Type
GK	Claudio Garella	Novara	loan
GK	Giuliano Manfredi	Modena	released
GK	Antonio Pigino	Sambenedettese	released
GK	Franco Sattolo		retire
DF	Paolo Beruatto	A.C. Monza	released
DF	Vito Callioni	Lanerossi	released
DF	Angelo Cereser	Bologna	released
MF	Aldo Agroppi	Perugia	released
MF	Giorgio Ferrini		retire
MF	Emiliano Mascetti	Hellas Verona	released
FW	Pierantonio Bortot	Cremonese	released
FW	Giovanni Quadri	Pistoiese	loan
FW	Ferdinando Rossi	Avellino	released

== Competitions ==
=== Serie A ===
==== League table ====
Pos	Team	Pld	W	D	L	GF	GA	GD	Pts	Qualification or relegation
1	Torino (C)	30	18	9	3	49	22	+27	45	Qualification to European Cup
2	Juventus	30	18	7	5	46	26	+20	43	Qualification to UEFA Cup
3	Milan	30	15	8	7	42	28	+14	38	Qualification to UEFA Cup
4	Internazionale	30	14	9	7	36	28	+8	37	Qualification to UEFA Cup
5	Napoli	30	13	10	7	40	27	+13	36	Qualification to Cup Winners' Cup

Source: Panini
(C) Champions

==== Results by round ====
Round	1	2	3	4	5	6	7	8	9	10	11	12	13	14	15	16	17	18	19	20	21	22	23	24	25	26	27	28	29	30
Ground	A	H	A	H	A	H	A	H	A	H	A	H	A	H	A	H	A	H	A	H	A	H	A	H	A	H	A	H	A	H
Result	L	W	D	W	D	W	D	W	W	W	W	W	D	W	D	W	L	W	L	W	D	W	W	W	W	W	D	W	D	D
Position	12	7	6	4	4	3	3	3	3	2	2	2	2	2	2	2	2	2	2	2	2	2	2	1	1	1	1	1	1	1

Source: Competitive matches
A = Away; H = Home; W = Win; D = Draw; L = Loss; = 1976–77 European Cup; = 1976–77 UEFA Cup

==== Matches ====
5 October 1975 1	Bologna	1–0	Torino	Bologna
15:00 UTC+1	Bertuzzo 65'	Report		Stadium: Comunale; Attendance: 31,002; Referee: Menegali

12 October 1975 2	Torino	3–0	Perugia	Turin
15:00 UTC+1	Pulici 26', 47', 73'	Report		Stadium: Comunale; Attendance: 20,201; Referee: Gussoni

19 October 1975 3	Ascoli	1–1	Torino	Ascoli Piceno
15:00 UTC+1	Gola 40'	Report	32' Pulici	Stadium: Stadio Cino e Lillo Del Duca; Attendance: 18,627; Referee: Menicucci

2 November 1975 4	Torino	2–1	Inter	Turin
14:30 UTC+1	Pulici 18'; Gorin 85'	Report	88' (pen.) Boninsegna	Stadium: Comunale; Attendance: 40,776; Referee: Michelotti

9 November 1975 5	Sampdoria	0–0	Torino	Genoa
14:30 UTC+1		Report		Stadium: Stadio Luigi Ferraris; Attendance: 29,152; Referee: Schena

16 November 1975 6	Torino	3–1	Napoli	Turin
14:30 UTC+1	Pulici 18', 28'; Punziano 70' (o.g.)	Report	24' Savoldi	Stadium: Comunale; Attendance: 44,335; Referee: Serafino

30 November 1975 7	Roma	1–1	Torino	Rome
14:30 UTC+1	Negrisolo 73'	Report	68' Graziani	Stadium: Olimpico; Attendance: 53,079; Referee: Agnolin

7 December 1975 8	Torino	2–0	Juventus	Turin
14:30 UTC+1	Graziani 75'; Pulici 78' (pen.)	Report		Stadium: Comunale; Attendance: 52,747; Referee: Michelotti

14 December 1975 9	Milan	1–2	Torino	Milan
14:30 UTC+1	Maldera 51'	Report	16' Zaccarelli; 84' Graziani	Stadium: San Siro; Attendance: 37,409; Referee: Ciacci

21 December 1975 10	Torino	1–0	Como	Turin
14:30 UTC+1	Graziani 47'	Report		Stadium: Comunale; Attendance: 29,924; Referee: Barbaresco

4 January 1976 11	Fiorentina	0–1	Torino	Florence
14:30 UTC+1		Report	38' Graziani	Stadium: Comunale; Attendance: 38,787; Referee: R. Lattanzi

11 January 1976 12	Torino	2–1	Lazio	Turin
14:30 UTC+1	Graziani 13'; Pulici 29'	Report	71' Re Cecconi	Stadium: Comunale; Attendance: 39,703; Referee: Reggiani

18 January 1976 13	Cagliari	0–0	Torino	Cagliari
14:30 UTC+1		Report		Stadium: Stadio Sant'Elia; Attendance: 28,252; Referee: Menicucci

25 January 1976 14	Torino	4–2	Hellas Verona	Turin
14:30 UTC+1	Graziani 63', 70'; Zaccarelli 73'; Pulici 85'	Report	67' Mascetti; 80' Catellani	Stadium: Comunale; Attendance: 30,283; Referee: Lenardon

1 February 1976 15	Cesena	1–1	Torino	Cesena
15:00 UTC+1	Zuccheri 41'	Report	25' Pecci	Stadium: La Fiorita; Attendance: 18,810; Referee: Menegali

8 February 1976 16	Torino	3–1	Bologna	Turin
15:00 UTC+1	Pulici 3', 77' (pen.), 43'	Report	51' Clerici	Stadium: Comunale; Attendance: 34,622; Referee: Agnolin

15 February 1976 17	Perugia	2–1	Torino	Perugia
15:00 UTC+1	Curi 27'; Scarpa 61'	Report	20' Pulici	Stadium: Comunale di Pian di Massiano; Attendance: 25,371; Referee: Alberto Michelotti

22 February 1976 18	Torino	3–1	Ascoli	Turin
15:00 UTC+1	Pulici 28' (pen.); C. Sala 35'; Graziani 88'	Report	4' Silva	Stadium: Comunale; Attendance: 29,935; Referee: Gialluisi

29 February 1976 19	Inter	1–0	Torino	Milan
15:00 UTC+1	Pavone 71'	Report		Stadium: Stadio San Siro; Attendance: 67,154; Referee: Ciacci

7 March 1976 20	Torino	2–0	Sampdoria	Turin
15:30 UTC+1	Graziani 55', 75'	Report		Stadium: Comunale; Attendance: 26,490; Referee: Menegali

14 March 1976 21	Napoli	0–0	Torino	Naples
15:30 UTC+1		Report		Stadium: Stadio San Paolo; Attendance: 73,889; Referee: Casarin

21 March 1976 22	Torino	1–0	Roma	Turin
15:30 UTC+1	Graziani 32'	Report		Stadium: Comunale; Attendance: 30,292; Referee: Bergamo

28 March 1976 23	Juventus	0–2	Torino	Turin
15:30 UTC+2	Bettega 70'	Report	2' (o.g.) Cuccureddu; 44' (o.g.) Damiani	Stadium: Comunale; Attendance: 66,762; Referee: Menicucci
Note: Awarded. Result assigned on table by decision of The Sport Justice Court, due to injuries on goalkeeper Luciano Castellini by Juventus fans throwinbg firecrackers. Score on field (1–2).

4 April 1976 24	Torino	2–1	Milan	Turin
15:30 UTC+2	Graziani 28'; Garritano 80'	Report	90' (pen.) Calloni	Stadium: Comunale; Attendance: 49,330; Referee: Menegali

11 April 1976 25	Como	0–1	Torino	Como
15:30 UTC+2		Report	10' Graziani	Stadium: Stadio Giuseppe Sinigaglia; Attendance: 21,061; Referee: Agnolin

18 April 1976 26	Torino	4–3	Fiorentina	Turin
15:30 UTC+2	Pulici 10', 75', 36'; Zaccarelli 57'	Report	18' Desolati; 49' (pen.) Casarsa; 82' Caso	Stadium: Comunale; Attendance: 46,528; Referee: Panzino

25 April 1976 27	Lazio	1–1	Torino	Rome
15:30 UTC+2	C. Sala 64' (o.g.)	Report	89' (o.g.) Re Cecconi	Stadium: Stadio Olimpico; Attendance: 42,594; Referee: Michelotti

2 May 1976 28	Torino	5–1	Cagliari	Turin
16:00 UTC+2	Pecci 38'; Graziani 50'; Zaccarelli 57'; Pulici 78', 83' (pen.)	Report	70' Leschio	Stadium: Comunale; Attendance: 47,582; Referee: Lazzaroni

9 May 1976 29	Hellas Verona	0–0	Torino	Verona
16:00 UTC+2		Report		Stadium: Stadio Marcantonio Bentegodi; Attendance: 42,659; Referee: Gussoni

16 May 1976 30	Torino	1–1	Cesena	Turin
16:00 UTC+2	Pulici 61'	Report	71' (o.g.) Mozzini	Stadium: Comunale; Attendance: 64,733; Referee: Casarin

=== Coppa Italia ===
==== First round ====
Pos	Team	Pld	W	D	L	GF	GA	GD	Pts
1	Hellas Verona (A)	4	3	1	0	7	2	+5	7
2	Torino (A)	4	3	0	1	7	3	+4	6
3	Catania (B)	4	1	2	1	2	4	−2	4
4	Cagliari (A)	4	0	2	2	2	5	−3	2
5	Novara (B)	4	0	1	3	2	6	−4	1

Source: rsssf.com
Rules for classification: 1) points; 2) goal difference; 3) number of goals scored.
(A) Serie A; (B) Serie B

27 August 1975	Hellas Verona	2–0	Torino	Verona
17:00 UTC+2	Moro 6'; Macchi 33'			Stadium: Marcantonio Bentegodi; Referee: Reggiani

1 September 1975	Torino	1–0	Cagliari	Turin
20:30 UTC+2	Pulici 69'			Stadium: Comunale; Attendance: 17,000; Referee: Vannucchi

14 September 1975	Torino	2–0	Novara	Turin
16:30 UTC+2	C. Sala 29'; Lombardo 71'			Stadium: Comunale; Attendance: 11,599; Referee: Bergamo

21 September 1975	Catania	1–4	Torino	Catania
17:00 UTC+2	Ciceri 18'		52' Mozzini; 58' Pecci; 62' Pulici; 90' Santin	Stadium: Stadio Cibali; Referee: Casarin

== Statistics ==
=== Player stats ===
No.	Pos	Nat	Player	Total		1975–76 Serie A		1975–76 Coppa Italia	
No.	Pos	Nat	Player	Apps	Goals	Apps	Goals	Apps	Goals
	GK	(Italy) ITA	Luciano Castellini	33	-24	29	-21	4	-3
	DF	(Italy) ITA	Vittorio Caporale	28	0	28	0		
	DF	(Italy) ITA	Roberto Mozzini	33	1	29	0	4	1
	DF	(Italy) ITA	Roberto Salvadori	33	0	30	0	3	0
	DF	(Italy) ITA	Nello Santin	29	1	25	0	4	1
	MF	(Italy) ITA	Eraldo Pecci	33	3	29	2	4	1
	MF	(Italy) ITA	Claudio Sala	32	2	29	1	3	1
	MF	(Italy) ITA	Patrizio Sala	30	0	30	0		
	MF	(Italy) ITA	Renato Zaccarelli	32	4	28	4	4	0
	FW	(Italy) ITA	Francesco Graziani	33	15	29	15	4	0
	FW	(Italy) ITA	Paolino Pulici	34	23	30	21	4	2
	GK	(Italy) ITA	Romano Cazzaniga	3	-1	1+2	-1	-0	0
	DF	(Italy) ITA	Fabrizio Gorin	15	1	9+3	1	3	0
	DF	(Italy) ITA	Giuseppe Pallavicini	6	0	2+2	0	2	0
	FW	(Italy) ITA	Salvatore Garritano	7	1	1+4	1	2	0
	DF	(Italy) ITA	Marino Lombardo	6	1	1+2	0	3	1
	MF	(Italy) ITA	Roberto Bacchin	1	0	0+1	0		
	GK	(Italy) ITA	Mauro Pelosin	0	0	0	0		
	FW	(Italy) ITA	Giovanni Roccotelli	0	0	0	0		

- Source: http://calcio-seriea.net/presenze/1975/757/
