= 1976–77 AC Torino season =

Associazione Calcio Torino
1976–77 season
- President: Orfeo Pianelli
- Manager: Luigi Radice
- Stadium: Comunale
- Serie A: Runners-up (in 1977-78 UEFA Cup)
- Coppa Italia: First round
- Top goalscorer: League: Graziani (21); All: Graziani (23)
- Highest home attendance: 66,012 vs Juventus (3 April 1977)
- Lowest home attendance: 6,000 vs Ascoli (19 September 1976)
- Average home league attendance: 40,513
Home colours	Away colours

In the 1976–77 season Associazione Calcio Torino competed in Serie A, Coppa Italia and European Cup.

== Summary ==
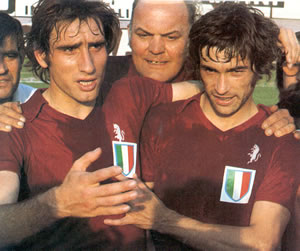
Francesco Graziani and Paolo Pulici, Torino's attacking duo in the 1976–77 season

During summer the club transferred in left-back defender Luigi Danova and midfielder Cesare Crotti. In League the team competed in a photo-finish race for the trophy against Juventus, being this race the most competed in League since the 1963-64 campaign (Bologna vs Inter) . However, both Juventus an Toro clinched more victories and points than other season of 30 rounds. The squad resented playing the European Cup and dropped few points, finally, in spite of only lost a match in the entire season and reaching a massive 50 points, Il Toro lost the trophy on the final round by just a single point against its archival Juventus.

== Squad ==
Note: Flags indicate national team as defined under FIFA eligibility rules; some limited exceptions apply. Players may hold more than one non-FIFA nationality.

Pos.	Nation	Player
GK	ITA	Luciano Castellini
GK	ITA	Romano Cazzaniga
GK	ITA	Iliano Riccarand
DF	ITA	Vittorio Caporale
DF	ITA	Fabrizio Gorin
DF	ITA	Luigi Danova
DF	ITA	Roberto Mozzini
DF	ITA	Roberto Salvadori
DF	ITA	Nello Santin

Pos.	Nation	Player
MF	ITA	Cesare Butti
MF	ITA	Eraldo Pecci
MF	ITA	Claudio Sala (Captain)
MF	ITA	Patrizio Sala
MF	ITA	Renato Zaccarelli
MF	ITA	Marzio Bertocchi
FW	ITA	Aldo Cantarutti
FW	ITA	Salvatore Garritano
FW	ITA	Francesco Graziani
FW	ITA	Paolino Pulici

=== Transfers ===
In
Pos.	Name	from	Cost
DF	Luigi Danova	Cesena	
MF	Cesare Butti	Cagliari	
GK	Claudio Garella	Novara	loan ended
FW	Giovanni Quadri	Pistoiese	loan ended

Out
Pos.	Name	to	Type
GK	Claudio Garella	SS Lazio	
GK	Mauro Pelosin	Vigevano	
DF	Marino Lombardo	Cesena Calcio	
DF	Giuseppe Pallavicini	Monza	
MF	Roberto Bacchin	Novara Calcio	
MF	Giuseppe Greco	Turris	loan
MF	Giovanni Roccotelli	Cagliari Calcio	
FW	Giovanni Quadri	Ascoli Calcio	

== Competitions ==
=== Serie A ===
==== League table ====
Pos	Team	Pld	W	D	L	GF	GA	GD	Pts	Qualification or relegation
1	Juventus (C)	30	23	5	2	50	20	+30	51	Qualification to European Cup
2	Torino	30	21	8	1	51	14	+37	50	Qualification to UEFA Cup
3	Fiorentina	30	12	11	7	38	31	+7	35	Qualification to UEFA Cup
4	Internazionale	30	10	13	7	34	27	+7	33	Qualification to UEFA Cup
5	Lazio	30	10	11	9	34	28	+6	31	Qualification to UEFA Cup

Source: Panini
(C) Champions

==== Results by round ====
Round	1	2	3	4	5	6	7	8	9	10	11	12	13	14	15	16	17	18	19	20	21	22	23	24	25	26	27	28	29	30
Ground	H	A	H	A	H	A	H	H	A	H	A	H	A	H	A	A	H	A	H	A	H	A	H	H	A	H	A	H	A	H
Result	W	W	W	W	W	D	W	W	W	W	D	D	D	W	D	W	W	L	W	W	W	D	D	W	W	W	D	W	W	W
Position	1	1	1	1	1	2	2	1	1	1	1	1	2	1	1	1	1	2	2	2	1	2	2	2	2	1	2	2	2	2

Source: Competitive matches
A = Away; H = Home; W = Win; D = Draw; L = Loss; = 1977–78 European Cup; = 1977–78 UEFA Cup

==== Matches ====
3 October 1976 1	Torino	3–1	Sampdoria	Turin
15:00 UTC+1	Graziani 4', 7'; Pulici 87'		50' De Giorgis	Stadium: Comunale; Attendance: 35,198; Referee: Benedetti

10 October 1976 2	Bologna	0–3	Torino	Bologna
15:00 UTC+1			26', 57' Graziani; 66' Garritano	Stadium: Comunale; Attendance: 38,715; Referee: Menegali

24 October 1976 3	Torino	2–0	AS Roma	Turin
14:20 UTC+1	Butti 28'; Pulici 86'			Stadium: Comunale; Attendance: 29,465; Referee: Menicucci

31 October 1976 4	Fiorentina	0–1	Torino	Florence
14:30 UTC+1			78' Graziani	Stadium: Comunale; Attendance: 35,313; Referee: Agnolin

7 November 1976 5	Torino	1–0	Inter	Turin
14:30 UTC+1	Pulici 85' (pen.)			Stadium: Comunale; Attendance: 46,132; Referee: Michelotti

21 November 1976 6	Perugia	1–1	Torino	Perugia
14:30 UTC+1	Novellino 83'		67' Pulici	Stadium: Comunale di Pian di Massiano; Attendance: 20,840; Referee: Casarin

28 November 1976 7	Torino	2–1	SSC Napoli	Turin
14:30 UTC+1	Graziani 13'; Zaccarelli 22'		20' Orlandini	Stadium: Comunale; Attendance: 50,333; Referee: Menegali

5 December 1976 8	Juventus	0–2	Torino	Turin
14:30 UTC+1			19' Graziani; 79' Pulici	Stadium: Comunale; Attendance: 66,340; Referee: Agnolin (Bassano del Grappa)

12 December 1976 9	Catanzaro	0–4	Torino	Catanzaro
14:30 UTC+1			9' Zaccarelli; 50' Santin; 70', 78' Graziani	Stadium: Comunale; Attendance: 20,159; Referee: Michelotti (Parma)

19 December 1976 10	Torino	2–0	Cesena	Turin
14:30 UTC+1	Graziani 17'; Pulici 89'			Stadium: Comunale; Attendance: 23,860; Referee: Barbaresco (Cormons)

2 January 1977 11	Hellas Verona	0–0	Torino	Verona
15:00 UTC+1				Stadium: Marcantonio Bentegodi; Attendance: 31,396; Referee: Bergamo (Livorno)

9 January 1977 12	Torino	3–3	SS Lazio	Turin
15:00 UTC+1	C. Sala 27'; Zaccarelli 50'; Salvadori 56'		8' Martini; 32', 66' Garlaschelli	Stadium: Comunale; Attendance: 36,672; Referee: Gussoni

16 January 1977 13	AC Milan	0–0	Torino	Milan
15:00 UTC+1				Stadium: San Siro; Attendance: 56,174; Referee: Menicucci

30 January 1977 14	Torino	1–0	Foggia	Turin
15:00 UTC+1	Zaccarelli 52'			Stadium: Comunale; Attendance: 36,471; Referee: Ciulli

6 February 1977 15	Genoa	1–1	Torino	Genoa
15:00 UTC+1	Arcoleo 32'		61' Pulici	Stadium: Luigi Ferraris; Attendance: 51,606; Referee: Ciacci

13 February 1977 16	Sampdoria	2–3	Torino	Genoa
15:00 UTC+1	Bresciani 50'; Zecchini 90'		21', 31', 70' Graziani	Stadium: Luigi Ferraris; Attendance: 30,895; Referee: Lattanzi (Roma)

20 February 1977 17	Torino	1–0	Bologna	Turin
15:00 UTC+1	Graziani 42'			Stadium: Comunale; Attendance: 36,027; Referee: Casarin

27 February 1977 18	AS Roma	1–0	Torino	Rome
15:00 UTC+1	Musiello 18'			Stadium: Olimpico; Attendance: 54,415; Referee: Michelotti

6 March 1977 19	Torino	2–0	Fiorentina	Turin
15:00 UTC+1	Mozzini 50'; Pulici 67'			Stadium: Comunale; Attendance: 44,482; Referee: Menegali

13 March 1977 20	Inter	0–1	Torino	Milan
15:00 UTC+1			6' (o.g.) Bini	Stadium: San Siro; Attendance: 73,910; Referee: Serafino

20 March 1977 21	Torino	2–1	Perugia	Turin
15:00 UTC+1	Pulici 3'; Salvadori 68'		55' Ciccotelli	Stadium: Comunale; Attendance: 24,371; Referee: Bergamo (Livorno)

27 March 1977 22	SSC Napoli	0–0	Torino	Naples
15:00 UTC+2				Stadium: Stadio San Paolo; Attendance: 74,404; Referee: Lattanzi

3 April 1977 23	Torino	1–1	Juventus	Turin
15:00 UTC+2	Pulici 8'		6' Causio	Stadium: Comunale; Attendance: 66,012; Referee: Casarin

10 April 1977 24	Torino	3–1	Catanzaro	Turin
15:00 UTC+2	Pulici 23' (pen.), 44'; C. Sala 76'		40' Arbitrio	Stadium: Comunale; Attendance: 39,722; Referee: Prati (Parma)

17 April 1977 25	Cesena	0–3	Torino	Cesena
15:00 UTC+2			16', 32', 34' Graziani	Stadium: Stadio La Fiorita; Attendance: 21,466; Referee: Menegali

24 April 1977 26	Torino	1–0	Hellas Verona	Turin
15:00 UTC+2	Pulici 22'			Stadium: Comunale; Attendance: 40,615; Referee: Panzino

1 May 1977 27	SS Lazio	0–0	Torino	Rome
16:00 UTC+2				Stadium: Olimpico; Attendance: 48,326; Referee: Michelotti (Parma)

8 May 1977 28	Torino	2–0	Milan	Turin
16:00 UTC+2	Graziani 59'; Pulici 70'			Stadium: Comunale; Attendance: 54,291; Referee: Lattanzi (Roma)

15 May 1977 29	Foggia	0–1	Torino	Foggia
16:00 UTC+2			78' Graziani	Stadium: Pino Zaccheria; Attendance: 21,319; Referee: Casarin (Milan)

22 May 1977 30	Torino	5–1	Genoa	Turin
16:00 UTC+2	Graziani 3', 57'; Pulici 13', 14'; Zaccarelli 87'		17' Ghetti	Stadium: Comunale; Attendance: 43,631; Referee: Bergamo

=== Coppa Italia ===
==== Group stage ====
Pos	Team	Pld	W	D	L	GF	GA	GD	Pts
1	Lecce	4	3	1	0	5	2	+3	7
2	Torino	4	2	1	1	9	4	+5	5
3	Foggia	4	1	2	1	4	5	−1	4
4	Taranto	4	0	2	2	2	5	−3	2
5	Ascoli	4	0	2	2	1	5	−4	2

1 September 1976 2	Taranto	1–1	Torino	Taranto
17:00 UTC+2	G. Gori 56'		52' P. Pulici	Stadium: Stadio Salinella; Attendance: 22,412; Referee: Menicucci

5 September 1976 3	Lecce	2–1	Torino	Lecce
17:00 UTC+2	Loddi 7'; Montenegro 52'		42' Pecci	Stadium: Stadio Comunale; Attendance: 27,000; Referee: Gussoni

9 September 1976 1	Torino	3–0	Foggia	Torino
20:30 UTC+2	Garritano 43', 77'; P. Pulici 66'			Stadium: Stadio Comunale; Attendance: 16,390; Referee: Bergamo

19 September 1976 5	Torino	4–1	Ascoli	Torino
20:30 UTC+2	F. Graziani 16'; Morello 46' (o.g.); Garritano 70'; Santin 90'		12' Ghetti	Stadium: Comunale; Attendance: 6,000; Referee: Lazzaroni

=== European Cup ===
==== Second round ====
15 September 1976 1	Torino (Italy)	2–1	(Sweden) Malmö FF	Turin
20:30 UTC+2	Mozzini 45'; Graziani 91'		88' Jönsson	Stadium: Comunale; Attendance: 57,726; Referee: (Turkey) Babacan

29 September 1976 2	Malmö FF (Sweden)	1–1	(Italy) Torino	Malmö
19:00 UTC+1	Ljungberg 57' (pen.)		3' P. Sala	Stadium: Malmö; Attendance: 16,373; Referee: (Scotland) Gordon

==== Eightfinals ====
20 October 1976 1	Torino (Italy)	1–2	(West Germany) Borussia Mönchengladbach	Turin
20:30 UTC+1	Wittkamp 64' (o.g.)		28' Vogts; 79' Klinkhammer	Stadium: Comunale; Attendance: 71,200; Referee: (Switzerland) Hungerbühler

3 November 1976 2	Borussia Mönchengladbach (West Germany)	0–0	(Italy) Torino	Düsseldorf
20:00 UTC+1				Stadium: Rheinstadion; Attendance: 64,389; Referee: (Belgium) Delcourt

== Statistics ==
=== Player stats ===
No.	Pos	Nat	Player	Total		Serie A		Coppa		European Cup	
No.	Pos	Nat	Player	Apps	Goals	Apps	Goals	Apps	Goals	Apps	Goals
	GK	(Italy) ITA	Luciano Castellini	35	-21	28	-14	3	-3	4	-4
	DF	(Italy) ITA	Vittorio Caporale	35	0	28	0	3	0	4	0
	DF	(Italy) ITA	Roberto Mozzini	35	2	27	1	4	0	4	1
	DF	(Italy) ITA	Roberto Salvadori	35	2	28	2	3	0	4	0
	DF	(Italy) ITA	Luigi Danova	36	0	28	0	4	0	4	0
	MF	(Italy) ITA	Eraldo Pecci	29	1	22+1	0	4	1	2	0
	MF	(Italy) ITA	Claudio Sala	31	2	25	2	3	0	3	0
	MF	(Italy) ITA	Patrizio Sala	33	1	26	0	3	0	4	1
	MF	(Italy) ITA	Renato Zaccarelli	36	5	30	5	2	0	4	0
	FW	(Italy) ITA	Francesco Graziani	38	23	30	21	4	1	4	1
	FW	(Italy) ITA	Paolino Pulici	36	18	29	16	3	2	4	0
	GK	(Italy) ITA	Romano Cazzaniga	5	-1	2+2	-0	1	-1	0	-0
	DF	(Italy) ITA	Nello Santin	15	2	12	1	2	1	1	0
	MF	(Italy) ITA	Cesare Butti	21	1	11+4	1	4	0	2	0
	DF	(Italy) ITA	Fabrizio Gorin	6	0	3+2	0	1	0	0	0
	FW	(Italy) ITA	Salvatore Garritano	12	4	1+7	1	2	3	2	0
	MF	(Italy) ITA	M. Bertocchi	1	0	0	0	1	0	0	0
	FW	(Italy) ITA	Aldo Cantarutti	1	0	0+1	0	0	0	0	0

- Source: http://calcio-seriea.net/presenze/1976/782/
