= Renato Zaccarelli =

Italian footballer

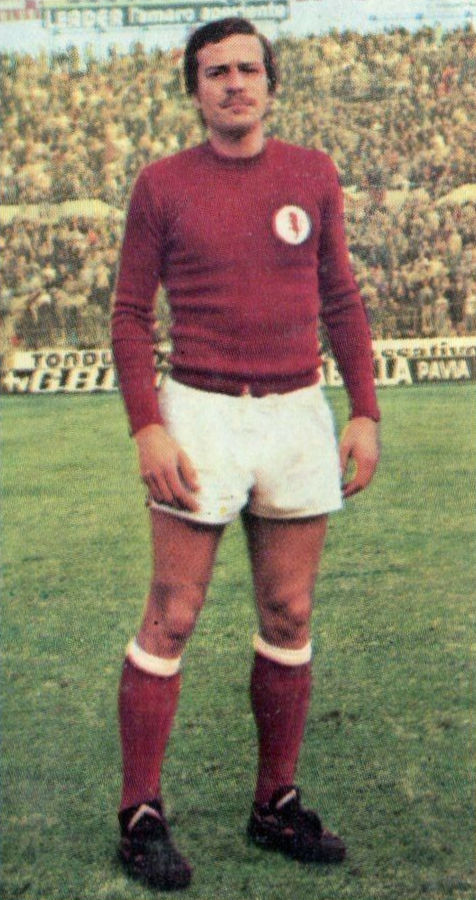
- Zaccarelli with Torino in 1974

Personal information
- Date of birth: 18 January 1951 (age 75)
- Place of birth: Ancona, Italy
- Height: 1.80 m (5 ft 11 in)
- Position: Midfielder

Youth career
- 1966–1968: Torino

Senior career*
Years	Team	Apps	(Gls)
1968–1969	Catania	2	(0)
1969–1970	Torino	0	(0)
1971–1973	Novara	52	(1)
1973–1974	Verona	30	(5)
1974–1987	Torino	317	(17)
Total		401	(23)

International career
1975–1980	Italy	25	(2)

Managerial career
- Italy U21 B
- Italy U21 (assistant)
- 2003: Torino
- 2004–2005: Torino
- * Club domestic league appearances and goals

Renato Zaccarelli (Italian pronunciation: [reˈnaːto ddzakkaˈrɛlli]; born 18 January 1951) is a former Italian professional footballer and manager who played as a midfielder.

== Club career ==
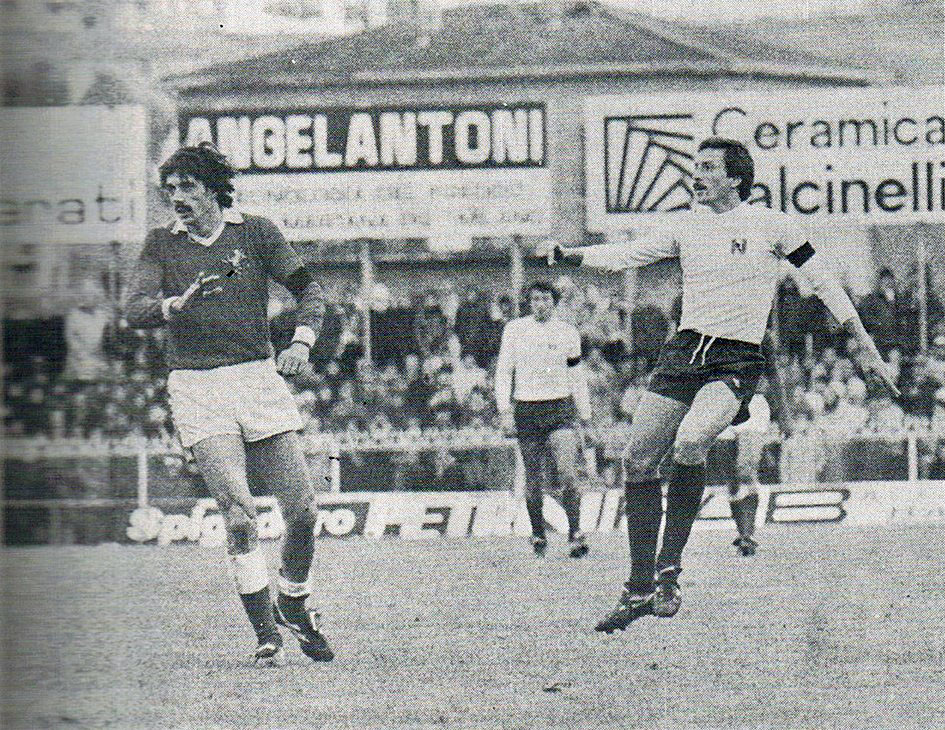
Zaccarelli (right) in action away to Perugia in 1976, battling his former teammate, Aldo Agroppi

After Giorgio Ferrini and Paolo Pulici, Zaccarelli is the third player with the most appearances for Torino in Serie A. He began his career in the youth ranks of Junior Ancona, a historical team in the doric district of Vallemiano; at age 15 he entered the Torino youth system, then was sold to gain experience in Serie B with Catania and Novara, up until his debut in Serie A with Verona in 1973. He returned to Turin in the summer of 1974; forming an exceptional midfield with Eraldo Pecci, Claudio Sala and Patrizio Sala the following season. He won the Scudetto with Torino in the 1975–76 season.

He retired at the end of the 1986–87 season with the Granata, having made 413 appearances and scored 21 goals in all competitions.

== International career ==
Zaccarelli represented the Italy national team for five years, making 25 appearances and scoring two goals. He participated at the 1978 FIFA World Cup in Argentina, where Italy finished fourth. He was played from bench as second to Giancarlo Antognoni, eventually making five appearances scoring one goal; that of a 2–1 comeback victory against France.

== Style of play ==
Zaccarelli was a traditional advanced playmaker, who was elegant, practical and a consistent performer in midfield. Towards the end of his career he was moved back on the pitch and reinvented himself as a libero, almost as an additional midfielder. In this role he lived a second youth, to the point he was awarded the Guerin d'Oro in 1986 as the best footballer of the 1985–86 season.

== Managerial career ==
After hanging up his boots, Zaccarelli alternated his managerial career with that of an executive. He was the director of football of Torino under the presidency of Roberto Goveani, then team manager under Gianmarco Calleri. In the 1992–93 season, he was named the director of football of Alessandria.

He began his managerial career in service of the Italy under-21 Serie B representative team, then was assistant coach of the Italy under-21. He returned to Torino in 2002 as head of the youth system, then as general manager in 2003, replacing Sandro Mazzola. He would later coach Torino during the 2002–03 season (succeeding Renzo Ulivieri) then in the 2004–05 Serie B season, taking over for Ezio Rossi prior to the promotion playoffs, won in the final against Perugia. The later would prove decisive for the fate of the club: while not being promoted to Serie A by virtue of the Covisoc decisions, Torino were subsequently allowed to stay in Serie B under the law Lodo Petrucci under the guidance of Urbano Cairo. In 2005–06 he moved to Bologna as the director of football.

== Honours ==
Torino

- Coppa Italia: 1970–71
- Serie A: 1975–76

Individual

- Guerin d'oro: 1986
- Serie A Team of The Year: 1986
