= Guerin d'Oro =

Annual award

- Sport: Association football
- Country: Italy
- Presented by: Guerin Sportivo

History
- First award: 1976
- Editions: 38
- Final award: 2015
- First winner: (Italy) Claudio Sala
- Most wins: (Italy) Claudio Sala; (Italy) Roberto Filippi; (Italy) Roberto Mancini; (Italy) Gianluca Pagliuca; (Italy) Francesco Totti; (Argentina) Carlos Tevez; (2 times each)
- Most recent: (Argentina) Carlos Tevez

The Guerin d'Oro (Golden Guerin) was an annual award which was handed out by the Italian magazine Guerin Sportivo to the best Serie A football player.

The first winner of the award was Claudio Sala, while the last was Carlos Tevez.

== History and regulations ==
Established 1976, the Guerin d'Oro was awarded to the player in Serie A with at least 19 games played, which had obtained the best average-media rating. The latter was obtained by calculating the average rating of each player's season, based on weekly rating reports of Guerin Sportivo and the three main Italian sports dailies: La Gazzetta dello Sport, Corriere dello Sport, and Tuttosport.

The award was suspended during the 2009–10 and 2010–11 seasons and discontinued after the 2014–15 season.

== Winners ==
Year	Player	Club	Ref(s)
1976	(Italy) Claudio Sala	Torino	
1977	(Italy) Claudio Sala	Torino	
1978	(Italy) Roberto Filippi	Vicenza	
1979	(Italy) Roberto Filippi	Napoli	
1980	(Italy) Luciano Castellini	Napoli	
1981	(Netherlands) Ruud Krol	Napoli	
1982	(Italy) Franco Causio	Udinese	
1983	(Italy) Pietro Vierchowod	Roma	
1984	(France) Michel Platini	Juventus	
1985	(Argentina) Diego Maradona	Napoli	
1986	(Italy) Renato Zaccarelli	Torino	
1987	(Italy) Walter Zenga	Internazionale	
1988	(Italy) Roberto Mancini	Sampdoria	
1989	(Germany) Andreas Brehme	Internazionale	
1990	(Italy) Franco Baresi	Milan	
1991	(Italy) Roberto Mancini	Sampdoria	
1992	(Netherlands) Frank Rijkaard	Milan	
1993	(Italy) Giuseppe Signori	Lazio	
1994	(Italy) Daniele Massaro	Milan	
1995	(Portugal) Paulo Sousa	Juventus	
1996	(Italy) Enrico Chiesa	Sampdoria	
1997	(Italy) Gianluca Pagliuca	Internazionale	
1997	(Italy) Angelo Peruzzi	Juventus	
1997	(France) Lilian Thuram	Parma	
1998	(Italy) Francesco Totti	Roma	
1999	(Argentina) Matías Almeyda	Lazio	
2000	(France) Sébastien Frey	Verona	
2001	(Italy) Roberto Baggio	Brescia	
2002	(Italy) Christian Vieri	Internazionale	
2003	(Czech Republic) Pavel Nedvěd	Juventus	
2004	(Italy) Francesco Totti	Roma	
2005	(Italy) Gianluca Pagliuca	Bologna	
2006	(Italy) Luca Toni	Fiorentina	
2007	(Romania) Adrian Mutu	Fiorentina	
2008	(Italy) Mauro Camoranesi	Juventus	
2009	(Argentina) Diego Milito	Genoa	
2010	Not awarded		
2011	Not awarded		
2012	(Italy) Andrea Pirlo	Juventus	
2013	(Uruguay) Edinson Cavani	Napoli	
2014	(Argentina) Carlos Tevez	Juventus	
2015	(Argentina) Carlos Tevez	Juventus	

== See also ==
- Gran Galà del Calcio
- Serie A Awards
- Serie A Footballer of the Year
