= Torino FC Hall of Fame =

- Sport: Association football
- Local name: Hall of Fame Granata (Italian)
- Country: Italy
- Presented by: Museo del Grande Torino e della Leggenda Granata

History
- First award: 2014
- Editions: 0
- Website: Official website

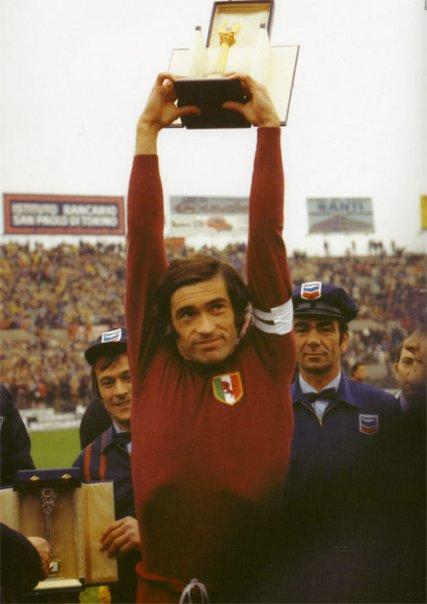
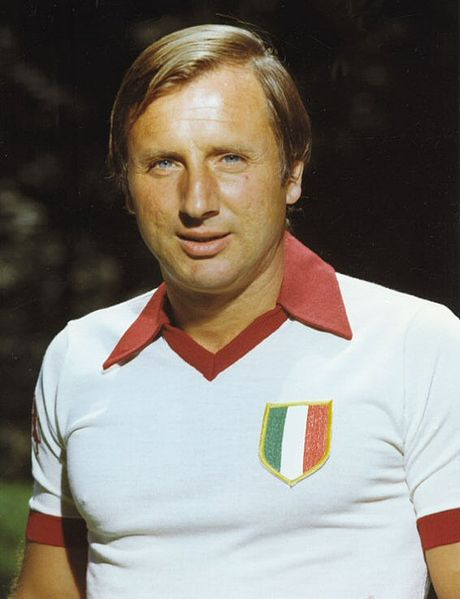
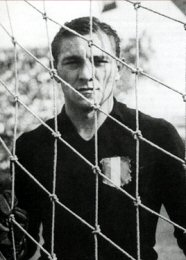
Four inductees (from the first in the heights to the left in a clockwise direction): Valentino Mazzola, considered one of the best Italian footballers of all time; Paolo Pulici, who was Capocannoniere thrice with Torino; Giorgio Ferrini, the most capped player in the history of Torino; Valerio Bacigalupo, the first goalkeeper to be inducted.

This is a list of Torino FC players who have been inducted into the Hall of Fame Granata.

== History ==
The Hall of Fame Granata (granata is the English for "maroon", the club's traditional colour) was created by the Museo del Grande Torino e della Leggenda Granata, which is run by the Associazione Memoria Storica Granata, an association of volunteer supporters who helped save the trophies and relics of the club during the demolition of the ancient Stadio Filadelfia, where they were kept. The Hall of Fame Granata was established in 2014 to celebrate those who have contributed in various ways to the history of the club. The award is divided into five categories: goalkeepers, defenders, midfielders, forwards, and special award (this category encompasses managers, presidents, directors, owners and people who contributed to raise and spread the spirit of the club in many ways).

== List of Hall of Fame inductees ==
=== Players ===
Positions key
GK	Goalkeeper
DF	Defender
MF	Midfielder
FW	Forward

Year	Player	Pos.	Torino career	Apps.	Goals	Honours with Torino	Ref.
2014	(Italy) Valerio Bacigalupo	GK	1945–1949	137	0	1945–46 Serie A, 1946–47 Serie A, 1947–48 Serie A, 1948–49 Serie A	
2014	(Italy) Virgilio Maroso	DF	1945–1949	103	1	1945–46 Serie A, 1946–47 Serie A, 1947–48 Serie A, 1948–49 Serie A	
2014	(Italy) Giorgio Ferrini	MF	1959–1976	566	56	1967–68 Coppa Italia, 1970–71 Coppa Italia	
2014	(Italy) Paolo Pulici	FW	1967–1982	437	172	1970–71 Coppa Italia, 1975–76 Serie A	
2015	(Italy) Alberto Fontana	GK	2002–2009	22	0	–	
2015	(Italy) Roberto Salvadori	DF	1973–1983	265	3	1975–76 Serie A	
2015	(Italy) Valentino Mazzola	MF	1942–1949	201	123	1942–43 Serie A, 1942–43 Coppa Italia, 1945–46 Serie A, 1946–47 Serie A, 1947–48 Serie A, 1948–49 Serie A	
2015	(Italy) Gigi Meroni	FW	1964–1967	122	25	–	
2016	(Italy) Luciano Castellini	GK	1970–1978	267	0	1970–71 Coppa Italia, 1975–76 Serie A	
2016	(Italy) Natalino Fossati	DF	1964–1974	336	14	1967–68 Coppa Italia, 1970–71 Coppa Italia	
2016	(Italy) Giuseppe Grezar	MF	1942–1949	159	19	1942–43 Serie A, 1942–43 Coppa Italia, 1945–46 Serie A, 1946–47 Serie A, 1947–48 Serie A, 1948–49 Serie A	
2016	(Italy) Claudio Sala	FW	1969–1980	360	33	1970–71 Coppa Italia, 1975–76 Serie A	
2017	(Italy) Aldo Agroppi	MF	1963–1975	280	26	1967–68 Coppa Italia, 1970–71 Coppa Italia	
2017	(Italy) Francesco Graziani	FW	1973–1981	289	122	1975–76 Serie A	
2019	(Italy) Enrico Annoni	DF	1990–1994	147	0	1992–93 Coppa Italia	
2019	(Italy) Pasquale Bruno	DF	1990–1993	106	1	1992–93 Coppa Italia	
2019	(Italy) Roberto Policano	DF	1989–1992	101	21	–	
2021	(Italy) Angelo Cereser	DF	1962–1975	311	5	1967–68 Coppa Italia, 1970–71 Coppa Italia	
2021	(Italy) Gianni Bui	FW	1970–1974	101	24	1970–71 Coppa Italia	
2022	(Italy) Eraldo Pecci	MF	1975–1981	203	16	1975–76 Serie A	
2023	(Italy) Luca Fusi	MF	1990–1994	169	3	1992–93 Coppa Italia	
2023	(Italy) Umberto Motto	DF	1942–1949	5	0	1948–49 Serie A	
2024	(Austria) Walter Schachner	FW	1983–1986	89	19	–	
2024	(Italy) Giacomo Ferri (Note: After retiring as a player, Ferri also spent seven years coaching Torino's youth teams, from the Giovanissimi up to the Primavera, with a spell in charge of the first team at the end of the 2002–03 season, when he replaced Renzo Ulivieri for the final six matches. Finally, from 2010 to 2016, he served as the club's team manager.)	DF	1976–1978; 1981–1989	223	3	–	
2024	(Italy) Enzo Bearzot (Note: After retiring as a player, Enzo Bearzot began his coaching career with Torino’s Giovanissimi, whom he led from 1964 to 1967.)	DF/MF	1954–1956; 1957–1964	263	8	–	

=== Special award ===
Year	Name	Notes	Ref.
2014	Luigi Radice	Manager of Torino F.C. from 1975 to 1980 and from 1984 to 1989; winner of 1975–76 Serie A	
2015	Aldo Rabino	Honorary President of Fondazione Stadio Filadelfia (2011–2015) and chaplain of Torino F.C. (1971–2015)	
2016	Antonio Vigato	Warehouse worker at Torino from 1953 to 2018	
2018	Emiliano Mondonico	Manager of Torino from 1990 to 1994 and from 1998 to 2000; winner of 1992–93 Coppa Italia	
2018	Gustavo Giagnoni	Manager of Torino from 1971 to 1974	
2018	Eugenio Bersellini	Manager of Torino from 1982 to 1984	
2019	Leslie Lievesley	Manager of Torino from 1948 to 1949; winner of 1948–49 Serie A	
2019	Ernő Egri Erbstein	Manager from 1938 to 1939 and sporting director of Torino from 1946 to 1949; winner of 1942–43 Serie A, 1942–43 Coppa Italia, 1945–46 Serie A, 1946–47 Serie A, 1947–48 Serie A, and 1948–49 Serie A	
2021	Giancarlo Bonetto	President of the Stadio Filadelfia Foundation's board of founders from 2011 to 2021	
2022	Cesare Salvadori	Former President of the Filadelfia Foundation	
2023	Angelo Marello	Historic supporter	
