= Catellani =

Catellani is an Italian surname. Notable people with the surname include:

- Andrea Catellani (born 1988), Italian footballer
- Sauro Catellani (born 1953), Italian footballer

== See also ==
- Catellani reaction, a chemical reaction
