= Gigi Meroni =

Italian footballer (1943–1967)

Luigi Meroni
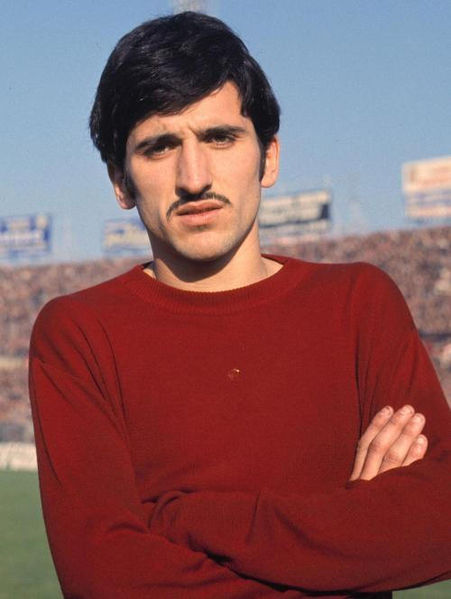
- Meroni with Torino

Personal information
- Date of birth: 24 February 1943
- Place of birth: Como, Kingdom of Italy
- Date of death: 15 October 1967 (aged 24)
- Place of death: Turin, Italy
- Height: 1.70 m (5 ft 7 in)
- Position: Winger

Youth career
- 19??–1960: Libertas San Bartolomeo
- 1960–1961: Como

Senior career*
Years	Team	Apps	(Gls)
1960–1962	Como	25	(3)
1962–1964	Genoa	42	(7)
1964–1967	Torino	103	(22)
Total		170	(32)

International career
1964	Italia B	2	(1)
1966–1967	Italy	6	(2)
- * Club domestic league appearances and goals

Luigi "Gigi" Meroni (Italian pronunciation: [luˈiːdʒi ˈdʒiːdʒi meˈroːni]; 24 February 1943 – 15 October 1967) was an Italian professional footballer who played as a winger. Throughout his career, he drew comparisons to George Best due to his playing style, appearance, and lifestyle.

He played 145 matches in Serie A, scoring 29 goals. At international level, he represented the Italy national team on six occasions between 1966 and 1967, scoring two goals, and took part in the 1966 FIFA World Cup.

== Club career ==
Meroni began playing football at the Oratorio di San Bartolomeo in Como. His father died when Meroni was two years old. His mother Rosa, a professional weaver, raised him and his two siblings, Celestino and Maria. Before his professional football career, Meroni worked as a designer of silk neckties and devoted time to painting.

His football career began in the Como youth sector, where he eventually made his first-team debut in the second division. He was subsequently transferred to Genoa. During the final match of the 1963–64 Serie A season, Meroni failed to undergo a doping control examination, stating he had forgotten the test in his hotel. Following positive tests for amphetamines among three other players, Meroni was suspended for the first five games of the following season.

In 1964, Meroni was sold to Torino, managed by Nereo Rocco. The transfer fee was 300 million lira, a record at the time for a 21-year-old player. At Torino, he earned the nickname la farfalla granata ("the maroon butterfly") in reference to his style of play, and the beatnik del gol ("the beatnik of the goal") for his artistic interests and nonconformist lifestyle. His personal life, including cohabiting with Cristiana Uderstadt, a young woman separated and awaiting a declaration of nullity from the Roman Rota, was considered controversial in Italy at the time.

On the pitch, he formed a successful attacking partnership with striker Nestor Combin. When cross-city rivals Juventus made an offer of 750 million lire for Meroni, Torino president Orfeo Pianelli declined the bid following intense protests from Torino fans.

In 1967, Meroni scored a notable goal against Inter Milan at the San Siro. After dribbling from the edge of the box, he lobbed the ball into the top corner, ending a three-year unbeaten home record for manager Helenio Herrera's Grande Inter team.

== International career ==
Meroni made six appearances for the Italy national team between 1966 and 1967, scoring two goals. He made his debut on 19 March 1966 in a 0–0 away draw against France. He scored his first international goal in Bologna on 14 June 1966 during a 6–1 friendly victory over Bulgaria in preparation for the 1966 FIFA World Cup. He scored his second goal eight days later in a 3–0 friendly win over Argentina in Turin.

Meroni was included in manager Edmondo Fabbri's squad for the 1966 World Cup in England, a tournament that ended with Italy's elimination in the first round following a 1–0 defeat to North Korea. Due to disagreements with Fabbri, Meroni made only one appearance in the tournament, playing in the second group-stage match against the Soviet Union.

== Style of play ==
Nicknamed La Farfalla Granata ("The Maroon Butterfly", as maroon is the color associated with Torino), Meroni was a right winger who wore the number 7 shirt. Known for his slender build, he was highly regarded for his dribbling ability, acceleration, and technical skills, which frequently allowed him to beat defenders in one-on-one situations. Because of his playing position, style, physical appearance, and off-pitch lifestyle, Meroni was frequently compared to George Best by the Italian media. He was considered to be a promising player in the media, and is retroactively thought to have had the potential to develop into one of Italy's greatest wingers ever, alongside the likes of Bruno Conti, Franco Causio, Claudio Sala, and Roberto Donadoni, which whom he has often been compared.

== Death ==
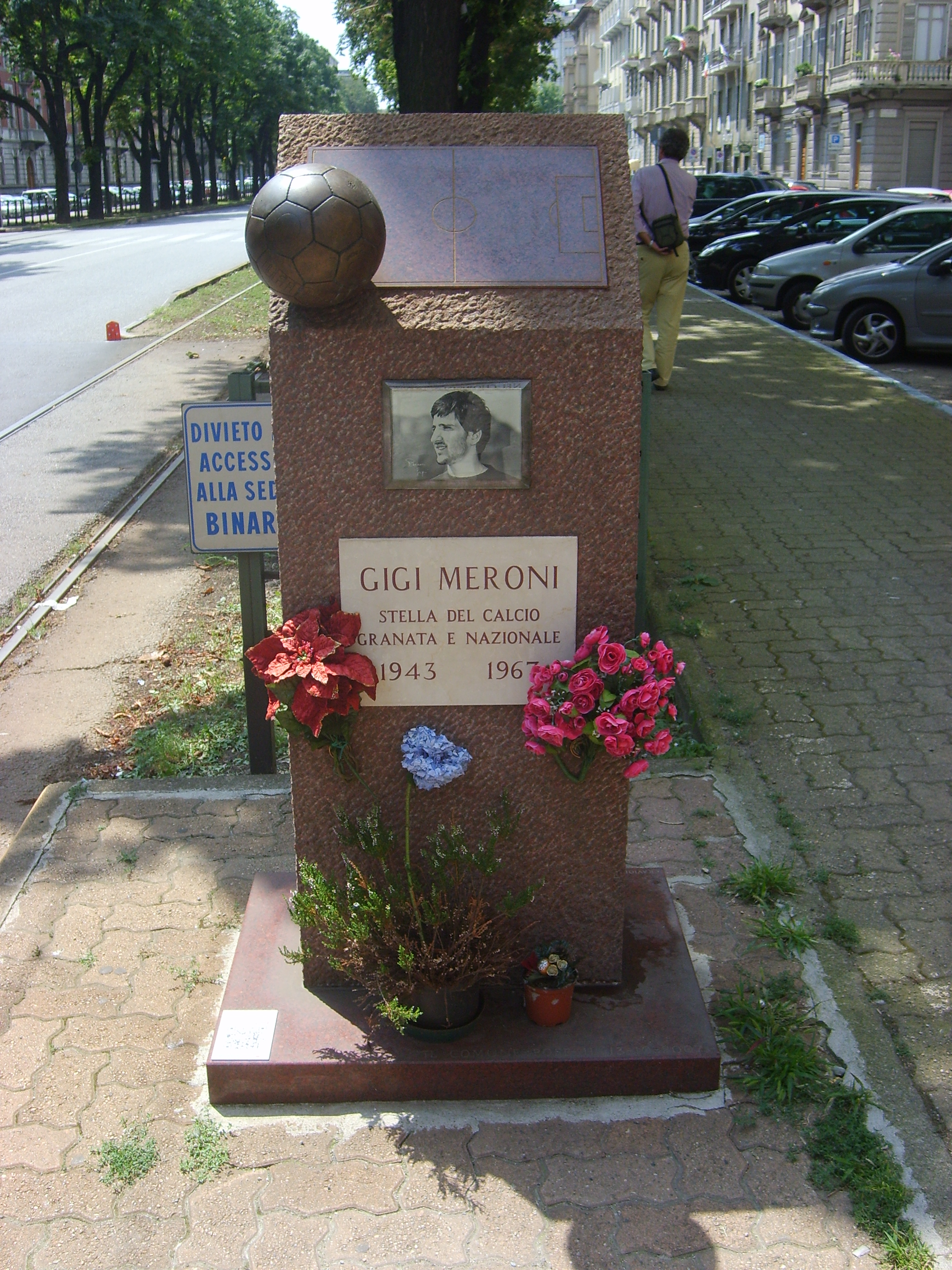
Commemorative plaque at the site of the accident, Corso Re Umberto number 46

On 15 October 1967, Meroni died at the age of 24. Shortly after playing in a 4–2 victory over Sampdoria (during which he had been sent off), Meroni was struck by a car while crossing Corso Re Umberto in Turin with his friend and Torino teammate Fabrizio Poletti. The driver of the vehicle was Attilio Romero, a 19-year-old Torino fan who would later become the club's president in 2000.

== Honours ==
Genoa

- Coppa delle Alpi: 1964

Individual

- Torino FC Hall of Fame: 2015
