= Roberto Filippi =

Italian footballer and manager

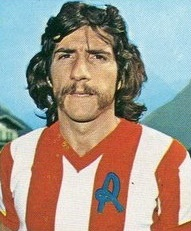
- Roberto "Pippo" Filippi

Personal information
- Date of birth: 30 July 1948
- Place of birth: Padua
- Height: 1.69 m (5 ft 7 in)
- Position: Midfielder

Senior career*
Years	Team	Apps	(Gls)
1968–1969	Chioggia Sottomarina	33	(7)
1969–1972	Padova	109	(7)
1972	Bologna	3	(0)
1972–1974	Reggina	50	(2)
1974–1976	Padova	34	(0)
1976–1978	Lanerossi Vicenza	98	(2)
1978–1980	Napoli	55	(1)
1980–1981	Atalanta	28	(1)
1981–1983	Cesena	53	(0)
1983–1987	Lanerossi Vicenza	102	(2)

Managerial career
- 1991–1992: Treviso
- Pro Gorizia
- Luparense
- 2008: Piovese
- 2009–2010: Thermal Abano
- 2009–2010: Campodarsego
- * Club domestic league appearances and goals

Roberto "Pippo" Filippi (born 30 July 1948), also known as Pippo Filippi, is an Italian former professional footballer and manager who played as a midfielder.

Roberto Filippi was the second player to win Guerin d'Oro two consecutive seasons (1978 and 1979), awarded to the player with the highest average rating in a single Serie A season.

== Playing career ==
=== Club ===
Roberto Filippi played in Serie A with Bologna, Lanerossi Vicenza, Napoli and Cesena.

=== International ===
Despite his ability and performances at club level, Filippi was never capped for the Italy national football team, and he is considered one of Italy's greatest players to have never played for the national side.

== Style of play ==
A highly recognisable player due to his trademark long haircut, Filippi was a small yet energetic midfielder with a light, slender build, but who was known for his consistency, as well as his outstanding stamina, tireless runs in midfield, and work-rate, which enabled him to cover the pitch effectively. He usually played as a central or defensive midfielder, where he functioned as a ball-winner, although he also possessed good feet in spite of his playing role.

== Management career ==
Filippi managed Treviso, Pro Gorizia, Luparense, Piovese, Thermal Abano, and Campodarsego.

== Honours ==
=== Club ===
Lanerossi Vicenza

- Serie B: 1976–77

=== Individual ===
- Guerin d'Oro: 1978, 1979
