= Rabona =

Association football tactic

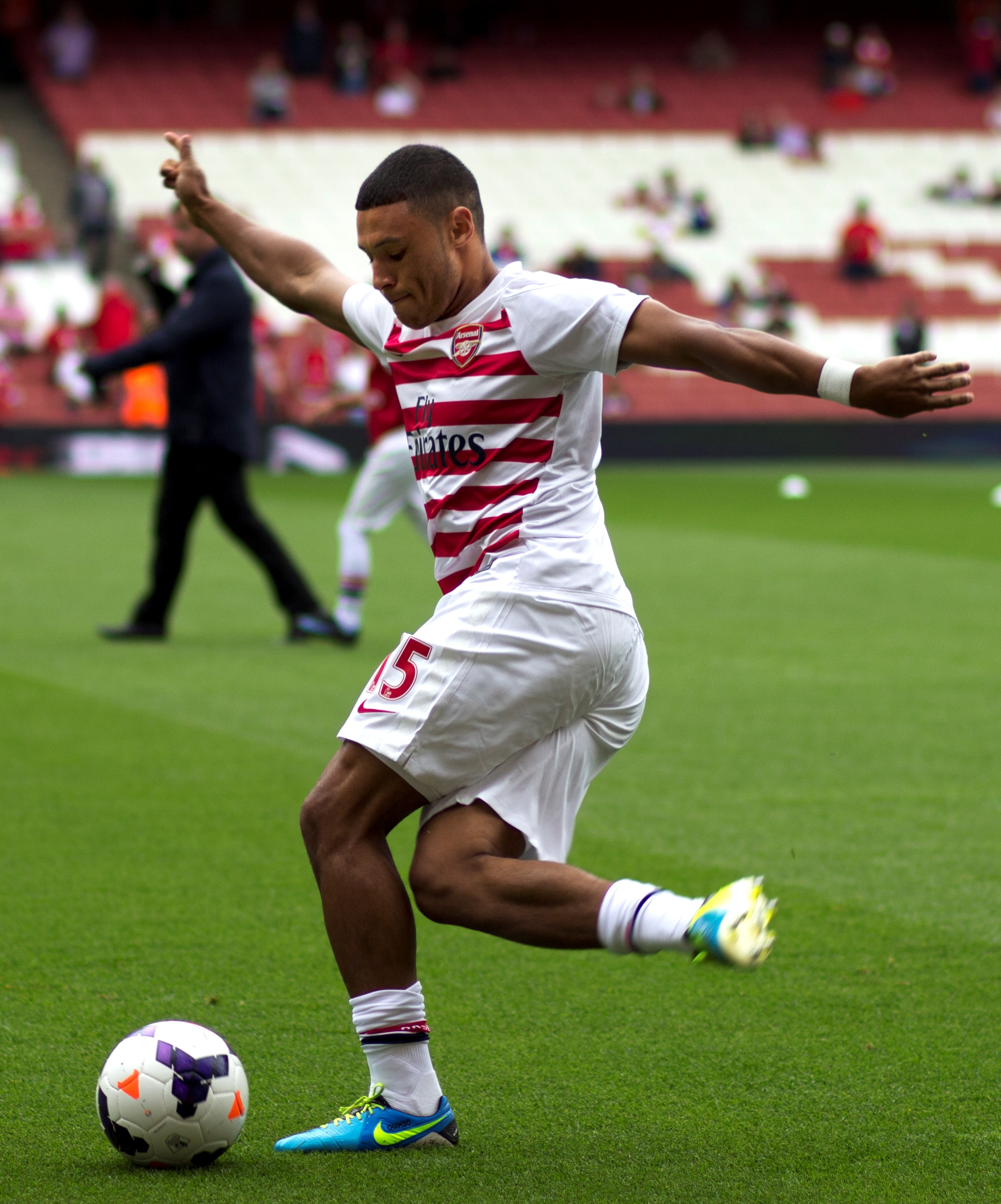
Alex Oxlade-Chamberlain performing a rabona while warming up for Arsenal in 2013

In association football, the rabona is the technique of kicking the football where the kicking leg is crossed behind the back of the standing leg.

There are several reasons why a player might opt to strike the ball this way: for example, a right-footed striker advancing towards the goal slightly on the left side rather than having the goal straight in front may feel that his shot power or accuracy with his left foot is inadequate (more colloquially, the player has "no left"), so will perform a rabona in order to take a better shot. Another scenario could be a right-footed winger sending a cross while playing on the left side of the pitch without having to turn first. Another reason why a player could perform a rabona might be to confuse a defending player, or simply to show off their own ability, as it is considered a skillful trick at any level.

== History ==
Rabona in Spanish means to play hooky, to skip school. The name derives from its first documented performance by Ricardo Infante in a game between Estudiantes de la Plata and Rosario Central in 1948. The football magazine El Gráfico published a front cover showing Infante dressed as a schoolboy with the caption "El infante que se hizo la rabona" (In English: "The kid who played hooky"). Another supposed origin for the name is that Rabona is derived from the Spanish word rabo for tail, and that the move resembled the swishing of a cow's tail between or around its legs. In Brazil, the move is also known as the chaleira (kettle) or letra (letter).

The first filmed rabona was performed by Brazilian footballer Pelé in the São Paulo state championship in 1957. Giovanni "Cocò" Roccotelli is credited with popularising the rabona in Italy during the 1970s; at the time, this move was simply called a "crossed-kick" (incrociata, in Italian).

== Other sports and uses ==
=== American football ===
- The first known use of the rabona in American football was by Dallas Cowboys placekicker Toni Fritsch, who was a former soccer player. He used it late in the fourth quarter of the 1972 NFC Divisional playoffs during an onside kick, that contributed to a historic come from behind 30–28 victory against the San Francisco 49ers.
- Placekicker Chris Boswell successfully executed a rabona onside kick for Rice University in a loss against the University of Houston on September 21, 2013. Boswell had learned the trick from his father, who grew up playing association football in Brazil. When playing for the Pittsburgh Steelers on November 6, 2016, Boswell used the rabona to attempt an onside kick against the Baltimore Ravens, which was recovered by the defense.
- In the 2015 Alamo Bowl, Kansas State University placekicker Matthew McCrane successfully executed a rabona kick, though it was recovered by their opponents, the UCLA Bruins.
- On October 30, 2022, New York Jets punter/kickoff specialist Braden Mann unsuccessfully attempted a rabona onside kick against the New England Patriots in a 22–17 loss.

=== Other uses ===
- The rabona is a dance step used in the tango. The dance step takes its name from the football kick.
- In Argentina and Bolivia the term "rabona" refers to camp followers, women who followed the army, cooking and serving their husbands, fathers and partners who were soldiers, providing nursing services, carrying their arms and munitions, and gathering intelligence which could assist the military.

== See also ==
- Step over
- Runaround move
- Cruyff turn
- Trivela
