= Luciano Castellini =

Italian footballer (born 1945)

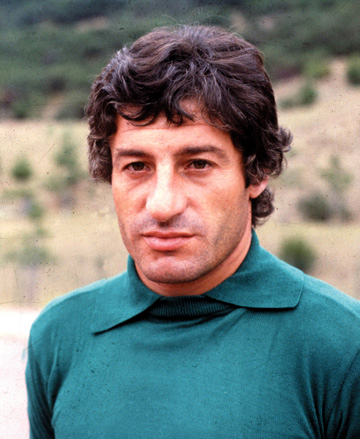
- Castellini in circa 1977

Personal information
- Date of birth: 12 December 1945 (age 80)
- Place of birth: Milan, Italy
- Position: Goalkeeper

Youth career
- 1960–1965: Monza

Senior career*
Years	Team	Apps	(Gls)
1965–1970	Monza	60	(0)
1970–1978	Torino	201	(0)
1978–1985	Napoli	202	(1)
Total		463	(1)

International career
1977	Italy	1	(0)

Managerial career
- 1997: Inter Milan
- 1999: Inter Milan
- * Club domestic league appearances and goals

Luciano Castellini (Italian pronunciation: [luˈtʃaːno kastelˈliːni]; born 12 December 1945) is an Italian former football manager and former football player who played as a goalkeeper.

== Club career ==
Castellini was born in Milan. During his club career he initially played for Monza (1965–70), winning the Serie C title, and promotion to Serie B during the 1966–67 season. He later made his Serie A debut with Torino (1970–78) on 30 August 1970, in a 1–0 away win over Ternana; during his time with the club, he won the Coppa Italia in 1971, and the Serie A during the 1975–76 season, collecting 201 Serie A appearances over eight seasons with the club, and 267 club appearances across all competitions.

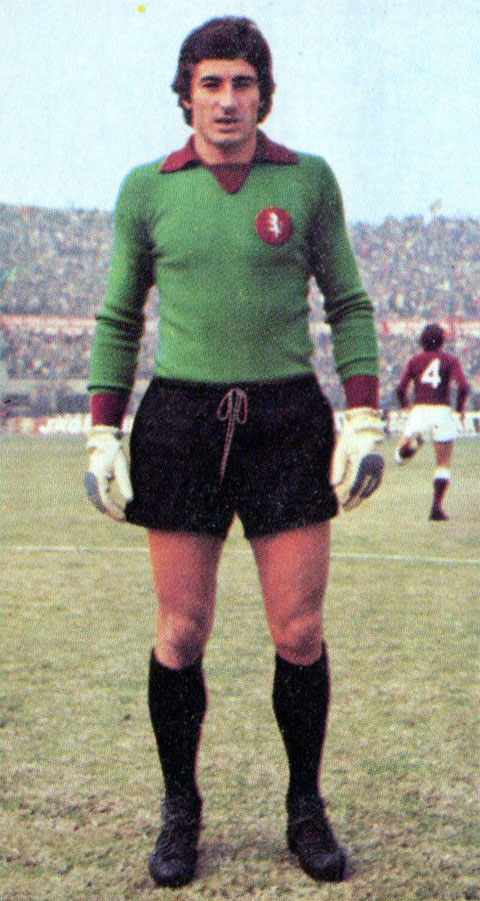
Castellini with Torino in 1974–75 season

He ended his career with Napoli (1978–85), after seven seasons with the club, collecting 203 appearances in Serie A. In total, he made 404 appearances in Serie A, and he is one of the few players to have made over 200 appearances with two different clubs, which he managed both with Torino and Napoli. During his third season with Napoli, Castellini went unbeaten for 531 consecutive minutes, which at the time, was a record bettered only by Dino Zoff, who had gone unbeaten for 590 minutes.

== International career ==
Castellini was included in the Italy national team for the 1974 FIFA World Cup; he was an unused substitute, behind Dino Zoff and Enrico Albertosi, who kept him out of the national side. He earned the only international cap in his career on 26 January 1977, coming on as a substitute in a 2–1 win over Belgium.

== Managerial career ==
In 1997, he coached Inter for the last two Serie A matches, after the dismissal of Roy Hodgson, helping the club to a third-place finish in Serie A. He is currently a member of the Italy U21 staff, and he has also worked with the Inter youth side as a goalkeeping coach, and as a scout, since 1989.

== Style of play ==
Castellini was an agile, courageous, flexible, and acrobatic goalkeeper, who possessed excellent reflexes, and who excelled in the air due to his athletic ability; he was also known for his speed when rushing off his line, as well as his ability to come out and punch the ball out of the area. During his time at Torino, he was given the nickname "The Jaguar" by the fans, due to his diving and shot-stopping ability. Considered one of the best Italian goalkeepers of his generation, he is also regarded by many pundits and fans as one of Torino's best goalkeepers, and also as Napoli's greatest goalkeeper of all time, despite being unable to win a trophy with the latter club, and was awarded the league's "Best goalkeeper" award by Guerin Sportivo on several occasions for his performances.

== Honours ==
Torino

- Serie A: 1975–76
- Coppa Italia: 1970–71

Monza

- Serie C: 1966–67

Individual

- Guerin d'Oro: 1980
- Serie A Team of The Year: 1982
- Torino FC Hall of Fame: 2016
