= Roberto Salvadori =

Italian footballer and manager

Personal information
- Date of birth: 29 July 1950 (age 76)
- Place of birth: Magenta, Italy
- Height: 1.77 m (5 ft 10 in)
- Position: Full-back

Youth career
- Magenta

Senior career*
Years	Team	Apps	(Gls)
1969–1972	Verbania		
1972–1973	Alessandria		
1973–1983	Torino	198	(3)
1983–1984	Alessandria		
- * Club domestic league appearances and goals

Roberto Salvadori (born 29 July 1950) is a former Italian professional footballer who played as a full-back.

In 2015, he was inducted into Torino FC Hall of Fame.

== Career ==
In his youth, Mazzoni played for Magenta.

In 1969, he was bought by Verbania, where he spent three seasons before being bought by Alessandria. In Alessandria, he spent one season, winning the 1972–73 Coppa Italia Serie C.

He was then bought by Torino for ₤290 million, where he played from 1973 to 1983, making a total of 265 appearances and scoring 3 goals. With Torino, he won the 1975–76 Serie A, to which he contributed by playing all 30 league games.

He ended his career at Alessandria in 1984.

== Honours ==
=== Player ===
Alessandria

- Coppa Italia Serie C: 1972–73

Torino

- Serie A: 1975–76

=== Individual ===
- Torino FC Hall of Fame: 2015
