= Emiliano Mascetti =

Italian footballer and football executive (1943–2022)

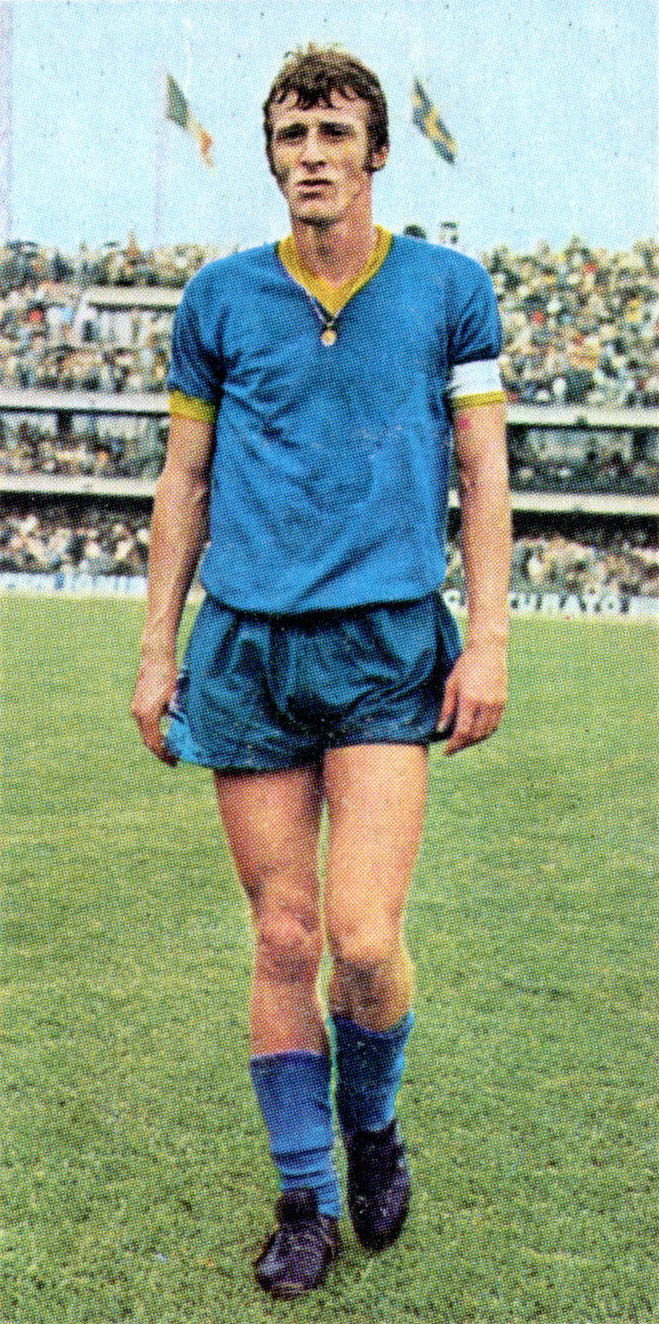
- Mascetti playing for Verona in 1970

Personal information
- Date of birth: 11 March 1943
- Place of birth: Como, Italy
- Date of death: 6 April 2022 (aged 79)
- Place of death: Verona, Italy
- Position: Midfielder

Youth career
- Como

Senior career*
Years	Team	Apps	(Gls)
1961–1965	Como		
1965–1967	Pisa		
1967–1973	Verona		
1973–1975	Torino		
1975–1980	Verona		
- * Club domestic league appearances and goals

Emiliano Mascetti (11 March 1943 – 6 April 2022) was an Italian footballer, who played as a midfielder, and football executive.

== Playing career ==
Born in Como, Mascetti played for Como, Pisa, Verona and Torino. He spent 11 seasons with Verona and held the club's record for goals scored in Serie A with 35 until he was surpassed by Luca Toni in 2015. He scored a total of 46 goals for the club in 330 appearances.

== After retirement ==
After retiring as a player, Mascetti worked for Verona as a sporting director, and also held roles at Roma and Atalanta.
