= Eraldo Pecci =

Italian footballer (born 1955)

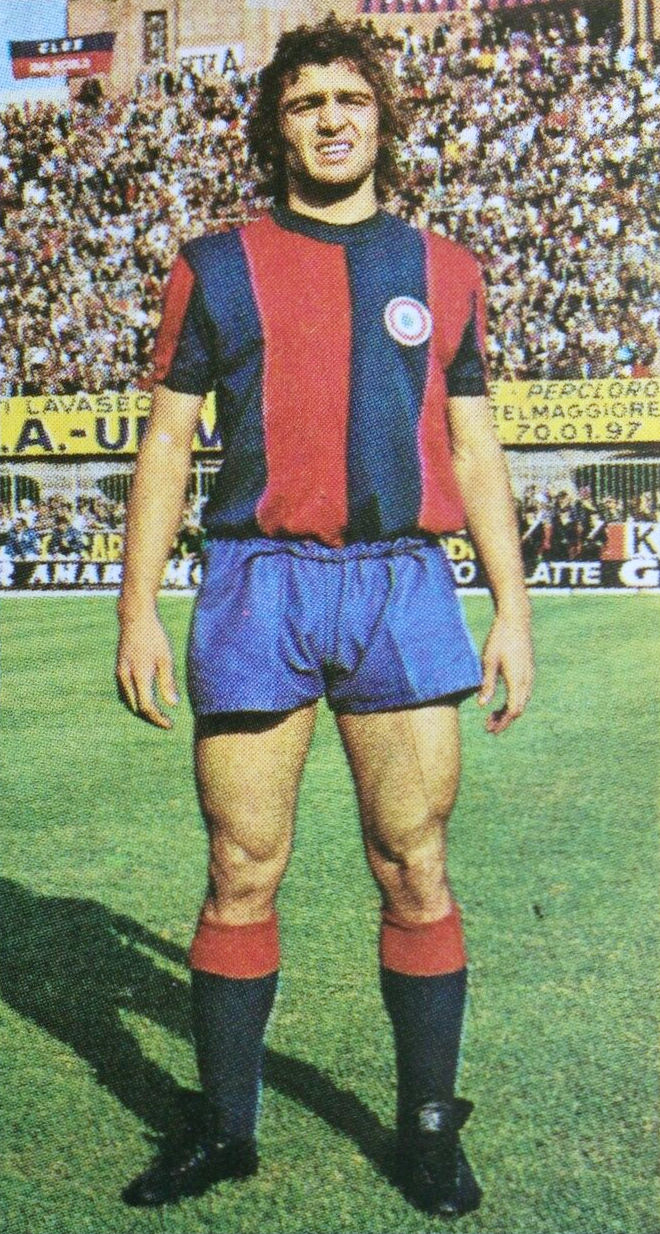
- Pecci with Bologna in 1974

Personal information
- Date of birth: 12 April 1955 (age 71)
- Place of birth: San Giovanni in Marignano, Italy
- Height: 1.72 m (5 ft 8 in)
- Position: Midfielder

Youth career
- Bologna

Senior career*
Years	Team	Apps	(Gls)
1973–1975	Bologna	34	(2)
1975–1981	Torino	154	(10)
1981–1985	Fiorentina	138	(13)
1985–1986	Napoli	24	(1)
1986–1989	Bologna	101	(3)
1989–1990	Vicenza	2	(0)
Total		453	(29)

International career
1977	Italy U21	2	(0)
1975–1978	Italy	6	(0)
- * Club domestic league appearances and goals

Eraldo Pecci (Italian pronunciation: [eˈraldo ˈpɛttʃi]; born 12 April 1955) is an Italian writer, pundit, and former footballer, who played as a midfielder.

== Club career ==
During his club career, Pecci played for Bologna, Fiorentina, S.S.C. Napoli and Torino, winning a Coppa Italia with Bologna, and a Serie A title with Torino.

== International career ==
Pecci represented the Italy national football team on 6 occasions between 1975 and 1978, and he was a member of the 1978 FIFA World Cup squad, during which Italy managed a fourth-place finish.

== Honours ==
=== Club ===
Bologna

- Coppa Italia: 1973–74

Torino

- Serie A: 1975–76

=== Individual ===
- Serie A Team of The Year: 1984
- Torino FC Hall of Fame: 2022
