= Luigi Danova =

Italian footballer

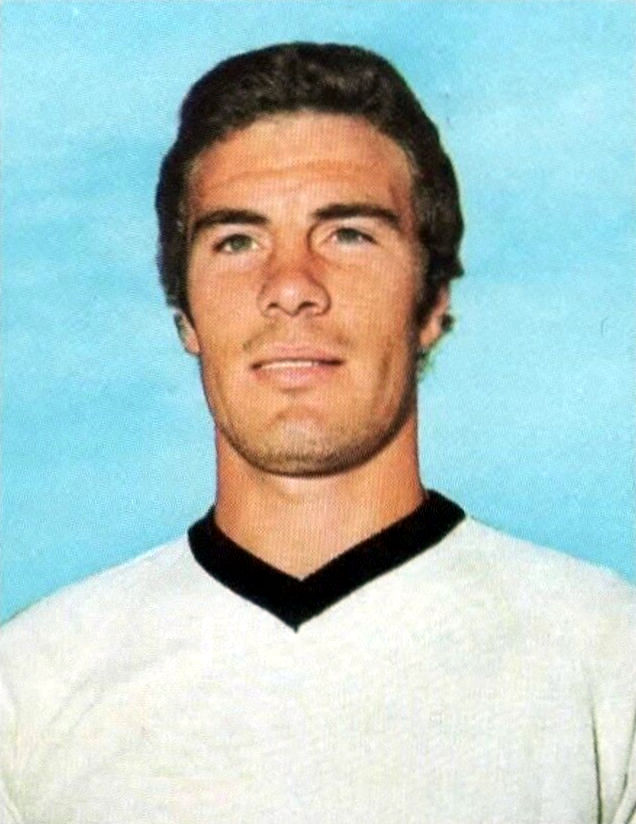
- Danova with Cesena in 1975

Personal information
- Full name: Luigi Danova
- Date of birth: 5 June 1952 (age 74)
- Place of birth: Sant'Angelo Lodigiano, Italy
- Position: Defender

Senior career*
Years	Team	Apps	(Gls)
1969–1970	Sant'Angelo	26	(0)
1970–1971	Juventus	0	(0)
1971–1973	Como	60	(0)
1973–1976	Cesena	88	(1)
1976–1985	Torino	246	(0)
1985–1987	Lecce	59	(1)
1987–1989	Mantova	65	(0)
1989–1991	Varese	65	(0)

International career
1976	Italy	1	(0)
- * Club domestic league appearances and goals

Luigi Danova (Italian pronunciation: [luˈiːdʒi daˈnɔːva]; born 5 June 1952) is an Italian footballer who played as a defender. On 22 December 1976, he represented the Italy national football team on the occasion of a friendly match against Portugal in a 2–1 away loss. He also made 246 appearances for Torino between 1976 and 1985.
