= Paolo Pulici =

Italian footballer

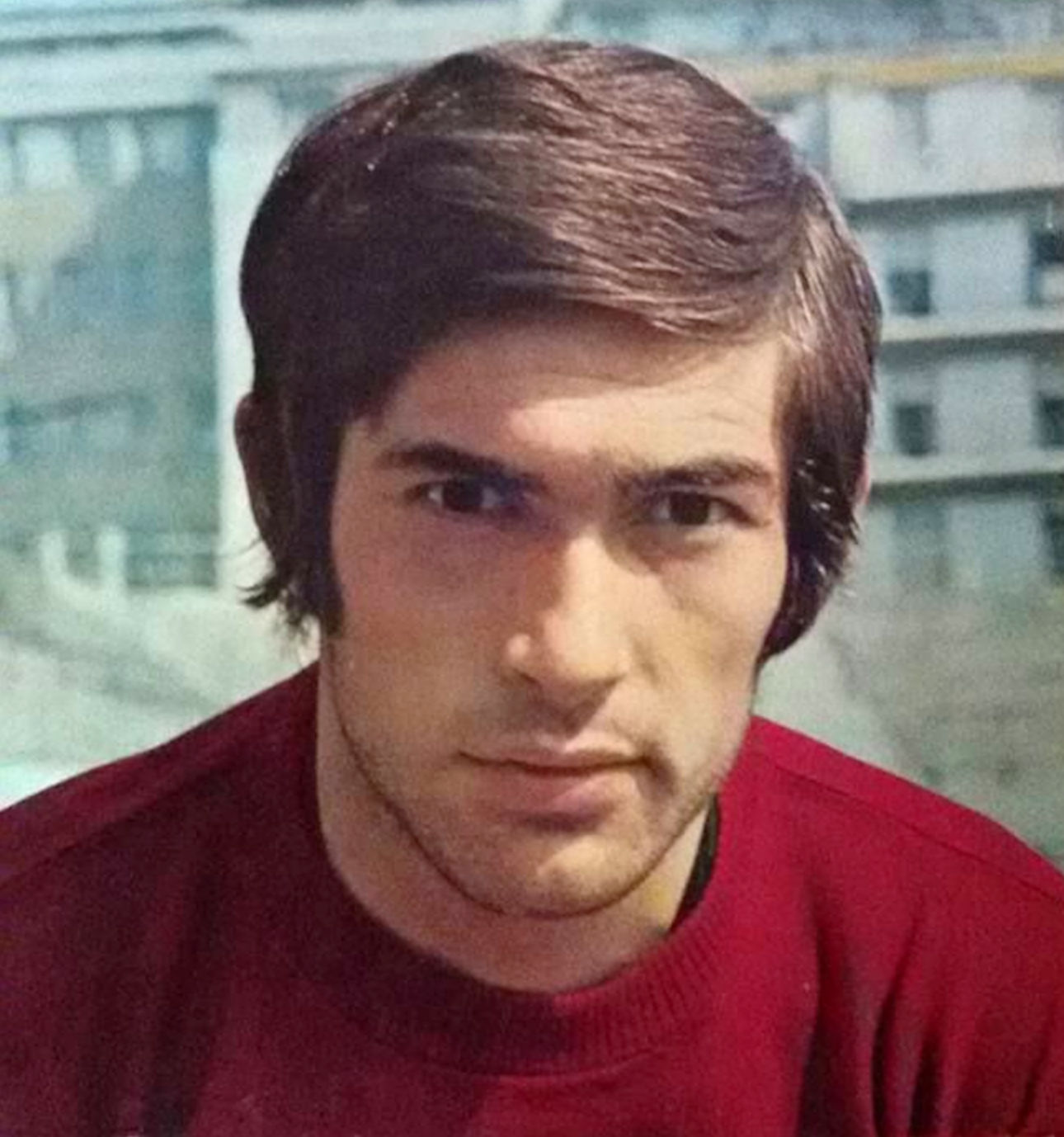
- Pulici with Torino in the 1971–72 season

Personal information
- Full name: Paolino Pulici
- Date of birth: 27 April 1950 (age 76)
- Place of birth: Roncello, Italy
- Height: 1.77 m (5 ft 10 in)
- Position: Striker

Team information
- Current team: Tritium (youth)

Youth career
- ?–1967: Legnano
- 1967–1968: Torino

Senior career*
Years	Team	Apps	(Gls)
1966–1967	Legnano	1	(0)
1967–1982	Torino	335	(134)
1982–1983	Udinese	26	(5)
1983–1985	Fiorentina	40	(3)
Total		412	(142)

International career
1969–1972	Italy U21	9	(5)
1973–1978	Italy	19	(5)

Managerial career
- 1986–1989: Piacenza (Assistant)
- 1990–: Tritium (Youth)
- * Club domestic league appearances and goals

Paolo Pulici (Italian pronunciation: [ˈpaːolo ˈpuːlitʃi]; born 27 April 1950) is an Italian football manager and former footballer who played as a striker. With 172 goals in all competitions, he is the all-time record goalscorer for Torino.

He had several nicknames: amongst the most famous were Pupi and the one created for him by the journalist Gianni Brera, Puliciclone (a pun on his family name, Pulici, and Ciclone, Italian for "cyclone"). Plus, he shared with his teammate Francesco Graziani the collective nickname I gemelli del gol (Italian for "The Twins of Goal"). At international level, he represented Italy at two FIFA World Cups, first in 1974, and subsequently in 1978, where he helped the team to a fourth-place finish. Since 1990 he has taught the game of football at Sportiva Tritium 1908 in Trezzo sull'Adda, at the football school that bears his name.

In 2014, he was inducted into the Torino FC Hall of Fame; he was the first player to ever be elected and was included in the "Forwards" category.

== Club career ==
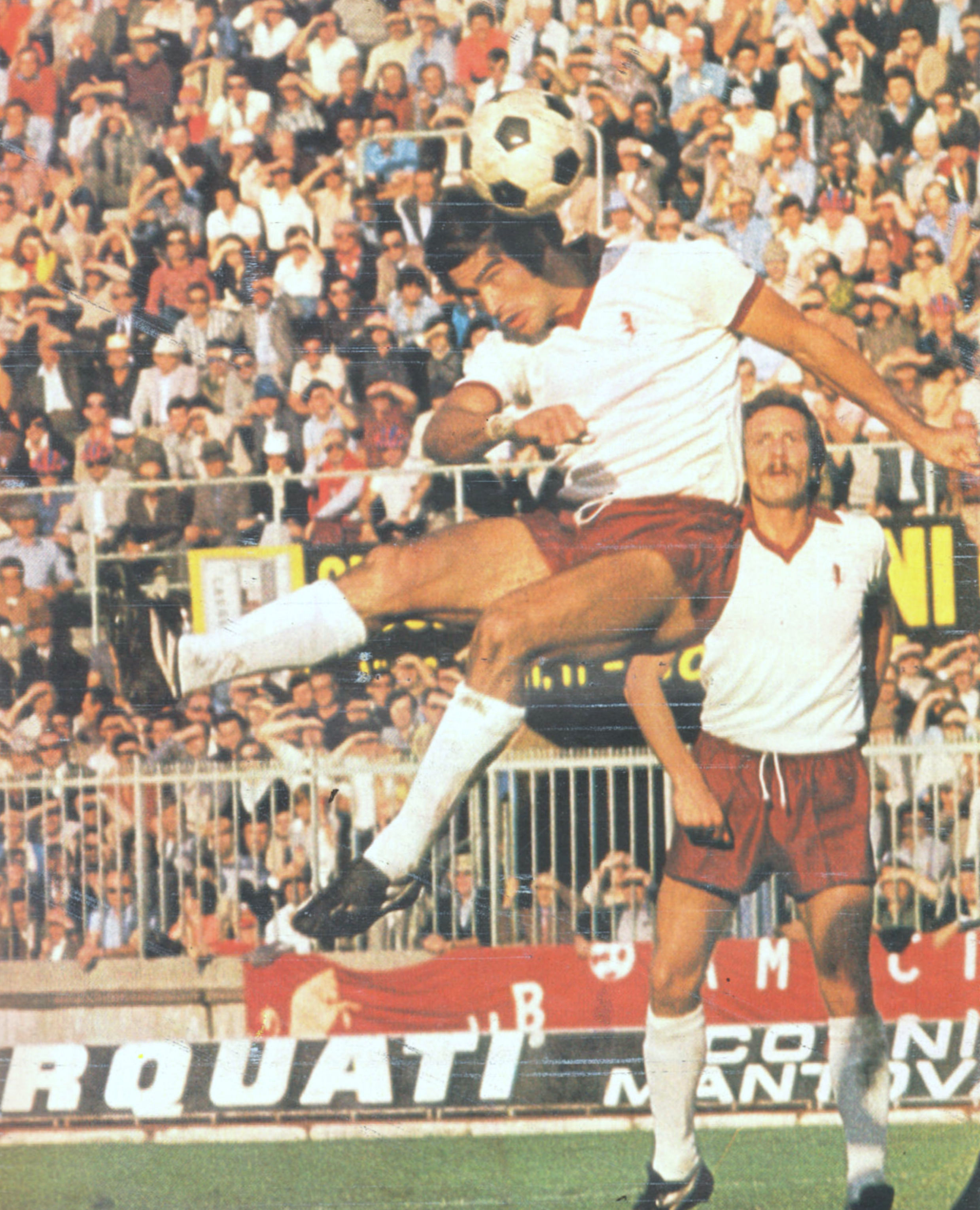
A Pulici header for Torino in 1975

Pulici was born on 27 April 1950 in Roncello, a small town at the time in the Province of Milan (now Province of Monza). Initially courted by Inter Milan, he was ultimately rejected as the club believed his left-foot only shooting could not match that of their striker Sandro Mazzola. In 1967, Torino acquired Pulici from Legnano. Under coach Edmondo Fabbri, he made his debut for Torino in the 1968–69 season as a starter in a 0-0 draw against Cagliari. In his first four seasons at Torino (three as starter), he played in 79 league games, but only scored nine goals due to technical shortcomings and his lack of composure in front of goal.

In 1972, the coach Gustavo Giagnoni excluded Pulici from the starting lineup for a period of two months, devoting him to technical refinement with the help of the coaches of the youth team. In 1972–73, he emerged as the top scorer in Serie A with 17 goals along with Gianni Rivera and Giuseppe Savoldi. He repeated this feat in 1974–75 (18 goals) and in 1975–76, when he scored 21 goals in the season won by Torino, played in tandem with strike-partner Francesco Graziani. The pair were nicknamed "i gemelli del gol" ("the goal twins"): Pulici's goal was decisive in the final round of the season against A.C. Cesena.

He played with Torino for 14 seasons, disputed 437 official games and scored 172 goals between league and cup competitions. In addition to the Scudetto won in 1975–76, he finished 2nd place in the league in 1976–77 and won a Coppa Italia trophy in 1970–71.

In subsequent years his number of goals diminished, with a minimum of three goals in the 1979–80 season, which coincided with the departure of Torino head coach Luigi Radice. In 1982, he was allowed to leave Torino for free, moving to Udinese; after a season in Friuli, he went to Fiorentina, with whom he ended his playing career.

== International career ==
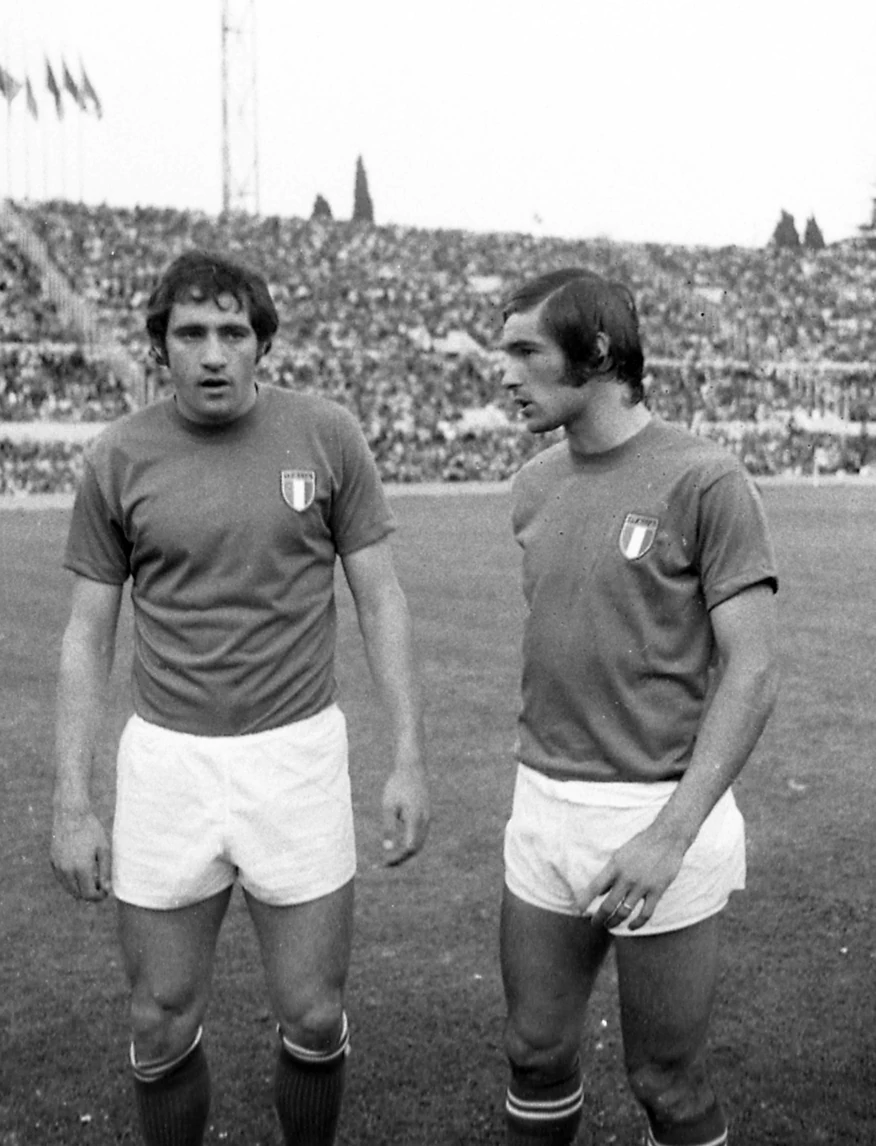
Pulici (right) and Giorgio Chinaglia with Italy in 1973

Pulici made his full international debut on 30 March 1973, in a 5–0 win over Luxembourg in a World Cup qualifier in Genoa. His first goals were a brace on 30 December 1975 in a 3–2 friendly win over Greece in Florence, his seventh cap. He then scored in his subsequent two matches, against Portugal and the United States.

In total, he played 19 matches and scored 5 goals for the Italy national team. He made the squad for two World Cups (1974 and 1978), but did not enter the field of play in either tournament. Internationally, Pulici played in 19 games and scored 5 goals; often deployed in tandem with Graziani. Failing to repeat the performance offered at Torino, he was often replaced by Roberto Bettega.

== Managerial career ==
After retiring, he joined the technical staff of Piacenza as assistant coach, after the Emilian club contacted him to resume athletic activities. From 1986 to 1988 he was at the side of coach Battista Rota, while in the season 1988–89 he reclaimed the role of assistant coach from Enrico Catuzzi and later Attilio Perotti.

== Style of play ==
Pulici was a tenacious and opportunistic right-footed forward, also adept at using his left foot. A fast, dynamic, and physically strong player, he was also known for his ability to score acrobatic goals. He was also skilled at penalty kicks.

== Honours ==
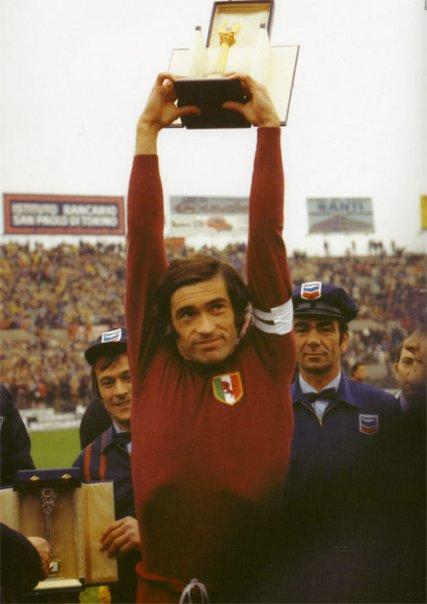
Torino captain Pulici awarded as 1975–76 Serie A top scorer

Torino

- Serie A: 1975–76
- Coppa Italia: 1970–71

Individual

- Capocannoniere: 1972–73 (17 goals), 1974–75 (18 goals), 1975–76 (21 goals)
- Torino FC Hall of Fame: 2014
