= Marino Lombardo =

Italian footballer (1950–2021)

Personal information
- Date of birth: 9 April 1950
- Date of death: 9 March 2021 (aged 70)

Senior career*
Years	Team	Apps	(Gls)
- Torino
- Cesena
- Pistoiese
- Pescara
- Triestina
- Arezzo
- Pro Gorizia

Managerial career
- Triestina
- * Club domestic league appearances and goals

Marino Lombardo (9 April 1950 – 9 March 2021) was an Italian professional football player and coach.

== Career ==
Lombardo, a full back, began his career with Torino, and later played for Cesena, Pistoiese, Pescara, Triestina, Arezzo and Pro Gorizia.

After retiring as a player in 1983 he worked as a coach, including for Triestina with whom he won promotion.

He died of a heart attack on 9 March 2021, aged 70.
