= Patrizio Sala =

Italian footballer (born 1955)

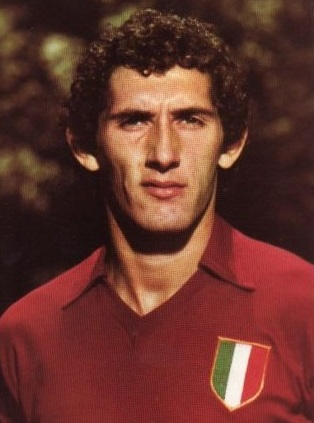

Personal information
- Full name: Patrizio Sala
- Date of birth: 16 June 1955 (age 71)
- Place of birth: Bellusco, Italy
- Height: 1.76 m (5 ft 9 in)
- Position: Midfielder

Youth career
- Monza

Senior career*
Years	Team	Apps	(Gls)
1973–1975	Monza	37	(4)
1975–1981	Torino	159	(4)
1981–1982	Sampdoria	34	(1)
1982–1984	Fiorentina	21	(0)
1983–1984	Pisa	23	(0)
1984–1988	Cesena	95	(4)
1987–1989	Parma	36	(0)
1989–1990	Solbiatese	14	(0)
Total		419	(13)

International career
1976–1980	Italy U21	3	(0)
1976–1980	Italy	8	(0)

Managerial career
- 1991–1995: Monza (youth)
- 1995–1996: Leffe
- 1997: Varese
- 1997–1998: Pistoiese
- 1999–2001: Biellese
- 2001–2002: Vis Pesaro
- 2002–2003: Valenzana
- 2003–2005: Pro Patria
- 2005: Torino (primavera)
- 2005–2006: Casale
- * Club domestic league appearances and goals

Patrizio Sala (Italian pronunciation: [paˈtrittsjo ˈsaːla]; born 16 June 1955) is an Italian former football manager and former football player who played as a midfielder.

== Club career ==
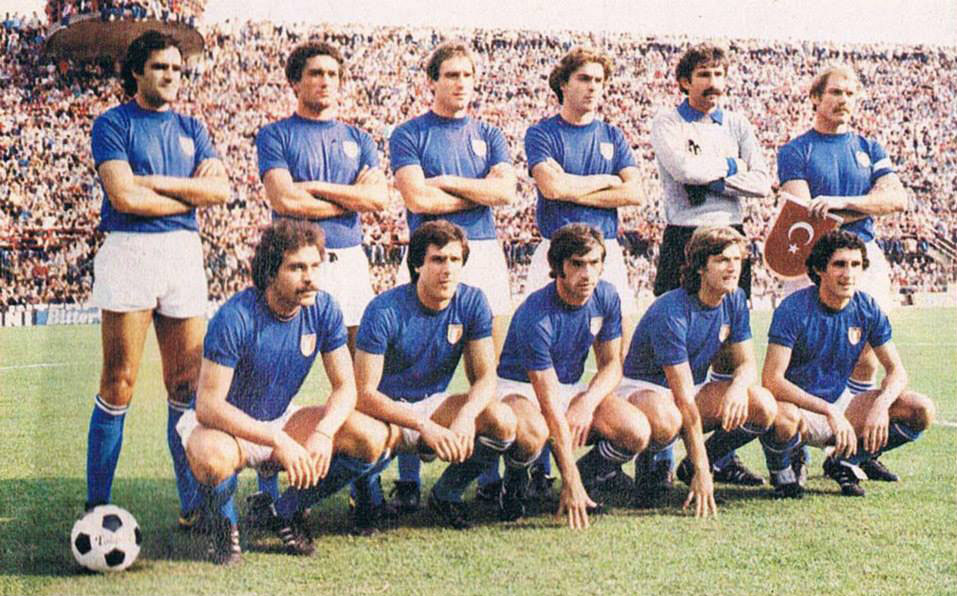
Sala (kneeling, first from right) with the Italian national team in 1978

Sala was born in Bellusco, Lombardy. During his club career he played for Serie A clubs, Torino (1975–81), Sampdoria (1981–82), Fiorentina (1982–84), Pisa (1983–84), Cesena (1984–88), and Parma (1987–89), starting and ending his career with lower division clubs Monza (1973–75), and Solbiatese (1989–90). He won the Serie A title with Torino in 1976.

== International career ==
Sala also played for the Italy national football team, making 8 appearances for his country between 1976 and 1980. He was a member of the 1978 FIFA World Cup squad under manager Enzo Bearzot, playing in one game at the tournament, as Italy finished in 4th place.

== Honours ==
Monza

- Coppa Italia Semiprofessionisti (2): 1973–74, 1974–75

Torino

- Serie A: 1975–76
