= Nello Santin =

Italian footballer and manager

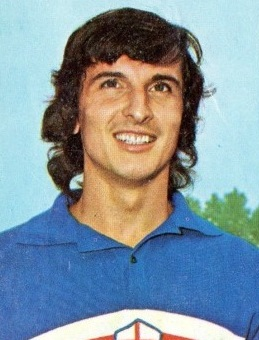
- Santin at Sampdoria in 1973

Personal information
- Full name: Nello Santin
- Date of birth: 3 July 1946 (age 80)
- Place of birth: Eraclea, Italy
- Height: 1.78 m (5 ft 10 in)
- Position: Centre back

Youth career
- Rondinella
- Milan

Senior career*
Years	Team	Apps	(Gls)
1963–1970	Milan	74	(0)
1970–1971	Lanerossi Vicenza	28	(1)
1971–1974	Sampdoria	87	(3)
1974–1979	Torino	85	(2)
1979–1980	Lanerossi Vicenza	6	(0)
Total		280	(6)

Managerial career
- 1984–1985: Civitavecchia
- 1985–1986: Pistoiese
- 1986–1988: Reggiana
- 1988–1989: Pavia
- 1989–1990: SPAL
- 1990–1991: Potenza
- 1992–1993: Fano
- 1999–2000: Volpianese
- 2003–2004: Pro Vercelli
- * Club domestic league appearances and goals

Nello Santin (born 3 July 1946) is an Italian former professional footballer, who played as a defender, and former football manager. He made 274 appearances in Serie A, most notably for Milan, Sampdoria and Torino, during the 1960s and 1970s.

== Honours ==
=== Club ===
- A.C. Milan
  - Serie A: 1967–68
  - Coppa Italia: 1966–67
  - European Cup: 1968–69
  - Cup Winners' Cup: 1967–68
  - Intercontinental Cup: 1969
- Torino
  - Serie A: 1975–76
