= Luigi Radice =

Italian football manager (1935–2018)

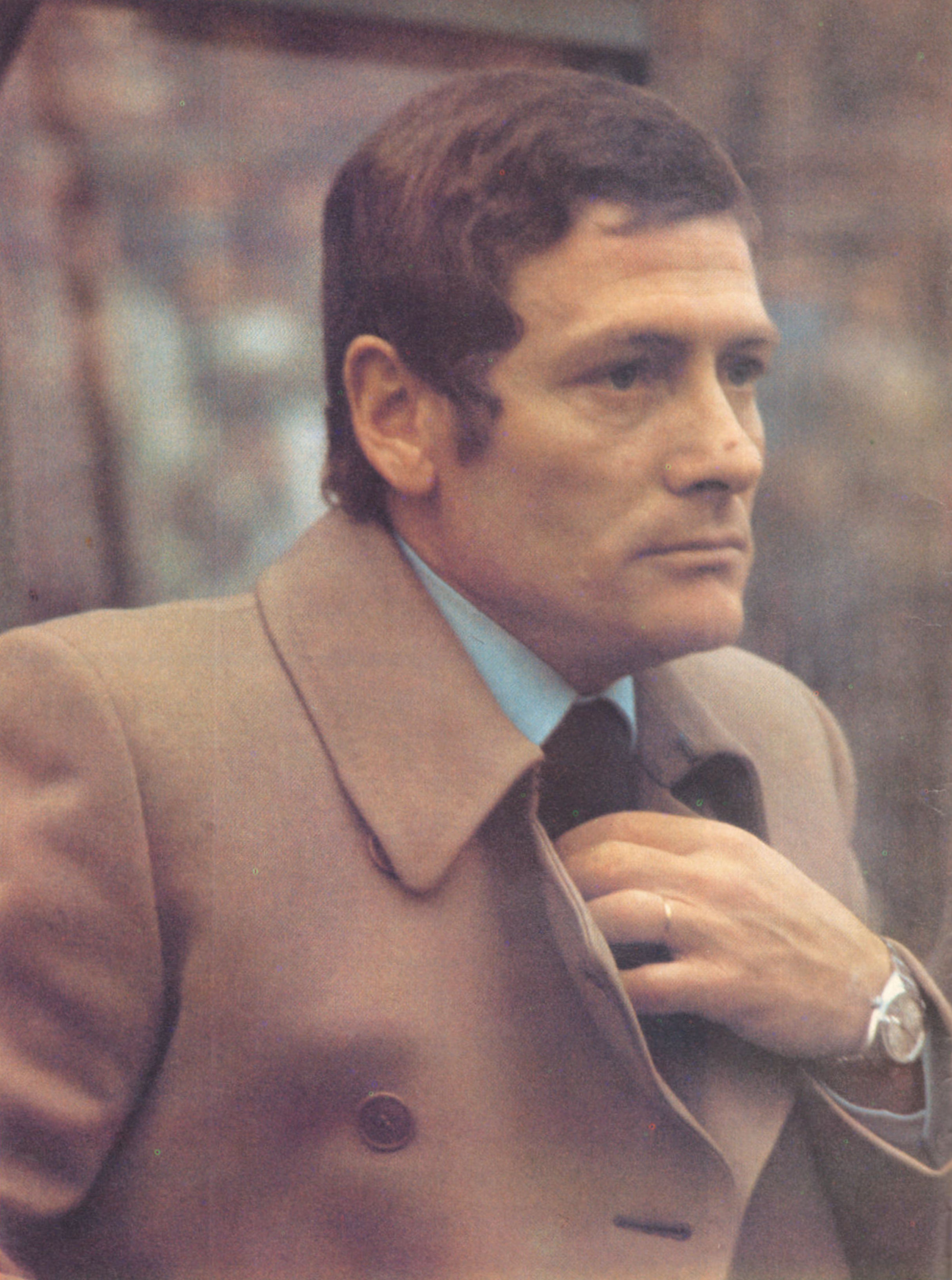
- Radice in 1974

Personal information
- Date of birth: 15 January 1935
- Place of birth: Cesano Maderno, Kingdom of Italy
- Date of death: 7 December 2018 (aged 83)
- Place of death: Turin, Italy
- Height: 1.73 m (5 ft 8 in)
- Position: Left-back

Youth career
- 1953–1954: AC Milan

Senior career*
Years	Team	Apps	(Gls)
1955–1959	AC Milan	20	(0)
1959–1960	Triestina	31	(0)
1960	AC Milan	2	(0)
1960–1961	Padova	24	(0)
1961–1965	AC Milan	53	(1)
Total		128	(1)

International career
1962	Italy	5	(0)

Managerial career
- 1966–1968: Monza
- 1968–1969: Treviso
- 1969–1971: Monza
- 1971–1973: Cesena
- 1973–1974: Fiorentina
- 1975: Cagliari
- 1975–1980: Torino
- 1980–1981: Bologna
- 1981–1982: AC Milan
- 1982–1983: Bari
- 1983–1984: Inter Milan
- 1984–1989: Torino
- 1989–1990: Roma
- 1990–1991: Bologna
- 1991–1993: Fiorentina
- 1993: Cagliari
- 1995–1996: Genoa
- 1996–1998: Monza
- * Club domestic league appearances and goals

Luigi "Gigi" Radice (Italian pronunciation: [luˈiːdʒi ˈdʒiːdʒi raˈdiːtʃe]; 15 January 1935 – 7 December 2018) was an Italian football manager and player. A strong, tenacious, and consistent defender, he was usually deployed as a left-back. As a manager, he was known for his use of zona mista tactics, and his early attempts to implement pressing and zonal marking tactics into his teams.

== Club career ==
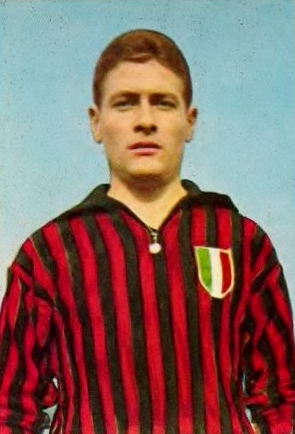
Radice with AC Milan in 1962

Radice played in Serie A for teams such as AC Milan, Triestina and Padova. Initially a member of the Milan Youth squad, he struggled to find space in the first team; he made his Serie A debut with Milan on 25 March 1956, in a 0–0 away draw against SPAL. He made only 19 appearances in total during his first three seasons at the club, as Milan won the 1956–57 and the 1958–59 Serie A titles. He subsequently moved to Triestina and Padova to gain more playing time, where he impressed fans before being recalled to Milan. During his second stint with the club, he played a pivotal role in helping Milan to win the 1961–62 Serie A title and the 1962–63 European Cup. However, serious injuries to his knee cut his playing career short, and he retired in 1965. In total, he made 95 appearances for Milan, 75 of which came in Serie A, scoring 1 goal throughout his Milan career, which came in Serie A.

== International career ==
Radice was also a member of the Italian squad for the World Cup in 1962, making two appearances at the tournament as Italy was eliminated in the first round; he made five appearances for Italy in total between 1961 and 1963.

== Managerial career ==
Radice began his managerial career with Monza, winning the 1966–67 Serie C Girone A; he remained at the club from 1966 until 1971, apart from a year-long spell with Treviso between 1968 and 1969. After his experience with Treviso he moved to Cesena, with whom he achieved the club's first promotion to Serie A in 1972–73. He made his managerial debut in Serie A the following season with Fiorentina. After a brief time at Cagliari in 1975, Radice moved to Torino, where he became the first and only coach to lead the club to the Scudetto since the Superga tragedy, winning the title during the 1975–76 season. Radice was awarded the Seminatore d'Oro that season as the best coach in Serie A.

On 17 April 1979, Radice was involved in a car accident on the Autostrada dei Fiori in which former football player Paolo Barison lost his life. Radice was severely injured and hospitalised at Imperia, a 56-year-old man was also killed in the crash. During the 1979–80 season, in February 1980, he left Turin. In 1980–81, Radice led Bologna to a 7th-place finish despite starting the season with a 5-point penalty following the Totonero scandal. He coached Milan in the 1981–82 season, but was replaced by Italo Galbiati halfway through the season which ended with the relegation of the Rossoneri. In 1983, he replaced Enrico Catuzzi as the manager of Bari in Serie B, coaching the Galletti for the remaining 13 games of the season. He managed Inter Milan in the 1983–84 season, then returned to Torino in 1984–85; notably achieving a second-place finish in his first season back.

In 1989, Radice left Torino, subsequently managing Roma and Bologna. In the 1992–93 season Fiorentina was entrusted to Radice. The team started well, and at the turn of the year was sitting in second place, having scored 15 points in the first 13 matches. However, a mid-season feud with the club's chairman Vittorio Cecchi Gori led to the departure of Radice, and Fiorentina nose-dived in the standings. They scored only 15 more points in the remaining 21 matches, and finished only 16th. The result was relegation to Serie B. Radice later returned to Cagliari in 1993–94, and in 1995 he managed Genoa. He ended his managerial coach where he had started, in Monza, with whom he obtained promotion to Serie B in the 1996–97 season.

== Personal life ==
Radice was known for his left-wing politics. In a 1982 interview, he said: "I am not ashamed to maintain that my political views lie on the left, somewhere between socialist and communist: so what? It is precisely for this reason that I have developed a vision of football and society which goes far beyond just training and the dugout." On 26 April 2015, his son revealed that Radice was suffering from Alzheimer's disease. Radice died on 7 December 2018.

== Honours ==
=== Player ===
AC Milan

- Serie A: 1956–57, 1958–59, 1961–62
- European Cup: 1962–63

=== Manager ===
Torino

- Serie A: 1975–76

Monza

- Serie C (Girone A): 1966–67

=== Individual ===
- Seminatore d'oro: 1975–76
- AC Milan Hall of Fame
- Torino FC Hall of Fame: 2014
- Italian Football Hall of Fame: 2019
