= 1976–77 Serie A =

74th season of top-tier Italian football

Serie A
- Season: 1976–77
- Dates: 3 October 1976 – 22 May 1977
- Champions: Juventus; 17th title
- Relegated: Sampdoria; Catanzaro; Cesena
- European Cup: Juventus
- Cup Winners' Cup: Milan
- UEFA Cup: Torino; Fiorentina; Internazionale; Lazio
- Matches: 240
- Goals: 532 (2.22 per match)
- Top goalscorer: Francesco Graziani (21 goals)

Serie A 1976-77 team distribution

The 1976–77 Serie A season was won by Juventus.

== Teams ==
Genoa, Catanzaro and Foggia had been promoted from Serie B.

== Final classification ==
Pos	Team	Pld	W	D	L	GF	GA	GD	Pts	Qualification or relegation
1	Juventus (C)	30	23	5	2	50	20	+30	51	Qualification to European Cup
2	Torino	30	21	8	1	51	14	+37	50	Qualification to UEFA Cup
3	Fiorentina	30	12	11	7	38	31	+7	35	Qualification to UEFA Cup
4	Internazionale	30	10	13	7	34	27	+7	33	Qualification to UEFA Cup
5	Lazio	30	10	11	9	34	28	+6	31	Qualification to UEFA Cup
6	Perugia	30	9	11	10	32	28	+4	29	
7	Napoli (Note: 1 point deducted.)	30	9	11	10	37	38	−1	28	
8	Roma	30	9	10	11	27	33	−6	28	
9	Hellas Verona	30	7	14	9	26	32	−6	28	
10	Milan	30	5	17	8	30	33	−3	27	Qualification to Cup Winners' Cup
11	Genoa	30	8	11	11	40	45	−5	27	
12	Bologna	30	8	11	11	24	31	−7	27	
13	Foggia	30	10	6	14	33	39	−6	26	
14	Sampdoria (R)	30	6	12	12	28	42	−14	24	Relegation to Serie B
15	Catanzaro (R)	30	7	7	16	26	43	−17	21	Relegation to Serie B
16	Cesena (R)	30	3	8	19	22	48	−26	14	Relegation to Serie B

Source: Panini
(C) Champions; (R) Relegated

== Results ==
Home \ Away	BOL	CTZ	CES	FIO	FOG	GEN	INT	JUV	LAZ	MIL	NAP	PER	ROM	SAM	TOR	HEL
Bologna		0–0	0–0	2–0	0–0	0–0	1–5	0–1	1–0	2–2	0–1	1–0	2–0	4–1	0–3	0–0
Catanzaro	1–2		4–2	0–1	3–1	2–1	1–3	0–2	1–2	1–0	0–0	1–1	1–1	1–0	0–4	2–1
Cesena	0–0	1–0		1–2	2–3	1–1	0–0	0–1	0–0	0–2	0–2	0–3	4–0	1–1	0–3	0–1
Fiorentina	3–0	1–1	2–1		4–1	1–2	3–0	1–3	0–1	1–1	2–1	1–0	1–1	1–1	0–1	2–1
Foggia	1–0	1–0	0–2	2–3		2–3	0–0	0–1	1–0	2–1	2–2	2–1	1–0	2–0	0–1	4–1
Genoa	0–2	2–0	4–1	1–1	1–2		2–2	2–2	3–1	1–0	2–3	0–0	2–2	1–1	1–1	1–0
Internazionale	0–0	2–1	1–1	1–1	1–1	1–0		0–2	1–1	0–0	3–2	1–1	3–0	0–0	0–1	0–0
Juventus	2–1	3–0	3–2	0–0	1–0	1–0	2–0		2–0	2–1	2–1	1–0	1–0	3–0	0–2	2–1
Lazio	3–0	0–1	3–0	4–1	0–0	4–1	2–1	2–3		1–2	0–0	1–0	1–0	1–0	0–0	1–1
Milan	1–1	3–2	0–0	0–0	0–0	2–2	1–1	2–3	2–2		1–1	2–1	1–1	3–0	0–0	0–0
Napoli	1–2	1–0	3–1	0–2	3–2	1–1	0–3	0–2	1–1	3–1		1–1	1–0	1–1	0–0	3–0
Perugia	1–0	1–1	1–0	0–0	1–0	2–1	0–1	1–1	2–0	3–1	4–2		3–0	0–0	1–1	1–1
Roma	1–0	1–0	2–0	0–0	3–1	1–0	2–3	3–1	1–0	1–1	0–0	2–2		3–0	1–0	0–0
Sampdoria	0–0	3–1	2–1	2–2	2–1	1–2	0–1	0–2	0–0	0–0	2–2	2–0	1–0		2–3	3–1
Torino	1–0	3–1	2–0	2–0	1–0	5–1	1–0	1–1	3–3	2–0	2–1	2–1	2–0	3–1		1–0
Hellas Verona	3–3	0–0	2–1	1–2	2–1	3–2	1–0	0–0	0–0	0–0	1–0	2–0	1–1	2–2	0–0	

Source: Almanacco Illustrato del Calcio - La Storia 1898-2004, Panini Edizioni, Modena, September 2005 (in Italian)
Legend: Blue = home team win; Yellow = draw; Red = away team win.

== Top goalscorers ==
Rank	Player	Club	Goals
1	(Italy) Francesco Graziani	Torino	21
2	(Italy) Roberto Pruzzo	Genoa	18
3	(Italy) Roberto Bettega	Juventus	17
4	(Italy) Paolo Pulici	Torino	16
4	(Italy) Giuseppe Savoldi	Napoli	16
6	(Italy) Oscar Damiani	Genoa	11
7	(Italy) Roberto Boninsegna	Juventus	10
7	(Italy) Bruno Giordano	Lazio	10
9	(Italy) Franco Vannini	Perugia	9
9	(Italy) Carlo Muraro	Internazionale	9
9	(Italy) Claudio Desolati	Fiorentina	9
12	(Italy) Agostino Di Bartolomei	Roma	8

== Attendances ==
No.	Club	Average
1	Napoli	71,182
2	Internazionale	43,339
3	Juventus	41,892
4	Milan	40,995
5	Torino	40,513
6	Lazio	37,920
7	Roma	36,899
8	Genoa	34,327
9	Fiorentina	31,704
10	Bologna	27,612
11	Hellas Verona	25,198
12	Sampdoria	23,300
13	Perugia	17,586
14	Foggia	16,984
15	Cesena	13,888
16	Catanzaro	13,709

== References and sources ==
- Almanacco Illustrato del Calcio - La Storia 1898-2004, Panini Edizioni, Modena, September 2005
