= Sauro Catellani =

Italian footballer

Personal information
- Date of birth: 14 March 1953 (age 73)
- Place of birth: Pegognaga, Italy
- Height: 1.84 m (6 ft 1/2 in)
- Position: Defender

Senior career*
Years	Team	Apps	(Gls)
1971–1975	Internazionale	16	(0)
1975–1976	Verona	26	(1)
1976–1979	Napoli	44	(0)
1979–1980	Udinese	22	(1)
1980–1981	L.R. Vicenza	21	(0)
1981–1982	Parma	19	(0)
1982–1984	Mantova	56	(4)
1984–1987	Modena	75	(3)
- * Club domestic league appearances and goals

Sauro Catellani (born 14 March 1953 in Pegognaga) is an Italian former professional footballer who played as a defender.

== Honours ==
Napoli

- Anglo-Italian League Cup winner: 1976
