= Giovanni Roccotelli =

Italian footballer

Personal information
- Date of birth: 14 May 1952 (age 74)
- Place of birth: Bari, Italy
- Position: Winger

Senior career*
Years	Team	Apps	(Gls)
1971–1973	Barletta		
1973–1974	Avellino		
1974–1976	Torino		
1976–1977	Cagliari	28	(2)
1977–1979	Ascoli	46	(5)
1979–1980	Taranto		
1980–1981	Cesena		
1981–1982	Pescara		
1982–1984	Foggia		
1984–1986	Nocerina		
1986–1987	Casertana		
1987–1988	Torres		
1988–1990	Selargius		
- * Club domestic league appearances and goals

Giovanni Roccotelli (born 14 May 1952) is an Italian former professional footballer who played as a winger.

== Early and personal life ==
Born in Bari, Roccotelli was nicknamed "Cocò".

== Club career ==
Roccotelli played for Barletta, Avellino, Torino, Cagliari, Ascoli, Taranto, Cesena, Pescara, Foggia, Nocerina, Casertana, Torres and Selargius. After making his debut with Barletta and spending a season in Serie B with Avellino, he made his debut in Serie A with Torino in 1975, at the age of 22. In 1977, he moved to Ascoli for two seasons, scoring 5 goals in 46 appearances, and helping the club to win promotion during the 1977–78 season; after playing for Taranto, he also won promotion to Serie A with Cesena during the 1980–81 season. In total he made 19 in appearances in Serie A with Torino, Ascoli, and Cesena, and 202 appearances in Serie B with Avellino, Cagliari, Ascoli, Taranto, Cesena, and Foggia, scoring 19 goals.

== International career ==
Roccotelli was called up to the Italy national football team by Enzo Bearzot but was ultimately not capped at that level.

== Style of play and association with the rabona ==
Although he was usually deployed as a winger on the right flank, often wearing the number 7 shirt, Roccotelli was also deployed as a left-back or as a forward on occasion. A talented, creative and skilful right-footed player, he was a powerful striker and passer of the ball, who possessed good technique. Known for his flair, dribbling ability, and his use of feints and tricks on the ball, Roccotelli is credited with popularising the rabona in Italy during the 1970s; at that time, the move was simply called a "crossed-kick", as he placed his right foot behind his left in order to strike the ball. He often used the move on crosses, penalties, long balls, free-kicks, and shots on goal from outside the area.
