= Claudio Sala =

Italian footballer (born 1947)

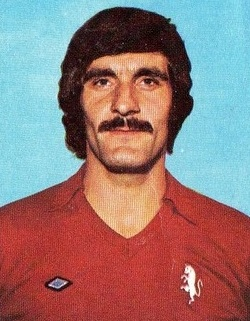

Personal information
- Date of birth: 8 September 1947 (age 79)
- Place of birth: Macherio, Italy
- Height: 1.78 m (5 ft 10 in)
- Position: Winger

Youth career
- Monza

Senior career*
Years	Team	Apps	(Gls)
1965–1968	Monza	75	(24)
1968–1969	Napoli	23	(2)
1969–1980	Torino	365	(22)
1980–1982	Genoa	41	(0)
Total		504	(48)

International career
1971–1978	Italy	18	(0)

Managerial career
- 1989: Torino
- 1990: Catanzaro
- 1991: Catanzaro
- 2001: Moncalieri
- * Club domestic league appearances and goals

Claudio Sala (Italian pronunciation: [ˈklaudjo ˈsaːla]; born 8 September 1947) is an Italian former footballer, manager and current commentator, who played as a winger.

== Club career ==
Sala made his debut for Monza, later moving to Napoli, Torino and Genoa. In total, he played 323 matches and scored 27 goals in the Serie A. With Torino, he won the 1975–76 Serie A, and the 1970–71 Coppa Italia.

== International career ==
Sala also earned 18 caps for the Italy national team, including playing in the 1978 FIFA World Cup, where Italy finished in fourth place after reaching the semi-final.

== Style of play ==
Nicknamed "il poeta del gol" ("the goal poet," in Italian), Sala was usually deployed as a winger, but could also play as an attacking midfielder, or even as a main or supporting striker on occasion. Regarded as one of Italy's greatest wingers, he was a quick, powerful, and highly creative player, and an excellent assist provider. He had good technical ability, as well as accurate passing and crossing ability, which allowed him to be an effective playmaker. As a two-footed player, he was capable of attacking on either wing, and was known for his ability to get past his opponents and deliver balls into the penalty area from the touchline.

== Honours ==
Torino

- Serie A: 1975–76
- Coppa Italia: 1970–71

Monza

- Serie C: 1966–67

Individual

- Guerin d'Oro: 1976, 1977
- Torino FC Hall of Fame: 2016
