= Guerin Sportivo =

Italian sports magazine

- Cover of the 8th issue of 2025
- Categories: Sport
- Frequency: Monthly
- Format: Magazine (former newspaper)
- Publisher: Conti Editore
- Founded: 1912; 114 years ago
- Company: Conti Editore
- Country: Italy
- Language: Italian
- Website: guerinsportivo.it
- ISSN: 1122-1712

The Guerin Sportivo is an Italian sports magazine. It is the oldest sport magazine in the world.

Journalists who worked for the magazine include Gianni Brera, Indro Montanelli, Giorgio Tosatti, Darwin Pastorin, Carlo Nesti, Mario Sconcerti, Stefano Disegni and Rino Tommasi.

== History and profile ==
Founded in 1912 in Turin, it is published every month.

The title and the logo, depicting a medieval knight throwing a javelin, are inspired by the lead character in Andrea di Barberino's chivalric romance Il Guerrin Meschino ("The Wretched Guerrin"), written in 1410.

Originally, it was printed on green paper, whence the popular nickname verdolino, and also housed satirical panels. Characters used in his panels by artist Carlin (a zebra for Juventus, a female wolf for Roma, a devil for Milan and others) inspired most of the symbols of Italian sides used today.

In the mid-1970s, Guerin Sportivo moved from newspaper to magazine format, starting to include a greater number of photos. Since its origins, most of the content was devoted to football, other sports being given less detail. Since the 1990s, virtually all pages are dedicated to football.

Guerin Sportivo is published by Conti Editore. The publisher itself is owned by the Corriere dello Sport – Stadio and Tuttosport groups. The two daily sports newspapers are owned by Roberto Amodei.

== Circulation ==
In 2007, Guerin Sportivo had a circulation of 45,067 copies.

== Awards ==
Over the years, Guerin Sportivo has presented several annual awards.

=== Guerin d'Oro ===
From 1976 to 2015, the Guerin d'Oro was awarded to the best Serie A football player.

=== Bravo Award ===
From 1975 to 2015, the Bravo Award was awarded to the most outstanding young European footballer.

=== Player of the Year (1979–1986) ===
The winner was chosen by reporters, readers and writers of the magazine from many countries. It was first awarded in 1979 and was discontinued in 1986. In 1987, Guerin Sportivo held a vote between Diego Maradona and Ruud Gullit to decide the best player of the year. Diego Maradona won by a small margin.

Year	Rank	Player	Team	Points
1979	1st	(Argentina) Diego Maradona	(Argentina) Argentinos Juniors	–
1980	1st	(West Germany) Karl-Heinz Rummenigge	(West Germany) Bayern Munich	23
1980	2nd	(West Germany) Manfred Kaltz	(West Germany) Hamburger SV	20
1980	3rd	(Argentina) Diego Maradona	(Argentina) Argentinos Juniors	17
1981	1st	(Brazil) Zico	(Brazil) Flamengo	26
1981	2nd	(Argentina) Diego Maradona	(Argentina) Boca Juniors	26
1981	3rd	(West Germany) Karl-Heinz Rummenigge	(West Germany) Bayern Munich	26
1982	1st	(Italy) Paolo Rossi	(Italy) Juventus	31
1982	2nd	(Italy) Gaetano Scirea	(Italy) Juventus	29
1982	3rd	(West Germany) Karlheinz Förster	(West Germany) VfB Stuttgart	25
1982	3rd	(Brazil) Falcão	(Italy) Roma	25
1983	1st	(Brazil) Falcão	(Italy) Roma	23
1983	2nd	(Brazil) Zico	(Italy) Udinese	16
1983	3rd	(France) Michel Platini	(Italy) Juventus	12
1984	1st	(France) Michel Platini	(Italy) Juventus	63
1984	2nd	(Wales) Ian Rush	(England) Liverpool	3
1984	3rd	(Argentina) Diego Maradona	(Italy) Napoli	2
1985	1st	(France) Michel Platini	(Italy) Juventus	77
1985	2nd	(Argentina) Diego Maradona	(Italy) Napoli	20
1985	3rd	(Uruguay) Enzo Francescoli	(Argentina) River Plate	4
1986	1st	(Argentina) Diego Maradona	(Italy) Napoli	90
1986	2nd	(Italy) Alessandro Altobelli	(Italy) Inter Milan	2
1986	3rd	(England) Gary Lineker	(Spain) Barcelona	1
1986	3rd	(Argentina) Jorge Burruchaga	(France) Nantes	1
1986	3rd	(Spain) Emilio Butragueño	(Spain) Real Madrid	1
1986	3rd	(Wales) Ian Rush	(England) Liverpool	1
1987	1st	(Argentina) Diego Maradona	(Italy) Napoli	5 610
1987	2nd	(Netherlands) Ruud Gullit	(Italy) AC Milan	5 577

=== Manager of the Year ===
Guerin Sportivo also chose a Manager of the Year in 1983, 1984 and 1986.

Year	Rank	Manager	Team	Points
1983	1st	(Germany) Sepp Piontek	Denmark	19
1983	2nd	(Austria) Ernst Happel	(Germany) Hamburger SV	13
1983	2nd	(Sweden) Nils Liedholm	(Italy) Roma	13
1984	1st	(France) Michel Hidalgo	France	38
1984	2nd	(Sweden) Nils Liedholm	(Italy) AC Milan	11
1984	3rd	(Argentina) Carlos Bilardo	Argentina	6
1986	1st	(Argentina) Carlos Bilardo	Argentina	44
1986	2nd	(Ukraine) Valeriy Lobanovskyi	(Soviet Union) Dynamo Kyiv	17
1986	3rd	(Italy) Giovanni Trapattoni	(Italy) Inter Milan	13

=== Team of the Year ===
Guerin Sportivo also chose a National Team of the Year and a Club Team of the Year in 1983, 1984 and 1986.

National Team of the Year				Club Team of the Year		
Year	Rank	Team	Points	Rank	Team	Points
1983	1st	Denmark	42	1st	(Scotland) Aberdeen	19
1983	2nd	Sweden	5	2nd	(Germany) Hamburger SV	15
1983	2nd	West Germany	5	3rd	(Italy) Roma	11
1984	1st	France	67	1st	(England) Liverpool	39
1984	2nd	Argentina	1	2nd	(Argentina) Independiente	18
1984	2nd	Denmark	1	3rd	(Italy) Juventus	10
1984	2nd	Portugal	1	—		
1986	1st	Argentina	55	1st	(Soviet Union) Dynamo Kyiv	39
1986	2nd	(Soviet Union) Soviet Union	25	2nd	(Spain) Real Madrid	34
1986	3rd	Denmark	10	3rd	(Argentina) River Plate	16

=== All-Star Team ===
The Player of the Year was chosen from 1980 to 1983 based on appearances in All-Star team votes. In 1984 and 1986, a separate vote for an All-Star team was conducted.

Year	Goalkeeper	Defenders	Midfielders	Forwards
1980	(Spain) Luis Arconada	(West Germany) Manfred Kaltz (Austria) Bruno Pezzey (Netherlands) Ruud Krol (Italy) Claudio Gentile	(West Germany) Bernd Schuster (Argentina) Diego Maradona (Italy) Giancarlo Antognoni	(West Germany) Karl-Heinz Rummenigge (West Germany) Horst Hrubesch (Brazil) Zico
1981	(Spain) Luis Arconada	(West Germany) Manfred Kaltz (Netherlands) Ruud Krol (Austria) Bruno Pezzey (Brazil) Júnior	(West Germany) Bernd Schuster (West Germany) Paul Breitner (Brazil) Zico	(West Germany) Karl-Heinz Rummenigge (Argentina) Diego Maradona (Soviet Union) Oleg Blokhin
1982	(Soviet Union) Rinat Dasayev	(Italy) Claudio Gentile (Belgium) Eric Gerets (West Germany) Karlheinz Förster (Italy) Gaetano Scirea	(Brazil) Falcão (Italy) Marco Tardelli (Argentina) Diego Maradona	(Italy) Bruno Conti (Italy) Paolo Rossi (West Germany) Karl-Heinz Rummenigge
1983	(Soviet Union) Rinat Dasayev	(Belgium) Eric Gerets (West Germany) Karlheinz Förster (Sweden) Glenn Hysén (Italy) Antonio Cabrini	(Brazil) Falcão (England) Bryan Robson (France) Michel Platini (Argentina) Diego Maradona	(Brazil) Zico (West Germany) Karl-Heinz Rummenigge
1984	(West Germany) Toni Schumacher	(West Germany) Hans-Peter Briegel (West Germany) Karlheinz Förster (France) Maxime Bossis (Italy) Antonio Cabrini	(France) Jean Tigana (Scotland) Graeme Souness (France) Michel Platini (England) Bryan Robson	(Wales) Ian Rush (West Germany) Karl-Heinz Rummenigge
1986	(Soviet Union) Rinat Dasayev	(Brazil) Josimar (Brazil) Júlio César (Denmark) Morten Olsen (France) Manuel Amoros	(Argentina) Jorge Burruchaga (West Germany) Lothar Matthäus (Argentina) Diego Maradona (France) Luis Fernandez	(Soviet Union) Igor Belanov (Spain) Emilio Butragueño

=== The 50 Greats of the Century ===
At the end of 1999, the magazine finalised a list of the 50 greatest players of the 20th century, called I grandi del secolo, written by Adalberto Bortolotti.

The 50 Greats of the Century (top 20 players)
Rank	Player	Nationality
1	Pelé	Brazil
2	Diego Maradona	Argentina
3	Alfredo Di Stefano	Argentina
4	Johan Cruijff	Netherlands
5	Giuseppe Meazza	Italy
6	Ferenc Puskas	Hungary
7	Valentino Mazzola	Italy
8	Juan Alberto Schiaffino	Uruguay
9	Michel Platini	France
10	Franz Beckenbauer	Germany
11	Marco Van Basten	Netherlands
12	Eusebio	Portugal
13	Garrincha	Brazil
14	Gianni Rivera	Italy
15	Zico	Brazil
16	Omar Sivori	Argentina
17	Ricardo Zamora	Spain
18	Silvio Piola	Italy
19	Ronaldo	Brazil
20	Dino Zoff	Italy

== See also ==
- Guerin d'Oro
- Bravo Award
- L'albo d'Oro
