= 1975–76 Serie A =

73rd season of top-tier Italian football

Serie A
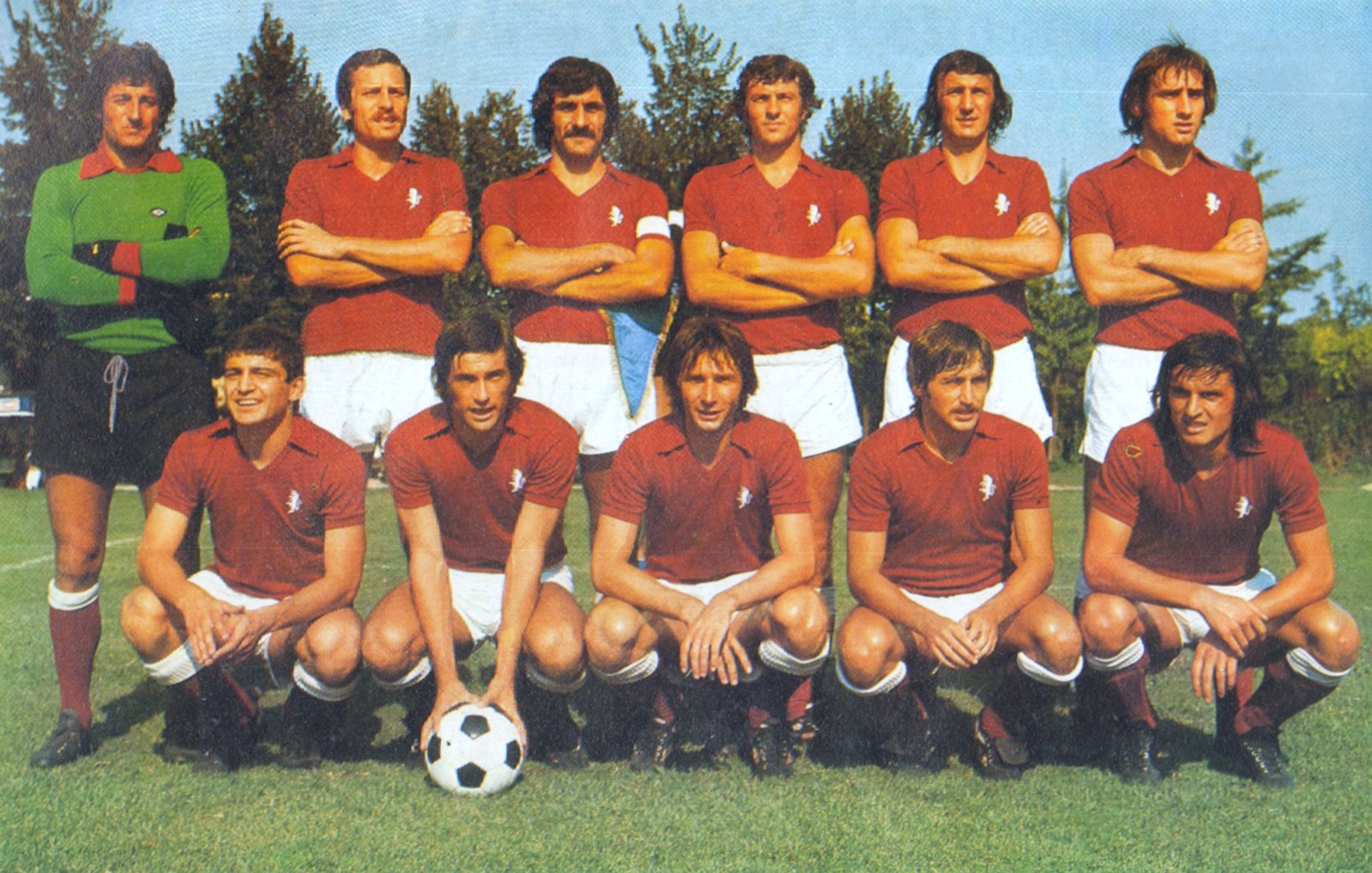
- 1975–76 Serie A winning Torino squad
- Season: 1975–76
- Dates: 5 October 1975 – 16 May 1976
- Champions: Torino; 7th title
- Relegated: Ascoli; Como; Cagliari
- European Cup: Torino
- Cup Winners' Cup: Napoli
- UEFA Cup: Juventus; Milan; Internazionale; Cesena
- Matches: 240
- Goals: 542 (2.26 per match)
- Top goalscorer: Paolo Pulici (21 goals)

Serie A 1975-76 team distribution

The 1975–76 Serie A season was won by Torino.

== Teams ==
Perugia, Como and Hellas Verona had been promoted from Serie B.

== Classification ==
Pos	Team	Pld	W	D	L	GF	GA	GD	Pts	Qualification or relegation
1	Torino (C)	30	18	9	3	49	22	+27	45	Qualification to European Cup
2	Juventus	30	18	7	5	46	26	+20	43	Qualification to UEFA Cup
3	Milan	30	15	8	7	42	28	+14	38	Qualification to UEFA Cup
4	Internazionale	30	14	9	7	36	28	+8	37	Qualification to UEFA Cup
5	Napoli	30	13	10	7	40	27	+13	36	Qualification to Cup Winners' Cup
6	Cesena	30	9	14	7	39	35	+4	32	Qualification to UEFA Cup
7	Bologna	30	9	14	7	32	32	0	32	
8	Perugia	30	10	11	9	31	34	−3	31	
9	Fiorentina	30	9	9	12	39	39	0	27	
10	Roma	30	6	13	11	25	31	−6	25	
11	Hellas Verona	30	8	8	14	35	46	−11	24	
12	Sampdoria	30	8	8	14	21	32	−11	24	
13	Lazio	30	6	11	13	35	40	−5	23	
14	Ascoli (R)	30	4	15	11	19	34	−15	23	Relegation to Serie B
15	Como (R)	30	5	11	14	28	36	−8	21	Relegation to Serie B
16	Cagliari (R)	30	5	9	16	25	52	−27	19	Relegation to Serie B

Source: Panini
(C) Champions; (R) Relegated

== Results ==
Home \ Away	ASC	BOL	CAG	CES	COM	FIO	INT	JUV	LAZ	MIL	NAP	PER	ROM	SAM	TOR	HEL
Ascoli		0–0	1–1	0–0	1–1	1–0	2–0	0–3	2–1	0–1	0–0	1–2	0–0	1–1	1–1	2–0
Bologna	1–1		0–0	5–3	1–1	1–1	1–2	1–4	1–0	1–1	2–0	1–1	2–1	1–0	1–0	0–0
Cagliari	0–0	1–2		1–2	1–0	2–1	0–0	0–1	2–1	1–3	1–1	0–0	1–5	5–3	0–0	0–2
Cesena	3–1	0–0	0–0		2–0	1–1	2–3	2–1	0–0	2–1	0–1	2–1	2–0	1–1	1–1	3–0
Como	0–0	2–1	3–0	0–0		0–1	3–0	2–2	2–2	1–4	0–1	0–0	0–0	0–0	0–1	2–1
Fiorentina	0–0	1–2	3–0	3–1	0–2		0–0	1–1	4–3	0–1	1–1	3–1	2–0	0–1	0–1	2–2
Internazionale	3–0	1–1	1–0	0–0	2–1	1–0		1–0	1–0	0–1	2–1	2–2	2–0	2–1	1–0	3–0
Juventus	2–1	1–0	1–0	3–3	1–1	4–2	2–0		2–0	1–1	2–1	1–0	1–1	2–0	0–2	2–1
Lazio	3–1	1–1	3–0	2–2	3–2	1–2	1–1	1–2		4–0	0–1	1–0	1–1	1–1	1–1	1–1
Milan	4–0	3–1	2–3	2–1	2–2	2–1	2–1	0–1	3–0		1–1	0–0	1–0	1–0	1–2	1–0
Napoli	0–0	2–2	3–1	2–0	1–0	1–2	3–1	1–1	1–0	1–0		4–0	2–1	0–0	0–0	0–1
Perugia	1–1	1–1	4–1	1–0	2–0	2–1	1–1	1–0	2–0	0–0	2–2		0–1	0–0	2–1	1–0
Roma	1–1	0–0	1–1	2–2	2–1	2–2	1–1	0–1	0–0	0–0	0–3	1–2		1–0	1–1	2–0
Sampdoria	1–0	0–1	2–1	0–1	1–0	0–0	0–2	0–2	0–1	0–1	2–1	3–1	1–0		0–0	2–0
Torino	3–1	3–1	5–1	1–1	1–0	4–3	2–1	2–0	2–1	2–1	3–1	3–0	1–0	2–0		4–2
Hellas Verona	1–0	1–0	2–1	2–2	3–2	1–2	1–1	1–2	2–2	2–2	2–4	3–1	0–1	4–1	0–0	

Source: Almanacco Illustrato del Calcio - La Storia 1898-2004, Panini Edizioni, Modena, September 2005 (in Italian)
Legend: Blue = home team win; Yellow = draw; Red = away team win.

== Top goalscorers ==
Rank	Player	Club	Goals
1	(Italy) Paolo Pulici	Torino	21
2	(Italy) Roberto Bettega	Juventus	15
2	(Italy) Francesco Graziani	Torino	15
4	(Italy) Giuseppe Savoldi	Napoli	14
5	(Italy) Egidio Calloni	Milan	13
6	(Italy) Roberto Boninsegna	Internazionale	10
6	(Italy) Claudio Desolati	Fiorentina	10
8	(Italy) Giuseppe Massa	Napoli	9
9	(Brazil) Sergio Clerici	Bologna	8
9	(Italy) Stefano Chiodi	Bologna	8
9	(Italy) Nello Saltutti	Sampdoria	8
9	(Italy) Giorgio Chinaglia	Lazio	8
9	(Italy) Giovanni Urban	Cesena	8

== Attendances ==
No.	Club	Average
1	Napoli	75,268
2	Roma	44,607
3	Lazio	40,859
4	Internazionale	40,214
5	Torino	39,077
6	Milan	38,370
7	Juventus	37,099
8	Fiorentina	32,539
9	Hellas Verona	28,254
10	Bologna	24,731
11	Sampdoria	22,457
12	Perugia	21,299
13	Cagliari	21,187
14	Cesena	17,891
15	Ascoli	17,532
16	Como	13,450

== References and sources ==
- Almanacco Illustrato del Calcio - La Storia 1898-2004, Panini Edizioni, Modena, September 2005
