= 1976–77 AC Milan season =

Milan Associazione Calcio
1976–77 season
- President: Vittorio Duina, then Felice Colombo
- Manager: Giuseppe Marchioro, then Nereo Rocco
- Stadium: San Siro
- Serie A: 10th
- Coppa Italia: Winners
- UEFA Cup: Round of 16
- Top goalscorer: League: Egidio Calloni (5); All: Egidio Calloni (15)
- Average home league attendance: 40,995
Home colours	Away colours

During the 1976–1977 season Milan Associazione Calcio competed in Serie A, Coppa Italia and UEFA Cup.

== Summary ==
The new AC Milan manager for the 1976–77 season was Giuseppe Marchioro while Gianni Rivera returned as team captain after the departure of Romeo Benetti, who moved to Juventus in exchange for Fabio Capello. Other significant changes in the transfer market were the sale of Luciano Chiarugi to Napoli and the signing of Giorgio Morini from Roma.

The season began with four group stage games in the first round of the Coppa Italia, where Milan got three wins (with Catania, Lazio and Novara) and a draw with Atalanta, ending the group in first place with seven points on an equal footing with the Bergamo players. The Rossoneri qualified to the second round, which would be played at the end of the season in June, thanks to the better goal difference (+6 against +5 of Atalanta).

In the league, Milan, after the win against Perugia on day one, collected nine draws, four defeats and only one victory, thus ending the first half of the season in 11th position with 13 points, three points above the relegation zone. The club sacked Marchioro and signed Nereo Rocco in his place. However, the substitution on the bench did not change the situation and the Rossoneri continued to struggle in the lower areas of the standings. On the penultimate day, Milan won the home game 3–2 against Catanzaro, also fighting against relegation, thus securing their stay in the first division, thanks also to the success in the next round against Cesena. In the end, Milan finished the championship in 10th place (paired with Genoa and Bologna), with 27 points from 17 draws, five wins and eight defeats, three points away from the relegation zone. The 17 draws in 30 games are a record that later would be beaten by Perugia in 1978–79 (19 draws), and by Udinese in 1982–83 with 20 draws, while the only five victories are still the lowest number of successes for Milan in a single championship since the Serie A was introduced in 1929–30.

In the UEFA Cup, Milan eliminated Romanian club Dinamo Bucharest (0–0 in the first leg in Bucharest and 2–1 in the return in Milan) in the round of 32 and Bulgarian club Akademik Sofia in the round of 32 (a 4–3 defeat in Sofia and a 2–0 home win). In the round of 16, Milan faced the Spanish side Athletic Bilbao (later finalist) who went through thanks to the 4–1 victory obtained in Bilbao and the 3–1 defeat suffered at the San Siro.

The season ended with the remaining matches in the Coppa Italia. Milan, in the group with Bologna, Napoli and SPAL, got five wins and a draw (in the second leg against Bologna) and qualified for the final on 3 July 1977, where they faced Inter. In the derby, the Rossoneri beat the Nerazzurri 2–0 with goals from Aldo Maldera and Giorgio Braglia in the second half and thus won their fourth Coppa Italia out of six finals played, also earning qualification for the 1977–78 European Cup Winners' Cup. AC Milan players Giorgio Braglia and Egidio Calloni were the top scorer of the event with six goals each. This was the last of Rocco's successes with the club, and at the end of the season he ended his career as manager.

== Squad ==
Note: Flags indicate national team as defined under FIFA eligibility rules; some limited exceptions apply. Players may hold more than one non-FIFA nationality.

Pos.	Nation	Player
GK	ITA	Enrico Albertosi
GK	ITA	Antonio Rigamonti
DF	ITA	Aldo Bet
DF	ITA	Angelo Anquilletti
DF	ITA	Simone Boldini
DF	ITA	Fulvio Collovati
DF	ITA	Maurizio Turone
DF	ITA	Giuseppe Sabadini
DF	ITA	Aldo Maldera
MF	ITA	Fabio Capello
MF	ITA	Giorgio Biasiolo

Pos.	Nation	Player
MF	ITA	Duino Gorin
MF	ITA	Gianni Rivera (Captain)
MF	ITA	Giovanni Lorini
MF	ITA	Giorgio Morini
FW	ITA	Giorgio Braglia
FW	ITA	Massimo Silva
FW	ITA	Alberto Bigon (vice-captain)
FW	ITA	Egidio Calloni
FW	ITA	Giorgio Tomba
FW	ITA	Francesco Vincenzi

== Transfers ==
In
Pos.	Name	from	Type
GK	Antonio Rigamonti	Como	
DF	Simone Boldini	Como	
MF	Fabio Capello	Juventus	
MF	Giovanni Lorini	Venezia	loan end
MF	Giorgio Morini	Roma	
MF	Vincenzo Zazzaro	Arezzo	loan end
FW	Giorgio Braglia	Napoli	
FW	Giovanni Sartori	Venezia	loan end
FW	Massimo Silva	Ascoli	

Out
Pos.	Name	To	Type
GK	Pierluigi Pizzaballa	Atalanta	
GK	Franco Tancredi	Rimini	
DF	Giulio Zignoli	Seregno	
MF	Romeo Benetti	Juventus	
MF	Franco Bergamaschi	Foggia	
MF	Michele De Nadai	Monza	
MF	Nevio Scala	Foggia	
MF	Vincenzo Zazzaro	Salernitana	
FW	Luciano Chiarugi	Napoli	
FW	Giovanni Sartori	Udinese	loan
FW	Silvano Villa	Ascoli	

== Competitions ==
=== Serie A ===
==== League table ====
Pos	Team	Pld	W	D	L	GF	GA	GD	Pts	Qualification or relegation
8	Roma	30	9	10	11	27	33	−6	28	
9	Hellas Verona	30	7	14	9	26	32	−6	28	
10	Milan	30	5	17	8	30	33	−3	27	Qualification to Cup Winners' Cup
11	Genoa	30	8	11	11	40	45	−5	27	
12	Bologna	30	8	11	11	24	31	−7	27	

Source: Panini

==== Matches ====
3 October 1976 1	Milan	2–1	Perugia	Milan
	Maldera 20'; Capello 23'	Report	43' Vannini	Stadium: Stadio San Siro; Attendance: 29,912; Referee: Pieri

10 October 1976 2	Sampdoria	0–0	Milan	Genoa
		Report		Stadium: Stadio Luigi Ferraris; Attendance: 26,980; Referee: Agnolin

24 October 1976 3	Milan	0–0	Fiorentina	Milan
		Report		Stadium: Stadio San Siro; Attendance: 40,124; Referee: Panzino

31 October 1976 4	Napoli	3–1	Milan	Naples
	Massa 5'; Orlandini 8'; Savoldi 80' (pen.)	Report	4' Vincenzi	Stadium: Stadio San Paolo; Attendance: 75,349; Referee: Bergamo

7 November 1976 5	Milan	2–3	Juventus	Milan
	Calloni 13'; Tardelli 17' (o.g.)	Report	21', 80' Bettega; 54' Benetti	Stadium: Stadio San Siro; Attendance: 64,712; Referee: Menegali

21 November 1976 6	Bologna	2–2	Milan	Bologna
	Chiodi 37'; Maselli 50'	Report	72' Silva; 90' Bigon	Stadium: Stadio Comunale; Attendance: 21,203; Referee: Agnolin

28 November 1976 7	Milan	1–1	Inter Milan	Milan
	Silva 81'	Report	43' Marini	Stadium: Stadio San Siro; Attendance: 64,652; Referee: Serafino

5 December 1976 8	Roma	1–1	Milan	Rome
	Di Bartolomei 16'	Report	7' Silva	Stadium: Stadio Olimpico; Attendance: 32,235; Referee: Gonella

12 December 1976 9	Milan	2–2	Genoa	Milan
	Bigon 13'; Morini 82'	Report	41' Ghetti; 76' Damiani	Stadium: Stadio San Siro; Attendance: 26,896; Referee: Reggiani

19 December 1976 10	Foggia	2–1	Milan	Foggia
	Pirazzini 22'; Delneri 70' (pen.)	Report	16' Sabadini	Stadium: Stadio Pino Zaccheria; Attendance: 22,134; Referee: Ciacci

2 January 1977 11	Lazio	1–2	Milan	Rome
	Martini 10'	Report	48' Maldera; 52' Calloni	Stadium: Stadio Olimpico; Attendance: 34,909; Referee: Barbaresco

9 January 1977 12	Milan	0–0	Hellas Verona	Milan
		Report		Stadium: Stadio San Siro; Attendance: 25,265; Referee: Trinchieri

16 January 1977 13	Milan	0–0	Torino	Milan
		Report		Stadium: Stadio San Siro; Attendance: 56,174; Referee: Menicucci

30 January 1977 14	Catanzaro	1–0	Milan	Catania
	Sperotto 13'	Report		Stadium: Stadio Cibali; Attendance: 27,252; Referee: Menegali

6 February 1977 15	Milan	0–0	Cesena	Milan
		Report		Stadium: Stadio San Siro; Attendance: 26,004; Referee: Benedetti

13 February 1977 16	Perugia	3–1	Milan	Perugia
	Vannini 15'; Novellino 54'; Cinquetti 79' (pen.)	Report	89' Rivera	Stadium: Stadio Comunale di Pian di Massiano; Attendance: 16,376; Referee: Serafino

20 February 1977 17	Milan	3–0	Sampdoria	Milan
	Morini 15', 80'; Calloni 51'	Report		Stadium: Stadio San Siro; Attendance: 34,331; Referee: Agnolin

27 February 1977 18	Fiorentina	1–1	Milan	Florence
	Bertarelli 71'	Report	21' (pen.) Calloni	Stadium: Stadio Comunale; Attendance: 39,739; Referee: Gonella

6 March 1977 19	Milan	1–1	Napoli	Milan
	Calloni 35'	Report	48' Speggiorin	Stadium: Stadio San Siro; Attendance: 51,443; Referee: Ciacci

13 March 1977 20	Juventus	2–1	Milan	Turin
	Boninsegna 38' (pen.); Causio 40'	Report	3' (o.g.) Scirea	Stadium: Stadio Comunale; Attendance: 52,507; Referee: Barbaresco

20 March 1977 21	Milan	1–1	Bologna	Milan
	Cereser 32' (o.g.)	Report	34' (o.g.) Bigon	Stadium: Stadio San Siro; Attendance: 22,073; Referee: Serafino

27 March 1977 22	Inter Milan	0–0	Milan	Milan
		Report		Stadium: Stadio San Siro; Attendance: 67,988; Referee: Casarin

3 April 1977 23	Milan	1–1	Roma	Milan
	Biasiolo 52'	Report	89' Pellegrini	Stadium: Stadio San Siro; Attendance: 29,972; Referee: Trinchieri

10 April 1977 24	Genoa	1–0	Milan	Genoa
	Damiani 10'	Report		Stadium: Stadio Luigi Ferraris; Attendance: 30,184; Referee: Gonella

17 April 1977 25	Milan	0–0	Foggia	Milan
		Report		Stadium: Stadio San Siro; Attendance: 46,474; Referee: Bergamo

24 April 1977 26	Milan	2–2	Lazio	Milan
	Bigon 14'; Rivera 30'	Report	44', 55' Giordano	Stadium: Stadio San Siro; Attendance: 41,599; Referee: Agnolin

1 May 1977 27	Hellas Verona	0–0	Milan	Verona
		Report		Stadium: Stadio Marcantonio Bentegodi; Attendance: 24,848; Referee: Serafino

8 May 1977 28	Torino	2–0	Milan	Turin
	Graziani 59'; Pulici 70'	Report		Stadium: Stadio Comunale; Attendance: 54,471; Referee: Lattanzi

15 May 1977 29	Milan	3–2	Catanzaro	Milan
	Silva 25'; Morini 52'; Bigon 56'	Report	68' (o.g.) Calloni; 87' Arbitrio	Stadium: Stadio San Siro; Attendance: 65,201; Referee: Menicucci

22 May 1977 30	Cesena	0–2	Milan	Cesena
		Report	40', 80' Rivera	Stadium: Stadio La Fiorita; Attendance: 15,512; Referee: Serafino

=== Coppa Italia ===
==== First round ====
Pos	Team	Pld	W	D	L	GF	GA	GD	Pts
1	Milan	4	3	1	0	8	2	+6	7
2	Atalanta	4	3	1	0	7	2	+5	7
3	Lazio	4	2	0	2	8	7	+1	4
4	Catania	4	1	0	3	2	6	−4	2
5	Novara	4	0	0	4	2	10	−8	0

29 August 1976 1	Milan	2–0	Catania	Milan
	Morini 32'; Bigon 80'			Stadium: Stadio San Siro; Attendance: 5,000; Referee: Gialluisi

1 September 1976 2	Lazio	1–2	Milan	Rome
	Giordano 32'		27', 41' Calloni	Stadium: Stadio Olimpico; Attendance: 60,000; Referee: Ciacci

5 September 1976 3	Milan	1–1	Atalanta	Milan
	Silva 72'		56' Fanna	Stadium: Stadio San Siro; Attendance: 30,000; Referee: Prati

19 September 1976 4	Novara	0–3	Milan	Novara
			25' Bet; 30' (o.g.) Vriz; 87' Silva	Stadium: Stadio Comunale; Attendance: 11,326; Referee: Trinchieri

==== Second round ====
Pos	Team	Pld	W	D	L	GF	GA	GD	Pts
1	Milan	6	5	1	0	15	3	+12	11
2	Bologna	6	2	2	2	6	7	−1	6
3	Napoli	6	2	2	2	4	5	−1	6
4	SPAL	6	0	1	5	0	10	−10	1

12 June 1977 1	Milan	3–1	Napoli	Milan
	Calloni 44' (pen.), 84'; Braglia 53'		79' (o.g.) Turone	Stadium: Stadio San Siro; Attendance: 40,000; Referee: Lattanzi

15 June 1977 2	Milan	5–0	Bologna	Milan
	Braglia 16'; Bigon 56'; Calloni 58'; Morini 70'; Maldera 74'			Stadium: Stadio San Siro; Attendance: 20,530; Referee: Lo Bello

19 June 1977 3	Napoli	1–2	Milan	Bari
	Chiarugi 48'		11' Calloni; 89' Bigon	Stadium: Stadio Comunale; Attendance: 30,000; Referee: Trinchieri

22 June 1977 4ª	Milan	2–0	SPAL	Milan
	Bigon 6'; Braglia 32'			Stadium: Stadio San Siro; Attendance: 16,440; Referee: Celli

26 June 1977 5	Bologna	1–1	Milan	Bologna
	Cresci 90'		8' Braglia	Stadium: Stadio Comunale; Attendance: 10,000; Referee: Benedetti

29 June 1977 6	SPAL	0–2	Milan	Ferrara
			65' Braglia; 85' Boldini	Stadium: Stadio Comunale; Attendance: 20,000; Referee: Redini

==== Final ====
3 July 1977	Milan	2–0	Inter Milan	Milan
	Maldera 64'; Braglia 89'			Stadium: Stadio San Siro; Attendance: 58,464; Referee: Gussoni

=== UEFA Cup ===
==== Round of 64 ====
15 September 1976 1	Dinamo București	0–0	Milan	Bucharest
				Stadium: Dinamo Stadium; Attendance: 20,000; Referee: Ohmsen

30 September 1976 2	Milan	2–1	Dinamo București	Milan
	Calloni 26'; Silva 74'		8' Sătmăreanu	Stadium: Stadio San Siro; Attendance: 36,194; Referee: Paterson

==== Round of 32 ====
20 October 1976 1	Akademik Sofia	4–3	Milan	Sofia
	Paunov 18'; Manolov 25'; Dimitrov 40' (pen.); Bigon 50' (o.g.)		33', 80' Capello; 47' Collovati	Stadium: Stadion Akademik; Attendance: 4,000; Referee: Konrath

3 November 1976 2	Milan	2–0	Akademik Sofia	Milan
	Calloni 13'; Morini 29'			Stadium: Stadio San Siro; Attendance: 25,869; Referee: Linemayr

==== Round of 16 ====
24 November 1976 1	Athletic Bilbao	4–1	Milan	Bilbao
	Dani 45' (pen.), 81'; Carlos 48', 86'		25' Capello	Stadium: San Mamés Stadium; Attendance: 35,000; Referee: Corver

8 December 1976 2	Milan	3–1	Athletic Bilbao	Milan
	Calloni 53', 83' (pen.); Biasiolo 60'		86' (pen.) Madariaga	Stadium: Stadio San Siro; Attendance: 22,898; Referee: Eschweiler

== Statistics ==
=== Squad statistics ===
Competition	Points	Home						Away						Total						GD
Competition	Points	G	W	D	L	Gs	Ga	G	W	D	L	Gs	Ga	G	W	D	L	Gs	Ga	GD
1976-77 Serie A	27	15	3	11	1	18	14	15	2	6	7	12	19	30	5	17	8	30	33	−3
1976-77 Coppa Italia	–	5	4	1	0	13	2	5	4	1	0	10	3	11	9	2	0	25	5	+20
1976-77 UEFA Cup	–	3	3	0	0	7	2	3	0	1	2	4	8	6	3	1	2	11	10	+1
Total	–	23	10	12	1	38	18	23	6	8	9	26	30	47	17	20	10	66	48	+18

=== Players statistics ===
No.	Pos	Nat	Player	Total		Serie A		Coppa Italia		UEFA Cup	
No.	Pos	Nat	Player	Apps	Goals	Apps	Goals	Apps	Goals	Apps	Goals
	DF	(Italy) ITA	Angelo Anquilletti	28	0	18	0	5	0	5	0
	DF	(Italy) ITA	Aldo Bet	42	1	26	0	11	1	5	0
	GK	(Italy) ITA	Enrico Albertosi	46	-48	30	-33	10	-5	6	-10
	DF	(Italy) ITA	Giuseppe Sabadini	33	1	21	1	7	0	5	0
	GK	(Italy) ITA	Antonio Rigamonti	1	0	0	-0	1	-0	0	-0
	MF	(Italy) ITA	Giorgio Biasiolo	30	2	17	1	9	0	4	1
	MF	(Italy) ITA	Duino Gorin	18	0	13	0	3	0	2	0
	MF	(Italy) ITA	Fabio Capello	37	4	26	1	6	0	5	3
	DF	(Italy) ITA	Simone Boldini	16	1	6	0	8	1	2	0
	FW	(Italy) ITA	Alberto Bigon	38	8	22	4	10	4	6	0
	DF	(Italy) ITA	Fulvio Collovati	17	1	11	0	3	0	3	1
	MF	(Italy) ITA	Gianni Rivera	39	4	27	4	7	0	5	0
	DF	(Italy) ITA	Maurizio Turone	36	0	22	0	10	0	4	0
	FW	(Italy) ITA	Giorgio Braglia	13	6	3	0	10	6	0	0
	MF	(Italy) ITA	Giovanni Lorini	3	0	2	0	1	0	0	0
	MF	(Italy) ITA	Giorgio Morini	39	7	24	4	9	2	6	1
	DF	(Italy) ITA	Aldo Maldera	43	4	29	2	9	2	5	0
	FW	(Italy) ITA	Massimo Silva	30	7	20	4	6	2	4	1
	FW	(Italy) ITA	Egidio Calloni	43	15	29	5	9	6	5	4
	FW	(Italy) ITA	Giorgio Tomba	1	0	0	0	1	0	0	0
	FW	(Italy) ITA	Francesco Vincenzi	11	1	7	1	0	0	4	0

== See also ==
- AC Milan

== Bibliography ==
- Almanacco illustrato del Milan, ed: 2, March 2005. Panini.
- Enrico Tosi. La storia del Milan, May 2005. Italia/Italy cid Tosi.
- Milan. Sempre con te, December 2009. Mondadori. 2009. ISBN 978-88-04-59118-4.
