= 1975–76 AC Milan season =

Milan Associazione Calcio
1975–76 season
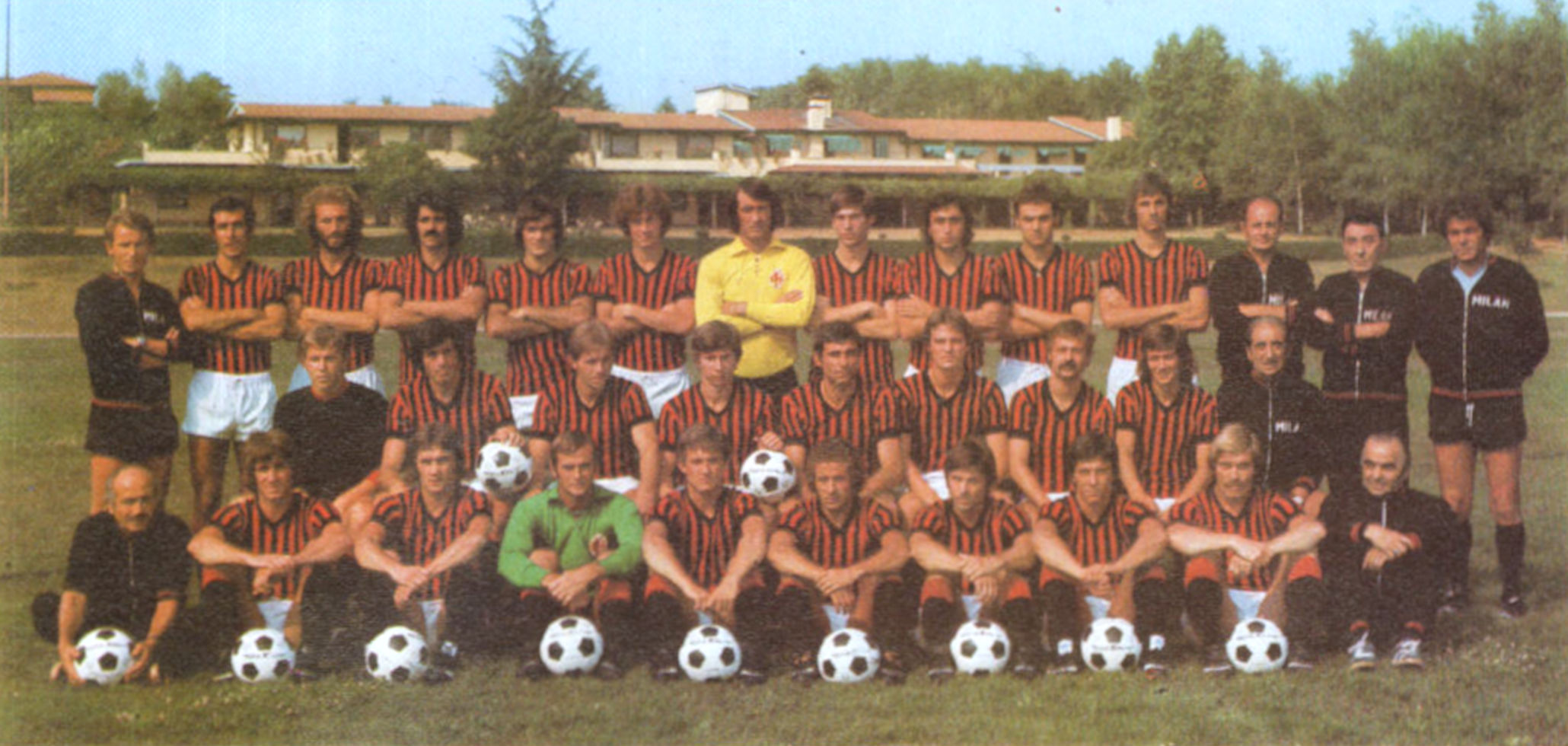
- President: Albino Buticchi, then Bruno Pardi, then Vittorio Duina
- Manager: Gustavo Giagnoni, then Giovanni Trapattoni, then Paolo Barison (Nereo Rocco as technical director)
- Stadium: San Siro
- Serie A: 3rd
- Coppa Italia: Second round
- UEFA Cup: Quarter-finals
- Top goalscorer: League: Egidio Calloni (13); All: Egidio Calloni (19)
- Average home league attendance: 38,370
Home colours	Away colours

During the 1975–1976 season Milan Associazione Calcio competed in Serie A, Coppa Italia and UEFA Cup.

== Summary ==
At management level, the 1975–76 season was troubled for Milan: at the end of the previous season Albino Buticchi, president of the club, had come into conflict with Gianni Rivera for having planned an exchange transfer between the Golden Boy himself and Torino's Claudio Sala. In September 1975 Rivera acquired from Buticchi the majority of the shares of AC Milan, and shortly before the end of the year Bruno Pardi assumed the presidency. In February of the following year Rivera sold his shares to the entrepreneur Vittorio Duina who became the new president of Milan the following May.

The football season began with Gustavo Giagnoni as manager for the first four group matches of the first round of the Coppa Italia, where Milan got three wins (with Perugia, Brindisi and SPAL) and a draw (in the last match against Catanzaro), ending the group in first place with seven points and thus qualifying for the second round, which would be held at the end of the season. Giagnoni also directed the Rossoneri in the round of 64 of the UEFA Cup, which saw Milan going through against English side Everton thanks to a 0–0 draw in Liverpool and a 1–0 victory in Milan, before leaving the position of coach. Nereo Rocco is called back as technical director of the team, with Giovanni Trapattoni as manager.

In the league, Milan collected eight wins, three draws and three defeats in the first half of the season, finishing in third place on equal points with Napoli and Cesena. Even in the second half, the Rossoneri remained in the upper areas of the standings and finished the competition in third position with 38 points behind Torino and Juventus. The placement was valid for the qualification to the 1976-77 UEFA Cup.

In the UEFA Cup, after beating Everton in the round of 64, Milan eliminated the Irish side Athlone Town in the round of 32 (0–0 in the first leg in Athlone and 3–0 in the second leg in Milan) and in the round of 16 the Soviets Spartak Moscow (4–0 home win and 2–0 defeat in Sochi). In the quarter-finals, Milan faced the Belgians of Club Bruges who went through thanks to the 2–0 victory obtained in Bruges and the 2–1 defeat suffered at San Siro.

The season finished with the remaining Coppa Italia matches. After the first match played in May and won against Sampdoria with Rocco and Trapattoni on the bench, in the following matches in June Paolo Barison replaced Trapattoni, who moved to Juventus. Milan, in group B with Sampdoria, Napoli and Fiorentina, obtained two victories (with Sampdoria), two draws (with Fiorentina) and two defeats (with Napoli) finishing with six points, behind the Neapolitans (winners of group with 9 points and qualified for the final) and the Viola.

== Squad ==
Note: Flags indicate national team as defined under FIFA eligibility rules; some limited exceptions apply. Players may hold more than one non-FIFA nationality.

Pos.	Nation	Player
GK	ITA	Enrico Albertosi
GK	ITA	Pier Luigi Pizzaballa
GK	ITA	Franco Tancredi
GK	ITA	Giuseppe Cafaro
DF	ITA	Aldo Bet
DF	ITA	Angelo Anquilletti (vice-captain)
DF	ITA	Filippo Citterio
DF	ITA	Fulvio Collovati
DF	ITA	Luciano Zecchini
DF	ITA	Maurizio Turone
DF	ITA	Giuseppe Sabadini
DF	ITA	Aldo Maldera
DF	ITA	Giulio Zignoli
MF	ITA	Romeo Benetti (Captain)

Pos.	Nation	Player
MF	ITA	Giorgio Biasiolo
MF	ITA	Duino Gorin
MF	ITA	Gianni Rivera
MF	ITA	Franco Bergamaschi
MF	ITA	Michele De Nadai
MF	ITA	Walter De Vecchi
MF	ITA	Nevio Scala
FW	ITA	Luciano Chiarugi
FW	ITA	Graziano Gori
FW	ITA	Alberto Bigon
FW	ITA	Egidio Calloni
FW	ITA	Alessandro Turini
FW	ITA	Silvano Villa
FW	ITA	Francesco Vincenzi

== Transfers ==
In
Pos.	Name	from	Type
GK	Giuseppe Cafaro	Barletta	loan end
DF	Franco Fasoli	Chioggia Sottomarina}	loan end
DF	Giulio Zignoli	Varese	loan end
MF	Franco Bergamaschi	Genoa	loan end
MF	Michele De Nadai	Lecco	
MF	Walter De Vecchi	Varese	loan end
MF	Nevio Scala	Inter	
FW	Graziano Gori	Spezia	
FW	Alessandro Turini	Verona	loan end
FW	Silvano Villa	Arezzo	loan end
FW	Francesco Vincenzi	Monza	

Out
Pos.	Name	To	Type
DF	Franco Fasoli	Monza	loan
MF	Giovanni Lorini	Venezia	loan
FW	Gianni Bui	Varese	
FW	Giovanni Sartori	Venezia	loan
FW	Giorgio Skoglund	Chioggia Sottomarina	
GK	Giuseppe Cafaro	Brescia	
DF	Filippo Citterio	Palermo	
DF	Luciano Zecchini	Sampdoria	
MF	Walter De Vecchi	Monza	
FW	Graziano Gori	Taranto	
FW	Alessandro Turini	Taranto	

== Competitions ==
=== Serie A ===
==== League table ====
Pos	Team	Pld	W	D	L	GF	GA	GD	Pts	Qualification or relegation
1	Torino (C)	30	18	9	3	49	22	+27	45	Qualification to European Cup
2	Juventus	30	18	7	5	46	26	+20	43	Qualification to UEFA Cup
3	Milan	30	15	8	7	42	28	+14	38	Qualification to UEFA Cup
4	Internazionale	30	14	9	7	36	28	+8	37	Qualification to UEFA Cup
5	Napoli	30	13	10	7	40	27	+13	36	Qualification to Cup Winners' Cup

Source: Panini
(C) Champions

==== Matches ====
5 October 1975 1	Perugia	0–0	Milan	Perugia
		Report		Stadium: Stadio Comunale di Pian di Massiano; Attendance: 29,660; Referee: Gonella

12 October 1975 2	Milan	1–0	Sampdoria	Milan
	Bigon 31'	Report		Stadium: Stadio San Siro; Attendance: 22,644; Referee: Trinchieri

19 October 1975 3	Bologna	1–1	Milan	Bologna
	Chiodi 74'	Report	63' Vincenzi	Stadium: Stadio Comunale; Attendance: 33,655; Referee: Serafino

2 November 1975 4	Milan	4–0	Ascoli	Milan
	Vincenzi 35'; Bigon 43', 79'; Calloni 74'	Report		Stadium: Stadio San Siro; Attendance: 23,237; Referee: Benedetti

9 November 1975 5	Roma	0–0	Milan	Rome
		Report		Stadium: Stadio Olimpico; Attendance: 58,618; Referee: Reggiani

16 November 1975 6	Milan	0–1	Juventus	Milan
		Report	75' Gori	Stadium: Stadio San Siro; Attendance: 78,535; Referee: Menicucci

30 November 1975 7	Napoli	1–0	Milan	Naples
	Savoldi 40' (pen.)	Report		Stadium: Stadio San Paolo; Attendance: 80,858; Referee: Gonella

7 December 1975 8	Milan	2–1	Inter Milan	Milan
	Calloni 51'; Villa 74'	Report	56' Marini	Stadium: Stadio San Siro; Attendance: 52,806; Referee: Agnolin

14 December 1975 9	Milan	1–2	Torino	Milan
	Maldera 51'	Report	16' Zaccarelli; 84' Graziani	Stadium: Stadio San Siro; Attendance: 37,538; Referee: Ciacci

21 December 1975 10	Fiorentina	0–1	Milan	Florence
		Report	67' Chiarugi	Stadium: Stadio Comunale; Attendance: 36,759; Referee: Serafino

4 January 1976 11	Como	1–4	Milan	Como
	Iachini 87'	Report	18', 64' Chiarugi; 26' Calloni; 77' Bigon	Stadium: Stadio Giuseppe Sinigaglia; Attendance: 20,203; Referee: Menicucci

11 January 1976 12	Milan	1–0	Hellas Verona	Milan
	Busatta 59' (o.g.)	Report		Stadium: Stadio San Siro; Attendance: 36,081; Referee: Bergamo

18 January 1976 13	Cesena	2–1	Milan	Cesena
	Danova 33'; De Ponti 77'	Report	66' (pen.) Calloni	Stadium: Stadio La Fiorita; Attendance: 29,758; Referee: Lattanzi

25 January 1976 14	Milan	3–0	Lazio	Milan
	Benetti 60' (pen.); Calloni 62'; Rivera 88'	Report		Stadium: Stadio San Siro; Attendance: 38,270; Referee: Gialluisi

1 February 1976 15	Cagliari	1–3	Milan	Cagliari
	Viola 83' (pen.)	Report	47', 78' (pen.) Calloni; 86' Biasiolo	Stadium: Stadio Sant'Elia; Attendance: 22,722; Referee: Trinchieri

8 February 1976 16	Milan	0–0	Perugia	Milan
		Report		Stadium: Stadio San Siro; Attendance: 35,445; Referee: Barboni

15 February 1976 17	Sampdoria	0–1	Milan	Bergamo
		Report	16' Chiarugi	Stadium: Stadio Comunale; Attendance: 16,893; Referee: Reggiani

22 February 1976 18	Milan	3–1	Bologna	Milan
	Calloni 5', 52'; Benetti 70'	Report	62' Maselli	Stadium: Stadio San Siro; Attendance: 39,736; Referee: Panzino

29 February 1976 19	Ascoli	0–1	Milan	Ascoli Piceno
		Report	30' Benetti	Stadium: Stadio Cino e Lillo Del Duca; Attendance: 24,254; Referee: Bergamo

7 March 1976 20	Milan	1–0	Roma	Milan
	Calloni 61'	Report		Stadium: Stadio San Siro; Attendance: 30,093; Referee: Trinchieri

14 March 1976 21	Juventus	1–1	Milan	Turin
	Capello 60'	Report	30' Sabadini	Stadium: Stadio Comunale; Attendance: 55,974; Referee: Agnolin

21 March 1976 22	Milan	1–1	Napoli	Milan
	Calloni 40' (pen.)	Report	57' Massa	Stadium: Stadio San Siro; Attendance: 45,430; Referee: Menicucci

28 March 1976 23	Inter Milan	0–1	Milan	Milan
		Report	41' Bigon	Stadium: Stadio San Siro; Attendance: 70,485; Referee: Gonella

4 April 1976 24	Torino	2–1	Milan	Turin
	Graziani 28'; Garritano 80'	Report	90' (pen.) Calloni	Stadium: Stadio Comunale; Attendance: 49,330; Referee: Menegali

11 April 1976 25	Milan	2–1	Fiorentina	Milan
	Benetti 2', 23' (pen.)	Report	67' Caso	Stadium: Stadio San Siro; Attendance: 37,107; Referee: Gialluisi

18 April 1976 26	Milan	2–2	Como	Milan
	Sabadini 40'; Chiarugi 50'	Report	44' (pen.) Rigamonti; 64' Fontolan	Stadium: Stadio San Siro; Attendance: 34,589; Referee: Mascali

25 April 1976 27	Hellas Verona	2–2	Milan	Verona
	Zigoni 18'; Moro 76'	Report	27' Chiarugi; 68' Vincenzi	Stadium: Stadio Marcantonio Bentegodi; Attendance: 39,177; Referee: Reggiani

2 May 1976 28	Milan	2–1	Cesena	Milan
	Biasiolo 35'; De Nadai 80'	Report	84' Urban	Stadium: Stadio San Siro; Attendance: 35,886; Referee: Schena

9 May 1976 29	Lazio	4–0	Milan	Rome
	D'Amico 10' (pen.); Giordano 38'; Garlaschelli 60'; Badiani 89'	Report		Stadium: Stadio Olimpico; Attendance: 48,660; Referee: Ciacci

16 May 1976 30	Milan	2–3	Cagliari	Milan
	Calloni 23'; Chiarugi 83'	Report	63' Leschio; 64', 78' (pen.) Virdis	Stadium: Stadio San Siro; Attendance: 27,725; Referee: Lapi

=== Coppa Italia ===
==== First round ====
Pos	Team	Pld	W	D	L	GF	GA	GD	Pts
1	Milan (A)	4	3	1	0	7	2	+5	7
2	SPAL (B)	4	2	1	1	4	2	+2	5
3	Perugia (A)	4	1	2	1	5	4	+1	4
4	Catanzaro (B)	4	1	1	2	4	7	−3	3
5	Brindisi (B)	4	0	1	3	1	6	−5	1

Source: rsssf.com
Rules for classification: 1) points; 2) goal difference; 3) number of goals scored.
(A) Serie A; (B) Serie B

27 August 1975 1	Milan	3–1	Perugia	Milan
	Bigon 18'; Calloni 53', 74' (pen.)		59' Scarpa	Stadium: Stadio San Siro; Attendance: 10,000; Referee: Moretto

31 August 1975 2	Brindisi	0–2	Milan	Brindisi
			77' Chiarugi; 79' Sabadini	Stadium: Stadio Comunale; Attendance: 15,000; Referee: Trinchieri

7 September 1975 3	Milan	1–0	SPAL	Milan
	Calloni 37' (pen.)			Stadium: Stadio San Siro; Attendance: 9,005; Referee: Benedetti

21 September 1975 5	Catanzaro	1–1	Milan	Catanzaro
	Spelta 87' (pen.)		55' Bergamaschi	Stadium: Stadio Comunale; Attendance: 13,834; Referee: Reggiani

==== Second round ====
19 May 1976 1	Sampdoria	0–2	Milan	Genoa
			4' Rivera; 87' Chiarugi	Stadium: Stadio Luigi Ferraris; Attendance: 12,000; Referee: Serafino

9 June 1976 2	Milan	0–2	Napoli	Milan
			56' (pen.) Savoldi; 71' Boccolini	Stadium: Stadio San Siro; Attendance: 30,000; Referee: Reggiani

13 June 1976 3	Fiorentina	2–2	Milan	Florence
	Bresciani 70'; Antognoni 75'		10' Maldera; 80' (o.g.) Brizi	Stadium: Stadio Comunale; Attendance: 18,511; Referee: Agnolin

16 June 1976 4	Milan	3–1	Sampdoria	Milan
	Benetti 19'; Orlandi 39' (o.g.); Chiarugi 88'		27' Bedin	Stadium: Stadio San Siro; Attendance: 3,000; Referee: Schena

20 June 1976 5	Napoli	2–1	Milan	Naples
	Savoldi 16', 89' (pen.)		81' (pen.) Benetti	Stadium: Stadio San Paolo; Attendance: 35,000; Referee: Panzino

26 June 1976 6	Milan	1–1	Fiorentina	Milan
	De Nadai 89'		49' Speggiorin	Stadium: Stadio San Siro; Attendance: 35,000; Referee: Serafino

=== UEFA Cup ===
==== Round of 64 ====
17 September 1975 1	Everton	0–0	Milan	Liverpool
				Stadium: Goodison Park; Attendance: 31,917; Referee: Delcourt

1 October 1975 2	Milan	1–0	Everton	Milan
	Calloni 68' (pen.)			Stadium: Stadio San Siro; Attendance: 35,825; Referee: Glöckner

==== Round of 32 ====
22 October 1975 1	Athlone Town	0–0	Milan	Athlone
				Stadium: St Mel's Park; Attendance: 9,500; Referee: Lund-Sørensen

5 November 1975 2	Milan	3–0	Athlone Town	Milan
	Vincenzi 63'; Benetti 70', 79' (pen.)			Stadium: Stadio San Siro; Attendance: 42,849; Referee: Ghiță

==== Round of 16 ====
26 November 1975 1	Milan	4–0	Spartak Moscow	Milan
	Calloni 19', 71'; Bigon 48'; Maldera 51'			Stadium: Stadio San Siro; Attendance: 16,290; Referee: Racine

10 December 1975 2	Spartak Moscow	2–0	Milan	Sochi
	Papaev 60'; Lovčev 84'			Stadium: Sochi Central Stadium; Attendance: 15,000; Referee: Matthewson

==== Quarterfinals ====
3 March 1976 1	Club Brugge	2–0	Milan	Bruges
	le Fevre 4'; Krieger 71'			Stadium: Olympiastadion; Attendance: 50,000; Referee: Vigliani

17 March 1976 2	Milan	2–1	Club Brugge	Milan
	Bigon 32'; Chiarugi 66'		74' Hinderyckx	Stadium: Stadio San Siro; Attendance: 44,570; Referee: Mackenzie

== Statistics ==
=== Squad statistics ===
Competition	Points	Home						Away						Total						GD
Competition	Points	G	W	D	L	Gs	Ga	G	W	D	L	Gs	Ga	G	W	D	L	Gs	Ga	GD
1975-76 Serie A	38	15	9	3	3	25	13	15	6	5	4	17	15	30	15	8	7	42	28	+14
1975-76 Coppa Italia	–	5	3	1	1	8	5	5	2	2	1	8	5	10	5	3	2	16	10	+6
1975-76 UEFA Cup	–	4	4	0	0	10	1	4	0	2	2	0	4	8	4	2	2	10	5	+5
Total	–	24	16	4	4	43	19	24	8	9	7	25	24	48	24	13	11	68	43	+25

=== Players statistics ===
No.	Pos	Nat	Player	Total		Serie A		Coppa Italia		UEFA Cup	
No.	Pos	Nat	Player	Apps	Goals	Apps	Goals	Apps	Goals	Apps	Goals
	DF	(Italy) ITA	Angelo Anquilletti	40	0	22	0	10	0	8	0
	DF	(Italy) ITA	Aldo Bet	40	0	28	0	4	0	8	0
	GK	(Italy) ITA	Enrico Albertosi	47	-41	30	-28	9	-8	8	-5
	DF	(Italy) ITA	Giuseppe Sabadini	30	3	18	2	5	1	7	0
	GK	(Italy) ITA	Pier Luigi Pizzaballa	0	0	0	-0	0	-0	0	-0
	MF	(Italy) ITA	Giorgio Biasiolo	18	2	12	2	3	0	3	0
	MF	(Italy) ITA	Duino Gorin	38	0	25	0	7	0	6	0
	MF	(Italy) ITA	Franco Bergamaschi	13	1	5	0	6	1	2	0
	DF	(Italy) ITA	Luciano Zecchini	4	0	0	0	3	0	1	0
	FW	(Italy) ITA	Alberto Bigon	42	8	24	5	10	1	8	2
	DF	(Italy) ITA	Romeo Benetti	45	9	30	5	8	2	7	2
	GK	(Italy) ITA	José Cafaro	0	0	0	-0	0	-0	0	-0
	DF	(Italy) ITA	Filippo Citterio	0	0	0	0	0	0	0	0
	DF	(Italy) ITA	Fulvio Collovati	2	0	0	0	2	0	0	0
	DF	(Italy) ITA	Giulio Zignoli	5	0	2	0	3	0	0	0
	MF	(Italy) ITA	Gianni Rivera	22	2	14	1	5	1	3	0
	DF	(Italy) ITA	Maurizio Turone	39	0	27	0	5	0	7	0
	FW	(Italy) ITA	Luciano Chiarugi	37	11	23	7	10	3	4	1
	MF	(Italy) ITA	Michele De Nadai	5	2	1	1	3	1	1	0
	MF	(Italy) ITA	Walter De Vecchi	0	0	0	0	0	0	0	0
	MF	(Italy) ITA	Nevio Scala	37	0	23	0	8	0	6	0
	DF	(Italy) ITA	Aldo Maldera	41	3	27	1	6	1	8	1
	FW	(Italy) ITA	Graziano Gori	1	0	0	0	1	0	0	0
	FW	(Italy) ITA	Egidio Calloni	39	19	25	13	7	3	7	3
	FW	(Italy) ITA	Alessandro Turini	0	0	0	0	0	0	0	0
	FW	(Italy) ITA	Silvano Villa	12	1	3	1	7	0	2	0
	FW	(Italy) ITA	Francesco Vincenzi	17	4	12	3	2	0	3	1
	GK	(Italy) ITA	Franco Tancredi	2	-2	0	-0	2	-2	0	-0

== See also ==
- AC Milan

== Bibliography ==
- Almanacco illustrato del Milan, ed: 2, March 2005. Panini.
- Enrico Tosi. La storia del Milan, May 2005. Italia/Italy cid Tosi.
- Milan. Sempre con te, December 2009. Mondadori. 2009. ISBN 978-88-04-59118-4.
