= 1977 Coppa Italia final =

29th Coppa Italia final
- Event: 1976–77 Coppa Italia
Milan	Internazionale
2	0
- Date: 3 July 1977
- Venue: Stadio Giuseppe Meazza, Milan
- Referee: Cesare Gussoni

The 1977 Coppa Italia final was the final of the 1976–77 Coppa Italia. The match was played on 3 July 1977 between Milan and Internazionale. Milan won 2–0. It was Milan's eighth final and fourth victory.

== Match ==
3 July 1977
20:30

Milan	2–0	Internazionale
Maldera 64'; Braglia 89'

Stadio Giuseppe Meazza, Milan
Referee: Cesare Gussoni

Milan	Internazionale

GK	1	(Italy) Enrico Albertosi
RB	2	(Italy) Aldo Bet
CB	3	(Italy) Aldo Maldera
CB	4	(Italy) Giuseppe Sabadini
LB	5	(Italy) Maurizio Turone
MF	6	(Italy) Alberto Bigon
MF	7	(Italy) Giorgio Morini	(substituted off) 12'
MF	8	(Italy) Gianni Rivera (c)
MF	9	(Italy) Giorgio Biasiolo
FW	10	(Italy) Egidio Calloni
FW	11	(Italy) Giorgio Braglia
Substitutes:
DF		(Italy) Simone Boldini	(substituted on) 12'
Manager:
(Italy) Nereo Rocco

GK	1	(Italy) Ivano Bordon
DF	2	(Italy) Angiolino Gasparini
DF	3	(Italy) Adriano Fedele
DF	4	(Italy) Giacinto Facchetti (c)
DF	5	(Italy) Nazzareno Canuti	(substituted off) 70'
MF	6	(Italy) Giampiero Marini
MF	7	(Italy) Claudio Merlo	(substituted off) 76'
MF	8	(Italy) Gabriele Oriali
FW	9	(Italy) Giuseppe Pavone
FW	10	(Italy) Sandro Mazzola
FW	11	(Italy) Pietro Anastasi
Substitutes:
DF		(Italy) Viviano Guida	(substituted on) 70'
MF		(Italy) Maurizio Grosselli	(substituted on) 76'
Manager:
(Italy) Giuseppe Chiappella

== See also ==
- 1976–77 AC Milan season
- Derby della Madonnina
