= 1974–75 AC Milan season =

Milan Associazione Calcio
1974–75 season
- President: Albino Buticchi
- Manager: Gustavo Giagnoni
- Stadium: San Siro
- Serie A: 5th
- Coppa Italia: Runners-up
- Top goalscorer: League: Egidio Calloni (11); All: Egidio Calloni (17)
- Average home league attendance: 44,796
Home colours	Away colours

During the 1974–1975 season Milan Associazione Calcio competed in Serie A and Coppa Italia.

== Summary ==
The new coach of Milan for the 1974–75 season is Gustavo Giagnoni. AC Milan is among the most active clubs on the market and sign, among others, goalkeeper Enrico Albertosi (from Cagliari), defenders Aldo Bet and Luciano Zecchini (from Verona and Turin respectively), midfielder Duino Gorin and forward Egidio Calloni (both from Varese). Karl-Heinz Schnellinger, on the other hand, left the team after nine seasons and the Rossoneri squad returned to being made up exclusively of players of Italian nationality (a condition that had not occurred since the 1944–45 season and which would last until 1981–82).

The season began with four group games in the first round of the Coppa Italia, where Milan obtained tow wins (with Perugia and Parma) and two draws (with Brescia and Cesena) closing the group in first place with 6 points and thus qualifying for the second round, which would be played at the end of the season, between May and June.

In the league, after the draw on the first day with Sampdoria and the defeat at Juventus in the second, Milan obtained nine consecutive games without defeats (four wins and five draws) which allowed them to move to the upper areas of the standings. The Rossoneri ended the first half of the season with 18 points, and in the second round they maintained the same performance, thus finishing the championship in fifth place with 36 points, the result of 12 wins, 12 draws and six defeats. The placement guaranteed Milan the qualification for the 1975-76 UEFA Cup.

Towards the end of the season, captain Gianni Rivera came into conflict with the president Albino Buticchi, due to a plan of the latter to exchange the Golden Boy with Torino's Claudio Sala. Rivera, embittered by this declaration, did not show up for training for two days, and was put out of the squad. After confirmation as president of Buticchi by the AC Milan board of directors in May 1975, Rivera announced his decision to leave football. However, he would return to play the following season after acquiring the majority stake of the club from Buticchi, giving the control of the club to Bruno Pardi, who in turn handed over the presidency of the club to Vittorio Duina, the new owner of Milan, in May 1976.

The season ended with the remaining matches of the Coppa Italia, where captaincy of the Rossoneri squad, given the absence of Rivera, was given to Romeo Benetti. Milan, in the group with Bologna, Inter and Juventus, obtained four wins, a draw and a defeat, and qualified for the final on 28 June 1975 at the Stadio Olimpico in Rome, where they faced Fiorentina. Milan, after having recovered the advantage of the Viola twice, were beaten 3–2 by Fiorentina who thus won their fourth Coppa Italia.

== Squad ==
Note: Flags indicate national team as defined under FIFA eligibility rules; some limited exceptions apply. Players may hold more than one non-FIFA nationality.

Pos.	Nation	Player
GK	ITA	Enrico Albertosi
GK	ITA	Pier Luigi Pizzaballa
GK	ITA	Franco Tancredi
DF	ITA	Aldo Bet
DF	ITA	Angelo Anquilletti (vice-captain)
DF	ITA	Filippo Citterio
DF	ITA	Vinicio Pasin
DF	ITA	Luciano Zecchini
DF	ITA	Maurizio Turone
DF	ITA	Giuseppe Sabadini
DF	ITA	Roberto Casone
DF	ITA	Aldo Maldera

Pos.	Nation	Player
DF	ITA	Riccardo Martelli
MF	ITA	Romeo Benetti
MF	ITA	Giorgio Biasiolo
MF	ITA	Duino Gorin
MF	ITA	Gianni Rivera (Captain)
MF	ITA	Giovanni Lorini
FW	ITA	Luciano Chiarugi
FW	ITA	Gianni Bui
FW	ITA	Alberto Bigon
FW	ITA	Egidio Calloni
FW	ITA	Giovanni Sartori
FW	ITA	Giorgio Skoglunf

== Transfers ==
In
Pos.	Name	from	Type
GK	Enrico Albertosi	Cagliari	
GK	Franco Tancredi	Giulianova	
DF	Aldo Bet	Verona	
DF	Filippo Citterio	Seregno	
DF	Vinicio Pasin	Conegliano	
DF	Luciano Zecchini	Torino	
MF	Roberto Casone	Como	loan end
MF	Duino Gorin	Varese	
MF	Riccardo Martelli	Livorno	
MF	Vincenzo Zazzaro	Reggina	loan end
FW	Gianni Bui	Torino	
FW	Egidio Calloni	Varese	
FW	Silvano Villa	Foggia	loan end

Out
Pos.	Name	To	Type
GK	Giuseppe Cafaro	Barletta	loan
GK	Villiam Vecchi	Cagliari	
DF	Dario Dolci	Ternana	
DF	Franco Fasoli	Chioggia Sottomarina	loan
DF	Enrico Lanzi	Varese	
DF	Karl-Heinz Schnellinger	Tennis Borussia Berlin	
DF	Giulio Zignoli	Varese	loan
MF	Franco Bergamaschi	Genoa	loan
MF	Ottavio Bianchi	Cagliari	
MF	Walter De Vecchi	Varese	loan
MF	Riccardo Sogliano		career end
MF	Vincenzo Zazzaro	Arezzo	loan
FW	Carlo Tresoldi	Varese	
FW	Alessandro Turini	Verona	loan
FW	Silvano Villa	Arezzo	loan
FW	Francesco Vincenzi	Monza	
DF	Vinicio Pasin	Catania	
MF	Roberto Casone	Arezzo	
MF	Riccardo Martelli	Livorno	

== Competitions ==
=== Serie A ===
==== League table ====
Pos	Team	Pld	W	D	L	GF	GA	GD	Pts	Qualification or relegation
3	Roma	30	15	9	6	27	15	+12	39	Qualification to UEFA Cup
4	Lazio	30	14	9	7	34	28	+6	37	Qualification to UEFA Cup
5	Milan	30	12	12	6	37	22	+15	36	Qualification to UEFA Cup
6	Torino	30	11	13	6	40	30	+10	35	
7	Bologna	30	10	12	8	36	33	+3	32	

Source: Panini

==== Matches ====
6 October 1974 1	Milan	0–0	Sampdoria	Milan
		Report		Stadium: Stadio San Siro; Attendance: 45,317; Referee: Prati

13 October 1974 2	Juventus	2–1	Milan	Turin
	Bettega 20'; Anastasi 57'	Report	32' Benetti	Stadium: Stadio Comunale; Attendance: 62,349; Referee: Gialluisi

20 October 1974 3	Milan	1–1	Fiorentina	Milan
	Sabadini 84'	Report	66' Saltutti	Stadium: Stadio San Siro; Attendance: 58,664; Referee: Serafino

27 October 1974 4	Roma	0–1	Milan	Rome
		Report	84' Calloni	Stadium: Stadio Olimpico; Attendance: 63,615; Referee: Menicucci

3 November 1974 5	Milan	1–0	Lanerossi Vicenza	Milan
	Chiarugi 69'	Report		Stadium: Stadio San Siro; Attendance: 39,662; Referee: Reggiani

10 November 1974 6	Inter Milan	0–0	Milan	Milan
		Report		Stadium: Stadio San Siro; Attendance: 71,206; Referee: Menegali

24 November 1974 7	Milan	2–0	Ascoli	Milan
	Chiarugi 6', 29'	Report		Stadium: Stadio San Siro; Attendance: 31,762; Referee: V. Lattanzi

1 December 1974 8	Torino	1–1	Milan	Turin
	Zaccarelli 17'	Report	44' Chiarugi	Stadium: Stadio Comunale; Attendance: 44,187; Referee: Serafino

8 December 1974 9	Milan	0–0	Napoli	Milan
		Report		Stadium: Stadio San Siro; Attendance: 65,980; Referee: Barbaresco

15 December 1974 10	Cagliari	0–0	Milan	Cagliari
		Report		Stadium: Stadio Sant'Elia; Attendance: 23,276; Referee: R. Lattanzi

22 December 1974 11	Milan	3–0	Bologna	Milan
	Rivera 29'; Biasiolo 47'; Bigon 55'	Report		Stadium: Stadio San Siro; Attendance: 41,106; Referee: Gonella

5 January 1975 12	Cesena	1–0	Milan	Cesena
	Zuccheri 69'	Report		Stadium: Stadio La Fiorita; Attendance: 21,896; Referee: Picasso

12 January 1975 13	Milan	4–0	Varese	Milan
	Rivera 5'; Benetti 13', 52'; Bigon 37'	Report		Stadium: Stadio San Siro; Attendance: 32,143; Referee: Levrero

19 January 1975 14	Lazio	3–0	Milan	Rome
	Martini 56'; Turone 63' (o.g.); Chinaglia 75'	Report		Stadium: Stadio Olimpico; Attendance: 55,888; Referee: Panzino

26 January 1975 15	Milan	3–1	Ternana	Milan
	Bigon 6'; Calloni 50', 53'	Report	4' Petrini	Stadium: Stadio San Siro; Attendance: 35,689; Referee: Benedetti

2 February 1975 16	Sampdoria	2–4	Milan	Genoa
	Maraschi 6'; Fossati 31' (pen.)	Report	13' Rivera; 24' (pen.) Calloni; 42' Gorin; 89' (pen.) Chiarugi	Stadium: Stadio Luigi Ferraris; Attendance: 32,917; Referee: Michelotti

9 February 1975 17	Milan	0–2	Juventus	Milan
		Report		Stadium: Stadio San Siro; Attendance: 79,776; Referee: Barbaresco

16 February 1975 18	Fiorentina	1–1	Milan	Florence
	Casarsa 32' (pen.)	Report	16' Calloni	Stadium: Stadio Comunale; Attendance: 32,278; Referee: R. Lattanzi

23 February 1975 19	Milan	1–1	Roma	Verona
	Batistoni 34' (o.g.)	Report	35' Prati	Stadium: Stadio Marcantonio Bentegodi; Attendance: 46,169; Referee: Agnolin

2 March 1975 20	Lanerossi Vicenza	2–0	Milan	Vicenza
	Vitali 44', 89' (pen.)	Report		Stadium: Stadio Romeo Menti; Attendance: 21,149; Referee: Reggiani

9 March 1975 21	Milan	3–0	Inter Milan	Milan
	Calloni 5'; Benetti 39'; Facchetti 70' (o.g.)	Report		Stadium: Stadio San Siro; Attendance: 59,001; Referee: Serafino

16 March 1975 22	Ascoli	1–1	Milan	Ascoli Piceno
	Silva 78'	Report	58' (pen.) Calloni	Stadium: Stadio Cino e Lillo Del Duca; Attendance: 26,439; Referee: Ciacci

23 March 1975 23	Milan	2–0	Torino	Milan
	Gorin 7'; Agroppi 37' (o.g.)	Report		Stadium: Stadio San Siro; Attendance: 42,139; Referee: Levrero

30 March 1975 24	Napoli	2–0	Milan	Naples
	Clerici 71' (pen.); Turone 77' (o.g.)	Report		Stadium: Stadio San Paolo; Attendance: 62,609; Referee: Serafino

6 April 1975 25	Milan	0–0	Cagliari	Mantova
		Report		Stadium: Stadio Danilo Martelli; Attendance: 29,353; Referee: Trono

13 April 1975 26	Bologna	0–0	Milan	Bologna
		Report		Stadium: Stadio Comunale; Attendance: 38,508; Referee: Panzino

27 April 1975 27	Milan	3–0	Cesena	Milan
	Benetti 8'; Sabadini 48'; Chiarugi 89'	Report		Stadium: Stadio San Siro; Attendance: 34,508; Referee: Ciulli

4 May 1975 28	Varese	0–1	Milan	Varese
		Report	35' Chiarugi	Stadium: Stadio Franco Ossola; Attendance: 7,535; Referee: Terpin

11 May 1975 29	Milan	1–1	Lazio	Milan
	Calloni 26'	Report	31' Garlaschelli	Stadium: Stadio San Siro; Attendance: 28,905; Referee: Michelotti

18 May 1975 30	Ternana	1–3	Milan	Terni
	Benatti 34' (pen.)	Report	59', 60', 73' Calloni	Stadium: Stadio Libero Liberati; Attendance: 12,111; Referee: Gonella

=== Coppa Italia ===
==== First round ====
1 September 1974 1	Milan	0–0	Brescia	Milan
				Stadium: Stadio San Siro; Attendance: 30,000; Referee: Gialluisi

8 September 1974 2	Perugia	0–2	Milan	Perugia
			9', 14' Calloni	Stadium: Stadio Santa Giuliana; Attendance: 13,212; Referee: Serafino

15 September 1974 3	Milan	4–1	Parma	Milan
	Bigon 53'; Benetti 62'; Calloni 71'; Chiarugi 85'		55' Beccaria	Stadium: Stadio San Siro; Attendance: 20,000; Referee: Levrero

22 September 1974 4	Cesena	1–1	Milan	Cesena
	Festa 68'		81' Sabadini	Stadium: Stadio La Fiorita; Attendance: 18,000; Referee: Panzino

==== Second round ====
25 May 1975 1	Inter Milan	0–1	Milan	Milan
			81' Sabadini	Stadium: Stadio San Siro; Attendance: 28,735; Referee: Panzino

29 May 1975 2	Milan	1–0	Bologna	Milan
	Calloni 55'			Stadium: Stadio San Siro; Attendance: 12,000; Referee: Ciacci

12 June 1975 3	Milan	1–0	Juventus	Milan
	Bigon 76'			Stadium: Stadio San Siro; Attendance: 22,565; Referee: Serafino

15 June 1975 4	Milan	0–0	Inter Milan	Milan
				Stadium: Stadio San Siro; Attendance: 35,130; Referee: Agnolin

19 June 1975 5	Bologna	1–4	Milan	Bologna
	Massimelli 33'		35', 71' Calloni; 58' Biasiolo; 80' Chiarugi	Stadium: Stadio Comunale; Attendance: 10,000; Referee: Ciulli

22 June 1975 6	Juventus	2–1	Milan	Turin
	Scirea 12'; Damiani 35'		60' Sartori	Stadium: Stadio Comunale; Attendance: 5,000; Referee: Barboni

==== Final ====
28 June 1975	Fiorentina	3–2	Milan	Rome
	Casarsa 14' (pen.); Guerini 54'; Paolo Rosi 67'		20' Bigon; 65' Chiarugi	Stadium: Stadio Olimpico; Attendance: 24,392; Referee: Michelotti

== Statistics ==
=== Squad statistics ===
Competition	Points	Home						Away						Total						GD
Competition	Points	G	W	D	L	Gs	Ga	G	W	D	L	Gs	Ga	G	W	D	L	Gs	Ga	GD
1974-75 Serie A	36	15	8	6	1	24	6	15	4	6	5	13	16	30	12	12	6	37	22	15
1974-75 Coppa Italia	–	5	3	2	0	6	1	5	3	1	1	9	4	11	6	3	2	17	8	+9
Total	–	20	11	8	1	30	7	20	7	7	6	22	20	41	18	15	8	54	30	+24

=== Players statistics ===
No.	Pos	Nat	Player	Total		Serie A		Coppa Italia	
No.	Pos	Nat	Player	Apps	Goals	Apps	Goals	Apps	Goals
	DF	(Italy) ITA	Angelo Anquilletti	16	0	11	0	5	0
	DF	(Italy) ITA	Aldo Bet	37	0	29	0	8	0
	GK	(Italy) ITA	Enrico Albertosi	40	-28	30	-22	10	-6
	DF	(Italy) ITA	Giuseppe Sabadini	36	4	29	2	7	2
	GK	(Italy) ITA	Pier Luigi Pizzaballa	0	0	0	-0	0	-0
	MF	(Italy) ITA	Giorgio Biasiolo	22	2	13	1	9	1
	MF	(Italy) ITA	Duino Gorin	31	2	22	2	9	0
	MF	(Italy) ITA	Giovanni Lorini	12	0	8	0	4	0
	DF	(Italy) ITA	Luciano Zecchini	37	0	26	0	11	0
	FW	(Italy) ITA	Alberto Bigon	35	6	26	3	9	3
	DF	(Italy) ITA	Romeo Benetti	39	6	28	5	11	1
	DF	(Italy) ITA	Roberto Casone	0	0	0	0	0	0
	DF	(Italy) ITA	Filippo Citterio	5	0	1	0	4	0
	DF	(Italy) ITA	Riccardo Martelli	0	0	0	0	0	0
	MF	(Italy) ITA	Gianni Rivera	31	3	27	3	4	0
	DF	(Italy) ITA	Maurizio Turone	38	0	29	0	9	0
	FW	(Italy) ITA	Luciano Chiarugi	36	10	26	7	10	3
	DF	(Italy) ITA	Vinicio Pasin	0	0	0	0	0	0
	DF	(Italy) ITA	Aldo Maldera	24	0	13	0	11	0
	FW	(Italy) ITA	Gianni Bui	6	0	2	0	4	0
	FW	(Italy) ITA	Egidio Calloni	36	17	26	11	10	6
	FW	(Italy) ITA	Giovanni Sartori	1	1	0	0	1	1
	FW	(Italy) ITA	Giorgio Skoglund	1	0	1	0	0	0
	GK	(Italy) ITA	Franco Tancredi	1	-2	0	-0	1	-2

== See also ==
- AC Milan

== Bibliography ==
- Almanacco illustrato del Milan, ed: 2, March 2005. Panini.
- Enrico Tosi. La storia del Milan, May 2005. Italia/Italy cid Tosi.
- Milan. Sempre con te, December 2009. Mondadori. 2009. ISBN 978-88-04-59118-4.
