= 1975 Coppa Italia final =

27th Coppa Italia final
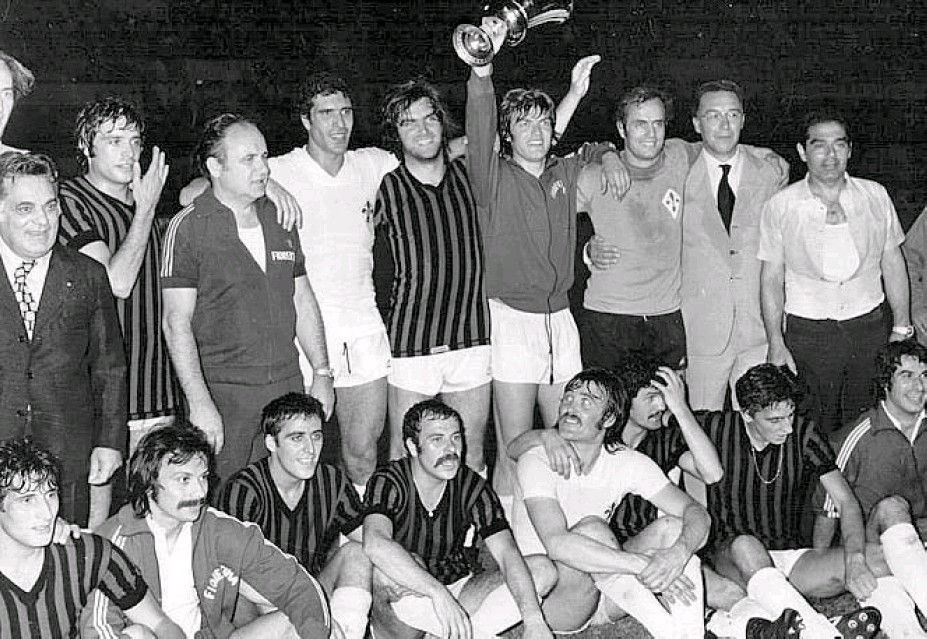
- Fiorentina squad celebrates; midfielder Giancarlo Antognoni raises the trophy.
- Event: 1974–75 Coppa Italia
Fiorentina	Milan
3	2
- Date: 28 June 1975
- Venue: Stadio Olimpico, Rome
- Referee: Alberto Michelotti
- Attendance: 40,000

The 1975 Coppa Italia final was the final of the 1974–75 Coppa Italia. The match was played on 28 June 1975 between Fiorentina and Milan. Fiorentina won 3–2. It was Fiorentina's sixth final and fourth victory.

== Match ==
28 June 1975
20:30

Fiorentina	3–2	Milan
Casarsa 14' (pen.); Guerini 54'; Rosi 67'		Bigon 20'; Chiarugi 65'

Stadio Olimpico, Rome
Attendance: 40,000
Referee: Alberto Michelotti

Fiorentina	Milan

GK	1	(Italy) Franco Superchi (c)
DF	2	(Italy) Ennio Pellegrini
DF	3	(Italy) Mauro Della Martira
DF	4	(Italy) Moreno Roggi
RW	5	(Italy) Claudio Merlo
MF	6	(Italy) Vincenzo Guerini
MF	7	(Italy) Domenico Caso
MF	8	(Italy) Bruno Beatrice	(substituted off) 46'
LW	9	(Italy) Giancarlo Antognoni
FW	10	(Italy) Claudio Desolati
FW	11	(Italy) Gianfranco Casarsa
Substitutes:
LW		(Italy) Giuseppe Lelj	(substituted in) 46'	(substituted off) 47'
FW		(Italy) Paolo Rosi	(substituted in) 47'
Manager:
(Italy) Mario Mazzoni

GK	1	(Italy) Enrico Albertosi
DF	2	(Italy) Giuseppe Sabadini	(substituted off) 60'
DF	3	(Italy) Aldo Bet
DF	4	(Italy) Luciano Zecchini
DF	5	(Italy) Maurizio Turone	(red card) 85'
DF	6	(Italy) Aldo Maldera
AM	7	(Italy) Alberto Bigon
MF	8	(Italy) Romeo Benetti (c)
FW	9	(Italy) Duino Gorin
FW	10	(Italy) Luciano Chiarugi
FW	11	(Italy) Egidio Calloni
Substitutes:
MF		(Italy) Giorgio Biasiolo	(substituted in) 60'
Manager:
(Italy) Gustavo Giagnoni

== See also ==
- 1974–75 AC Milan season
