= 1979–80 Ascoli Calcio 1898 season =

Ascoli Calcio 1898
1979–80 season
- Manager: Giovan Battista Fabbri
- Serie A: 5th
- Coppa Italia: 1st round
- Top goalscorer: Gianfranco Belloto (9)

The 1979–80 season was Ascoli Calcio 1898''s 'second consecutive season in Serie A, the top league of Italian football. This article covers the events from 16 September 1979 to 11 May 1980. They finished in 5th, their best ever finish in Serie A in their history.

== Squad ==
=== Goalkeepers ===
- (Italy) Luigi Muraro
- (Italy) Happy Pulici

=== Defenders ===
- (Italy) Donato Anzivino
- (Italy) Simone Boldini
- (Italy) Angiolino Gasparini
- (Italy) Eugenio Perico
- (Italy) Francesco Last

=== Midfielders ===
- (Italy) Gian Franco Bellotto
- (Italy) Giuliano Castoldi
- (Italy) Adelio Moro
- (Italy) Silvio Paolucci
- (Italy) Alessandro Scanziani
- (Italy) Fortunato Torrisi
- (Italy) Carlo Trevisanello

=== Attackers ===
- (Italy) Pietro Anastasi
- (Italy) Maurizio Iorio
- (Italy) Hubert Pircher

== Serie A ==
Pos	Team	Pld	W	D	L	GF	GA	GD	Pts	Qualification or relegation
2	Juventus	30	16	6	8	42	25	+17	38	Qualification to UEFA Cup
3	Torino (Note: A.C. Milan and S.S. Lazio placed in the last position and relegated to Serie B by FIGC because of the Totonero 1980 scandal. Torino qualified to UEFA Cup instead of Milan.)	30	11	13	6	26	15	+11	35	Qualification to UEFA Cup
4	Ascoli	30	11	12	7	35	28	+7	34	
5	Fiorentina	30	11	11	8	33	27	+6	33	
6	Roma	30	10	12	8	34	35	−1	32	Qualification to Cup Winners' Cup

Source: RSSSF.com
Rules for classification: 1) Points; 2) Head-to-head points; 3) Head-to-head goal difference; 4) Goal difference; 5) Goals scored; 6) Draw. (Note: Head-to-head record is used only after all the matches between the teams in question have been played).
Goal difference is used in case of equal points.
Notes:

16 September 1979 1	Ascoli	0–0	Napoli

23 September 1979 2	Torino	1–0	Ascoli

30 September 1979 3	Ascoli	2–2	Catanzaro
	Iorio 6'; Moro 16'

7 October 1979 4	Pescara	0–0	Ascoli

14 October 1979 5	Ascoli	1–1	Lazio
	Bellotto 9'

21 October 1979 6	Milan	3–0	Ascoli

28 October 1979 7	Ascoli	2–0	Bologna
	Bellotto 49'; Marchini 70'

== Sources ==
- RSSSF - Italy Championship 1979/80
