= Calcioscommesse =

Calcioscommesse (Italian: "soccer bet") may refer to:

- Totonero 1980, a scandal of association football matchfixing in Italy in 1980
- Totonero 1986, a scandal of association football matchfixing in Italy between 1984 and 1986
- The 2011–12 Italian football scandal
- The 2015 Italian football scandal

== See also ==
- Totonero, the 1980s scandals
- Calciopoli, the 2006 Italian matchfixing scandal
