= Fabio Cordella =

Italian sports director

- Full name: Fabio Cordella
- Born: Italy
Years		Role
2006		Sports Director at Africa Sports d'Abidjan
2008		Manager of Lanciano
2008		Sports director of A.C.D. Treviso
2011		Sporting director of Budapest Honvéd FC

Fabio Cordella (born 16 March 1975) is an Italian sports director and businessman. He was the sporting director of Budapest Honved FC, Royale Union Saint-Gilloise, Treviso FC, Virtus Lanciano, Africa Sports d'Abidjan, Klubi Sportiv Kamza and Club de Regatas Vasco da Gama respectively. He is also the founder of Fabio Cordella Cantine.

== Career ==
=== Playing career ===
Cordella started his professional playing career from Pro Italia Galatina and afterwards he moved to Reggiana Calcio. He also played for one season at Palazzolo sull’ Oglio and in the Italian national championship, managed by Aldo Bet.

=== Managerial career ===
Fabio Cordella began his career as a manager in early 2006. He was offered the role of Sports Director for an Ivory Coast professional team Africa Sports d'Abidjan. Francesco Moriero was the coach of the team as at the time of his appointment. In 2006 they won the championship after 18 years. In 2007 they played in CAF Champions League and won another time the Ivory Coast championship for the club. After his two years contract with the team expired, Cordella move to Italy where he was offered the role of Manager at Lanciano and served in the club as general manager till 2008.

In June 2008, he became the sports director of Treviso Calcio where he worked for only two months before moving to another club for personal reasons. Subsequently, after he left Treviso Calcio, he was hired at Royale Union Saint-Gilloise, a Belgium football club as general manager and advisor. In 2010, he terminated his contract with Royale Union Saint-Gilloise for personal reasons.

In 2011, Cordella was appointed the sporting director of Budapest Honved FC. He had signed a five years contract with the team which expired in 2016.
