= Braglia =

Braglia is an Italian surname. Notable people with the surname include:

- Alberto Braglia (1883–1954), Italian gymnast
- Giorgio Braglia (born 1947), Italian footballer
- Piero Braglia (born 1955), Italian footballer and manager

== See also ==
- Stadio Alberto Braglia, football stadium in Modena, Italy
