= Chinellato =

Chinellato is an Italian surname. Notable people with the surname include:

- Giacomo Chinellato (born 1955), Italian footballer
- Matteo Chinellato (born 1991), Italian footballer
