= Totonero =

Totonero may refer to:

- Totonero 1980, a scandal of football match fixing in Italy in 1980
- Totonero 1986, a scandal of football match fixing in Italy between 1984 and 1986
