= Turone's goal =

Turone's goal (Italian: Il gol di Turone) has been for decades one of the most debated events in the history of Italian football. It refers to the disallowing of a goal scored by Roma versus Juventus in a crucial match for the 1980–81 Serie A championship. It occurred during one of the last matches of the league season when the two teams were, along with Napoli, fighting for the title.

== Facts ==
The event occurred in Turin on 10 May 1981 during the match between Juventus and Roma. At the time, Juventus were topping the Serie A by one point over second-placed Roma; after that match there would have been just two games each to play.

The match turned out to be a tight game, with many fouls and hard tackles from both sides. In the second half Juventus's midfielder Giuseppe Furino was shown a red card for persistent fouling and sent off. The match still remained tight until 10 minutes before the end when, following a move by Roma started by Carlo Ancelotti, the sweeper Maurizio Turone headed goalwards a ball played to him by the forward Roberto Pruzzo. The goalkeeper, Dino Zoff, could not save it and it seemed the away team had achieved the 1-0 scoreline that they needed. However, the linesman signaled to the referee, Paolo Bergamo, that Turone was offside and the goal was disallowed; the match eventually ended 0-0.

With two games left each of the season, the title was essentially still to play for. Juventus won their next two games: a tough 1-0 victory against Napoli at the notorious Stadio San Paolo, and a 1-0 victory against Fiorentina. Although Roma beat Pistoiese, they could only manage a draw with Avellino on the final day of the season. So Juventus won its 19th Italian League title by two points (44 vs 42). The disallowed goal gave rise to a huge controversy that endures in anti-Juventus circles - such as in the strong rivalry with Roma.

The TV images never clarified, in a definitive way, if the player's position was irregular or not. In the following years, conflicting opinions, projections with new technologies and alleged manipulation of slow motion continued to come in succession; in any case, from then on, the so-called "Turone's goal" remained a hot topic in Italian football for decades to come.
