= 1976–77 Coppa Italia =

Tournament details
- Country: Italy
- Dates: 29 Aug 1976 – 3 July 1977
- Teams: 36

Final positions
- Champions: Milan (4th title)
- Runners-up: Internazionale

Tournament statistics
- Matches played: 95
- Goals scored: 221 (2.33 per match)
- Top goal scorer(s): Giorgio Braglia; Egidio Calloni (6 goals)

The 1976–77 Coppa Italia was the 30th Coppa Italia, the major Italian domestic cup. The competition was won by Milan.

== First round ==
=== Group 1 ===
Pos	Team	Pld	W	D	L	GF	GA	GD	Pts
1	Milan	4	3	1	0	8	2	+6	7
2	Atalanta	4	3	1	0	7	2	+5	7
3	Lazio	4	2	0	2	8	7	+1	4
4	Catania	4	1	0	3	2	6	−4	2
5	Novara	4	0	0	4	2	10	−8	0

=== Group 2 ===
Pos	Team	Pld	W	D	L	GF	GA	GD	Pts
1	Juventus	4	2	2	0	7	1	+6	6
2	Genoa	4	2	2	0	6	2	+4	6
3	Hellas Verona	4	2	0	2	3	6	−3	4
4	Monza	4	0	3	1	3	4	−1	3
5	Sambenedettese	4	0	1	3	1	7	−6	1

=== Group 3 ===
Pos	Team	Pld	W	D	L	GF	GA	GD	Pts
1	Internazionale	4	3	1	0	7	2	+5	7
2	Fiorentina	4	2	2	0	7	4	+3	6
3	Palermo	4	0	3	1	2	3	−1	3
4	Varese	4	1	1	2	3	7	−4	3
5	Pescara	4	0	1	3	0	3	−3	1

=== Group 4 ===
Pos	Team	Pld	W	D	L	GF	GA	GD	Pts
1	SPAL	4	3	0	1	6	2	+4	6
2	Como	4	1	2	1	6	6	0	4
3	Cesena	4	1	2	1	3	4	−1	4
4	Ternana	4	1	1	2	4	5	−1	3
5	Catanzaro	4	1	1	2	4	6	−2	3

=== Group 5 ===
Pos	Team	Pld	W	D	L	GF	GA	GD	Pts
1	Lecce	4	3	1	0	5	2	+3	7
2	Torino	4	2	1	1	9	4	+5	5
3	Foggia	4	1	2	1	4	5	−1	4
4	Taranto	4	0	2	2	2	5	−3	2
5	Ascoli	4	0	2	2	1	5	−4	2

=== Group 6 ===
Pos	Team	Pld	W	D	L	GF	GA	GD	Pts
1	Bologna	4	3	1	0	9	3	+6	7
2	Roma	4	2	2	0	7	3	+4	6
3	Rimini	4	1	1	2	5	8	−3	3
4	Brescia	4	1	0	3	6	9	−3	2
5	Avellino	4	0	2	2	5	9	−4	2

=== Group 7 ===
Pos	Team	Pld	W	D	L	GF	GA	GD	Pts
1	Vicenza	4	4	0	0	6	1	+5	8
2	Perugia	4	2	1	1	5	2	+3	5
3	Cagliari	4	1	2	1	4	4	0	4
4	Modena	4	1	1	2	6	9	−3	3
5	Sampdoria	4	0	0	4	3	8	−5	0

== Second round ==
Join the defending champion: Napoli.

=== Group A ===
Pos	Team	Pld	W	D	L	GF	GA	GD	Pts
1	Milan	6	5	1	0	15	3	+12	11
2	Bologna	6	2	2	2	6	7	−1	6
3	Napoli	6	2	2	2	4	5	−1	6
4	SPAL	6	0	1	5	0	10	−10	1

=== Group B ===
Pos	Team	Pld	W	D	L	GF	GA	GD	Pts
1	Internazionale	6	3	3	0	7	2	+5	9
2	Juventus	6	2	2	2	8	7	+1	6
3	Vicenza	6	2	1	3	9	11	−2	5
4	Lecce	6	0	4	2	4	8	−4	4

== Final ==
3 July 1977
20:30

Milan	2–0	Internazionale
Maldera 64'; Braglia 89'

Stadio Giuseppe Meazza, Milan
Referee: Cesare Gussoni

== Top goalscorers ==
Rank	Player	Club	Goals
1	(Italy) Giorgio Braglia	Milan	6
1	(Italy) Egidio Calloni	Milan	6
3	(Italy) Roberto Pruzzo	Genoa	5
3	(Italy) Roberto Boninsegna	Juventus	5
5	(Italy) Alberto Bigon	Milan	4
5	(Italy) Gesualdo Albanese	Vicenza	4
5	(Italy) Roberto Bellinazzi	Modena	4
5	(Italy) Giovanni Carnevali	Rimini	4
5	(Italy) Franco Nanni	Bologna	4
5	(Italy) Gianfranco Casarsa	Fiorentina	4
