= Eugenio Perico =

Italian footballer (1951–2025)

Personal information
- Date of birth: 15 October 1951
- Place of birth: Curno, Italy
- Date of death: 17 December 2025 (aged 74)
- Place of death: Bergamo, Italy
- Height: 1.73 m (5 ft 8 in)
- Position: Left-back

Senior career*
| Years | Team | Apps | (Gls) |
| 1970–1971 | Atalanta | 0 | (0) |
| 1971–1972 | Spezia | 36 | (3) |
| 1972–1973 | Cremonese | 38 | (0) |
| 1973–1981 | Ascoli | 236 | (7) |
| 1981–1987 | Atalanta | 148 | (1) |
| Total | | 458 | (11) |

Managerial career
- 1998–2010: Atalanta U15
- * Club domestic league appearances and goals

Eugenio Perico (15 October 1951 – 17 December 2025) was an Italian football player and manager who played as a left-back.

Perico played for the likes of Atalanta, Spezia, and Ascoli before coaching the Atalanta under-15 team from 1998 to 2010.

Perico died in Bergamo on 17 December 2025, at the age of 74.
