= Viviano Guida =

Italian footballer

Personal information
- Date of birth: February 28, 1955 (age 71)
- Place of birth: Casorate Primo, Italy
- Height: 1.82 m (5 ft 11 1/2 in)
- Position: Defender

Senior career*
Years	Team	Apps	(Gls)
1974–1975	Internazionale	4	(0)
1975–1976	Varese	31	(1)
1976–1977	Internazionale	9	(0)
1977–1982	Brescia	128	(4)
1982–1983	Cavese	31	(0)
1983–1984	Monza	26	(0)
1984–1985	SPAL	28	(0)
1985–1987	Catanzaro	52	(0)
1987–1989	Ischia	51	(1)
1989–1991	Ercolanese		

Managerial career
- 1995–1997: Juve Stabia
- * Club domestic league appearances and goals

Viviano Guida (born February 28, 1955, in Casorate Primo) is an Italian former professional footballer.
