= Gianluca De Ponti =

Italian footballer

Personal information
- Date of birth: 14 July 1952 (age 74)
- Place of birth: Florence, Italy
- Height: 1.78 m (5 ft 10 in)
- Position: Striker

Youth career
- ACF Fiorentina

Senior career*
Years	Team	Apps	(Gls)
1970–1973	Impruneta	54	(44)
1973–1974	Terranuovese	28	(18)
1974–1975	Sangiovannese	32	(14)
1975–1977	Cesena	30	(9)
1977–1978	Bologna	25	(7)
1978–1980	Avellino	59	(15)
1980–1981	Sampdoria	29	(10)
1981–1982	Ascoli	29	(4)
1982–1984	Bologna	52	(6)
1985–1986	Żurrieq		(8)
- * Club domestic league appearances and goals

Gianluca De Ponti (born 14 July 1952) is an Italian former footballer who during his career played for Impruneta, Terranuovese, Sangiovannese, Cesena, Bologna, Avellino, Sampdoria, Ascoli and Żurrieq, throughout his career he played as a striker.
