= 1974–75 Serie A =

72nd season of top-tier Italian football

Serie A
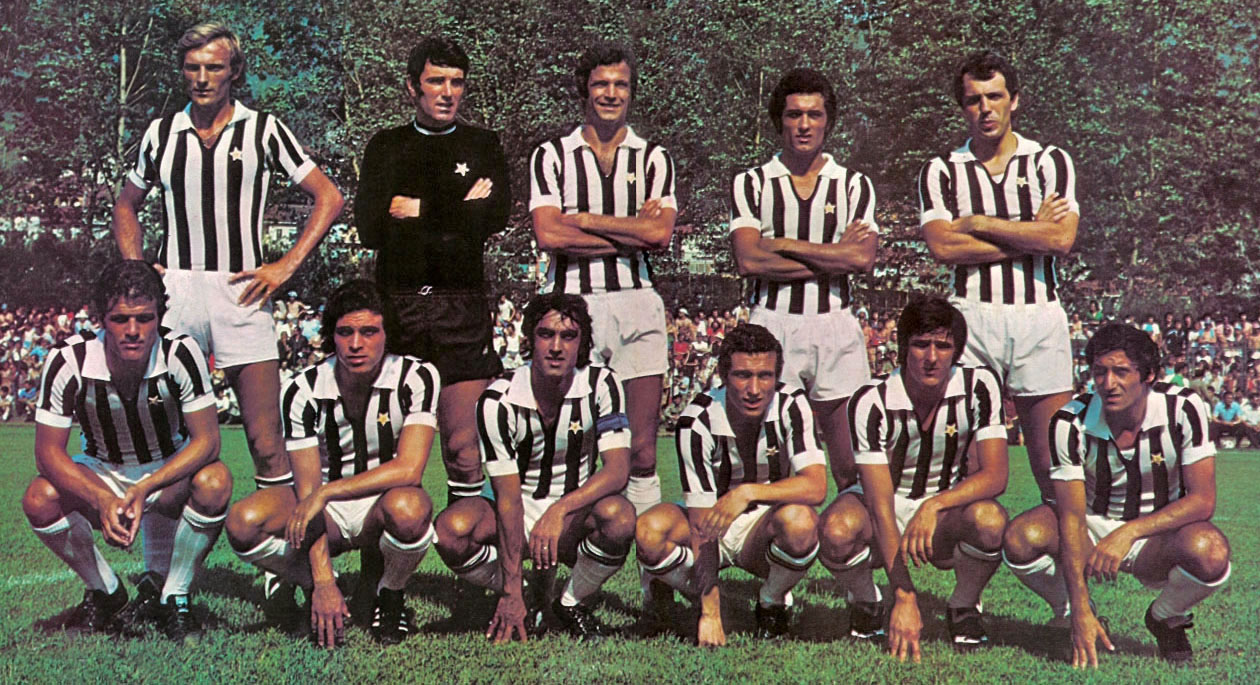
- 1974–75 Juventus' squad
- Season: 1974–75
- Dates: 6 October 1974 – 18 May 1975
- Champions: Juventus; 16th title
- Relegated: Vicenza; Ternana; Varese
- European Cup: Juventus
- Cup Winners' Cup: Fiorentina
- UEFA Cup: Napoli; Roma; Lazio; Milan
- Matches: 240
- Goals: 467 (1.95 per match)
- Top goalscorer: Paolo Pulici (18 goals)

Serie A 1974-75 team distribution

The 1974–75 Serie A season was won by Juventus.

== Teams ==
Varese, Ascoli and Ternana had been promoted from Serie B.

== Final classification ==
Pos	Team	Pld	W	D	L	GF	GA	GD	Pts	Qualification or relegation
1	Juventus (C)	30	18	7	5	49	19	+30	43	Qualification to European Cup
2	Napoli	30	14	13	3	50	22	+28	41	Qualification to UEFA Cup
3	Roma	30	15	9	6	27	15	+12	39	Qualification to UEFA Cup
4	Lazio	30	14	9	7	34	28	+6	37	Qualification to UEFA Cup
5	Milan	30	12	12	6	37	22	+15	36	Qualification to UEFA Cup
6	Torino	30	11	13	6	40	30	+10	35	
7	Bologna	30	10	12	8	36	33	+3	32	
8	Fiorentina	30	9	13	8	31	27	+4	31	Qualification to Cup Winners' Cup
9	Internazionale	30	10	10	10	26	26	0	30	
10	Cagliari	30	6	14	10	22	30	−8	26	
11	Cesena	30	5	15	10	23	35	−12	25	
12	Ascoli	30	6	12	12	14	27	−13	24	
13	Sampdoria	30	4	16	10	21	35	−14	24	
14	Vicenza (R)	30	5	11	14	19	34	−15	21	Relegation to Serie B
15	Ternana (R)	30	4	11	15	19	42	−23	19	Relegation to Serie B
16	Varese (R)	30	3	11	16	19	42	−23	17	Relegation to Serie B

Source: Panini
(C) Champions; (R) Relegated

== Results ==
Home \ Away	ASC	BOL	CAG	CES	FIO	INT	JUV	LRV	LAZ	MIL	NAP	ROM	SAM	TER	TOR	VAR
Ascoli		1–3	0–0	0–0	0–1	0–0	0–0	1–0	1–0	1–1	1–1	0–0	1–0	1–0	1–1	2–0
Bologna	1–1		2–0	3–2	1–0	2–1	2–1	1–1	1–2	0–0	1–0	1–0	2–2	1–1	1–3	1–1
Cagliari	2–0	1–1		2–2	2–1	0–1	1–1	0–0	1–1	0–0	1–1	1–2	1–0	2–0	0–0	1–1
Cesena	0–0	2–2	2–1		1–1	0–0	0–1	3–1	0–0	1–0	0–0	0–0	1–1	2–1	1–1	1–1
Fiorentina	0–0	1–0	2–1	2–2		1–1	4–1	0–0	1–1	1–1	1–1	0–0	0–2	2–0	2–2	2–0
Internazionale	0–1	1–1	4–1	0–1	1–0		0–1	0–0	3–1	0–0	0–0	0–2	0–0	1–0	1–0	1–0
Juventus	4–0	0–0	1–0	1–0	0–0	1–0		5–0	4–0	2–1	2–1	1–0	1–1	2–0	0–0	3–0
Vicenza	1–0	0–1	0–0	2–0	0–1	1–3	1–2		1–2	2–0	2–2	0–2	1–1	1–0	1–0	1–1
Lazio	1–0	1–0	1–0	2–1	1–0	1–2	1–0	1–0		3–0	1–1	0–1	3–0	0–0	1–5	2–0
Milan	2–0	3–0	0–0	3–0	1–1	3–0	0–2	1–0	1–1		0–0	1–1	0–0	3–1	2–0	4–0
Napoli	3–1	1–0	5–0	4–0	1–0	3–2	2–6	2–0	1–1	2–0		2–0	2–0	7–1	1–0	3–0
Roma	1–0	2–1	1–1	2–0	1–0	1–0	1–0	1–0	1–0	0–1	0–0		1–0	4–2	0–1	1–0
Sampdoria	0–0	1–0	0–0	0–0	3–4	1–1	1–3	1–1	0–2	2–4	1–1	0–0		1–0	0–0	1–0
Ternana	1–0	0–0	0–2	1–0	0–1	0–0	0–2	0–0	1–1	1–3	0–0	2–2	1–1		2–1	2–0
Torino	1–0	3–3	1–0	2–0	2–1	2–3	3–2	2–1	2–2	1–1	1–1	1–0	1–1	1–1		3–1
Varese	3–1	1–4	0–1	1–1	1–1	2–0	0–0	1–1	0–1	0–1	0–2	0–0	4–0	1–1	0–0	

Source: Almanacco Illustrato del Calcio - La Storia 1898-2004, Panini Edizioni, Modena, September 2005 (in Italian)
Legend: Blue = home team win; Yellow = draw; Red = away team win.

== Top goalscorers ==
Rank	Player	Club	Goals
1	(Italy) Paolo Pulici	Torino	18
2	(Italy) Giuseppe Savoldi	Bologna	15
3	(Italy) Giorgio Chinaglia	Lazio	14
3	(Italy) Pierino Prati	Roma	14
3	(Brazil) Sergio Clerici	Napoli	14
6	(Italy) Francesco Graziani	Torino	12
6	(Italy) Giorgio Braglia	Napoli	12
8	(Italy) Egidio Calloni	Milan	11
9	(Italy) Sergio Gori	Cagliari	10
10	(Italy) Oscar Damiani	Juventus	9
10	(Italy) Pietro Anastasi	Juventus	9
10	(Italy) Roberto Boninsegna	Internazionale	9
10	(Italy) Giuseppe Massa	Napoli	9
14	(Brazil) (Italy) José Altafini	Juventus	8

== Attendances ==
No.	Club	Average Attendance	Change (%)
1	SSC Napoli	67,678	8.0%
2	AS Roma	53,935	13.3%
3	SS Lazio	44,846	-10.0%
4	AC Milan	44,796	-5.6%
5	Juventus FC	41,820	-4.8%
6	Internazionale	36,283	-26.8%
7	ACF Fiorentina	31,280	-11.5%
8	Torino FC	30,311	-12.3%
9	Bologna FC	28,673	-4.6%
10	Cagliari Calcio	21,289	-13.6%
11	Ascoli Picchio	18,895	110.8%
12	UC Sampdoria	18,724	-21.4%
13	Ternana Calcio	18,530	29.3%
14	AC Cesena	17,144	-19.1%
15	Vicenza Calcio	15,470	-7.8%
16	AS Varese 1910	10,451	73.3%

== References and sources ==
- Almanacco Illustrato del Calcio - La Storia 1898-2004, Panini Edizioni, Modena, September 2005
