= Michele De Nadai =

Italian footballer

Personal information
- Date of birth: 8 September 1954 (age 72)
- Place of birth: Milan, Italy
- Height: 1.80 m (5 ft 11 in)
- Positions: Defender; midfielder

Senior career*
Years	Team	Apps	(Gls)
1972–1973	Milan	0	(0)
1973–1975	Lecco	69	(6)
1975–1976	Milan	1	(1)
1976–1977	Monza	30	(1)
1977–1981	Roma	82	(3)
1981–1983	Lazio	48	(5)
1983–1984	Pistoiese	25	(2)
1984–1986	Salernitana	51	(0)
- * Club domestic league appearances and goals

Michele De Nadai (born 8 September 1954 in Milan) is a retired Italian professional footballer who played as a defender or midfielder.

He played for five seasons (83 games, 4 goals) in the Italian Serie A for A.C. Milan and A.S. Roma.

He scored a goal in the only game he played for A.C. Milan, a 2–1 win over A.C. Cesena on 2 May 1976.

De Nadai also played for Lazio.
