= Giuseppe Massa =

Italian footballer

Personal information
- Date of birth: 26 April 1948
- Place of birth: Naples, Italy
- Date of death: 17 October 2017 (aged 69)
- Place of death: Naples
- Height: 1.68 m (5 ft 6 in)
- Positions: Striker; right winger

Youth career
- Flegrea

Senior career*
Years	Team	Apps	(Gls)
1965–1966	Internapoli	25	(4)
1966–1972	Lazio	137	(31)
1972–1974	Internazionale	43	(4)
1974–1978	Napoli	102	(24)
1978–1981	Avellino	65	(10)
1982–1984	Campania	45	(3)
- * Club domestic league appearances and goals

Giuseppe Massa (26 April 1948 in Naples – 17 October 2017 in Naples) was an Italian professional footballer who played as a forward or midfielder.

== Playing career ==
Massa began his youth career with Flegrea, before joining local side Internapoli in 1965, whose home stadium was the Stadio Arturo Collana in the Vomero region of Naples. His performances caught the attention of Lazio, and he subsequently joined the club in 1966, remaining with the team until 1972, scoring 31 goals in 137 appearances and forming a notable offensive partnership with striker Giorgio Chinaglia, playing in a creative role; together, they helped the club obtain promotion to Serie A during the 1971–72 season, while Chinaglia finished the season as the league's top-scorer, largely thanks to Massa's assists.

His performances caught the attention of larger clubs, and he subsequently joined Inter, where he remained for two seasons, but failed to impress, and later joined Napoli ahead of the 1974–75 Serie A season. Under manager Luis Vinicio, he won a Coppa Italia with the club in 1976, and also reached the semi-finals of the European Cup Winners' Cup the following season. He left Napoli in 1978, to join Avellino, where he remained until 1981, before joining Campania in 1982, where he ultimately ended his career in 1984.

== Style of play ==
A mobile and diminutive winger, Massa was a traditional number 7, who was known in particular for his speed, technique, dribbling skills, and eye for goal, as well as his ability to create goalscoring opportunities for his teammates.

== Managerial career ==
As a manager, Massa worked as a coach in the Napoli youth system.

== Personal life ==
Giuseppe Massa's daughter, Azzurra, is also a footballer, who currently plays for Carpisa Yamamy. His son, Maurizio, died in 2004 from a rare blood disease.

== Death ==
Massa died on 17 October 2017, at the age of 69.

== Honours ==
Lazio

- Serie B: 1968–69.
- Coppa delle Alpi winner: 1971.

Napoli

- Coppa Italia winner: 1975–76.
- Anglo-Italian League Cup winner: 1976.
