= Massimo Silva =

Italian footballer and manager

Personal information
- Date of birth: 24 August 1951 (age 75)
- Place of birth: Pinarolo Po, Italy
- Height: 1.75 m (5 ft 9 in)
- Position: Striker

Team information
- Current team: Vastese (head coach)

Youth career
- Internazionale

Senior career*
| Years | Team | Apps | (Gls) |
| 1968–1971 | Internazionale | 0 | (0) |
| 1969–1970 | → Monza (loan) | 0 | (0) |
| 1970–1971 | → Rovereto (loan) | 23 | (7) |
| 1971–1972 | Cremonese | 22 | (9) |
| 1972 | Lazio | 0 | (0) |
| 1972–1976 | Ascoli | 108 | (23) |
| 1976–1977 | Milan | 20 | (4) |
| 1977–1979 | Monza | 70 | (30) |
| 1979–1982 | Pescara | 87 | (19) |
| 1982–1983 | Sambenedettese | 23 | (4) |
| 1983–1984 | Messina | 20 | (1) |
| 1984–1986 | Monopoli | 40 | (5) |

Managerial career
- 1988–1989: Comunanza
- 1989–1990: Martinsicuro
- 1990–1991: Grottazzolina
- 1991–1994: Maceratese
- 1994–1996: Ternana
- 1996–1998: Benevento
- 1998–1999: Sambenedettese
- 2001: Taranto
- 2001–2002: Sant'Anastasia
- 2002–2003: Frosinone
- 2003–2004: Cavese
- 2004–2006: Ascoli
- 2007–2009: Brindisi
- 2010: Casarano
- 2011–2013: Ascoli
- 2013: Ascoli
- 2014: Grosseto
- 2015: Grosseto
- 2017: Campobasso
- 2018–2019: Isernia
- 2020: Vastese
- 2020: Vastese
- 2022: Grosseto
- * Club domestic league appearances and goals

Massimo Silva (born 24 August 1951) is an Italian professional football coach and a former player.

== Career ==
=== Player ===
He has played four seasons (90 games, 16 goals) in the Serie A for Ascoli Calcio 1898, A.C. Milan and Delfino Pescara 1936. He scored the goal in the first round of the 1976–77 UEFA Cup that put A.C. Milan past FC Dinamo București.

=== Coach ===
As a coach, he mostly managed lower-level teams, except for two seasons with Ascoli Calcio 1898, including one in the Serie A as the formal head coach tutoring for actual manager Marco Giampaolo, who did not possess the UEFA Pro coaching licence at the time.

On November 2, 2011, he was appointed head coach of Serie B club Ascoli Calcio 1898. He was sacked on 20 March 2013 and replaced by Rosario Pergolizzi, but on 13 April 2013 he was reinstated as manager.

In 2014, he took over at Lega Pro club Grosseto, serving on two stints during the 2014–15 season (August to November 2014, then March to June 2015). He then served at Serie D level for Campobasso (from February to June 2017) and Isernia (2018–19 season).

On 28 January 2020 he was named new head coach of Serie D club Vastese, replacing Marco Amelia. He left the club at the end of the 2019–20 season and then was hired again on 5 September 2020. He was fired by Vastese on 26 December 2020.

He successively worked as the head coach of Serie D club Grosseto from July to September 2022.
