= Antonio Rigamonti =

Italian footballer (born 1949)

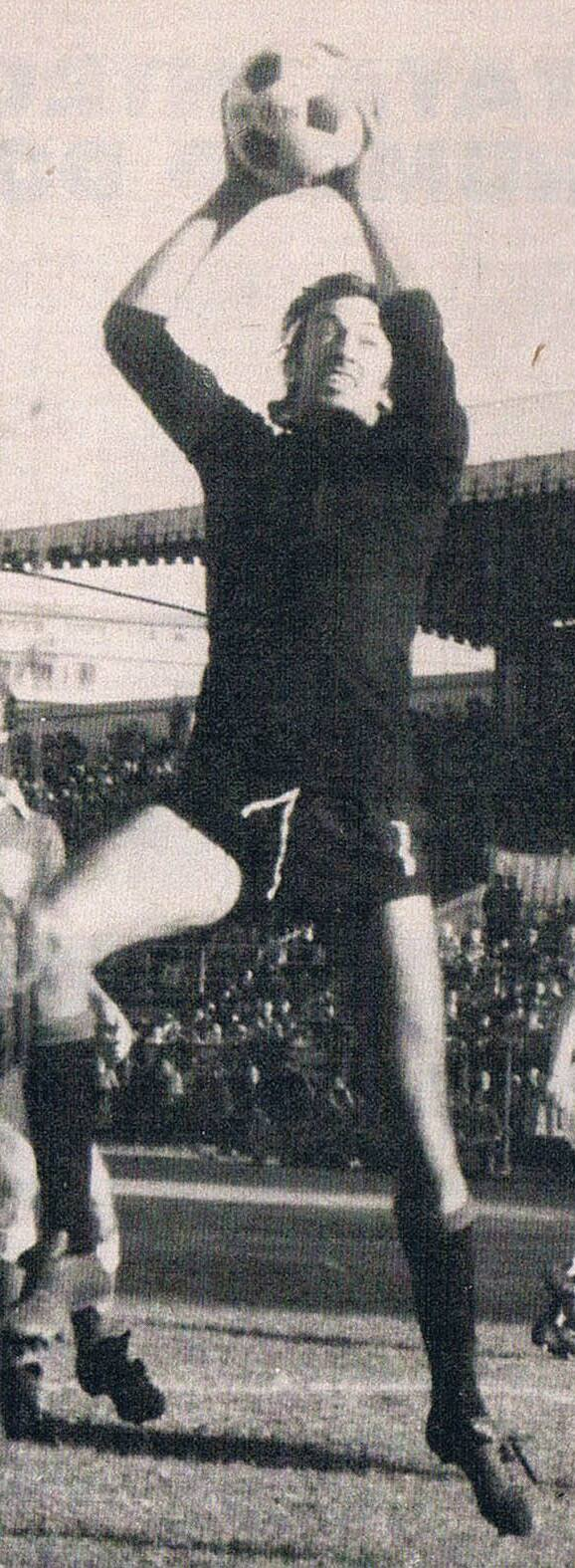

Personal information
- Date of birth: 5 April 1949 (age 77)
- Place of birth: Carate Brianza, Italy
- Height: 1.84 m (6 ft 1/2 in)
- Position: Goalkeeper

Senior career*
Years	Team	Apps	(Gls)
1967–1969	Lilion Snia Varedo	45	(0)
1969–1972	Atalanta	20	(0)
1972–1973	Cremonese	37	(0)
1973–1976	Como	106	(6)
1976–1980	Milan	12	(0)
1980–1981	Varese	10	(0)
1981–1982	Terranova	16	(0)
1982–1983	Messina	33	(0)
1983–1985	Cremonese	3	(0)
1985–1986	Akragas	3	(0)
Total		285	(6)
- * Club domestic league appearances and goals

Antonio Rigamonti (born 5 April 1949) is a retired Italian professional football player.

== Career ==
Born in Carate Brianza, Rigamonti began playing football with Atalanta. He made his Serie A debut against Internazionale on 3 October 1971. He played for 6 seasons (61 games, 3 goals) in the Serie A for Atalanta B.C., Calcio Como, A.C. Milan and U.S. Cremonese.

For most of his A.C. Milan career, he was the backup to Enrico Albertosi until Albertosi was disqualified in the Totonero 1980 betting scandal, and Rigamonti became the first-choice goalkeeper for the last 10 games with Milan.

In a rare case for a goalkeeper, he was a penalty-kick taker with Calcio Como, scoring 6 goals, including 3 in Serie A.

== Honours ==
- Serie A champion: 1978/79.
- Coppa Italia winner: 1976/77.
