= Cesare Gussoni =

Italian football referee (1934–2024)

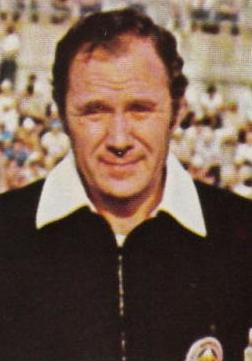
- Born: 20 January 1934; Casalmaggiore, Italy
- Died: 28 October 2024 (aged 90)

Domestic
Years	League	Role
1966–1978	Serie A	Referee

International
Years	League	Role
1977–1978	FIFA-listed	Referee

Cesare Gussoni (20 January 1934 – 28 October 2024) was an Italian football referee.

He served as referee 106 times in Serie A between 1966 and 1978. He also refereed the 1977 Coppa Italia Final.

At international level, he refereed twice in the 1978 FIFA World Cup qualifiers: in Greece–Soviet Union on 10 May 1977 and in Hong Kong–Iran on 19 June 1977. He also served as a linesman in the 1976 European Cup Final.

In 1978, Gussoni was awarded the Giovanni Mauro Award as the best referee of the season. In 2013, he was inducted into the Italian Football Hall of Fame.

== Honours ==
- Giovanni Mauro Award: 1978
- Italian Football Hall of Fame: 2013
