= Angiolino Gasparini =

Italian footballer (born 1951)

Personal information
- Date of birth: 22 March 1951 (age 75)
- Place of birth: Bedizzole, Italy
- Height: 1.75 m (5 ft 9 in)
- Position: Defender

Senior career*
Years	Team	Apps	(Gls)
1969–1974	Brescia	138	(0)
1974–1975	Verona	38	(0)
1975–1978	Internazionale	68	(0)
1978–1983	Ascoli	134	(1)
1983–1986	Monza	103	(0)
- * Club domestic league appearances and goals

Angiolino Gasparini (born 22 March 1951) is a retired Italian professional footballer who played as a defender.

== Honours ==
Inter

- Coppa Italia winner: 1977–78.
