= Adelio Moro =

Italian footballer and manager (born 1951)

Personal information
- Date of birth: 14 April 1951 (age 75)
- Place of birth: Mozzanica, Italy
- Position: Midfielder

Senior career*
Years	Team	Apps	(Gls)
1968–1972	Atalanta	52	(16)
1969–1970	→ Cremonese (loan)	20	(1)
1972–1975	Internazionale	61	(9)
1975–1976	Verona	22	(7)
1976–1981	Ascoli	153	(30)
1981–1982	Milan	19	(1)
1982–1983	Cesena	15	(2)
1983–1984	Atalanta	8	(0)
1984–1986	Ospitaletto	55	(9)

Managerial career
- 1991–1995: Brescia (assist.)
- 2001–2002: Vicenza
- * Club domestic league appearances and goals

Adelio Moro (born 14 April 1951) is an Italian professional football coach and a former player who played as a central midfielder.

== Playing career ==
Moro began his career at Atalanta and came to prominence after their return to Serie A in 1971. He became known as a skilful midfielder with an eye for goal, and joined Inter Milan the following year. A season at Verona followed, before a move to Ascoli in 1977.

At Ascoli, he formed a formidable midfield partnership with Gianfranco Bellotto and Alessandro Scanziani between 1979 and 1981, scoring a large proportion of the team's goals over those two seasons, and leading the side to their highest-ever finish in the league, a fifth place in 1980. Spells at Milan and Cesena followed before a brief return to Atalanta.

== Honours ==
Milan

- Mitropa Cup winner: 1982.
