= Giorgio Morini =

Italian footballer and manager

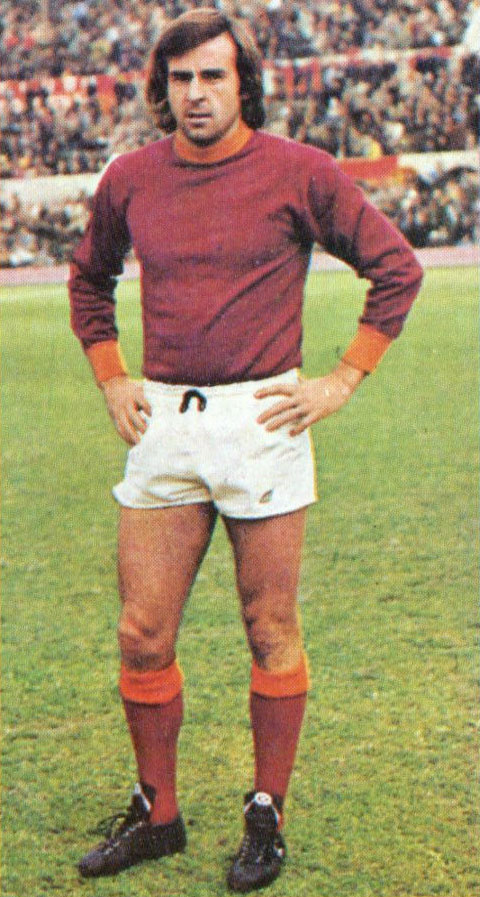
- Giorgio Morini with Roma in 1974.

Personal information
- Date of birth: 11 October 1947 (age 79)
- Place of birth: Carrara, Italy
- Height: 1.72 m (5 ft 8 in)
- Position: Midfielder

Senior career*
| Years | Team | Apps | (Gls) |
| 1967–1968 | Internazionale | 0 | (0) |
| 1968–1972 | Varese | 84 | (7) |
| 1972–1976 | Roma | 105 | (5) |
| 1976–1981 | Milan | 75 | (4) |
| 1981–1983 | Pro Patria | 55 | (1) |
| 1983–1984 | Chiasso | 13 | (1) |

International career
| 1975 | Italy | 3 | (0) |

Managerial career
- 1996: Milan
- * Club domestic league appearances and goals

Giorgio Morini (Italian pronunciation: [ˈdʒordʒo moˈriːni]; born 11 October 1947) is an Italian former football manager and player, who played as a midfielder. As a player, Morini was part of the A.C. Milan team that won the 1978–79 Serie A title. He also coached the Italian football team Milan for part of the 1996–97 season.

== Club career ==
Born in Carrara, Morini started his career with Inter during the 1967–68 season, but never played a game for the side. He moved to Varese the following year, spending four seasons with the club. He made his Serie A debut against Cagliari on 6 October 1968.

After moving to Roma in 1972, Morini made a name for himself, representing the capital side for the next four seasons. In 1976, he earned a contract with A.C. Milan, spending another four seasons there, and winning the Scudetto in 1979.

After two seasons at minor club Pro Patria and a short spell with low-league team Chiasso, Morini ended his career in 1984.

== International career ==
He played three games for the Italy national football team in 1975, making his debut on 19 April against Poland.

== Controversy ==
Morini was linked to the 1980 Totonero illegal Italian football gambling scandal, and was suspended from play for ten months.

== Managerial career ==
Giorgio Morini took up coaching, once his active career came to an end, leading youth-teams to glory, primarily at Italian club A.C. Milan. When Óscar Tabárez was fired from the Rossonero senior side in 1996, Morini took over for a short period during the 1996–97 Serie A season; that was his first and, until now, last run as a coach of a top-flight side.
