= Luciano Zecchini =

Italian footballer and coach

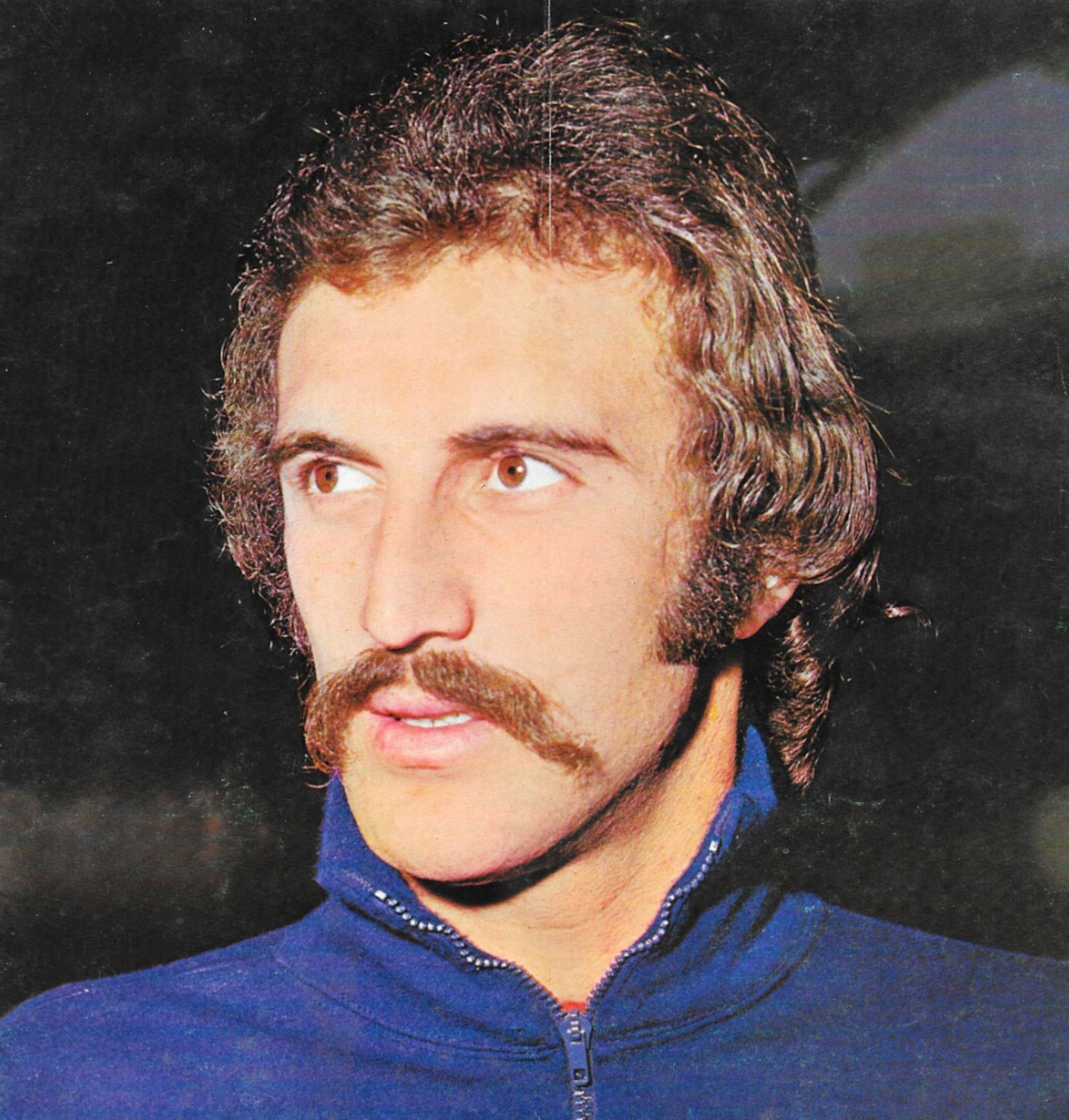
- Zecchini with Torino in the 1971–72 season

Personal information
- Date of birth: 10 March 1949 (age 77)
- Place of birth: Forlimpopoli, Italy
- Height: 1.80 m (5 ft 11 in)
- Position: Defender

Senior career*
Years	Team	Apps	(Gls)
1965–1967	Forlì	37	(0)
1967–1969	Prato	67	(1)
1969–1970	Brescia	12	(0)
1970–1974	Torino	93	(0)
1974–1975	Milan	26	(0)
1975–1977	Sampdoria	53	(2)
1977–1980	Perugia	45	(0)
1980–1982	banned		
1982–1984	Massese	39	(0)

International career
1969	Italy U-21	1	(0)
1974	Italy	3	(0)

Managerial career
- 1990–1992: Lecco
- 1992–1993: Oltrepò
- 1993–1995: Solbiatese
- 1995–1998: Tempio
- 1998–1999: Pro Patria
- 1999–2000: Tempio
- 2000–2001: Rimini
- 2001–2005: Teramo
- 2005–2006: Sambenedettese
- 2006–2007: Portogruaro
- 2008–2009: Isola Liri
- * Club domestic league appearances and goals

Luciano Zecchini (Italian pronunciation: [luˈtʃaːno ddzekˈkiːni]; born 10 March 1949) is an Italian professional football coach and a former player, who played as a defender.

== Career ==
Zecchini began playing football with local side Forlì. After a spell with lower-level sides Patro, he joined Brescia in 1969, where he would make his Serie A debut against Roma on 21 September 1969. He played 11 seasons (229 games, 2 goals) in the Serie A for Brescia Calcio, Torino Calcio, A.C. Milan, U.C. Sampdoria and Perugia Calcio.

He made his debut for the Italy national football team on 28 September 1974 in a game against Yugoslavia.

His playing career on a professional level ended with a 3-year ban from football in the Totonero 1980 match-fixing scandal.

== Honours ==
Torino

- Coppa Italia winner: 1970–71.
