= Simone Boldini =

Italian footballer and coach

Personal information
- Date of birth: 23 May 1954 (age 72)
- Place of birth: Ghedi, Italy
- Height: 1.82 m (5 ft 11 1/2 in)
- Position: Defender

Youth career
- Milan

Senior career*
Years	Team	Apps	(Gls)
1971–1973	Milan	0	(0)
1972–1973	→ Spezia (loan)	24	(0)
1973–1976	Como	59	(2)
1976–1979	Milan	26	(1)
1979–1983	Ascoli	108	(4)
1983–1985	Napoli	38	(0)
1985–1987	Atalanta	28	(0)

Managerial career
- 1992–1994: FBC Saronno 1910
- 1994–1996: Monza
- 1997–1998: Carrarese
- 1998–1999: Livorno
- 1999–2000: Pro Sesto
- 2001–2003: Monza
- 2004–2005: Como
- 2007–2010: Lugano
- 2010–2011: Renate
- 2011–2012: Tritium
- 2013–2015: Renate
- * Club domestic league appearances and goals

Simone Boldini (born 23 May 1954 in Ghedi) is an Italian professional football coach and a former player.

== Career ==
=== Player ===
He has played 12 seasons (228 games, 5 goals) in the Serie A for Calcio Como, A.C. Milan, Ascoli Calcio 1898, S.S.C. Napoli and Atalanta B.C.

=== Manager ===
In the 2011–12 season, Boldini was appointed as the head coach of the Tritium in the Lega Pro Prima Divisione, but on 29 April 2012 he was sacked.

== Honours ==
=== Player ===
Milan

- Serie A champion: 1978–79.
