= Duino Gorin =

Italian footballer (born 1951)

Personal information
- Date of birth: 26 March 1951 (age 75)
- Place of birth: Pellestrina, Italy
- Height: 1.71 m (5 ft 7 1/2 in)
- Position: Midfielder

Senior career*
Years	Team	Apps	(Gls)
1966–1969	Venezia	31	(0)
1969–1974	Varese	67	(9)
1971–1972	→ Cesena (loan)	5	(0)
1974–1977	Milan	60	(2)
1977–1980	Monza	86	(5)
1980–1981	Teramo	26	(1)
- * Club domestic league appearances and goals

Duino Gorin (born 26 March 1951) is a retired Italian professional footballer who played as a midfielder.

== Career ==
Gorin played for 4 seasons (61 games, 2 goals) in the Serie A for A.S. Varese 1910 and A.C. Milan.

== Personal life ==
Gorin's younger brother Fabrizio Gorin also played football professionally. To distinguish them, Duino was referred to as Gorin I and Fabrizio as Gorin II.

== Honours ==
Milan

- Coppa Italia winner: 1976–77.
