= Giovanni Lorini =

Italian footballer and coach

Personal information
- Date of birth: March 14, 1957 (age 69)
- Place of birth: Travagliato, Italy
- Height: 1.73 m (5 ft 8 in)
- Position: Midfielder

Youth career
- Milan

Senior career*
Years	Team	Apps	(Gls)
1974–1977	Milan	10	(0)
1975–1976	→ Venezia (loan)	30	(3)
1977	L.R. Vicenza	4	(0)
1977–1979	Monza	68	(3)
1979–1981	Genoa	61	(1)
1981–1983	Brescia	53	(1)
1983–1986	Monza	73	(5)

Managerial career
- 2000–2001: Rodengo Saiano
- 2005–2006: Modica
- * Club domestic league appearances and goals

Giovanni Alfredo Lorini (born March 14, 1957) is an Italian professional football coach and former player.

He played 3 seasons (14 games, no goals) in Serie A for A.C. Milan and L.R. Vicenza, and made 299 appearances altogether in the Italian professional leagues.

His playing career ended with a five-year ban from football in the Totonero 1986 match-fixing scandal.

== Honours ==
- Coppa Italia winner: 1976–77
