= Gustavo Giagnoni =

Italian footballer and coach (1932–2018)

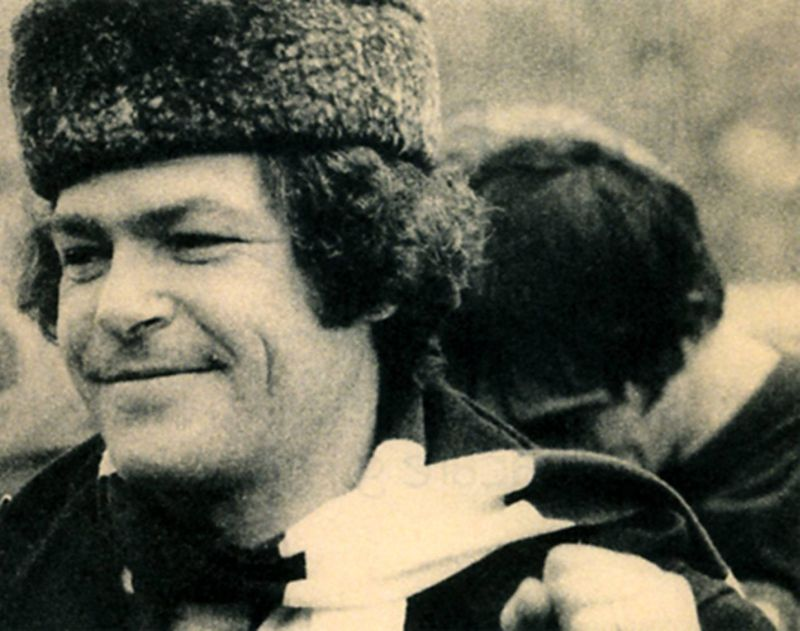

Personal information
- Date of birth: 23 March 1932
- Place of birth: Olbia, Italy
- Date of death: 7 August 2018 (aged 86)
- Place of death: Folgaria, Italy
- Position: Defender

Senior career*
Years	Team	Apps	(Gls)
1952–1955	Olbia	71	(23)
1955–1957	Reggiana	12	(0)
1957–1964	Mantova	200	(32)
1964–1965	Reggiana	37	(1)
1965–1968	Mantova	95	(1)

Managerial career
- 1969–1971: Mantova
- 1971–1974: Torino
- 1974–1975: A.C. Milan
- 1976–1977: Bologna
- 1977–1979: Roma
- 1979–1980: Pescara
- 1980–1981: Udinese
- 1982–1983: Cagliari
- 1983–1984: Palermo
- 1986–1987: Cagliari
- 1990–1992: Cremonese
- 1992–1993: Mantova
- 1997: Sardinia
- * Club domestic league appearances and goals

Gustavo Giagnoni (23 March 1932 – 7 August 2018) was an Italian professional footballer and coach. He played as a defender.

As a player, he started his career with hometown side Olbia Calcio. He went on to spend a decade playing as a sweeper for Mantova and three seasons at Reggiana.

Giagnoni died on 7 August 2018, at the age of 86.

== Honours ==
=== Player ===
Mantova

- Serie C: 1958–59

=== Manager ===
Mantova

- Serie B: 1970–71
- Serie C2:: 1992–93

=== Individual ===
- Torino FC Hall of Fame: 2018
