= Giovanni Sartori (footballer) =

Italian footballer and official

Personal information
- Date of birth: 31 March 1957 (age 69)
- Place of birth: Lodi, Italy
- Height: 1.80 m (5 ft 11 in)
- Position: Striker

Team information
- Current team: Bologna (technical director)

Youth career
- Milan

Senior career*
Years	Team	Apps	(Gls)
1974–1979	Milan	7	(0)
1975–1976	→ Venezia (loan)	25	(6)
1976–1977	→ Udinese (loan)	11	(2)
1977–1978	→ Bolzano (loan)	29	(11)
1979–1981	Sampdoria	45	(11)
1981–1982	Cavese	26	(6)
1982–1983	Arezzo	18	(2)
1983–1984	Ternana	21	(3)
1984–1989	Chievo	113	(33)
- * Club domestic league appearances and goals

Giovanni Sartori (born 31 March 1957) is an Italian football official and a former professional player who currently works as technical director of Bologna.

== Playing career ==
Throughout his playing career as a forward, Sartori scored 43 goals from 217 appearances in the Italian professional leagues, which included 7 appearances without scoring in the 1978–79 Serie A season for A.C. Milan, winning the championship with the team.

== Sporting director career ==
Satori was the director of sports for ChievoVerona from 1992 to 2014, and then joined Atalanta as technical director. During his tenures with Chievo and Atalanta, both clubs qualified for the UEFA Champions League for the first time in their history.

He was fined €15,000 for his involvement in the 2006 false accounting scandal.

In 2021, he was inducted into the Italian Football Hall of Fame.

In 2022, he became the technical director of Bologna. Under his direction, Bologna qualified for the Champions League for the first time in their history (since the competition's re-establishment in 1992) during the 2023–24 season, and also won the Coppa Italia in 2025, a title the club had not won since 1974.

== Honours ==
=== Club ===
Milan

- Serie A: 1978–79

=== Individual ===
- Italian Football Hall of Fame: 2021
