= 1986 Totonero =

Scandal of football match fixing in Italy between 1984 and 1986

Totonero 1986 or Totonero bis was a scandal of football match fixing in Italy between 1984 and 1986 in Serie A, Serie B, Serie C1 and Serie C2.

It was uncovered in May 1986 by Italian Police and Armando Carbone, a friend of Italo Allodi (manager of Napoli), and in this scandal there were managers and football players that sold the football matches for money.

== Club punishments ==
- Udinese (Serie A); 9 point penalty in Serie A 1986–87 (relegated in Serie B in original punishment).
- Cagliari (Serie B); 5 point penalty in Serie B 1986–87.
- Lazio (Serie B); 9 point penalty in Serie B 1986–87 (relegated in Serie C1 in original punishment).
- Lanerossi Vicenza (Serie B); exclusion from Serie A 1986–87.
- Triestina (Serie B); 1 point penalty in Serie B 1985–86 and 4 point penalty in Serie B 1986–87.
- Perugia (Serie B); relegated in Serie C2 and 2 point penalty in 1986–87 (relegated in Serie C2 and 5 point penalty in 1986–87 in original punishment).
- Palermo (Serie B); 5 point penalty in Serie B 1986–87.
- Foggia (Serie C1); 5 point penalty in Serie C1 1986–87 (relegated in Serie C2 in original punishment).
- Cavese (Serie C1); relegated in Serie C2 and 5 point penalty in 1986–87.

== Sentences ==
Presidents

- Guerino Amato (Cavese's president); 5 years with exclusion from FIGC.
- Spartaco Ghini (Perugia's president); 5 years with exclusion from FIGC.
- Dario Mascharin (Vicenza's president); 3 years (5 years with exclusion from FIGC in original punishment).
- Salvatore Matta (Palermo's president); 4 months.
- Costantino Rozzi (Ascoli's president); 4 months.

Managers and coaches

- Guido Magherini (Rondinella); 5 years with exclusion from FIGC.
- Tito Corsi (Udinese); 5 years with exclusion from FIGC.
- Gian Filippo Reali (Sarnico); 3 years and 9 months (3 years and 3 months in original punishment).
- Ernesto Bronzetti (Foggia); 3 years (5 years with exclusion from FIGC in original punishment).
- Antonio Pigino (Pro Vercelli); 3 years.
- Giancarlo Salvi (Vicenza); 3 years.
- Renzo Ulivieri (Cagliari's coach); 3 years.
- Francesco Janich (Bari); 6 months (1 year in original punishment).
- Aldo Agroppi (Perugia's coach); 4 months.
- Onofrio Schillaci (Palermo); 4 months.
- Gastone Rizzato (Vicenza); 4 months.
- Giorgio Vitali (Monza); 4 months.

Players

- Franco Cerilli (Vicenza); 5 years with exclusion from FIGC.
- Claudio Vinazzani (Lazio); 5 years with exclusion from FIGC.
- Giovanni Lorini (Monza); 5 years with exclusion from FIGC.
- Maurizio Rossi (Pescara); 5 years with exclusion from FIGC.
- Massimo Caccia (Messina); 5 years.
- Giuseppe Guerini (Palermo); 3 years and 1 month.
- Giovanni Vavassori (Campania-Puteolana); 3 years and 4 months (3 years in original punishment).
- Giovanni Bidese (Pro Vercelli); 3 years and 3 months (3 years in original punishment).
- Maurizio Braghin (Triestina); 3 years.
- Sauro Massi (Perugia); 3 years.
- Giuseppe Ronco (Palermo); 3 years.
- Giacomo Chinellato (Cagliari); 2 years.
- Mauro Melotti (Spal); 1 year and 6 months (3 years in original punishment).
- Alfio Filosofi (Virescit Bergamo); 6 months (1 year in original punishment).
- Onofrio Barone (Palermo); 5 months.
- Luigi Cagni (Sambenedettese); 4 months.
- Antonio Gasparini (Monza); 4 months.
- Mario Giudetti (Pro Vercelli); 4 months.
- Tullio Gritti (Brescia); 4 months.
- Tiziano Manfrin (Sambenedettese); 4 months.
- Antonio Bogoni (Cesena); 4 months.
- Stefano Donetti (Martina Franca); 3 months.
- Silvano Benedetti (Palermo); 1 month.
- Tebaldo Bigliardi (Palermo); 1 month.
- Massimo Bursi (Palermo); 1 month.
- Gianni De Biasi (Palermo); 1 month.
- Oliviero Di Stefano (Palermo); 1 month.
- Franco Falcetta (Palermo); 1 month.
- Andrea Pallanch (Palermo); 1 month.
- Claudio Pellegrini (Palermo); 1 month.
- Mario Piga (Palermo); 1 month.
- Michele Pintauro (Palermo); 1 month.
- Mario Romiti (Barletta); 1 month.
- Orazio Sorbello (Palermo); 1 month.

== Aftermath ==
- Udinese and Cagliari were relegated from Serie A and Serie B, respectively, the following season. Udinese would have remained in Serie A if not for their point deduction, but Cagliari would have been relegated even without the penalty.
