= Giorgio Braglia =

Italian footballer

Personal information
- Date of birth: 19 February 1947 (age 79)
- Place of birth: Bomporto, Italy
- Height: 1.81 m (5 ft 11 1/2 in)
- Positions: Midfielder; forward

Senior career*
| Years | Team | Apps | (Gls) |
| 1966–1969 | Modena | 46 | (7) |
| 1969–1970 | Roma | 7 | (1) |
| 1970–1971 | Brescia | 18 | (3) |
| 1971–1972 | Fiorentina | 1 | (0) |
| 1972–1973 | Foggia | 31 | (9) |
| 1973–1976 | Napoli | 80 | (24) |
| 1976–1977 | Milan | 3 | (0) |
| 1977–1978 | Foggia | 8 | (0) |
- * Club domestic league appearances and goals

Giorgio Braglia (born 19 February 1947 in Bomporto) is a retired Italian professional football player who played as a midfielder or as a forward.

== Career ==
Throughout his club career, Braglia played 7 seasons in Serie A for A.S. Roma, ACF Fiorentina, S.S.C. Napoli, A.C. Milan, and U.S. Foggia, making 99 appearances, and scoring 25 goals in total during his time in the Italian top division. During his time with Napoli, he wore the number 11 shirt; under manager Luís Vinício, Napoli were known for their exciting style of play and came close to winning the league title during the 1974–75 season, in which Braglia scored 12 goals. Braglia won the 1975–76 Coppa Italia with the club, scoring a goal in the victorious final; in total he made 80 appearances for Napoli during his three seasons with the team, scoring 24 goals.

The following season, he joined Milan in exchange for Luciano Chiarugi, with whom he shared the nickname Cavallo Pazzo ("Crazy" or "Mad Horse", in Italian). During his first season with Milan, he won the 1976–77 Coppa Italia, and was also the top-scorer of the tournament, with 6 goals.

== Style of play ==
Braglia was nicknamed Cavallo Pazzo (mad horse) by the Napoli fans, due to his energetic runs up and down the flank. His long hair and moustache made him a highly recognisable player. A talented player, he was capable of playing both as a midfielder and as a forward, and was known for his dribbling skills and eye for goal; however, he also earned a reputation throughout his career as a player who had a tendency to miss easy goalscoring chances, and for being tactically undisciplined.

== Personal life ==
Giorgio's father, Renato Braglia, was also a footballer, and holds the record for most appearances for Modena F.C. with 484 games, the club with which Giorgio began his career in 1967, before leaving for Roma in 1969.

== Honours ==
=== Club ===
Napoli

- Coppa Italia winner: 1975–76.

Milan

- Coppa Italia winner: 1976–77.

=== Individual ===
- Coppa Italia Top-scorer: 1976–77 (6 goals, alongside Egidio Calloni).
