= Aldo Bet =

Italian footballer (1949–2023)

Personal information
- Date of birth: 26 March 1949
- Place of birth: Mareno di Piave, Italy
- Date of death: 12 November 2023 (aged 74)
- Place of death: Varese, Italy
- Height: 1.85 m (6 ft 1 in)
- Position: Defender

Youth career
- Inter Milan

Senior career*
Years	Team	Apps	(Gls)
1967–1968	Inter Milan	8	(0)
1968–1973	Roma	130	(0)
1973–1974	Verona	30	(0)
1974–1981	AC Milan	144	(0)
1981–1982	Campania	7	(0)

International career
1969–1970	Italy U21	3	(0)
1971	Italy	2	(0)
- * Club domestic league appearances and goals

Aldo Bet (Italian pronunciation: [ˈaldo ˈbɛt]; 26 March 1949 – 12 November 2023) was an Italian professional footballer who played as a defender. An old-fashioned stopper, he was a sturdy and physically imposing defender, who was known for his tenacious man marking of opposing players.

== Career ==
An Inter Milan youth product, Bet was later promoted to the senior squad, before manager Helenio Herrera brought him to Roma, where he made his breakthrough, winning a Coppa Italia, and also earning a call-up to play for the Italy national team. After five seasons with Roma, and one with Verona, he joined AC Milan in the summer of 1974. He was usually paired alongside a sweeper in the team's defence: first Maurizio Turone, and later a young Franco Baresi; he won a second Coppa Italia with Milan, and was a member of the team that won club's tenth league title in 1979.

== Death ==
Bet died in Varese on 12 November 2023, at the age of 74.

== Honours ==
Roma

- Coppa Italia: 1968–69

AC Milan

- Serie A: 1978–79
- Coppa Italia: 1976–77

Individual

- AC Milan Hall of Fame
