= Alberto Bigon =

Italian football player and manager (born 1947)

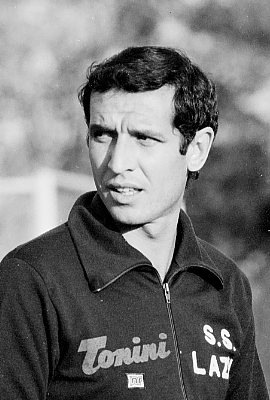

Personal information
- Date of birth: 31 October 1947 (age 78)
- Place of birth: Padua, Italy
- Height: 1.80 m (5 ft 11 in)
- Position: Attacking midfielder

Senior career*
Years	Team	Apps	(Gls)
1964–1966	Padova	64	(14)
1966–1967	Napoli	0	(0)
1967–1969	SPAL	49	(10)
1969–1971	Foggia	65	(18)
1971–1980	A.C. Milan	218	(56)
1980–1982	Lazio	57	(12)
1982–1984	Vicenza	57	(14)
Total		510	(124)

Managerial career
- 1986–1987: Reggina
- 1987–1989: Cesena
- 1989–1991: Napoli
- 1991–1992: Lecce
- 1992–1993: Udinese
- 1994–1995: Ascoli
- 1996–1997: Sion
- 1997–1998: Perugia
- 1999–2000: Olympiacos
- 2007–2008: Sion
- 2008: Interblock Ljubljana
- * Club domestic league appearances and goals

Alberto "Albertino" Bigon (born 31 October 1947) is an Italian football manager and former player, who played as a midfielder or forward.

== Playing career ==
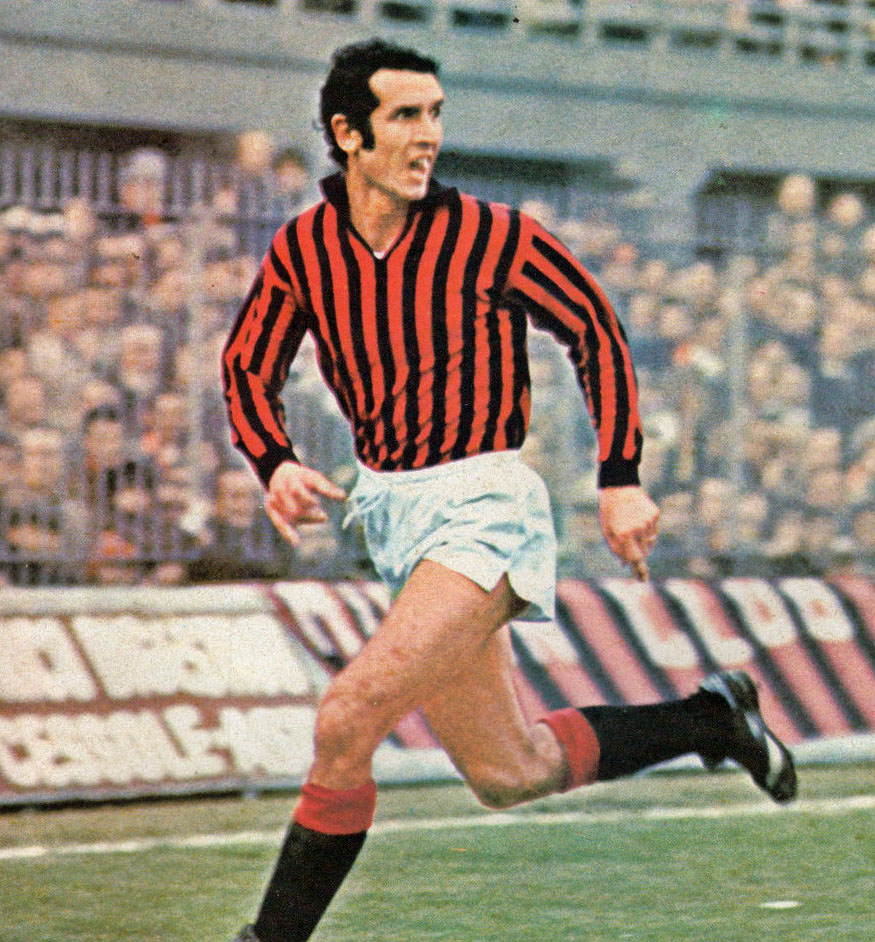
Bigon playing for A.C. Milan at San Siro in the 1974–75 season.

Born in Padua, Bigon started his playing career for his native city team Padova. He made his Serie A debut with SPAL in 1967, but obtained most of his playing triumphs with A.C. Milan, where he played from 1971 to 1980. He appeared in 218 league matches with A.C. Milan, scoring 56 goals and winning a Serie A championship in 1979, as well as three Coppa Italia tournaments (1972, 1973, 1977) and a Cup Winners' Cup (1973). He also served as Milan's captain. Bigon retired from playing football in 1984, after two two-year spells with Lazio and Vicenza.

== Style of play ==
Bigon was a tactically intelligent attacking midfielder, with a slender physique and an eye for goal, who was also capable of playing as a forward.

== Coaching career ==
Bigon coached his first team, Reggina, in 1986–1987, then Cesena, in 1987. He coached Cesena until 1989, when he left to coach Napoli, then led by Diego Maradona. He immediately won a Serie A championship, the second in Napoli's history. He then won the Italian Super Cup the same year. He left the club in 1991, after a poor eighth place followed by Maradona's forced farewell to Napoli. He then coached minor clubs such as Lecce (Serie B), Udinese (Serie A, saved from relegation after playoffs) and Ascoli (Serie B). In 1996, he was appointed coach of Swiss team FC Sion, which he led to win Swiss Super League for its second time in history. Bigon then tried an unsuccessful return to Serie A with Perugia. In November 1999 he was appointed coach of Greek club Olympiacos, but was dismissed on 10 April 2000 despite the first place in the championship table.

After seven years without a job, Bigon made a comeback to football in February 2007, when he was appointed coach of FC Sion, a team he already managed years before.

In August 2008, he became head coach of Slovenian football team Interblock Ljubljana. However, this experience lasted only a very short time, as Bigon left the club in September 2008 by mutual consent with the club due to personal health issues.

== Honours ==
=== Player ===
Milan

- Serie A: 1978–79
- Coppa Italia: 1971–72, 1972–73, 1976–77
- European Cup Winners' Cup: 1972–73

=== Coach ===
Napoli

- Serie A: 1989–90
- Supercoppa Italiana: 1990

Sion

- Swiss Nationalliga A: 1996–97
- Swiss Cup: 1996–97

Olympiacos

- Alpha Ethniki: 1999–2000

=== Individual ===
- Special Panchina d'oro: 1997
- A.C. Milan Hall of Fame
