= Giorgio Biasiolo =

Italian former professional footballer

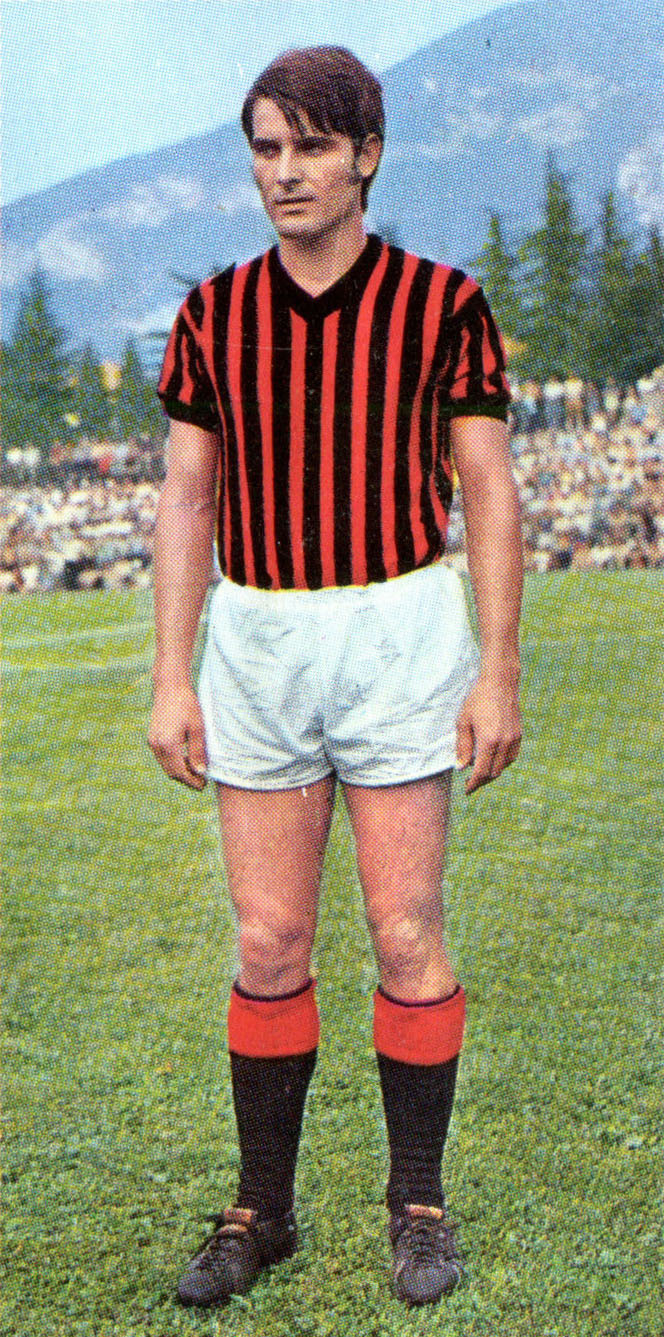
- Biasiolo with Milan in 1970

Personal information
- Full name: Giorgio Biasiolo
- Date of birth: 16 February 1946 (age 80)
- Place of birth: Montecchio Maggiore, Italy
- Height: 1.75 m (5 ft 9 in)
- Position: Midfielder

Youth career
- Marzotto Valdagno

Senior career*
Years	Team	Apps	(Gls)
1964–1978	Marzotto Valdagno	58	(6)
1968–1970	Lanerossi Vicenza	58	(3)
1970–1977	Milan	139	(13)
1977–1978	Lecce	19	(1)
1978–1980	Siracusa	51	(7)
1980–1981	Cerretese	16	(6)
- Arzignano
Total		341	(36)
- * Club domestic league appearances and goals

Giorgio Biasiolo (born 16 February 1946) is an Italian former professional footballer, who played as a midfielder. He made 197 appearances and scored 16 goals in Serie A, for Vicenza and Milan, during the late 1960s and 1970s.

== Honours ==
=== Club ===
- A.C. Milan
  - Coppa Italia: 1971–72, 1972–73, 1976–77
  - Cup Winners' Cup: 1972–73
