= Giuseppe Sabadini =

Italian footballer (born 1949)

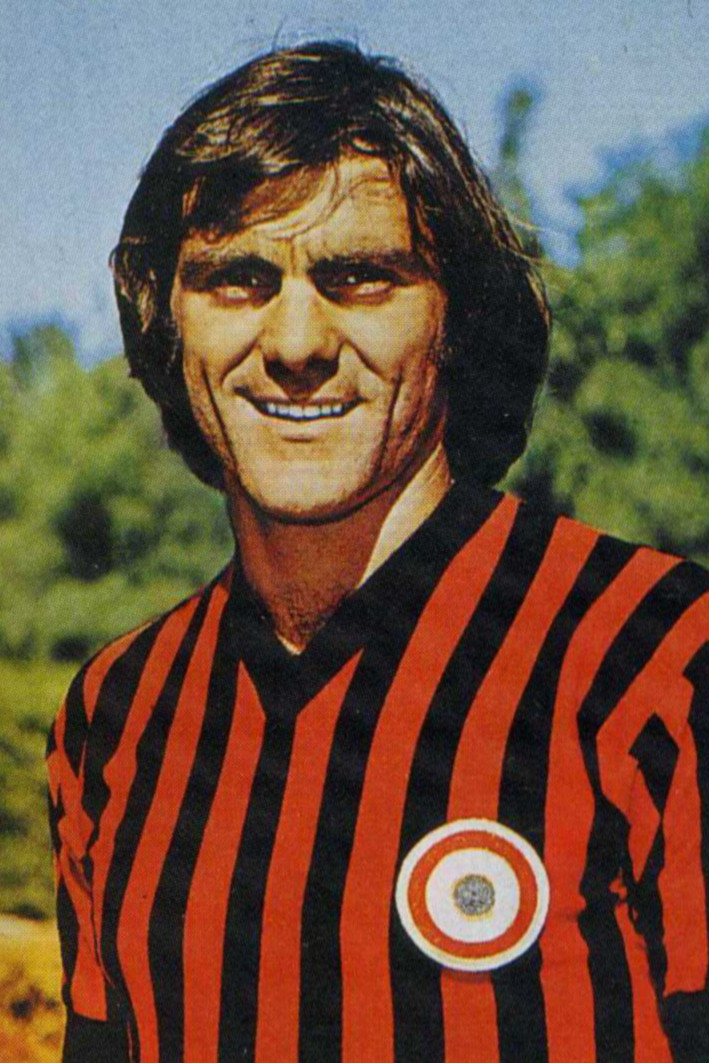
- Sabadini in 1972

Personal information
- Date of birth: 26 March 1949 (age 77)
- Place of birth: Sagrado, Italy
- Height: 1.78 m (5 ft 10 in)
- Position: Defender

Senior career*
Years	Team	Apps	(Gls)
1965–1971	Sampdoria	90	(4)
1971–1978	Milan	161	(12)
1978–1983	Catanzaro	111	(1)
1983–1984	Catania	16	(0)
1984–1986	Ascoli	23	(0)
Total		401	(17)

International career
1973–1974	Italy	4	(0)

Managerial career
- 1986–1988: Corigliano
- 1988–1989: Catanzaro (assistant)
- 1989–1990: Venezia
- 1990–1992: Alessandria
- 1993–1994: Avezzano
- 1995–1996: Messina
- 1996–1997: Catanzaro
- 1997–1999: Astrea
- 2000–2001: Castrovillari
- 2004–2005: Taranto
- * Club domestic league appearances and goals

Giuseppe Sabadini (Italian pronunciation: [dʒuˈzɛppe sabaˈdiːni]; born 26 March 1949) is an Italian football coach and former player, who played as a defender.

== Club career ==
Sabadini played 18 seasons (393 games, 17 goals) in the Serie A for Sampdoria, Milan, Catanzaro, Catania and Ascoli.

== International career ==
At international level, Sabadini earned four caps for the Italy national team, and was included in the Italian squad for the 1974 FIFA World Cup. He did not feature in any matches at the tournament.

== Honours ==
Milan

- Coppa Italia: 1971–72, 1972–73, 1976–77
- UEFA Cup Winners' Cup: 1972–73
