= Maurizio Turone =

Italian footballer (born 1948)

Personal information
- Date of birth: 27 October 1948 (age 78)
- Place of birth: Varazze, Italy
- Height: 1.78 m (5 ft 10 in)
- Position: Defender

Senior career*
Years	Team	Apps	(Gls)
1966–1967	Savona	0	(0)
1967–1972	Genoa	100	(9)
1972–1978	Milan	136	(2)
1978–1979	Catanzaro	17	(0)
1979–1982	Roma	74	(2)
1982–1983	Bologna	20	(0)
1983–1985	Savona		
1985–1986	Cairese		
- * Club domestic league appearances and goals

Maurizio Turone (born 27 October 1948 in Varazze) is a retired Italian professional footballer, who played as a defender, usually as a sweeper.

== Career ==
He played for 10 seasons (227 games, 4 goals) in the Serie A for A.C. Milan, F.C. Catanzaro and A.S. Roma.

He is most famous for the so-called Turone's goal. The goal he scored in a crucial league game against league-leading Juventus FC for second-placed A.S. Roma was disallowed as the linesman ruled he was offside. The game ended 0–0 and Juventus eventually clinched the title.

The TV images never clarified, in a definitive way, if the player's position was irregular or not. In the following years, conflicting opinions, projections with new technologies and alleged manipulation of slow motion continued to come in succession; in any case, from then on, the "Turone's goal" remained a hot topic in Italian football for decades to come.

== Honours ==
=== Club ===
Milan

- Coppa Italia winner: 1972–73, 1976–77.
- UEFA Cup Winners' Cup winner: 1972–73.

Roma

- Coppa Italia winner: 1979–80, 1980–81.
