= Egidio Calloni =

Italian footballer (born 1952)

Personal information
- Full name: Egidio Calloni
- Date of birth: 1 December 1952 (age 73)
- Place of birth: Busto Arsizio, Italy
- Height: 1.80 m (5 ft 11 in)
- Position: Striker

Youth career
- 1968–1970: Internazionale

Senior career*
Years	Team	Apps	(Gls)
1970–1971	Varese	0	(0)
1971–1972	Verbania (loan)	38	(15)
1972–1974	Varese	50	(23)
1974–1978	A.C. Milan	101	(31)
1978–1979	Verona	20	(8)
1979–1980	Perugia	12	(0)
1980–1981	Palermo	29	(11)
1981–1982	Como	8	(2)
- * Club domestic league appearances and goals

Egidio Calloni (born 1 December 1952) is an Italian former football striker, best known for his stint at A.C. Milan.

== Career ==
An Internazionale youth system product, Calloni then moved to Varese and then on loan to Serie C club Verbania. He returned at Varese in 1972, scoring 23 goals in two Serie B seasons, being noted by A.C. Milan. Signed by the rossoneri in 1974, he played four seasons with A.C. Milan as a regular, scoring 31 goals in 101 matches. He became however famous for his several striking mistakes which brought popular journalist Gianni Brera to nickname him "sciagurato Egidio" ("Egidio the wretched"), after a minor character from Alessandro Manzoni's novel The Betrothed.

He then played with little success with several other Serie A teams, such as Verona and Perugia, being a backup for Paolo Rossi in the latter. He then moved to Serie B club Palermo, scoring 11 goals in 29 matches (including a single match in the 1981–82 season) and being the rosanero topscorer in 1980–81. He then returned to play at Serie A level with Como, failing however to impress, being featured only eight times, and scoring two goals. He retired in 1982, aged 30.

== After retirement ==
Calloni currently works as an agent for a national gelato company of Italy. He was in the news in 2007 after having been involved in a car accident following a cerebral ischemia attack.

== Honours ==
=== Club ===
Milan

- Coppa Italia winner: 1976–77.

=== Individual ===
- Serie B Top-scorer: 1973–74.
- Coppa Italia Top-scorer: 1976–77 (6 goals, alongside Giorgio Braglia).
