= 1970–71 AC Milan season =

Milan Associazione Calcio
1970–71 season
- President: Franco Carraro (until 31 May 1971); Federico Sordillo
- Manager: Nereo Rocco
- Stadium: San Siro
- Serie A: 2nd
- Coppa Italia: Runners-up
- Top goalscorer: League: Pierino Prati (19); All: Prati (22)
- Average home league attendance: 53,319
Home colours	Away colours

During the 1970–1971 season Milan Associazione Calcio competed in Serie A and Coppa Italia.

== Summary ==
Nereo Rocco was confirmed as coach of the team for the 1970–71 season. During the transfer market, Giorgio Biasiolo, Romeo Benetti, Silvano Villa and Giulio Zignoli join the club, while, among others, Giovanni Lodetti, Saul Malatrasi and Angelo Benedicto Sormani leave. Gianni Rivera is confirmed as captain.

The season began with the three matches of the first round of the Coppa Italia, where Milan, in group 4 with Brescia, Mantova and Varese, obtained as many victories, thus qualifying for the quarter-finals.

In the league, Milan, after two draws in the first 2 games, obtained five consecutive victories, and moved to second place in the standings behind Napoli, also thanks to the victory in Turin against Juventus for 2–0 and in the derby with Inter for 3–0. On the 10th round, the Rossoneri beat the Neapolitans at the San Paolo (0–1, then 0–2 on a resolution by the sports judge for the throwing of firecrackers on the pitch by Napoli fans) and overtook them in the standings. At the end of the first half of the season, Milan were unbeaten with 24 points, two more than Napoli and three more than Inter. On matchday 20, the Nerazzurri defeated the Rossoneri for the first time in the championship and moved within just one point of their city rivals. Two rounds later, Inter hooked Milan at the top of the rankings and the following day they surpassed them thanks to the home defeat of the Rossoneri against Varese. Inter maintained the lead of the standings until the end, and Milan finished in second place, four points behind, which granted them the qualification to the first edition of the UEFA Cup.

The season ended, between May and June 1971, with the matches of the final round of the Coppa Italia, which Milan entered after eliminating Livorno in the quarter-finals (2–0 home win at the end of September and 4–0 away in early November). The Rossoneri, in the group with Fiorentina, Napoli and Torino, obtained three wins, one draw and two defeats and finished in first place in the standings with 7 points, tied with Torino. For the trophy to be awarded, a play-off between Milan and Turin was necessary, which took place on 27 June 1971 at the Ferraris Stadium in Genoa; Torino, after the 0–0 draw in the overtime, won on penalties by 5–3 and thus won their fourth Coppa Italia. Gianni Rivera, who in the play-off missed two out of five penalties (the regulation of the time, in fact, allowed more than one consecutive penalty to be kicked by a single player), was the top scorer of the competition, with seven goals, for the second time in his career.

Shortly before the end of the season, Franco Carraro left the position of president of the company, which was taken on by Federico Sordillo, previously vice-president of the club.

== Squad ==
Note: Flags indicate national team as defined under FIFA eligibility rules; some limited exceptions apply. Players may hold more than one non-FIFA nationality.

Pos.	Nation	Player
GK	ITA	Pierangelo Belli
GK	ITA	Fabio Cudicini
GK	ITA	Villiam Vecchi
DF	ITA	Angelo Anquilletti
DF	ITA	Cesare Cattaneo
DF	ITA	Giulio Zignoli
DF	ITA	Luigi Maldera
DF	ITA	Roberto Rosato
DF	GER	Karl-Heinz Schnellinger
MF	ITA	Vincenzo Zazzaro
MF	ITA	Pier Paolo Scarrone
MF	ITA	Roberto Casone

Pos.	Nation	Player
MF	ITA	Romeo Benetti
MF	ITA	Giorgio Biasiolo
MF	ITA	Guido Magherini
MF	ITA	Gianni Rivera (Captain)
MF	ITA	Giorgio Rognoni
MF	ITA	Giovanni Trapattoni (vice-captain)
FW	ITA	Lino Golin
FW	FRA	Nestor Combin
FW	ITA	Angelo Paina
FW	ITA	Pierino Prati
FW	ITA	Silvano Villa

== Transfers ==
=== Summer ===
In
Pos.	Name	from	Type
DF	Giulio Zignoli	Cagliari	end loan
MF	Romeo Benetti	Sampdoria	
MF	Giorgio Biasiolo	Vicenza	
FW	Angelo Paina	Triestina	end loan
FW	Silvano Villa	Alessandria	end loan

Out
Pos.	Name	To	Type
DF	Alberto Grossetti	Novara	
DF	Saul Malatrasi	SPAL	
DF	Nello Santin	Vicenza	loan
MF	Romano Fogli	Catania	
MF	Domenico Fontana	Vicenza	
MF	Giovanni Lodetti	Sampdoria	
FW	Angelo Marchi	Lecco	
FW	Angelo Benedicto Sormani	Napoli	
MF	Guido Magherini	Lazio	loan
FW	Lino Golin	Monza	loan

== Competitions ==
=== Serie A ===
==== League table ====
Pos	Team	Pld	W	D	L	GF	GA	GD	Pts	Qualification or relegation
1	Internazionale (C)	30	19	8	3	50	26	+24	46	Qualification to European Cup
2	Milan	30	15	12	3	54	26	+28	42	Qualification to UEFA Cup
3	Napoli	30	15	9	6	33	19	+14	39	Qualification to UEFA Cup
4	Juventus	30	11	13	6	41	30	+11	35	Qualification to UEFA Cup
5	Bologna	30	10	14	6	30	24	+6	34	Qualification to UEFA Cup

Source: Panini
(C) Champions

==== Matches ====
27 September 1970 1	Milan	1–1	Lazio	Milan
	Massa 40' (o.g.)	Report	70' Mazzola	Stadium: Stadio San Siro; Attendance: 60,375; Referee: Francescon

4 October 1970 2	Foggia	1–1	Milan	Foggia
	Bigon 67'	Report	26' Rivera	Stadium: Stadio Pino Zaccheria; Attendance: 24,557; Referee: Pieroni

11 October 1970 3	Milan	3–1	Sampdoria	Milan
	Villa 24', 39'; Benetti 46'	Report	87' Salvi	Stadium: Stadio San Siro; Attendance: 52,358; Referee: Giunti

25 October 1970 4	Juventus	0–2	Milan	Turin
		Report	40' Villa; 77' Prati	Stadium: Stadio Comunale; Attendance: 63,991; Referee: Angonese

8 November 1970 5	Milan	3–0	Inter Milan	Milan
	Biasiolo 51'; Villa 69'; Rivera 88'	Report		Stadium: Stadio San Siro; Attendance: 78,955; Referee: Gonella

15 November 1970 6	Fiorentina	2–5	Milan	Florence
	De Sisti 56'; Vitali 86' (pen.)	Report	20', 60' Combin; 34', 41' Prati; 52' Biasiolo	Stadium: Stadio Comunale; Attendance: 45,589; Referee: Francescon

22 November 1970 7	Milan	3–1	Lanerossi Vicenza	Milan
	Prati 9', 15', 71'	Report	45' (o.g.) Biasiolo	Stadium: Stadio San Siro; Attendance: 46,863; Referee: Mascali

29 November 1970 8	Varese	1–1	Milan	Varese
	Carelli 27'	Report	18' Villa	Stadium: Stadio Franco Ossola; Attendance: 19,710; Referee: Panzino

13 December 1970 9	Milan	1–1	Hellas Verona	Milan
	Combin 7'	Report	48' Clerici	Stadium: Stadio San Siro; Attendance: 31,177; Referee: Giunti

20 December 1970 10	Napoli	0–2	Milan	Naples
		Report		Stadium: Stadio San Paolo; Attendance: 84,688; Referee: Lo Bello

28 December 1970 11	Torino	1–1	Milan	Turin
	Agroppi 47'	Report	24' Villa	Stadium: Stadio Comunale; Attendance: 26,180; Referee: Sbardella

3 January 1971 12	Milan	4–0	Catania	Milan
	Benetti 11'; Prati 12', 20', 41'	Report		Stadium: Stadio San Siro; Attendance: 25,805; Referee: Francescon

10 January 1971 13	Milan	2–1	Bologna	Milan
	Prati 20'; Rognoni 53'	Report	68' Savoldi	Stadium: Stadio San Siro; Attendance: 64,195; Referee: Bernardis

17 January 1971 14	Cagliari	0–4	Milan	Cagliari
		Report	22' Maldera; 39' Benetti; 44' Prati; 71' Combin	Stadium: Stadio Sant'Elia; Attendance: 52,808; Referee: Gonella

24 January 1971 15	Milan	2–2	Roma	Milan
	Prati 39', 56'	Report	29' Franzot; 64' del Sol	Stadium: Stadio San Siro; Attendance: 43,292; Referee: Monti

31 January 1971 16	Lazio	0–1	Milan	Rome
		Report	19' Maldera	Stadium: Stadio Olimpico; Attendance: 56,065; Referee: Lo Bello

7 February 1971 17	Milan	2–0	Foggia	Milan
	Rivera 53' (pen.); Benetti 79'	Report		Stadium: Stadio San Siro; Attendance: 59,116; Referee: Toselli

14 February 1971 18	Sampdoria	1–1	Milan	Genoa
	Fotia 14'	Report	31' Combin	Stadium: Stadio Luigi Ferraris; Attendance: 49,672; Referee: Michelotti

28 February 1971 19	Milan	1–1	Juventus	Milan
	Prati 61'	Report	36' (o.g.) Anquilletti	Stadium: Stadio San Siro; Attendance: 78,882; Referee: Francescon

7 March 1971 20	Inter Milan	2–0	Milan	Milan
	Corso 12'; Mazzola 32'	Report		Stadium: Stadio San Siro; Attendance: 77,998; Referee: Lo Bello

14 March 1971 21	Milan	1–0	Fiorentina	Milan
	Prati 60'	Report		Stadium: Stadio San Siro; Attendance: 48,595; Referee: Gonella

21 March 1971 22	Lanerossi Vicenza	1–1	Milan	Vicenza
	Ciccolo 11'	Report	80' Benetti	Stadium: Stadio Romeo Menti; Attendance: 28,032; Referee: Sbardella

28 March 1971 23	Milan	1–2	Varese	Milan
	Prati 26' (pen.)	Report	31' (pen.) Tamborini; 53' Morini	Stadium: Stadio San Siro; Attendance: 52,706; Referee: Panzino

4 April 1971 24	Hellas Verona	1–3	Milan	Verona
	Mascetti 53'	Report	45' (pen.), 75' Rivera; 50' Benetti	Stadium: Stadio Marcantonio Bentegodi; Attendance: 28,157; Referee: Toselli

11 April 1971 25	Milan	1–1	Napoli	Milan
	Combin 5'	Report	23' (o.g.) Maldera	Stadium: Stadio San Siro; Attendance: 63,874; Referee: Lo Bello

18 April 1971 26	Milan	1–0	Torino	Milan
	Rivera 67'	Report		Stadium: Stadio San Siro; Attendance: 50,190; Referee: Pieroni

25 April 1971 27	Catania	0–0	Milan	Catania
		Report		Stadium: Stadio Cibali; Attendance: 13,313; Referee: Angonese

2 May 1971 28	Bologna	3–2	Milan	Bologna
	Fedele 44'; Rosato 76' (o.g.); Savoldi 78'	Report	7', 28' Villa	Stadium: Stadio Comunale; Attendance: 37,321; Referee: Toselli

16 May 1971 29	Milan	3–1	Cagliari	Milan
	Prati 59' (pen.), 73' (pen.); Scarrone 80'	Report	30' (pen.) Riva	Stadium: Stadio San Siro; Attendance: 43,408; Referee: Menegali

23 May 1971 30	Roma	1–1	Milan	Rome
	La Rosa 35'	Report	4' Prati	Stadium: Stadio Olimpico; Attendance: 43,096; Referee: Angonese

=== Coppa Italia ===
==== Group 4 ====
2 September 1970 1	Milan	4–0	Varese	Milan
	Rognoni 42'; Rivera 48' (pen.), 59' (pen.); Villa 66'			Stadium: Stadio San Siro; Attendance: 43,963; Referee: Trono

6 September 1970 2	Brescia	0–1	Milan	Brescia
			58' (pen.) Rivera	Stadium: Stadio Mario Rigamonti; Attendance: 13,877; Referee: Barbaresco

13 September 1970 3	Mantova	1–2	Milan	Mantova
	Ossola 29'		32' Combin; 39' Benetti	Stadium: Stadio Danilo Martelli; Attendance: 18,445; Referee: Bernardis

==== Quarterfinals ====
20 September 1970 1	Milan	2–0	Livorno	Milan
	Martini 32' (o.g.); Rivera 52' (pen.)			Stadium: Stadio San Siro; Attendance: 24,740; Referee: Lattanzi

4 November 1970 2	Livorno	0–4	Milan	Livorno
			3' Benetti; 35', 61' Rivera; 73' Combin	Stadium: Stadio Comunale; Attendance: 19,178; Referee: Monti

==== Final group ====
30 May 1971 1	Torino	1–0	Milan	Turin
	Agroppi 79'			Stadium: Stadio Comunale; Attendance: 22,152; Referee: Barbaresco

2 June 1971 2	Milan	2–2	Napoli	Milan
	Paina 25'; Prati 88'		21' (pen.) Improta; 45' Bianchi	Stadium: Stadio San Siro; Attendance: 13,355; Referee: Francescon

13 June 1971 3	Fiorentina	1–2	Milan	Firenze
	Chiarugi 67'		70' Prati; 81' Paina	Stadium: Stadio Comunale; Attendance: 35,000; Referee: Michelotti

16 June 1971 4	Milan	3–2	Torino	Milan
	Rosato 5'; Prati 29'; Combin 75'		52' Fossati; 89' Agroppi	Stadium: Stadio San Siro; Attendance: 42,986; Referee: Picasso

20 June 1971 5	Napoli	3–2	Milan	Naples
	Improta 26' (pen.); Altafini 65'; Juliano 73'		75' Combin; 84' Rivera	Stadium: Stadio San Paolo; Attendance: 18,616; Referee: Pieroni

23 June 1971 6	Milan	1–0	Fiorentina	Milan
	Benetti 5'			Stadium: Stadio San Siro; Attendance: 57,191; Referee: Angonese

==== Final play-off ====
27 June 1971 play-off	Torino	0–0 (a.e.t.) (5–3 p)	Milan	Genoa
				Stadium: Stadio Luigi Ferraris; Attendance: 31,627; Referee: Francescon
	Penalties
	Cereser (penalty missed); Maddè (penalty scored); Maddè (penalty scored); Maddè (penalty scored); Maddè (penalty scored); Maddè (penalty scored)		(penalty scored) Rivera; (penalty scored) Rivera; (penalty scored) Rivera; (penalty missed) Rivera; (penalty missed) Rivera

== Statistics ==
=== Squad statistics ===
Competition	Points	Home						Away						Total						GD
Competition	Points	G	W	D	L	Gs	Ga	G	W	D	L	Gs	Ga	G	W	D	L	Gs	Ga	GD
1970-71 Serie A	42	15	9	5	1	29	12	15	6	7	2	25	14	30	15	12	3	54	26	+28
1970-71 Coppa Italia	–	5	4	1	0	12	4	6	4	0	2	11	6	12	8	2	2	23	10	+13
Total	–	20	13	6	1	41	16	21	10	7	4	36	20	42	23	14	5	77	36	+41

=== Players statistics ===
No.	Pos	Nat	Player	Total		Serie A		Coppa Italia	
No.	Pos	Nat	Player	Apps	Goals	Apps	Goals	Apps	Goals
	DF	(Italy) ITA	Angelo Anquilletti	40	0	28	0	12	0
	DF	(Italy) ITA	Cesare Cattaneo	1	0	1	0	0	0
	GK	(Italy) ITA	Pierangelo Belli	15	-16	8	-7	7	-9
	MF	(Italy) ITA	Roberto Casone	7	0	6	0	1	0
	GK	(Italy) ITA	Fabio Cudicini	28	-20	23	-19	5	-1
	MF	(Italy) ITA	Giorgio Biasiolo	41	2	29	2	12	0
	MF	(Italy) ITA	Guido Magherini	0	0	0	0	0	0
	FW	(Italy) ITA	Lino Golin	0	0	0	0	0	0
	MF	(Italy) ITA	Pier Paolo Scarrone	1	1	1	1	0	0
	FW	(France) FRA	Nestor Combin	37	10	25	6	12	4
	MF	(Italy) ITA	Vincenzo Zazzaro	1	0	0	0	1	0
	DF	(Italy) ITA	Romeo Benetti	37	9	28	6	9	3
	DF	(Italy) ITA	Luigi Maldera	28	2	20	2	8	0
	DF	(Italy) ITA	Giulio Zignoli	18	0	7	0	11	0
	FW	(Italy) ITA	Pierino Prati	39	22	29	19	10	3
	MF	(Italy) ITA	Gianni Rivera	36	13	26	6	10	7
	MF	(Italy) ITA	Giorgio Rognoni	30	2	20	1	10	1
	DF	(Italy) ITA	Roberto Rosato	36	1	29	0	7	1
	FW	(Italy) ITA	Silvano Villa	26	9	20	8	6	1
	DF	(Germany) GER	Karl-Heinz Schnellinger	41	0	29	0	12	0
	FW	(Italy) ITA	Angelo Paina	11	2	4	0	7	2
	MF	(Italy) ITA	Giovanni Trapattoni	22	0	15	0	7	0
	GK	(Italy) ITA	Villiam Vecchi	0	0	0	-0	0	-0

== See also ==
- A.C. Milan

== Bibliography ==
- Panini (ed.). Almanacco illustrato del Milan, ed: 2, March 2005.
- Enrico Tosi. La storia del Milan, May 2005. Italia/Italy cid Tosi.
- Milan. Sempre con te, December 2009. Mondadori. 2009. ISBN 978-88-04-59118-4.
