= 1971 Coppa Italia final =

1971 Coppa Italia Final group 23rd Coppa Italia final
1970–71 Coppa Italia
- Date: 30 May – 27 June 1971

Final positions
- Champions: Torino
- Runners-up: Milan
- Third place: Fiorentina
- Fourth place: Napoli

The 1971 Coppa Italia final was a final group of the 1970–71 Coppa Italia. From 1968 to 1971, FIGC introduced a final group instead of semi–finals and finals. In the final group, four teams played against each other home–and–away in a round–robin format (30 May – 23 June 1971). In the final group standings, the top two teams each had 7 points, and a tie–breaking match needed to be played.
The play–off match was played on 27 June 1971 between Torino and Milan. Torino won 5–3 on penalties after the match ended 0–0 after extra time.

== Final group ==
Pos	Team	Pld	W	D	L	GF	GA	GD	Pts	ACM	TOR	FIO	NAP
1	Milan	6	3	1	2	10	9	+1	7	—	3–2	1–0	2–2
1	Torino	6	3	1	2	9	9	0	7	1–0	—	1–1	2–0
3	Fiorentina	6	2	2	2	9	5	+4	6	1–2	4–0	—	2–0
4	Napoli	6	1	2	3	7	12	−5	4	3–2	1–3	1–1	—

Source: historical-lineups.com

30 May 1971	Napoli	1–1	Fiorentina	Stadio San Paolo, Naples
	Juliano 16'		Mariani 7'	Referee: Alberto Picasso

30 May 1971	Torino	1–0	Milan	Stadio Comunale di Torino, Turin
	Agroppi 79'			Referee: Alberto Picasso

2 June 1971	Milan	2–2	Napoli	San Siro, Milan
	Paina 25'; Prati 88'		Improta 21' (pen.); Bianchi 45'	Referee: Francesco Francescon

2 June 1971	Fiorentina	4–0	Torino	Stadio Artemio Franchi, Florence
	Vitali 5'; De Sisti 72' (pen.); D'Alessi 78'; Chiarugi 90'			Referee: Francesco Panzino

13 June 1971	Napoli	1–3	Torino	Stadio San Paolo, Naples
	Juliano 50'		Rampanti 14' 23'; Bui 43'	Referee: Umberto Branzoni

13 June 1971	Fiorentina	1–2	Milan	Stadio Artemio Franchi, Florence
	Chiarugi 67'		Prati 70'; Paina 81'	Referee: Alberto Michelotti

16 June 1971	Fiorentina	2–0	Napoli	Stadio Artemio Franchi, Florence
	Esposito 24'; Vitali 27'			Referee: Riccardo Lattanzi

16 June 1971	Milan	3–2	Torino	San Siro, Milan
	Rosato 5'; Paina 29'; Combin 72'		Fossati 52'; Agroppi 89'	Referee: Alberto Picasso

20 June 1971	Torino	1–1	Fiorentina	Stadio Comunale di Torino, Turin
	Fossati 57'		Esposito 41'	Referee: Cesare Gussoni

20 June 1971	Napoli	3–2	Milan	Stadio San Paolo, Naples
	Improta 26' (pen.); Altafini 65'; Monticolo 73'		Combin 75'; Rivera 84'	Referee: Fulvio Pieroni

23 June 1971	Milan	1–0	Fiorentina	San Siro, Milan
	Benetti 5'			Referee: Aurelio Angonese

23 June 1971	Torino	2–0	Napoli	Stadio Comunale di Torino, Turin
	Petrini 19'; Ferrini 90'			Referee: Fabio Monti

== Tie-breaker final match ==
1971 Coppa Italia Final 23rd Coppa Italia Final
- Event: 1970–71 Coppa Italia
Torino	Milan
0	0
- After extra time Torino won 5–3 on penalties
- Date: 27 June 1971
- Venue: Stadio Marassi, Genoa
- Referee: Francesco Francescon

The tie-breaker was scheduled in Genoa the last Sunday of June 1971.

Both regular and extra times ended goalless. At time, penalties could be beaten by the same player. Two consecutive errors by the most prominent Milan’s player, Gianni Rivera, gave the trophy to their Piedmontese opponents.

27 June 1971
18:00

Torino	0–0 (a.e.t.)	Milan
Penalties
Cereser (penalty missed); Maddé (penalty scored); Maddé (penalty scored); Maddé (penalty scored); Maddé (penalty scored); Maddé (penalty scored)	5–3	(penalty scored) Rivera; (penalty scored) Rivera; (penalty scored) Rivera; (penalty missed) Rivera; (penalty missed) Rivera; Rivera resigned from the last shot

Stadio Luigi Ferraris, Genoa
Referee: Francesco Francescon

Torino	Milan

GK	1	(Italy) Luciano Castellini
DF	2	(Italy) Angelo Cereser
DF	3	(Italy) Natalino Fossati
MF	4	(Italy) Fabrizio Poletti
MF	5	(Italy) Giorgio Puia
MF	6	(Italy) Aldo Agroppi
RW	7	(Italy) Giorgio Ferrini (c)
CF	8	(Italy) Rosario Rampanti
CF	9	(Italy) Claudio Sala
CF	10	(Italy) Livio Luppi
LW	11	(Italy) Carlo Petrini	(substituted off) 77'
Substitutes:
MF		(Italy) Sergio Maddè	(substituted in) 77'
Manager:
(Italy) Giancarlo Cadé

GK	1	(Italy) Pierangelo Belli
DF	2	(Italy) Angelo Anquilletti
DF	3	(Italy) Giulio Zignoli
MF	4	(Italy) Giovanni Trapattoni
MF	5	(Germany) Karl-Heinz Schnellinger
MF	6	(Italy) Roberto Rosato
MF	7	(Italy) Gianni Rivera (c)
RW	8	(Italy) Giorgio Biasiolo
CF	9	(Italy) Giorgio Rognoni	(substituted off) 79'
CF	10	(Italy) Vincenzo Zazzaro
LW	11	(France) Nestor Combin
Substitutes:
CF		(Italy) Angelo Paina	(substituted in) 79'
Manager:
(Italy) Nereo Rocco

== See also ==
- 1970–71 AC Milan season
