= 1971–72 AC Milan season =

Milan Associazione Calcio
1971–72 season
- President: Federico Sordillo
- Manager: Nereo Rocco
- Stadium: San Siro
- Serie A: 2nd
- Coppa Italia: Winners
- UEFA Cup: Semi-finals
- Top goalscorer: League: Alberto Bigon (14); All: Alberto Bigon (19)
- Average home league attendance: 46,130
Home colours	Away colours

During the 1971–1972 season Milan Associazione Calcio competed in Serie A, Coppa Italia and UEFA Cup.

== Summary ==
Nereo Rocco was confirmed as coach of the team for the 1971–72 season. During the transfer market, Giuseppe Sabadini, Riccardo Sogliano and Alberto Bigon were signed, while, after 13 years in Milan Giovanni Trapattoni left the club, ending his career at Varese. The full-back Aldo Maldera, Luigi's younger brother, was also added to the team for the first time.

The season began with four group games in the first round of the Coppa Italia, where Milan got three wins (with Monza, Novara and Mantova) and a draw (with Catania), closing the group in first place with 7 points and thus qualifying for the second round, which would be played at the end of the season in June.

In the league, Milan suffered only two defeat in the first half of the season, both on home ground; the first at home against Juventus FC and the second against newly promoted Mantova, and finished in second position with 22 points, two less than the Bianconeri. In the second half of the season, Milan lost three games and drew the head-to-head clash with Juventus, and concluded the championship in second place with 42 points, tied with Torino, not without violent controversy for two episodes. The first, in the match against Juventus in Turin, when the referee Lo Bello did not concede a penalty to Milan, famously admitting, later on, on live tv, his mistake. The second, in the away game against Cagliari, when a contested penalty was awarded to the home team by referee Alberto Michelotti at the 87th minute, thus granting Cagliari the 2–1 win. Milan captain Gianni Rivera vehemently and publicly protested against such decision, with the consequence of being disqualified for three and a half months, thus ending his season. The Rossoneris defense, with 17 goals conceded, was the least beaten of the whole competition.

In the new UEFA Cup, which replaced the Inter-Cities Fairs Cup, Milan eliminated the Cypriots Digenis Akritas Morphou in the round of 64 (4–0 in the first leg in Milan and 3- 0 in the return in Trieste), in the round of 32 the West Germans of Hertha Berlin (4–2 win at home and 2–1 away defeat), in the round of 16 the Scottish team Dundee (win 3–0 at home and 2–0 away defeat) and in the quarter-finals the Belgian side Lierse (2–0 in Milan and 1–1 in Lier). In the semifinals, the Rossoneri faced English side Tottenham, who went through to the final thanks to the 2–1 victory obtained in London and the 1–1 draw at San Siro. This semifinal (also reached in the 2001–02 edition) is the best placement obtained by Milan in this competition.

The season ended with the aforementioned remaining matches in the Coppa Italia: Milan, in the group with Torino, Inter and Juventus, achieved four wins (two against Inter and two against Juventus) and two draws, and qualified for the final, where they faced Napoli. At the Stadio Olimpico in Rome, Milan beat the Neapolitans 2–0 with an own goal from Panzanato and a goal from Rosato in the second half, thus conquering the trophy for the second time in their history, and earning the qualification to the next UEFA Cup Winners' Cup.

== Squad ==
Note: Flags indicate national team as defined under FIFA eligibility rules; some limited exceptions apply. Players may hold more than one non-FIFA nationality.

Pos.	Nation	Player
GK	ITA	Pierangelo Belli
GK	ITA	Fabio Cudicini
GK	ITA	Villiam Vecchi
DF	ITA	Angelo Anquilletti
DF	ITA	Cesare Cattaneo
DF	ITA	Giulio Zignoli
DF	ITA	Luigi Maldera
DF	ITA	Roberto Rosato
DF	ITA	Aldo Maldera
DF	ITA	Giuseppe Sabadini
DF	ITA	Luciano Monticolo
DF	GER	Karl-Heinz Schnellinger (vice-captain)

Pos.	Nation	Player
MF	ITA	Vincenzo Zazzaro
MF	ITA	Pier Paolo Scarrone
MF	ITA	Romeo Benetti
MF	ITA	Giorgio Biasiolo
MF	ITA	Guido Magherini
MF	ITA	Gianni Rivera (Captain)
MF	ITA	Riccardo Sogliano
FW	ITA	Lino Golin
FW	ITA	Alberto Bigon
FW	ITA	Pierino Prati
FW	ITA	Silvano Villa
FW	ITA	Carlo Tresoldi

== Transfers ==
=== Summer ===
In
Pos.	Name	from	Type
DF	Giuseppe Sabadini	Sampdoria	
DF	Nello Santin	Vicenza	loan end
MF	Guido Magherini	Lazio	loan end
MF	Riccardo Sogliano	Varese	
FW	Alberto Bigon	Foggia	
FW	Lino Golin	Monza	loan end
DF	Luciano Monticolo	Catanzaro	

Out
Pos.	Name	To	Type
DF	Nello Santin	Sampdoria	
MF	Roberto Casone	Sampdoria	loan
MF	Giorgio Rognoni	Foggia	
MF	Giovanni Trapattoni	Varese	
FW	Nestor Combin	Metz	
FW	Angelo Paina	Taranto	
DF	Cesare Cattaneo	Taranto	
DF	Luigi Maldera	Catanzaro	

== Competitions ==
=== Serie A ===
==== League table ====
Pos	Team	Pld	W	D	L	GF	GA	GD	Pts	Qualification or relegation
1	Juventus (C)	30	17	9	4	48	24	+24	43	Qualification to European Cup
2	Milan	30	16	10	4	36	17	+19	42	Qualification to Cup Winners' Cup
3	Torino	30	17	8	5	39	25	+14	42	Qualification to UEFA Cup
4	Cagliari	30	15	9	6	39	23	+16	39	Qualification to UEFA Cup
5	Internazionale	30	13	10	7	49	28	+21	36	Qualification to UEFA Cup

Source: Panini
(C) Champions

==== Matches ====
3 October 1971 1	Varese	0–1	Milan	Varese
		Report	28' Prati	Stadium: Stadio Franco Ossola; Attendance: 16,762; Referee: Angonese

17 October 1971 2	Milan	2–0	Fiorentina	Milan
	Bigon 27', 61'	Report		Stadium: Stadio San Siro; Attendance: 59,006; Referee: Toselli

24 October 1971 3	Lanerossi Vicenza	0–2	Milan	Vicenza
		Report	41' Prati; 72' (pen.) Rivera	Stadium: Stadio Romeo Menti; Attendance: 25,848; Referee: Lo Bello

31 October 1971 4	Milan	1–4	Juventus	Milan
	Bigon 58'	Report	16', 28' Bettega; 39' Causio; 88' Anastasi	Stadium: Stadio San Siro; Attendance: 79,197; Referee: Francescon

7 November 1971 5	Sampdoria	0–2	Milan	Genoa
		Report	38' (pen.) Rivera; 46' Prati	Stadium: Stadio Luigi Ferraris; Attendance: 25,852; Referee: Barbaresco

14 November 1971 6	Milan	0–0	Cagliari	Milan
		Report		Stadium: Stadio San Siro; Attendance: 48,128; Referee: Angonese

28 November 1971 7	Inter Milan	2–3	Milan	Milan
	Ghio 18'; Boninsegna 42'	Report	2', 85' Bigon; 30' Rivera	Stadium: Stadio San Siro; Attendance: 70,536; Referee: Lo Bello

5 December 1971 8	Milan	0–1	Mantova	Milan
		Report	87' Panizza	Stadium: Stadio San Siro; Attendance: 32,609; Referee: Serafino

12 December 1971 9	Bologna	0–2	Milan	Bologna
		Report	8', 46' Prati	Stadium: Stadio Comunale; Attendance: 33,261; Referee: Pieroni

19 December 1971 10	Milan	3–0	Roma	Milan
	Bigon 35'; Villa 82', 83'	Report		Stadium: Stadio San Siro; Attendance: 34,243; Referee: Lo Bello

26 December 1971 11	Milan	2–0	Hellas Verona	Milan
	Bigon 2', 19'	Report		Stadium: Stadio San Siro; Attendance: 28,221; Referee: Trinchieri

2 January 1972 12	Torino	0–0	Milan	Turin
		Report		Stadium: Stadio Comunale; Attendance: 32,323; Referee: Barbaresco

9 January 1972 13	Napoli	0–0	Milan	Naples
		Report		Stadium: Stadio San Paolo; Attendance: 78,886; Referee: Pieroni

16 January 1972 14	Milan	1–0	Atalanta	Milan
	Sogliano 62'	Report		Stadium: Stadio San Siro; Attendance: 36,061; Referee: Mascali

23 January 1972 15	Catanzaro	0–0	Milan	Catanzaro
		Report		Stadium: Stadio Comunale; Attendance: 16,624; Referee: Angonese

30 January 1972 16	Milan	3–1	Varese	Milan
	Benetti 48'; Villa 58'; Dellagiovanna 88' (o.g.)	Report	54' (o.g.) Sabadini	Stadium: Stadio San Siro; Attendance: 31,884; Referee: Calì

6 February 1972 17	Fiorentina	2–0	Milan	Florence
	Clerici 48' (pen.); Anquilletti 54' (o.g.)	Report		Stadium: Stadio Comunale; Attendance: 50,677; Referee: Lattanzi

13 February 1972 18	Milan	1–1	Lanerossi Vicenza	Milan
	Benetti 54'	Report	73' Maraschi	Stadium: Stadio San Siro; Attendance: 40,293; Referee: Toselli

20 February 1972 19	Juventus	1–1	Milan	Turin
	Salvadore 78'	Report	32' Bigon	Stadium: Stadio Comunale; Attendance: 66,344; Referee: Lo Bello

27 February 1972 20	Milan	0–0	Sampdoria	Milan
		Report		Stadium: Stadio San Siro; Attendance: 32,173; Referee: Giunti

12 March 1972 21	Cagliari	2–1	Milan	Cagliari
	Gori 6'; Riva 87' (pen.)	Report	47' Bigon	Stadium: Stadio Sant'Elia; Attendance: 46,184; Referee: Michelotti

19 March 1972 22	Milan	1–1	Inter Milan	Milan
	Benetti 53'	Report	84' Boninsegna	Stadium: Stadio San Siro; Attendance: 77,995; Referee: Angonese

26 March 1972 23	Mantova	0–0	Milan	Mantova
		Report		Stadium: Stadio Danilo Martelli; Attendance: 14,755; Referee: Francescon

2 April 1972 24	Milan	1–0	Bologna	Milan
	Golin 46'	Report		Stadium: Stadio San Siro; Attendance: 38,141; Referee: Pieroni

9 April 1972 25	Roma	1–2	Milan	Rome
	Cappellini 45'	Report	47' Bigon; 64' Golin	Stadium: Stadio Olimpico; Attendance: 65,535; Referee: Angonese

16 April 1972 26	Hellas Verona	1–1	Milan	Verona
	Mariani 51'	Report	37' Bigon	Stadium: Stadio Marcantonio Bentegodi; Attendance: 27,495; Referee: Pieroni

23 April 1972 27	Milan	1–0	Torino	Milan
	Benetti 46' (pen.)	Report		Stadium: Stadio San Siro; Attendance: 61,432; Referee: Toselli

7 May 1972 28	Milan	3–0	Napoli	Milan
	Prati 14'; Villa 50'; Biasiolo 58'	Report		Stadium: Stadio San Siro; Attendance: 43,637; Referee: Angonese

21 May 1972 29	Atalanta	0–1	Milan	Bergamo
		Report	55' Bigon	Stadium: Stadio Comunale; Attendance: 20,592; Referee: Giunti

28 May 1972 30	Milan	1–0	Catanzaro	Milan
	Bigon 23'	Report		Stadium: Stadio San Siro; Attendance: 44,281; Referee: Pieroni

=== Coppa Italia ===
==== First round ====
Pos	Team	Pld	W	D	L	GF	GA	GD	Pts
1	Milan	4	3	1	0	6	1	+5	7
2	Mantova	4	2	0	2	5	5	0	4
3	Novara	4	2	0	2	4	5	−1	4
4	Catania	4	1	1	2	3	5	−2	3
5	Monza	4	1	0	3	3	5	−2	2

29 August 1971 1	Monza	0–1	Milan	Monza
			14' Prati	Stadium: Stadio Gino Alfonso Sada; Attendance: 11,500; Referee: Gussoni

8 September 1971 2	Milan	2–0	Novara	Milan
	Biasiolo 40'; Bigon 42'			Stadium: Stadio San Siro; Attendance: 19,150; Referee: Ciacci

12 September 1971 3	Milan	2–0	Mantova	Milan
	Prati 6'; Bigon 54'			Stadium: Stadio San Siro; Attendance: 21,102; Referee: Giunti

19 September 1971 4	Catania	1–1	Milan	Catania
	Baisi 47'		79' Prati	Stadium: Stadio Cibali; Attendance: 12,841; Referee: Toselli

==== Second round ====
Pos	Team	Pld	W	D	L	GF	GA	GD	Pts	ACM	TOR	INT	JUV
1	Milan	6	4	2	0	7	3	+4	10	—	1–1	1–0	3–2
2	Torino	6	2	2	2	5	7	−2	6	0–0	—	1–0	2–1
3	Internazionale	6	2	0	4	7	6	+1	4	0–1	3–0	—	3–1
4	Juventus	6	2	0	4	8	11	−3	4	0–1	2–1	2–1	—

Source: historical-lineups.com

4 June 1972 1	Torino	0–0	Milan	Turin
				Stadium: Stadio Comunale; Attendance: 23,706; Referee: Menegali

7 June 1972 2	Milan	1–0	Inter Milan	Milan
	Sabadini 43'			Stadium: Stadio San Siro; Attendance: 37,860; Referee: Gonella

11 June 1972 3	Juventus	0–1	Milan	Turin
			27' Prati	Stadium: Stadio Comunale; Attendance: 7,675; Referee: Toselli

25 June 1972 4	Milan	1–1	Torino	Milan
	Benetti 68' (pem.)		25' Puia	Stadium: Stadio San Siro; Attendance: 14,994; Referee: Pieroni

28 June 1972 5	Inter Milan	0–1	Milan	Milan
			28' Bigon	Stadium: Stadio San Siro; Attendance: 26,307; Referee: Bernardis

1 July 1972 6	Milan	3–2	Juventus	Milan
	Rivera 13' (pen.), 73'; Piloni 18' (o.g.)		34' Novellini; 44' Haller	Stadium: Stadio San Siro; Attendance: 50,000; Referee: Giunti

==== Final ====
5 July 1972	Milan	2–0	Napoli	Rome
	Panzanato 49' (o.g.); Rosato 78'			Stadium: Stadio Olimpico; Attendance: 50,745; Referee: Toselli

=== Coppa UEFA ===
==== Round of 64 ====
22 September 1971 1	Milan	4–0	Digenis Akritas Morphou	Milan
	Villa 32', 60'; Magherini 34'; Golin 50'	Report		Stadium: Stadio San Siro; Attendance: 9,826; Referee: Cassar Naudi

29 September 1971 2	Digenis Akritas Morphou	0–3	Milan	Trieste
		Report	11', 77' Villa; 65' Rivera	Stadium: Stadio Giuseppe Grezar; Attendance: 15,000; Referee: Stavrev

==== Round of 32 ====
20 October 1971 1	Milan	4–2	Hertha Berlin	Milan
	Prati 41', 85'; Benetti 62'; Biasiolo 65'	Report	15' Steffenhagen; 51' Beer	Stadium: Stadio San Siro; Attendance: 16,633; Referee: Marschall

3 November 1971 2	Hertha Berlin	2–1	Milan	Berlino Ovest
	Horr 15' (pen.), 89'	Report	13' Bigon	Stadium: Olympiastadion; Attendance: 25,000; Referee: Carpenter

==== Round of 16 ====
24 November 1971 2	Milan	3–0	Dundee	Milan
	Rivera 14'; Stewart 50' (o.g.); Benetti 71'	Report		Stadium: Stadio San Siro; Attendance: 14,230; Referee: Michas

8 December 1971 2	Dundee	2–0	Milan	Dundee
	Wallace 39'; Duncan 74'	Report		Stadium: Dens Park; Attendance: 19,000; Referee: Wurtz

==== Quarterfinals ====
23 February 1972 1	Milan	2–0	Lierse	Milan
	Rivera 30' (pen.); Bigon 43'	Report		Stadium: Stadio San Siro; Attendance: 23,316; Referee: Babacan

7 March 1972 2	Lierse	1–1	Milan	Lier
	Vermeyen 86' (pen.)	Report	47' Villa	Stadium: Herman Vanderpoortenstadion; Attendance: 18,000; Referee: Ortiz de Mendibil

==== Semifinals ====
5 April 1972 1	Tottenham	2–1	Milan	Londra
	Perryman 33', 64'	Report	25' Benetti	Stadium: White Hart Lane; Attendance: 50,000; Referee: Medina

19 April 1972 2	Milan	1–1	Tottenham	Milan
	Rivera 69' (pen.)	Report	7' Mullery	Stadium: Stadio San Siro; Attendance: 68,492; Referee: Loraux

== Statistics ==
=== Squad statistics ===
Competition	Points	Home						Away						Total						GD
Competition	Points	G	W	D	L	Gs	Ga	G	W	D	L	Gs	Ga	G	W	D	L	Gs	Ga	GD
1971-72 Serie A	42	15	9	4	2	20	8	15	7	6	2	16	9	30	16	10	4	36	17	+19
1971-72 Coppa Italia	–	5	4	1	0	9	3	5	3	2	0	4	1	11	8	3	0	15	4	+11
1971-72 UEFA Cup	–	5	4	1	0	14	3	5	1	1	3	6	7	10	5	2	3	20	10	+10
Total	–	25	17	6	2	43	14	25	11	9	5	26	17	51	29	15	7	71	31	+40

=== Players statistics ===
No.	Pos	Nat	Player	Total		Serie A		Coppa Italia		UEFA Cup	
No.	Pos	Nat	Player	Apps	Goals	Apps	Goals	Apps	Goals	Apps	Goals
	DF	(Italy) ITA	Angelo Anquilletti	48	0	28	0	10	0	10	0
	DF	(Italy) ITA	Cesare Cattaneo	0	0	0	0	0	0	0	0
	GK	(Italy) ITA	Pierangelo Belli	0	0	0	-0	0	-0	0	-0
	MF	(Italy) ITA	Giuseppe Sabadini	50	1	29	0	11	1	10	0
	GK	(Italy) ITA	Fabio Cudicini	50	-29	30	-17	10	-2	10	-10
	MF	(Italy) ITA	Giorgio Biasiolo	34	3	20	1	8	1	6	1
	MF	(Italy) ITA	Guido Magherini	9	1	2	0	6	0	1	1
	FW	(Italy) ITA	Lino Golin	21	3	9	2	7	0	5	1
	MF	(Italy) ITA	Pier Paolo Scarrone	7	0	2	0	3	0	2	0
	FW	(Italy) ITA	Alberto Bigon	48	19	29	14	11	3	8	2
	MF	(Italy) ITA	Vincenzo Zazzaro	16	0	11	0	0	0	5	0
	DF	(Italy) ITA	Romeo Benetti	45	8	29	4	7	1	9	3
	DF	(Italy) ITA	Luigi Maldera	4	0	0	0	1	0	3	0
	DF	(Italy) ITA	Giulio Zignoli	35	0	20	0	7	0	8	0
	FW	(Italy) ITA	Pierino Prati	39	12	21	6	11	4	7	2
	MF	(Italy) ITA	Gianni Rivera	37	9	23	3	6	2	8	4
	DF	(Italy) ITA	Aldo Maldera	4	0	0	0	1	0	3	0
	FW	(Italy) ITA	Silvano Villa	30	9	18	4	5	0	7	5
	DF	(Germany) GER	Karl-Heinz Schnellinger	45	0	26	0	10	0	9	0
	MF	(Italy) ITA	Riccardo Sogliano	44	1	28	1	9	0	7	0
	MF	(Italy) ITA	Luciano Monticolo	2	0	1	0	1	0	0	0
	FW	(Italy) ITA	Carlo Tresoldi	1	0	0	0	1	0	0	0
	GK	(Italy) ITA	Villiam Vecchi	2	-2	1	-0	1	-2	0	0

== See also ==
- A.C. Milan

== Bibliography ==
- Panini (ed.). Almanacco illustrato del Milan, ed: 2, March 2005.
- Enrico Tosi. La storia del Milan, May 2005. Italia/Italy cid Tosi.
- Milan. Sempre con te, December 2009. Mondadori. 2009. ISBN 978-88-04-59118-4.
