= 1964 Coppa Italia final =

16th Coppa Italia final
- Event: 1963–64 Coppa Italia
Roma	Torino
1	0

Final
Roma	Torino
0	0
- After extra time
- Date: 6 September 1964
- Venue: Stadio Olimpico, Rome
- Referee: Giulio Campanati

Replay Final
Torino	Roma
0	1
- Date: 1 November 1964
- Venue: Stadio Olimpico, Turin
- Referee: Giulio Campanati

The 1964 Coppa Italia final was the final of the 1963-64 Coppa Italia. The match was played on 6 September 1964 between Roma and Torino. Since the match ended 0–0, a replay of the final was played on 1 November 1964 in Turin, where Roma won 1–0.

== Final ==
6 September 1964

Roma	0–0 (a.e.t.)	Torino

Stadio Olimpico, Rome
Referee: Giulio Campanati

Roma	Torino

GK	1	(Italy) Enzo Matteucci
DF	2	(Italy) Mario Ardizzon
DF	3	(Italy) Francesco Carpenetti
DF	4	(Italy) Giacomo Losi
DF	5	(Italy) Glauco Tomasin
DF	6	(Germany) Karl-Heinz Schnellinger
MF	7	(Italy) Sergio Carpanesi
MF	8	(Italy) Giuseppe Tamborini
MF	9	(Italy) Bruno Nicolè
MF	10	(Italy) Elvio Salvori
CF	11	(Italy) Lamberto Leonardi
Manager:
(Argentina) Juan Carlos Lorenzo

GK	1	(Italy) Lido Vieri
DF	2	(Italy) Fabrizio Poletti
DF	3	(Italy) Giorgio Puia
DF	4	(Italy) Roberto Rosato
DF	5	(Italy) Luciano Teneggi
MF	6	(Italy) Amilcare Ferretti
MF	7	(Italy) Giorgio Ferrini
MF	8	(Italy) Giambattista Moschino
FW	9	(Italy) Enrico Albrigi
CF	10	(England) Gerry Hitchens
FW	11	(Italy) Gigi Meroni
Manager:
(Italy) Nereo Rocco

== Replay Final ==
1 November 1964

Torino	0–1	Roma
		Nicolé 85'

Stadio Olimpico, Turin
Referee: Giulio Campanati

Torino	Roma

GK	1	(Italy) Lido Vieri
DF	2	(Italy) Luciano Buzzacchera
DF	3	(Italy) Giancarlo Cella
DF	4	(Italy) Remo Lancioni
DF	5	(Italy) Fabrizio Poletti
DF	6	(Italy) Giorgio Puia
MF	7	(Italy) Amilcare Ferretti
MF	8	(Italy) Giorgio Ferrini
AM	9	(Italy) Luigi Simoni
CF	10	(England) Gerry Hitchens
CF	11	(Italy) Gigi Meroni
Manager:
(Italy) Nereo Rocco

GK	1	(Italy) Fabio Cudicini
DF	2	(Italy) Mario Ardizzon
DF	3	(Italy) Giacomo Losi
DF	4	(Germany) Karl-Heinz Schnellinger
DF	5	(Italy) Glauco Tomasin
MF	6	(Italy) Sergio Carpanesi
MF	7	(Italy) Giancarlo De Sisti
MF	8	(Italy) Giuseppe Tamborini
CF	9	(Italy) Fulvio Francesconi
CF	10	(Italy) Lamberto Leonardi
FW	11	(Italy) Bruno Nicolè
Manager:
(Argentina) Juan Carlos Lorenzo
