= Maldera =

Maldera is a surname. Notable people with the surname include:

- Aldo Maldera (1953–2012), Italian footballer
- Luigi Maldera (1946–2021), Italian footballer and coach
