= Tamborini =

Tamborini is an Italian surname. Notable people with the surname include:

- Giuseppe Tamborini (born 1943), Italian footballer
- José Tamborini (1886–1955), Argentine physician and politician

== See also ==
- Massimo Tamburini (1943–2014), Italian motorcycle designer
