= Francesco Carpenetti =

Italian footballer

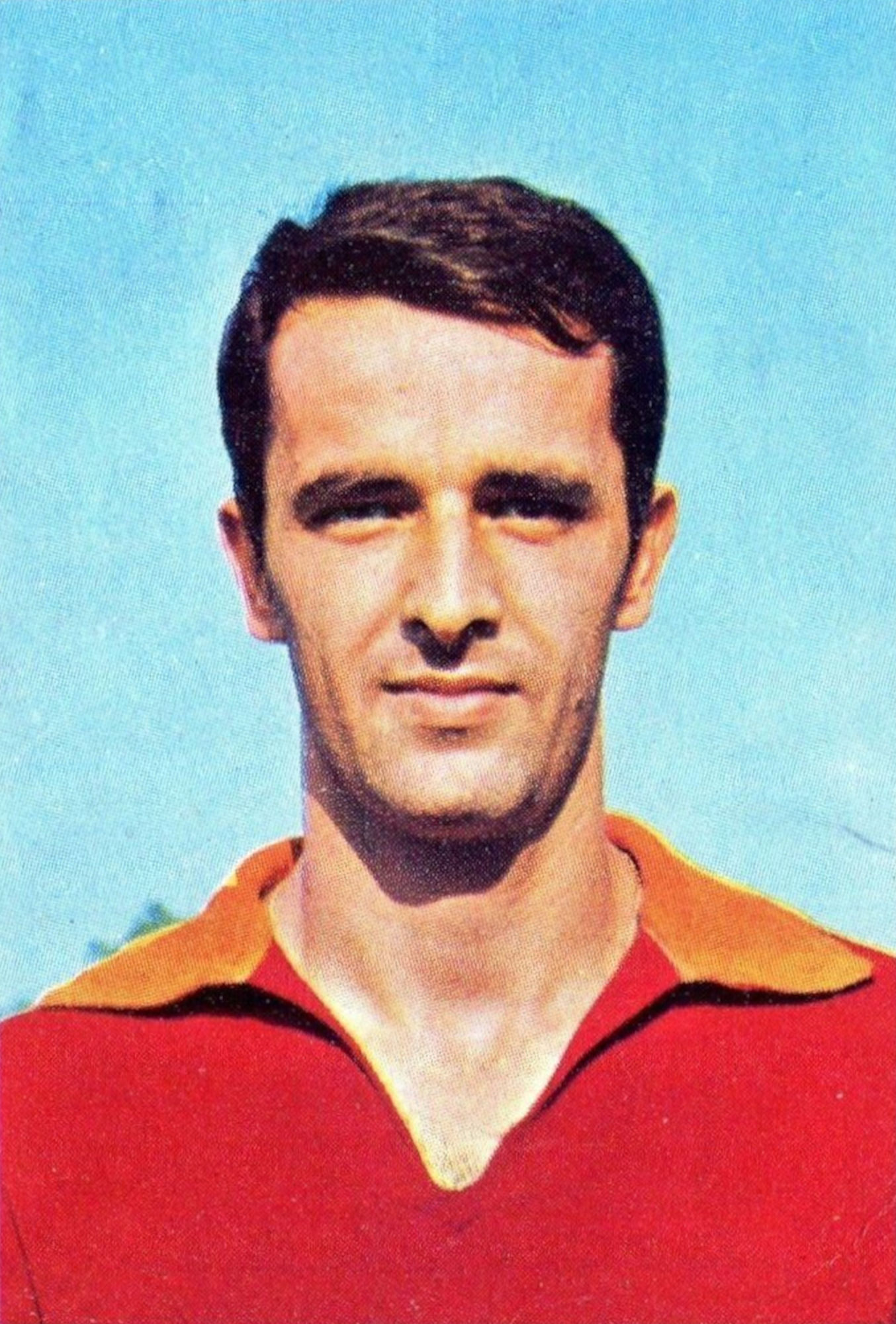
- Carpenetti with Roma in 1965

Personal information
- Date of birth: 4 October 1942 (age 84)
- Place of birth: Orsera, Istria, Kingdom of Italy
- Height: 1.82 m (5 ft 11 1/2 in)
- Position: Defender

Senior career*
| Years | Team | Apps | (Gls) |
| 1962–1963 | Triestina | 0 | (0) |
| 1963–1969 | Roma | 130 | (3) |
| 1969–1971 | Fiorentina | 12 | (0) |
| 1971–1976 | Grosseto | 147 | (3) |
- * Club domestic league appearances and goals

Francesco Carpenetti (born 4 October 1942) is a retired Italian professional football player.

He played for 8 seasons (142 games, 3 goals) in the Serie A for A.S. Roma and ACF Fiorentina. During his time at the Capitoline club, the giallorossi won the Coppa Italia twice, also thanks to his contribution.

After his stint at Fiorentina (with whom he also played in the European Cup), he moved to Grosseto, where he ended his career as a player and started his career as a coach. He conquered the 1972–73 Serie D with Grosseto as a player, thus gaining promotion to the Serie C.

== Biography ==
=== Playing career ===
Francesco Carpenetti was born on 4 October 1942 in Orsera, Istria, Kingdom of Italy. He started playing in the youth sectors of Triestina, and in 1959 joined Roma in Serie A. He continued his growth in the youth sector of Roma, with whom he was twice junior Italian champion, winning the first youth championship (Campionato Juniores Professionisti, later renamed Campionato Primavera) under Géza Boldizsár and the second under Guido Masetti. He was called up to the first squad by Alfredo Foni in 1961, debuting with the first team in a friendly against OFK Beograd on 8 November 1961. His official debut came after Roma had changed coach. Under new coach Luis Miró he debuted against Juventus in the Serie A on 4 March 1964. Although they lost 2–1 to the Turin team, Juventus' midfielder Nené exited the field shaking the hand of young Carpenetti, his defensive marker in this game. Though he missed the 1964 pre-season due to compulsory military service, new coach Juan Carlos Lorenzo immediately decided to rely on him, and young Carpenetti was fielded as a starter in the first leg of the 1963–64 Coppa Italia final against Torino, in which Roma kept a clean sheet, with Carpenetti being praised for his performance in this game. Carpenetti then started playing ever more, up to becoming a "staple of the Roma defense". In 1969 he won his second Coppa Italia with Roma (as well as the second Coppa Italia in the club's history) playing as a starter in Roma's victory in Foggia, with which they conquered the trophy.

He played for Roma for seven seasons, totalling 130 appearances and scoring 3 goals in the league. During his time at Roma, the Capitoline club won the Coppa Italia twice, also thanks to his contribution.

In 1969 he moved to Fiorentina. He debuted with Fiorentina on 7 December 1969, in a Serie A game against Inter. He played with the gigliati for two seasons, during which he also played in the European Cup (now Champions League). With Fiorentina he totalled 16 caps in all competitions.

In 1971 he moved to Serie D club Grosseto, where, once he gained promotion to the Serie C at the end of the 1972–73 season, he remained until his retirement, which took place at the end of the 1975–76 season. Carpenetti played a total of 183 matches for Grosseto, scoring 10 goals.

=== Coaching career ===
Once he hung up his boots, he became a coach, managing his last club as a player, Grosseto, in two distinct periods, first in Serie C2 (1979) and later, in 1987, in the Campionato Interregionale.

== Style of play ==
Carpenetti was a "very physically gifted player", as well as good on the ball. Because of the latter, he was often employed also as a mediano, especially under coach Oronzo Pugliese. 180 cm tall, he was also gifted with an exceptional elevation ability, which allowed him to clear the area from opponents' crosses. Carpenetti, described as a jolly (lit. joker, i.e. a player who can play in several positions), was also appreciated for his ductility.

== Honours ==
Roma

- Coppa Italia: 1963–64, 1968–69

Grosseto

- Serie D: 1972–73
