= Andrea Maldera =

Italian football coach (born 1971)

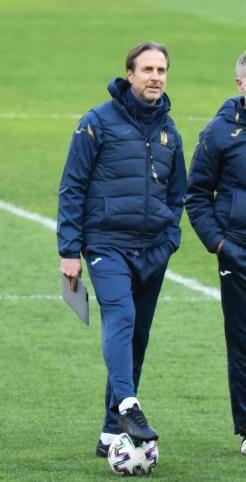
- Maldera as assistant coach of Ukraine in 2021

Personal information
- Full name: Andrea Maldera
- Date of birth: 18 May 1971 (age 55)
- Place of birth: Milan, Italy

Team information
- Current team: Ukraine (manager)

Managerial career
- Years: Team
- 2006–2008: AC Milan Youth Sector (assistant)
- 2009–2015: AC Milan (assistant)
- 2015–2016: AC Milan Youth Sector (assistant)
- 2016–2021: Ukraine (assistant)
- 2022–2024: Brighton & Hove Albion (assistant)
- 2024–2026: Marseille (assistant)
- 2026–: Ukraine

Andrea Maldera (born 18 May 1971) is an Italian football coach, assistant head coach and specialist in tactical and technical analysis. Currently he is head coach of the Ukraine national team.

== Career ==
Maldera has worked in the structure of Serie A giants AC Milan, in the coaching staff of the Ukraine national team under the leadership of Andriy Shevchenko (2016–2021), as well as in the staffs of Roberto De Zerbi, first at English Premier League club Brighton & Hove Albion (2022–2024) and then at French Ligue 1 club Marseille (2024–2026).

Since 18 May 2026, he is head coach of the Ukraine national football team. Maldera is Ukraine's first ever foreign national team coach.

== Personal life ==
Maldera is son of Luigi Maldera and nephew of Aldo Maldera and Attilio Maldera. He is married to journalist Benedetta Radaelli of Sport Mediaset.

He is graduated from the Università Cattolica del Sacro Cuore.
