= Glauco Tomasin =

Italian footballer and manager

Personal information
- Date of birth: October 14, 1939 (age 87)
- Place of birth: Udine, Italy
- Height: 1.68 m (5 ft 6 in)
- Position: Defender

Senior career*
Years	Team	Apps	(Gls)
1955–1964	Sampdoria	92	(1)
1964–1966	Roma	42	(1)
1966–1969	SPAL	83	(0)

Managerial career
- 1973–1974: Lavello
- 1974–1975: Manfredonia
- 1975–1976: Lavello
- 1976–1977: Formia
- 1978–1980: Russi
- * Club domestic league appearances and goals

Glauco Tomasin (born October 14, 1939) is a retired Italian professional football player and coach.

== Career ==
He played 9 seasons (192 games, 2 goals) in the Serie A for U.C. Sampdoria, A.S. Roma and SPAL 1907.

Tomasin played for Sampdoria from 1958 to 1964, and for SPAL from 1966 to 1969.
