= 1963–64 Coppa Italia =

Italian Football Federation domestic cup competition

Tournament details
- Country: Italy
- Dates: 9 Sept 1963 – 1 Nov 1964
- Teams: 38

Final positions
- Champions: Roma (1st title)
- Runners-up: Torino

Tournament statistics
- Matches played: 38
- Goals scored: 100 (2.63 per match)
- Top goal scorer(s): Juan Seminario; Kurt Hamrin (4 goals)

The 1963–64 Coppa Italia, the 17th Coppa Italia was an Italian Football Federation domestic cup competition won by Roma.

== First round ==
Home team	Score	Away team
Alessandria	1-1 (aet) *	Vicenza
Varese	1-0	Pro Patria
Brescia	2-3	Genoa
Lecco	1-3	Torino
Padova	2-1 (aet)	Modena
Venezia	1-2	Monza
Triestina	0-2	SPAL
Udinese	0-2	Bologna
Hellas Verona	2-1	Mantova
Prato	2-0	Sampdoria
Parma	3-1	Cosenza
Napoli	1-0	Bari
Potenza	0-2	Roma
Cagliari	1-0	Lazio
Foggia	2-1	Catania
Catanzaro	3-1	Messina
Palermo	0-3	Fiorentina

* Alessandria qualify after drawing of lots.

== Intermediate round ==
Home team	Score	Away team
Varese	3-0	Monza

== Second round ==
Home team	Score	Away team
Alessandria	0-0 (p: 3–4)	Genoa
Hellas Verona	0-1 (aet)	Bologna
Padova	2-2 (p: 2–4)	SPAL
Parma	1-2	Cagliari
Fiorentina	4-1	Prato
Roma	5-0	Napoli
Catanzaro	1-2	Foggia
Torino	2-1	Varese

p=after penalty shoot-out

== Third round ==
Home team	Score	Away team
Genoa	1-1 (p:4-5)	Torino
Cagliari	0-1	Fiorentina
Foggia	0-2	Roma
Bologna	4-2	SPAL

p=after penalty shoot-out

== Quarter-finals ==
Milan, Atalanta, Juventus and Internazionale are added.

Home team	Score	Away team
Fiorentina	1-0	Milan
Roma	1-0	Atalanta
Juventus	4-1	Bologna
Torino	4-1	Internazionale

== Semi-finals ==
Home team	Score	Away team
Roma	1-1 (p: 6–2)	Fiorentina
Torino	2-0	Juventus

p=after penalty shoot-out

== Final ==
6 September 1964

Roma	0–0 (a.e.t.)	Torino

Stadio Olimpico, Rome
Referee: Giulio Campanati

Note: The registration deadline for UEFA competitions was after the first match. As the match ended in a draw, there was a need for a replay match, which were to take place after the deadline. Therefore, FIGC faced the decision of "betting" on one of the teams to win the cup and nominating it to participate in the Cup Winners' Cup. FIGC decided to nominate Torino, but eventually Roma went on to win the Coppa Italia, so the FIGC nominated them for the Fairs Cup as a compensation for its wrong bet.

=== Replay ===
1 November 1964

Torino	0–1	Roma
		Nicolé 85'

Stadio Olimpico, Turin
Referee: Giulio Campanati

== Top goalscorers ==
Rank	Player	Club	Goals
1	(Peru) Juan Seminario	Fiorentina	4
1	(Sweden) Kurt Hamrin	Fiorentina	4
3	(Argentina) Pedro Waldemar Manfredini	Roma	3
3	(Italy) Lamberto Leonardi	Roma	3
3	(Italy) Alberto Orlando	Roma	3
3	(Spain) Joaquín Peiró	Torino	3
