= Adriano Fedele =

Italian footballer and coach (born 1947)

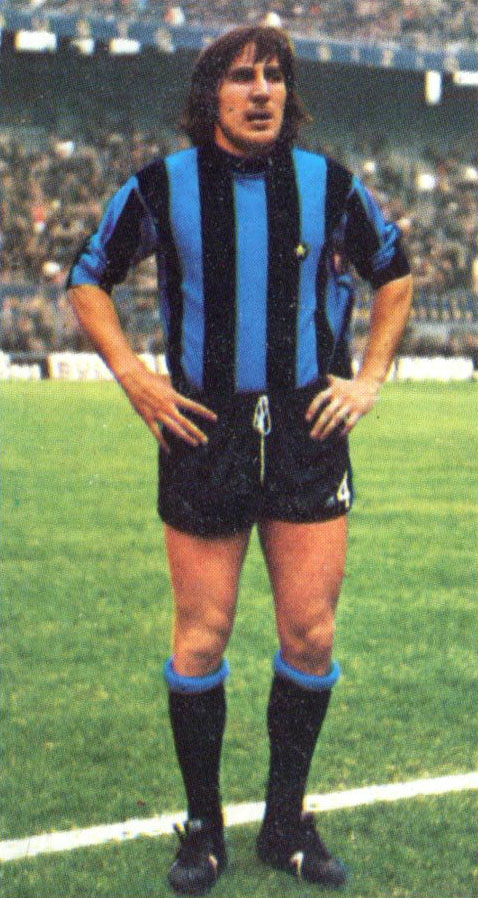
- Fedele with Inter Milan in 1974

Personal information
- Date of birth: 13 October 1947 (age 79)
- Place of birth: Udine, Italy
- Height: 1.73 m (5 ft 8 in)
- Positions: Defender; midfielder

Senior career*
Years	Team	Apps	(Gls)
1964–1970	Udinese	154	(7)
1970–1973	Bologna	77	(7)
1973–1979	Internazionale	132	(10)
1979–1983	Verona	95	(0)
1983–1985	Pordenone	54	(3)
1985–1986	Pro Gorizia	29	(0)

Managerial career
- 1987–1988: Pordenone
- 1988–1989: Novara
- 1992–1995: Udinese
- 1996–1997: Padova
- 1997–1998: Modena
- 1998–1999: Padova
- 2002–2003: Pordenone
- * Club domestic league appearances and goals

Adriano Fedele (born 13 October 1947) is an Italian professional football coach and a former player who played as a defender or midfielder.

During the 1998–1999 season of Serie C1, while coaching Padova during a match against Varese on April 3, 1999, Fedele mistakenly replaced with a young football player with an older football player, violating a rule that required at least one player under the age of 21 to be on the playing field during the match. This mistake, dubbed the "Amirante Affair", cost Padova the match and contributed to them placing fifth from last by the end of the season.

== Honours ==
Inter

- Coppa Italia winner: 1977–78.
