= Giacomo La Rosa =

Italian footballer

Personal information
- Date of birth: August 25, 1946 (age 80)
- Place of birth: Messina, Italy
- Height: 1.70 m (5 ft 7 in)
- Position: Striker

Senior career*
Years	Team	Apps	(Gls)
1965–1969	Messina	88	(19)
1969–1972	Roma	19	(4)
1972	Varese	6	(0)
1973	Lazio	6	(2)
1973–1975	Palermo	50	(21)
1975–1976	Catanzaro	17	(3)
1976	Brindisi	5	(1)
1976–1978	Pescara	37	(9)
1978–1979	Salernitana	19	(4)
1979–1980	Civitavecchia	27	(20)
1980–1982	Banco di Roma	57	(15)
- * Club domestic league appearances and goals

Giacomo La Rosa (born August 25, 1946 in Messina) is an Italian former professional footballer who played as a forward.

== Career ==
La Rosa played for five seasons in the Italian Serie A for A.S. Roma, S.S. Lazio and Delfino Pescara 1936, scoring seven goals in 33 league appearances.
