= Giulio Campanati =

Italian businessman and football referee

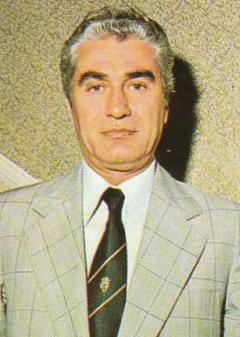
- Born: 12 June 1923; Milan, Kingdom of Italy
- Died: 30 October 2011 (aged 88); Milan, Italy
- Other occupation: Entrepreneur

Domestic
Years	League	Role
1952–1966	Serie A	Referee

International
Years	League	Role
1956–1966	FIFA-listed	Referee
1956–1966	UEFA	Referee

Giulio Campanati (12 June 1923 – 30 October 2011) was an Italian football referee.

He served as referee 166 times in Serie A between 1952 and 1966. He also refereed the 1964 Coppa Italia final. Campanati served as an international referee for both UEFA and FIFA for a decade. He also refeed the second leg of the 1962 Inter-Cities Fairs Cup final.

In 1960, Campanati was awarded the Giovanni Mauro Award as the best referee of the season.

In 1966, he became a referee administrator. He was President of the Italian Referees Association from 1972 to 1990.

In 2013, Campanati was posthumously inducted into the Italian Football Hall of Fame.

== Major matches refereed ==
Date	Match	Tournament	Venue	Result	Ref
12 September 1962	Barcelona vs. Valencia	1962 Inter-Cities Fairs Cup final (second leg)	Camp Nou, Barcelona	1–1 (3–7 on aggregate)	

== Honours ==
- Giovanni Mauro Award: 1960
- UEFA Order of Merit in Ruby: 2000
- Italian Football Hall of Fame: 2011
