= Giorgio Ferrini =

Italian footballer (1939–1976)

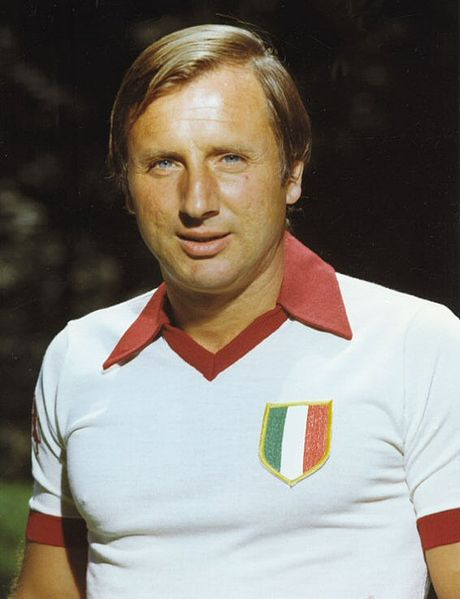
- Ferrini as assistant manager at Torino in 1976

Personal information
- Full name: Giorgio Ferrini
- Date of birth: 18 August 1939
- Place of birth: Trieste, Italy
- Date of death: 8 November 1976 (aged 37)
- Place of death: Turin, Italy
- Height: 1.76 m (5 ft 9 in)
- Position: Midfielder

Youth career
- 19??–1955: Ponziana
- 1955–1958: Torino

Senior career*
Years	Team	Apps	(Gls)
1958–1959	→ Varese (loan)	34	(10)
1959–1975	Torino	443	(42)
Total		477	(52)

International career
1960	Italy Olympic	3	(0)
1962–1968	Italy	7	(0)

Managerial career
- 1976: Torino (Assistant)
Medal record
Men's football
Representing Italy (as player)
UEFA European Championship
Winner	1968 Italy
- * Club domestic league appearances and goals

Giorgio Ferrini (Italian pronunciation: [ˈdʒordʒo ferˈriːni]; 18 August 1939 – 8 November 1976) was an Italian football manager and former football player who played as a midfielder.

Nicknamed La Diga ('The Dam') for his qualities as a defensive midfielder, Ferrini played for Torino from 1959 to 1975, and is the most capped player in the history of the Granata with 566 appearances in all competitions, ahead of Paolo Pulici (437). At club level, they won the Coppa Italia in 1967–68 and 1970–71. He also represented the Italy national team, winning the 1968 European Championship.

== Club career ==
Ferrini grew up in the youth team of Ponziana and in 1955 was signed by Torino and inserted in their youth system, where he stayed for three years. In 1957, he was auditioned by the national team manager Giuseppe Galluzzi in view of an international youth tournament.

On 11 August 1958, Ferrini was loaned to Varese in Serie C. In his only season with the biancorossi, he contributed ten goals to the salvation of the team, playing mainly as a starter. Ferrini played a wide midfielder position.

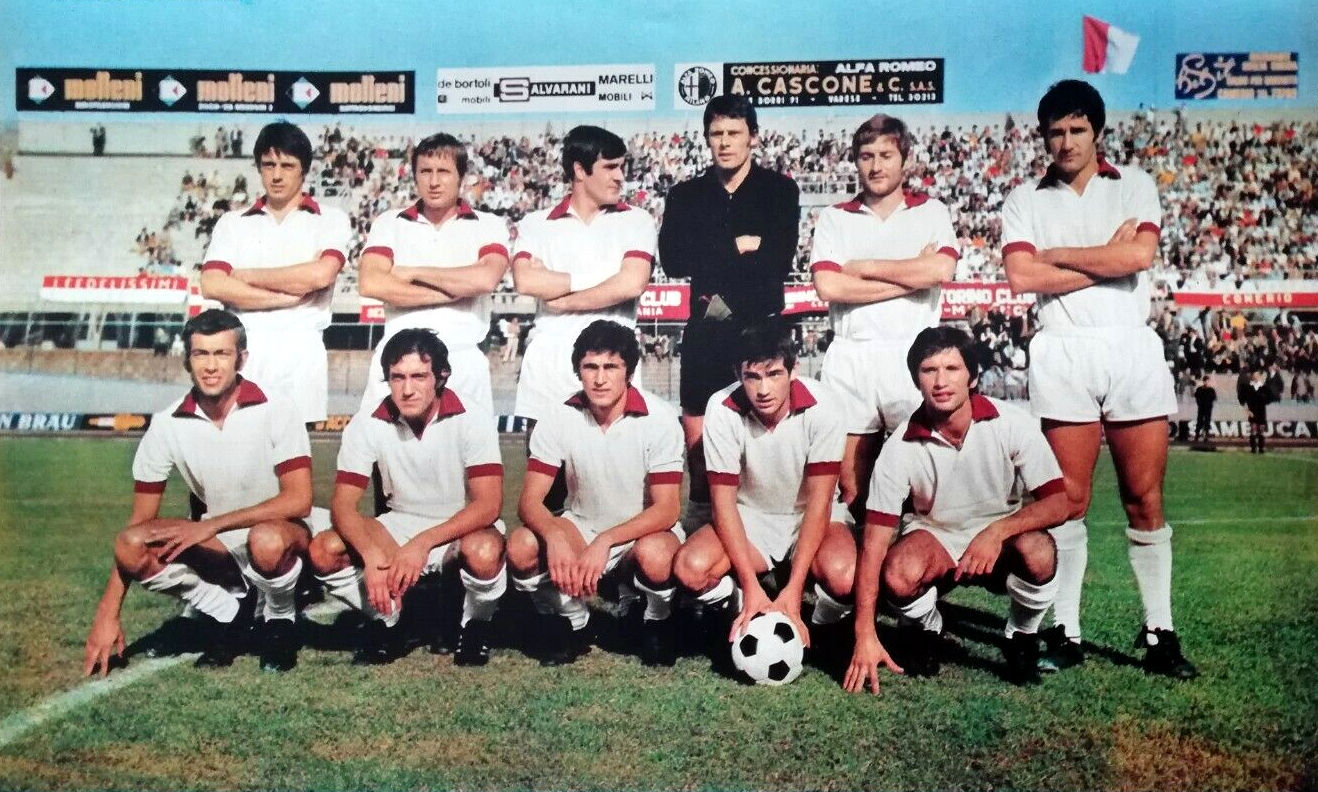
Ferrini (standing, second from the left) as Torino captain in 1970

Returning from loan, he contended his starting spot with Italo Mazzero in the midfield as the team were preparing to play in the Serie B. On 20 September 1959, he made his debut with Torino away to Sambenedettese (0–0) and the following week scored his first goal at home against Cagliari (5–0). He finished the season with 38 appearances and three goals, achieving direct promotion to Serie A and becoming fundamental to the club for his pace and determination.

In the following season, he was confirmed as a key player for Torino by the manager Benjamín Santos, and debuted in Serie A on 25 September 1960 in a loss to Sampdoria (0–1). Along with Remo Lancioni, he made the most appearances during the season, finishing 12th in the league.

He spent 16 seasons with Torino, becoming the club's most capped player in the top flight, with 39 goals scored in 405 appearances; in total, he made 566 appearances and scored 56 goals between the league, Coppa Italia and European competition. He won two Coppa Italia trophies, held in 1967–68 and 1970–71.

The last match he played was away against Napoli (1–0) on 22 June 1975, the last group match of the Coppa Italia in 1974–75.

== International career ==
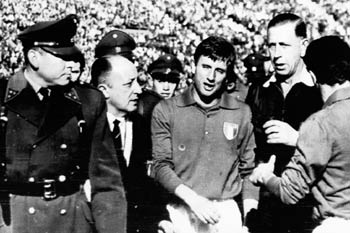
Ferrini being removed from the pitch by Carabineros de Chile policemen during Italy-Chile, 1962 FIFA World Cup

He was summoned by the national team manager Gipo Viani to represent the Azzurri, who finished in fourth place at the Olympic tournament held in Rome in 1960, playing three times.

Also in 1960, he was called up to the Nazionale di Lega della Serie A under-23 against the homologous team of the English League, which he entered in the 30th minute, replacing Giacomo Bulgarelli.

He was first called up to the Italy national team on 13 May 1962 against Belgium, on the eve of the FIFA World Cup in Chile. During the competition he is remembered as one of his team's protagonists, along with Mario David, against the hosts Chile, a match later colloquially known as the Battle of Santiago. After seven minutes, he was sent off by the English referee Ken Aston for a violent foul against the Chilean Honorino Landa. Ferrini refused to leave the ground, however, and continued to play until the police intervened to remove him from the field. Italy lost the match 2–0 and was eliminated in the first round of the tournament.

Unlike many Italian players from that World Cup, he returned to play for the national team, and his last game was the first of the final two games of the 1968 UEFA European Football Championship against Yugoslavia, played on 8 June 1968.

He played a total of seven matches with the Azzurri.

== Death ==
A few months after his retirement, while he served as assistant coach of Luigi Radice in the season in which Torino returned to win the Serie A title, he suffered two aneurysms (25 August and, after an initial recovery, 18 October 1976). Despite two surgical operations, he died on 8 November 1976, aged 37.

He is buried in the small cemetery hill of Pino Torinese, near Superga, where the Grande Torino side perished in the Superga air disaster.

== Honours ==
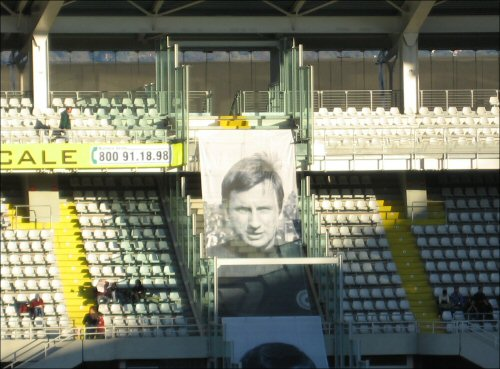
Stadio Olimpico: Ferrini is one of the most charismatic figures of the century-old history of Torino

=== Club ===
Torino

- Coppa Italia (2): 1967–68, 1970–71

=== International ===
Italy

- UEFA European Championship (1): 1968

=== Individual ===
- Torino FC Hall of Fame: 2014
