= Natalino Fossati =

Italian footballer and manager

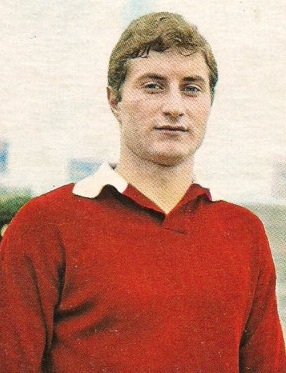
- Natalino Fossati with Torino

Personal information
- Date of birth: 23 June 1944
- Place of birth: Alessandria, Italy
- Height: 1.74 m (5 ft 9 in)
- Position: Full-back

Youth career
- Alessandria
- Torino

Senior career*
| Years | Team | Apps | (Gls) |
| 1963–1964 | Genoa | 23 | (1) |
| 1964–1974 | Torino | 250 | (9) |
| 1974–1976 | Sampdoria | 13 | (1) |
| 1976–1978 | Biellese | 45 | (7) |
| 1978 | Alessandria | 9 | (0) |

Managerial career
- 1981–1982: Sant'Angelo
- 1982–1983: Orbassano
- 1983–1984: Alessandria
- 1985: Pro Vercelli
- 1986–1987: Pistoiese
- 1987–1988: Saviglianese
- 1988–1989: Rondinella
- 1989–1990: Pontedera
- 1990–1991: Derthona
- 1991–1992: Aosta
- 1996–1997: Avezzano
- 2002–2005: Robbio
- * Club domestic league appearances and goals

Natalino Fossati (born 23 June 1944) is a former Italian professional footballer and manager who played as a full-back.

In 2016, he was inducted into Torino FC Hall of Fame.

== Career ==
=== Player ===
In his youth, Fossati played for Alessandria and Torino.

In 1963, he was bought by Genoa, where he debuted in Serie A. After one season, he went back to Torino, where he spent most of his career, making a total of 329 appearances, scoring 19 goals, and contributing to the victory of two Coppa Italia. He is the eight player with most appearances in the club's history.

He then spent two seasons at Sampdoria in Serie A and two seasons at Biellese in Serie C, before ending his career at Alessandria in 1978.

=== Manager ===
Fossati has coached a number of Italian teams, including Sant'Angelo, Orbassano, Alessandria, Pro Vercelli, Pistoiese, Saviglianese, Rondinella, Pontedera, Derthona, Aosta, Avezzano, and Robbio.

== Honours ==
=== Player ===
Torino

- Coppa Italia: 1967–68, 1970–71

=== Individual ===
- Torino FC Hall of Fame: 2016
