= Walter Franzot =

Italian association football player

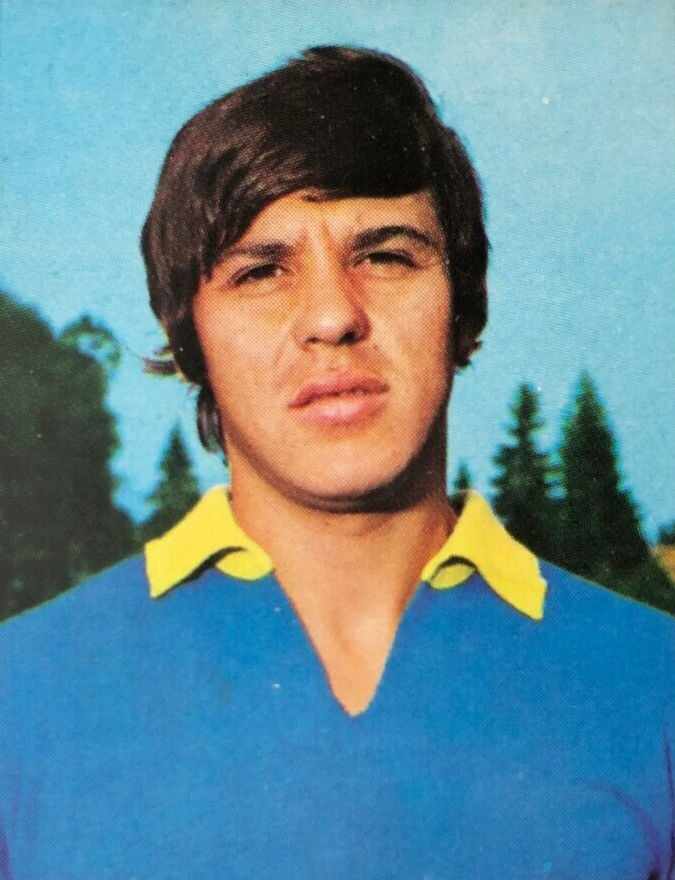
- Franzot with Verona in 1975

Personal information
- Date of birth: November 22, 1949 (age 76)
- Place of birth: Cervignano del Friuli, Italy
- Height: 1.72 m (5 ft 7 1/2 in)
- Position: Midfielder

Senior career*
Years	Team	Apps	(Gls)
1965–1966	Sangiorgina		
1966–1969	Udinese	38	(2)
1969–1973	Roma	75	(7)
1973–1981	Verona	171	(3)
1981–1984	Montebelluna	79	(0)

International career
1969–1971	Italy U-21	5	(0)
- * Club domestic league appearances and goals

Walter Franzot (born November 22, 1949) is a retired Italian professional footballer who played as a midfielder.

He played nine seasons (184 games, 8 goals) in the Serie A for Roma and Verona

He was born in Cervignano del Friuli.
