= Mario Ardizzon =

Italian footballer

Personal information
- Date of birth: 2 January 1938
- Place of birth: Chioggia, Italy
- Date of death: 27 November 2012 (aged 74)
- Place of death: Venice, Italy
- Height: 1.77 m (5 ft 9 1/2 in)
- Position: Defender

Senior career*
Years	Team	Apps	(Gls)
1957–1963	Venezia	142	(0)
1963–1966	Roma	92	(3)
1966–1971	Bologna	97	(0)
1971–1974	Venezia	73	(2)
- * Club domestic league appearances and goals

Mario Ardizzon (2 January 1938 – 30 November 2012) was an Italian footballer.

Ardizzon was born in Chioggia, and played 10 seasons (253 games, 3 goals) in the Serie A for S.S.C. Venezia, A.S. Roma and Bologna F.C. 1909. He died at age 74 in Venice.
