= Aldo Maldera =

Italian footballer (1953–2012)

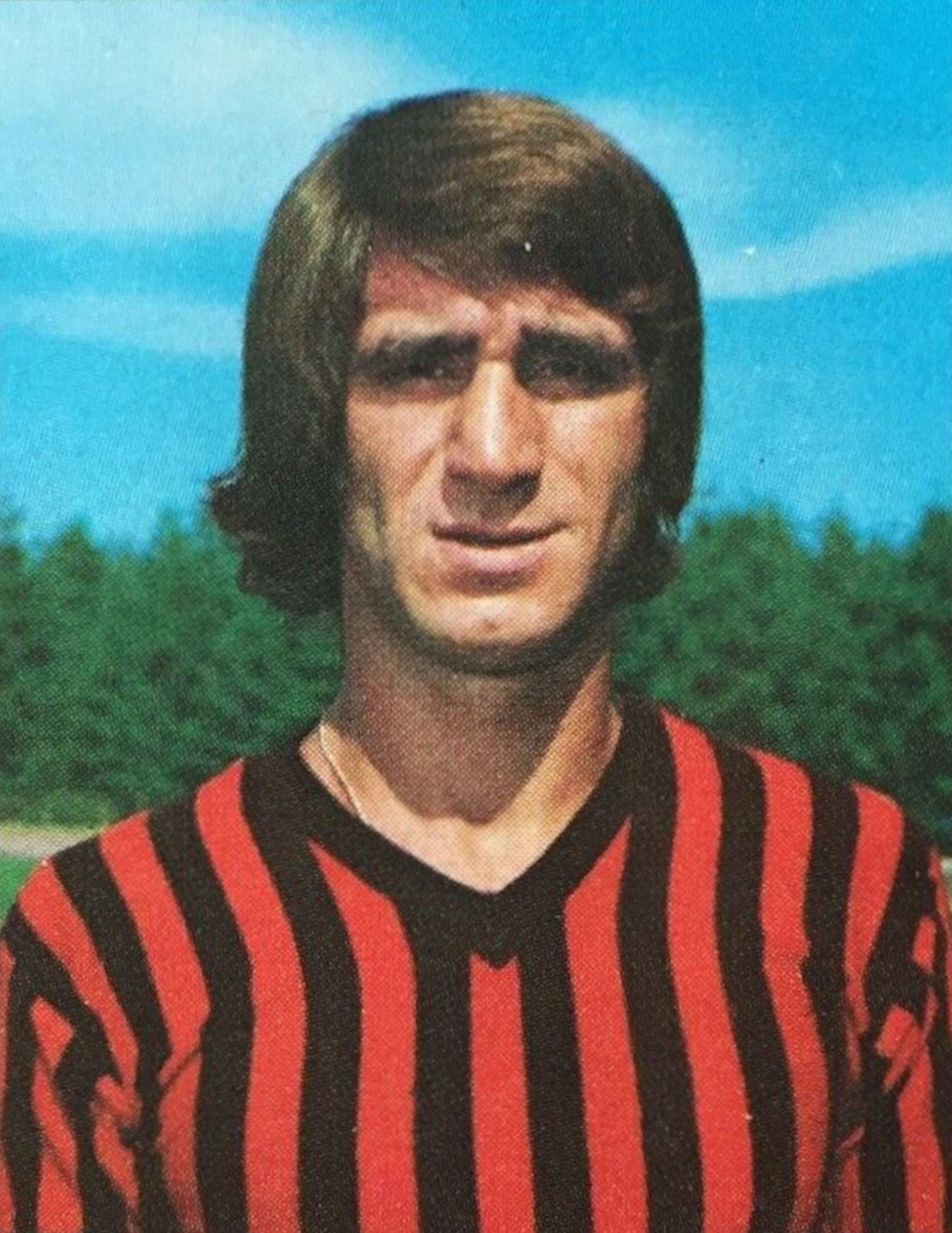
- Maldera with AC Milan in 1975

Personal information
- Full name: Aldo Maldera
- Date of birth: 14 October 1953
- Place of birth: Milan, Italy
- Date of death: 1 August 2012 (aged 58)
- Place of death: Rome, Italy
- Height: 1.80 m (5 ft 11 in)
- Position: Defender

Senior career*
Years	Team	Apps	(Gls)
1971–1972	Milan	1	(0)
1972–1973	Bologna	3	(0)
1973–1982	Milan	227	(30)
1982–1985	Roma	73	(6)
1985–1987	Fiorentina	18	(0)
1987–1988	Lucchese	0	(0)
Total		322	(36)

International career
1971	Italy U-21	1	(0)
1974–1980	Italy	10	(0)
- * Club domestic league appearances and goals

Aldo Maldera (Italian pronunciation: [ˈaldo malˈdɛːra]; 14 October 1953 – 1 August 2012) was an Italian footballer who played as a full-back or as a wide midfielder on the left flank.

Throughout his club career, he mainly played for Milan in Serie A, but also had a spell on loan with Bologna, and later played for Roma and Fiorentina, before ending his career with Lucchese.

At international level, Maldera represented the Italy national football team at the 1978 FIFA World Cup and UEFA Euro 1980, finishing in fourth place in both tournaments.

== Club career ==
Maldera was born in Milan, and he spent a large part of his career with one of the major local clubs of his city A.C. Milan (1971–1982); with the club, he won a Serie A title in 1979, two Coppa Italia trophies in 1972 and 1977, a Serie B title (earning promotion to Serie A the following season, following Milan's involvement in the 1980 Totonero football betting scandal) in 1981, and a Mitropa Cup, during his final season with the club, in 1982, also serving as the club's captain. Throughout his career, he also played for Bologna F.C. 1909 (for a half season loan, as a youth, during his time with Milan), local rivals Internazionale, A.S. Roma and A.C.F. Fiorentina.

Maldera won a total two Serie A titles throughout his career, at A.C. Milan and A.S. Roma respectively, both under the tutelage of manager Nils Liedholm. Maldera won his second career league title, with Roma, during the 1982–83 season, after leaving Milan following their relegation to Serie B at the conclusion of the 1981–82 season. Maldera this league victory up with a Coppa Italia with Roma in 1984, also reaching the European Cup final with Roma that season, only to lose out to Liverpool on penalties.

== International career ==
Maldera made 10 appearances for Italy between 1974 and 1980. He represented his country at the 1978 FIFA World Cup, and at Euro 1980 on home soil, where the Italy national side finished in fourth place on both occasions, reaching the semi-finals. He also made 9 appearances for the Italy reserve, B, side, and 1 appearance with the Italy national U21 side.

== Style of play ==
Maldera played as a full-back or as a wide midfielder on the left flank. A left-footed player, Maldera was a modern full-back who possessed an accurate and powerful shot, which earned him the nickname "Aldo-gol", due to his prolific goalscoring ability, despite his more defensive playing role; he was a hard-working team player, who was capable of covering the flank effectively and aiding his team both offensively and defensively. Throughout his career, he was known for his pace, stamina, technique, dribbling, and crossing ability; his speed and galloping offensive runs earned him the nickname "the horse".

== Personal life ==
Maldera was the third son of a family of Apulian immigrants in Milan. Aldo's older brothers Luigi Maldera and Attilio Maldera both played football professionally. To distinguish them, Luigi was referred to as Maldera I, Attilio as Maldera II and Aldo as Maldera III. His nephew is a football manager Andrea Maldera.

== After retirement ==
Following his retirement, he worked as a football agent, and he lived in Rome with his wife. He also worked as member of the A.S. Roma youth system until 2004, and later also as Sport director of Greek club Panionios F.C. with the president Zakiris and A.C. Milan's technical director Fabio Martella.

On 1 August 2012, it was announced on the A.S. Roma website that Maldera had died in Rome at the age of 58.

== Honours ==
AC Milan

- Serie A: 1978–79
- Serie B: 1980–81
- Coppa Italia: 1976–77
- Mitropa Cup: 1981–82

Roma

- Serie A: 1982–83
- Coppa Italia: 1983–84

Individual

- Serie A Team of The Year: 1983
- AC Milan Hall of Fame
