= Silvano Villa =

Italian footballer

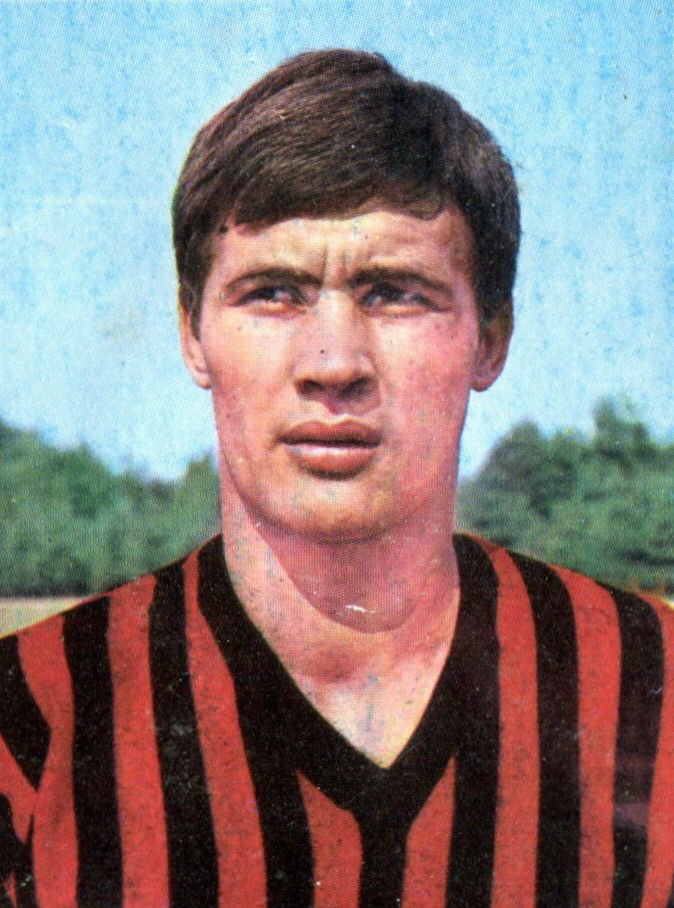
- Villa with Milan in 1971

Personal information
- Date of birth: August 13, 1951 (age 75)
- Place of birth: Villasanta, Italy
- Height: 1.74 m (5 ft 8 1/2 in)
- Position: Striker

Senior career*
Years	Team	Apps	(Gls)
1968–1972	Milan	38	(12)
1969–1970	→ Alessandria (loan)	30	(5)
1972–1973	Sampdoria	19	(0)
1973–1974	Foggia	29	(5)
1974–1975	Arezzo	28	(8)
1975–1976	Milan	3	(1)
1976–1977	Ascoli	37	(15)
1977–1978	Cagliari	20	(2)
1978–1979	Pistoiese	15	(1)
1979–1980	Civitanovese	19	(7)
1980–1982	Lucchese		
1982–1983	Derthona		

International career
1970–1971	Italy U-21	2	(0)
- * Club domestic league appearances and goals

Silvano Villa (born August 13, 1951 in Villasanta) is a retired Italian professional football player.

== Career ==
Villa began playing football with Milan but did not initially feature for the first team. After a loan spell with lower-level side Alessandria, he returned to Milan where he would make his Serie A debut against Foggia on 4 October 1970. He played 5 seasons (89 games, 18 goals) in the Serie A for A.C. Milan, U.C. Sampdoria and U.S. Foggia.

He scored 5 goals for A.C. Milan in the 1971–72 UEFA Cup.
