= Cesare Cattaneo =

Italian footballer and coach (born 1951)

Personal information
- Date of birth: 18 August 1951 (age 75)
- Place of birth: Verano Brianza, Italy
- Height: 1.81 m (5 ft 11 1/2 in)
- Position: Defender

Youth career
- Milan

Senior career*
Years	Team	Apps	(Gls)
1969–1971	Milan	2	(0)
1971–1972	Taranto	28	(1)
1972–1974	Como	70	(5)
1974–1975	Verona	27	(1)
1975–1977	Ternana	56	(2)
1977–1981	Avellino	116	(3)
1981–1985	Udinese	102	(3)
1985	Varese	5	(0)
1986	L.R. Vicenza	6	(0)

Managerial career
- 1998–1999: Voghera
- * Club domestic league appearances and goals

Cesare Cattaneo (born 18 August 1951) is an Italian professional football coach and a former player.

He played 9 seasons (187 games, 6 goals) in the Serie A for A.C. Milan, Avellino and Udinese Calcio.

His professional debut on 29 March 1970 for A.C. Milan was not a happy one, coach Nereo Rocco was forced to field Cattaneo in the game against Juventus FC after injuries to Karl-Heinz Schnellinger and Saul Malatrasi. Cattaneo was marking Pietro Anastasi, who had no problem with the 18-year-old defender and scored 2 goals in the 3-0 Juve win.
