= Angelo Cereser =

Italian footballer (born 1944)

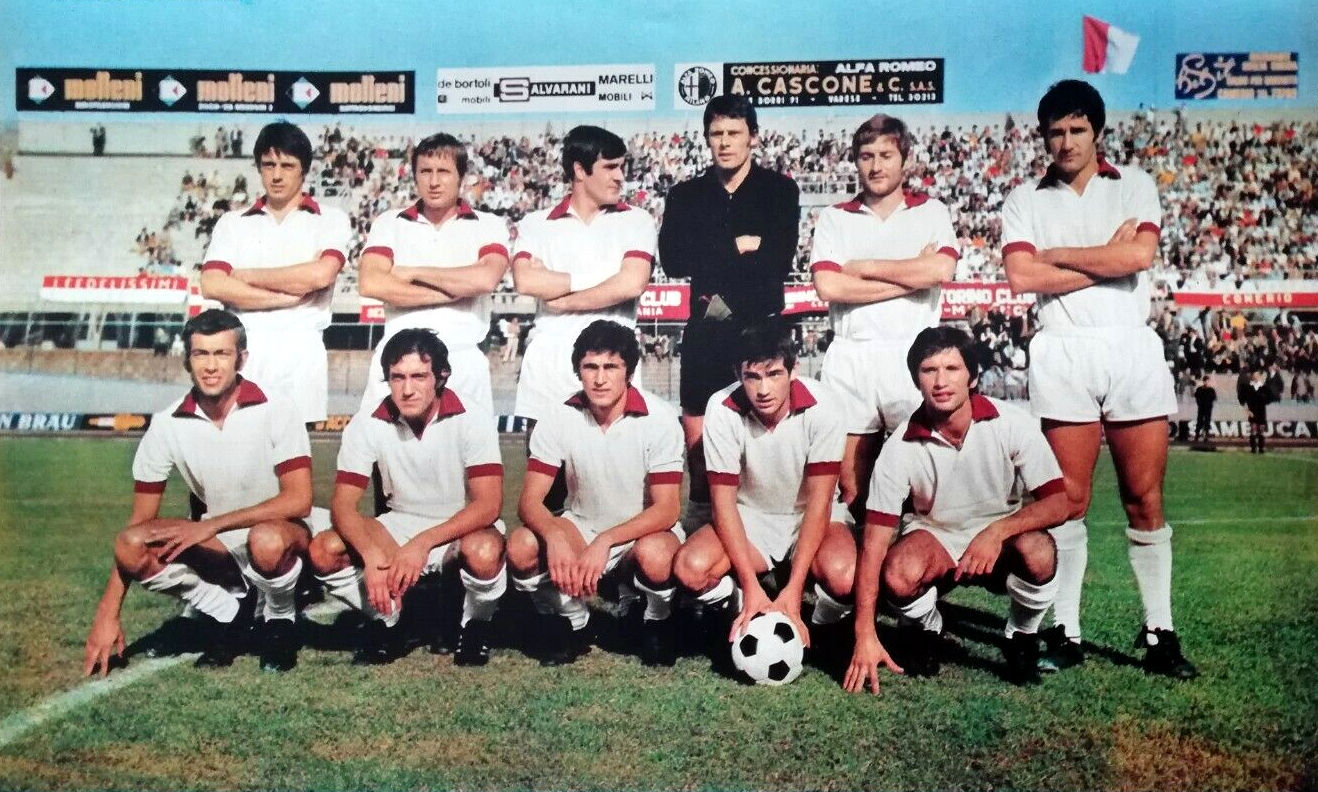
- Angelo Cereser (croached, third from left) with Torino

Personal information
- Date of birth: 6 April 1944 (age 82)
- Place of birth: Eraclea, Italy
- Height: 1.80 m (5 ft 11 in)
- Position: Defender

Youth career
- San Donà

Senior career*
Years	Team	Apps	(Gls)
1960–1962	San Donà	12	(0)
1962–1975	Torino	226	(5)
1975–1979	Bologna	50	(0)
- * Club domestic league appearances and goals

Angelo Cereser (Eraclea, born 6 April 1944) is a former Italian professional footballer who played as a defender.

== Club career ==
In his youth, Cereser played for San Donà. With San Donà, he made his debut in Serie D, making 12 appearances over two seasons.Other players who started their careers at San Donà with him include: Elvio Salvori, Enzo Ferrari and Gianfranco Bedin.

=== Torino ===
In 1962, he was signed by Torino, which at the time was recruiting young players in the Lombardy-Veneto region^{[4]}. After three years with the club's U21 and U19 teams, he was included in the squad for the 1965-1966 season. He made his debut on the 19th of September in the match Spal-Torino, which ended 0-0.

Cereser in action against Juventus during the 1968-1969 Serie A season. From left to right: Fabrizio Poletti, Angelo Cereser, Pietro Anastasi

His coach, Nereo Rocco, assigned him to man-mark opposing attackers. Cereser ended that season with 16 appearances. In the following season, however, he made 25 appearances, becoming a regular player for the team. In the 1967-68 season, coach Edmondo Fabbri took over the team and converted Cereser into a sweeper, a role he continued to play for the remainder of his career. That season was highlighted by the death of Luigi Meroni, and victory in the Coppa Italia.

In the 1968–69 season, he finished with 24 league appearances and made his debut in European Competition, in the UEFA Cup Winners' Cup on 18 September 1968 in the match between Partizani and Torino, which ended 1-0 to the home team. In the 1969-1970 season, he had already established himself as a regular starter for the squad, and in the following season he won the Coppa Italia again with Torino, defeating Milan on penalties in the Final. That year was also his highest-scoring year, as he scored 4 goals, including a brace in the derby on 21 May 1971.

In the 1971-1972 season, under coach Gustavo Giagnoni, the team came close to winning the league, finishing in 3rd place, one point from the title, which was ultimately won by Juventus. This was his last season at the highest level, as an ugly meniscus injury and a car accident caused him to skip almost the entirety of the following season. In the 1973-1974 season, he had a few misunderstandings and arguments with Giagnoni, who didn't believe Cereser could continue at a high level. He regained his role on the team at the end of that season. During the 1974-1975 season, Edmondo Fabbri came back to coach the team, but there were critics of Cereser, who was accused of being part of a clan composed of players from the team. He concluded his decade-long experience with the granata with 311 total appearances. He finished 11th all-time in appearances for the club.

=== Bologna ===
In the summer of 1975, Cereser signed for Bologna, where he played three more Serie A seasons. He retired from professional football in 1978.

== Style of play ==
Early in his career, he played as a goalkeeper. He changed positions due to his team's tactical needs, later playing as a center-back and then a sweeper.

Known for his aerial ability, strength, and toughness. Torino supporters later nicknamed him Trincea (English: "Trench") during his time at the club.

== Career statistics ==
Appearances and goals by club, season and competition
Club	Season	League			Coppa Italia		Europe		Other		Total	
Club	Season	Division	Apps	Goals	Apps	Goals	Apps	Goals	Apps	Goals	Apps	Goals
San Donà	1960–61	Serie D	2	0	—		—		—		2	0
San Donà	1961–62	Serie D	10	0	—		—		—		10	0
San Donà	San Donà total		12	0	—		—		—		12	0
Torino	1962–63	Serie A	0	0	0	0	—		0	0	0	0
Torino	1963–64	Serie A	0	0	0	0	—		—		0	0
Torino	1964–65	Serie A	0	0	0	0	0	0	—		0	0
Torino	1965–66	Serie A	16	0	1	0	0	0	—		17	0
Torino	1966–67	Serie A	25	0	3	0	—		5 (Note: Appearances in the Cup of the Alps)	0	33	0
Torino	1967–68	Serie A	17	0	8	0	—		2 (Note: Appearances in the 1968 Intertoto Cup)	0	27	0
Torino	1968–69	Serie A	24	1	10	0	4 (Note: Appearances in the UEFA Cup Winners' Cup)	0	—		38	1
Torino	1969–70	Serie A	26	0	8	0	—		—		34	0
Torino	1970–71	Serie A	27	4	12	0	—		2 (Note: Appearances in the Mitropa Cup)	0	41	4
Torino	1971–72	Serie A	29	0	0	0	6	0	2 (Note: Appearances in the Anglo-Italian League Cup)	0	37	0
Torino	1972–73	Serie A	14	0	0	0	0	0	4 (Note: Appearances in the Anglo-Italian Cup)	0	18	0
Torino	1973–74	Serie A	21	0	4	0	2 (Note: Appearances in the UEFA Cup)	0	—		27	0
Torino	1974–75	Serie A	27	0	10	0	2	0	—		39	0
Torino	Torino total		226	5	56	0	14	0	15	0	311	5
Bologna	1975–76	Serie A	25	0	3	0	—		—		28	0
Bologna	1976–77	Serie A	20	0	7	0	—		—		27	0
Bologna	1977–78	Serie A	5	0	4	0	—		—		9	0
Bologna	Bologna total		50	0	14	0	—		—		64	0
Career total			288	5	70	0	14	0	15	0	387	5

== Honours ==
Torino

- Coppa Italia: 1967–68, 1970–71

Individual

- Torino FC Hall of Fame: 2021
