= Aldo Agroppi =

Italian footballer (1944–2025)

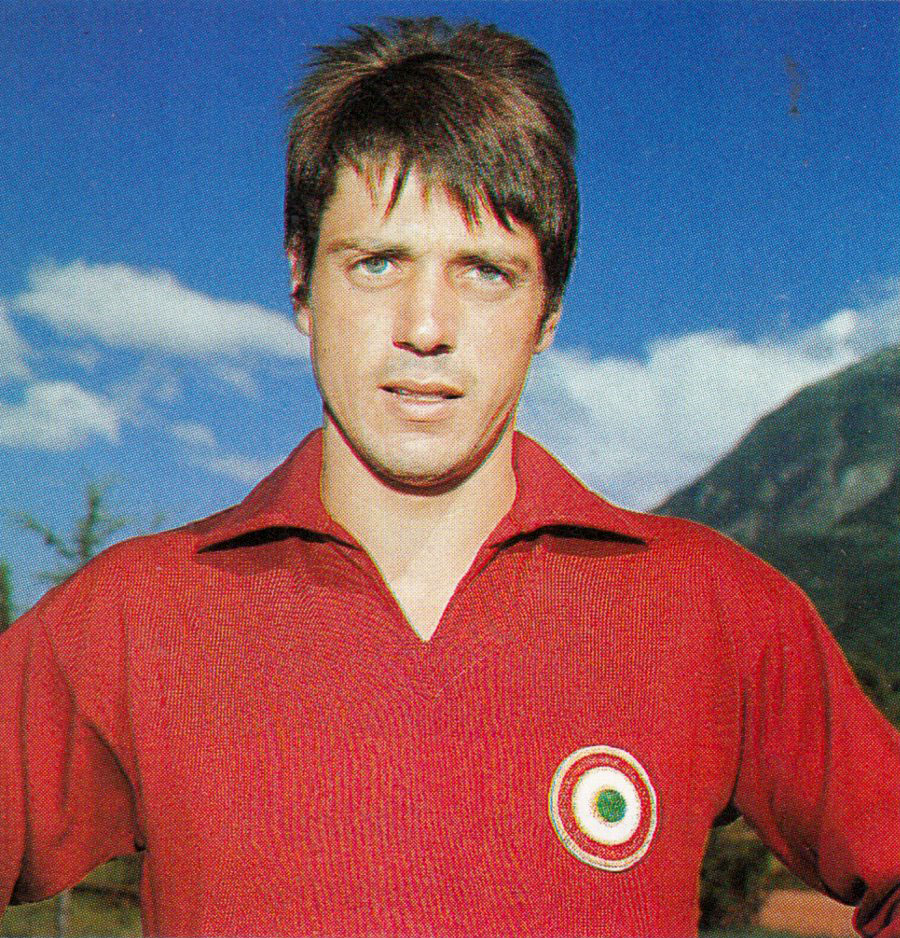
- Agroppi with Torino in the 1968–69 season

Personal information
- Date of birth: 14 April 1944
- Place of birth: Piombino, Italy
- Date of death: 2 January 2025 (aged 80)
- Place of death: Piombino, Italy
- Height: 1.80 m (5 ft 11 in)
- Position: Midfielder

Senior career*
Years	Team	Apps	(Gls)
1963–1975	Torino	212	(15)
1964–1965	→ Genoa (loan)	0	(0)
1965–1966	→ Ternana (loan)	26	(6)
1966–1967	→ Potenza (loan)	35	(3)
1975–1977	Perugia	37	(2)
Total		310	(26)

International career
1972–1973	Italy	5	(0)

Managerial career
- 1980–1981: Pescara
- 1981–1982: Pisa
- 1982–1983: Perugia
- 1983–1984: Padova
- 1984–1985: Perugia
- 1985–1986: Fiorentina
- 1987–1988: Como
- 1990: Ascoli
- 1993: Fiorentina
- * Club domestic league appearances and goals

Aldo Agroppi (Italian pronunciation: [ˈaldo aˈɡrɔppi]; 14 April 1944 – 2 January 2025) was an Italian professional coach and a footballer, who played as a midfielder.

== Club career ==
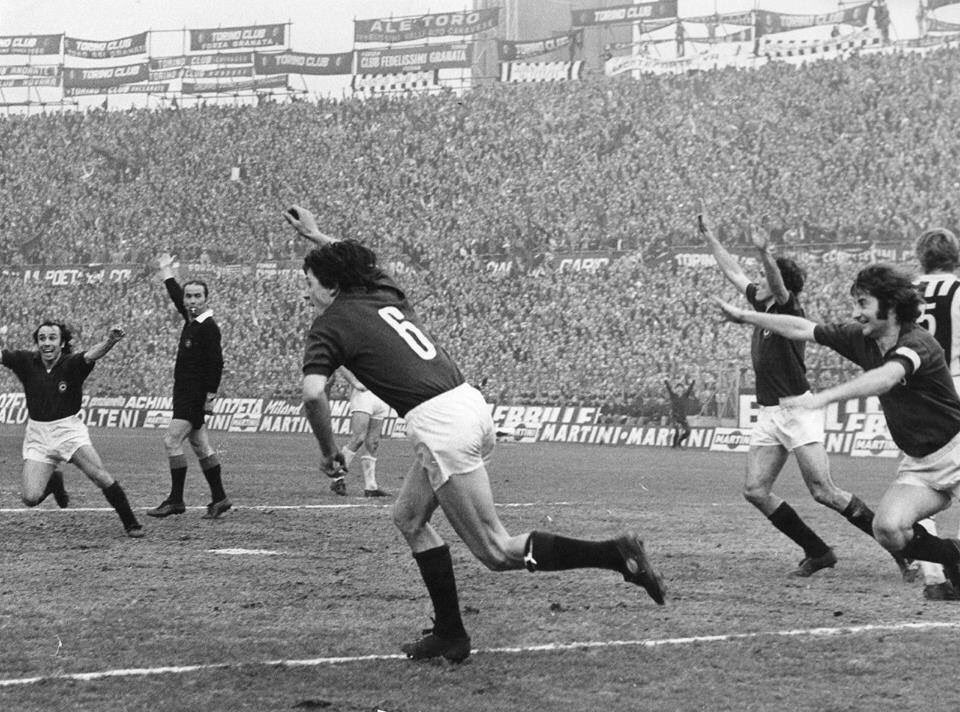
1971–72 Serie A - Torino v Juventus - Agroppi rejoices after his goal

Agroppi played for 12 seasons (249 games, 17 goals) in Serie A with clubs Torino Calcio and Perugia Calcio. An important player for Torino, he made over 200 appearances for the club, winning two Coppa Italia titles.

== International career ==
Agroppi made his international debut for the Italy national team on 17 June 1972 in a game against Romania.

== Managerial career ==
As a coach, Agroppi managed several Italian clubs throughout his career: Pescara, Pisa, Perugia, Padova, Fiorentina, Como, and Ascoli. He coached ACF Fiorentina on two occasions: he firstly coached the team during the 1985–86 season, leading the club to a fourth-place finish in Serie A, although he was subsequently banned from football for four months for his involvement in the Totonero 1986 match-fixing scandal during his spells with Perugia; he later returned to manage the team in the 1992–93 season, but with less success, as the club were relegated to Serie B at the end of the season.

== Death ==
Agroppi died from pneumonia in Piombino, on 2 January 2025, at the age of 80.

== Honours ==
Torino;

- Coppa Italia: 1967–68, 1970–71

Individual;

- Torino FC Hall of Fame: 2017
