= Lino Golin =

Italian footballer

Personal information
- Date of birth: 31 January 1945 (age 81)
- Place of birth: Soave, Italy
- Height: 1.77 m (5 ft 9 1/2 in)
- Position: Midfielder

Youth career
- Verona

Senior career*
Years	Team	Apps	(Gls)
1962–1963	Verona	7	(0)
1963–1964	Pistoiese	32	(7)
1964–1967	Verona	105	(12)
1967–1973	Milan	25	(3)
1968–1969	→ Varese (loan)	25	(4)
1970–1971	→ Monza (loan)	22	(1)
1973–1976	Foggia	33	(0)
- * Club domestic league appearances and goals

Lino Golin (born 31 January 1945 in Soave) is an Italian former footballer who played as a midfielder. He made nearly 250 appearances in the Italian professional leagues, and played for 6 seasons (65 games, 7 goals) in Serie A for Milan, Varese and Foggia.

== Honours ==
Milan

- Serie A champion: 1967–68.
- Coppa Italia winner: 1971–72, 1972–73.
- UEFA Cup Winners' Cup winner: 1972–73.
- Intercontinental Cup winner: 1969.
