= Pier Paolo Scarrone =

Italian footballer

Personal information
- Date of birth: 26 June 1951 (age 75)
- Place of birth: Alessandria, Italy
- Height: 1.71 m (5 ft 7 1/2 in)
- Position: Midfielder

Youth career
- Alessandria

Senior career*
Years	Team	Apps	(Gls)
1970–1972	Milan	3	(1)
1972–1973	Genoa	18	(1)
1973–1978	Bari	171	(33)
1978–1979	Parma	18	(3)
1979–1982	Reggina	90	(5)
1982–1985	Alessandria	83	(10)
1985–1987	Casale	58	(8)
1987–1988	Biellese	29	(3)
1988–1990	Novese	57	(?)
1990–1991	Pegliese	29	(2)
- * Club domestic league appearances and goals

Pier Paolo Scarrone (born 26 June 1951 in Alessandria) is an Italian former professional footballer who played as a midfielder.

He played 2 seasons (3 games, 1 goal which he scored on his professional debut for A.C. Milan against Cagliari in Serie A).

== Honours ==
- Coppa Italia winner: 1971/72.
