= Luigi Maldera =

Italian footballer and manager (1946–2021)

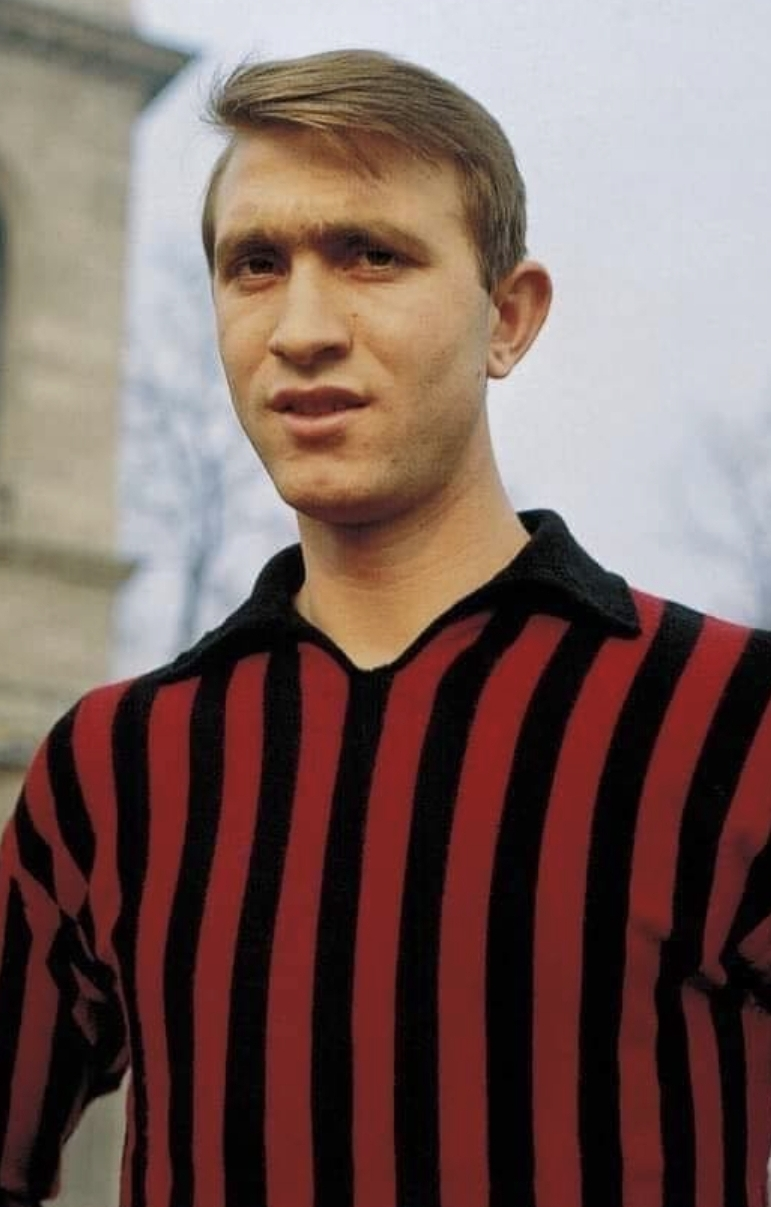

Personal information
- Date of birth: 19 January 1946
- Place of birth: Corato, Italy
- Date of death: 5 November 2021 (aged 75)
- Height: 1.86 m (6 ft 1 in)
- Position: Defender

Youth career
- Milan

Senior career*
Years	Team	Apps	(Gls)
1965–1966	Milan	0	(0)
1966–1967	Verona	17	(0)
1967–1968	Monza	38	(2)
1968–1969	Verona	12	(0)
1969–1971	Milan	35	(3)
1971–1978	Catanzaro	206	(5)
1978–1979	Piacenza	20	(1)
1979–1982	Seregno	77	(6)

Managerial career
- 1982–1997: Milan Youth Sector
- * Club domestic league appearances and goals

Luigi Maldera (19 January 1946 – 5 November 2021) was an Italian football coach and player who made more than 400 appearances in the Italian professional leagues playing as a defender. He played five seasons (92 games, 4 goals) in Serie A for Hellas Verona, A.C. Milan and Catanzaro.

== Personal life ==
His younger brothers Attilio Maldera and Aldo Maldera played football professionally. To distinguish them, Luigi was referred to as Maldera I, Attilio as Maldera II and Aldo as Maldera III. He was a father of football manager Andrea Maldera.

== Honours ==
Milan

- European Cup: 1968–69
- Intercontinental Cup: 1969
