= Giuseppe Tamborini =

Italian footballer and coach

Personal information
- Date of birth: 19 March 1943 (age 83)
- Place of birth: Lacchiarella, Italy
- Height: 1.72 m (5 ft 7 1/2 in)
- Position: Midfielder

Senior career*
Years	Team	Apps	(Gls)
1961–1962	Solbiatese	28	(2)
1962–1964	Sampdoria	62	(5)
1964–1967	Roma	91	(6)
1967–1972	Varese	117	(10)
1972–1974	Reggina	65	(6)
1974–1975	Belluno	29	(0)
1975–1976	Cremonese	31	(0)
1976–1977	Pordenone	28	(2)
1978–1979	Brindisi	24	(0)

Managerial career
- Nissa
- 2006: Boca San Lazzaro
- 2006–2007: Viterbese
- * Club domestic league appearances and goals

Giuseppe Tamborini (born 19 March 1943 in Lacchiarella) is an Italian former football coach and professional player who played as a midfielder. He played for 9 seasons (257 games, 19 goals) in Serie A for Sampdoria, Roma and Varese.
