= Angelo Paina =

Italian footballer (1949–2024)

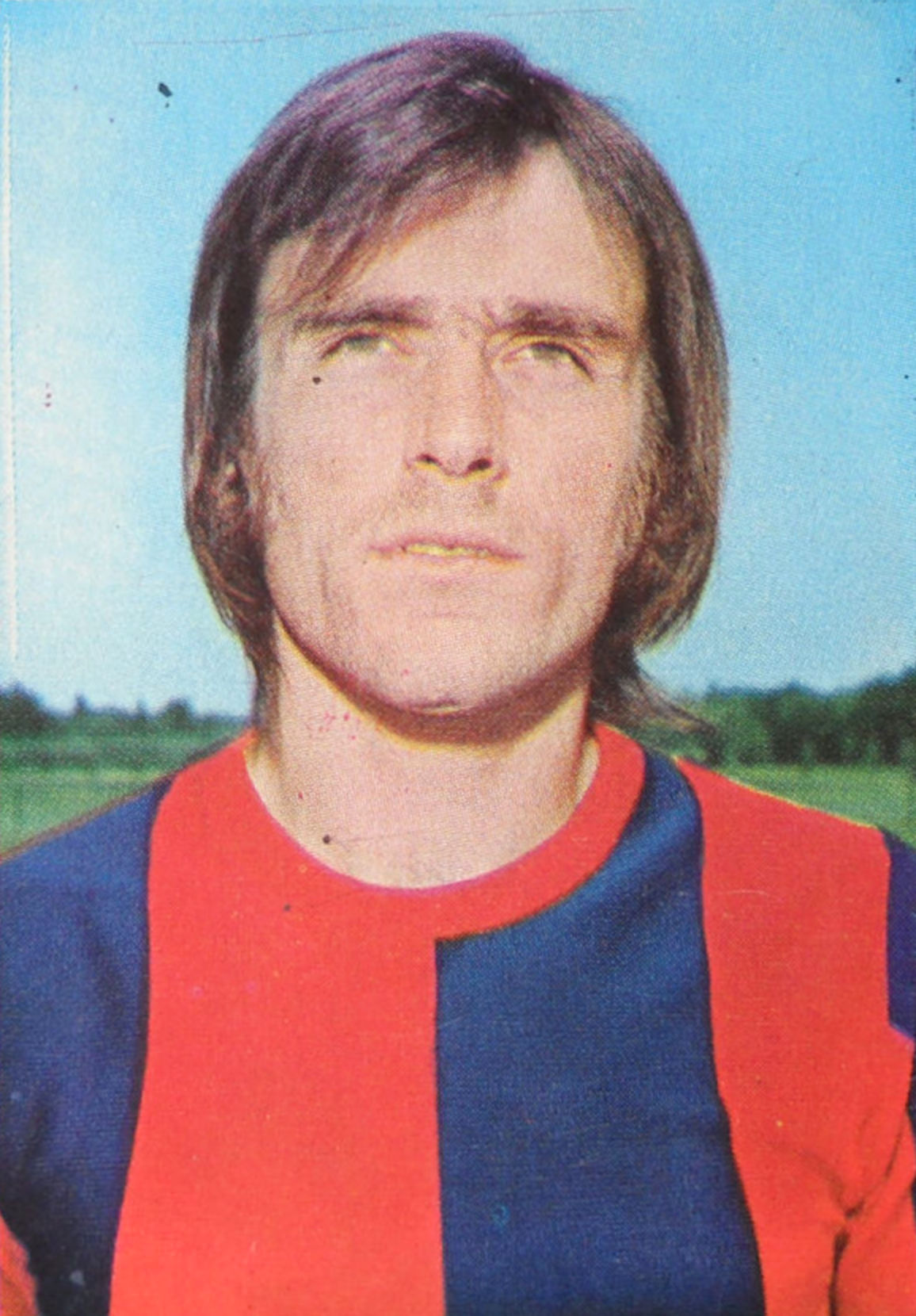
- Paina with Taranto in 1973

Personal information
- Date of birth: 19 April 1949
- Place of birth: Senna Lodigiana, Italy
- Date of death: 23 June 2024 (aged 75)
- Place of death: Piazza Brembana, Italy
- Height: 1.82 m (6 ft 0 in)
- Position: Striker

Youth career
- A.C. Milan

Senior career*
Years	Team	Apps	(Gls)
1966–1967	A.C. Milan	0	(0)
1967–1968	Padova	9	(1)
1968–1970	Triestina	69	(22)
1970–1971	A.C. Milan	4	(0)
1971–1974	Taranto	88	(16)
1974–1977	SPAL	85	(26)
1977–1979	Atalanta	34	(3)
1979–1980	Triestina	11	(0)
- * Club domestic league appearances and goals

Angelo Paina (19 April 1949 – 23 June 2024) was an Italian footballer who played as a striker. He made 300 appearances in the Italian professional leagues. Paina played three seasons (38 games, 3 goals) in Serie A for A.C. Milan and Atalanta.

Paina died from complications of Alzheimer's disease in Piazza Brembana, on 23 June 2024, at the age of 75.
