= Giorgio Puia =

Italian footballer and manager

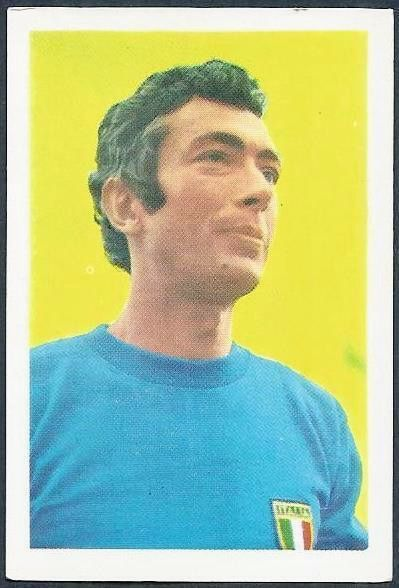
- Puia in 1970

Personal information
- Date of birth: 8 March 1938 (age 88)
- Place of birth: Gorizia, Italy
- Position: Defender

Youth career
- 195?–1958: Pro Gorizia

Senior career*
Years	Team	Apps	(Gls)
1958–1960	Triestina	32	(7)
1960–1963	L.R. Vicenza	81	(19)
1963–1972	Torino	250	(10)
Total		363	(36)

International career
1962–1970	Italy	7	(0)

Managerial career
- 1974–1975: Ivrea
- 1976–1977: Biellese
- 1983–1984: Latina
Medal record
Representing Italy
Men's Football
FIFA World Cup
Runner-up	1970 Mexico
- * Club domestic league appearances and goals

Giorgio Puia (Italian pronunciation: [ˈdʒordʒo ˈpuːja]; 8 March 1938) is an Italian football manager and former player who played as a defender.

== Club career ==
During his club career, Puia played for A.S. Pro Gorizia, U.S. Triestina Calcio, Vicenza and Torino.

== International career ==
Puia earned 7 caps for the Italy national football team between 1962 and 1970, and was included in the Italian squad for the 1970 FIFA World Cup, although his only World Cup appearances came in the 1970 qualifying tournament; Italy reached the final of the competition, only to lose out to Brazil 4–1. He made his international debut on 11 November 1962 against Austria, whilst his final appearance came on 10 May 1970 against Portugal.

== Honours ==
=== Club ===
Torino

- Coppa Italia (2): 1967–68, 1970–71
