= Vincenzo Zazzaro =

Italian footballer (1951–2019)

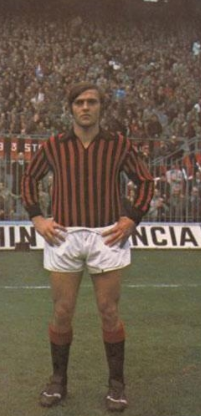

Personal information
- Date of birth: 2 January 1951
- Place of birth: Quarto, Italy
- Date of death: 12 November 2019 (aged 68)
- Height: 1.72 m (5 ft 7 1/2 in)
- Position: Midfielder

Senior career*
Years	Team	Apps	(Gls)
1968–1969	Puteolana	9	
1970–1976	Milan	11	(0)
1972–1973	→ Lecco (loan)	35	(0)
1973–1974	→ Reggina (loan)	32	(1)
1974–1976	→ Arezzo (loan)	52	(1)
1976–1980	Salernitana	99	(2)
1980–1981	Turris	19	(0)

International career
1971	Italy U21	2	(0)
- * Club domestic league appearances and goals

Vincenzo Zazzaro (2 January 1951 – 12 November 2019) was an Italian former professional footballer who played as a midfielder. He was born in Quarto. He played 11 games in Serie A and 5 in the UEFA Cup for A.C. Milan in the 1971–72 season. He represented Italy at under-21 level.
