= 1970–71 Coppa Italia =

Tournament details
- Country: Italy
- Dates: 30 Aug 1970 – 27 June 1971
- Teams: 36

Final positions
- Champions: Torino (4th title)
- Runners-up: Milan

Tournament statistics
- Matches played: 77
- Goals scored: 176 (2.29 per match)
- Top goal scorer: Gianni Rivera (7 goals)

The 1970–71 Coppa Italia, the 24th Coppa Italia was an Italian Football Federation domestic cup competition won by Torino.

== Group stage ==
=== Group 1 ===
Pos	Team	Pld	W	D	L	GF	GA	GD	Pts
1	Livorno	3	2	1	0	3	0	+3	5
2	Cagliari	3	2	0	1	8	5	+3	4
3	Massese	3	1	1	1	2	4	−2	3
4	Pisa	3	0	0	3	2	6	−4	0

=== Group 2 ===
Pos	Team	Pld	W	D	L	GF	GA	GD	Pts
1	Cesena	3	2	1	0	3	1	+2	5
2	Bologna	3	1	1	1	3	2	+1	3
3	Modena	3	1	0	2	2	3	−1	2
4	Vicenza	3	1	0	2	2	4	−2	2

=== Group 3 ===
Pos	Team	Pld	W	D	L	GF	GA	GD	Pts
1	Monza	3	1	2	0	4	3	+1	4
2	Atalanta	3	1	2	0	3	2	+1	4
3	Internazionale	3	1	1	1	6	3	+3	3
4	Como	3	0	1	2	1	6	−5	1

Play-off match

Home team	Score	Away team
Monza	1–1 (p: 5–4)	Atalanta

p=after penalty shoot-out

=== Group 4 ===
Pos	Team	Pld	W	D	L	GF	GA	GD	Pts
1	Milan	3	3	0	0	7	1	+6	6
2	Mantova	3	2	0	1	3	2	+1	4
3	Brescia	3	1	0	2	2	3	−1	2
4	Varese	3	0	0	3	1	7	−6	0

=== Group 5 ===
Pos	Team	Pld	W	D	L	GF	GA	GD	Pts
1	Novara	3	2	1	0	4	2	+2	5
2	Juventus	3	1	2	0	6	4	+2	4
3	Arezzo	3	1	0	2	2	4	−2	2
4	Hellas Verona	3	0	1	2	1	3	−2	1

=== Group 6 ===
Pos	Team	Pld	W	D	L	GF	GA	GD	Pts
1	Torino	3	2	1	0	8	4	+4	5
2	Sampdoria	3	1	2	0	5	4	+1	4
3	Ternana	3	1	1	1	3	2	+1	3
4	Perugia	3	0	0	3	1	7	−6	0

=== Group 7 ===
Pos	Team	Pld	W	D	L	GF	GA	GD	Pts
1	Fiorentina	3	3	0	0	6	0	+6	6
2	Bari	3	2	0	1	3	3	0	4
3	Taranto	3	1	0	2	2	3	−1	2
4	Foggia	3	0	0	3	0	5	−5	0

=== Group 8 ===
Pos	Team	Pld	W	D	L	GF	GA	GD	Pts
1	Roma	3	3	0	0	5	1	+4	6
2	Lazio	3	2	0	1	5	3	+2	4
3	Catanzaro	3	1	0	2	3	5	−2	2
4	Palermo	3	0	0	3	1	5	−4	0

=== Group 9 ===
Pos	Team	Pld	W	D	L	GF	GA	GD	Pts
1	Napoli	3	3	0	0	10	1	+9	6
2	Catania	3	0	2	1	3	5	−2	2
3	Casertana	3	0	2	1	0	2	−2	2
4	Reggina	3	0	2	1	4	9	−5	2

== Qualifying play-off ==
Of the nine groupwinners, the first seven randomly drawn qualified directly for the quarter-finals. The remaining two teams were forced to play in a qualifying playoff. Results from the group stage were not used to rank the first-placed teams.

Home team	Score	Away team
Monza	0–0 (p: 5–4)	Novara

p=after penalty shoot-out

== Quarter-finals ==
Team 1	Agg.	Team 2	1st leg	2nd leg
Milan	6–0	Livorno	2–0	4–0
Torino	2–0	Roma	1–0	1–0
Fiorentina	4–1	Monza	2–1	2–0
Napoli	3–0	Cesena	1–0	2–0

== Final group ==
Pos	Team	Pld	W	D	L	GF	GA	GD	Pts	ACM	TOR	FIO	NAP
1	Milan	6	3	1	2	10	9	+1	7	—	3–2	1–0	2–2
1	Torino	6	3	1	2	9	9	0	7	1–0	—	1–1	2–0
3	Fiorentina	6	2	2	2	9	5	+4	6	1–2	4–0	—	2–0
4	Napoli	6	1	2	3	7	12	−5	4	3–2	1–3	1–1	—

Source: historical-lineups.com

== Final play-off ==
Pos	Team	Pld	W	D	L	GF	GA	GD	Pts	ACM	TOR	FIO	NAP
1	Milan	6	3	1	2	10	9	+1	7	—	3–2	1–0	2–2
1	Torino	6	3	1	2	9	9	0	7	1–0	—	1–1	2–0
3	Fiorentina	6	2	2	2	9	5	+4	6	1–2	4–0	—	2–0
4	Napoli	6	1	2	3	7	12	−5	4	3–2	1–3	1–1	—

Source: historical-lineups.com
27 June 1971
18:00

Torino	0–0 (a.e.t.)	Milan
Penalties
Cereser (penalty missed); Maddé (penalty scored); Maddé (penalty scored); Maddé (penalty scored); Maddé (penalty scored); Maddé (penalty scored)	5–3	(penalty scored) Rivera; (penalty scored) Rivera; (penalty scored) Rivera; (penalty missed) Rivera; (penalty missed) Rivera; Rivera resigned from the last shot

Stadio Luigi Ferraris, Genoa
Referee: Francesco Francescon

== Top goalscorers ==
Rank	Player	Club	Goals
1	(Italy) Gianni Rivera	Milan	7
2	(Italy) Luciano Chiarugi	Fiorentina	6
3	(Italy) Luigi Riva	Cagliari	5
3	(Italy) Carlo Petrini	Torino	5
3	(Italy) Paolo Pulici	Torino	5
6	(Brazil) (Italy) José Altafini	Napoli	4
6	(Italy) Angelo Sormani	Napoli	4
6	(Italy) Pierluigi Gabetto	Novara	4
6	(France) Néstor Combin	Milan	4
