= 1972–73 AC Milan season =

Milan Associazione Calcio
1972–73 season
- President: Albino Buticchi
- Manager: Cesare Maldini (with Nereo Rocco as technical director)
- Stadium: San Siro
- Serie A: 2nd
- Coppa Italia: Winners
- Cup Winners' Cup: Winners
- Top goalscorer: League: Gianni Rivera (17); All: Luciano Chiarugi (22)
- Average home league attendance: 53,977
Home colours	Away colours

During the 1972–1973 season Milan Associazione Calcio competed in Serie A, Coppa Italia and Cup Winners' Cup.

== Summary ==
In July 1972, Albino Buticchi became the new Milan president, while Nereo Rocco assumed the role of technical director, with Cesare Maldini as coach. The new signings during the summer transfer market were Luciano Chiarugi, Dario Dolci and Maurizio Turone. In autumn 1972, after five years and 183 games with the Rossoneri, goalkeeper Fabio Cudicini, already out for some kidney problems, ended his career, and was replaced by Villiam Vecchi.

In the league, Milan suffered only tw defeats in the first half of the season, and concluded in first position, with 22 points, as many as those scored by Juventus, also thanks to the contribution of a prolific attacking play. In the end 65 were the goals scored, with an average of more than two per game. Memorable was the 9–3 inflicted to Atalanta on 15 October 1972. The match against Atalanta still holds the record for most goals scored in a Serie A game. Rossoneri and Bianconeri continued side by side at the top of the standings until the 20th round, when Juventus lost the derby with Torino while Milan beat Lanerossi Vicenza, thus gaining 2 points over the Bianconeri. In March, Milan even had a three-point lead over their competitors, then reduced to one due to the defeat on 22 April at the Stadio Olimpico against Lazio, with a goal disallowed to Chiarugi by referee Concetto Lo Bello and the subsequent sending-off of Rocco for protesting. On the eve of the last matchday Milan lead the standings with 44 points ahead of Juventus and Lazio, paired at 43 points. Milan, who had played the Cup Winners' Cup final a few days earlier, had to face Verona away, who beat the Rossoneri 5–3. Lazio lost in the final in Naples and Juventus was drawing against Roma, but a few minutes to the end Antonello Cuccureddu scored the winning goal that gave the Bianconeri the scudetto. Milan thus closed the championship in second place, and this episode was nicknamed the Fatal Verona. Milan captain Gianni Rivera was the top scorer of the competition, with 17 goals, tied with Paolo Pulici and Giuseppe Savoldi.

In the Cup Winners' Cup, Milan qualified to the final after eliminating Red Boys Differdange from Luxembourg in the round of 32 (4–1 victory in the first leg in Differdange and 3–0 in the second leg in Milan), in the round of 16 knocking out the Poles of Legia Warsaw (1–1 in Warsaw and 2–1 victory after extra time at San Siro), in the quarter-finals the Soviets from Spartak Moscow (1–0 victory in Sochi and 1–1 draw in Milan) and in the semi-final the Czechoslovak side Sparta Prague (two 1–0 victories). In the final in Thessaloniki on 16 May 1973, Milan faced the English side of Leeds United and won the match thanks to a free-kick scored at the third minute by Chiarugi, who became the top scorer of the tournament with 7 goals. It was the second Cup Winners' Cup won by the Rossoneri.

The season ended with the Coppa Italia, where Milan, as holder of the trophy, started directly from the second round. They ended group B, which also includes Atalanta, Cagliari and Napoli, in first place with 10 points from five wins and one defeat, and qualified for the final on 1 July 1973 at the Olimpico of Rome against Juventus. About a month after the Fatal Verona, Milan took revenge by beating Juventus at the penalty shoot-outs, thus winning their third national cup. The match ended 1–1 after extra time (in the first half, Romeo Benetti responded to Juventus' goal by Roberto Bettega from a penalty kick). At the penalty shoot-outs, Schnellinger, again Benetti, Chiarugi, Biasiolo and Magherini scored, while the Bianconeri missed three out of five shots, setting the score at 5–2 for Milan.

== Squad ==
Note: Flags indicate national team as defined under FIFA eligibility rules; some limited exceptions apply. Players may hold more than one non-FIFA nationality.

Pos.	Nation	Player
GK	ITA	Pierangelo Belli
GK	ITA	Fabio Cudicini
GK	ITA	Villiam Vecchi
GK	ITA	Renato Marson
DF	ITA	Angelo Anquilletti
DF	ITA	Giulio Zignoli
DF	ITA	Dario Dolci
DF	ITA	Roberto Rosato
DF	ITA	Maurizio Turone
DF	ITA	Giuseppe Sabadini
DF	GER	Karl-Heinz Schnellinger (vice-captain)
MF	ITA	Roberto Casone

Pos.	Nation	Player
MF	ITA	Romeo Benetti
MF	ITA	Giorgio Biasiolo
MF	ITA	Guido Magherini
MF	ITA	Gianni Rivera (Captain)
MF	ITA	Riccardo Sogliano
FW	ITA	Luciano Chiarugi
FW	ITA	Lino Golin
FW	ITA	Alberto Bigon
FW	ITA	Pierino Prati
FW	ITA	Silvano Villa
FW	ITA	Carlo Tresoldi
FW	ITA	Graziano Gori

== Transfers ==
In
Pos.	Name	from	Type
DF	Dario Dolci	Varese	
DF	Maurizio Turone	Genoa	
MF	Roberto Casone	Sampdoria	loan end
FW	Luciano Chiarugi	Fiorentina	

Out
Pos.	Name	To	Type
DF	Aldo Maldera	Bologna	loan
DF	Luciano Monticolo	Catanzaro	
MF	Pier Paolo Scarrone	Genoa	
MF	Vincenzo Zazzaro	Lecco	loan
FW	Silvano Villa	Sampdoria	loan
GK	Fabio Cudicini	–	career end

== Competitions ==
=== Serie A ===
==== League table ====
Pos	Team	Pld	W	D	L	GF	GA	GD	Pts	Qualification or relegation
1	Juventus (C)	30	18	9	3	45	22	+23	45	Qualification to European Cup
2	Milan	30	18	8	4	65	33	+32	44	Qualification to Cup Winners' Cup
3	Lazio	30	16	11	3	33	16	+17	43	Qualification to UEFA Cup
4	Fiorentina	30	16	5	9	39	26	+13	37	Qualification to UEFA Cup
5	Internazionale	30	15	7	8	32	23	+9	37	Qualification to UEFA Cup

Source: Panini
(C) Champions

==== Matches ====
24 September 1972 1	Milan	4–0	Palermo	Milan
	Rivera 19' (pen.), 31'; Chiarugi 44'; Prati 85'	Report		Stadium: Stadio San Siro; Attendance: 47,682; Referee: Barbaresco

1 October 1972 2	Ternana	0–0	Milan	Terni
		Report		Stadium: Stadio Libero Liberati; Attendance: 30,949; Referee: Monti

15 October 1972 3	Milan	9–3	Atalanta	Milan
	Prati 16', 55', 90'; Bigon 30', 64'; Rivera 35', 52'; Benetti 40'; Chiarugi 50'	Report	33' Divina; 54' Ghio; 88' Carelli	Stadium: Stadio San Siro; Attendance: 47,316; Referee: Giunti

29 October 1972 4	Juventus	2–2	Milan	Turin
	Salvadore 70'; Causio 75'	Report	32' Bigon; 76' Rivera	Stadium: Stadio Comunale; Attendance: 65,818; Referee: Pieroni

5 November 1972 5	Milan	2–0	Lanerossi Vicenza	Milan
	Biasiolo 28'; Rivera 87' (pen.)	Report		Stadium: Stadio San Siro; Attendance: 39,327; Referee: Trinchieri

12 November 1972 6	Fiorentina	3–1	Milan	Florence
	Longoni 20'; Clerici 39'; Caso 49'	Report	4' Prati	Stadium: Stadio Comunale; Attendance: 43,412; Referee: Lo Bello

19 November 1972 7	Milan	3–2	Inter Milan	Milan
	Prati 23'; Rosato 31'; Benetti 52'	Report	74' Oriali; 77' Boninsegna	Stadium: Stadio San Siro; Attendance: 80,028; Referee: Angonese

26 November 1972 8	Roma	0–0	Milan	Rome
		Report		Stadium: Stadio Olimpico; Attendance: 63,342; Referee: Toselli

3 December 1972 9	Milan	3–1	Sampdoria	Milan
	Benetti 30'; Chiarugi 40'; Sogliano 69'	Report	23' Salvi	Stadium: Stadio San Siro; Attendance: 30,675; Referee: Trono

10 December 1972 10	Cagliari	0–1	Milan	Cagliari
		Report	57' Bigon	Stadium: Stadio Sant'Elia; Attendance: 33,073; Referee: Pieroni

17 December 1973 11	Milan	3–1	Lazio	Milan
	Chiarugi 45'; Bigon 48'; Benetti 72'	Report	9' (o.g.) Rosato	Stadium: Stadio San Siro; Attendance: 28,373; Referee: Lo Bello

24 December 1972 12	Napoli	0–0	Milan	Naples
		Report		Stadium: Stadio San Paolo; Attendance: 55,024; Referee: Lo Bello

30 December 1972 13	Milan	1–0	Torino	Milan
	Rivera 87'	Report		Stadium: Stadio San Siro; Attendance: 37,988; Referee: Francescon

7 January 1973 14	Bologna	3–2	Milan	Bologna
	Ghetti 4'; Savoldi 27' (pen.); Novellini 42'	Report	60' (pen.) Rivera; 87' Chiarugi	Stadium: Stadio Comunale; Attendance: 41,893; Referee: Serafino

21 January 1973 15	Milan	2–1	Hellas Verona	Milan
	Chiarugi 15', 53'	Report	90' (pen.) Mascetti	Stadium: Stadio San Siro; Attendance: 34,270; Referee: Ciacci

28 January 1973 16	Palermo	0–1	Milan	Palermo
		Report	80' (pen.) Rivera	Stadium: Stadio La Favorita; Attendance: 17,066; Referee: Menegali

4 February 1973 17	Milan	3–1	Ternana	Milan
	Benatti 11' (o.g.); Rivera 16'; Chiarugi 66'	Report	90' (pen.) Cardillo	Stadium: Stadio San Siro; Attendance: 45,899; Referee: Trinchieri

11 February 1973 18	Atalanta	1–1	Milan	Bergamo
	Pellizzaro 43' (pen.)	Report	35' Chiarugi	Stadium: Stadio Comunale; Attendance: 31,575; Referee: Barbaresco

18 February 1973 19	Milan	2–2	Juventus	Milan
	Rivera 44' (pen.); Biasiolo 85'	Report	12' Bettega; 50' Marchetti	Stadium: Stadio San Siro; Attendance: 80,500; Referee: Pieroni

4 March 1973 20	Lanerossi Vicenza	0–3	Milan	Vicenza
		Report	29' Rivera; 43' Chiarugi; 70' Biasiolo	Stadium: Stadio Romeo Menti; Attendance: 29,269; Referee: Monti

11 March 1973 21	Milan	2–0	Fiorentina	Milan
	Benetti 72', 85'	Report		Stadium: Stadio San Siro; Attendance: 64,777; Referee: Francescon

18 March 1973 22	Inter Milan	0–2	Milan	Milan
		Report	39' Sabadini; 90' Benetti	Stadium: Stadio San Siro; Attendance: 80,637; Referee: Lattanzi

25 March 1973 23	Milan	3–1	Roma	Milan
	Bigon 35'; Rivera 52', 85' (pen.)	Report	83' Morini	Stadium: Stadio San Siro; Attendance: 55,838; Referee: Barbaresco

8 April 1973 24	Sampdoria	1–4	Milan	Genoa
	Salvi 21'	Report	6' Rivera; 26', 68' Bigon; 48' Biasiolo	Stadium: Stadio Luigi Ferraris; Attendance: 36,943; Referee: Gonella

15 April 1973 25	Milan	1–1	Cagliari	Milan
	Rivera 81' (pen.)	Report	50' Brugnera	Stadium: Stadio San Siro; Attendance: 57,923; Referee: Francescon

21 April 1973 26	Lazio	2–1	Milan	Rome
	Schnellinger 5' (o.g.); Chinaglia 35'	Report	56' Rivera	Stadium: Stadio Olimpico; Attendance: 70,403; Referee: Lo Bello

29 April 1973 27	Milan	1–0	Napoli	Milan
	Chiarugi 90'	Report		Stadium: Stadio San Siro; Attendance: 55,927; Referee: Monti

6 May 1973 28	Torino	2–2	Milan	Turin
	Pulici 21' (pen.); Bui 24'	Report	49' Chiarugi; 81' Sabadini	Stadium: Stadio Comunale; Attendance: 58,032; Referee: Angonese

13 May 1973 29	Milan	3–1	Bologna	Milan
	Sogliano 12'; Sabadini 56'; Bigon 69'	Report	86' (o.g.) Zignoli	Stadium: Stadio San Siro; Attendance: 81,280; Referee: Barbaresco

20 May 1973 30	Hellas Verona	5–3	Milan	Verona
	Sirena 17'; Sabadini 25' (o.g.); Luppi 29', 70'; Turone 72' (o.g.)	Report	32' Rosato; 81' Sabadini; 90' Bigon	Stadium: Stadio Marcantonio Bentegodi; Attendance: 40,049; Referee: Monti

=== Coppa Italia ===
==== Second round – Group B ====
26 May 1973 1	Atalanta	0–2	Milan	Bergamo
			1' Chiarugi; 15' Bigon	Stadium: Stadio Comunale; Attendance: 9,969; Referee: Panzino

3 June 1973 2	Milan	0–1	Cagliari	Milan
			65' Riva	Stadium: Stadio San Siro; Attendance: 18,939; Referee: Angonese

17 June 1973 3	Napoli	0–2	Milan	Naples
			8', 81' Chiarugi	Stadium: Stadio San Paolo; Attendance: 37,500; Referee: Gialluisi

20 June 1973 4	Milan	1–0	Atalanta	Milan
	Pirola 34' (o.g.)			Stadium: Stadio San Siro; Attendance: 9,845; Referee: Mascali

24 June 1973 5	Cagliari	0–1	Milan	Cagliari
			71' Rivera	Stadium: Stadio Sant'Elia; Attendance: 5,000; Referee: Lattanzi

27 June 1973 6	Milan	2–0	Napoli	Milan
	Rivera 18', 33' (pen.)			Stadium: Stadio San Siro; Attendance: 7,000; Referee: Trinchieri

==== Final ====
1 July 1973	Milan	1–1 (a.e.t.) (5–2 p)	Juventus	Rome
	Benetti 40' (pen.)		15' Bettega	Stadium: Stadio Olimpico; Attendance: 49,663; Referee: Angonese
	Penalties
	Schnellinger (penalty scored); Benetti (penalty scored); Chiarugi (penalty scored); Biasiolo (penalty scored); Magherini (penalty scored)		(penalty scored) Causio; (penalty missed) Anastasi; (penalty missed) Bettega; (penalty missed) Spinosi; (penalty scored) Cuccureddu

=== Cup Winners' Cup ===
==== Round of 32 ====
6 September 1972 1	Red Boys Differdange	1–4	Milan	Differdange
	Klein 90'		4', 17' Prati; 19' Golin; 83' Chiarugi	Stadium: Stade du Thillenberg; Attendance: 8,200; Referee: Wurtz

27 September 1972 2	Milan	3–0	Red Boys Differdange	Milan
	Chiarugi 4', 66'; Benetti 33'			Stadium: Stadio San Siro; Attendance: 15,000; Referee: Casha

==== Round of 16 ====
25 October 1972 1	Legia Warsaw	1–1	Milan	Warsaw
	Deyna 79'		75' Golin	Stadium: Polish Army Stadium; Attendance: 52,500; Referee: Michas

8 November 1972 2	Milan	2–1 (a.e.t.)	Legia Warsaw	Milan
	Zignoli 10'; Chiarugi 118'		44' Pieszko	Stadium: Stadio San Siro; Attendance: 8,770; Referee: Tschenscher

==== Quarterfinals ====
7 March 1973 1	Spartak Moscow	0–1	Milan	Sochi
			62' Benetti	Stadium: Sochi Central Stadium; Attendance: 12,000; Referee: Taylor

21 March 1973 2	Milan	1–1	Spartak Moscow	Milan
	Bigon 2'		7' Piskarëv	Stadium: Stadio San Siro; Attendance: 25,829; Referee: Gugulović

==== Semifinals ====
11 April 1973 1	Milan	1–0	Sparta Prague	Milan
	Chiarugi 68'			Stadium: Stadio San Siro; Attendance: 35,433; Referee: Paterson

25 April 1973 2	Sparta Prague	0–1	Milan	Prague
			73' Chiarugi	Stadium: Stadion Letná; Attendance: 40,000; Referee: Sánchez

==== Final ====
16 May 1973	Leeds United	0–1	Milan	Thessaloniki
			Chiarugi 3'	Stadium: Kaftanzoglio Stadium; Attendance: 40,154; Referee: Michas

== Statistics ==
=== Squad statistics ===
Competition	Points	Home						Away						Total						GD
Competition	Points	G	W	D	L	Gs	Ga	G	W	D	L	Gs	Ga	G	W	D	L	Gs	Ga	GD
1972-73 Serie A	44	15	13	2	0	42	14	15	5	6	4	26	19	30	18	8	4	65	33	+32
1972-73 Coppa Italia	–	3	2	0	1	3	1	3	3	0	0	5	0	7	5	1	1	9	2	+7
1972–73 Cup Winners' Cup	–	4	3	1	0	7	2	4	3	1	0	7	2	9	7	2	0	15	4	+11
Total	–	22	18	3	1	52	17	22	11	7	4	35	21	46	30	11	5	89	39	+50

=== Players statistics ===
No.	Pos	Nat	Player	Total		Serie A		Coppa Italia		Cup Winners' Cup	
No.	Pos	Nat	Player	Apps	Goals	Apps	Goals	Apps	Goals	Apps	Goals
	DF	(Italy) ITA	Angelo Anquilletti	41	0	28	0	5	0	8	0
	DF	(Italy) ITA	Dario Dolci	22	0	11	0	4	0	7	0
	GK	(Italy) ITA	Pierangelo Belli	18	-19	13	-16	0	-0	5	-3
	MF	(Italy) ITA	Giuseppe Sabadini	34	4	23	4	5	0	6	0
	GK	(Italy) ITA	Fabio Cudicini	0	0	0	-0	0	-0	0	-0
	MF	(Italy) ITA	Giorgio Biasiolo	34	4	22	4	5	0	7	0
	MF	(Italy) ITA	Guido Magherini	10	0	2	0	5	0	3	0
	FW	(Italy) ITA	Lino Golin	14	2	5	0	3	0	6	2
	GK	(Italy) ITA	Renato Marson	0	0	0	0	0	0	0	0
	FW	(Italy) ITA	Alberto Bigon	43	12	28	10	7	1	8	1
	FW	(Italy) ITA	Graziano Gori	1	0	0	0	1	0	0	0
	DF	(Italy) ITA	Romeo Benetti	43	10	29	7	7	1	7	2
	MF	(Italy) ITA	Roberto Rosato	38	2	25	2	7	0	6	0
	DF	(Italy) ITA	Giulio Zignoli	29	1	15	0	7	0	7	1
	FW	(Italy) ITA	Pierino Prati	21	8	17	6	0	0	4	2
	MF	(Italy) ITA	Gianni Rivera	43	20	28	17	6	3	9	0
	DF	(Italy) ITA	Maurizio Turone	24	0	15	0	4	0	5	0
	FW	(Italy) ITA	Luciano Chiarugi	40	22	27	12	5	3	8	7
	DF	(Germany) GER	Karl-Heinz Schnellinger	41	0	28	0	6	0	7	0
	MF	(Italy) ITA	Riccardo Sogliano	22	2	17	2	1	0	4	0
	MF	(Italy) ITA	Roberto Casone	6	0	1	0	4	0	1	0
	FW	(Italy) ITA	Carlo Tresoldi	2	0	1	0	0	0	1	0
	GK	(Italy) ITA	Villiam Vecchi	30	-20	19	-17	7	-2	4	-1

== See also ==
- A.C. Milan

== Bibliography ==
- Almanacco illustrato del Milan, ed: 2, March 2005. Panini.
- Enrico Tosi. La storia del Milan, May 2005. Italia/Italy cid Tosi.
- Milan. Sempre con te, December 2009. Mondadori. 2009. ISBN 978-88-04-59118-4.
