= 1973 Coppa Italia final =

25th Coppa Italia final
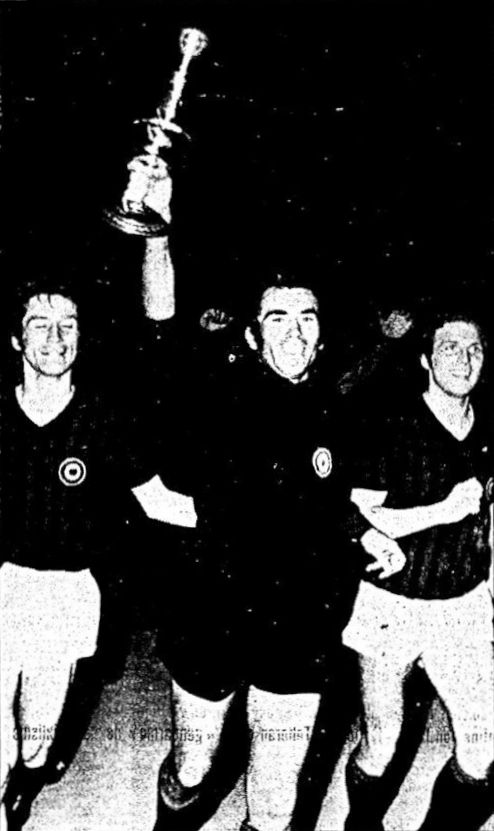
- Milan's goalkeeper Villiam Vecchi, key player on penalties epilogue, raises the trophy.
- Event: 1972–73 Coppa Italia
Milan	Juventus
1	1
- After extra time Milan won 5–2 on penalties
- Date: 1 July 1973
- Venue: Stadio Olimpico, Rome
- Referee: Alberto Michelotti

The 1973 Coppa Italia final was the final of the 1972–73 Coppa Italia. The match was played on 1 July 1973 between Milan and Juventus. Milan won 5–2 on penalties after the match ended 1–1 after extra time.

== Match ==
1 July 1973
21:00

Milan	1–1 (a.e.t.)	Juventus
Benetti 50' (pen.)		R. Bettega 15'
Penalties
Schnellinger (penalty scored); Benetti (penalty scored); Chiarugi (penalty scored); Biasiolo (penalty scored); Magherini (penalty scored)	5–2	(penalty scored) Causio; (penalty missed) Anastasi; (penalty missed) R. Bettega; (penalty missed) Spinosi; (penalty scored) Cuccureddu

Stadio Olimpico, Rome
Referee: Alberto Michelotti

Milan	Juventus

GK	1	(Italy) William Vecchi
DF	2	(Italy) Angelo Anquilletti	(substituted off) 93'
DF	3	(Italy) Giulio Zignoli
MF	4	(Italy) Dario Dolci
MF	5	(Germany) Karl-Heinz Schnellinger
MF	6	(Italy) Roberto Rosato (c)	(substituted off) 76'
RW	7	(Italy) Giuseppe Sabadini
CF	8	(Italy) Romeo Benetti
CF	9	(Italy) Giorgio Biasiolo
CF	10	(Italy) Luciano Chiarugi
LW	11	(Italy) Alberto Bigon
Substitutes:
MF		(Italy) Guido Magherini	(substituted in) 76'
MF		(Italy) Roberto Casone	(substituted in) 93'
Manager:
(Italy) Nereo Rocco

GK	1	(Italy) Dino Zoff
DF	2	(Italy) Luciano Spinosi
DF	3	(Italy) Gianpietro Marchetti
MF	4	(Italy) Antonello Cuccureddu
MF	5	(Italy) Silvio Longobucco	(substituted off) 64'
MF	6	(Italy) Sandro Salvadore (c)
RW	7	(Italy) Franco Causio
CF	8	(Italy) Fabio Capello
CF	9	(Italy) Pietro Anastasi
CF	10	(Italy) Roberto Bettega
LW	11	(Germany) Helmut Haller	(substituted off) 98'
Substitutes:
MF		(Italy) Giuseppe Furino	(substituted in) 64'
MF		(Italy) Gianluigi Savoldi	(substituted in) 98'
Manager:
(Czech Republic) Čestmír Vycpálek

== See also ==
- 1972–73 AC Milan season
- 1972–73 Juventus FC season
- Juventus FC–AC Milan rivalry

Played between same clubs:

- 1942 Coppa Italia final
- 1990 Coppa Italia final
- 2016 Coppa Italia final
- 2018 Coppa Italia final
