= 1973 European Cup Winners' Cup final =

- Match programme cover
- Event: 1972–73 European Cup Winners' Cup
Leeds United	Milan
(England)	(Italy)
0	1
- Date: 16 May 1973
- Venue: Kaftanzoglio Stadium, Thessaloniki
- Referee: Christos Michas (Greece)
- Attendance: 40,154

The 1973 European Cup Winners' Cup Final was the final football match of the 1972–73 European Cup Winners' Cup and the 13th European Cup Winners' Cup final. It was contested between Leeds United of England and Milan of Italy, and was held at Kaftanzoglio Stadium in Thessaloniki, Greece. Milan won the match 1–0.

The Greek crowd at the final reacted to perceived bias towards Milan by referee Christos Michas by throwing missiles during the victors' lap of honour, but despite protests, the result was not overturned. UEFA later banned Michas for life due to match fixing, although his role in this match was not investigated.

Leeds, who perceived referee Christos Michas to have made a number of unfair decisions, attempted to gain a replay but UEFA denied the request. Decades later Richard Corbett, then MEP for Yorkshire and the Humber, petitioned UEFA for a revocation of the Milan title.

== Route to the final ==
(England) Leeds United					(Italy) Milan			
Opponent	Agg.	1st leg	2nd leg		Opponent	Agg.	1st leg	2nd leg
(Turkey) Ankaragücü	2–1	1–1 (A)	1–0 (H)	First round	(Luxembourg) Red Boys Differdange	7–1	4–1 (A)	3–0 (H)
(East Germany) Carl Zeiss Jena	2–0	0–0 (A)	2–0 (H)	Second round	(Poland) Legia Warsaw	3–2	1–1 (A)	2–1 (a.e.t.) (H)
(Romania) Rapid București	8–1	5–0 (H)	3–1 (A)	Quarter-finals	(Soviet Union) Spartak Moscow	2–1	1–0 (A)	1–1 (H)
(Socialist Federal Republic of Yugoslavia) Hajduk Split	1–0	1–0 (H)	0–0 (A)	Semi-finals	(Czechoslovakia) Sparta Prague	2–0	1–0 (H)	1–0 (A)

== Match details ==
16 May 1973

Leeds United (England)	0–1	(Italy) Milan
	Report	Chiarugi 5'

Kaftanzoglio Stadium, Thessaloniki
Attendance: 40,154
Referee: Christos Michas (Greece)

Leeds United	Milan

GK	1	(Scotland) David Harvey
RB	2	(England) Paul Reaney (c)
CB	11	(Wales) Terry Yorath
CB	6	(England) Norman Hunter (red card) 90'
LB	3	(England) Trevor Cherry
RM	7	(Scotland) Peter Lorimer
CM	4	(England) Mick Bates
CM	5	(England) Paul Madeley
LM	10	(Scotland) Frank Gray	(substituted off) 54'
CF	8	(Scotland) Joe Jordan
CF	9	(England) Mick Jones
Substitutes:
CB	12	(Scotland) Gordon McQueen	(substituted on) 54'
FW	14	(England) Chris Galvin
Manager:
(England) Don Revie

GK	1	(Italy) Villiam Vecchi
SW	5	(Italy) Maurizio Turone
RB	2	(Italy) Giuseppe Sabadini
CB	4	(Italy) Angelo Anquilletti
CB	6	(Italy) Roberto Rosato	(substituted off) 59'
LB	3	(Italy) Giulio Zignoli
RM	7	(Italy) Riccardo Sogliano (red card) 90'
CM	8	(Italy) Romeo Benetti
LM	10	(Italy) Gianni Rivera (c)
CF	9	(Italy) Alberto Bigon
SS	11	(Italy) Luciano Chiarugi
Substitutes:
CB	14	(Italy) Dario Dolci	(substituted on) 59'
Manager:
(Italy) Nereo Rocco

== See also ==
- 1973 European Cup Final
- 1973 UEFA Cup Final
- Leeds United F.C. in European football
- A.C. Milan in European football
