= Crosato =

Crosato is a surname. Notable people with the surname include:

- Giovanni Battista Crosato (1686–1758), Italian painter
- Lisa Crosato, Australian opera soprano, musical theatre actor, and ballet dancer

== See also ==
- Rosato (surname)
