= Rosato =

Rosato may refer to:

- Rosato (surname), a surname of Italian origin
- Rosato (wine), a style of Italian rosé wine
