= Angelo Anquilletti =

Italian footballer (1943–2015)

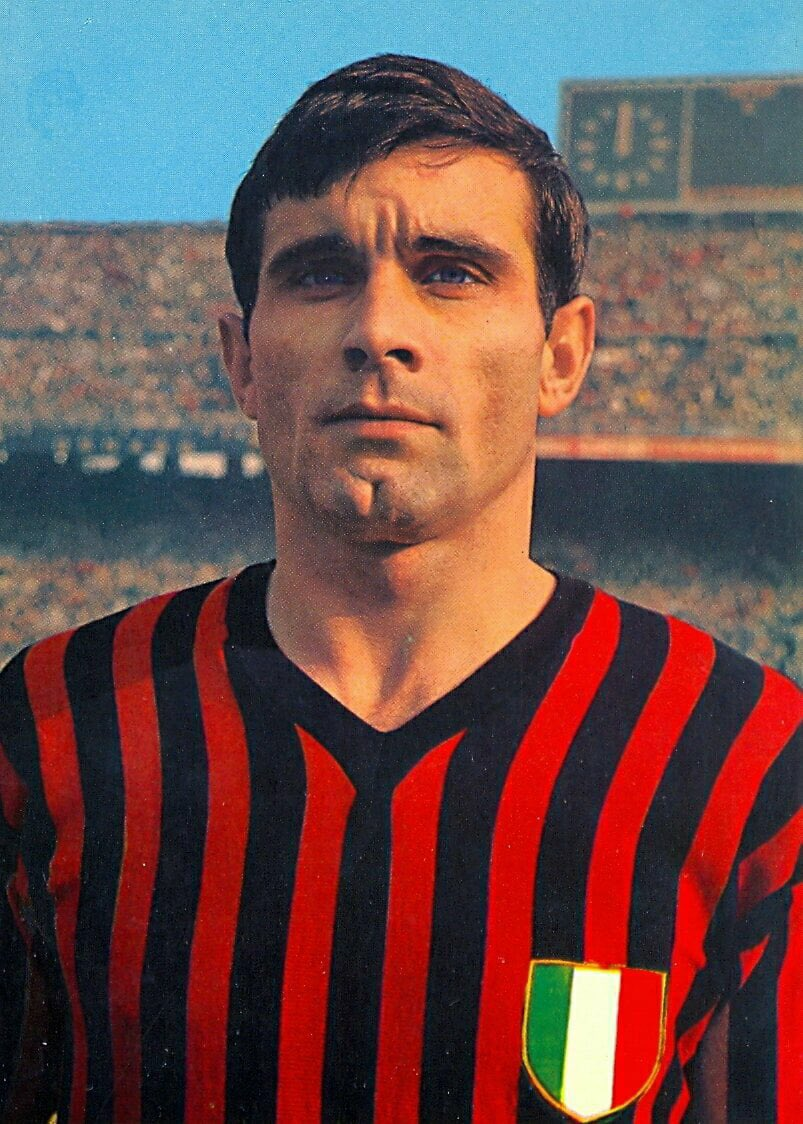
- Anquilletti with AC Milan in the 1968–69 season

Personal information
- Date of birth: 25 April 1943
- Place of birth: San Donato Milanese, Italy
- Date of death: 9 January 2015 (aged 71)
- Place of death: Milan, Italy
- Height: 1.75 m (5 ft 9 in)
- Position: Defender

Senior career*
Years	Team	Apps	(Gls)
1961–1964	Solbiatese	90	(0)
1964–1966	Atalanta	48	(0)
1966–1977	AC Milan	278	(0)
1977–1979	Monza	41	(0)
Total		457	(0)

International career
1969	Italy	2	(0)
Medal record
Men's football
Representing Italy (as player)
UEFA European Championship
Winner	1968 Italy
- * Club domestic league appearances and goals

Angelo Anquilletti (Italian pronunciation: [ˈandʒelo aŋkwilˈletti]; 25 April 1943 – 9 January 2015) was an Italian football defender. A tough yet fair player, Anquiletti was a successful right-sided full-back, who was known for his strength, energy, work-rate, positioning, marking ability, anticipation, and his ability to read the game; he also excelled in the air and was confident on the ball and at distributing it to teammates, which also enabled him to be deployed as a sweeper towards the end of his career. He is mostly remembered for his lengthy spell with AC Milan and for being a member of the Italian UEFA Euro 1968 winning squad. Anquiletti was known by the fans as "Angelo Anguilla" (Angelo the Eel), due to his man-marking ability, and wore the number 2 shirt throughout his successful Milan career.

== Club career ==
Anquiletti Started his career in Serie D with Solbiatese during the 1964–65 season. In 1964 he played with Atalanta in Serie A, making his debut on 16 November 1964, at the age of 21, in a 1–0 away win over Cagliari; he remained at the club for two seasons. From 1966 to 1977 played for AC Milan, where he achieved notable success, forming an impressive defensive line-up during his 11 seasons with the club alongside Cudicini, Trapattoni, Rosato, and Schnellinger, which was nicknamed the Maginot Line. He was notably part of their European Cup victory in 1969, also winning the 1967–68 Serie A title, two European Cup Winners' Cups (1967–68 and 1972–73), the 1969 Intercontinental Cup, and four Coppa Italia titles (1966–67, 1971–72, 1972–73, 1976–77). He notably scored two goals against Levski Sofia in the first leg of the first round of the victorious 1967–68 edition of the European Cup Winners' Cup. Overall, he made 418 appearances for Milan, and is the club's ninth all-time appearance holder; 278 of his appearances came in Serie A, 71 in the Coppa Italia, 63 in European Competitions, and 6 in other competitions. He ended his career with Monza, spending 2 more seasons in Serie B before retiring in 1979, at the age of 36.

Overall, he played 326 games in the Serie A for Atalanta and Milan, and 41 games in Serie B, although he was unable to score a goal in the Italian leagues throughout his career.

== International career ==
Anquiletti earned 2 caps for the Italy national football team, and was part of Italy's UEFA Euro 1968 squad that won the tournament on home soil under Valcareggi, despite not making an appearance throughout the cup. He made his international debut in January 1969, in a friendly tournament in Mexico which preceded the 1970 FIFA World Cup, making his only two appearances for Italy against Mexico that year. He struggled to find space in the national side due to the presence of Tarcisio Burgnich and Fabrizio Poletti in his role.

== Death ==
Anquiletti died on 9 January 2015, at the age of 71, after struggling with a long illness.

== Career statistics ==
=== Club ===
Club	Season	League		Cup		Europe		Other		Total	
Club	Season	Apps	Goals	Apps	Goals	Apps	Goals	Apps	Goals	Apps	Goals
Solbiatese	1961–62	21	0	-	-	-	-	-	-	21	0
Solbiatese	1962–63	33	0	-	-	-	-	-	-	33	0
Solbiatese	1963–64	36	0	-	-	-	-	-	-	36	0
Atalanta	1964–65	16	0	2	0	-	-	-	-	18	0
Atalanta	1965/66	32	0	3	0	-	-	-	-	35	0
AC Milan	1966–67	28	0	5	0	-	-	5	0	38	0
AC Milan	1967–68	30	0	10	0	10	2	-	-	50	2
AC Milan	1968–69	30	0	3	0	7	0	-	-	40	0
AC Milan	1969–70	26	0	3	0	3	0	3	0	35	0
AC Milan	1970–71	28	0	12	0	-	-	-	-	40	0
AC Milan	1971–72	28	0	10	0	10	0	-	-	48	0
AC Milan	1972–73	28	0	5	0	8	0	-	-	41	0
AC Milan	1973–74	29	0	3	0	11	0	-	-	43	0
AC Milan	1974–75	11	0	5	0	-	-	-	-	16	0
AC Milan	1975–76	22	0	10	0	8	0	-	-	40	0
AC Milan	1976–77	18	0	5	0	5	0	-	-	28	0
Monza	1977–78	32	0	3	0	-	-	-	-	35	0
Monza	1978–79	9	0	0	0	-	-	-	-	9	0
Total for Milan		278	0	71	0	62	2	8	0	419	2
Career totals		457	0	79	0	62	2	8	0	605	2

*European competitions include the UEFA Champions League, UEFA Cup Winners' Cup, UEFA Cup, and UEFA Super Cup

== Honours ==
AC Milan

- Serie A: 1967–68
- Coppa Italia: 1966–67, 1971–72, 1972–73, 1976–77
- European Cup: 1968–69
- UEFA Cup Winners' Cup: 1967–68, 1972–73
- Intercontinental Cup: 1969

Italy

- UEFA European Football Championship: 1968 (on the roster, did not play any games).

Individual

- AC Milan Hall of Fame
