= Sean Sogliano =

Italian footballer

Personal information
- Full name: Sean Luca Sogliano
- Date of birth: 28 February 1971 (age 55)
- Place of birth: Alessandria, Italy
- Height: 1.76 m (5 ft 9 1/2 in)
- Position: Defender

Team information
- Current team: Verona (director of football)

Senior career*
Years	Team	Apps	(Gls)
1988–1991	Varese	72	(0)
1991–1994	Ancona	73	(2)
1994–1996	Torino	27	(0)
1996–1997	Lucchese	34	(1)
1997–1998	Ravenna	25	(0)
1998–2003	Perugia	83	(0)
2003–2004	Napoli	6	(0)
2004	Ancona	11	(0)
- * Club domestic league appearances and goals

Sean Luca Sogliano (born 28 February 1971) is an Italian football director and former player, currently working for Serie A club Hellas Verona as the club's director of football.

He is the son of former footballer Riccardo Sogliano.

== Playing career ==
Born in Alessandria, Sogliano started his career with Serie C2 club Varese at the age of 18. In 1991, he joined Serie B outfit Ancona, with whom he won a historical first promotion to Serie A for the small club from Marche and made his personal top-flight debut in 1992. In 1994, he joined Torino, where he played a single season with little success. After a few minor league experiences with Lucchese and Ravenna, he returned to play at Serie A level with Perugia in 1998. In 2003, aged 32, Sogliano left Perugia to join Napoli, then in Serie B, in what turned to be the club's final season before being declared bankrupt; his experience in Naples proved to be rather unsuccessful, with only six appearances until January 2004, when he was sold to Serie A club Ancona. After playing 11 games with the Dorici, Sogliano retired from active football in June at the age of 33.

== Post-playing career ==
In the summer of 2004 Sogliano accepted to become general manager of Varese after the club was declared bankrupt and then admitted to the Eccellenza league (sixth level of Italian football) under a new ownership that also included his father Riccardo as vice-president and member of the consortium that controlled the club. Under his tenure as general manager, Sogliano was a key factor in acquiring many of the players that led the club back into professionalism through two consecutive promotions.

In 2008 entrepreneur Antonio Rosati took over the club from the previous owners but confirmed Sogliano as general manager: a few weeks after the beginning of the season, after a series of disappointing results, Sogliano agreed to remove Pietro Carmignani as head coach and hire Giuseppe Sannino as replacement. The appointment proved to be a turning point in the season, as well as in Varese's future fortunes, as the club won two successive promotions to Serie B in 2009 and 2010 under the new head coach, also thanks to Sogliano's interventions during the transfer market windows. In 2010–11, Varese gained national news as the team completed the regular season in fourth place and won a place in the promotion playoffs, then lost to fifth-placed Padova in the semi-finals.

Sogliano's impressive work at Varese became popular nationwide and led to a serious interest from Maurizio Zamparini, chairman and owner of ambitious Serie A club Palermo, who offered him the director of football position that was left vacant in November 2010 after the resignation of Walter Sabatini. On 8 June 2011, Palermo officially announced to have hired Sogliano as the club's new director of football. During his stay, Sogliano also appointed then-unknown youth coach Devis Mangia in charge of first team duties. He resigned on 2 November 2011 due to his strained relationship with Zamparini, as confirmed by the latter.

In June 2012 he was appointed as director of football at Serie B club Verona. In his first season in the new role, Verona won promotion to the top flight; in the second season, Sogliano was responsible for signing players such as Juan Iturbe, Rômulo and Luca Toni, who turned out being instrumental in the team's successful first season back in the Serie A.

In July 2015, he signed for newly promoted Serie A club Carpi as their new director of football, replacing the departing Cristiano Giuntoli; he left the club later on November of that same year due to disagreements with the board. He then moved at Genoa just a month later, signing as their new director of football.

In July 2016 he left Genoa for Bari. He left Bari after the 2017–18 Serie B, following the club's exclusion from the Italian football leagues.

On 3 June 2019 he was announced as the new director of football of Padova. On 23 January 2022, he was dismissed by Padova.

On 17 November 2022, Sogliano was hired by Serie A club Hellas Verona as their new director of football with immediate effect.
