= Roberto Casone =

Italian footballer and manager

Personal information
- Date of birth: 13 February 1951 (age 75)
- Place of birth: Suardi, Italy
- Height: 1.75 m (5 ft 9 in)
- Position: Midfielder

Youth career
- Milan

Senior career*
Years	Team	Apps	(Gls)
1969–1974	Milan	12	(0)
1971–1972	→ Sampdoria (loan)	22	(1)
1973–1974	→ Como (loan)	32	(2)
1974–1975	Arezzo	24	(2)
1975–1979	Ternana	85	(7)
1979–1981	Casale	52	(2)

International career
1971–1972	Italy U-21	2	(1)

Managerial career
- 1994–1995: Vogherese
- 2006–2007: San Carlo
- 2009–2010: Casale (youth)
- 2010–2011: Lomello
- 2011–2012: Arenzano
- * Club domestic league appearances and goals

Roberto Casone (born 13 February 1951 in Suardi) is an Italian professional football coach former of Arenzano and a former player, who played as a midfielder.

== Career ==
=== Player ===
He has played 4 seasons (34 games, 1 goal) in the Serie A for A.C. Milan and U.C. Sampdoria.

=== Coach ===
He has coached Vogherese, San Carlo, Casale (youth), Lomello and Arenzano

== Honours ==
Milan

- Coppa Italia winner: 1972–73.
- UEFA Cup Winners' Cup winner: 1972–73.
