= Rossato =

Rossato is a surname of Italian origin said to have come from the northern regions of Italy, not to be confused with Rosato another similar surname of Italian origin. Rossato is Latin for red man or man of red complexion. Due to large amounts of ethnic Italians migrating out of the country within recent history it is common to find this surname in other parts of the world with notable Italian minorities e.g Brazil or the United States. Notable people with the surname include:

- Adriano Rossato (born 1977), Brazilian footballer
- Altamiro Rossato (1925–2014), Brazilian Roman Catholic prelate
- Beatrice Rossato (born 1996), Italian racing cyclist
- Nivaldo Luiz Rossato (born 1951), commander of the Brazilian Air Force
