= Riccardo Sogliano =

Italian footballer

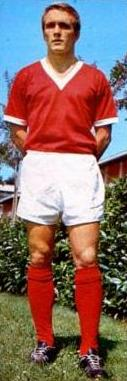
- Sogliano with Varese in 1966

Personal information
- Date of birth: 4 March 1942 (age 84)
- Place of birth: Alessandria, Italy
- Height: 1.72 m (5 ft 8 in)
- Position: Midfielder

Senior career*
Years	Team	Apps	(Gls)
1960–1961	Siena	17	(2)
1961–1962	Biellese	22	(6)
1962–1963	Novese	31	(8)
1963–1965	Alessandria	44	(2)
1965–1971	A.S. Varese 1910	157	(3)
1971–1974	A.C. Milan	57	(3)
- * Club domestic league appearances and goals

Riccardo Sogliano (born 4 March 1942) is an Italian former professional footballer who played as a midfielder.

== Playing career ==
Sogliano played for seven seasons (144 games, 6 goals) in the Italian Serie A for Varese and A.C. Milan.

== After retirement ==
From 2004 to 2008, Sogliano was the owner of A.S. Varese 1910. In 2015, he was charged with tax fraud.

== Personal life ==
Sogliano was born in Alessandria. His son Sean Sogliano played in Serie A for several seasons.

== Honours ==
AC Milan

- Coppa Italia: 1971–72, 1972–73
- UEFA Cup Winners' Cup: 1972–73
