= Dario Dolci =

Italian footballer (born 1947)

Personal information
- Date of birth: 5 March 1947 (age 79)
- Place of birth: Marostica, Italy
- Height: 1.80 m (5 ft 11 in)
- Position: Defender

Senior career*
Years	Team	Apps	(Gls)
1965–1968	Modena	37	(0)
1968–1972	Varese	100	(0)
1972–1974	Milan	18	(0)
1974–1975	Ternana	21	(0)
1975–1977	L.R. Vicenza	60	(1)
1977–1978	SPAL	3	(0)
1978–1979	Savona	22	(0)
- * Club domestic league appearances and goals

Dario Dolci (born 5 March 1947) is a retired Italian professional footballer who played as a defender.

He played six seasons (105 games, no goals) in the Serie A for Varese F.C., A.C. Milan and Ternana Calcio.

== Honours ==
Milan

- Coppa Italia winner: 1972–73.
- UEFA Cup Winners' Cup winner: 1972–73.
