= Roberto Rosato =

Italian footballer (1943–2010)

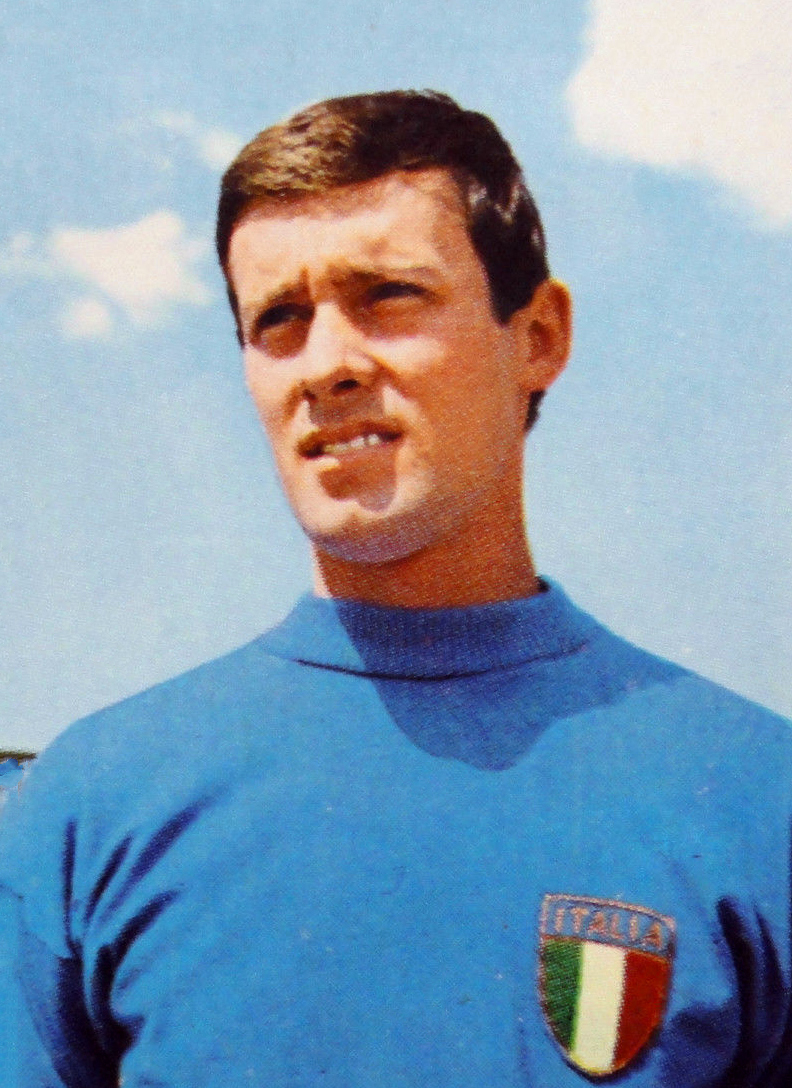
- Rosato in 1969

Personal information
- Date of birth: 18 August 1943
- Place of birth: Chieri, Kingdom of Italy
- Date of death: 20 June 2010 (aged 66)
- Place of death: Chieri, Italy
- Height: 1.76 m (5 ft 9 in)
- Position: Defender

Senior career*
Years	Team	Apps	(Gls)
1960–1966	Torino	131	(4)
1966–1973	AC Milan	187	(5)
1973–1977	Genoa	84	(1)
1977–1979	Aosta	48	(1)
Total		450	(11)

International career
1965–1972	Italy	37	(0)
Medal record
Men's football
Representing Italy (as player)
UEFA European Championship
Winner	1968 Italy
- * Club domestic league appearances and goals

Roberto Rosato (Italian pronunciation: [roˈbɛrto roˈzaːto]; 18 August 1943 – 20 June 2010) was an Italian footballer, who played as a defender.

He played as a centre-back and was known for his physical style of defending.

Rosato played for four different Italian clubs throughout his career, but is mainly remembered for his successful stint with A.C. Milan, where he won several domestic and international titles. At international level, he represented Italy in two FIFA World Cups, reaching the final in 1970, and won UEFA Euro 1968.

== Club career ==
Rosato played for 15 seasons (351 games, 10 goals) in the Serie A for Torino (1960–66), A.C. Milan (1966–1973) and Genoa (1973–1977), before moving to Aosta (1977–79), playing in Serie D for two seasons before officially retiring in 1979. He made his Serie A debut with Torino, in a 1–1 away draw against Fiorentina on 2 April 1961. Rosato is mostly remembered for his highly successful period with Milan, where he won several domestic and international trophies (one Serie A A title, three Coppa Italia titles, one European Cup, two UEFA Cup Winners' Cups, and one Intercontinental Cup), forming a formidable back-line alongside Cudicini, Schnellinger, Anquilletti, and Trapattoni. He made his Milan debut on 4 September 1966, in a 3–0 away Serie A win over Pisa; in total he made 269 appearances with the club, scoring 8 goals, 5 of which came in Serie A in 187 appearances.

== International career ==
Rosato also played 37 matches for the Italy national team from 1965 to 1973. An important member of the Italy national side, he gave one of his best performances during his debut under manager Edmondo Fabbri in 1966, in a 1–1 away draw against West Germany; after the match, he was dubbed the “Hammer of Hamburg” (Il Martello d'Amburgo) by the media, due to his tenacity and determination throughout the match. He participated in two World Cups (1966 and 1970), where is widely remembered for an important goal-line clearance on Gerd Müller in Italy's 4–3 semi-final win over West Germany, which is known as "the Match of the Century". Rosato was also a member of the team that lost 4–1 to Brazil in the 1970 FIFA World Cup Final; after the tournament he was elected the best central defender of the tournament. At the end of the game he swapped shirts with Pelé. He sold the shirt for a record £157,750 at auction in 2002. was also part of the Italian team that won the 1968 UEFA European Football Championship and the Gold Medal at the 1963 Mediterranean Games.

== Style of play ==
Rosato was a centre-back who played primarily as a man-marking defender. He was noted for his physicality, tackling ability, and positional awareness. Rosato was also comfortable on the ball, demonstrating composure, balance, and technical ability, and he often served as a vocal presence in organizing the defense.

== Personal life ==
Rosato was frequently known by his team-mates and the media as "Angel Face" (Faccia d'Angelo) under manager Nereo Rocco, due to his delicate, handsome physical features, which were thought to contrast with his determination and ruggedness on the pitch. Rosato is born on the same day as his Milan team-mate and "twin", as he was known, Gianni Rivera.

Rosato died on 20 June 2010, at the age of 66, after struggling with a lengthy illness; after news of his death was aired, the Italian team wore black armbands in memory of Rosato in their 2010 FIFA World Cup game against New Zealand later that day.

== Honours ==
Milan

- Serie A: 1967–68
- Coppa Italia: 1966–67, 1971–72, 1972–73
- European Cup: 1968–69
- UEFA Cup Winners' Cup: 1967–68, 1972–73
- Intercontinental Cup: 1969

Italy

- UEFA European Football Championship: 1968
- Mediterranean Games: 1963

Individual

- A.C. Milan Hall of Fame
- Medaglia d'oro al valore atletico
