= Nereo Rocco =

Italian football manager (1912–1979)

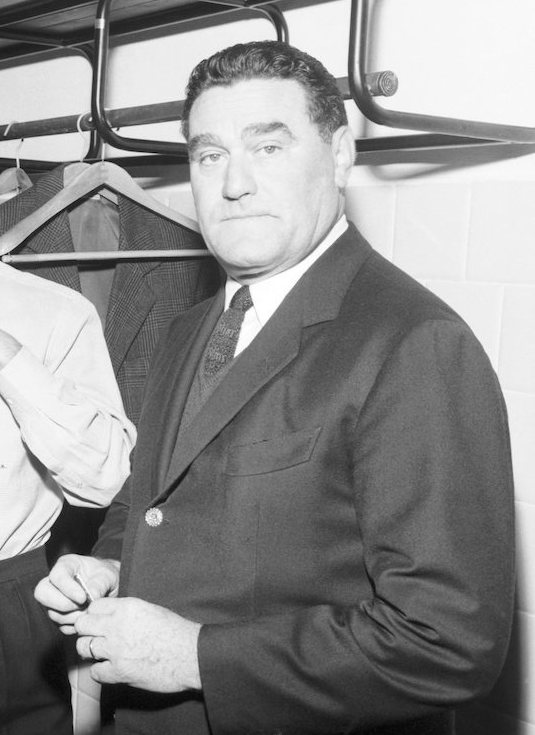
- Rocco in 1967

Personal information
- Date of birth: 20 May 1912
- Place of birth: Trieste, Austro-Hungarian Empire
- Date of death: 20 February 1979 (aged 66)
- Place of death: Trieste, Italy
- Positions: Midfielder; forward

Youth career
- 1927–1930: Triestina

Senior career*
Years	Team	Apps	(Gls)
1930–1937	Triestina	232	(66)
1937–1940	Napoli	52	(7)
1940–1942	Padova	47	(14)
1942–1943	94° Reparto Distretto Trieste		
1943–1944	Libertas Trieste	14	(1)
1944–1945	Padova		

International career
1934	Italy	1	(0)

Managerial career
- 1947–1950: Triestina
- 1950–1953: Treviso
- 1953–1954: Triestina
- 1954–1961: Padova
- 1960: Italy Olympic
- 1961–1963: AC Milan
- 1963–1967: Torino
- 1967–1972: AC Milan
- 1973: AC Milan
- 1974–1975: Fiorentina
- 1977: AC Milan
- * Club domestic league appearances and goals

Nereo Rocco (Italian pronunciation: [neˈrɛːo ˈrɔkko]; 20 May 1912 – 20 February 1979) was an Italian football player and manager. Regarded as one of the greatest managers of all time, he is famous for having been one of the most successful head coaches in Italy, winning several domestic and international titles during his tenure with AC Milan. At Padova, he was one of the first proponents of catenaccio in the country.

== Playing career ==
=== Club ===
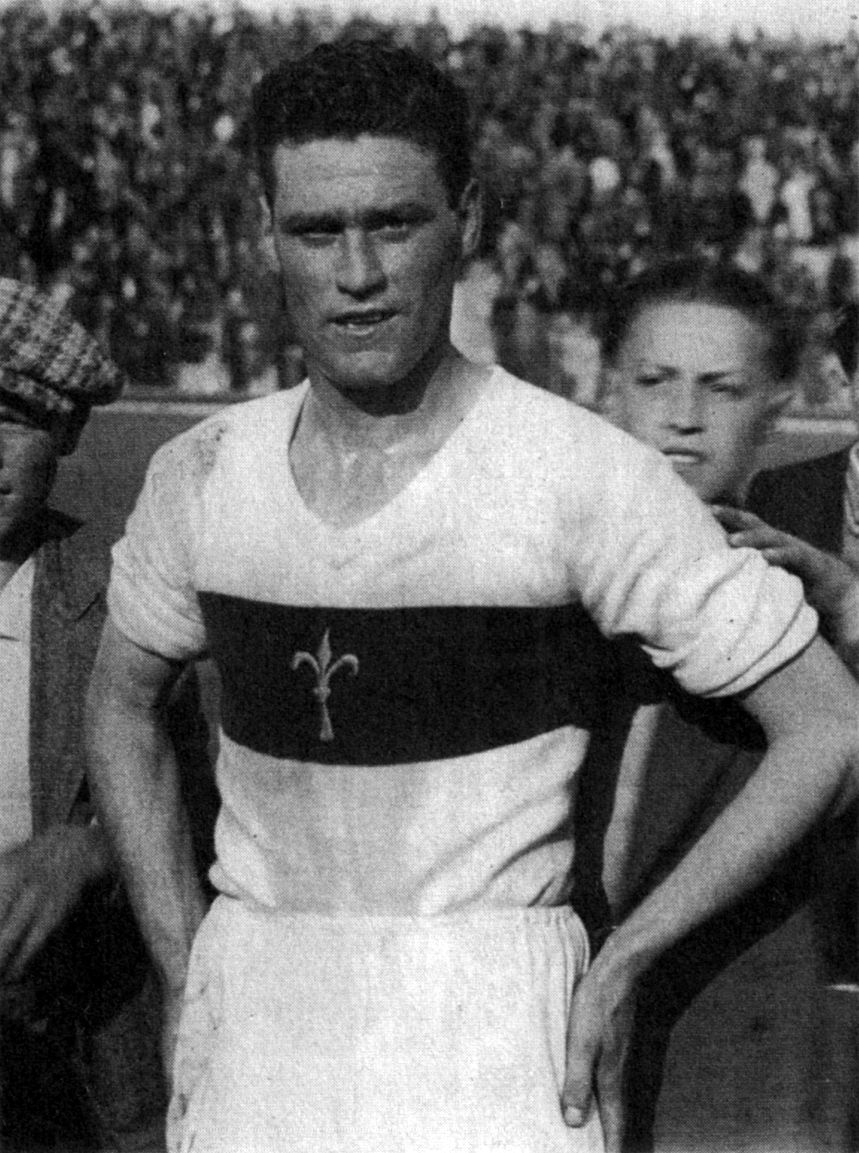
Rocco playing for Triestina in the 1930s

Rocco played as a winger in midfield; he had a modest playing career, spent mainly with clubs like Triestina, Napoli and Padova. He played 287 Serie A matches within 11 seasons, scoring 69 goals. Rocco was also capped one time for the Italy national team.

=== International ===
Rocco made an appearance for the Italy national team on one occasion: in Vittorio Pozzo's selection in the 1934 FIFA World Cup qualification match, on 25 March 1934 against Greece, a 4–0 home victory.

== Coaching career ==
=== Triestina ===
Rocco made his coaching debut for Triestina in 1947. He obtained a surprising second place in Serie A, which is still the highest result ever reached by the team. He left Triestina a few years later because of disagreements with the club chairmanship. In 1951 he briefly coached Treviso, then returning to Triestina.

=== Padova ===
In 1953 Rocco signed as coach of Serie B team Padova, being able to avoid a relegation and obtaining promotion into Serie A the following season. The Serie A period of Rocco's Padova is still remembered as the team's most successful in their history, despite having a small team, they were able to take third place during the 1957–58 season. During his time with Padova, he also coached the Italian team at the 1960 Summer Olympics in Rome, alongside Giuseppe Viani, where they finished in fourth place.

=== A.C. Milan ===
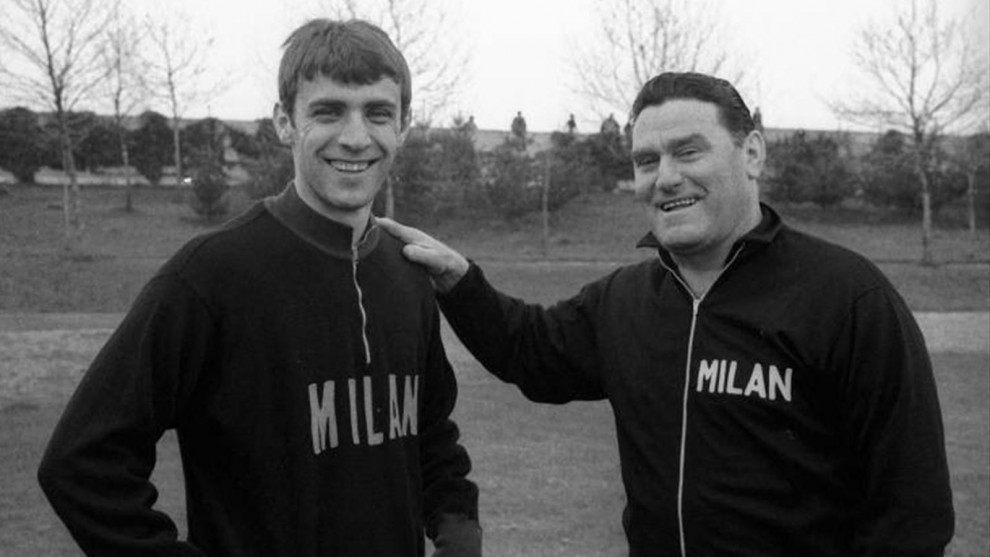
Pierino Prati and Rocco in training with A.C. Milan in the 1967–68 season

In 1961, Rocco was appointed as new A.C. Milan coach, starting one of the most successful periods for the rossoneri: he built a hard-working and defensively sound side around the team's young star playmaker, Gianni Rivera, which complemented the midfielders' creative playing style; Rocco formed an important relationship with Rivera throughout his career, and together, they played a key role in the club's successes, winning the Italian league in 1962 and the European Cup in 1963. After a good stint at Torino, where he obtained the best results since the disappearance of the Grande Torino, in 1967 Rocco returned to Milan, where he immediately won another scudetto and the Cup Winners' Cup.

He left Milan in 1973, after having won also another European Cup in 1969, an Intercontinental Cup, two Italian Cups and another Cup Winners' Cup. After one year in Fiorentina, Rocco decided to end his coaching career in 1975. In 1977, he was appointed by Milan as Technical Director and Assistant of coach Nils Liedholm. Rocco is Milan's longest-serving manager, managing the club for 459 matches (323 as head coach and 136 as technical director).

== Style of management ==
"Let's really hope not!"

— A famous response that Rocco was known for using during his spell at Padova whenever an opponent said to him: "May the best team win."

Regarded as one of the greatest managers of all time, Rocco was one of first proponents of catenaccio in Italy, and used the tactic to great success; drawing from Karl Rappan's tactics, his teams made use of a sweeper, who would sit behind the defensive line and clear the ball away, often using a 1–3–3–3 formation. His teams were known for their work-rate and physicality, as well as their simple but effective and pragmatic tactical strategies, namely their defensive strength, ability to counter–attack quickly with long balls, and score goals after winning back possession, rather than for being aesthetically pleasing to watch. During his time with Milan, he made use of Rivera as the team's playmaker in midfield, who took on the creative responsibilities of the team. He was known to be an excellent motivator, and developed strong personal relationships with his players in order to create a good team environment and foster a winning mentality, often discussing the team's tactics and the players man–marking roles over dinner rather than at a white–board during training sessions. In addition to his tactical intelligence, Rocco was also known for his charismatic personality, leadership, and sense of humour, despite his shy personality, and was known for being a very animated figure on the bench during matches. He also became popular for his quips, which he would often say to his players and journalists. Rocco, popularly known as El Paròn (Triestin for The Master), was also popular for his strong use of his native Triestine dialect. Former Parma manager Nevio Scala, who played under Rocco, was inspired by Rocco's charisma as a manager, and for giving his players more freedom by placing less importance on tactics and set plays during training.

== Death and legacy ==
Rocco died on 20 February 1979, aged 66, in his hometown Trieste.

On 18 October 1992, a new stadium in Trieste, named after Rocco, was inaugurated.

Rocco's tactics heavily influenced manager Giovanni Trapattoni, who became one of the main proponents of the zona mista ("mixed zone," in Italian), or gioco all'italiana, which drew elements from both man-to-man marking systems such as Italian catenaccio, and zonal-marking systems such as Dutch total football.

== Managerial statistics ==
As of match played 15 June 2025

Managerial record by team and tenure
Team	Nat	From	To	Record							
Team	Nat	From	To	G	W	D	L	GF	GA	GD	Win %
Padova	(Italy)	8 March 1954	30 June 1961	264	109	68	87	362	328	+34	41.29
AC Milan	(Italy)	1 July 1961	30 May 1963	94	54	21	19	200	90	+110	57.45
Torino	(Italy)	1 June 1963	30 May 1967	160	56	66	38	183	141	+42	35.00
AC Milan	(Italy)	1 June 1967	February 1974	301	160	95	46	465	229	+236	53.16
ACF Fiorentina	(Italy)	1 June 1974	30 May 1975	41	16	15	10	49	38	+11	39.02
AC Milan	(Italy)	October 1975	30 May 1976	42	20	11	11	60	41	+19	47.62
AC Milan	(Italy)	February 1977	30 May 1977	22	10	8	4	36	19	+17	45.45
Total				924	425	284	215	1,355	886	+469	46.00

== Honours ==
=== Manager ===
AC Milan

- Serie A: 1961–62, 1967–68
- Coppa Italia: 1971–72, 1972–73, 1976–77
- European Cup: 1962–63, 1968–69
- UEFA Cup Winners' Cup: 1967–68, 1972–73
- Intercontinental Cup: 1969

Individual

- Seminatore d'Oro: 1962–63
- Italian Football Hall of Fame: 2012
- France Football 17th Greatest Manager of All Time: 2019
- World Soccer 36th Greatest Manager of All Time: 2013
