= Rosato (surname) =

Rosato is an Italian surname, not to be confused with Rossato. Notable people with the surname include:

- Clorinda Rosato (1913–1985), Brazilian composer and pianist
- Cristina Rosato (born 1983), Canadian actress
- Genesia Rosato (born 1957), British ballerina
- Ken Rosato (born 1967), American television journalist and newsanchor
- Roberto Rosato (1943–2010), Italian football player
- Sal Rosato (1918–1959), American football player
- Tony Rosato (1954–2017), Italian-Canadian actor
