= Lisa Crosato =

Lisa Crosato is an Australian-born opera soprano, musical theatre actor, and ballet dancer based in the United Kingdom.

== Biography ==
Crosato was born in Australia and is based in the United Kingdom. In 2001, she performed in the Andrew Lloyd Webber tribute Masterpiece: Live From the Great Hall of the People, in Beijing, which was a televised concert and was recorded for CD and DVD release. In June 2003, she took the role of 'Good Fairy' in The Australian Ballet production of Wild Swans at the Victorian Arts Centre in Melbourne. On 11 October 2008, Crosato sang soprano for An Evening of Schubert with the Midland Festival Chorus and Orchestra of the Swan at Worcester Cathedral.
