= Guido Magherini =

Italian former footballer (born 1951)

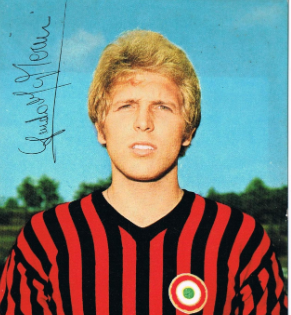

Personal information
- Date of birth: 2 July 1951 (age 75)
- Place of birth: Florence, Italy
- Height: 1.80 m (5 ft 11 in)
- Position: Midfielder

Senior career*
Years	Team	Apps	(Gls)
1970–1973	Milan	4	(0)
1970–1971	→ Lazio (loan)	12	(0)
1973–1974	Arezzo	28	(5)
1974–1975	Brindisi	33	(4)
1975–1976	Palermo	34	(11)
1976–1977	Ascoli	35	(2)
1977–1978	Cagliari	27	(8)
1978–1980	Palermo	39	(7)

International career
1969–1971	Italy U-21	4	(0)

Managerial career
- 1984–1986: Rondinella
- * Club domestic league appearances and goals

Guido Magherini (born 2 July 1951 in Florence) is an Italian former footballer who played as a midfielder. He played 4 seasons (16 games without scoring) in Serie A for Lazio and A.C. Milan, and made nearly 200 appearances in Serie B. He represented Italy at under-21 level.

His playing career ended with a three-and-a-half-year ban from football received for his involvement in the Totonero 1980 match-fixing scandal. Later, as manager of Rondinella Calcio, he was involved in another match-fixing scandal, Totonero 1986, for which he received a five-year ban from football.

== Honours ==
Milan

- Coppa Italia winner: 1972–73.
- European Cup Winners' Cup winner: 1972–73.
