= Villiam Vecchi =

Italian footballer and coach (1948–2022)

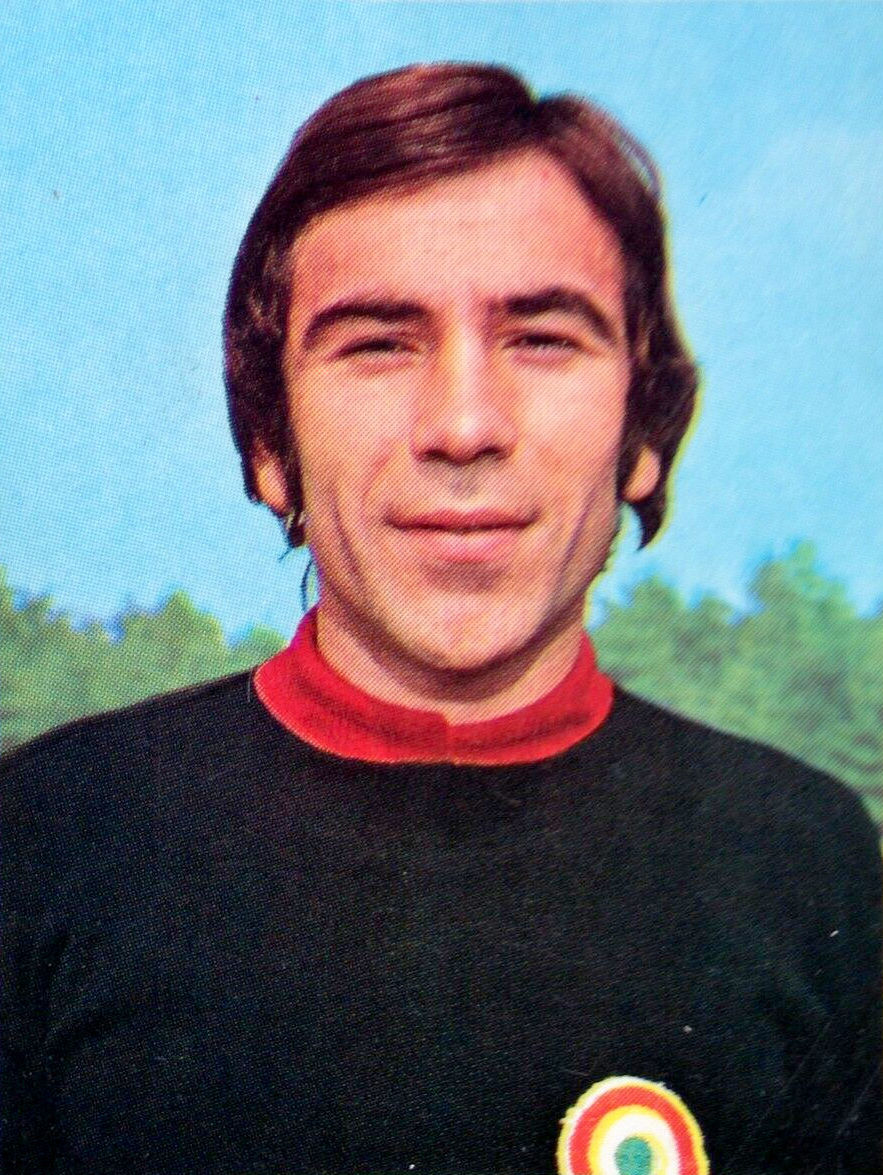
- Vecchi with AC Milan in 1973

Personal information
- Date of birth: 28 December 1948
- Place of birth: Scandiano, Italy
- Date of death: 3 August 2022 (aged 73)
- Place of death: Reggio Emilia, Italy
- Height: 1.76 m (5 ft 9 in)
- Position: Goalkeeper

Senior career*
Years	Team	Apps	(Gls)
1967–1974	AC Milan	46	(0)
1974–1976	Cagliari	26	(0)
1976–1981	Como	147	(0)
1981–1982	SPAL	33	(0)
Total		252	(0)

International career
1969–1970	Italy U21	3	(0)

Managerial career
- 1995–1996: Reggiana (goalkeeper coach)
- 1996–1998: Parma (goalkeeper coach)
- 1999–2001: Juventus (goalkeeper coach)
- 2001–2013: AC Milan (goalkeeper coach)
- 2013–2015: Real Madrid (goalkeeper coach)
- * Club domestic league appearances and goals

Villiam Vecchi (28 December 1948 – 3 August 2022) was an Italian footballer who played as a goalkeeper and later worked as a goalkeeping coach.

== Club career ==
Born in Scandiano, Reggio Emilia, Vecchi played with AC Milan from 1967 to 1974, and joined Como in 1976. In his five years with the club, Como endured a rollercoaster ride through Serie B and Serie C1 before making the top flight in 1980, where they remained as he departed after the 1980–81 campaign; Como were relegated back to Serie B the following season.

== Coaching career ==
Vecchi has the distinction of having trained both Dida and Gianluigi Buffon, who were two of the best goalkeepers in the world during the 2000s; he coached the latter during a stint with Parma, under the helm of head coach Carlo Ancelotti, while he trained the former during his time with AC Milan, once again under Ancelotti.

In 2013, Vecchi was announced as the new goalkeeper coach for Real Madrid; under Italian manager Carlo Ancelotti, he trained Iker Casillas, Diego López, Keylor Navas, and Pacheco during his spell with the club. On 25 May 2015, Vecchi left his job at the Spanish side following club president Florentino Pérez's decision to sack Ancelotti who had failed to win a major tournament in his second season with the club.
