= Romeo Benetti =

Italian footballer (born 1945)

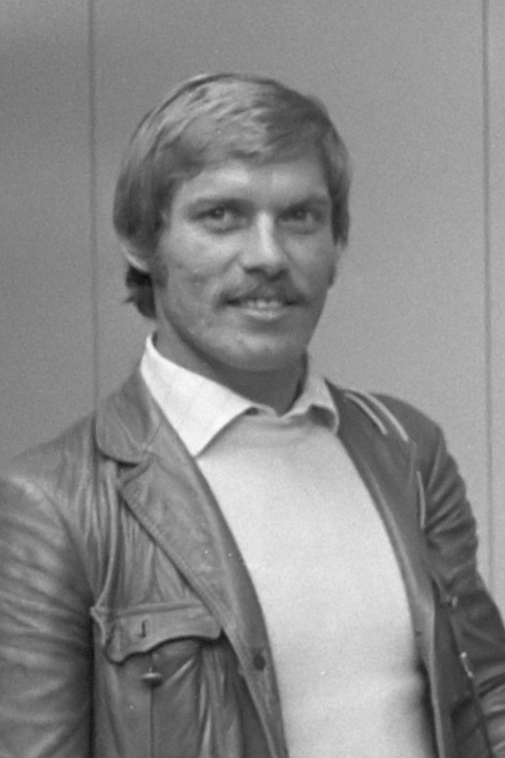
- Benetti in 1974

Personal information
- Full name: Romeo Benetti
- Date of birth: 20 October 1945 (age 81)
- Place of birth: Albaredo d'Adige, Italy
- Height: 5 ft 9 in (1.76 m)
- Position: Midfielder

Senior career*
Years	Team	Apps	(Gls)
1963–1964	Bolzano	31	(10)
1964–1965	Siena	31	(7)
1965–1967	Taranto	63	(11)
1967–1968	Palermo	35	(2)
1968–1969	Juventus	24	(1)
1969–1970	Sampdoria	27	(2)
1970–1976	AC Milan	170	(32)
1976–1979	Juventus	83	(12)
1979–1981	AS Roma	27	(1)
Total		491	(78)

International career
1971–1980	Italy	55	(2)
- * Club domestic league appearances and goals

Romeo Benetti (Italian pronunciation: [roˈmɛːo beˈnetti]; born 20 October 1945) is an Italian professional footballer who played as a defensive midfielder. A tenacious and intimidating player, Benetti played for several Italian clubs throughout his career, winning titles with AC Milan, Juventus and AS Roma. At international level, he represented the Italy national football team on 55 occasions between 1971 and 1980, and took part at the 1974 and 1978 FIFA World Cups, as well as UEFA Euro 1980, achieving fourth-place finishes in the latter two tournaments.

== Club career ==
After winning the 1967–68 Serie B title with Palermo, Benetti started his Serie A career in 1968 with Juventus, making 24 appearances and scoring a goal during his first season with the club. However, he did not remain at the club for long, and he joined Sampdoria on loan during the next season. His breakthrough came in the 1970–71 Serie A season, after joining AC Milan in 1970, helping the club to three consecutive second-place finishes in the league between 1970 and 1973. During his time at the club, he won the 1972–73 European Cup Winners' Cup, as well as two Coppa Italia trophies during the 1971–72 and 1972–73 seasons, later being named the club's captain, inheriting the armband from teammate Gianni Rivera. He also scored a memorable long-range goal in the Milan Derby against rivals Inter in March 1973.

In 1976, he returned to Juventus and won the 1976–77 and 1977–78 Serie A titles, as well as the 1976–77 UEFA Cup, and the Coppa Italia during the 1978–79 season. As his career came to an end he transferred to Roma in 1979, where he remained until 1981, winning two more consecutive Coppa Italia titles before retiring.

== International career ==
Benetti won 55 caps for Italy between 1971 and 1980, scoring 2 goals throughout his international career. He made his debut on 25 September 1971 against Mexico. He was member of the Italian squads that took part in the 1974 FIFA World Cup, and also in the 1978 FIFA World Cup, where he wore the number 10 shirt as Italy finished in fourth place; Benetti scored a goal from outside the area in the first round of the tournament, in a 3–1 victory over Hungary. He also took part at the 1980 UEFA European Championship with his country, on home soil, where he helped his team to the semi-finals, eventually finishing the tournament in fourth place once again; he made his final international appearance in the third-place match, which ended in a penalty shoot-out defeat to Czechoslovakia following a 1–1 draw after extra-time, although Benetti was able to net his penalty in the shoot-out. He was voted into Italy's all-time world cup team by website PlanetWorldCup.com and its members.

== Style of play ==
Nicknamed Panzer (tank), El Tigre (the tiger), and Roccia (rock), Benetti was a tenacious, mobile, athletic, and complete midfielder, who was known in particular for his physical strength, stamina, charisma, determination, consistency, and leadership as footballer, as well as the trademark moustache that he bore for most of his career. Although he was initially deployed as a winger, he usually played as a central or defensive midfielder, and his hard-tackling style of play in this role epitomised the catenaccio tactics made famous by Italy during the 1970s. Despite being a predominantly defensive-minded player, he was also known for his goal-scoring ability from midfield, due to his powerful and accurate striking ability from distance. Furthermore, Benetti also possessed good technique and distribution, which enabled him to function as a deep-lying playmaker at times, and start attacking plays and create goalscoring opportunities after winning back the ball, in particular when playing in teams that lacked a true midfield playmaker. In 2007, he was voted in at number 30 in a list of Football's 50 Greatest Hardmen by The Times online.

== Honours ==
Juventus

- Serie A: 1976–77, 1977–78
- UEFA Cup: 1976–77
- Coppa Italia: 1978–79

AC Milan

- Coppa Italia: 1971–72, 1972–73
- UEFA Cup Winners Cup: 1972–73

AS Roma

- Coppa Italia: 1979–80, 1980–81

Palermo

- Serie B: 1967–68

Italy

- FIFA World Cup: 1978 (fourth place)
- UEFA European Championship: 1980 (fourth place)
