= Luciano Chiarugi =

Italian footballer

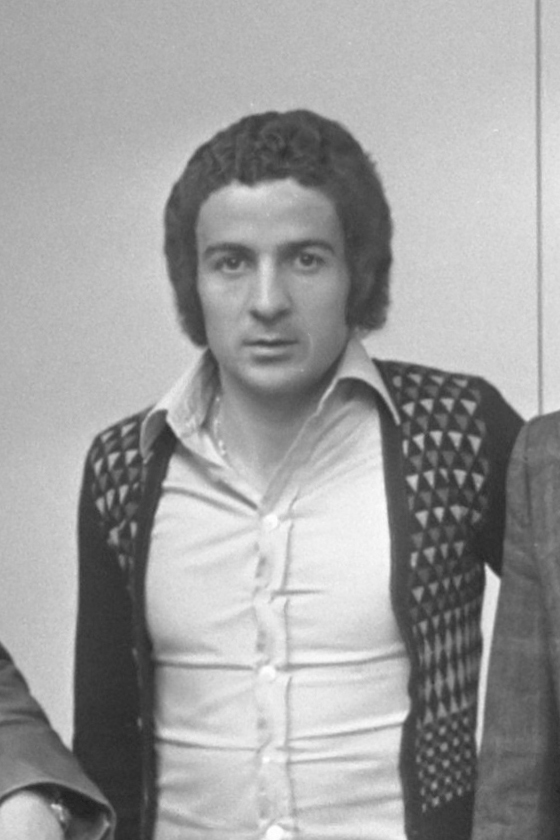
- Chiarugi (Amsterdam, 1974)

Personal information
- Date of birth: 13 January 1947 (age 79)
- Place of birth: Ponsacco, Italy
- Position: Forward

Senior career*
Years	Team	Apps	(Gls)
1965–1972	Fiorentina	139	(33)
1972–1976	A.C. Milan	104	(37)
1976–1978	Napoli	42	(7)
1978–1979	Sampdoria	30	(5)
1979–1980	Bologna	13	(3)
1980–1982	Rimini	13	(1)
1982–1983	Rondinella	?	(?)
1983–1985	Massese	38	(9)

International career
1969–1974	Italy	3	(0)

Managerial career
- 1993: Fiorentina (caretaker)
- 2001: Fiorentina (caretaker)
- 2002: Fiorentina (caretaker)
- 2007–2008: Poggibonsi
- * Club domestic league appearances and goals

Luciano Chiarugi (Italian pronunciation: [luˈtʃaːno kjaˈruːdʒi]; born 13 January 1947) is an Italian football manager and former player who played as a forward.

== Club career ==
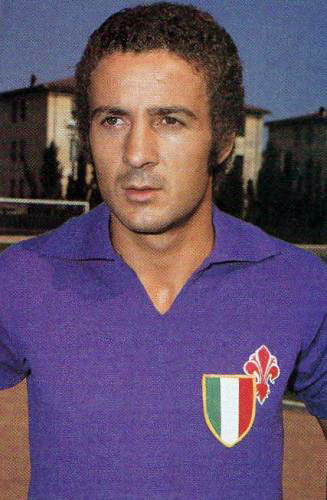
Chiarugi at Fiorentina in 1969

Born in Ponsacco, Province of Pisa, Chiarugi started his career with Fiorentina, being part of the lineup that won the 1968–69 Serie A title. After seven seasons with the viola, Chiarugi moved to A.C. Milan in 1972, being instrumental to the rossoneri triumph in the 1972–73 European Cup Winners' Cup, won thanks to a goal by him in the final match against Leeds United, finishing the competition as top scorer.

It was November 24, 1974 when Chiarugi surprised the Ascoli goalkeeper, in a league match. He scored for Milan the last Olympic goal until Christian Pulisic's attempt during Champions League game in October 2024 against Club Brugge.

In 1976, he was sold to Napoli in an exchange bid with Giorgio Braglia, with whom he shared the same nickname: Cavallo Pazzo ("Crazy" or "Mad Horse", in Italian). He played two seasons with the azzurri, winning a Coppa Italia and an Anglo-Italian Cup. He played for Serie B team Sampdoria in 1978–79, and then back to Serie A with Bologna the following season. After spells with minor league teams Rimini, Rondinella and Massese, Chiarugi retired from football in 1986.

== International career ==
Chiarugi also gained three caps for the Italy national football team, making his debut on 22 November 1969 in a 3–0 win over East Germany.

== Style of play ==
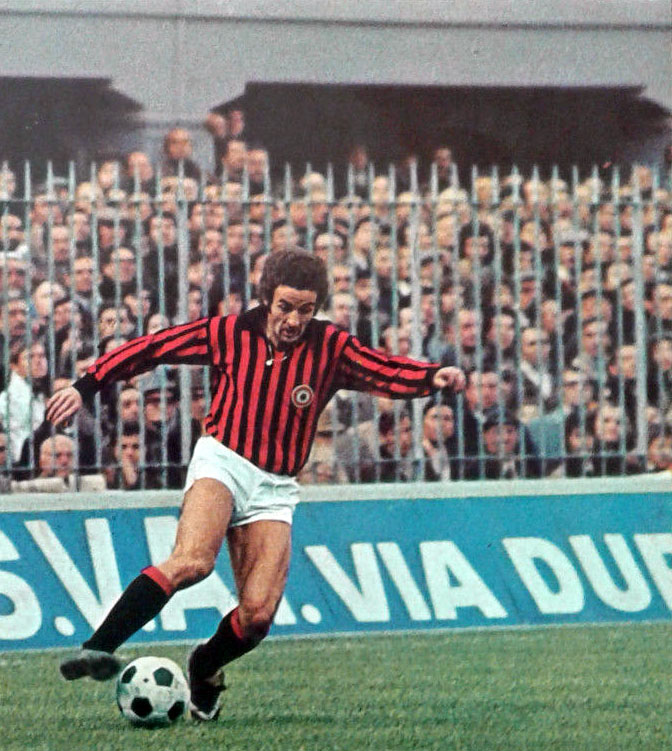
Chiarugi in action with A.C. Milan at San Siro in 1972–1973 season

Known in Italian football for his impetuous nature, pace and technique, which gained him the nickname Cavallo Pazzo (Crazy Horse), Chiarugi was a quick, energetic, and highly creative forward with an eye for goal and excellent dribbling skills, known for his individualistic playing style, as well as his use of elaborate feints and nutmegs to beat opponents. He was also known for his accurate striking and crossing ability, and was effective from set-pieces; this allowed him to play both as a striker, or as a winger on either flank. However, despite his talent, he was also popularly considered as a diver, causing the Italian media to create the Italian neologism chiarugismo, a synonym of "football diving", after his name.

== Coaching career ==
After his retirement as a player in 1986, Chiarugi joined the Fiorentina youth team coaching staff. In his career, he served as Fiorentina's Caretaker manager three times. Late into the 1992–93 season, Chiarugi (jointly with Giancarlo Antognoni) replaced Aldo Agroppi with little fortune, as he did not manage to save them from relegation to Serie B after 54 consecutive seasons in the top flight. In February 2001, following the dismissal of Fatih Terim, Chiarugi was installed as caretaker coach for a single match, a 2–1 loss to Bari, before the appointment of Roberto Mancini. Following the departure of Ottavio Bianchi, Chiarugi was appointed again as caretaker coach during the dramatic 2001–02 season, which ended with relegation to Serie B and the successive club cancellation due to financial troubles, which ultimately led to Fiorentina's bankruptcy.

On 14 November 2007, he was announced as the new head coach of Tuscan Serie C2 side Poggibonsi. He was sacked in September 2008 due to poor results.

== Honours ==
=== Club ===
Fiorentina

- Coppa Italia: 1965–66
- Mitropa Cup: 1965–66
- Serie A: 1968–69

Milan

- Coppa Italia: 1972–73
- European Cup Winners' Cup: 1972–73

Napoli

- Anglo-Italian League Cup: 1976

=== Individual ===
- UEFA Cup Winners' Cup Top Scorer: 1972–73
- Mitropa Cup Top Scorer: 1971–72
- Fiorentina Hall of Fame
