= 1971–72 Coppa Italia =

Tournament details
- Country: Italy
- Dates: 29 Aug 1971 – 5 July 1972
- Teams: 36

Final positions
- Champions: Milan (2nd title)
- Runners-up: Napoli

Tournament statistics
- Matches played: 95
- Goals scored: 204 (2.15 per match)
- Top goal scorer(s): Roberto Boninsegna (8 goals)

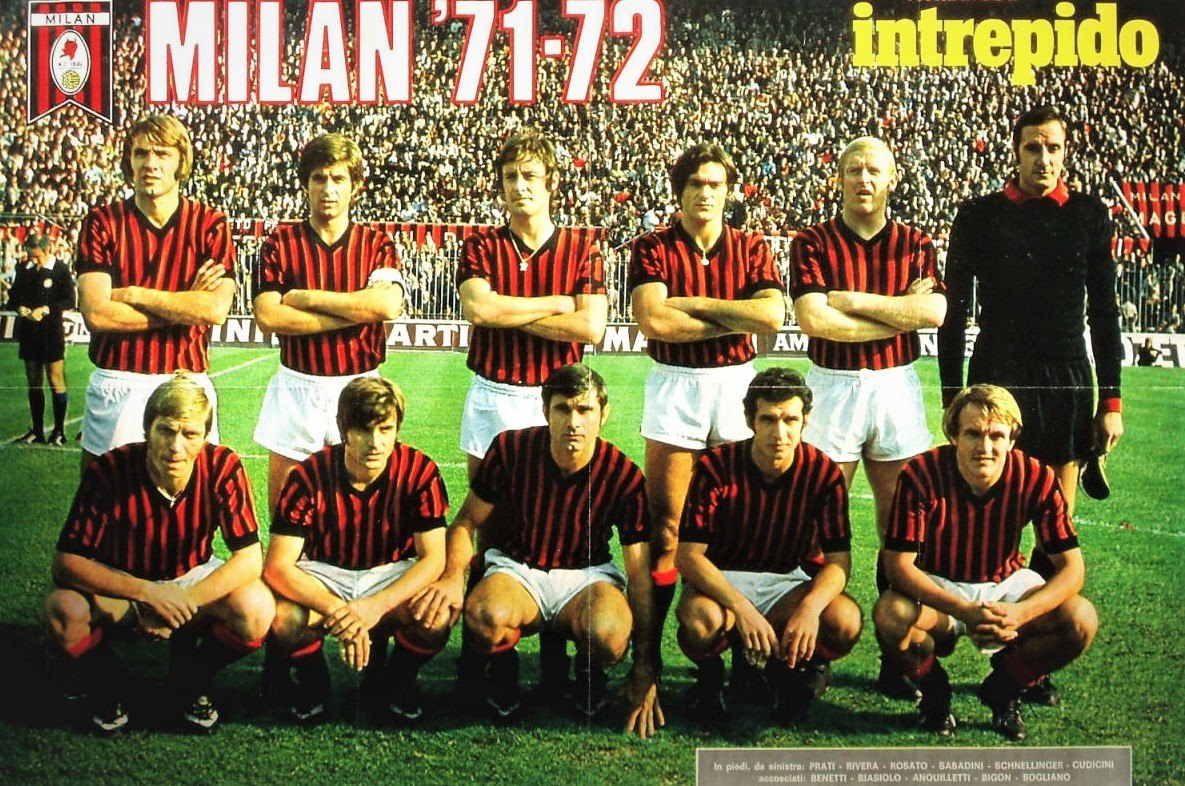
1971–72 Milan Associazione Calcio

The 1971–72 Coppa Italia was the 25th Coppa Italia, the major Italian domestic cup. The competition was won by Milan, who defeated Napoli in a one-legged final played at the Stadio Olimpico in Rome.

== First round ==
=== Group 1 ===
Pos	Team	Pld	W	D	L	GF	GA	GD	Pts
1	Internazionale	4	2	2	0	9	2	+7	6
2	Varese	4	2	2	0	4	1	+3	6
3	Como	4	2	1	1	4	2	+2	5
4	Brescia	4	1	1	2	4	4	0	3
5	Reggina	4	0	0	4	2	14	−12	0

=== Group 2 ===
Pos	Team	Pld	W	D	L	GF	GA	GD	Pts
1	Milan	4	3	1	0	6	1	+5	7
2	Mantova	4	2	0	2	5	5	0	4
3	Novara	4	2	0	2	4	5	−1	4
4	Catania	4	1	1	2	3	5	−2	3
5	Monza	4	1	0	3	3	5	−2	2

=== Group 3 ===
Pos	Team	Pld	W	D	L	GF	GA	GD	Pts
1	Napoli	4	3	0	1	4	2	+2	6
2	Catanzaro	4	2	1	1	3	2	+1	5
3	Hellas Verona	4	1	2	1	6	3	+3	4
4	Sorrento	4	2	0	2	3	6	−3	4
5	Palermo	4	0	1	3	1	4	−3	1

=== Group 4 ===
Pos	Team	Pld	W	D	L	GF	GA	GD	Pts
1	Juventus	4	2	2	0	10	5	+5	6
2	Sampdoria	4	2	1	1	4	4	0	5
3	Genoa	4	0	4	0	5	5	0	4
4	Bari	4	0	3	1	2	3	−1	3
5	Taranto	4	0	2	2	2	6	−4	2

=== Group 5 ===
Pos	Team	Pld	W	D	L	GF	GA	GD	Pts
1	Bologna	4	4	0	0	12	3	+9	8
2	Modena	4	2	0	2	4	5	−1	4
3	Vicenza	4	2	0	2	6	8	−2	4
4	Reggiana	4	1	1	2	4	5	−1	3
5	Cesena	4	0	1	3	0	5	−5	1

=== Group 6 ===
Pos	Team	Pld	W	D	L	GF	GA	GD	Pts
1	Lazio	4	3	1	0	6	1	+5	7
2	Roma	4	1	2	1	2	2	0	4
3	Atalanta	4	0	3	1	1	2	−1	3
4	Perugia	4	1	1	2	4	6	−2	3
5	Ternana	4	0	3	1	2	4	−2	3

=== Group 7 ===
Pos	Team	Pld	W	D	L	GF	GA	GD	Pts
1	Fiorentina	4	3	0	1	7	1	+6	6
2	Cagliari	4	2	2	0	7	3	+4	6
3	Arezzo	4	0	3	1	4	5	−1	3
4	Livorno	4	1	1	2	2	7	−5	3
5	Foggia	4	0	2	2	4	8	−4	2

== Final Group ==
Join the defending champion: Torino.

=== Group A ===
Pos	Team	Pld	W	D	L	GF	GA	GD	Pts	ACM	TOR	INT	JUV
1	Milan	6	4	2	0	7	3	+4	10	—	1–1	1–0	3–2
2	Torino	6	2	2	2	5	7	−2	6	0–0	—	1–0	2–1
3	Internazionale	6	2	0	4	7	6	+1	4	0–1	3–0	—	3–1
4	Juventus	6	2	0	4	8	11	−3	4	0–1	2–1	2–1	—

Source: historical-lineups.com

4 June 1972 Matchday 1	Internazionale	3–1	Juventus	Milan
Sunday	Boninsegna 16', 89'; Mazzola 72'		Anastasi 2'	Referee: Giunti

4 June 1972 Matchday 1	Torino	0–0	Milan	Turin
Sunday				Referee: Menegali

8 June 1972 Matchday 2	Juventus	2–1	Torino	Turin
Wednesday	Furino 19'; Anastasi 88'		Ferrini 66'	Referee: Torelli

7 June 1972 Matchday 2	Milan	1–0	Internazionale	Milan
Wednesday	Sabadini 43'			Referee: Gonella

11 June 1972 Matchday 3	Juventus	0–1	Milan	Turin
Sunday			Prati 27'	Referee: Toselli

11 June 1972 Matchday 3	Inter Milan	3–0	Torino	Milan
Sunday	Mazzola 40'; Corso 44'; Boninsegna 82'			Referee: R. Lattanzi

25 June 1972 Matchday 4	Juventus	2–1	Internazionale	Turin
Sunday	Novellini 47', 80'		Jair 88'	Referee: Barbaresco

25 June 1972 Matchday 4	Milan	1–1	Torino	Milan
Sunday	Benetti 68' (pen.)		Puia 25'	Referee: Pieroni

28 June 1972 Matchday 5	Internazionale	0–1	Milan	Milan
Wednesday			Bigon 28'	Referee: Bernadis

28 June 1972 Matchday 5	Torino	2–1	Juventus	Turin
Wednesday	Bui 82'; Toschi 88'		Capello 84'	Referee: Francescon

1 July 1972 Matchday 6	Milan	3–2	Juventus	Milan
Sunday	Rivera 13' (pen.), 73'; Piloni 18' (o.g.)		Novellini 34'; Haller 44'	Referee: Giunti

1 July 1972 Matchday 6	Torino	1–0	Internazionale	Turin
Sunday	Toschi 52' (pen.)			Referee: Monti

=== Group B ===
Pos	Team	Pld	W	D	L	GF	GA	GD	Pts	NAP	FIO	BOL	LAZ
1	Napoli	6	2	3	1	11	9	+2	7	—	1–1	2–1	5–1
2	Fiorentina	6	1	4	1	5	4	+1	6	1–1	—	0–0	1–1
3	Bologna	6	2	2	2	6	7	−1	6	2–2	0–2	—	2–1
4	Lazio	6	2	1	3	7	9	−2	5	3–0	1–0	0–1	—

Source: historical-lineups.com

4 June 1972 Matchday 1	Bologna	2–2	Napoli	Bologna
Sunday	Bulgarelli 68'; Gregori 77'		M. Perego 14'; Juliano 88'	Referee: Carminati

4 June 1972 Matchday 1	Lazio	1–0	Fiorentina	Rome
Sunday	Nanni 88'			Referee: Trinchieri

8 June 1972 Matchday 2	Fiorentina	0–0	Bologna	Florence
Wednesday				Referee: Trono

8 June 1972 Matchday 2	Napoli	5–1	Lazio	Naples
Wednesday	Sormani 39'; Juliano 43'; Montefusco 47', 85'; Macchi 73'		Facchin 30'	Referee: Reggiani

11 June 1972 Matchday 3	Fiorentina	1–1	Napoli	Florence
Sunday	Clerici 28' (pen.)		Macchi 90'	Referee: Francescon

14 June 1972 Matchday 3	Lazio	0–1	Bologna	Rome
Wednesday			Savoldi 87'	Referee: Porcelli

25 June 1972 Matchday 4	Fiorentina	1–1	Lazio	Florence
Sunday	Nanni 43' (pen.)		Clerici 64' (pen.)	Referee: Michelotti

25 June 1972 Matchday 4	Napoli	2–1	Bologna	Naples
Sunday	M. Perego 16'; Macchi 46'		Rizzo 20'	Referee: Serafini

28 June 1972 Matchday 5	Bologna	0–2	Fiorentina	Bologna
Wednesday			De Sisti 79'; Braglia 90'	Referee: Motta

28 June 1972 Matchday 5	Lazio	3–0	Napoli	Rome
Wednesday	Gritti 38'; D'Amico 60'; Chinaglia 67'			Referee: Branzoni

1 July 1972 Matchday 6	Bologna	2–1	Lazio	Bologna
Sunday	Ghetti 3', 63'		Chinaglia 15'	Referee: Gialluisi

1 July 1972 Matchday 6	Napoli	1–1	Fiorentina	Naples
Sunday	M. Perego 10'		Braglia 25'	Referee: Carminati

== Final ==
5 July 1972
21:00

Milan	2–0	Napoli
Panzanato 49' (o.g.); Rosato 78'

Stadio Olimpico, Rome
Referee: Paolo Toselli

== Top goalscorers ==
Rank	Player	Club	Goals
1	(Italy) Roberto Boninsegna	Internazionale	8
2	(Italy) Francesco Rizzo	Bologna	5
2	(Italy) Giorgio Chinaglia	Lazio	5
4	(Italy) Pietro Anastasi	Juventus	4
4	(Italy) Pierino Prati	Milan	4
