= Giulio Zignoli =

Italian footballer

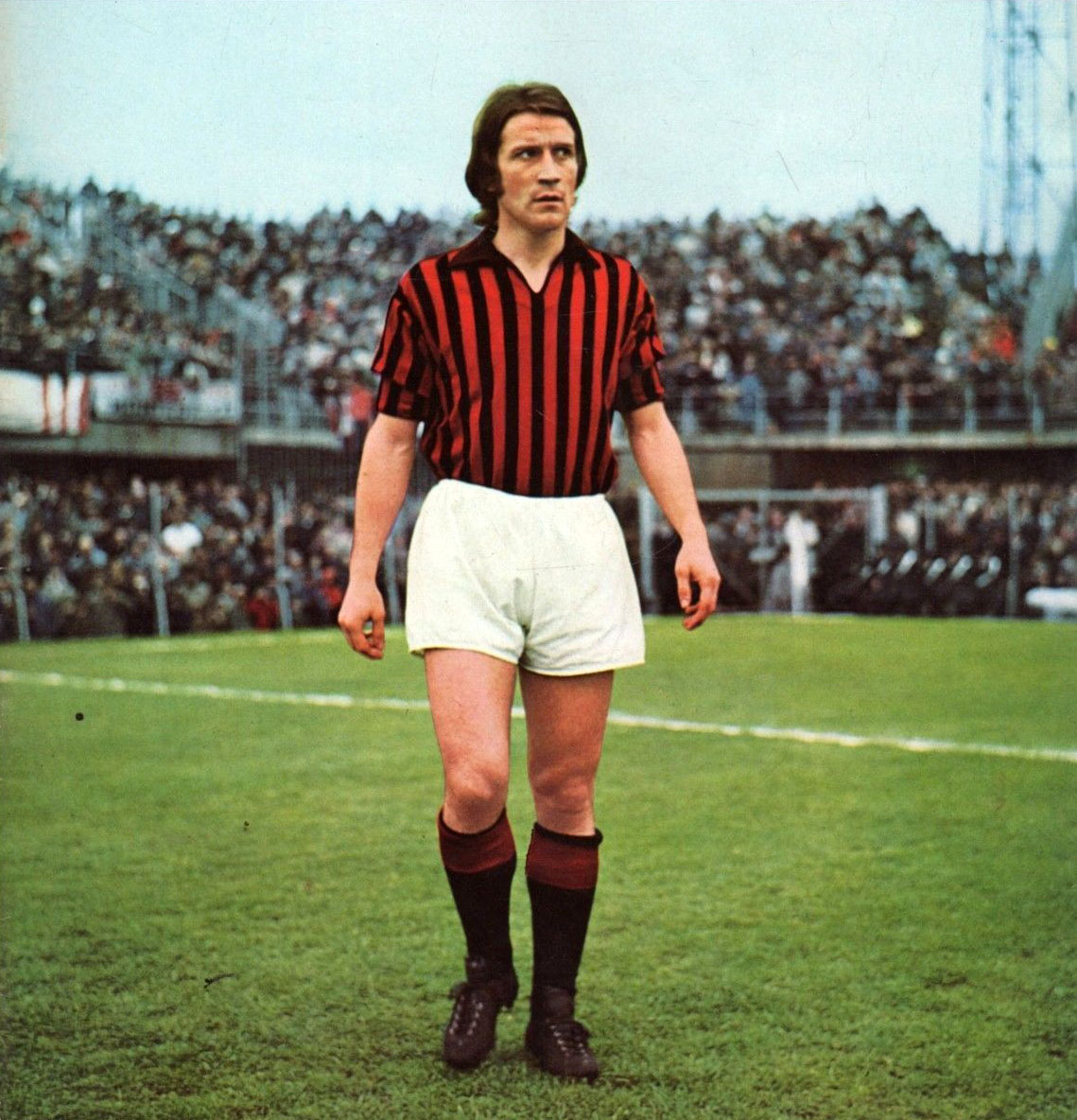
- Zignoli with Milan in 1971

Personal information
- Full name: Giulio Zignoli
- Date of birth: 19 April 1946
- Place of birth: Verona, Italy
- Date of death: 12 September 2010 (aged 64)
- Place of death: Cantù, Italy
- Height: 1.72 m (5 ft 7 1/2 in)
- Position: Left back

Youth career
- Milan

Senior career*
Years	Team	Apps	(Gls)
1966–1967	Taranto	34	(1)
1967–1968	Bari	38	(0)
1968–1970	Cagliari	26	(0)
1970–1974	Milan	56	(0)
1974–1975	Varese	24	(0)
1975–1976	Milan	2	(0)
1976–1977	Seregno	9	(0)
Total		190	(1)
- * Club domestic league appearances and goals

Giulio Zignoli (19 April 1946 – 12 September 2010) was an Italian professional footballer, who played as a defender. He made 108 appearances in Serie A, most notably for Cagliari and Milan, during the late 1960s and 1970s. He died in Cantù, aged 64.

== Honours ==
=== Club ===
- Cagliari
  - Serie A: 1969–70
- A.C. Milan
  - Coppa Italia: 1971–72, 1972–73
  - Cup Winners' Cup: 1972–73
