= 1972–73 Coppa Italia =

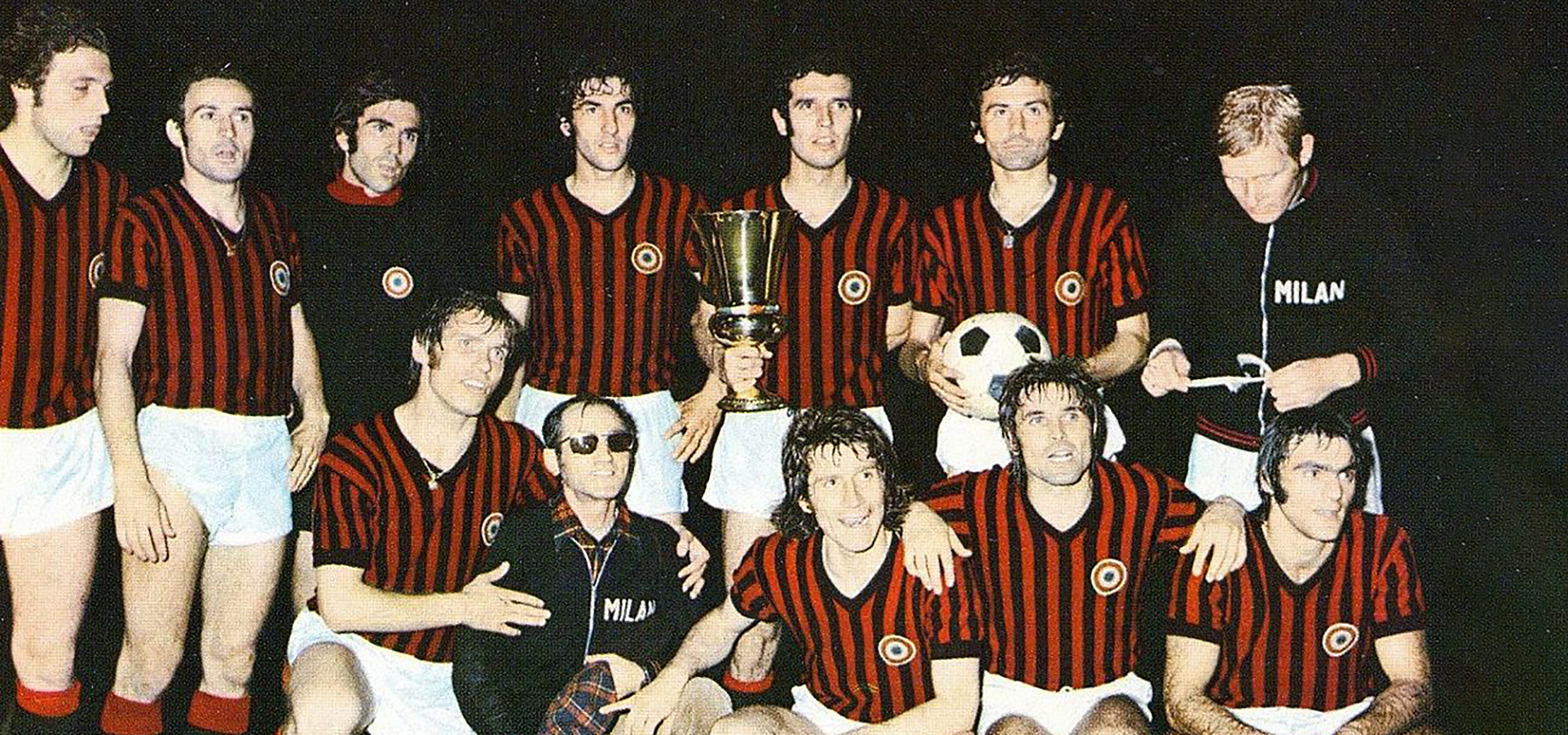
- Milan poses with the trophy

Tournament details
- Country: Italy
- Dates: 27 Aug 1972 – 1 July 1973
- Teams: 36

Final positions
- Champions: Milan (3rd title)
- Runners-up: Juventus

Tournament statistics
- Matches played: 95
- Goals scored: 199 (2.09 per match)
- Top goal scorer: Gigi Riva (8 goals)

The 1972–73 Coppa Italia was the 26th Coppa Italia, the major Italian domestic cup. The competition was won by Milan.

== First round ==
=== Group 1 ===
Pos	Team	Pld	W	D	L	GF	GA	GD	Pts
1	Juventus	4	2	2	0	5	1	+4	6
2	Varese	4	1	3	0	4	3	+1	5
3	Hellas Verona	4	0	4	0	1	1	0	4
4	Novara	4	1	1	2	3	3	0	3
5	Foggia	4	0	2	2	2	7	−5	2

=== Group 2 ===
Pos	Team	Pld	W	D	L	GF	GA	GD	Pts
1	Reggiana	4	3	0	1	8	5	+3	6
2	Brescia	4	2	1	1	6	6	0	5
3	Vicenza	4	1	2	1	6	5	+1	4
4	Torino	4	1	2	1	3	3	0	4
5	Catania	4	0	1	3	2	6	−4	1

=== Group 3 ===
Pos	Team	Pld	W	D	L	GF	GA	GD	Pts
1	Cagliari	4	4	0	0	10	1	+9	8
2	Arezzo	4	1	2	1	2	4	−2	4
3	Perugia	4	1	1	2	5	3	+2	3
4	Ascoli	4	0	3	1	2	4	−2	3
5	Ternana	4	0	2	2	2	9	−7	2

=== Group 4 ===
Pos	Team	Pld	W	D	L	GF	GA	GD	Pts
1	Internazionale	4	3	1	0	10	3	+7	7
2	Catanzaro	4	3	0	1	5	3	+2	6
3	Genoa	4	1	1	2	5	6	−1	3
4	Sampdoria	4	0	3	1	3	4	−1	3
5	Lecco	4	0	1	3	3	10	−7	1

=== Group 5 ===
Pos	Team	Pld	W	D	L	GF	GA	GD	Pts
1	Bologna	4	3	1	0	6	3	+3	7
2	Cesena	4	2	1	1	9	2	+7	5
3	Monza	4	2	0	2	7	11	−4	4
4	Fiorentina	4	0	3	1	3	6	−3	3
5	Bari	4	0	1	3	2	5	−3	1

=== Group 6 ===
Pos	Team	Pld	W	D	L	GF	GA	GD	Pts
1	Atalanta	4	3	1	0	7	0	+7	7
2	Roma	4	3	1	0	7	2	+5	7
3	Mantova	4	1	1	2	4	5	−1	3
4	Como	4	0	2	2	2	5	−3	2
5	Reggina	4	0	1	3	1	9	−8	1

=== Group 7 ===
Pos	Team	Pld	W	D	L	GF	GA	GD	Pts
1	Napoli	4	3	1	0	6	1	+5	7
2	Taranto	4	1	2	1	2	2	0	4
3	Palermo	4	0	4	0	1	1	0	4
4	Brindisi	4	1	2	1	1	3	−2	4
5	Lazio	4	0	1	3	1	4	−3	1

== Second round ==
Join the defending champion: Milan.

=== Group A ===
Pos	Team	Pld	W	D	L	GF	GA	GD	Pts
1	Juventus	6	3	3	0	12	8	+4	9
2	Internazionale	6	3	1	2	9	6	+3	7
3	Bologna	6	2	2	2	7	9	−2	6
4	Reggiana	6	0	2	4	4	9	−5	2

=== Group B ===
Pos	Team	Pld	W	D	L	GF	GA	GD	Pts
1	Milan	6	5	0	1	7	1	+6	10
2	Atalanta	6	3	1	2	7	6	+1	7
3	Napoli	6	1	2	3	3	7	−4	4
4	Cagliari	6	1	1	4	4	7	−3	3

== Final ==
1 July 1973
21:00

Milan	1–1 (a.e.t.)	Juventus
Benetti 50' (pen.)		R. Bettega 15'
Penalties
Schnellinger (penalty scored); Benetti (penalty scored); Chiarugi (penalty scored); Biasiolo (penalty scored); Magherini (penalty scored)	5–2	(penalty scored) Causio; (penalty missed) Anastasi; (penalty missed) R. Bettega; (penalty missed) Spinosi; (penalty scored) Cuccureddu

Stadio Olimpico, Rome
Referee: Alberto Michelotti

== Top goalscorers ==
Rank	Player	Club	Goals
1	(Italy) Gigi Riva	Cagliari	8
2	(Italy) Roberto Boninsegna	Internazionale	6
2	(Italy) Giuseppe Savoldi	Bologna	6
4	(Italy) Sergio Pellizzaro	Atalanta	5
4	(Italy) Pietro Anastasi	Juventus	5
4	(Italy) Giampietro Spagnolo	Reggiana	5
7	(Italy) Franco Causio	Juventus	4
7	(Italy) Egidio Salvi	Brescia	4
7	(Italy) Sandro Mazzola	Internazionale	4
7	(Italy) Walter Speggiorin	Vicenza	4
7	(Italy) Ariedo Braida	Cesena	4
