= 1972–73 European Cup Winners' Cup =

Final positions
- Champions: (Italy) Milan (2nd title)
- Runners-up: (England) Leeds United

The 1972–73 European Cup Winners' Cup football club tournament was won by Milan after a 1–0 victory against Leeds United at the Kaftanzoglio Stadium, Thessaloniki, Greece.

Competition holders Rangers would have been eligible to compete in the Cup Winners' Cup, but were banned from European competition in the 1972–73 season due to the violent disturbances at the 1972 European Cup Winners' Cup Final.

== First round ==
| Team 1 | Agg. | Team 2 | 1st leg | 2nd leg |
|---|---|---|---|---|
| Bastia (France) | 1–2 | (Spain) Atlético Madrid | 0–0 (Report) (Report 2) | 1–2 (Report) (Report 2) |
| Spartak Moscow (Soviet Union) | 1–0 | (Netherlands) FC Den Haag | 1–0 (Report) (Report 2) | 0–0 (Report) (Report 2) |
| Víkingur (Iceland) | 0–11 | (Poland) Legia Warszawa | 0–2 (Report) (Report 2) | 0–9 (Report) (Report 2) |
| Red Boys Differdange (Luxembourg) | 1–7 | (Italy) Milan | 1–4 (Report) (Report 2) | 0–3 (Report) (Report 2) |
| Pezoporikos Larnaca (Cyprus) | 2–6 | (Republic of Ireland) Cork Hibernians | 1–2 (Report) (Report 2) | 1–4 (Report) (Report 2) |
| Schalke 04 (West Germany) | 5–2 | (Bulgaria) Slavia Sofia | 2–1 (Report) (Report 2) | 3–1 (Report) (Report 2) |
| Floriana (Malta) | 1–6 | (Hungary) Ferencváros | 1–0 (Report) (Report 2) | 0–6 (Report) (Report 2) |
| Standard Liège (Belgium) | 3–4 | (Czechoslovakia) Sparta Prague | 1–0 (Report) (Report 2) | 2–4 (Report) (Report 2) |
| Carl Zeiss Jena (East Germany) | 8–4 | (Finland) MP | 6–1 (Report) (Report 2) | 2–3 (Report) (Report 2) |
| Ankaragücü (Turkey) | 1–2 | (England) Leeds United | 1–1 (Report) (Report 2) | 0–1 (Report) (Report 2) |
| Rapid Wien (Austria) | 2–2 (a) | (Greece) PAOK | 0–0 (Report) (Report 2) | 2–2 (Report) (Report 2) |
| Rapid București (Romania) | 3–1 | (Sweden) Landskrona BoIS | 3–0 (Report) (Report 2) | 0–1 (Report) (Report 2) |
| Sporting CP (Portugal) | 3–7 | (Scotland) Hibernian | 2–1 (Report) (Report 2) | 1–6 (Report) (Report 2) |
| Fremad Amager (Denmark) | 1–1 (a) | (Albania) Besa Kavajë | 1–1 (Report) (Report 2) | 0–0 (Report) (Report 2) |
| Zürich (Switzerland) | 2–3 | (Wales) Wrexham | 1–1 (Report) (Report 2) | 1–2 (Report) (Report 2) |
| Hajduk Split (Socialist Federal Republic of Yugoslavia) | 2–0 | (Norway) Fredrikstad | 1–0 (Report) (Report 2) | 1–0 (Report) (Report 2) |

=== First leg ===
6 September 1972

| Red Boys Differdange (Luxembourg) | 1–4 | (Italy) Milan |
|---|---|---|
| H. Klein 90' | | Prati 5', 10'; Turone 19'; Chiarugi 83' |

Stade du Thillenberg, Differdange
Attendance: 5,200
Referee: Robert Wurtz (France)

10 September 1972

| Pezoporikos Larnaca (Cyprus) | 1–2 | (Republic of Ireland) Cork Hibernians |
|---|---|---|
| Duffy 57' | | Lawson 25' (pen.); Sheehan 75' |

Flower Lodge, Cork
Attendance: 5,653
Referee: Guðmundur Haraldsson (Iceland)

Match played in Cork due to the dangerous political situation in Cyprus at the time.

13 September 1972

| Ankaragücü (Turkey) | 1–1 | (England) Leeds United |
|---|---|---|
| Yalman 50' (pen.) | | Jordan 44' |

Ankara 19 Mayis Stadium, Ankara
Attendance: 20,000
Referee: Kevork Ghemigean (Romania)

13 September 1972

| Rapid București (Romania) | 3–0 | (Sweden) Landskrona BoIS |
|---|---|---|
| Marin 43', 70'; Năsturescu 82' | Report |

Stadionul 23 August, Bucharest
Attendance: 4,986
Referee: Franz Wöhrer (Austria)

13 September 1972

| Hajduk Split (Socialist Federal Republic of Yugoslavia) | 1–0 | (Norway) Fredrikstad |
|---|---|---|
| Nadoveza 19' |

Kod Stare Plinare Stadium, Split
Attendance: 15,000
Referee: Faik Bajrami (Albania)

13 September 1972

| Sporting CP (Portugal) | 2–1 | (Scotland) Hibernian |
|---|---|---|
| Fraguito 59'; Manaca 61' | | Duncan 69' |

Estádio José Alvalade, Lisbon
Attendance: 30,000
Referee: Arie Van Gemert (Netherlands)

13 September 1972
20:15

| Zürich (Switzerland) | 1–1 | (Wales) Wrexham |
|---|---|---|
| Künzli 47' | FCZ summary | Kinsey 48' |

Letzigrund, Zürich
Attendance: 6,500
Referee: Petar Kostovski (Yugoslavia)

=== Second leg ===
27 September 1972

| Milan (Italy) | 3–0 | (Luxembourg) Red Boys Differdange |
|---|---|---|
| Chiarugi 4', 66'; Benetti 33' |

San Siro, Milan
Attendance: 30,000
Referee: Richard Casha (Malta)

AC Milan won 7–1 on aggregate.

13 September 1972

| Cork Hibernians (Republic of Ireland) | 4-1 | (Cyprus) Pezoporikos Larnaca |
|---|---|---|
| Wallace 21'; Lawson 45', 72'; Dennehy 85' | | Miller 70' |

Flower Lodge, Cork
Attendance: 5,000
Referee: Einar Hjartarson (Iceland)

Cork Hibernians won 6–2 on aggregate.

27 September 1972

| Leeds United (England) | 1–0 | (Turkey) Ankaragücü |
|---|---|---|
| Jones 68' |

Elland Road, Leeds
Attendance: 22,411
Referee: Klaus Ohmsen (West Germany)

Leeds United won 2–1 on aggregate.

27 September 1972

| Landskrona BoIS (Sweden) | 1–0 | (Romania) Rapid București |
|---|---|---|
| Lindgren 32' | Report |

Landskrona IP, Landskrona
Attendance: 10,000
Referee: John Wright Paterson (Scotland)

Rapid București won 3–1 on aggregate.

27 September 1972

| Fredrikstad (Norway) | 0–1 | (Socialist Federal Republic of Yugoslavia) Hajduk Split |
|---|---|---|
| | | Nadoveza 25' |

Fredrikstad Stadion, Fredrikstad
Attendance: 7,781
Referee: Kai Rasmussen (Denmark)

Hajduk Split won 2–0 on aggregate.

27 September 1972

| Hibernian (Scotland) | 6–1 | (Portugal) Sporting CP |
|---|---|---|
| Gordon 28', 59'; O'Rourke 55', 63', 80' (pen.); Manaca 87' (o.g.) | | Yazalde 42' |

Easter Road
Attendance: 26,041
Referee: Günter Männig (East Germany)

Hibernian won 7–3 on aggregate.

27 September 1972

| Wrexham (Wales) | 2–1 | (Switzerland) Zürich |
|---|---|---|
| Ashcroft 63'; Sutton 74' | FCZ summary | Martinelli 48' |

Racecourse Ground, Wrexham
Attendance: 18,000
Referee: Rolf Nyhus (Norway)

Wrexham won 3–2 on aggregate

== Second round ==
| Team 1 | Agg. | Team 2 | 1st leg | 2nd leg |
|---|---|---|---|---|
| Atlético Madrid (Spain) | 5–5 (a) | (Soviet Union) Spartak Moscow | 3–4 (Report) (Report 2) | 2–1 (Report) (Report 2) |
| Legia Warsaw (Poland) | 2–3 | (Italy) Milan | 1–1 (Report) (Report 2) | 1–2(aet) (Report) (Report 2) |
| Cork Hibernians (Republic of Ireland) | 0–3 | (West Germany) Schalke 04 | 0–0 (Report) (Report 2) | 0–3 (Report) (Report 2) |
| Ferencváros (Hungary) | 3–4 | (Czechoslovakia) Sparta Prague | 2–0 (Report) (Report 2) | 1–4 (Report) (Report 2) |
| Carl Zeiss Jena (East Germany) | 0–2 | (England) Leeds United | 0–0 (Report) (Report 2) | 0–2 (Report) (Report 2) |
| Rapid Wien (Austria) | 2–4 | (Romania) Rapid București | 1–1 (Report) (Report 2) | 1–3 (Report) (Report 2) |
| Hibernian (Scotland) | 8–2 | (Albania) Besa Kavajë | 7–1 (Report) (Report 2) | 1–1 (Report) (Report 2) |
| Wrexham (Wales) | 3–3 (a) | (Socialist Federal Republic of Yugoslavia) Hajduk Split | 3–1 (Report) (Report 2) | 0–2 (Report) (Report 2) |

=== First leg ===
25 October 1972

| Carl Zeiss Jena (East Germany) | 0–0 | (England) Leeds United |

Ernst-Abbe-Sportfeld, Jena
Attendance: 18,000
Referee: Leo Van der Kroft (Netherlands)

25 October 1972

| Legia Warsaw (Poland) | 1–1 | (Italy) Milan |
|---|---|---|
| Deyna 79' | | Golin 75' |

Polish Army Stadium, Warsaw
Attendance: 52,500
Referee: Christos Michas (Greece)

25 October 1972

| Rapid Wien (Austria) | 1–1 | (Romania) Rapid București |
|---|---|---|
| Gallos 10' | Report | Neagu 66' |

Praterstadion, Vienna
Attendance: 12,000
Referee: Vital Loraux (Belgium)

25 October 1972

| Wrexham (Wales) | 3–1 | (Socialist Federal Republic of Yugoslavia) Hajduk Split |
|---|---|---|
| Tinnion 14'; Smallman 15'; Mužinić 40' (o.g.) | | Jovanić 84' |

Racecourse Ground, Wrexham
Attendance: 19,013
Referee: Paul Bonett (Malta)

=== Second leg ===
8 November 1972

| Milan (Italy) | 2–1 (a.e.t) | (Poland) Legia Warsaw |
|---|---|---|
| Zignoli 10'; Chiarugi 118' | | Pieszko 44' |

San Siro, Milan
Attendance: 8,770
Referee: Kurt Tschenscher (West Germany)

AC Milan won 3–2 on aggregate.

8 November 1972

| Leeds United (England) | 2–0 | (East Germany) Carl Zeiss Jena |
|---|---|---|
| Cherry 55'; Jones 64' |

Elland Road, Leeds
Attendance: 26,885
Referee: Concetto Lo Bello (Italy)

Leeds United won 2–0 on aggregate.

8 November 1972

| Rapid București (Romania) | 3–1 | (Austria) Rapid Wien |
|---|---|---|
| Krankl 40' (o.g.); Boc 75'; Petreanu 85' | Report | Hof 50' |

Stadionul 23 August, Bucharest
Attendance: 15,000
Referee: Doğan Babacan (Turkey)

Rapid București won 4–2 on aggregate.

8 November 1972

| Hajduk Split (Socialist Federal Republic of Yugoslavia) | 2–0 | (Wales) Wrexham |
|---|---|---|
| Nadoveza 13', 28' (pen.) |

Kod Stare Plinare Stadium, Split
Attendance: 22,000
Referee: Janusz Eksztajn (Poland)

Hajduk Split 3–3 Wrexham on aggregate. Hajduk Split won on an away goals rule.

== Quarter-finals ==
| Team 1 | Agg. | Team 2 | 1st leg | 2nd leg |
|---|---|---|---|---|
| Spartak Moscow (Soviet Union) | 1–2 | (Italy) Milan | 0–1 (Report) (Report 2) | 1–1 (Report) (Report 2) |
| Schalke 04 (West Germany) | 2–4 | (Czechoslovakia) Sparta Prague | 2–1 (Report) (Report 2) | 0–3 (Report) (Report 2) |
| Leeds United (England) | 8–1 | (Romania) Rapid București | 5–0 (Report) (Report 2) | 3–1 (Report) (Report 2) |
| Hibernian (Scotland) | 4–5 | (Socialist Federal Republic of Yugoslavia) Hajduk Split | 4–2 (Report) (Report 2) | 0–3 (Report) (Report 2) |

=== First leg ===
7 March 1973

| Leeds United (England) | 5–0 | (Romania) Rapid București |
|---|---|---|
| Giles 15'; Clarke 25'; Lorimer 33', 50'; Jordan 65' |

Elland Road, Leeds
Attendance: 25,702
Referee: Bohumil Smejkal (Czechoslovakia)

7 March 1973

| Schalke 04 (West Germany) | 2–1 | (Czechoslovakia) Sparta Prague |
|---|---|---|
| Ehmke 41'; Rüssmann 44' | Report | Barton 21' |

Glückauf-Kampfbahn, Gelsenkirchen
Attendance: 12,000
Referee: Nicolae Rainea (Romania)

7 March 1973

| Spartak Moscow (Soviet Union) | 0–1 | (Italy) Milan |
|---|---|---|
| | | Benetti 62' |

Sochi Central Stadium, Sochi
Attendance: 14,374
Referee: Jack Taylor (England)

7 March 1973

| Hibernian (Scotland) | 4–2 | (Socialist Federal Republic of Yugoslavia) Hajduk Split |
|---|---|---|
| Gordon 7', 26', 60'; Duncan 47' | | Hlevnjak 38', 77' |

Easter Road, Edinburgh
Attendance: 28,424
Referee: Antonio Camacho Jiménez (Spain)

=== Second leg ===
21 March 1973

| Milan (Italy) | 1–1 | (Soviet Union) Spartak Moscow |
|---|---|---|
| Bigon 2' | | Piskaryov 7' |

San Siro, Milan
Attendance: 25,829
Referee: Milivoje Gugulović (Yugoslavia)

AC Milan won 2–1 on aggregate.

21 March 1973

| Rapid București (Romania) | 1–3 | (England) Leeds United |
|---|---|---|
| Dumitriu 62' | | Bates 1'; Jones 23'; Jordan 75' |

Stadionul Republicii, Bucharest
Attendance: 25,000
Referee: Ove Dahlberg (Sweden)

Leeds United won 8–1 on aggregate.

21 March 1973

| Sparta Prague (Czechoslovakia) | 3–0 | (West Germany) Schalke 04 |
|---|---|---|
| Jurkanin 1'; Kara 63'; Barton 82' | Report |

Stadion Letná, Prague
Attendance: 34,600
Referee: Clive Thomas (Wales)

Slavia Prague won 4–2 on aggregate.

21 March 1973

| Hajduk Split (Socialist Federal Republic of Yugoslavia) | 3–0 | (Scotland) Hibernian |
|---|---|---|
| Bošković 16'; Hlevnjak 23'; Blackley 53' (o.g.) |

Kod Stare Plinare Stadium, Split
Attendance: 25,000
Referee: Christos Michas (Greece)

Hajduk Split won 5–4 on aggregate.

== Semi-finals ==
| Team 1 | Agg. | Team 2 | 1st leg | 2nd leg |
|---|---|---|---|---|
| Milan (Italy) | 2–0 | (Czechoslovakia) Sparta Prague | 1–0 | 1–0 |
| Leeds United (England) | 1–0 | (Socialist Federal Republic of Yugoslavia) Hajduk Split | 1–0 | 0–0 |

=== First leg ===
11 April 1973

| Milan (Italy) | 1–0 | (Czechoslovakia) Sparta Prague |
|---|---|---|
| Chiarugi 68' | Report Report 2 |

San Siro, Milan
Attendance: 35,433
Referee: John Wright Paterson (Scotland)

11 April 1973

| Leeds United (England) | 1–0 | (Socialist Federal Republic of Yugoslavia) Hajduk Split |
|---|---|---|
| Clarke 21' | Report Report 2 |

Elland Road, Leeds
Attendance: 32,051
Referee: Gyula Emsberger (Hungary)

=== Second leg ===
25 April 1973

| Hajduk Split (Socialist Federal Republic of Yugoslavia) | 0–0 | (England) Leeds United |
|---|---|---|
| | Report Report 2 |

Kod Stare Plinare Stadium, Split
Attendance: 30,000
Referee: Robert Helies (France)

Leeds United won 1–0 on aggregate.

25 April 1973

| Sparta Prague (Czechoslovakia) | 0–1 | (Italy) Milan |
|---|---|---|
| | Report Report 2 | Chiarugi 74' |

Letná Stadium, Prague
Attendance: 37,000
Referee: Pablo Augusto Sánchez Ibáñez (Spain)

Milan won 2–0 on aggregate.

== Final ==
16 May 1973
19:15

| Leeds United (England) | 0–1 | (Italy) Milan |
|---|---|---|
| | Report Report 2 | Chiarugi 5' |

Kaftanzoglio Stadium, Thessaloniki
Attendance: 40,154
Referee: Christos Michas (Greece)

== See also ==
- 1972–73 European Cup
- 1972–73 UEFA Cup
