= 1973–74 Juventus FC season =

Italian football club season

Juventus FC
1973-74 season
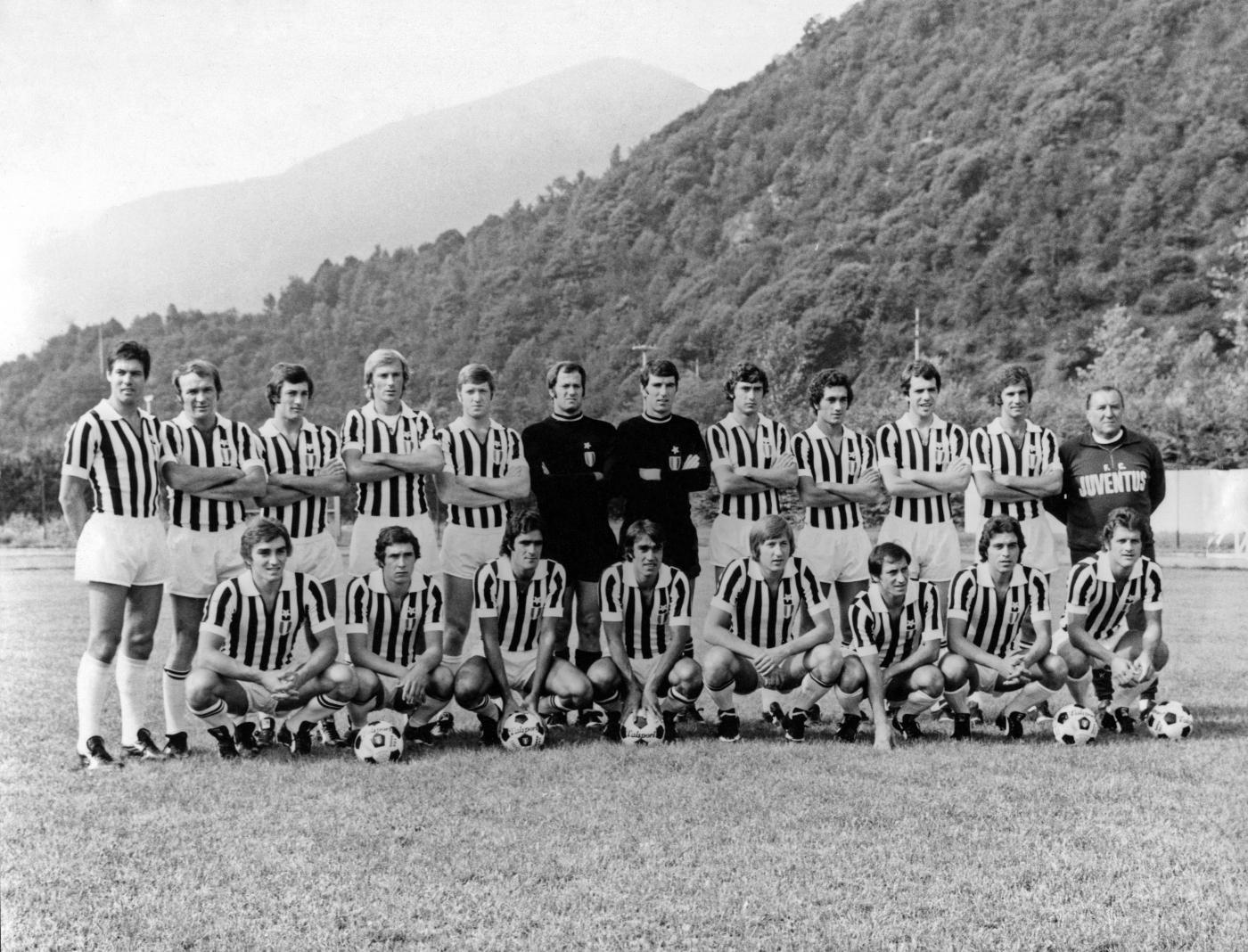
- President: Giampiero Boniperti
- Manager: Čestmír Vycpálek
- Stadium: Comunale
- Serie A: 2nd (in 1974-75 UEFA Cup)
- Coppa Italia: Second round
- European Cup: First round
- Intercontinental Cup: Runners-up
- Top goalscorer: Anastasi (16)
- Average home league attendance: 43,916
Home colours	Away colours

During the 1973–74 season Juventus competed in Serie A, Coppa Italia, Intercontinental Cup and European Cup.

== Summary ==
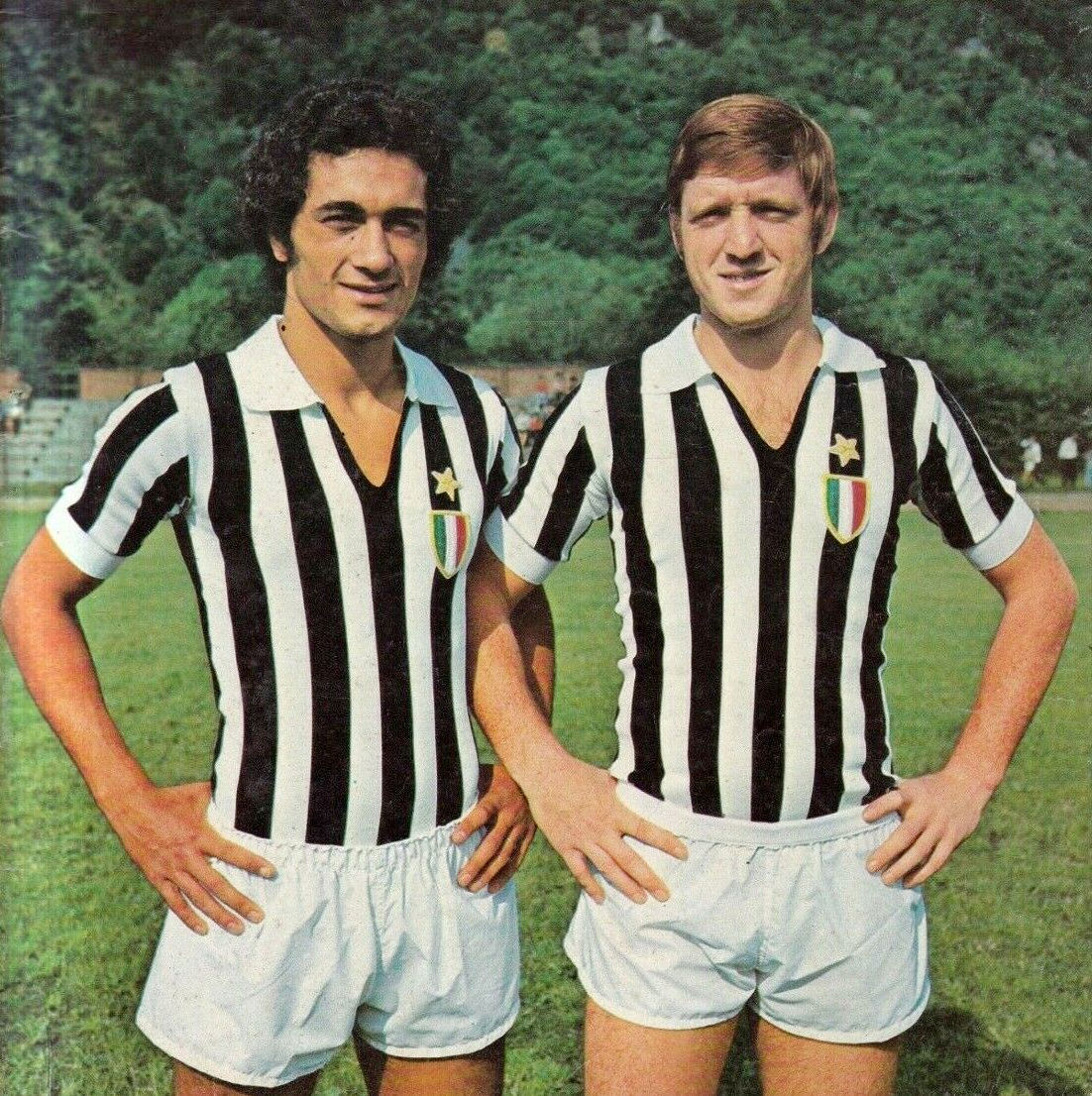
From left, newly arrived to the club Defender Claudio Gentile and Forward Giuliano Musiello.

During summer Giampiero Boniperti in his third season as Chairman transferred in Claudio Gentile future club legend and FIFA World Champion. Incumbent Champions in League, the team finishes the season with 41 points, only two points behind winners Lazio, first classified with 43.

Also in his third season as manager Čestmír Vycpálek saw the transfer out of Helmut Haller after five seasons as a starter in midfield, with the squad being eliminated early in European Cup by East German side Dynamo Dresden and losing the Intercontinental Cup against Independiente.

Meanwhile, in Coppa Italia the squad advanced to the second round losing the spot to the Final against Palermo FC in the last matches for Čestmír Vycpálek who left the club after three campaigns.

== Squad ==
Note: Flags indicate national team as defined under FIFA eligibility rules; some limited exceptions apply. Players may hold more than one non-FIFA nationality.

Pos.	Nation	Player
GK	ITA	Dino Zoff
GK	ITA	Massimo Piloni
DF	ITA	Luciano Spinosi
DF	ITA	Francesco Morini
DF	ITA	Sandro Salvadore
DF	ITA	Silvio Longobucco
DF	ITA	Claudio Gentile
DF	ITA	Giorgio Mastropasqua
DF	ITA	Alessandro Zagano
MF	ITA	Franco Causio
MF	ITA	Fabio Capello

Pos.	Nation	Player
MF	ITA	Antonello Cuccureddu
MF	ITA	Giuseppe Furino
MF	ITA	Fernando Viola
MF	ITA	Gianpietro Marchetti
MF	ITA	Domenico Maggiora
FW	ITA	Pietro Anastasi
FW	BRA	José Altafini
FW	ITA	Roberto Bettega
FW	ITA	Giuliano Musiello
FW	ITA	Pieraldo Nemo
FW	ITA	Paolo Rossi

=== Transfers ===
In
Pos.	Name	from	Type
DF	Claudio Gentile	Varese	
FW	Giuliano Musiello	Atalanta B.C.	
DF	Giorgio Mastropasqua	Ternana Calcio	
MF	Fernando Viola	AC Mantova	
MF	Domenico Maggiora		

Out
Pos.	Name	To	Type
FW	Helmut Haller	FC Augsburg	
MF	Gianluigi Savoldi	AC Cesena	
DF	Giuseppe Zaniboni	AC Cesena	
DF	Vincenzo Chiarenza	Sampdoria	

== Competitions ==
=== Serie A ===
==== League table ====
Pos	Team	Pld	W	D	L	GF	GA	GD	Pts	Qualification or relegation
1	Lazio (C)	30	18	7	5	45	23	+22	43	Disqualified from the European Cup
2	Juventus	30	16	9	5	50	26	+24	41	Qualification to UEFA Cup
3	Napoli	30	12	12	6	35	28	+7	36	Qualification to UEFA Cup
4	Internazionale	30	12	11	7	47	33	+14	35	Qualification to UEFA Cup
5	Torino	30	10	14	6	27	24	+3	34	Qualification to UEFA Cup

Source: Panini
(C) Champions

==== Results by round ====
Round	1	2	3	4	5	6	7	8	9	10	11	12	13	14	15	16	17	18	19	20	21	22	23	24	25	26	27	28	29	30
Ground	H	A	H	A	H	A	H	A	H	A	A	H	H	A	H	A	H	A	H	A	H	A	H	A	H	H	A	A	H	A
Result	W	L	W	D	W	D	W	W	D	L	W	W	W	L	D	D	W	L	D	W	W	D	D	W	D	W	W	L	W	W
Position	1	6	1	2	1	2	2	2	1	2	2	2	1	2	2	3	2	3	3	3	2	2	2	2	2	2	2	2	2	2

Source: Competitive matches
A = Away; H = Home; W = Win; D = Draw; L = Loss; P = Postponed; = Leader, 1974–75 European Cup; = 1974–75 UEFA Cup; = 1974-75 Serie B

==== Matches ====
7 October 1973 1	Juventus	2–1	Foggia Calcio	Turin
15:00 CET	Cuccureddu 44' (rig); Bettega 76'	Report	13' Pavone	Stadium: Comunale; Referee: Ezio Motta

14 October 1973 2	S.S.C. Napoli	2–0	Juventus	Naples
15:00 CET	Cané 45'; Clerici 78' (pen.)	Report		Stadium: San Paolo; Referee: Mario Bernardis

28 October 1973 3	Juventus	3–1	S.S. Lazio	Turin
15:00 CET	Altafini 50'; Bettega 62'; Cuccureddu 86'	Report	45' Chinaglia	Stadium: Comunale; Referee: Concetto Lo Bello

4 November 1973 4	Bologna FC	0–0	Juventus	Bologna
15:00 CET		Report		Stadium: Comunale; Referee: Domenico Serafino

18 November 1973 5	Juventus	3–0	Genoa CFC	Turin
15:00 CET	Cuccureddu 10', 30' (pen.); Capello 86'	Report		Stadium: Comunale; Referee: Renzo Torelli

25 November 1973 6	AC Milan	2–2	Juventus	Milan
15:00 CET	Rivera 21' (pen.), 87' (pen.)	Report	43', 77' Anastasi	Stadium: San Siro; Referee: Riccardo Lattanzi

2 December 1973 7	Juventus	5–1	Hellas Verona	Turin
14:30 CET	Cuccureddu 25', 26'; Causio 53'; Bet 56' (o.g.); Bettega 65'	Report	46' Zaccarelli	Stadium: Comunale; Referee: Ferdinando Reggiani

9 December 1973 8	Torino	0–1	Juventus	Turin
14:30 CET		Report	74' Cuccureddu	Stadium: Comunale; Referee: Francesco Panzino

16 December 1973 9	Juventus	2–2	Cesena	Turin
14:30 CET	Bettega 29'; Anastasi 73'	Report	13' Brignani; 49' Festa	Stadium: Comunale; Referee: Pierluigi Levrero

23 December 1973 10	Cagliari Calcio	2–1	Juventus	Cagliari
14:30 CET	Gori 45'; Riva 85'	Report	50' Altafini	Stadium: Sant'Elia; Referee: Aurelio Angonese

30 December 1973 11	Sampdoria	1–2	Juventus	Genoa
14:30 CET	Chiarenza 8'	Report	25', 63' Altafini	Stadium: Luigi Ferraris; Referee: Paolo Toselli

6 January 1974 12	Juventus	2–0	Inter	Turin
14:30 CET	Altafini 72'; Cuccureddu 78' (pen.)	Report		Stadium: Comunale; Referee: Domenico Serafino

13 January 1974 13	Juventus	2–1	AS Roma	Turin
14:30 CET	Capello 42'; Cuccureddu 73'	Report	66' Orazi	Stadium: Comunale; Referee: Gino Menicucci

20 January 1974 14	Fiorentina	2–0	Juventus	Florence
14:30 CET	Merlo 11' (pen.); Caso 84'	Report		Stadium: Comunale; Referee: Alberto Michelotti

27 January 1974 15	Juventus	0–0	Vicenza Calcio	Turin
14:30 CET		Report		Stadium: Comunale; Referee: Pasquale Gialluisi

3 February 1974 16	Foggia Calcio	0–0	Juventus	Foggia
14:30 CET		Report		Stadium: Pino Zaccheria; Referee: Lo Bello

10 February 1974 17	Juventus	4–1	S.S.C. Napoli	Turin
15:00 CET	Capello 7', 51'; Anastasi 20', 48'	Report	76' (pen.) Clerici	Stadium: Comunale; Referee: Giulio Ciacci

17 February 1974 18	S.S. Lazio	3–1	Juventus	Rome
15:00 CET	Garlaschelli 5'; Chinaglia 27', 66' (pen.)	Report	55' (pen.) Anastasi	Stadium: Olimpico; Referee: Francesco Panzino

3 March 1974 19	Juventus	1–1	Bologna FC	Turin
15:00 CET	Cuccureddu 58' (pen.)	Report	81' (pen.) Savoldi	Stadium: Comunale; Referee: Paolo Casarin

10 March 1974 20	Genoa C.F.C	0–1	Juventus	Genoa
15:00 CET		Report	12' Cuccureddu	Stadium: Luigi Ferraris; Referee: Pasquale Gialluisi

17 March 1974 21	Juventus	2–0	AC Milan	Turin
15:00 CET	Anastasi 46'; Altafini 79'	Report		Stadium: Comunale; Referee: Gianfranco Menegali

24 March 1974 22	Hellas Verona	0–0	Juventus	Verona
15:00 CET		Report		Stadium: Marcantonio Bentegodi; Referee: Domenico Serafino

31 March 1974 23	Juventus	1–1	Torino	Turin
15:00 CET	Cuccureddu 17' (rig)	Report	38' Graziani	Stadium: Comunale; Referee: Motta

7 April 1974 24	Cesena	0–2	Juventus	Cesena
15:30 CET		Report	6' Anastasi; 69' Altafini	Stadium: La Fiorita; Referee: Lo Bello

14 April 1974 25	Juventus	1–1	Cagliari Calcio	Turin
15:40 CET	Causio 84'	Report	53' Riva	Stadium: Comunale; Referee: Enzo Barbaresco

21 April 1974 26	Juventus	2–0	Sampdoria	Turin
15:30 CET	Bettega 5', 58'	Report		Stadium: Comunale; Referee: Renzo Torelli

28 April 1974 27	Inter	0–2	Juventus	Milan
15:30 CET		Report	32', 54' Bettega	Stadium: San Siro; Referee: Alberto Michelotti

5 May 1974 28	AS Roma	3–2	Juventus	Rome
16:00 CET	Domenghini 12'; Negrisolo 42'; Prati 74'	Report	16', 52' Anastasi	Stadium: Olimpico; Referee: Gino Menicucci

12 May 1974 29	Juventus	3–1	Fiorentina	Turin
16:00 CET	Anastasi 9', 78', 86'	Report	83' De Sisti	Stadium: Comunale; Referee: Concetto Lo Bello

19 May 1974 30	Vicenza	0–3	Juventus	Vicenza
16:00 CET		Report	1', 8', 38' Anastasi	Stadium: Stadio Romeo Menti; Referee: Prati

=== Coppa Italia ===
==== First round- Group 1 ====
Pos	Team	Pld	W	D	L	GF	GA	GD	Pts	Qualification
1	Juventus	4	4	0	0	13	1	+12	8	Qualified to Second round
2	SPAL	4	3	0	1	7	8	−1	6	
3	Ascoli	4	2	0	2	4	5	−1	4	
4	Foggia	4	0	1	3	0	3	−3	1	
5	Arezzo	4	0	1	3	2	9	−7	1	

===== Matches =====
29 August 1973 1	Juventus	3–1	Ascoli Calcio	Turin
21:00 CEST	Anastasi 21', 62'; Altafini 68'	Report	88' Carnevali	Stadium: Comunale; Referee: Pasquale Gialluisi

2 September 1973 2	S.P.A.L.	0–5	Juventus	Ferrara
21:00 CEST		Report	17', 77' (pen.) Cuccureddu; 59', 80', 88' Anastasi	Stadium: Comunale; Referee: Gussoni

23 September 1973 5	Juventus	4–0	Arezzo	Turin
21:00 CEST	Furino 27'; Anastasi 30'; Altafini 52'; Cuccureddu 68'	Report		Stadium: Comunale; Referee: Cesare Trinchieri

7 November 1973 3	Foggia Calcio	0–1	Juventus	Foggia
14:30 CET		Report	42' (aut) Liguori	Stadium: Pino Zaccheria; Referee: Carlo Cantelli

==== Second round - Group B ====
Pos	Team	Pld	W	D	L	GF	GA	GD	Pts	Qualification
1	Palermo	6	3	2	1	8	3	+5	8	Qualified to Final
2	Juventus	6	2	3	1	6	4	+2	7	
3	Cesena	6	1	3	2	5	7	−2	5	
4	Lazio	6	1	2	3	3	8	−5	4	

===== Matches =====
12 December 1973 1	Palermo FC	2–0	Juventus	Palermo
14:30 CET	Ballabio 21'; Barbana 87'	Report		Stadium: La Favorita; Referee: Cesare Gussoni

23 January 1974 2	S.S. Lazio	0–0	Juventus	Rome
14:30 CET		Report		Stadium: Olimpico; Referee: Mario Bernardis

6 February 1974 3	Juventus	1–1	Cesena	Turin
14:30 CET	Spinosi 36'	Report	45' Toschi	Stadium: Comunale; Referee: Vittorio Lattanzi

20 February 1974 4	Juventus	1–1	Palermo FC	Turin
15:00 CET	Anastasi 5'	Report	55' Buttini	Stadium: Comunale; Referee: Arnaldo Prati

27 March 1974 5	Juventus	3–0	S.S. Lazio	Turin
15:00 CET	Bettega 1', 55'; Causio 75'	Report		Stadium: Comunale; Referee: Fernando Lazzaroni

1 May 1974 6	Cesena	0–1	Juventus	Cesena
16:30 CET		Report	84' Musiello	Stadium: La Fiorita; Referee: Giulio Ciacci

=== European Cup ===
==== First round ====
19 September 1973 1	Dynamo Dresden (East Germany)	2–0	(Italy) Juventus	Dresden
21:00 CEST	Kreische 29'; Schade 42'	Report		Stadium: DDV-Stadion; Attendance: 29,196; Referee: (Switzerland) Bucheli

3 October 1973	Juventus (Italy)	3–2 (3–4 agg.)	(East Germany) Dynamo Dresden	Turin
21:00 CET	Furino 9'; Altafini 25'; Cuccureddu 31'	Report	24' Rau; 75' Sachse	Stadium: Comunale; Attendance: 64,763; Referee: (Belgium) Loraux

=== Intercontinental Cup ===
28 November 1973	Juventus (Italy)	0–1	(Argentina) Independiente	Rome
15:30 CET		Report	79' Bochini	Stadium: Olimpico; Attendance: 22,489; Referee: (Belgium) Alfred Delcourt
Note: Juventus played the 1973 Intercontinental Cup against Independiente replacing European Cup Champions Ajax which refused to play in Argentina. The venue was Stadio Olimpico in Rome.

== Statistics ==
=== Players statistics ===
No.	Pos	Nat	Player	Total		1973-74 Serie A	
No.	Pos	Nat	Player	Apps	Goals	Apps	Goals
	GK	(Italy) ITA	Dino Zoff	30	-26	30	-26
	DF	(Italy) ITA	Silvio Longobucco	24	0	21+3	0
	DF	(Italy) ITA	Sandro Salvadore	27	0	27	0
	DF	(Italy) ITA	Francesco Morini	27	0	27	0
	DF	(Italy) ITA	Luciano Spinosi	29	0	29	0
	MF	(Italy) ITA	Franco Causio	28	2	28	2
	MF	(Italy) ITA	Antonello Cuccureddu	26	12	26	12
	MF	(Italy) ITA	Giuseppe Furino	24	0	24	0
	MF	(Italy) ITA	Fabio Capello	27	4	27	4
	FW	(Italy) ITA	Pietro Anastasi	23	16	22+1	16
	FW	(Italy) ITA	Roberto Bettega	24	8	23+1	8
	GK	(Italy) ITA	Massimo Piloni	0	0	0	0
	FW	(Brazil) BRA	José Altafini	21	7	16+5	7
	DF	(Italy) ITA	Gianpietro Marchetti	15	0	14+1	0
	DF	(Italy) ITA	Claudio Gentile	13	0	9+4	0
	MF	(Italy) ITA	Fernando Viola	8	0	7+1	0
	DF	(Italy) ITA	Giorgio Mastropasqua	2	0	0+2	0
	GK	(Italy) ITA	Rosario Vitolo	0	0	0	0
	FW	(Italy) ITA	Giuliano Musiello	0	0	0	0
	FW	(Italy) ITA	Paolo Rossi				

- Source: http://calcio-seriea.net/presenze/1973/730/

== See also ==
- Carlo Fontanelli (2001). "La storia della Coppa Italia 1970-2000". Empoli. GEO Edizioni. pp. 27–33.
- Arrigo Beltrami, ed. (1974). "Almanacco illustrato del calcio 1975". Modena: Arrigo Beltrami. Edizioni Panini. pp. 117–471.
