= 1981 Coppa Italia final =

33rd Coppa Italia final
- Event: 1980–81 Coppa Italia
Roma	Torino
2	2
- After extra time Roma won 4–2 on penalties

First leg
Roma	Torino
1	1
- Date: 13 June 1981
- Venue: Stadio Olimpico, Rome
- Referee: Claudio Pieri

Second leg
Torino	Roma
1	1
- After extra time
- Date: 17 June 1981
- Venue: Stadio Comunale di Torino, Turin
- Referee: Alberto Michelotti

The 1981 Coppa Italia final was the final of the 1980–81 Coppa Italia. The match was played over two legs on 13 and 17 June 1981 between Roma and Torino. Roma won 4–2 on penalties after the matches ended 2–2 on aggregate.

== First leg ==
13 June 1981
20:30

Roma	1–1	Torino
Ancelotti 31'		Santarini 59' (o.g.)

Stadio Olimpico, Rome
Referee: Claudio Pieri

Roma	Torino

GK	1	(Italy) Franco Tancredi
RB	2	(Italy) Vincenzo Romano
CB	6	(Italy) Sergio Santarini (c)
CB	4	(Italy) Maurizio Turone
LB	2	(Italy) Domenico Maggiora
DM	8	(Italy) Agostino Di Bartolomei
CM	5	(Brazil) Falcão
CM	10	(Italy) Carlo Ancelotti
RW	11	(Italy) Roberto Scarnecchia
CF	9	(Italy) Paolo Alberto Faccini
LW	7	(Italy) Bruno Conti
Manager:
(Sweden) Nils Liedholm

GK	1	(Italy) Giuliano Terraneo
RB	2	(Italy) Agatino Cuttone
CB	5	(Italy) Luigi Danova
SW	6	(Italy) Renato Zaccarelli	(substituted off) 28'
LB	3	(Italy) Roberto Salvadori
DM	4	(Italy) Domenico Volpati
CM	10	(Italy) Claudio Sclosa
CM	8	(Italy) Eraldo Pecci
RW	7	(Italy) Dante Bertoneri
CF	9	(Italy) Paolino Pulici (c)	(substituted off) 67'
LW	11	(Italy) Francesco Graziani
Substitutes:
DF		(Italy) Daniele Davin	(substituted on) 28'
MF		(Italy) Vincenzo D'Amico	(substituted on) 67'
Manager:
(Italy) Romano Cazzaniga

== Second leg ==
17 June 1981
20:30

Torino	1–1 (a.e.t.)	Roma
Cuttone 37'		Di Bartolomei 23' (pen.)
Penalties
Pecci (penalty missed); Sclosa (penalty scored); Bertoneri (penalty scored); Graziani (penalty missed)	2–4	(penalty scored) Ancelotti; (penalty scored) Conti; (penalty scored) Santarini; (penalty missed) Di Bartolomei; (penalty scored) Falcao

Stadio Comunale di Torino, Turin
Referee: Alberto Michelotti

Torino	Roma

GK	1	(Italy) Giuliano Terraneo
RB	2	(Italy) Agatino Cuttone
CB	3	(Italy) Luigi Danova
SW	5	(Italy) Renato Zaccarelli	(substituted off) 98'
LB	6	(Italy) Domenico Volpati
DM	4	(Italy) Patrizio Sala
CM	7	(Italy) Claudio Sclosa
CM	8	(Italy) Eraldo Pecci
RW	9	(Italy) Dante Bertoneri
CF	10	(Italy) Paolino Pulici (c)	(substituted off) 75'
LW	11	(Italy) Francesco Graziani
Substitutes:
LW		(Italy) Roberto Salvadori	(substituted on) 75'
DF		(Italy) Daniele Davin	(substituted on) 98'
Manager:
(Italy) Romano Cazzaniga

GK	1	(Italy) Franco Tancredi
RB	2	(Italy) Vincenzo Romano
CB	4	(Italy) Maurizio Turone	(substituted off) 120'
CB	6	(Italy) Romeo Benetti
LB	3	(Italy) Domenico Maggiora
DM	8	(Italy) Agostino Di Bartolomei (c)
CM	5	(Brazil) Falcão
CM	10	(Italy) Carlo Ancelotti
RW	7	(Italy) Bruno Conti
CF	9	(Italy) Roberto Pruzzo	(substituted off) 46'
LW	11	(Italy) Roberto Scarnecchia
Substitutes:
MF		(Italy) Luca Birigozzi	(substituted on) 46'
DF		(Italy) Sergio Santarini	(substituted on) 120'
Manager:
(Sweden) Nils Liedholm
