= 1972–73 Juventus FC season =

Italian football club season

Juventus Football Club
1972–73 season
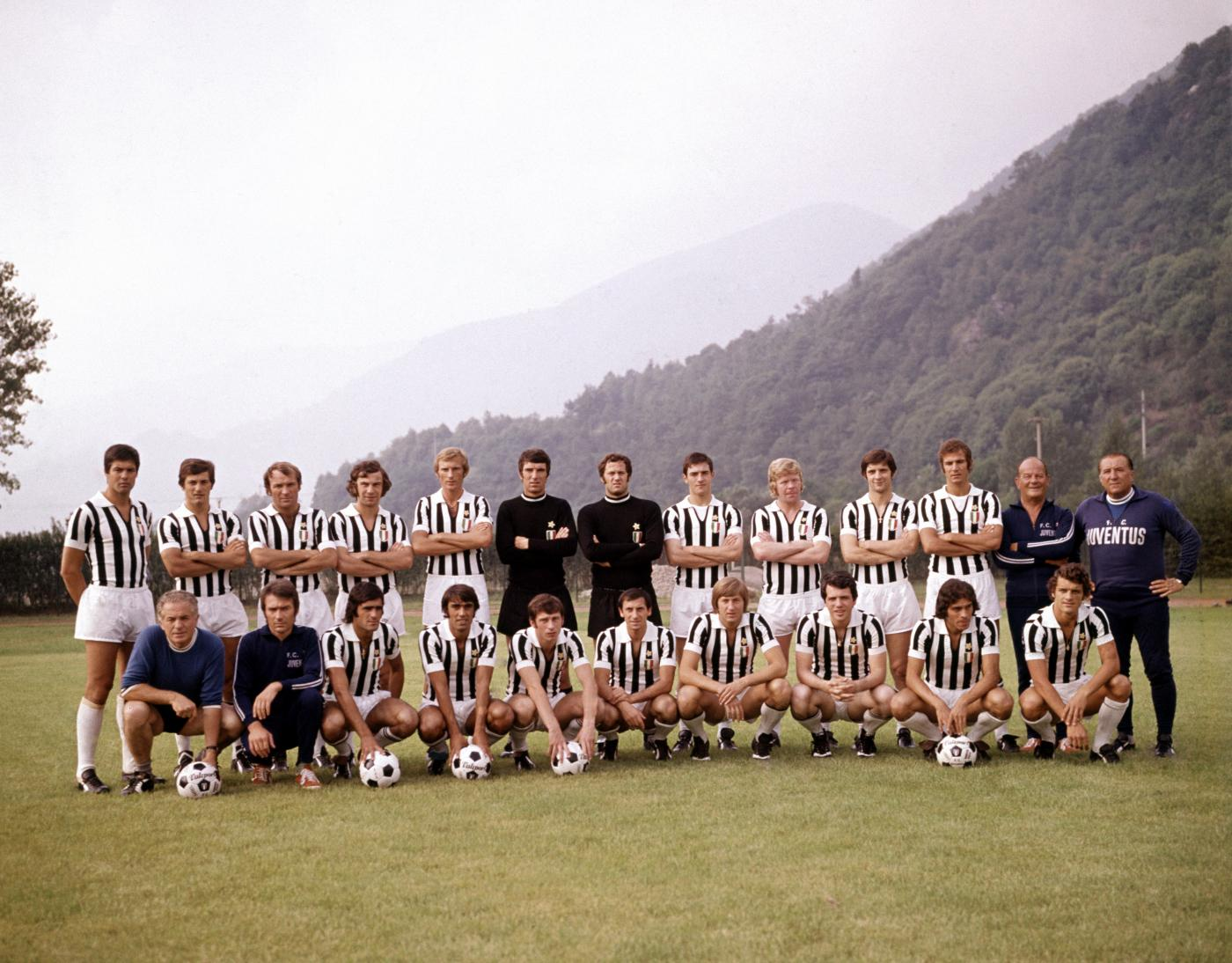
- Chairman: Giampiero Boniperti
- Manager: Čestmír Vycpálek
- Stadium: Comunale
- Serie A: 1st (in 1973-74 European Cup)
- Coppa Italia: Final
- European Cup: Final
- Top goalscorer: League: Altafini (9); All: Anastasi, Causio (13)
- Average home league attendance: 42,813
Home colours	Away colours

During 1972–73 season Juventus competed in Serie A, Coppa Italia and European Cup.

== Summary ==
Cestmir Vycpalek added 30-yrs-old goalkeeper Dino Zoff and veteran forward José Altafini from SSC Napoli to the team seeking to retain the league and the European Cup.

The team won the league, however lost the finals of European Cup against Johan Cruijff's Ajax and Coppa Italia.

== Squad ==
Note: Flags indicate national team as defined under FIFA eligibility rules; some limited exceptions apply. Players may hold more than one non-FIFA nationality.

Pos.	Nation	Player
GK	ITA	Massimo Piloni
GK	ITA	Dino Zoff
DF	ITA	Vincenzo Chiarenza
DF	ITA	Silvio Longobucco
DF	ITA	Francesco Morini
DF	ITA	Sandro Salvadore (captain)
DF	ITA	Luciano Spinosi
DF	ITA	Giuseppe Zaniboni
MF	ITA	Fabio Capello
MF	ITA	Franco Causio
MF	ITA	Antonello Cuccureddu

Pos.	Nation	Player
MF	ITA	Giuseppe Furino
MF	FRG	Helmut Haller
MF	ITA	Domenico Maggiora
MF	ITA	Alberto Marchetti
MF	ITA	Gianpietro Marchetti
MF	ITA	Adriano Novellini
MF	ITA	Gianluigi Savoldi (II)
FW	BRA	José Altafini
FW	ITA	Pietro Anastasi
FW	ITA	Tiziano Ascagni
FW	ITA	Roberto Bettega

=== Transfers ===
In
Pos.	Name	from	Type
GK	Dino Zoff	SSC Napoli	
FW	Jose Altafini	SSC Napoli	

Out
Pos.	Name	to	Type
GK	Pietro Carmignani	SSC Napoli	
FW	Adriano Novellini	Bologna FC	

== Competitions ==
=== Serie A ===
==== League table ====
Pos	Team	Pld	W	D	L	GF	GA	GD	Pts	Qualification or relegation
1	Juventus (C)	30	18	9	3	45	22	+23	45	Qualification to European Cup
2	Milan	30	18	8	4	65	33	+32	44	Qualification to Cup Winners' Cup
3	Lazio	30	16	11	3	33	16	+17	43	Qualification to UEFA Cup
4	Fiorentina	30	16	5	9	39	26	+13	37	Qualification to UEFA Cup
5	Internazionale	30	15	7	8	32	23	+9	37	Qualification to UEFA Cup

Source: Panini
(C) Champions

==== Results by round ====
Round	1	2	3	4	5	6	7	8	9	10	11	12	13	14	15	16	17	18	19	20	21	22	23	24	25	26	27	28	29	30
Ground	A	H	A	H	A	H	A	H	H	A	A	H	H	A	H	H	A	H	A	H	A	H	A	A	H	H	A	A	H	A
Result	W	D	D	D	L	D	D	W	W	W	W	W	D	W	W	W	D	W	D	L	W	D	W	L	W	W	W	W	W	W
Position	1	1	4	5	7	8	8	5	4	4	3	1	2	1	1	1	2	1	1	2	2	2	2	3	3	3	3	2	2	1

Source: Competitive matches
A = Away; H = Home; W = Win; D = Draw; L = Loss; P = Postponed; = Leader, qualified to 1973–74 European Cup; = 1973–74 UEFA Cup; = Relegation to 1973–74 Serie B

==== Matches ====
24 September 1972 1	Bologna	0–2	Juventus	Bologna
		Report	46' Causio; 80' Anastasi	Stadium: Comunale; Referee: Fulvio Pieroni

1 October 1972 2	Juventus	1–1	Hellas Verona	Turin
	Salvadore 85'	Report	50' Luppi	Stadium: Comunale; Referee: Riccardo Lattanzi

29 October 1972 3	Lazio	1–1	Juventus	Rome
	Chinaglia 14' (pen.)	Report	20' Bettega	Stadium: Stadio Olimpico; Referee: Francesco Francescon

29 October 1972 4	Juventus	2–2	Milan	Turin
	Salvadore 70'; Causio 75'	Report	32' Bigon; 76' Rivera	Stadium: Comunale; Referee: Fulvio Pieroni

5 November 1972 5	Torino	2–1	Juventus	Turin
	P. Pulici 6', 63'	Report	77' Anastasi	Stadium: Comunale; Referee: Fabio Monti

12 November 1972 6	Juventus	1–1	Sampdoria	Turin
	Causio 62' (pen.)	Report	69' Rossinelli	Stadium: Comunale; Referee: Francesco Panzino

19 November 1972 7	Napoli	1–1	Juventus	Naples
	Mariani 72'	Report	42' Capello	Stadium: Stadio San Paolo; Referee: Domenico Serafino

26 November 1972 8	Juventus	2–0	Cagliari	Turin
	Mancin 33' (o.g.); Causio 42'	Report		Stadium: Comunale; Referee: Renzo Torelli

3 December 1972 9	Juventus	2–1	Fiorentina	Turin
	Haller 60'; Altafini 70'	Report	41' Saltutti	Stadium: Comunale; Referee: Alberto Michelotti

10 December 1972 10	Palermo	0–1	Juventus	Palermo
		Report	36' Altafini	Stadium: Stadio La Favorita; Referee: Paolo Toselli

17 December 1972 11	Lanerossi	0–2	Juventus	Vicenza
		Report	8' Altafini; 25' Anastasi	Stadium: Stadio Romeo Menti; Referee: Motta

24 December 1972 12	Juventus	2–0	Ternana	Turin
	Causio 32'; Altafini 60'	Report		Stadium: Comunale; Referee: Gialluisi

30 December 1972 13	Juventus	0–0	Atalanta	Turin
		Report		Stadium: Comunale; Referee: Calì

7 January 1973 14	Inter	0–2	Juventus	Milan
		Report	32' Altafini; 85' Anastasi	Stadium: Stadio San Siro; Referee: Lo Bello

21 January 1973 15	Juventus	1–0	Roma	Turin
	Altafini 24'	Report		Stadium: Comunale; Referee: Panzino

28 January 1973 16	Juventus	2–0	Bologna	Turin
	Anastasi 65', 89'	Report		Stadium: Comunale; Referee: Gussoni

4 February 1973 17	Hellas Verona	0–0	Juventus	Verona
		Report		Stadium: Stadio Marcantonio Bentegodi; Referee: Lo Bello

11 February 1973 18	Juventus	1–0	Lazio	Turin
	Bettega 18'	Report		Stadium: Comunale; Referee: Angonese

18 February 1973 19	Milan	2–2	Juventus	Milan
	Rivera 44' (pen.); Biasiolo 85'	Report	12' Bettega; 50' G. Marchetti	Stadium: Stadio San Siro; Referee: Pieroni

4 March 1973 20	Juventus	0–2	Torino	Turin
		Report	59' (pen.) P. Pulici; 72' Agroppi	Stadium: Comunale; Referee: Paolo Toselli

11 March 1973 21	Sampdoria	0–1	Juventus	Genoa
		Report	49' Capello	Stadium: Stadio Luigi Ferraris; Referee: Lo Bello

17 March 1973 22	Juventus	0–0	Napoli	Turin
		Report		Stadium: Comunale; Referee: Bernardis

25 March 1973 23	Cagliari	0–1	Juventus	Cagliari
		Report	61' Altafini	Stadium: Stadio Sant'Elia; Referee: Angonese

7 April 1973 24	Fiorentina	2–1	Juventus	Florence
	Saltutti 46'; Desolati 84'	Report	78' (pen.) Causio	Stadium: Comunale; Referee: Serafino

15 April 1973 25	Juventus	4–1	Palermo	Turin
	Bettega 2'; S. Landini 13' (o.g.); Causio 45'; Haller 47'	Report	18' Ballabio	Stadium: Comunale; Referee: Lenardon

21 April 1973 26	Juventus	3–2	Lanerossi	Turin
	Bettega 1', 86'; Berti 78' (o.g.)	Report	33' Faloppa; 75' Galuppi	Stadium: Comunale; Referee: Trinchieri

29 April 1973 27	Ternana	2–3	Juventus	Terni
	Selvaggi 37'; Luchitta 77'	Report	20', 21' Bettega; 49' Causio	Stadium: Stadio Libero Liberati; Referee: Motta

6 May 1973 28	Atalanta	0–2	Juventus	Bergamo
		Report	43' Capello; 54' G. Marchetti	Stadium: Comunale; Referee: Francescon

13 May 1973 29	Juventus	2–1	Inter	Turin
	G. Marchetti 4'; Altafini 41' (pen.)	Report	87' Corso	Stadium: Comunale; Referee: Panzino

20 May 1973 30	Roma	1–2	Juventus	Rome
	Spadoni 29'	Report	61' Altafini; 87' Cuccureddu	Stadium: Stadio Olimpico; Referee: Lo Bello

=== Coppa Italia ===
==== First round ====
27 August 1972 1	Juventus	3–0	Foggia	Turin
	Furino 41'; Capello 66'; Causio 68' (pen.)			Stadium: Comunale; Referee: Lazzaroni

30 August 1972 2	Novara	0–1	Juventus	Novara
			90' (pen.) Causio	Stadium: Comunale; Referee: Serafino

3 September 1972 3	Juventus	0–0	Hellas Verona	Turin
				Stadium: Comunale; Referee: Alberto Michelotti

6 September 1972 4	Varese	1–1	Juventus	Varese
	Prato 9'		50' Anastasi	Stadium: Stadio Franco Ossola; Referee: Ciacci

==== Second round ====
16 May 1973 1	Juventus	1–1	Reggiana	Turin
	Maggiora 41'		73' Donina	Stadium: Comunale; Referee: Moretto

3 June 1973 2	Bologna	0–0	Juventus	Bologna
				Stadium: Comunale; Referee: Torelli

17 May 1973 3	Inter	1–1	Juventus	Milan
	Boninsegna 65'		29' Causio	Stadium: Stadio San Siro; Referee: Michelotti

3 June 1973 4	Reggiana	1–2	Juventus	Reggio Emilia
	Zandoli 4'		17', 71' Anastasi	Stadium: Mirabello; Referee: Casarin

24 June 1973 5	Juventus	4–3	Bologna	Turin
	Haller 19', 69' (pen.); Capello 49'; G.L. Savoldi 80'		24' R. Vieri; 40' Novellini; 54' G. Savoldi	Stadium: Comunale; Referee: Lazzaroni

27 June 1973 6	Juventus	4–2	Inter	Turin
	Causio 28'; Longobucco 68'; Anastasi 86', 89'		37' S. Mazzola; 42' Boninsegna	Stadium: Comunale; Referee: Barbaresco

==== Final ====
1 July 1973	Milan	1–1 (a.e.t.) (5–2 p)	Juventus	Rome
	Benetti 50' (pen.)		15' Bettega	Stadium: Stadio Olimpico; Referee: Angonese
	Penalties
	Schnellinger (penalty scored); Benetti (penalty scored); Chiarugi (penalty scored); Biasiolo (penalty scored); Magherini (penalty scored)		(penalty scored) Causio; (penalty missed) Anastasi; (penalty missed) R. Bettega; (penalty missed) Spinosi; (penalty scored) Cuccureddu

=== European Cup ===
==== First round ====
13 September 1972 1	Olympique Marseille (France)	1–0	(Italy) Juventus	Lyon, France
	Salvadore 52' (o.g.)			Stadium: Stade de Gerland; Referee: (West Germany) Biwersi

27 September 1972 2	Juventus (Italy)	3–0 (3–1 agg.)	(France) Olympique Marseille	Turin, Italy
	Bettega 3', 37'; Haller 43'			Stadium: Comunale; Referee: (Bulgaria) Stanev

==== Second round ====
25 October 1972 1	Juventus (Italy)	1–0	(East Germany) Magdeburg	Turin, Italy
	Anastasi 66'			Stadium: Comunale; Referee: (Switzerland) Scheurer

8 November 1972 2	Magdeburg (East Germany)	0–1 (0–2 agg.)	(Italy) Juventus	Magdeburg, Germany
			51' Cuccureddu	Stadium: Ernst Grube Stadion; Referee: (France) Machin

==== Quarter-finals ====
7 March 1973 1	Juventus (Italy)	0–0	(Hungary) Ujpesti Dozsa	Turin, Italy
				Stadium: Comunale; Referee: (Netherlands) Boosten

21 March 1973 2	Ujpesti Dozsa (Hungary)	2–2 (2–2a agg.)	(Italy) Juventus	Budapest, Hungary
	Bene 1'; Tóth 13'		30' Altafini; 57' Anastasi	Stadium: Megyeri Úti Stadium; Referee: (Belgium) Delcourt

==== Semi-finals ====
11 April 1973 1	Juventus (Italy)	3–1	(England) Derby County	Turin, Italy
	Altafini 28', 83'; Causio 65'		30' Hector	Stadium: Stadio Comunale; Referee: (West Germany) Schulenburg

25 April 1973 2	Derby County (England)	0–0 (1–3 agg.)	(Italy) Juventus	Derby, England
				Stadium: Baseball Ground; Referee: (Portugal) Marques Lobo

==== Final ====
30 May 1973	Ajax (Netherlands)	1–0	(Italy) Juventus	Beograd, Serbia
	Rep 5'			Stadium: Stadion Crvena zvezda Attendance: 91,000; Referee: (Socialist Federal Republic of Yugoslavia) Gugulović

== Statistics ==
=== Players statistics ===
No.	Pos	Nat	Player	Total		Serie A		Coppa		European Cup	
No.	Pos	Nat	Player	Apps	Goals	Apps	Goals	Apps	Goals	Apps	Goals
	GK	(Italy) ITA	Zoff	50	-37	30	-22	11	-10	9	-5
	DF	(Italy) ITA	Marchetti	45	3	27+1	3	10	0	7	0
	DF	(Italy) ITA	Morini	37	0	24	0	5	0	8	0
	DF	(Italy) ITA	Salvadore	46	2	28	2	9	0	9	0
	DF	(Italy) ITA	Spinosi	40	0	25	0	7	0	8	0
	MF	(Italy) ITA	Causio	47	13	27+1	8	10	4	9	1
	MF	(Italy) ITA	Furino	44	1	27	0	8	1	9	0
	MF	(Italy) ITA	Capello	45	5	26+1	3	9	2	9	0
	FW	(Brazil) BRA	Altafini	35	12	19+4	9	6	0	6	3
	FW	(Italy) ITA	Anastasi	47	13	26+1	6	11	5	9	2
	FW	(Italy) ITA	Bettega	43	11	25+2	8	9	1	7	2
	GK	(Italy) ITA	Piloni	0	0	0	0	0	0	0	0
	DF	(Italy) ITA	Cuccureddu	40	2	16+6	1	9	0	9	1
	MF	(West Germany) FRG	Haller	35	5	16+2	2	10	2	7	1
	DF	(Italy) ITA	Longobucco	22	1	12	0	6	1	4	0
	MF	(Italy) ITA	Savoldi	15	1	2+4	0	9	1		
	DF	(Italy) ITA	Zaniboni	4	0	0	0	4	0		
	DF	(Italy) ITA	Maggiora	1	1	0	0	1	1		
	DF	(Italy) ITA	Marchetti	1	0	0	0	1	0		
	FW	(Italy) ITA	Novellini	1	0	0	0	1	0		
	MF	(Italy) ITA	Ascagni	1	0	0	0	1	0		
	DF	(Italy) ITA	Chiarenza	1	0	0	0	1	0		

- Source: http://calcio-seriea.net/presenze/1972/707/
