= Maggiora (surname) =

Maggiora is an Italian surname. Notable people with the surname include:

- Domenico Maggiora, Italian professional football coach and a former player
- Eduardo della Maggiora, Chilean triathlete and businessman
- Pier Paolo Maggiora, Italian architect

== See also ==
- Maggiora
- Maggiora (disambiguation)
