= Davin =

Davin is a surname and masculine given name. It may refer to the following people:

== Surname ==
- Dan Davin (1913–1990), New Zealand author of Irish descent
- Daniele Davin (born 1962), Italian retired footballer
- Delia Davin (1944–2016), British sinologist
- Eric Davin (born 1947), American historian
- Félix Davin (1807–1836), French journalist, novelist and poet
- Franco Davín (born 1970), Argentinian tennis player and coach
- Joe Davin (1942–2013), Scottish footballer
- Martin Davin (1905–1957), Scottish footballer
- Maurice Davin (1842–1927), Irish farmer, co-founder and first president of the Gaelic Athletic Association
- Niko Davin (born 1997), Namibian cricketer
- Nicholas Flood Davin (1840–1901), Irish lawyer, politician and journalist
- Patrick Davin (1962–2020), Belgian orchestra conductor
- Tom Davin, American businessman and CEO
- William Davin (1890–1956), Irish station-master and politician

== Given name ==
- Davin Bellamy (born 1994), American football player
- Davin Joseph (born 1983), American former National Football League player
- Davin Meggett (born 1990), American former football player
- Davin Pierre, American college baseball coach and former player
- Davin Prasath (born 1991), Cambodian actress, model, philanthropist and beauty pageant titleholder
- Davin White (born 1981), American basketball player
