= Inalpi Arena =

Indoor arena in Turin, Italy

- Palasport Olimpico; PalaOlimpico; PalaIsozaki
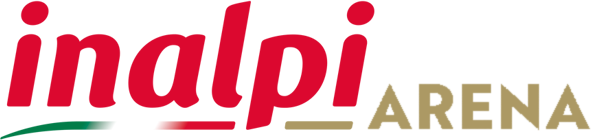

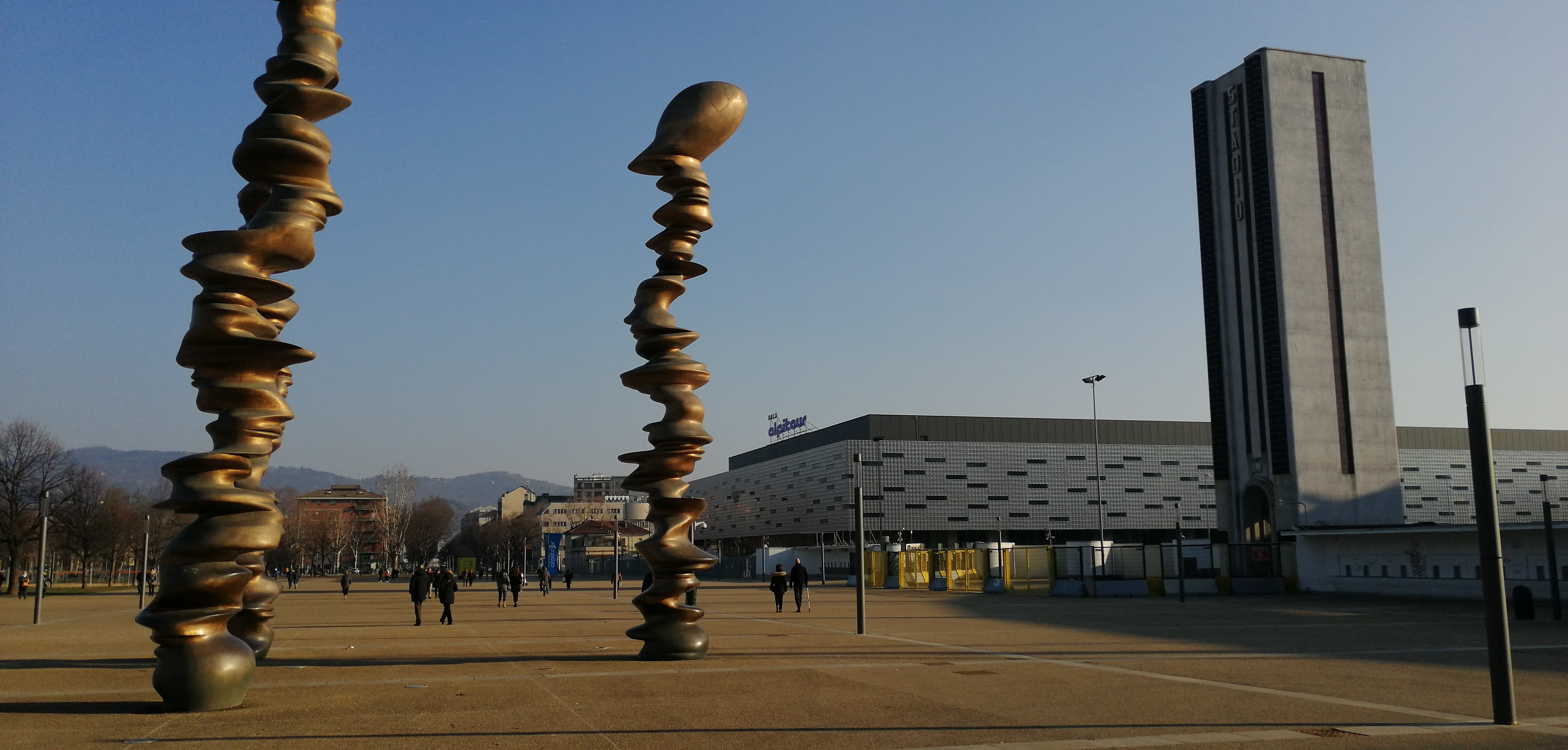
- Interactive map of Inalpi Arena
- Full name: Palasport Olimpico
- Former names: Pala Alpitour (2014–2024)
- Address: Corso Sebastopoli 123
- Location: Turin, Italy
- Coordinates: 45°02′30″N 7°39′08″E
- Owner: City of Turin
- Operator: Parcolimpico Srl
- Capacity: 14,350 (ice hockey); 16,600 (basketball); 15,800 (volleyball); 15,657 (center stage); 13,347 (end stage)

Construction
- Groundbreaking: July 2003; 23 years ago
- Built: 2003–2005
- Opened: 3 December 2005; 20 years ago
- Renovated: 2018; 8 years ago
- Cost: €87 million
- Architects: Arata Isozaki; Andrea Maffei; Pier Paolo Maggiora; Marco Brizio
- Builders: Vitali SpA; Torno Internazionale SpA
- Structural engineer: Lorenzon Techmec System SpA
- Services engineers: Carlo Gavazzi Impianti SpA; Edoardo Lossa SpA

Website
- www.inalpiarena.it

Palasport Olimpico, officially operating with the sponsored name Inalpi Arena except during events prohibiting sponsorship names when it is usually known as simply PalaOlimpico, or occasionally PalaIsozaki after its architect, is a multi-purpose indoor arena located within Torino Olympic Park in the Santa Rita district of Turin, Italy. Opened in December 2005, the arena has a seating capacity of 16,600 when it is configured for basketball, and it is the largest indoor sporting arena in Italy.

The arena was originally built at a cost of €87 million, for the 2006 Winter Olympics, and along with the Torino Esposizioni, it hosted the ice hockey events. It is a few metres east of the Olympic Stadium. Since 2021, the Inalpi Arena has been the host venue of the tennis ATP Finals.

Between 8 August 2014 and January 2024, the arena was renamed to Pala Alpitour following a sponsorship deal with Italian travel company Alpitour and in November 2020 became the fifth arena, the first in Italy, to be admitted as a member to the International Venue Alliance circuit. On 11 January 2024, a five-year agreement was announced with Inalpi (a dairy company based in Moretta) to become the new naming sponsor of the arena, which thus becomes Inalpi Arena.

== Construction ==
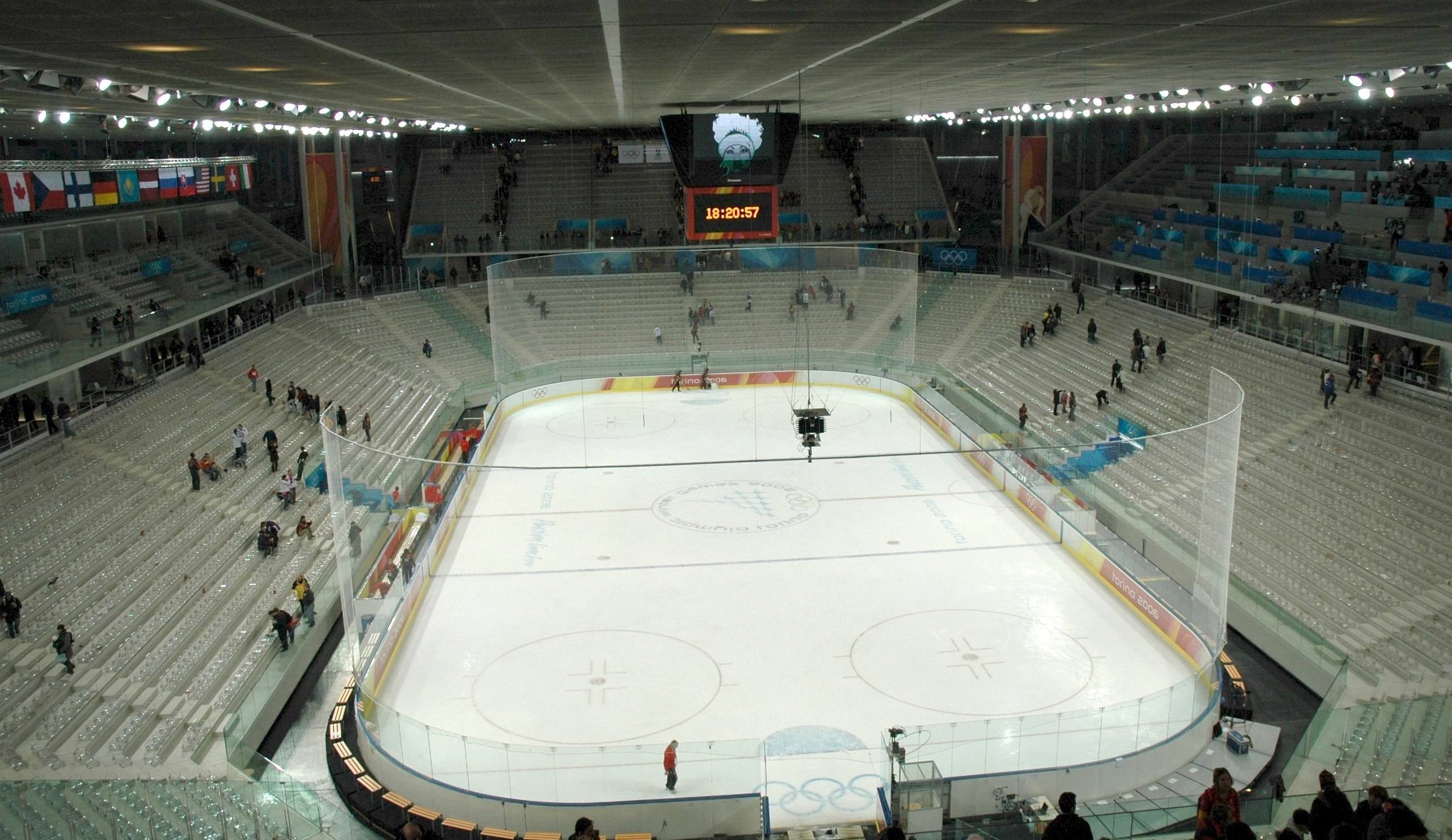
The arena hosted ice hockey games during the 2006 Winter Olympics

The design of the building was the subject of an international competition, which was won in June 2002. The winning bid consisted of a team composed of Arata Isozaki and Andrea Maffei Associates, who directed the design, with ArchA SpA of Turin, Arup Italia of Milan and Favero & Milan Ingegneria, engineer Giuseppe Amaro and the architect Marco Brizio.

The final project bears the joint signature of the architects Isozaki and Pier Paolo Maggiora of ArchA SpA and is part of the larger complex called the Central Olympic Complex (Torino Olympic Park) consisting of the Olympic Stadium, water sports facility Palazzo del Nuoto and the park in Piazza d'Armi.

== Architecture and design ==
The futuristic building's exterior has a strict rectangular Cartesian coated stainless steel and glass structure, with a base of 183 by 100 metres. It is spread over four levels, of which two are underground (up to 7.5 metres below ground) and two outdoors (up to 12 metres high). The overall length of the structure is about 200 metres. The structure, designed to be a veritable factory of events, using the words of its architect. The arena is completely flexible and adaptable in its internal structure, and with the arrangement of the stands. Due to a modern system of movable and retractable bleachers, and also the option of a temporary movable deck. The structure's acoustics are also adaptable.

== Events ==
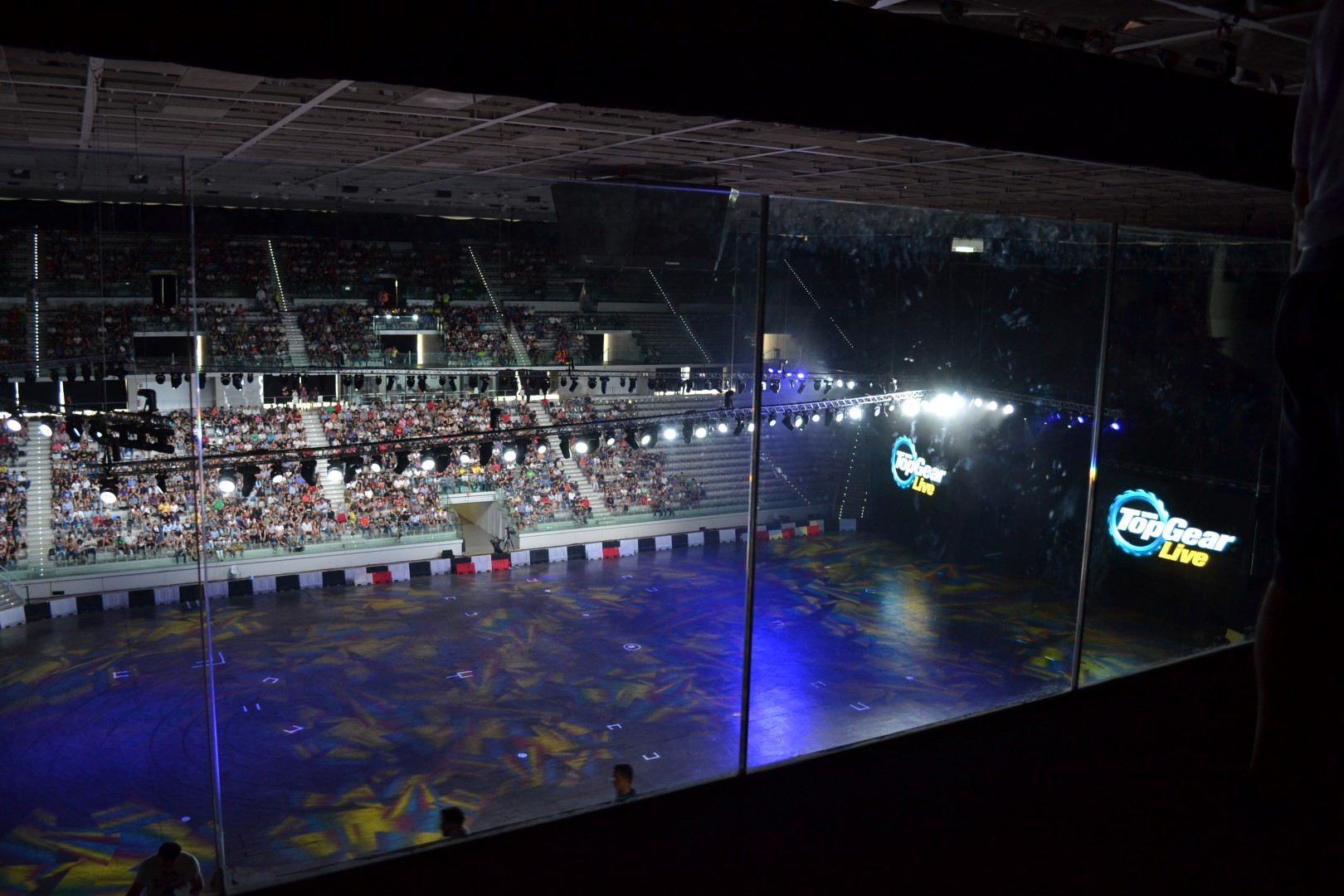
Arena hosting Top Gear Live in July 2014

The arena is a kind of "magic box", and was designed to host many different types of events beyond the Olympics. It serves as a venue for events including concerts, exhibitions, trade fairs, conferences, and various sports, such as basketball, ice hockey, curling and volleyball. Since its opening, the Inalpi Arena has become one of Italy's most booked venues for large-scale concerts. It is also the largest capacity venue in Italy for these types of events, with the allowed maximum capacities set at 15,657 for general admission center-stage concerts, and 13,347 maximum capacity for general admission end-stage concerts.

In addition to concerts, the arena has also been able to host successful touring shows and musicals over the years such as Notre Dame de Paris, Romeo and Juliet, Cirque du Soleil, and occasionally sporting events including WWE professional wrestling in 2007, 2011, in 2014 and 2018, and in 2026 including Italy's first WWE PLE Clash in Italy, and the car shows Top Gear Live in July 2014 and Fast & Furious Live in September 2018.

=== Sports ===
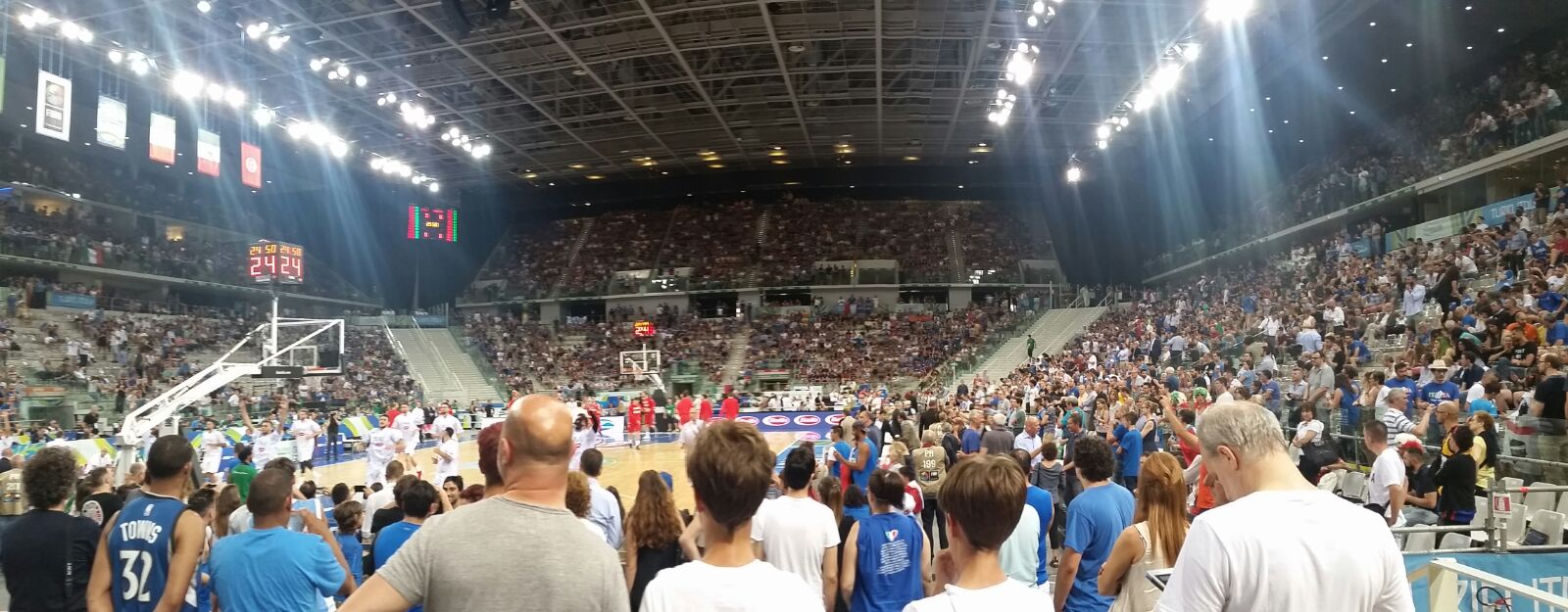
Inside view of the arena during the 2016 FIBA World Olympic Qualifying Tournament

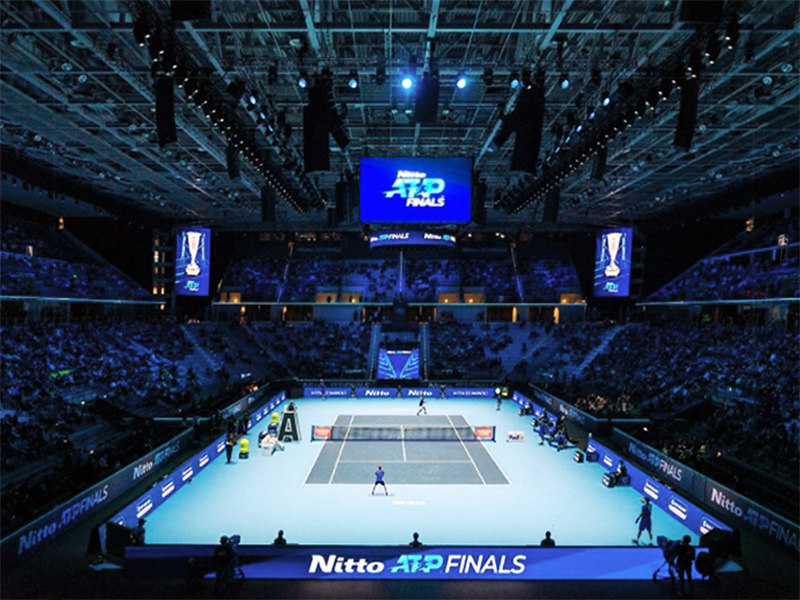
Arena during ATP Finals 2021

It was inaugurated on 13 December 2005, with the name PalaOlimpico, during a friendly match in ice hockey between the men's national teams of Italy and Canada. Between 10 and 26 February 2006, it was the main venue for the ice hockey events of the 2006 Winter Olympics, hosting the main matches of the first group stage and then all those of the final stages of the men's and women's tournaments.

In January 2007, the venue hosted the opening and closing ceremonies and selected ice hockey matches of the XXIII Winter Universiade.

In basketball, the venue hosted the 2008–09 EuroCup Basketball final stage, and the 2016 FIBA World Olympic Qualifying Tournament. The Palasport was due to host the 2010–11 season's Final Four of the EuroLeague, as announced on February 16, 2010, but the event was later moved to the Palau Sant Jordi, in Barcelona. It was one of the three main venues of the 2016 FIBA World Olympic Qualifying Tournaments for Men, which was held in Italy, the Philippines, and Serbia on July 4–10, 2016.

The mixed martial arts events Bellator 152 and Bellator 176 were held at the arena on 16 April 2016 and 8 April 2017 respectively. The third and final round of the 2018 FIVB Volleyball Men's World Championship were also held at the venue.

From 2021 to 2027, the arena will host the tennis ATP Finals, marking the first time in history in which Italy will host the tournament.

=== Music ===
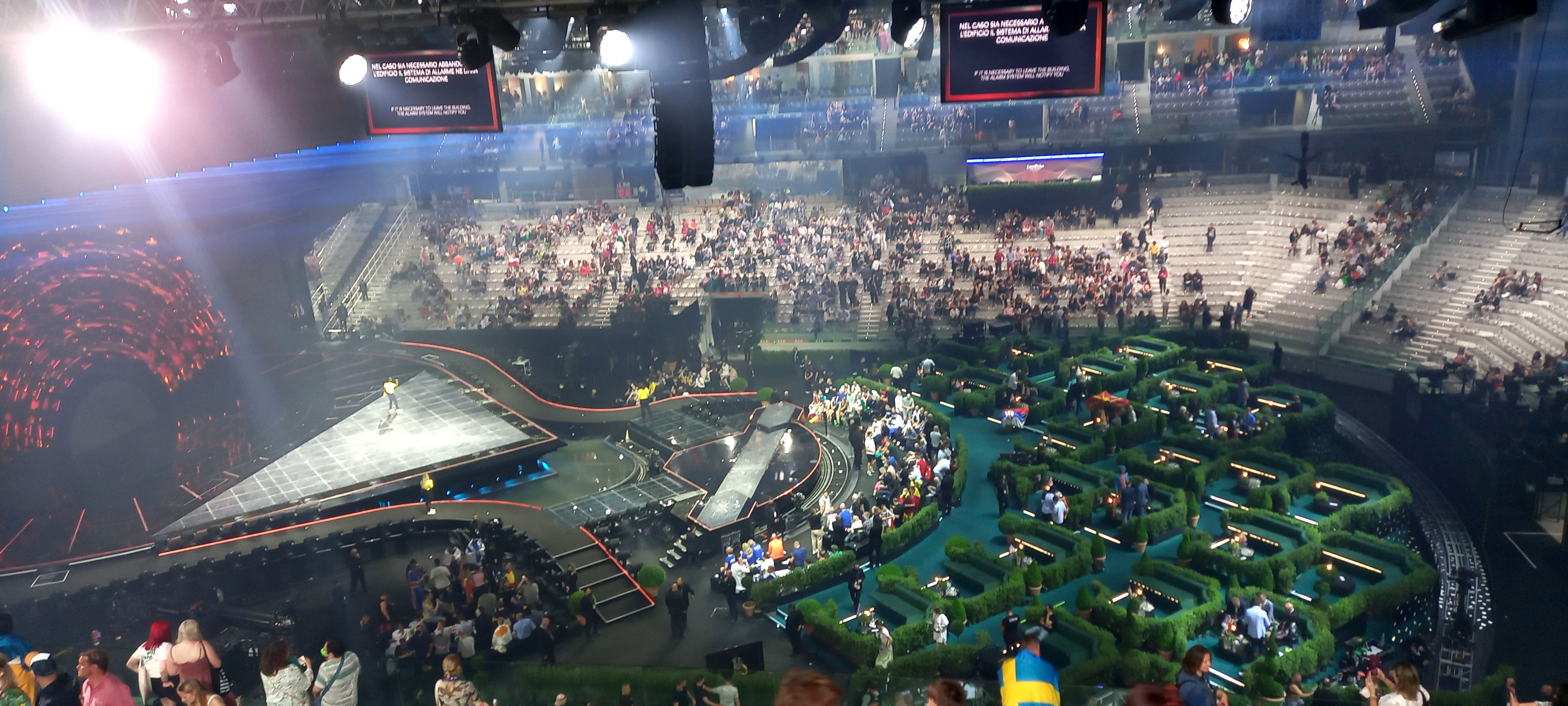
Inside view of the arena during the Eurovision Song Contest 2022.

Inalpi Arena has become one of the main venues for music events in Italy. Artists such as Bob Dylan, Madonna, Rihanna, U2, Florence and the Machine, 5 Seconds of Summer, Lana Del Rey, Ariana Grande, Shakira, Soy Luna, Renato Zero, Tiziano Ferro, Il Volo, Metallica, Harry Styles, Tame Impala, Violetta, Giorgia, Elisa, Marco Mengoni and Twice have performed in the arena.

On 8 October 2021, the European Broadcasting Union (EBU) and the Italian broadcaster RAI announced that the venue would host the Eurovision Song Contest 2022, following Italy's victory at the 2021 contest in Rotterdam, Netherlands with the song "Zitti e buoni", performed by Måneskin. The semi-finals of the contest took place on 10 and 12 May, and the grand final on 14 May. It was the first time that Turin hosted the contest and the third time that Italy has hosted the contest overall, with the last being in Rome in 1991.

== See also ==
- List of indoor arenas in Italy
- List of European ice hockey arenas
- List of tennis stadiums by capacity

Events and tenants
Preceded by Spodek; Katowice	FIVB Volleyball Men's World Championship; Final Venue; 2018	Succeeded by Spodek; Katowice
Preceded by Rotterdam Ahoy; Rotterdam	Eurovision Song Contest; Venue; 2022	Succeeded by Liverpool Arena; Liverpool
Preceded by The O_{2} Arena; London	ATP Finals; Venue; 2021–2025	Succeeded by TBD
