= Marchioro =

Marchioro is an Italian surname. Notable people with the surname include:

- Alessandra Marchioro (born 1993), Brazilian swimmer
- Giuseppe Marchioro (born 1936), Italian footballer and manager
