= Savoldi =

Savoldi is an Italian surname. Notable people with the surname include:

- Angelo Savoldi (1914–2013), American professional wrestler and wrestling promoter
- Gianluca Savoldi (born 1975), Italian footballer
- Gianluigi Savoldi (1949–2008), Italian footballer
- Giuseppe Savoldi (1947–2026), Italian footballer and coach
- Joe Savoldi (1908–1974), Italian-born American football player and professional wrestler
- Joseph Savoldi (born 1957), American professional wrestler
