= Piergiorgio =

Piergiorgio is a masculine Italian given name. Notable people with the name include:

- Piergiorgio Cortelazzo (born 1969), Italian politician
- Piergiorgio Farina (1933–2008), Italian jazz violinist
- Piergiorgio Negrisolo (born 1950), Italian footballer
- Piergiorgio Nesti (1931–2009), Italian Roman Catholic archbishop
- Piergiorgio Odifreddi (born 1950), Italian mathematician and writer
- Piergiorgio Welby (1945–2006), Italian poet, painter and activist
- Pier Giorgio Frassati (1901-1925), Italian Catholic saint and activist

== See also ==
- Piero, first part of the name
- Giorgio (name), second part of the name
