= Torino Olympic Park =

Group of parks in Turin, Italy

Torino Olympic Park is a group of parks that was created to manage all of the venue and facilities used and built for the 2006 Winter Olympics held in Turin, Italy, and facilities surrounding the Turin region.

Facilities and locations included:

- Bardonecchia (snowboarding)
- Cesana Pariol (bobsleigh, luge, and skeleton)
- Cesana San Sicario (alpine skiing and biathlon)
- Oval Lingotto (speed skating)
- Palasport Olimpico (ice hockey)
- Palavela (figure skating and short track speed skating)
- Pinerolo (curling)
- Pragelato (cross-country skiing, Nordic combined, and ski jumping)
- Sauze d'Oulx (freestyle skiing)
- Sestriere (alpine skiing)
- Stadio Olimpico (Olympics opening and closing ceremonies)
- Torino Esposizioni (ice hockey).
