= Maggiora (disambiguation) =

Maggiora is an comune in the Province of Novara in the Italian region Piedmont.

Maggiora may also refer to:

- Maggiora (manufacturer), Italian coachbuilder from Moncalieri near Turin
- Maggiora (surname), Italian surname
