= Agatino Cuttone =

Italian footballer and manager (born 1960)

Personal information
- Date of birth: 18 February 1960 (age 66)
- Place of birth: Adrano, Italy
- Height: 1.79 m (5 ft 10 in)
- Position: Defender

Senior career*
Years	Team	Apps	(Gls)
1979–1980	Reggina	28	(1)
1980–1982	Torino	41	(1)
1982–1983	Catanzaro	21	(1)
1983–1991	Cesena	207	(5)
1991–1992	Perugia	25	(0)
1992–1993	Baracca Lugo	16	(0)

International career
1981	Italy U21	1	(0)

Managerial career
- 1993–1998: Cesena (youth)
- 1998–1999: Marsala
- 1999–2000: Pro Vercelli
- 2000–2001: Catanzaro
- 2001–2002: Cesena
- 2002–2004: Gualdo
- 2004–2005: Giulianova
- 2005–2006: Gubbio
- 2007–2008: Catanzaro
- 2009: Colligiana
- 2010: Benevento
- 2010–2011: Modena (Primavera)
- 2011–2012: Modena
- 2013: Santarcangelo
- 2013–2014: San Marino Calcio
- 2014–2015: Santarcangelo
- 2017: Fano
- * Club domestic league appearances and goals

Agatino Cuttone (born 18 February 1960) is an Italian football manager and former player who most recently managed Fano.

== Career ==
In 1979, Cuttone began his professional career as a defender for Reggina. He later also played for the Torino, Catanzaro, Cesena. Perugia, and Baracca Lugo.

In 1993, he started his coaching career with the Cesena youth team. In 1998, he coached the Marsala. Later on worked with Italian clubs. On 17 December 2013, he became the new coach of San Marino Calcio in place of sacked Fernando José de Argila Irurita
