= Eduardo della Maggiora =

Chilean triathlete and businessman (born 1980)

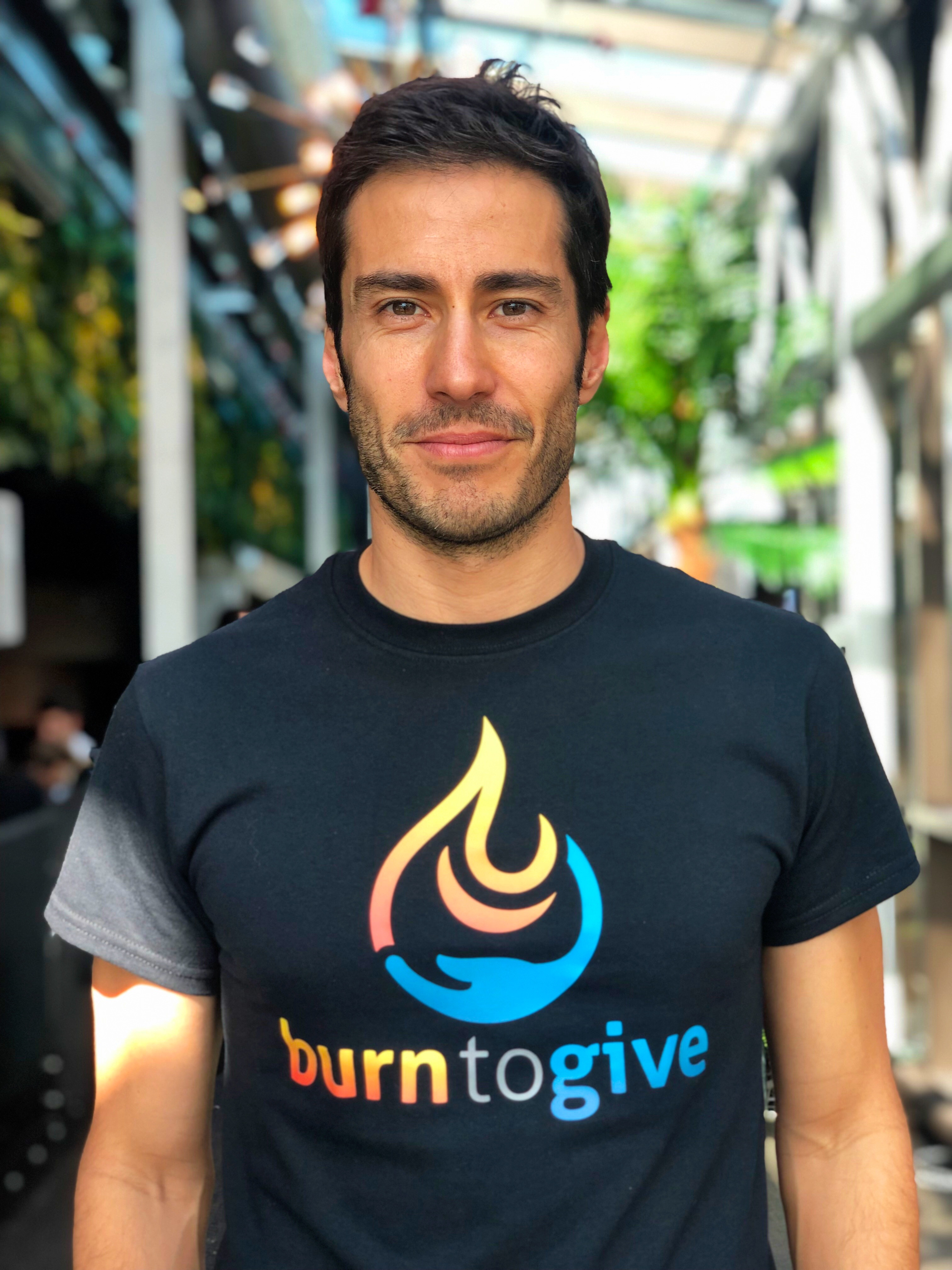
- Born: October 10, 1980 (age 45); Santiago de Chile
- Education: Pontificia Universidad Católica de Chile
- Occupations: Businessman, Social Entrepreneur, Triathlete
- Known for: World Champion runner-up of the Ironman 70.3 World Championships; Finisher of the Ironman World Championships in Hawaii
- Notable work: Founder & CEO of Betterfly Founder & CEO of Burn To Give founder
- Spouse: Paloma Fernandez Bossonney
- Children: Mia and Max
- Website: edellamaggiora.com

Eduardo della Maggiora (born October 10, 1980, Santiago, Chile) is a Chilean triathlete and businessman.

He is a two-time world champion runner-up in his category at the Ironman 70.3 World Championships, as well as a three-time finisher of the Ironman World Championships in Hawaii.

In 2014 he was named one of Chile's “100 leaders under 35” by El Mercurio and in 2020 he was named “Entrepreneur of the Year 2019” by UDD.

He is the founder and chief executive officer of Burn to Give.

== Professional career ==
Upon graduation as an industrial engineer in 2004, he began his career working at J.P. Morgan. In 2013 he quit and moved to Africa, to work as a volunteer teaching English and Mathematics to primary school students in Moshi, Tanzania.

In 2014 he founded PIC Parks, a platform that preserves natural parks and ecosystems using crowdfunding.

In August 2014, he founded Tyndall Group, an investment banking boutique focused on mergers and acquisitions. In 2017 Tyndall Group was named Best boutique investment bank in Latin America by Global Finance Magazine.

In 2014 he was named one of Chile's “100 leaders under 35” by El Mercurio.

In March 2018, he founded Burn to Give, a socially driven platform that transforms healthy lifestyles into positive social impact .

In April 2019, he was appointed chief executive officer of the organizing committee of the Santiago 2023 Pan American and Parapan American Games.

In 2019 he was selected as Endeavor Entrepreneur at the 90th Endeavor International Selection Panel in Atlanta, USA.

In 2020 he was named “Entrepreneur of the Year 2019” by Universidad del Desarrollo, in the “Social Entrepreneur” category.

== Ironman triathlon ==
On October 10, 2015, he competes for the first time in Ironman Kona, in Hawaii. A year later, he qualifies to represent Chile at the Ironman 70.3 World Championships in Mooloolaba, Australia finishing as a world champion runner-up in his category. In November 2016, he wins his category and finishes third overall at Ironman Panama City in Florida, USA.

In September 2017, he finishes once again as a world champion runner-up in his category, representing Chile at the Ironman 70.3 World Championships in Chattanooga, Tennessee. A month later, he finishes sixth in his category representing Chile at the Ironman World Championships in Hawaii.

In October 2018, he competes once again in Hawaii and finishes as the second fastest Latin American overall, with the best Chilean finish time ever in his category.
