= Eric Davin =

American historian and author (born 1947)

Eric Leif Davin
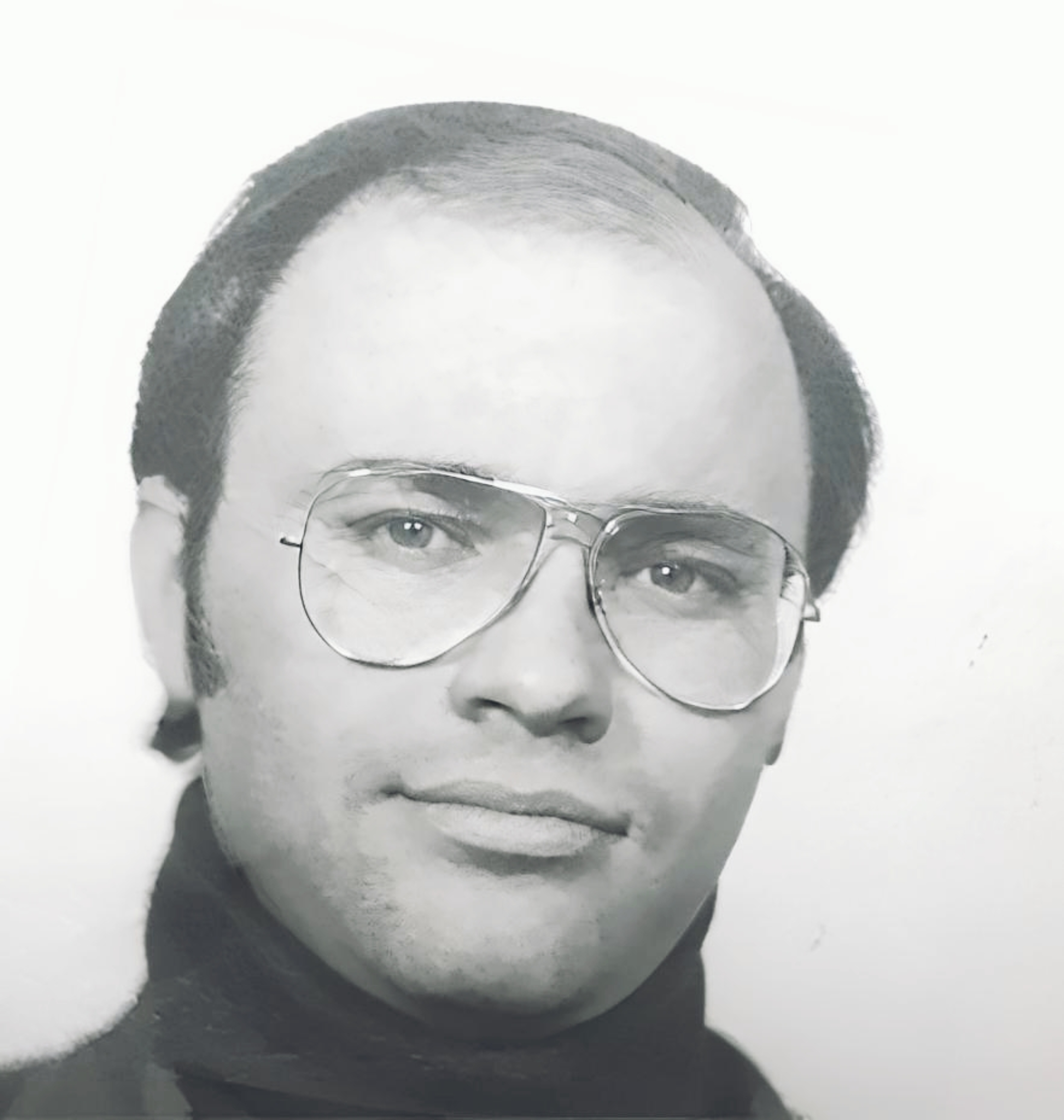
- Born: Eric Leif Davin; December 19, 1947 (age 78); Dyersburg, Tennessee
- Education: Harvard Graduate School of Education (1972-73); University of Pittsburgh (MA, 1989; PhD, 1999)
- Occupations: Author, Historian

Eric Leif Davin (born 1947) is an American historian and author known for his work on labor history, political movements, and early science fiction.

== Biography ==
Davin was born on December 19, 1947, in Dyersburg, Tennessee. He studied at the Harvard Graduate School of Education from 1972 to 1973, then attended the University of Pittsburgh, from which he earned a Master of Arts in history (1989) and a Doctor of Philosophy in American history (1999).

Davin joined the University of Pittsburgh faculty in 1980 where he taught American history and popular culture. He remained on the Pittsburgh faculty until 2020.

== Publications ==
Davin’s scholarship spans labor history, political movements, and the history of science fiction. His books include Pioneers of Wonder (1999), based on interviews with early science fiction writers, and Partners in Wonder (2006), which examined the participation of women in the genre between 1926 and 1965.

He later published Crucible of Freedom (2010), a study of working-class political activity in western Pennsylvania during the New Deal period, followed by Radicals in Power (2012), which analyzed former 1960s activists who entered public office.
