= Daniele Davin =

Italian footballer (born 1962)

Personal information
- Date of birth: 7 July 1962 (age 64)
- Place of birth: Turin, Italy
- Height: 1.70 m (5 ft 7 in)
- Position: Defender

Senior career*
Years	Team	Apps	(Gls)
1980–1981	Torino		
1981–1982	Pistoiese		
1982–1985	Parma		
1985–1989	Cagliari		
1989–1992	Gubbio		
- * Club domestic league appearances and goals

Daniele Davin (born 7 July 1962) is a retired Italian football defender. With Torino he became runner-up in the 1981 Coppa Italia, playing both legs of the final.
