= Innocenzo Donina =

Italian footballer (1950–2020)

Personal information
- Date of birth: 16 July 1950
- Place of birth: Piancogno, Lombardy, Italy
- Date of death: 19 March 2020 (aged 69)
- Place of death: Bergamo, Lombardy, Italy
- Height: 1.79 m (5 ft 10 in)
- Position: Midfielder

Senior career*
Years	Team	Apps	(Gls)
1968–1969	Atalanta B.C.	0	(0)
1969–1970	→ U.S. Cremonese	17	(1)
1970–1971	Atalanta B.C.	10	(0)
1971–1972	U.S. Cremonese	14	(3)
1972–1976	Reggio Audace F.C.	132	(4)
1976–1977	L.R. Vicenza Virtus	36	(1)
1977–1978	S.S.C. Bari	31	(0)
1978–1979	U.S. Cremonese	13	(1)
1979–1980	A.S.D. Romanese	22	(3)
1980–1981	U.S. Soresinese	?	(?)
1981–1984	A.C. Ponte San Pietro Isola S.S.D.	97	(1+)
1984–1985	C.G. Virescit Boccaleone	26	(4)
1985–1986	A.C. Palazzolo	26	(0)
- * Club domestic league appearances and goals

Innocenzo Donina (Italian pronunciation: [innoˈtʃɛntso ˈdoniːna]; 16 July 1950 – 19 March 2020) was an Italian professional footballer.

== Biography ==
He played in all three of Italy's top professional leagues for several teams.

On 19 March 2020, Donina died from COVID-19, amid its pandemic in Italy.
