= Giorgio Mastropasqua =

Italian footballer and manager

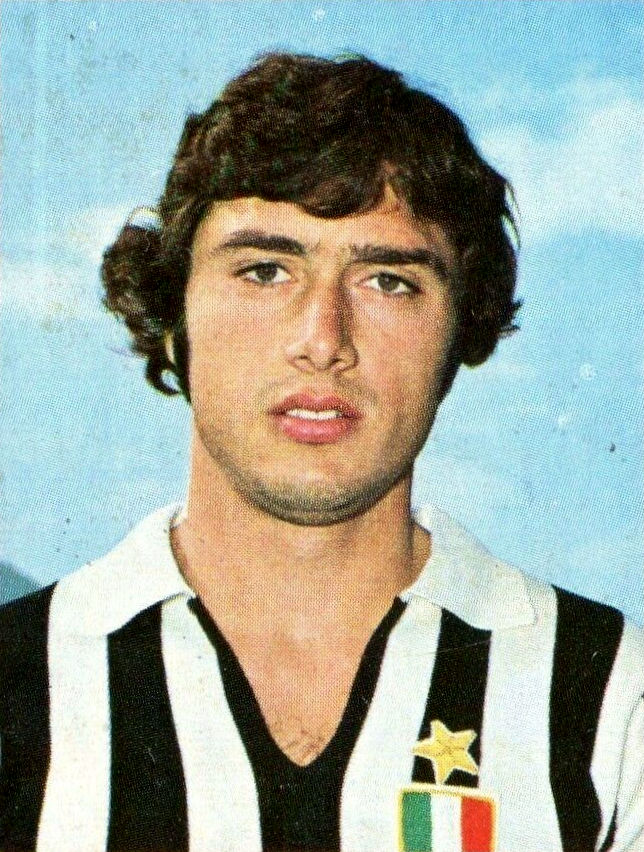
- Mastropasqua with Juventus in 1973

Personal information
- Date of birth: 13 July 1951 (age 75)
- Place of birth: Rivoli, Italy
- Height: 1.82 m (6 ft 0 in)
- Positions: Defender; midfielder

Senior career*
Years	Team	Apps	(Gls)
1969–1970	Juventus	0	(0)
1970–1971	Perugia	2	(0)
1971–1973	Ternana	63	(3)
1973–1974	Juventus	2	(0)
1974–1979	Atalanta	135	(13)
1979–1980	Bologna	26	(3)
1980–1982	Lazio	69	(5)
1982–1984	Catania	44	(1)
1984–1986	Piacenza	60	(0)
1986–1988	Pavia	62	(1)

Managerial career
- 2011: AlzanoCene
- * Club domestic league appearances and goals

Giorgio Mastropasqua (born 13 July 1951) is an Italian former football player and manager, who played as a sweeper.

== Playing career ==
Mastropasqua was born in Rivoli, Piedmont. Throughout his playing career, which spanned from 1969 to 1988, he played for prestigious teams in the Italian top-flight, such as Juventus, Ternana, Atalanta, Bologna and Lazio.

== Coaching career ==
In the summer of 2011, Mastropasqua was named manager of AlzanoCene in the Italian Serie D, but he resigned after a few months in autumn after a disappointing start to the season

== Style of play ==
Mastropasqua often played as a sweeper, and was known for revolutionising the role in Italy during the 1970s under his Ternana manager Corrado Viciani and the team's dynamic and hard-working possession–based system, which focussed on short passing on the ground. He served as one of the first modern exponents of the position, due to his unique technical characteristics, namely a player who was not only tasked with defending and protecting the back-line, but also advancing out of the defence into midfield and starting attacking plays with their passing after winning back the ball.

== Honours ==
Ternana

- Serie B: 1971–72
