= Vincenzo Romano =

Italian footballer

Personal information
- Date of birth: 12 March 1956 (age 70)
- Place of birth: Capaccio, Italy
- Height: 1.82 m (5 ft 11 1/2 in)
- Position: Defender

Senior career*
Years	Team	Apps	(Gls)
1976–1978	Rimini	24	(2)
1978–1980	Avellino	38	(2)
1980–1981	Roma	22	(0)
1981–1984	Genoa	73	(2)
1984–1985	Bologna	37	(1)
1985–1988	Avellino	46	(0)
1988–1989	Empoli	7	(0)
- * Club domestic league appearances and goals

Vincenzo Romano (born 12 March 1956 in Capaccio) is an Italian former professional footballer who played as a central defender. He played for 9 seasons (179 games, 4 goals) in Serie A for Avellino, Roma and Genoa.
