= Giuseppe Zaniboni =

Italian footballer

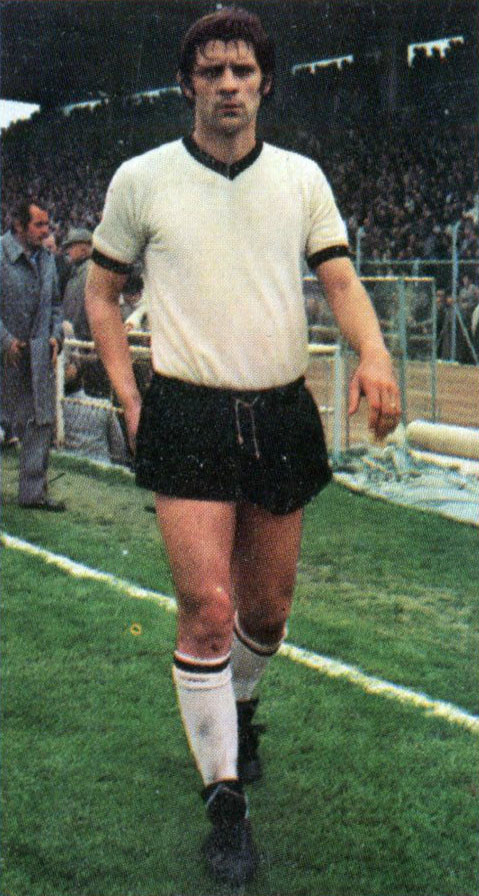
- Zaniboni with Cesena in 1974

Personal information
- Date of birth: 13 March 1949 (age 77)
- Place of birth: Stagno Lombardo, Italy
- Height: 1.79 m (5 ft 10 1/2 in)
- Position: Defender

Senior career*
Years	Team	Apps	(Gls)
1965–1967	Cremonese	14	(0)
1967–1968	Atalanta	0	(0)
1968–1969	Cremonese	0	(0)
1969–1970	Atalanta	24	(1)
1970–1971	Juventus	3	(0)
1971–1972	Mantova	14	(0)
1972–1973	Juventus	0	(0)
1973–1976	Cesena	30	(0)
1976–1977	Monza	0	(0)
1977–1978	Cesena	18	(0)
1978–1979	Forlì	26	(1)
- * Club domestic league appearances and goals

Giuseppe Zaniboni (born 13 March 1949 in Stagno Lombardo) is a retired Italian professional footballer who played as a defender.

== Honours ==
Juventus

- Serie A champion: 1972–73.
