= Giovanni Carnevali =

Italian football executive (born 1960)

Personal information
- Full name: Giovanni Carnevali
- Date of birth: 19 November 1960 (age 65)
- Place of birth: Milan, Italy

Managerial career
- Years: Team
- 2014–2026: Sassuolo (CEO and general manager)
- 2026–: Juventus (CEO and general manager)

Giovanni Carnevali (born 19 November 1960) is an Italian football executive who is the chief executive officer and general manager of Juventus.

After a career as a player and amateur club owner in the 1980s, Carnevali worked in management roles at Monza, Pavia, Como and Ravenna, before founding the sports marketing company Master Group Sport in 1996. He was chief executive and general manager of Sassuolo from 2014 to 2026, where he became known for his player-trading strategy, before being appointed to the same roles at Juventus in June 2026.

== Early life and career ==
Born in Milan on 19 November 1960, Carnevali played in his youth for Pro Sesto and Solbiatese. In the 1980s, together with his father Augusto and a scout, he bought the amateur club Milanese, where he first worked alongside future executive Ariedo Braida.

Also in the 1980s, Carnevali met Giuseppe Marotta, with whom he worked at Monza for three years. He then was general manager of Pavia, before joining the management of Como and later Ravenna between 1990 and 1993.

== Master Group Sport ==
In 1996, Carnevali founded Master Group Sport, a sports marketing and events company that has worked in partnership with the Italian Football Federation (FIGC), among others. He was the company's chief executive officer.

== Sassuolo ==
In the summer of 2014, Sassuolo owner Giorgio Squinzi appointed Carnevali as chief executive officer and general manager of the club.

His tenure was defined by a corporate strategy centred on player trading. Through extensive scouting and the subsequent sale of players including Davide Frattesi, Gianluca Scamacca and Manuel Locatelli, the club generated hundreds of millions of euros in capital gains.

On the sporting side, under his leadership the club from Emilia-Romagna retained its place in Serie A for nine consecutive seasons, qualifying for the 2016–17 UEFA Europa League in the 2015–16 season, before being relegated at the end of the 2023–24 season. The club returned to Serie A the following season. Among the most notable developments during Carnevali's tenure was the inauguration in 2019 of the Mapei Stadium – Città del Tricolore, a multifunctional training facility.

== Juventus ==
On 12 June 2026, Carnevali was appointed chief executive officer and general manager of Juventus, replacing Damien Comolli.
