= Luca Birigozzi =

Italian former footballer

Personal information
- Date of birth: 24 April 1960 (age 66)
- Place of birth: Milan, Italy
- Height: 1.82 m (5 ft 11 1/2 in)
- Position: Midfielder

Senior career*
Years	Team	Apps	(Gls)
1977–1979	Solbiatese	33	(9)
1979–1980	Ternana	13	(1)
1980–1981	Roma	3	(0)
1981–1984	Pisa	53	(5)
1984–1985	Sambenedettese	18	(2)
1985–1986	Sorrento	22	(7)
1986	Pisa	1	(0)
1986–1987	Benevento	27	(6)
1987–1989	Solbiatese	?	(7)
- * Club domestic league appearances and goals

Luca Birigozzi (born 24 April 1960 in Milan) is an Italian former footballer who played as a midfielder. He made 170 appearances in the Italian professional leagues, and played for three seasons (31 games, 2 goals) in Serie A with Roma and Pisa.
