= Giuseppe Marchioro =

Italian football player and manager (1936–2026)

Personal information
- Date of birth: 13 March 1936
- Place of birth: Milan, Italy
- Date of death: 6 August 2026 (aged 90)
- Place of death: Cesena, Italy
- Position: Forward

Youth career
- 1949–1959: AC Milan

Senior career*
Years	Team	Apps	(Gls)
- Legnano
- Varese
1967–1966	Catanzaro		

Managerial career
- 1970–1972: Verbania
- 1972–1973: Alessandria
- 1973–1975: Como
- 1975–1976: Cesena
- 1976–1977: AC Milan
- 1977–1978: Cesena
- 1978–1982: Como
- 1982: Avellino
- 1983: Cesena
- 1984–1985: Ancona
- 1985–1986: Prato
- 1986–1987: Barletta
- 1987–1988: Foggia
- 1988–1994: Reggiana
- 1994: Genoa
- 1995: Venezia
- 1996–1997: Cesena
- 1997: Triestina
- * Club domestic league appearances and goals

Giuseppe Marchioro (13 March 1936 – 6 August 2026) was an Italian professional football player and manager.

== Playing career ==
As a footballer, Marchioro grew up in AC Milan youth team, winning a Torneo di Viareggio in 1957. Later, he played only in lower Italian categories. With Catanzaro he reached a Coppa Italia final in 1966, scoring a goal in the last match against Fiorentina.

== Coaching career ==
Between 1968 and 1970 Marchioro attended Liedholm and Radice during their work in Monza.

Marchioro began to coach on 1970, training Verbania. In 1973, with Alessandria, he won the first edition of Coppa Italia Semiprofessionisti (now Coppa Italia Lega Pro). In 1975 his Como was promoted in Serie A; next year he led Cesena for the first time in UEFA Cup.

After a delusive first experience in a top club (Milan, season 1976–77), he coached in lower series. In 1988, he signed for Reggiana, which he led for few years from Serie C1 reaching Serie A for the first time in its history.

== Later life and death ==
Marchioro retired in 1997. He died on 6 August 2026, at the age of 90.
