= Giuliano Musiello =

Italian footballer (1954–2024)

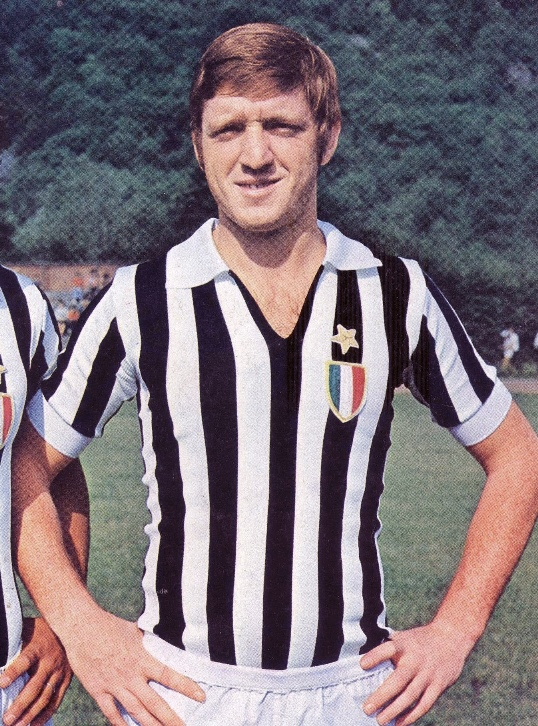
- Musiello with Juventus in 1973

Personal information
- Date of birth: 12 January 1954
- Place of birth: Torviscosa, Italy
- Date of death: 23 January 2024 (aged 70)
- Place of death: Saluzzo, Italy
- Height: 1.82 m (6 ft 0 in)
- Position: Striker

Senior career*
Years	Team	Apps	(Gls)
1970–1972	SPAL	24	(8)
1972–1973	Atalanta	25	(2)
1973–1974	Juventus	0	(0)
1974–1976	Atalanta	32	(6)
1975–1976	Avellino	32	(18)
1976–1978	Roma	54	(10)
1978–1980	Genoa	29	(4)
1978–1979	→ Verona (loan)	21	(3)
1980–1982	Foggia	37	(4)
1982–1984	Novara	60	(10)
1984–1985	Ravenna		
1985–1986	Cuneo	28	(3)
1986–1987	Savona	20	(4)
- * Club domestic league appearances and goals

Giuliano Musiello (12 January 1954 – 23 January 2024) was an Italian professional footballer who played as a striker. He played for four seasons (100 games, 15 goals) in Serie A for Atalanta, Roma and Verona. Musiello died on 23 January 2024, at the age of 70.
