= Giuliano Terraneo =

Italian footballer

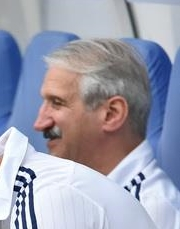

Personal information
- Full name: Giuliano Terraneo
- Date of birth: 16 October 1953 (age 73)
- Place of birth: Briosco, Italy
- Height: 1.82 m (5 ft 11 1/2 in)
- Position: Goalkeeper

Team information
- Current team: West Bromwich Albion (sporting director)

Senior career*
Years	Team	Apps	(Gls)
1972–1973	Seregno	0	(0)
1973–1977	Monza	61	(0)
1977–1984	Torino	193	(0)
1984–1986	AC Milan	60	(0)
1986–1987	Lazio	40	(0)
1987–1990	Lecce	91	(0)

Managerial career
- 1997–1998: Monza (sporting director)
- 1998–1999: Lazio (sporting director)
- 1999–2003: Inter Milan (sporting director)
- 2015–2016: Fenerbahçe (sporting director)
- 2018–: West Bromwich Albion (sporting director)
- * Club domestic league appearances and goals

Giuliano Terraneo (born 16 October 1953) is an Italian former professional footballer who played as a goalkeeper and the current director of football of West Bromwich Albion.

== Club career ==
After beginning his career with Seregno and Monza, Terraneo played for 11 seasons (321 games) in the Serie A for Italian clubs Torino Calcio, AC Milan and U.S. Lecce.

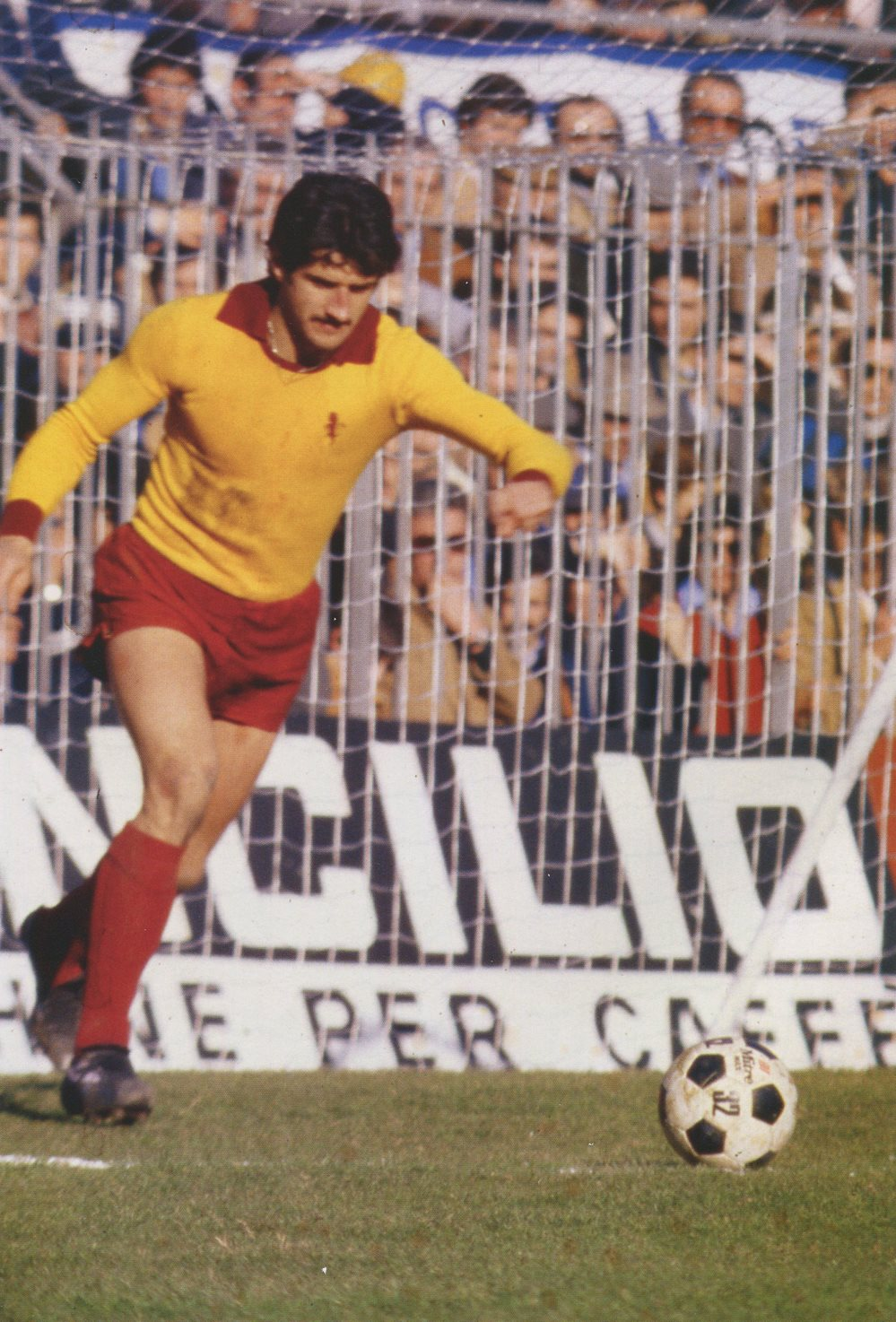
Terraneo at Torino

== Style of play ==
Terraneo was an efficient rather than spectacular goalkeeper, who was known for his excellent positional sense and composure in goal. In addition to his goalkeeping ability, Terraneo also drew attention to himself for his moustache and original goalkeeping attire: he was known for wearing goalkeeping jerseys of different colours, as well as his trademark white shorts and socks; with Torino he also wore maroon football socks, the official colour of the team. He was also known for removing his gloves when attempting to save penalties.

== Consultancy career ==
On 12 April 2018 Terraneo was appointed as technical consultant at EFL Championship club West Bromwich Albion to support their summer transfer plans following the sacking of Nick Hammond. Terraneo previously held similar positions at Monza, Lazio, Inter Milan and Fenerbahçe. Subsequently, Terraneo was replaced by Luke Dowling.

== Honours ==
Monza

- Coppa Italia Lega Pro: 1974–75
- Serie C (Girone A): 1975–76
- Anglo-Italian Cup: 1976
