= AC Cesena =

Italian football club

Cesena
- Full name: Associazione Calcio Cesena S.p.A.
- Nicknames: I Cavallucci Marini (The Seahorses); I Bianconeri (The White and Blacks)
- Founded: 1940 (86 years ago)
- Dissolved: 2018; 8 years ago
- Ground: Stadio Dino Manuzzi, Cesena, Italy
- Capacity: 23,900
Home colours	Away colours	Third colours

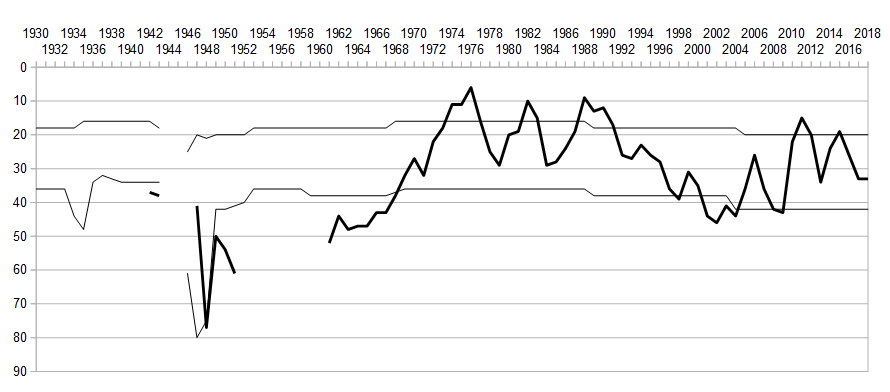
The progress of Cesena in the Italian football league structure since the club's foundation in 1940.

Associazione Calcio Cesena, commonly referred to as Cesena (Italian pronunciation: [tʃeˈzɛːna]), was an Italian football club based in Cesena, Emilia-Romagna. The club spent most of its history in professional leagues such as Serie A and Serie B, but went bankrupt and folded in 2018. The same year, the club Romagna Centro changed its name to Cesena FC, and has assumed the identity of AC Cesena.

The club was formed in 1940 and won its first promotion to Serie A in 1973. Since then, the club have been in Serie A for a total of 13 seasons, their best achievement coming in 1976 with a sixth-placed finish and a short run in the following season's UEFA Cup. The other four promotions to Serie A were achieved in 1981, 1987, 2010 (after two consecutive promotions — from the third league (Lega Pro) in 2009 and from Serie B in 2010, both won on the final day of the season) and 2014.

== History ==
Founded in 1940, Cesena reached Serie B in 1968 and were promoted to Serie A for the first time in 1973. With players such as Pierluigi Cera and Gianluigi Savoldi, the club held its own and finished a respectable 11th place in their debut season, repeating that finish the following year. In the 1975–76 season, Cesena surprised Italy by finishing sixth and subsequently qualifying for the UEFA Cup. The glory was short-lived and they would be relegated the next year.

A second promotion to Serie A followed in 1981 and finished a respectable 10th before being relegated once more in 1983, staying in Serie B for four years. After winning a play-off, they were back in Serie A for 1987–88 and enjoyed a four-year stay, being obdurate enough to just avoid relegation in this time.

After relegation in 1991, Cesena had another chance to return to Serie A in 1994. With players such as Alessandro Teodorani, Emiliano Salvetti, Luigi Piangerelli, Aldo Dolcetti, and Dario Hübner, this was a team of considerable ability. They finished level on points with Padova, however, and lost a promotion play-off which would be a bitter blow for the club, who would suffer relegation to Serie C1 in 1997. Whilst promotion followed, a relegation play-off against Pistoiese in 2000 would see them condemned to a four-year stay in the third division.

In the 2005–06 Serie B, Cesena surprisingly emerged as contenders for promotion to Serie A, ending in sixth place and being therefore qualified for the promotion play-offs. They escaped relegation the following season, but not in 2007–08.

Cesena's first campaign in Serie C1, now rebranded Lega Pro Prima Divisione, started with former Foligno boss Pierpaolo Bisoli as new head coach. Throughout the season, Cesena quickly emerged as major contenders for direct promotion, and managed to take first place in the league on Week 33, with only one game remaining and a two-point advantage to challengers Pro Patria. On the final week of the season, Cesena's 0–0 draw with Verona, coupled with Pro Patria's 0–0 draw with Padova, gave the bianconeri the league title and direct promotion back to Serie B, after only one season in the Italian third tier. Cesena went to as 3rd in Round 33, one point behind Brescia in the 2009–10 season. Cesena earned their second consecutive promotion after a 1–0 victory at Piacenza and Brescia's 2–1 loss in Padua against Padova on 30 May 2010, finishing 19 years of absence from the Serie A.

=== Serie A and B ===
Cesena returned to Serie A after 19 years of absence in 2010. After the 2011–12 season, Cesena were relegated from the top tier to the Serie B.

Since relegation Cesena also restructured their finance, which the company revered merger with intermediate holding company Cesena 1940 Srl in December 2012. The company held 98.23% shares of AC Cesena SpA. After the merger, another intermediate holding company, Opera Cesena Calcio Srl represented by Igor Campedelli (from unknown investor through Romagna Sport Srl), which previously own 65.03% shares on Cesena 1940 Srl, sold 27.6% shares of Cesena to GMG Srl, a company of Giorgio Lugaresi, who already owned 30.06% shares of Cesena 1940 Srl before the merger. On 24 April 2013 Giorgio Lugaresi was re-elected as the president of A.C. Cesena SpA. After the transactions the club also recapitalized €9.5 million during 2013–14 season in order to avoid bankruptcy, which GMG Srl through subsidiary Cesena & Co. Scarl, held 9,499,000 out of 9,500,000 shares (99.9895%) of Cesena as of 30 June 2014, with a nominal value of €1 per shares. In February 2014 Cesena was under criminal investigation for the fraud in Campedelli era. Campedelli was banned 6 months in March 2013 by FIGC.

Despite the financial difficulties, Cesena won promotion back to Serie A on 18 June 2014, winning Latina in playoffs in 4–2 aggregate. In that match, most of the players (12 out of 20) were on loan from other clubs, with only 4 players were under Cesena contract in starting lineup (Renzetti, De Feudis, Garritano and Defrel) and 4 players on the bench (Alberto Iglio, Consolini, Rodríguez and Succi). Financially, Cesena had another year of negative EBITDA in 2013–14 season, for about €11 million, if excluding windfall profit from player trading from the calculation.

In September 2016, the club and former chairman Campedelli were also sued by the prosecutor for false accounting in player-swap (Fabbri–Palumbo as well as Nagatomo–Caldirola–Garritano) Eventually the directors were inadmissible from the charge due to expiry of the legal proceeding but the club chose to plead guilty for a fine of €80,000.

In June 2018, Cesena was charged for false accounting again in the player swap with Chievo. The prosecutor request to penalize Cesena for up to 15 points, accusing the price tag in the deals were inflated. However, as Cesena was folded in 2018, the club was not penalized. An appeal to a department of Italian National Olympic Committee, stating the point deduction should be applied to 2017–18 season, causing Virtus Entella, which originally relegated in 2017–18 Serie B season, made another appeal to Tribunale Amministrativo Regionale del Lazio, for re-admission back to 2018–19 Serie B.

On 16 July 2018 Cesena declared bankruptcy and were banned from participating in 2018–19 Serie B.

== Phoenix club ==
In July 2018, A.S.D. Romagna Centro successfully applied to rename itself to "Cesena Football Club", and has since operated as a phoenix club of AC Cesena.

== Colours and badge ==
The team's colours were black and white.

== Honours ==
- Serie B:
  - Runners-up (3): 1972–73, 1980–81 (shared with Genoa), 2009–10
  - Play-off Winners (2): 1986–87, 2013–14
- Serie C/Serie C1/Lega Pro:
  - Winners (3): 1967–68, 1997–98, 2008–09
  - Play-off Winners (1): 2003–04
- Coppa Italia Serie C:
  - Winners (1): 2003–04
  - Runners-up (1):' 1997–98
- Prima Divisione:
  - Winners (1): 1940–41
- Serie D:
  - Winners (1): 1959–60
- Promozione Regionale:
  - Winners (2): 1952–53, 1956–57

== Players ==
=== Retired numbers ===
No.	Player	Nationality	Position	Reason	Ref
12	Tifosi	Italy	Not applicable	Reserved for the Cesena supporters	
21	Paolo Martelli	Italy	Defender	Posthumous recognition. Died in a car accident on 12 April 1999.	

=== Notable former players ===
This list of former players includes those who received international caps while playing for the team, made significant contributions to the team in terms of appearances or goals while playing for the team, or made significant contributions to the sport, either before they played for the team or after they left. The list is alphabetized by country, and within country listings by surname or main name used in football.

- (Albania) Erjon Bogdani
- (Albania) Florian Myrtaj
- (Algeria) Abdelkader Ghezzal
- (Argentina) Germán Denis
- (Austria) Walter Schachner
- (Brazil) Paulo Silas
- (Chile) Luis Jiménez
- (Croatia) Igor Budan
- (Italy) Massimo Agostini
- (Italy) Massimo Ambrosini
- (Italy) Alessandro Bianchi
- (Italy) Antonio Candreva
- (Italy) Simone Del Nero
- (Italy) Alberto Fontana
- (Italy) Emanuele Giaccherini
- (Italy) Dario Hübner
- (Italy) Vincenzo Iaquinta
- (Italy) Ruggiero Rizzitelli
- (Italy) Sebastiano Rossi
- (Japan) Yuto Nagatomo
- (Nigeria) Odion Jude Ighalo
- (Romania) Adrian Mutu
- (Romania) Daniel Pancu
- (San Marino) Massimo Bonini
- (Senegal) Papa Waigo
- (Uruguay) Jorge Martínez
- (Socialist Federal Republic of Yugoslavia) Vladislav Đukić
- (Socialist Federal Republic of Yugoslavia) Davor Jozić

== Technical staff ==
Position	Staff
President	(United States) John Aiello
Chief executive officer	(Italy) Corrado Di Taranto
Club manager	(Italy) Alberto Santarelli
Team manager	(Italy) Matteo Visani
Technical director	(Italy) Filippo Fusco
Team manager	(Italy) Matteo Visani
Head coach	(England) Ashley Cole
Assistant coach	(Italy) Paolo Stringara
Technical coach	(Italy) Nicola Capellini
Goalkeeper coach	(Italy) Federico Agliardi
Rehab coach	(Italy) Massimo Magrini
Athletic coach	(Italy) Giorgio D’Urbano
Health manager	(Italy) Giorgio Gandolfi
Team doctor	(Italy) Antonio Argentoni (Italy) Gianluigi Sella
Medical staff	(Italy) Stefano Valentini (Italy) Costantino Cucciniello (Italy) Francesco Canali
Nutritionist	(Italy) Michela Lantignotti
Dir. Add. Arbitrators	(Italy) Fiorenzo Treossi
Athletic trainer	(Italy) Filippo Medda
Assistant athletic trainer	(Italy) Luca Lancioni

== Managers ==
- (Austria) Karl Stürmer (1942–43)
- (Italy) Cinzio Scagliotti (1949–50)
- (Italy) Pietro Magni (1953–54)
- (Italy) Gipo Poggi (1961–62)
- (Italy) Luigi Radice (1972–73)
- (Italy) Giuseppe Marchioro (1975–76)
- (Italy) Giulio Corsini (1976–77)
- (Italy) Giuseppe Marchioro (1977–78)
- (Italy) Giancarlo Cadé (1978–79)
- (Italy) Osvaldo Bagnoli (1979–81)
- (Italy) Giovan Battista Fabbri (1981–82)
- (Italy) Bruno Bolchi (1982–83)
- (Italy) Giuseppe Marchioro (1983–84)
- (Italy) Bruno Bolchi (1986–87)
- (Italy) Alberto Bigon (1987–89)
- (Italy) Marcello Lippi (1989–91)
- (Italy) Azeglio Vicini (1992–93)
- (Italy) Bruno Bolchi (1993–95)
- (Italy) Marco Tardelli (1995–98)
- (Italy) Giuseppe Marchioro (1996–97)
- (Italy) Alberto Cavasin (1998–99)
- (Italy) Walter De Vecchi (2000–02)
- (Italy) Agatino Cuttone (2001–02)
- (Italy) Giuseppe Iachini (2002–03)
- (Italy) Fabrizio Castori (2003–07)
- (Italy) Giovanni Vavassori (2007–08)
- (Italy) Fabrizio Castori (2008)
- (Italy) Pierpaolo Bisoli (2008–10)
- (Italy) Massimo Ficcadenti (2010–11)
- (Italy) Marco Giampaolo (2011)
- (Italy) Daniele Arrigoni (2011–12)
- (Italy) Mario Beretta (2012)
- (Italy) Nicola Campedelli (2012)
- (Italy) Pierpaolo Bisoli (2012–14)
- (Italy) Domenico Di Carlo (2014–2015)
- (Italy) Massimo Drago (2015–2016)
- (Italy) Andrea Camplone (2016–2017)

== European record ==
=== UEFA Cup ===
Season	Round	Club	Home	Away	Aggregate	Reference
1976–77	First round	(East Germany) Magdeburg	3–1	0–3	3–4	
