= Ezio Motta =

Italian football referee (1931–2021)

Ezio Motta (22 May 1931 – 3 June 2021) was an Italian football referee.

== Biography ==
Enrolled in the Monza section, he began refereeing in Serie C in 1961, in Serie B he made his debut in Venice on 20 September 1964, directing Venice-Parma (1–1) in the cadet championship, he directed 95 matches, in the top flight. directed for the first time in Naples on 5 September 1965 refereeing Napoli-Spal (4–2), In Serie A he directed for nine seasons adding 69 appearances, the last in Genoa on 19 May 1974 and it was Genoa- Naples (1–2). He also directed 15 Coppa Italia matches.

In 1966 he was awarded the Florindo Longagnani Award, an award for the best rookie referee in the Italian top league. From 1970, when he was still refereeing, until 1985, he was the president of the A.I.A. of Monza.
