= Piergiorgio Negrisolo =

Italian footballer

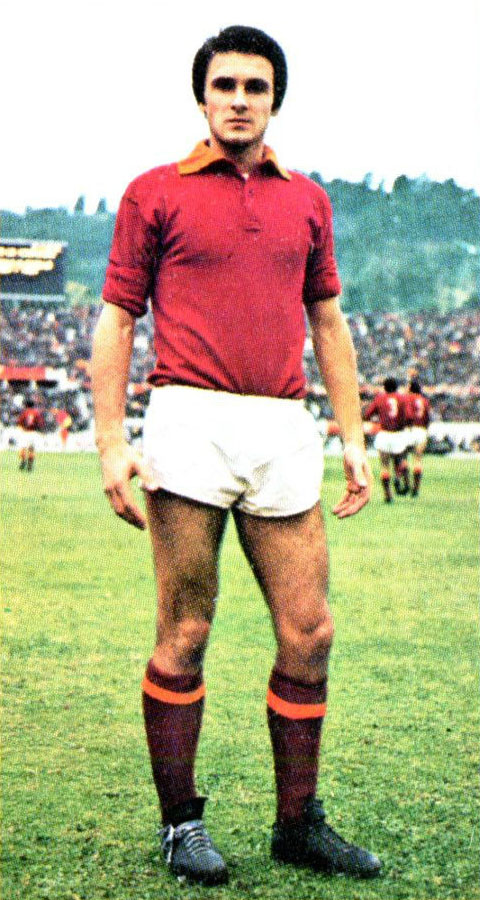
- Negrisolo with Roma in 1974

Personal information
- Date of birth: 22 July 1950 (age 76)
- Place of birth: Viadana, Italy
- Height: 1.75 m (5 ft 9 in)
- Position: Midfielder

Senior career*
Years	Team	Apps	(Gls)
1966–1967	Guastalla	25	(0)
1967–1968	Reggiana	16	(0)
1968–1973	Sampdoria	79	(2)
1973–1976	Roma	78	(7)
1976–1979	Verona	77	(3)
1979–1981	Pescara	43	(1)
1981–1982	Rimini	32	(4)
1982–1983	Campania	22	(1)
1983–1984	Carrarese	22	(0)
1984–1986	Sassuolo	37	(3)
- * Club domestic league appearances and goals

Piergiorgio Negrisolo (born 22 July 1950 in Viadana) is a retired Italian professional footballer who played as a midfielder.

== Career ==
Born in Viadana, Lombardy, Negrisolo began playing football with Guastalla. He made his Serie A debut with Sampdoria in a 1–1 draw with Torino on 6 October 1968. He played for 12 seasons (256 games, 13 goals) in the Serie A for U.C. Sampdoria, A.S. Roma, Hellas Verona F.C. and Delfino Pescara 1936.
