= Pier Paolo Maggiora =

Italian architect (born 1943)

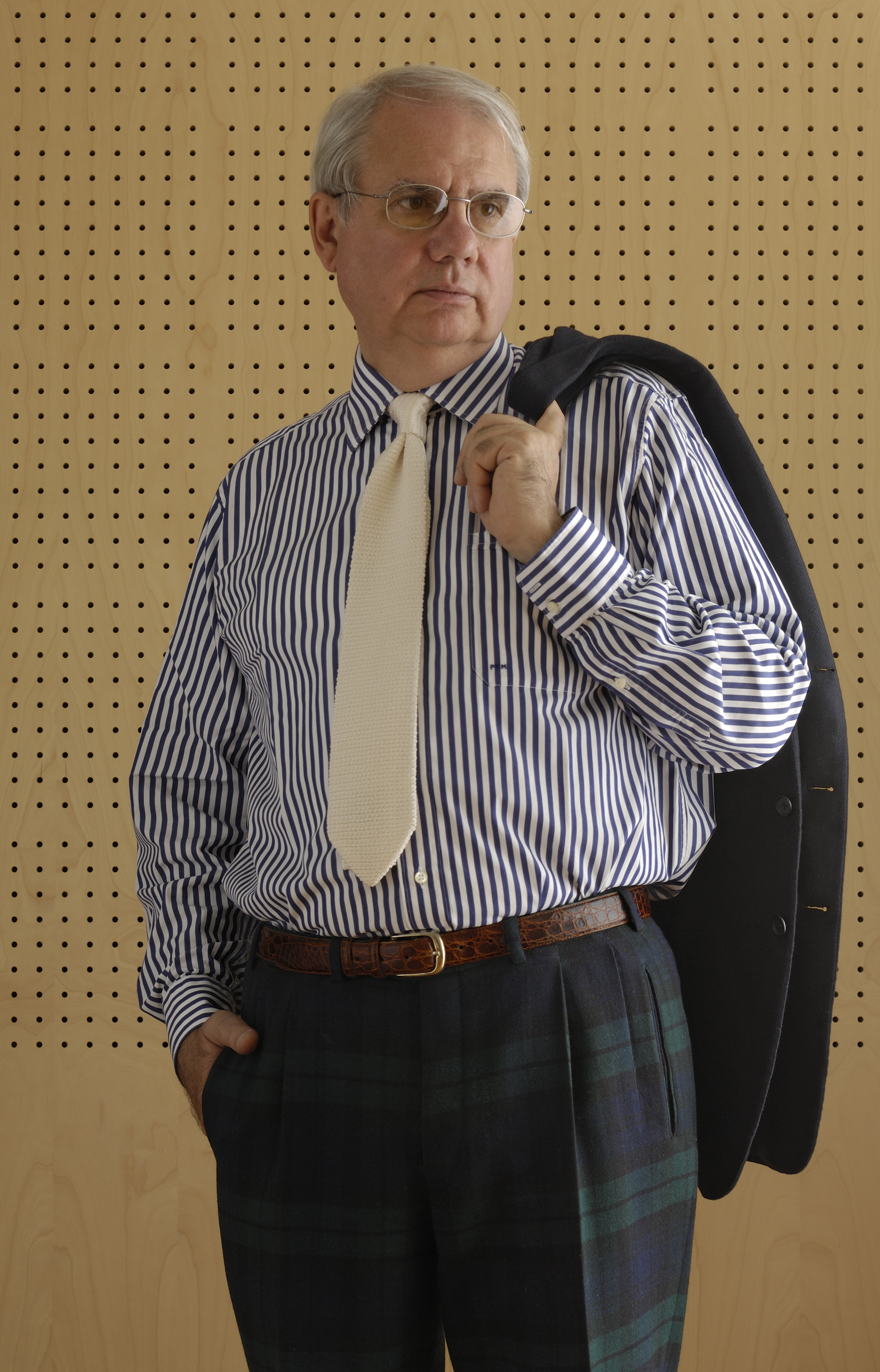
- Born: August 30, 1943 (age 83); Saluzzo, Piedmont
- Occupation: Architect
- Practice: ArchA SpA
- Projects: CityLife; Torino Esposizioni; The third city of Jinhua; Caofeidian Ecocity; Laguna Verde

Pier Paolo Maggiora is an Italian architect.

== Biography ==
He was born in 1943 in Saluzzo, Italy. In Turin he received his Master of Arts degree with Carlo Mollino. Maggiora was an apprentice in the ateliers of Frank Lloyd Wright, Le Corbusier, Alvar Aalto, Carlo Scarpa, Oscar Niemeyer and Kenzo Tange. In 1967 Pier Paolo Maggiora opened his own practice in Turin and several years later he founded the studio ArchA. In the following years, during the post-industrial and environmental and infrastructure crisis, he developed project proposals which involved starting from architecture, environmental, land and urban aspects. This led to his theory of architectural territory a concept where territory is viewed from an organic and broad perspective: culturally, socially, economically, functionally and aesthetically.

== Dialogue in Architecture ==
In the 1980s he laid the foundations for his theory of a dialogue in architecture, for the promotion of creative projects between architects while at the same time restoring the charm of unitarian diversity, which has created layers over the centuries in the historic city.

His professional activity is based on the general concept of architecture and its role in civil society, and is expressed in a big number of projects and works, where the theory is embodied in structures, masses, surfaces, and facilities.

In the convergence of stimulus and information from different disciplines (ecology, anthropology, urban planning, engineering, sociology, economics, management and finance) is defined, through his whole work, the architectural synthesis where philosophical principles are called to intertwine in forms and functions offered to the social fruition.

== Projects ==
The following are some of his latest projects:

- The Caofeidian EcoCity”, the first town of the Third Millennium, Tanghshan, China;
- the Third City of Jinhua, part of the “100 Cities Project”, which the architect, Mr Pier Paolo Maggiora, has designed as Italy's contribution to the Chinese programme to move hundreds of millions of country people into the city, China;
- “100 City Project”, Method proposal about a definition of New Urban System in the China urbanization program, in the cooperation between Italy and China Governments;
- The "Green Lagoon", the new central metropolitan area in Settimo Torinese, Turin, Italy;
- The New Tower of the Milan exhibition area Fiera di Milano in Rho, Italy;
- The “New Arcade”, financial district in Verona, Italy;
- CityLife: the “new center” of Milan, in the historical exhibition area (with Zaha Hadid, Arata Isozaki and Daniel Libeskind), Italy;
- Susa 2 complex (2004), that completes the Sitaf headquarter system which was realized beginning 1990 in Susa, Turin, Italy;
- The "Tower 18" in Brescia, Italy;
- The Turin Health Park in Turin, Italy;
- The Central Olympic Compound For the Turin 2006 Olympic Games (with Arata Isozaki), Italy;
- The “Parque Urbano” Headquarters in Buenos Aires, Argentina.

== Bibliography ==
- Pier Paolo Maggiora. Maurizio Vitta. CAYAC, X Biennale di Architettura di Buenos Aires. L’Arca Edizioni, Milano 2005.
- Progetto Ecocity Caofeidian, la prima città del terzo millennio. Pier Paolo Maggiora. Collana "I Dialoghi", Edizioni ArchA, Torino 2008.
