= Gianluigi Savoldi =

Italian footballer (1949–2008)

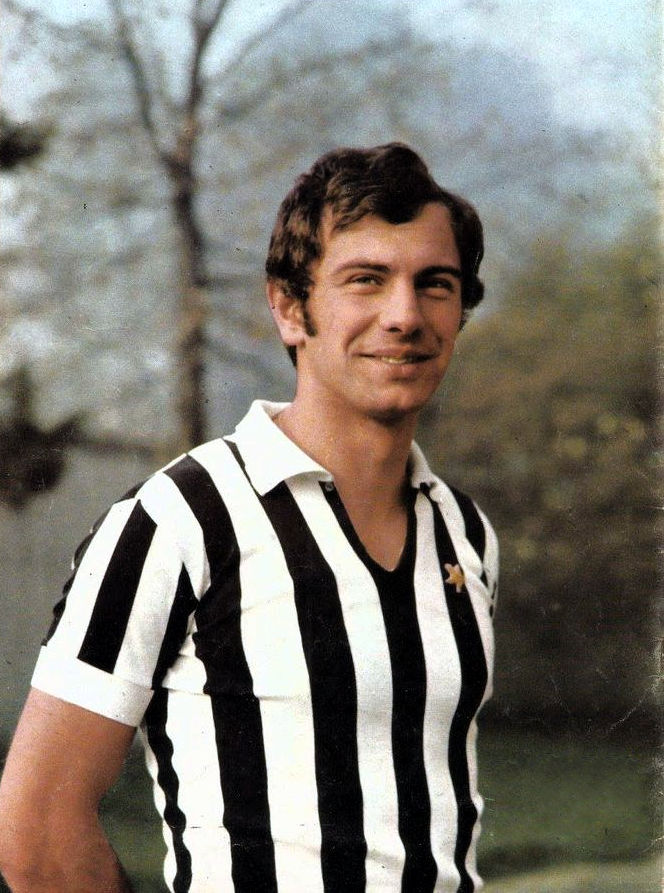
- Savoldi with Juventus in 1970

Personal information
- Date of birth: 9 June 1949
- Place of birth: Gorlago, Italy
- Date of death: 13 April 2008 (aged 58)
- Place of death: Bergamo, Italy
- Height: 1.78 m (5 ft 10 in)
- Position: Midfielder

Senior career*
Years	Team	Apps	(Gls)
1966–1967	Atalanta		
1967–1968	Trevigliese		
1968–1969	Viareggio		
1969–1970	Atalanta		
1970–1976	Juventus	32	(0)
1973–1974	→ Cesena (loan)	28	(3)
1974–1975	→ L.R. Vicenza (loan)	30	
1976–1979	Sampdoria		
1979–1980	Giulianova		
1980–1981	Livorno		
- * Club domestic league appearances and goals

Gianluigi Savoldi (9 June 1949 – 13 April 2008) was an Italian professional footballer who played as a midfielder. His older brother Giuseppe Savoldi and nephew Gianluca Savoldi (Giuseppe's son) also played football professionally.

== Honours ==
Juventus

- Serie A: 1971–72
