= Domenico Maggiora =

Italian footballer and manager (born 1955)

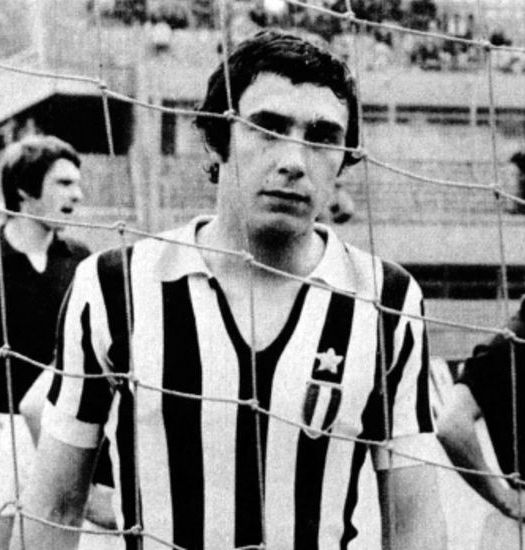
- Maggiora with Juventus in 1973

Personal information
- Date of birth: 14 January 1955 (age 71)
- Place of birth: Quattordio, Italy
- Height: 1.78 m (5 ft 10 in)
- Position: Midfielder

Senior career*
Years	Team	Apps	(Gls)
1973–1974	Juventus	0	(0)
1974–1976	Varese	50	(8)
1976–1982	Roma	126	(1)
1982–1983	Sampdoria	21	(1)
1983–1984	Cagliari	27	(0)
1984–1987	Catania	66	(0)

Managerial career
- 2006–: Juventus Under-15
- * Club domestic league appearances and goals

Domenico Maggiora (born 14 January 1955 in Quattordio) is an Italian professional football coach and former player.

A midfielder, he played eight seasons (162 games, 3 goals) in the Italian Serie A for A.S. Varese 1910, A.S. Roma and U.C. Sampdoria.

Roma fans remember him for a memorable goal he scored with a bicycle kick on 27 November 1977 in a game against Vicenza.

As he stated in a 2004 interview to Il Romanista newspaper, he always regretted leaving Roma for Sampdoria in the summer of 1982 as he missed on winning the Serie A title with Roma in the 1982–83 season after playing for them for 6 years.

He was for some years a youth coach at Juventus.

== Honours ==
Roma

- Coppa Italia winner: 1979–80, 1980–81
