= 1971–72 Juventus FC season =

Italian football club season

Juventus Football Club
1971-72 season
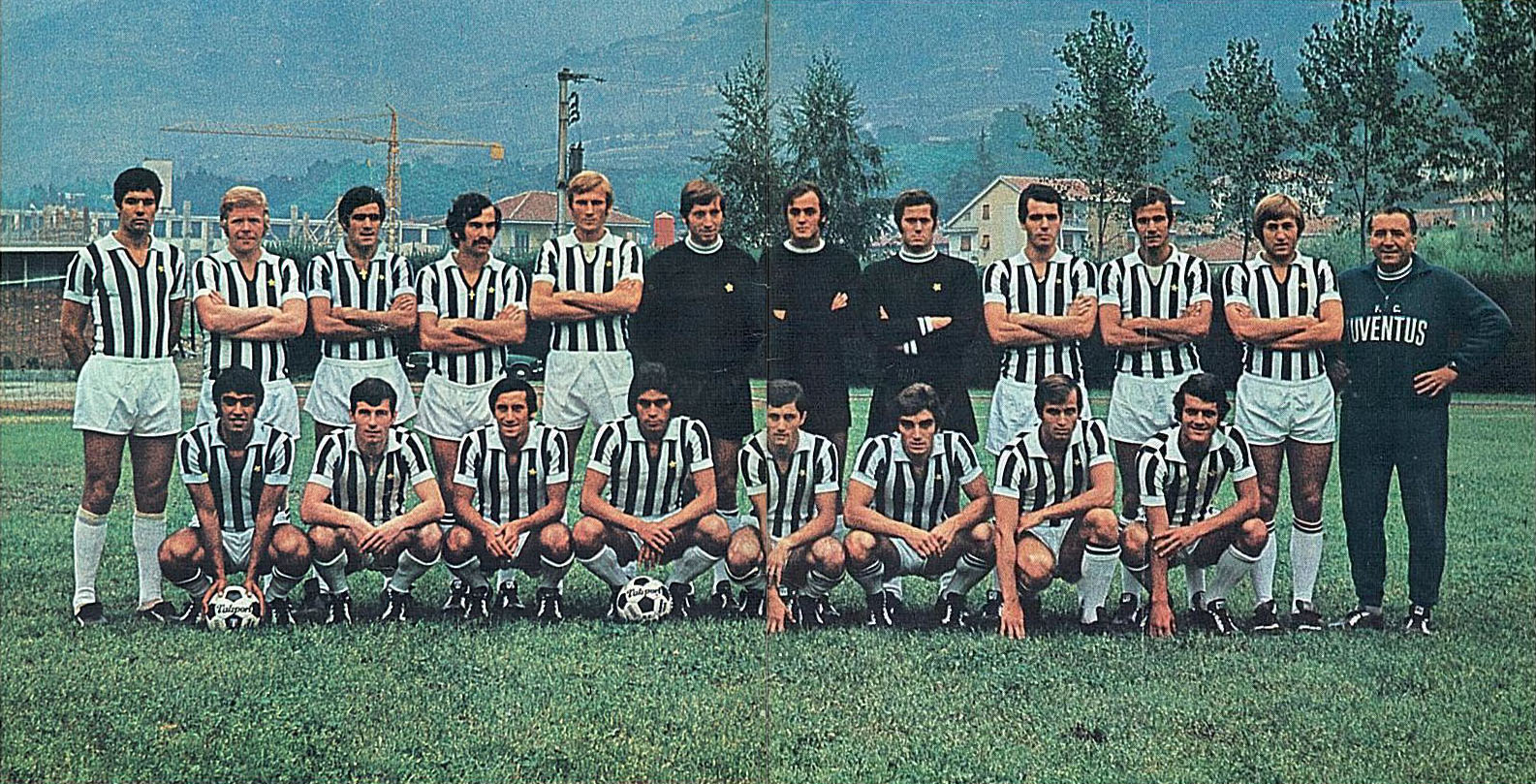
- Owner: Agnelli family
- President: Giampiero Boniperti
- Manager: Čestmír Vycpálek
- Stadium: Comunale
- Serie A: 1º (in European Cup)
- Coppa Italia: Second round
- UEFA Cup: Quarterfinals
- Top goalscorer: League: Anastasi (11); All: Anastasi (18)
- Average home league attendance: 45,667
Home colours	Away colours

During 1971-72 season Juventus competed in Serie A, Coppa Italia and UEFA Cup.

== Summary ==
Juventus won the domestic league after 5 years, being its 14th league in their history this time with Cestmir Vycpalek as manager.

== Squad ==
Note: Flags indicate national team as defined under FIFA eligibility rules; some limited exceptions apply. Players may hold more than one non-FIFA nationality.

Pos.	Nation	Player
GK	ITA	Pietro Carmignani
GK	ITA	Massimo Piloni
DF	ITA	Vincenzo Chiarenza
DF	ITA	Silvio Longobucco
DF	ITA	Francesco Morini
DF	ITA	Gianluigi Roveta
DF	ITA	Sandro Salvadore
DF	ITA	Luciano Spinosi
MF	ITA	Fabio Capello
MF	ITA	Franco Causio

Pos.	Nation	Player
MF	ITA	Antonello Cuccureddu
MF	ITA	Giuseppe Furino
MF	FRG	Helmut Haller
MF	ITA	Gianpietro Marchetti
MF	ITA	Adriano Novellini
MF	ITA	Gianluigi Savoldi
MF	ITA	Fernando Viola
FW	ITA	Pietro Anastasi
FW	ITA	Roberto Bettega

=== Transfers ===
In
Pos.	Name	from	Type
GK	Pietro Carmignani	Varese	
DF	Silvio Longobucco	Ternana	
MF	Fernando Viola		

Out
Pos.	Name	to	Type
GK	Roberto Tancredi	Mantova	
FW	Fausto Landini	Bologna FC	
DF	Giuseppe Zaniboni	Mantova	

== Competitions ==
=== Serie A ===
==== League table ====
Pos	Team	Pld	W	D	L	GF	GA	GD	Pts	Qualification or relegation
1	Juventus (C)	30	17	9	4	48	24	+24	43	Qualification to European Cup
2	Milan	30	16	10	4	36	17	+19	42	Qualification to Cup Winners' Cup
3	Torino	30	17	8	5	39	25	+14	42	Qualification to UEFA Cup
4	Cagliari	30	15	9	6	39	23	+16	39	Qualification to UEFA Cup
5	Internazionale	30	13	10	7	49	28	+21	36	Qualification to UEFA Cup

Source: Panini
(C) Champions

==== Results by round ====
Round	1	2	3	4	5	6	7	8	9	10	11	12	13	14	15	16	17	18	19	20	21	22	23	24	25	26	27	28	29	30
Ground	H	A	H	A	H	A	H	H	A	H	H	A	A	H	A	A	H	A	H	A	H	A	H	H	A	A	H	H	A	H
Result	W	L	W	W	W	W	D	W	W	W	W	D	L	W	W	L	W	D	D	D	W	D	L	W	D	D	W	W	D	W
Position	1	5	4	2	2	1	1	1	1	1	1	1	1	1	1	1	1	1	1	1	1	1	1	1	1	2	1	1	1	1

Source: Competitive matches
A = Away; H = Home; W = Win; D = Draw; L = Loss; P = Postponed; = Leader, qualified to 1972–73 European Cup; = 1972–73 UEFA Cup; = Relegation to 1972–73 Serie B

==== Matches ====
3 October 1971 1	Juventus	4–2	Catanzaro	Turin
	Anastasi 34'; Haller 64'; Bettega 66', 76'	Report	75' Spelta; 79' M. Gori	Stadium: Comunale; Referee: Cesare Trinchieri

17 October 1971 2	Hellas Verona	1–0	Juventus	Verona
	Orazi 50'	Report		Stadium: Stadio Marcantonio Bentegodi; Referee: Torelli

24 October 1971 3	Juventus	1–0	Atalanta	Turin
	Haller 27'	Report		Stadium: Comunale; Referee: Michelotti

31 October 1971 4	Milan	1–4	Juventus	Milan
	Bigon 58'	Report	16', 28' Bettega; 39' Causio; 88' Anastasi	Stadium: San Siro; Referee: Francescon

7 November 1971 5	Juventus	2–1	Roma	Turin
	Capello 71', 76'	Report	27' Amarildo	Stadium: Comunale; Referee: Lo Bello

14 November 1971 6	Bologna	1–2	Juventus	Bologna
	Savoldi I 45'	Report	18' Bettega; 26' Capello	Stadium: Comunale; Referee: Monti

28 November 1971 7	Juventus	2–2	Napoli	Turin
	Capello 23'; Bettega 69'	Report	17' Altafini; 66' (pen.) Improta	Stadium: Comunale; Referee: Paolo Toselli

5 December 1971 8	Juventus	2–1	Torino	Turin
	Anastasi 32'; Capello 63'	Report	35' Ferrini	Stadium: Comunale; Referee: Angonese

12 December 1971 9	Varese	0–1	Juventus	Varese
		Report	21' Causio	Stadium: Stadio Franco Ossola; Referee: Lo Bello

19 December 1971 10	Juventus	3–1	Sampdoria	Turin
	Bettega 10', 64'; Haller 41'	Report	4' (o.g.) Spinosi	Stadium: Comunale; Referee: Giunti

26 December 1971 11	Juventus	2–1	Mantova	Turin
	Anastasi 65', 70'	Report	81' Nuti	Stadium: Comunale; Referee: Bernardis

2 January 1972 12	Inter	0–0	Juventus	Milan
		Report		Stadium: Stadio San Siro; Referee: Lo Bello

9 January 1972 13	Cagliari	2–1	Juventus	Cagliari
	Domenghini 26'; S. Gori 90'	Report	85' Bettega	Stadium: Stadio Sant'Elia; Referee: Aurelio Angonese

16 January 1972 14	Juventus	1–0	Fiorentina	Turin
	Bettega 73'	Report		Stadium: Comunale; Referee: Francescon

23 January 1972 15	Lanerossi	1–3	Juventus	Vicenza
	Maraschi 45'	Report	1' Causio; 4' Capello; 71' Anastasi	Stadium: Stadio Romeo Menti; Referee: Giunti

30 January 1972 16	Catanzaro	1–0	Juventus	Catanzaro
	Mammì 84'	Report		Stadium: Stadio Comunale; Referee: Toselli

6 February 1972 17	Juventus	4–0	Hellas Verona	Turin
	Novellini 21'; Anastasi 34'; Capello 54', 83'	Report		Stadium: Comunale; Referee: Menegali

13 February 1972 18	Atalanta	0–0	Juventus	Bergamo
		Report		Stadium: Comunale; Referee: Barbaresco

20 February 1972 19	Juventus	1–1	Milan	Turin
	Salvadore 78'	Report	32' Bigon	Stadium: Comunale; Referee: Lo Bello

27 February 1972 20	Roma	1–1	Juventus	Rome
	Petrelli 15'	Report	66' Furino	Stadium: Stadio Olimpico; Referee: Michelotti

12 March 1972 21	Juventus	2–1	Bologna	Turin
	Anastasi 71'; Marchetti 72'	Report	25' Perani	Stadium: Comunale; Referee: Francescon

19 March 1972 22	Napoli	1–1	Juventus	Naples
	Pogliana 69'	Report	10' Capello	Stadium: Stadio San Paolo; Referee: Bernardis

26 March 1972 23	Torino	2–1	Juventus	Turin
	Sala 30'; Agroppi 64'	Report	20' Anastasi	Stadium: Comunale; Referee: Angonese

2 April 1972 24	Juventus	1–0	Varese	Turin
	Haller 41'	Report		Stadium: Stadio Comunale; Referee: Michelotti

9 April 1972 25	Sampdoria	0–0	Juventus	Genoa
		Report		Stadium: Stadio Luigi Ferraris; Referee: Paolo Toselli

16 April 1972 26	Mantova	1–1	Juventus	Mantua
	Dell'Angelo 32'	Report	50' Anastasi	Stadium: Stadio Danilo Martelli; Referee: Monti

23 April 1972 27	Juventus	3–0	Inter	Turin
	Causio 7', 27', 85'	Report		Stadium: Comunale; Referee: Pieroni

7 May 1972 28	Juventus	2–1	Cagliari	Turin
	Furino 28'; Anastasi 73'	Report	61' S. Gori	Stadium: Comunale; Referee: Toselli

21 May 1972 29	Fiorentina	1–1	Juventus	Florence
	Merlo 33'	Report	52' (o.g.) Ferrante	Stadium: Comunale; Referee: Pieroni

28 May 1972 30	Juventus	2–0	Lanerossi	Turin
	Haller 26'; Spinosi 30'	Report		Stadium: Comunale; Referee: Monti

=== Coppa Italia ===
==== First round ====
Pos	Team	Pld	W	D	L	GF	GA	GD	Pts
1	Juventus	4	2	2	0	10	5	+5	6
2	Sampdoria	4	2	1	1	4	4	0	5
3	Genoa	4	0	4	0	5	5	0	4
4	Bari	4	0	3	1	2	3	−1	3
5	Taranto	4	0	2	2	2	6	−4	2

29 August 1971 1	Bari	1–1	Juventus	Taranto
	Colautti 3'		43' (pen.) Causio	Stadium: Stadio Salinella; Referee: Panzino

5 September 1971 2	Juventus	3–1	Sampdoria	Turin
	Capello 21'; Marchetti 42'; Anastasi 82'		69' Suárez Miramontes	Stadium: Stadio Comunale; Referee: Barbaresco

12 September 1971 3	Genoa	2–2	Juventus	Genoa
	Turone 40' (pen.); Corradi 59'		15' Spinosi; 80' Capello	Stadium: Stadio Luigi Ferraris; Referee: Lo Bello

19 September 1971 4	Juventus	4–1	Taranto	Turin
	Furino 2'; Anastasi 28'; Causio 68'; Bettega 81'		23' Beretti	Stadium: Stadio Comunale; Referee: Cantelli

==== Second round ====
Pos	Team	Pld	W	D	L	GF	GA	GD	Pts	ACM	TOR	INT	JUV
1	Milan	6	4	2	0	7	3	+4	10	—	1–1	1–0	3–2
2	Torino	6	2	2	2	5	7	−2	6	0–0	—	1–0	2–1
3	Internazionale	6	2	0	4	7	6	+1	4	0–1	3–0	—	3–1
4	Juventus	6	2	0	4	8	11	−3	4	0–1	2–1	2–1	—

Source: historical-lineups.com

4 June 1972 1	Inter Milan	3–1	Juventus	Milan
	Boninsegna 16', 90'; Mazzola I 75'		2' Anastasi	Stadium: Stadio San Siro; Referee: Giunti

8 June 1972 2	Juventus	2–1	Torino	Turin
	Furino 18'; Anastasi 88'		67' Ferrini	Stadium: Stadio Comunale; Referee: Torelli

11 June 1972 3	Juventus	0–1	Milan	Turin
			27' Prati	Stadium: Stadio Comunale; Referee: Toselli

25 June 1972 4	Juventus	2–1	Inter Milan	Turin
	Novellini 47', 81'		88' Jair	Stadium: Stadio Comunale; Referee: Barbaresco

28 June 1972 5	Torino	2–1	Juventus	Turin
	Bui 84'; Toschi 88'		86' Capello	Stadium: Stadio Comunale; Referee: Francescon

1 July 1972 6	Milan	3–2	Juventus	Milan
	Rivera 13' (pen.), 73'; Piloni 18' (o.g.)		34' Novellini; 44' Haller	Stadium: Stadio San Siro; Referee: Giunti

=== UEFA Cup ===
==== First round ====
15 September 1971	Marsa (Malta)	0–6	(Italy) Juventus	La Valletta
			32', 60' Haller; 54' Causio; 63' Novellini; 69' Capello; 88' Cuccureddu	Stadium: Gzira Stadium; Referee: (Scotland) Paterson

28 September 1971 Ritorno	Juventus (Italy)	5–0	(Malta) Marsa	Turin
	Novellini 18', 32', 90'; Haller 45'; Furino 63'			Stadium: Comunale; Referee: (Luxembourg) Colling

==== Round of 32 ====
27 October 1971 1	Juventus (Italy)	2–0	(Scotland) Aberdeen F.C.	Turin
	Anastasi 5'; Murray 55' (o.g.)			Stadium: Comunale; Referee: (Bulgaria) Nikolov

17 November 1971 2	Aberdeen F.C. (Scotland)	1–1	(Italy) Juventus	Aberdeen
	Harper 78'		50' Anastasi	Stadium: Pittodrie Stadium; Referee: (Netherlands) Boosten

==== Eightfinals ====
24 November 1971	Rapid Wien (Austria)	0–1	(Italy) Juventus	Wien
			30' Bettega	Stadium: Praterstadion; Referee: (West Germany) Biwersi

8 December 1971	Juventus (Italy)	4–1	(Austria) Rapid Wien	Turin
	Bettega 8', 46', 71'; Causio 81' (pen.)		16' Lorenz	Stadium: Comunale; Referee: (East Germany) Manning

==== Quarterfinals ====
7 March 1972	Juventus (Italy)	1–1	(England) Wolverhampton Wanderers	Turin
	Anastasi 37'		66' McCalliog	Stadium: Comunale; Referee: (Belgium) Loraux

22 March 1972	Wolverhampton Wanderers (England)	2–1	(Italy) Juventus	Wolverhampton
	Hegan 40'; Dougan 52'		84' (pen.) Haller	Stadium: Molineux Stadium; Referee: (France) Kitabdjan

== Statistics ==
=== Players statistics ===
No.	Pos	Nat	Player	Total		Serie A		Coppa		UEFA	
No.	Pos	Nat	Player	Apps	Goals	Apps	Goals	Apps	Goals	Apps	Goals
	GK	(Italy) ITA	Carmignani	37	-30	25	-21	5	-6	7	-3
	DF	(Italy) ITA	Marchetti	47	2	29	1	10	1	8	0
	DF	(Italy) ITA	Morini	45	0	30	0	9	0	6	0
	DF	(Italy) ITA	Salvadore	45	1	30	1	8	0	7	0
	DF	(Italy) ITA	Spinosi	47	2	30	1	9	1	8	0
	MF	(Italy) ITA	Causio	45	10	30	6	9	2	6	2
	MF	(Italy) ITA	Furino	41	5	27	2	7	2	7	1
	MF	(Italy) ITA	Capello	45	13	29	9	9	3	7	1
	MF	(West Germany) FRG	Haller	39	10	23	5	9	1	7	4
	FW	(Italy) ITA	Anastasi	44	18	30	11	8	4	6	3
	FW	(Italy) ITA	Bettega	23	15	14	10	4	1	5	4
	GK	(Italy) ITA	Piloni	13	-15	5	-3	6	-10	2	-2
	FW	(Italy) ITA	Novellini	23	8	9+2	1	8	3	4	4
	DF	(Italy) ITA	Cuccureddu	23	1	8+2	0	9	0	4	1
	MF	(Italy) ITA	Savoldi	22	0	6+7	0	5	0	4	0
	MF	(Italy) ITA	Viola	9	0	3+1	0	2	0	3	0
	DF	(Italy) ITA	Longobucco	6	0	2	0	2	0	2	0
	DF	(Italy) ITA	Roveta	13	0	0+1	0	7	0	5	0
	DF	(Italy) ITA	Chiarenza	1	0	0	0	1	0		
	GK	(Italy) ITA	Alessandrelli	0	0	0	0				

- Source: http://calcio-seriea.net/presenze/1971/696/
