= 1971 Inter-Cities Fairs Cup final =

- Event: 1970–71 Inter-Cities Fairs Cup
Juventus	Leeds United
(Italy)	(England)
3	3
- on aggregate Leeds United won on away goals

First leg
Juventus	Leeds United
2	2
- Date: 28 May 1971
- Venue: Stadio Comunale, Turin
- Referee: Laurens van Ravens (Netherlands)
- Attendance: 58,555

Second leg
Leeds United	Juventus
1	1
- Date: 3 June 1971
- Venue: Elland Road, Leeds
- Referee: Rudi Glöckner (East Germany)
- Attendance: 42,483

The 1971 Inter-Cities Fairs Cup final was the final of the thirteenth and last Inter-Cities Fairs Cup. It was played on 28 May and 3 June 1971 between Juventus of Italy and Leeds United of England. Leeds won the tie 3–3 on away goals.

The game that was originally scheduled to be the first leg game, on 26 May, was abandoned after 51 minutes of play with a score of 0–0 due to heavy rain and waterlogged pitch.

== Route to the final ==
Juventus				Round	Leeds United			
Opponent	Agg.	1st leg	2nd leg		Opponent	Agg.	1st leg	2nd leg
(Luxembourg) Rumelange	11–0	7–0 (H)	4–0 (A)	First round	(Norway) Sarpsborg FK	6–0	1–0 (A)	5–0 (H)
(Spain) Barcelona	4–2	2–1 (A)	2–1 (H)	Second round	(East Germany) Dynamo Dresden	2–2 (a)	1–0 (H)	1–2 (A)
(Hungary) Pécsi MFC	3–0	1–0 (A)	2–0 (H)	Third round	(Czechoslovakia) Sparta Prague	9–2	6–0 (H)	3–2 (A)
(Netherlands) Twente	4–2	2–0 (H)	2–2 (a.e.t.) (A)	Quarter-finals	(Portugal) Vitória de Setúbal	3–2	2–1 (H)	1–1 (A)
(West Germany) 1. FC Köln	3–1	1–1 (A)	2–0 (H)	Semi-finals	(England) Liverpool	1–0	1–0 (A)	0–0 (H)

== Match details ==
=== First leg ===
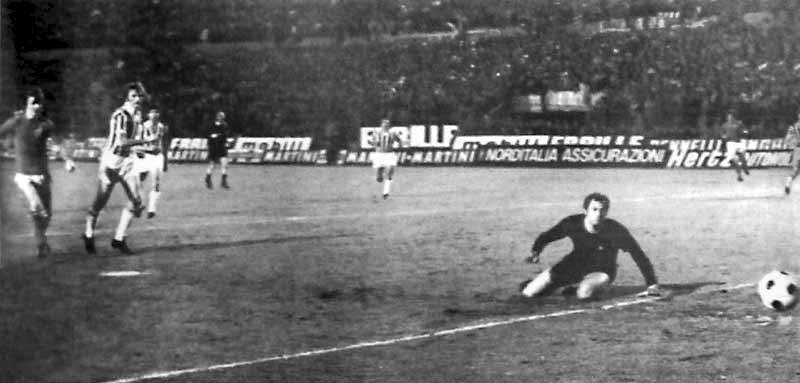
A moment of the match held in Stadio Comunale

28 May 1971
21:00 CEST
First leg

Juventus (Italy)	2–2	(England) Leeds United
Bettega 27'; Capello 55'		Madeley 48'; Bates 77'

Stadio Comunale, Turin
Attendance: 58,555
Referee: (Netherlands) Laurens van Ravens

Juventus

Leeds United

GK	1	(Italy) Massimo Piloni
DF	2	(Italy) Luciano Spinosi
DF	3	(Italy) Gianpietro Marchetti
MF	4	(Italy) Giuseppe Furino
DF	5	(Italy) Francesco Morini
DF	6	(Italy) Sandro Salvadore (c)
MF	7	(Italy) Franco Causio
MF	8	(Italy) Fabio Capello
FW	9	(Italy) Pietro Anastasi	(substituted off) 72'
MF	10	(West Germany) Helmut Haller
FW	11	(Italy) Roberto Bettega
Substitutes:
FW	12	(Italy) Adriano Novellini	(substituted on) 72'
Manager:
(Czechoslovakia) Čestmír Vycpálek

Leeds United
GK	1	(Wales) Gary Sprake
DF	2	(England) Paul Reaney
DF	3	(England) Terry Cooper
MF	4	(Scotland) Billy Bremner (c)
DF	5	(England) Jack Charlton
DF	6	(England) Norman Hunter
MF	7	(Scotland) Peter Lorimer
FW	8	(England) Allan Clarke	(yellow card) 31'
FW	9	(England) Mick Jones		(substituted off) 72'
MF	10	(Republic of Ireland) Johnny Giles
MF	11	(England) Paul Madeley
Substitutes:
MF	12	(England) Mick Bates		(substituted on) 72'
Manager:
(England) Don Revie

=== Second leg ===
3 June 1971
19:30 CEST
Second leg

Leeds United (England)	1–1	(Italy) Juventus
Clarke 12'		Anastasi 20'

Elland Road, Leeds
Attendance: 42,483
Referee: (East Germany) Rudi Glöckner

Leeds United

Juventus

GK	1	(Wales) Gary Sprake
DF	2	(England) Paul Reaney
DF	3	(England) Terry Cooper
MF	4	(Scotland) Billy Bremner (c)
DF	5	(England) Jack Charlton
DF	6	(England) Norman Hunter
MF	7	(Scotland) Peter Lorimer
FW	8	(England) Allan Clarke
FW	9	(England) Mick Jones
MF	10	(Republic of Ireland) Johnny Giles
MF	11	(England) Paul Madeley	(substituted off) 57'
Substitutes:
MF	12	(England) Mick Bates	(substituted on) 57'
Manager:
(England) Don Revie

GK	1	(Italy) Roberto Tancredi
DF	2	(Italy) Luciano Spinosi
DF	3	(Italy) Gianpietro Marchetti
MF	4	(Italy) Giuseppe Furino
DF	5	(Italy) Francesco Morini	(yellow card) 75'
DF	6	(Italy) Sandro Salvadore (c)
MF	7	(Italy) Franco Causio
MF	8	(Italy) Fabio Capello
FW	9	(Italy) Pietro Anastasi
MF	10	(West Germany) Helmut Haller
FW	11	(Italy) Roberto Bettega
Manager:
(Czechoslovakia) Čestmír Vycpálek

Leeds United won 3–3 on away goals

== See also ==
- 1970–71 Inter-Cities Fairs Cup
- Juventus F.C. in European football
- Leeds United F.C. in European football
