= 1974–75 Juventus FC season =

Italian football club season

Juventus Football Club
1974–75 season
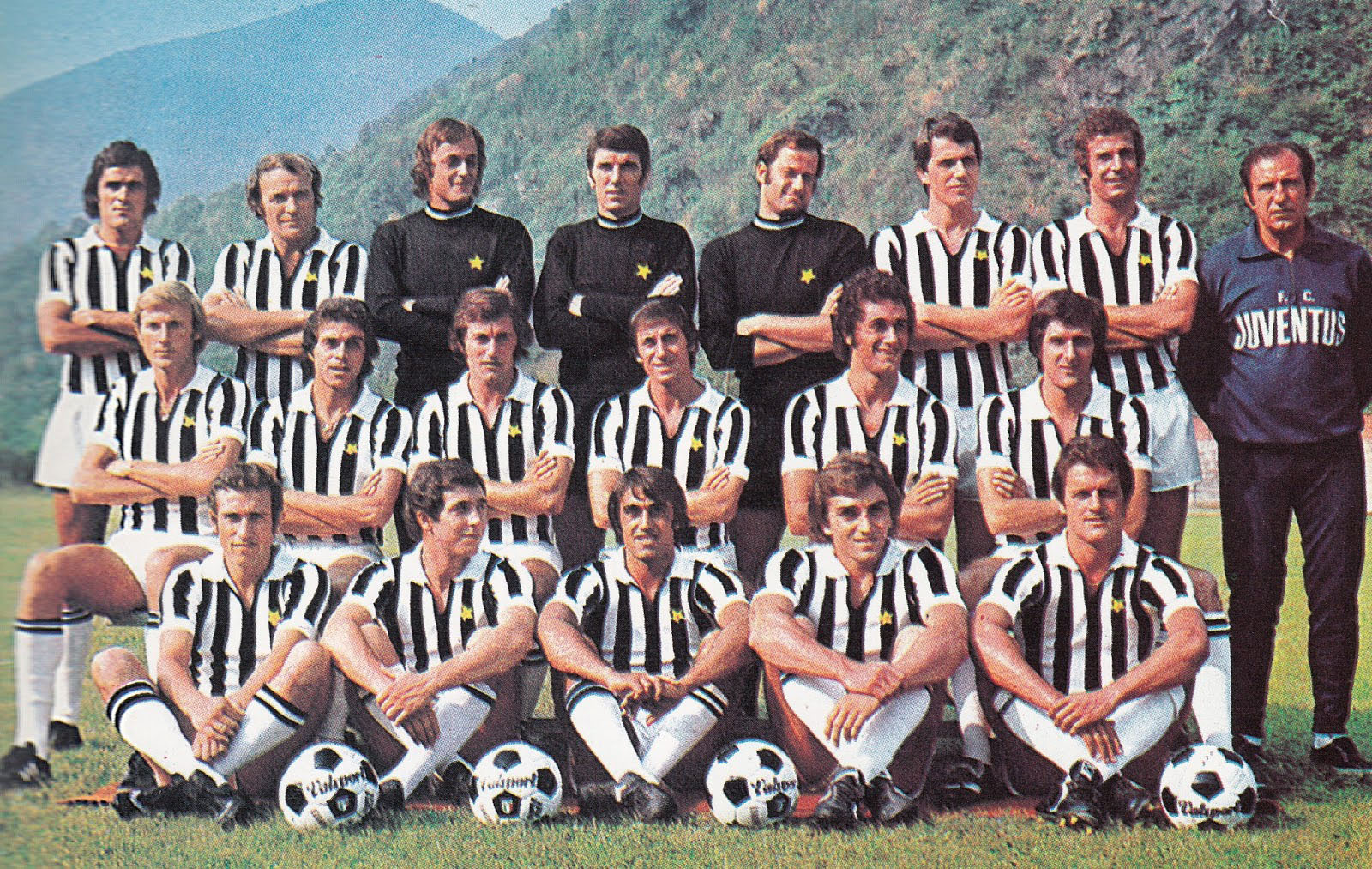
- Chairman: Giampiero Boniperti
- Manager: Carlo Parola
- Stadium: Comunale
- Serie A: 1st (in European Cup)
- Coppa Italia: Second round
- UEFA Cup: Semifinals
- Top goalscorer: League: Damiani (9); All: Pietro Anastasi (21)
- Average home league attendance: 41,820
Home colours	Away colours

During 1974–75 season Juventus competed in Serie A, Coppa Italia and UEFA Cup.

== Summary ==
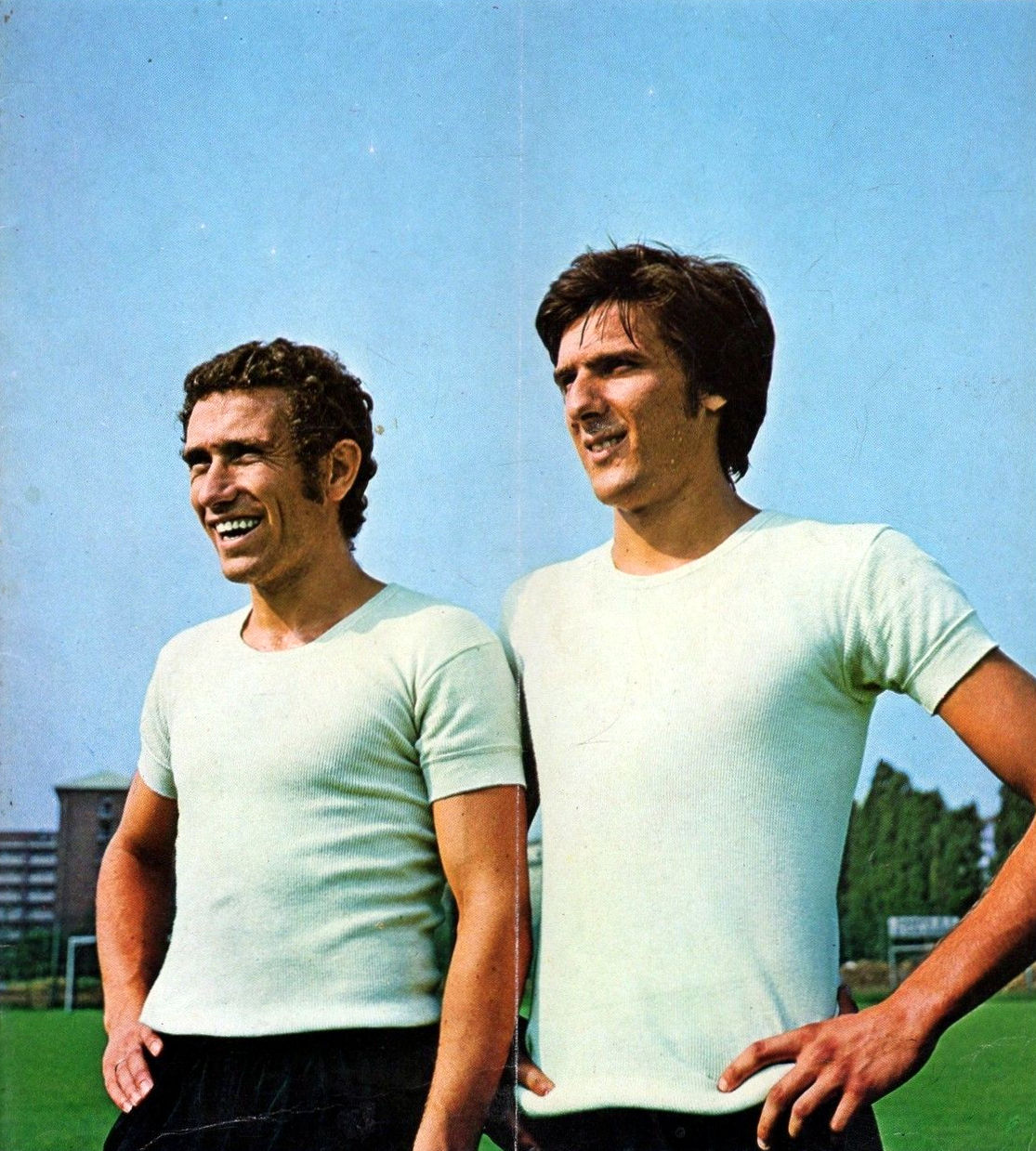
From left to right: the two new season's arrivals, winger Oscar Damiani and sweeper Gaetano Scirea.

Carlo Parola returned to the team after 12 years along with new arrivals Damiani and Scirea. Anastasi became the new captain after the retirement of Sandro Salvadore. A reinforced Juventus clinched its 16th league against runners-up Napoli.

== Squad ==
Note: Flags indicate national team as defined under FIFA eligibility rules; some limited exceptions apply. Players may hold more than one non-FIFA nationality.

Pos.	Nation	Player
GK	ITA	Giancarlo Alessandrelli
GK	ITA	Massimo Piloni
GK	ITA	Dino Zoff
DF	ITA	Antonello Cuccureddu
DF	ITA	Claudio Gentile
DF	ITA	Silvio Longobucco
DF	ITA	Francesco Morini
DF	ITA	Gaetano Scirea
DF	ITA	Luciano Spinosi
MF	ITA	Franco Causio

Pos.	Nation	Player
MF	ITA	Fabio Capello
MF	ITA	Giuseppe Damiani
MF	ITA	Giuseppe Furino
MF	ITA	Alberto Marchetti
MF	ITA	Fernando Viola
FW	BRA	José Altafini
FW	ITA	Pietro Anastasi (captain)
FW	ITA	Roberto Bettega
FW	ITA	Paolo Rossi

=== Transfers ===
In
Pos.	Name	from	Type
DF	Gaetano Scirea	Atalanta BC	
MF	Oscar Damiani	LR Vicenza	

Out
Pos.	Name	To	Type
DF	Sandro Salvadore		retired
MF	Gianpietro Marchetti	Atalanta BC	

== Competitions ==
=== Serie A ===
==== League table ====
Pos	Team	Pld	W	D	L	GF	GA	GD	Pts	Qualification or relegation
1	Juventus (C)	30	18	7	5	49	19	+30	43	Qualification to European Cup
2	Napoli	30	14	13	3	50	22	+28	41	Qualification to UEFA Cup
3	Roma	30	15	9	6	27	15	+12	39	Qualification to UEFA Cup
4	Lazio	30	14	9	7	34	28	+6	37	Qualification to UEFA Cup
5	Milan	30	12	12	6	37	22	+15	36	Qualification to UEFA Cup

Source: Panini
(C) Champions

==== Results by round ====
Round	1	2	3	4	5	6	7	8	9	10	11	12	13	14	15	16	17	18	19	20	21	22	23	24	25	26	27	28	29	30
Ground	H	A	H	A	H	A	H	A	H	A	A	H	H	A	H	A	H	A	H	A	H	A	H	A	H	H	A	A	H	A
Result	L	W	D	W	W	W	W	W	D	W	W	L	W	D	W	D	W	W	D	D	W	L	W	L	W	D	W	W	L	W
Position	11	6	6	4	1	1	1	1	1	1	1	1	1	1	1	1	1	1	1	1	1	1	1	1	1	1	1	1	1	1

Source: Competitive matches
A = Away; H = Home; W = Win; D = Draw; L = Loss; P = Postponed; = Leader, 1975–76 European Cup; = 1975–76 UEFA Cup; = 1975-76 Serie B

==== Matches ====
6 October 1974 1	Bologna	2–1	Juventus	Bologna
	G. Savoldi 21'; Cresci 72'	Report	22' Anastasi	Stadium: Comunale; Referee: R. Lattanzi

13 October 1974 2	Juventus	2–1	Milan	Turin
	Bettega 20'; Anastasi 57'	Report	32' Benetti	Stadium: Comunale; Referee: Gialluisi

20 October 1974 3	Varese	0–0	Juventus	Varese
		Report		Stadium: Stadio Franco Ossola; Referee: Barbaresco

27 October 1974 4	Juventus	4–0	Ascoli	Turin
	Altafini 30', 45'; Anastasi 68'; Causio 83'	Report		Stadium: Comunale; Referee: Gussoni

3 November 1974 5	Sampdoria	1–3	Juventus	Genoa
	De Giorgis 46'	Report	66', 73' Altafini; 74' Anastasi	Stadium: Stadio Luigi Ferraris; Referee: Ciacci

10 November 1974 6	Cesena	0–1	Juventus	Cesena
		Report	85' Causio	Stadium: La Fiorita; Referee: Menicucci

24 November 1974 7	Juventus	1–0	Roma	Turin
	Damiani 56' (pen.)	Report		Stadium: Comunale; Referee: Trinchieri

1 December 1974 8	Inter	0–1	Juventus	Milan
		Report	72' Capello	Stadium: San Siro; Referee: Ciacci

8 December 1974 9	Juventus	0–0	Torino	Turin
		Report		Stadium: Comunale; Referee: Menicucci

15 December 1974 10	Napoli	2–6	Juventus	Naples
	Clerici 62', 73'	Report	27' Altafini; 37' (pen.), 41' Damiani; 51' Bettega; 70' Causio; 84' Viola	Stadium: San Paolo; Referee: Agnolin

22 December 1974 11	Juventus	1–0	Cagliari	Turin
	Causio 89'	Report		Stadium: Comunale; Referee: Ciulli

5 January 1975 12	Lazio	1–0	Juventus	Rome
	Scirea 42' (o.g.)	Report		Stadium: Stadio Olimpico; Referee: Michelotti

12 January 1975 13	Juventus	2–0	Ternana	Turin
	Damiani 33' (pen.); Causio 80'	Report		Stadium: Comunale; Referee: Prati

19 January 1975 14	Juventus	0–0	Fiorentina	Turin
		Report		Stadium: Comunale; Referee: Serafino

26 January 1975 15	Lanerossi	1–2	Juventus	Vicenza
	G.L. Savoldi 72'	Report	41' Bettega; 53' Capello	Stadium: Stadio Romeo Menti; Referee: Menegali

2 February 1975 16	Juventus	0–0	Bologna	Turin
		Report		Stadium: Comunale; Referee: Casarin

9 February 1975 17	Milan	0–2	Juventus	Milan
	Bigon 20'	Report	63' Bettega; 70' (pen.) Damiani	Stadium: Stadio San Siro; Referee: Barbaresco

16 February 1975 18	Juventus	3–0	Varese	Turin
	Damiani 29' (pen.); Anastasi 75'; Borghi 83' (o.g.)	Report		Stadium: Comunale; Referee: Panzino

23 February 1975 19	Ascoli	0–0	Juventus	Ascoli Piceno
		Report		Stadium: Stadio Cino e Lillo Del Duca; Referee: Michelotti

2 March 1975 20	Juventus	1–1	Sampdoria	Turin
	Damiani 31'	Report	19' (o.g.) Gentile	Stadium: Comunale; Referee: Gialluisi

9 March 1975 21	Juventus	1–0	Cesena	Turin
	Damiani 39' (pen.)	Report		Stadium: Comunale; Referee: Picasso

16 March 1975 22	Roma	1–0	Juventus	Rome
	F. Morini 72' (o.g.)	Report		Stadium: Stadio Olimpico; Referee: Casarin

23 March 1975 23	Juventus	1–0	Inter	Turin
	Cuccureddu 39'	Report		Stadium: Comunale; Referee: Menicucci

30 March 1975 24	Torino	3–2	Juventus	Turin
	P. Pulici 19' (pen.), 71'; Zaccarelli 88'	Report	34' Bettega; 83' Capello	Stadium: Comunale; Referee: Ciacci

6 April 1975 25	Juventus	2–1	Napoli	Turin
	Causio 19'; Altafini 88'	Report	59' Juliano	Stadium: Comunale; Referee: Michelotti

13 April 1975 26	Cagliari	1–1	Juventus	Cagliari
	Morini 5' (o.g.)	Report	87' Altafini	Stadium: Stadio Sant'Elia; Referee: Menegali

27 April 1975 27	Juventus	4–0	Lazio	Turin
	Altafini 10'; Anastasi 83', 87', 88'	Report		Stadium: Comunale; Referee: Casarin

4 May 1975 28	Ternana	0–2	Juventus	Terni
		Report	33' Bettega; 63' Causio	Stadium: Stadio Libero Liberati; Referee: Gussoni

11 May 1975 29	Fiorentina	4–1	Juventus	Florence
	Zoff 34' (o.g.); Antognoni 39'; Casarsa 73' (pen.); Caso 78'	Report	61' (o.g.) Rossi	Stadium: Comunale; Referee: Agnolin

18 May 1975 30	Juventus	5–0	Lanerossi	Turin
	Damiani 8', 38'; Bettega 27'; Anastasi 36'; Cuccureddu 55'	Report		Stadium: Comunale; Referee: Michelotti

=== Coppa Italia ===
==== First round ====
28 August 1974 1	Juventus	4–0	Varese	Turin
	Anastasi 7'; Damiani 39', 57'; Bettega 59'			Stadium: Comunale; Referee: Prati

1 September 1974 2	Reggiana	0–2	Juventus	Reggio Emilia
			69' Capello; 79' Anastasi	Stadium: Stadio Mirabello; Referee: Barbaresco

8 September 1974 3	Juventus	4–1	Taranto	Turin
	Damiani 10', 36'; Anastasi 65', 90' (pen.)		40' (pen.) Listanti	Stadium: Comunale; Referee: V. Lattanzi

22 September 1974 5	Avellino	1–2	Juventus	Avellino
	Ferrari 90'		33' Bettega; 85' Viola	Stadium: Stadio Partenio; Referee: Casarin

==== Secondo round ====
25 May 1975 1	Bologna	0–5	Juventus	Bologna
			9', 45', 81' Anastasi; 10' (o.g.) Cresci; 75' Viola	Stadium: Comunale; Referee: Menegali

29 May 1975 2	Juventus	1–2	Inter	Turin
	Viola 53'		58' Boninsegna; 85' Facchetti	Stadium: Comunale; Referee: R. Lattanzi

12 June 1975 3	Milan	1–0	Juventus	Milan
	Bigon 76'			Stadium: Stadio San Siro; Referee: Serafino

15 June 1975 4	Juventus	1–0	Bologna	Turin
	Bettega 60'			Stadium: Comunale; Referee: Bergamo

19 June 1975 5	Inter	2–6	Juventus	Milan
	Boninsegna 21', 70' (pen.)		2', 48' Anastasi; 34', 55' Viola; 53' Scirea; 65' Cuccureddu	Stadium: Stadio San Siro; Referee: Trinchieri

22 June 1975 6	Juventus	2–1	Milan	Turin
	Scirea 12'; Damiani 35'		60' G. Sartori	Stadium: Comunale; Referee: Barboni

=== UEFA Cup ===
==== Round of 32 ====
18 September 1974	(West Germany) 1. FC Frankfurt	2–1	Juventus	Francoforte sull'Oder
	Schuth 3'; Krautzing 74'		8' Capello	Stadium: Stadion der Freundachaft; Referee: (Netherlands) Corver

2 October 1974	Juventus	3–0	(West Germany) 1. FC Frankfurt	Turin
	Anastasi 17'; Hause 34' (o.g.); Altafini 83'			Stadium: Comunale; Referee: (England) Burns

==== Second round ====
23 October 1974	(Scotland) Hibernian	2–4	Juventus	Edinburgh
	Stanton 58'; Cropley 64'		44' Gentile; 69', 87' Altafini; 79' Cuccureddu	Stadium: Easter Road; Referee: (Czechoslovakia) Dubach

6 November 1974	Juventus	4–0	(Scotland) Hibernian	Turin
	Bettega 9'; Anastasi 58', 83'; Altafini 74'			Stadium: Comunale; Referee: (West Germany) Eschweiler

==== Eightfinals ====
27 November 1974	Juventus	1–0	(Netherlands) Ajax	Turin
	Damiani 19'			Stadium: Comunale; Referee: (Austria) Schiller

11 December 1974	(Netherlands) Ajax	2–1	Juventus	Amsterdam
	Blankenburg 14'; Mühren 90'		66' (pen.) Damiani	Stadium: Olympisch Stadion; Referee: (France) Vigliani

==== Quarterfinals ====
5 March 1975	Juventus	2–0	(West Germany) Hamburg SV	Turin
	Capello 3'; Viola 12'			Stadium: Comunale; Referee: (Romania) Rainea

19 March 1975	(West Germany) Hamburg SV	0–0	Juventus	Hamburg
				Stadium: Volksparkstadion; Referee: (Belgium) Laraux

==== Semifinals ====
9 April 1975	(Netherlands) Twente	3–1	Juventus	Enschede
	Jeuring 20'; Zuidema 60', 83'		63' Altafini	Stadium: Diekman Stadion; Referee: (France) Vigliani

23 April 1975	Juventus	0–1	(Netherlands) Twente	Turin
			10' Zuidema	Stadium: Comunale; Referee: (East Germany) Glöckner

== Statistics ==
=== Players statistics ===
No.	Pos	Nat	Player	Total		Serie A		Coppa		UEFA Cup	
No.	Pos	Nat	Player	Apps	Goals	Apps	Goals	Apps	Goals	Apps	Goals
	GK	(Italy) ITA	Dino Zoff	50	-37	30	-19	10	-8	10	-10
	DF	(Italy) ITA	Claudio Gentile	44	1	29	0	6	0	9	1
	DF	(Italy) ITA	Francesco Morini	41	0	25+1	0	6	0	9	0
	DF	(Italy) ITA	Gaetano Scirea	48	2	28	0	10	2	10	0
	DF	(Italy) ITA	Antonello Cuccureddu	44	4	27	2	8	1	9	1
	MF	(Italy) ITA	Franco Causio	45	7	28	7	8	0	9	0
	MF	(Italy) ITA	Fabio Capello	43	6	28	3	6	1	9	2
	MF	(Italy) ITA	Giuseppe Furino	42	0	28	0	7	0	7	0
	MF	(Italy) ITA	Oscar Damiani	27	9	27	9				
	FW	(Italy) ITA	Pietro Anastasi	44	21	22+3	9	10	9	9	3
	FW	(Italy) ITA	Roberto Bettega	47	10	27	6	10	3	10	1
	GK	(Italy) ITA	Massimo Piloni	0	0	0	0				
	FW	(Brazil) BRA	José Altafini	35	13	10+10	8	6	0	9	5
	MF	(Italy) ITA	Fernando Viola	9	1	8+1	1				
	DF	(Italy) ITA	Luciano Spinosi	7	0	7	0				
	DF	(Italy) ITA	Silvio Longobucco	9	0	6+3	0				
	GK	(Italy) ITA	Giancarlo Alessandrelli	0	0	0	0				
	MF	(Italy) ITA	Alberto Marchetti	0	0	0	0				
	FW	(Italy) ITA	Paolo Rossi	2	0	0	0	2	0	0	0

- Source: http://calcio-seriea.net/presenze/1974/739/

=== Goalscorers ===
21 goals

- (Italy) Pietro Anastasi

16 goals

- (Italy) Oscar Damiani

13 goals

- (Brazil) (Italy) José Altafini

10 goals

- (Italy) Roberto Bettega

7 goals

- (Italy) Franco Causio
- (Italy) Fernando Viola

6 goals

- (Italy) Fabio Capello

4 goals

- (Italy) Antonello Cuccureddu

2 goals

- (Italy) Gaetano Scirea

1 goal

- (Italy) Claudio Gentile
