= Massimo Piloni =

Italian footballer and coach

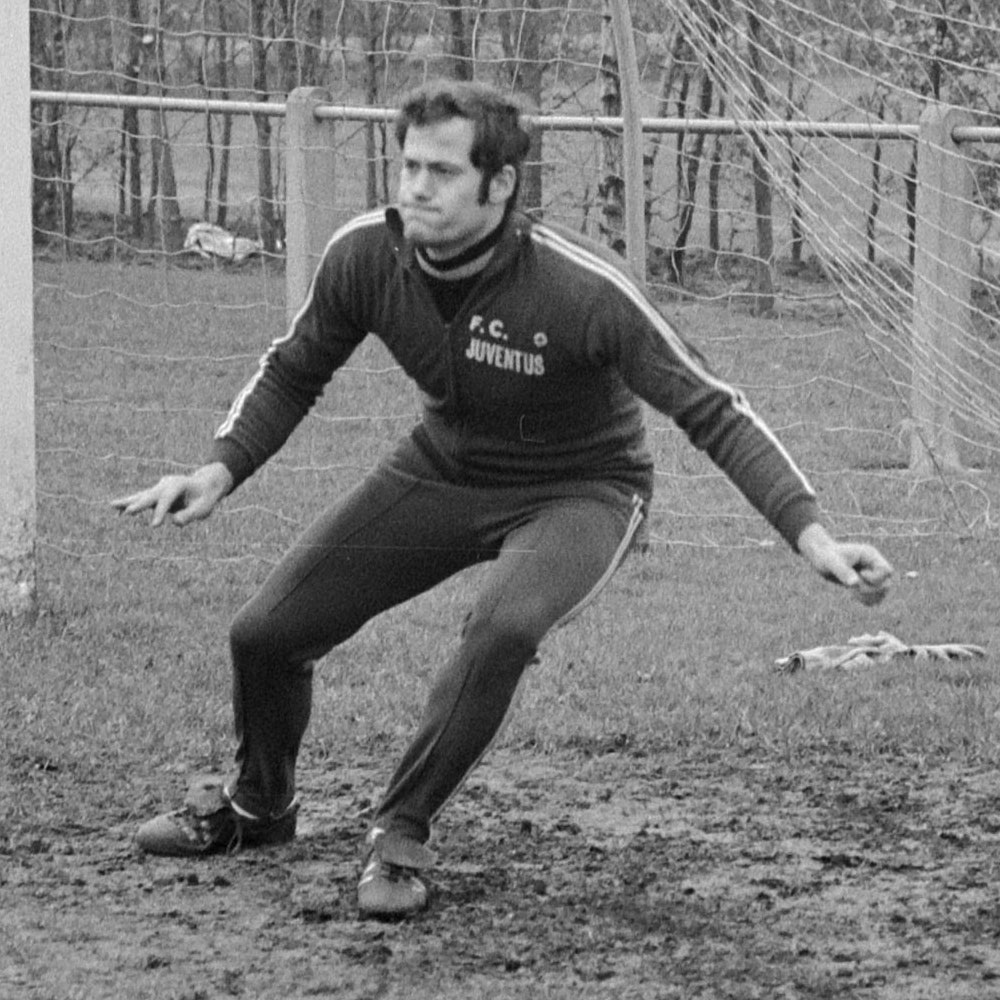
- Piloni in training with Juventus in 1971

Personal information
- Date of birth: 21 August 1948 (age 78)
- Place of birth: Ancona, Italy
- Height: 1.84 m (6 ft 1/2 in)
- Position: Goalkeeper

Senior career*
Years	Team	Apps	(Gls)
1967–1975	Juventus	12	(0)
1968–1969	→ Casertana (loan)	11	(0)
1975–1978	Pescara	105	(0)
1978–1980	Rimini	63	(0)
1980–1981	Fermana		

Managerial career
- 2000–2003: Catania (GK coach)
- * Club domestic league appearances and goals

Massimo Piloni (born 21 August 1948 in Ancona) is an Italian professional football coach and a former player, who played as a goalkeeper.

== Playing career ==
Born in Ancona, Piloni began playing football with the Juventus youth system in 1967. He was later sent to Serie C side Casertana for a season in 1968 in order to gain experience by manager Heriberto Herrera, before returning to Juventus in 1969. He made his Serie A debut in a 2–2 home draw against Varese on 4 April 1971, at the age of 22, under coach Čestmír Vycpálek. That season, he made 7 appearances due to his promising performances, even featuring in the semifinal of the 1971 Inter-Cities Fairs Cup, in a 1–1 away draw against Köln on 14 April. Although it seemed he had overtaken Tancredi, also earning the nickname "Big Pilon", his performances in the first leg of the final against Leeds United, a 2–2 draw, were unconvincing. He was forced to miss the second leg of the final due to injury, which Juventus went on to lose on aggregate. During his time with the Turin club, he was largely a backup to several goalkeepers, including Roberto Anzolin, Roberto Tancredi, and Pietro Carmignani. However, he was mainly the understudy to legendary goalkeeper Dino Zoff, only making an appearance in the Coppa Italia against Cesena on 6 February 1974 during their time at the club together. In 1975, Piloni moved to Serie B side Pescara, helping the club to obtain Serie A promotion in 1977 for the first time in their history, and making a name for himself as an experienced and reliable goalkeeper. In 1978, following Pescara's relegation, he moved to Rimini for two seasons. He ended his career after a season with Serie D side Fermana in 1981.

== Coaching career ==
Following his retirement, Piloni worked as a goalkeeping coach with Catania between 2000 and 2003. After disagreements with the club in 2004, he went on work as a goalkeeping coach around Italy, and even in Scotland, with Italian clubs Perugia, Sambenedettese, and Scottish club Livingston, working with coaches such as Vujadin Boškov, Serse Cosmi, Carlo Mazzone, and Edy Reja, also developing goalkeepers such as Gennaro Iezzo, Andrea Mazzantini, Armando Pantanelli, and Marco Storari. Following an interview with La Gazzetta dello Sport in December 2015, in which he expressed his financial difficulties due to unemployment after having been "abandoned" by the world of football, he was hired by Eccellenza Romana side Atletico Vescovio later that month, as the club's goalkeeping coach.

== Personal life ==
Piloni lives with his wife, Rosanna; together they have a son.

== Honours ==
=== Club ===
Juventus

- Serie A champion: 1971–72, 1972–73, 1974–75.
