= Helmut Haller =

German footballer (1939–2012)

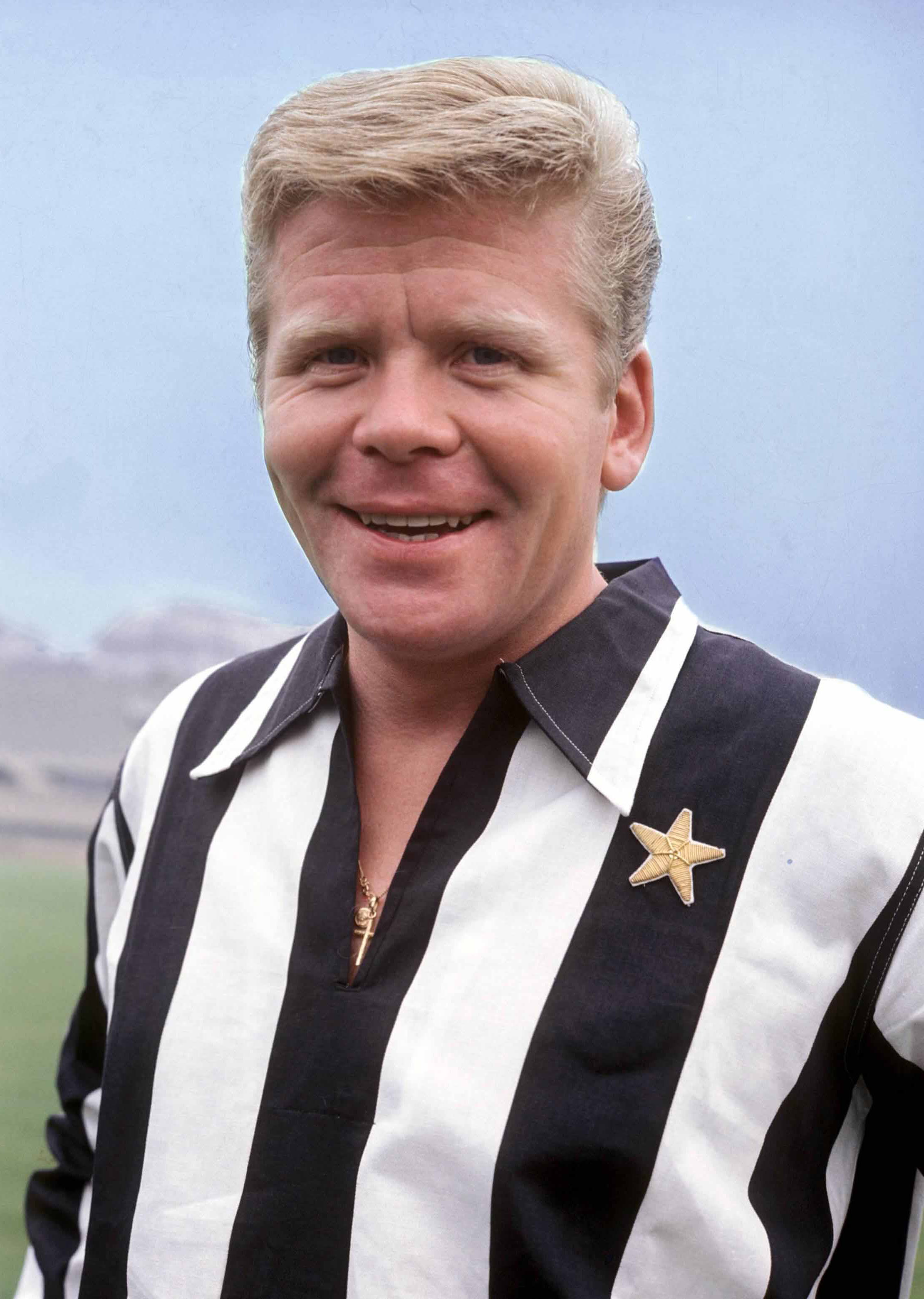
- Haller with Juventus in the 1968–69 season

Personal information
- Date of birth: 21 July 1939
- Place of birth: Augsburg, Germany
- Date of death: 11 October 2012 (aged 73)
- Place of death: Augsburg, Germany
- Height: 1.78 m (5 ft 10 in)
- Position: Forward

Youth career
- 1948–1957: BC Augsburg

Senior career*
Years	Team	Apps	(Gls)
1957–1962	BC Augsburg	85	(24)
1962–1968	Bologna	180	(48)
1968–1973	Juventus	116	(21)
1973–1976	FC Augsburg	79	(21)
1976–1977	BSV Schwenningen	2	(0)
1977–1979	FC Augsburg	15	(2)
Total		477	(116)

International career
1958–1970	West Germany	33	(13)
Medal record
Men's football
Representing West Germany
FIFA World Cup
Runner-up	1966 England
Third place	1970 Mexico
- * Club domestic league appearances and goals

Helmut Haller (German pronunciation: [ˈhɛlmuːt ˈhalɐ]; 21 July 1939 – 11 October 2012) was a German footballer who played as a forward. At international level, he represented West Germany at three World Cups. At club level, he played in both Germany and Italy, and won Italian league titles with Bologna and Juventus.

== Club career ==
In his club career, Haller played from 1948 until 1962 for BC Augsburg, before being lured to Italy by a one off fee of 750,000 Marks and an annual salary of 200,000 Marks. Back then in Germany player salaries were officially limited to 500 Marks per month – an amount that rose to 2500 Marks after the introduction of the Bundesliga as unified first division in 1963. In Italy Haller encountered with Albert Brülls, Karl-Heinz Schnellinger and Horst Szymaniak three more German World Cup participants of 1962.

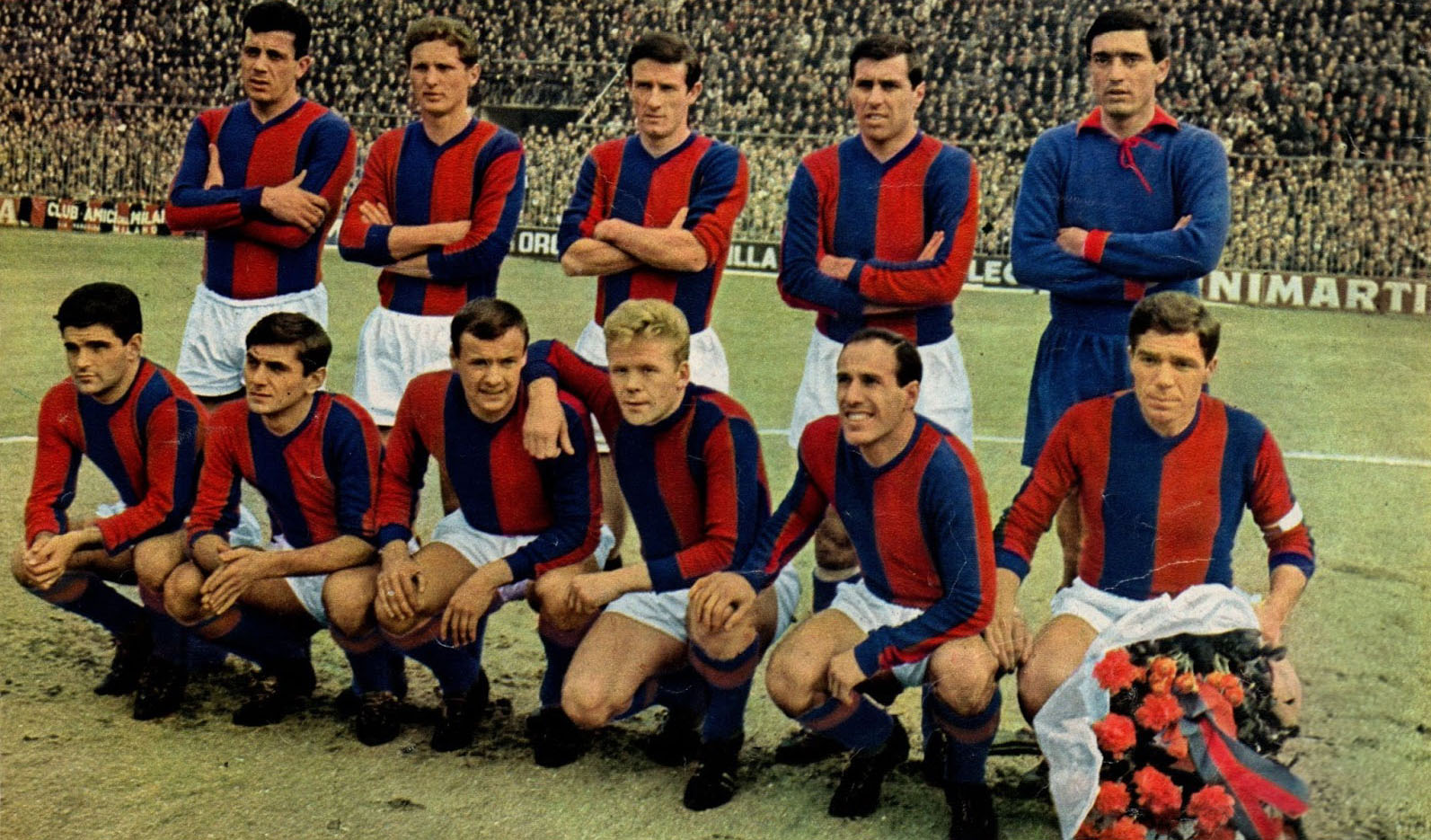
Haller (kneeling, third from the right) with the 1963–64 Italian champion Bologna

Initially Haller played for Bologna, winning in 1964 under coach Fulvio Bernardini the first Italian league title for the club in 23 years and the hitherto last in the club's history. From 1968 until 1973 he played for Juventus where he won the league in 1972 and 1973. In 1973 Juventus – with Dino Zoff in goal, Franco Causio, Fabio Capello and the Brazilian José Altafini – reached the European Champions Cup final in Belgrade against AFC Ajax. The Johan Cruijff led title holder went into the lead by a fourth minute Johnny Rep header. Haller was brought on by coach Čestmír Vycpálek in the 49th minute for Roberto Bettega, but the result stood. Two years earlier Juventus narrowly missed out in the finals of the 1970–71 Inter-Cities Fairs Cup, having to concede the title to the Billy Bremner led Leeds United after results of 2–2 and 1–1 on the away goal rule.

In 1973, he returned to his hometown and joined FC Augsburg, then newly created through a merger of his former club BC Augsburg with local rivals TSV Schwaben and just promoted to the second division Regionalliga. The club had paid just DM 44,000 for the transfer of Haller and Haller renounced a fixed salary, settling for 5% of the revenue. "Haller-Haller-Hallerluja" became the new battlecry of the team. In late summer 1973, it was not the least due to his popularity that a match in the Munich Olympic Stadium against hosts TSV 1860 attracted an audience of estimated up to 90,000, a world record for second division matches. Augsburg finished that season first in the southern division of the Regionalliga. In the promotion the club missed out on ascension to the Bundesliga by one point to Tennis Borussia Berlin.

Haller retired as player in 1979.

== International career ==
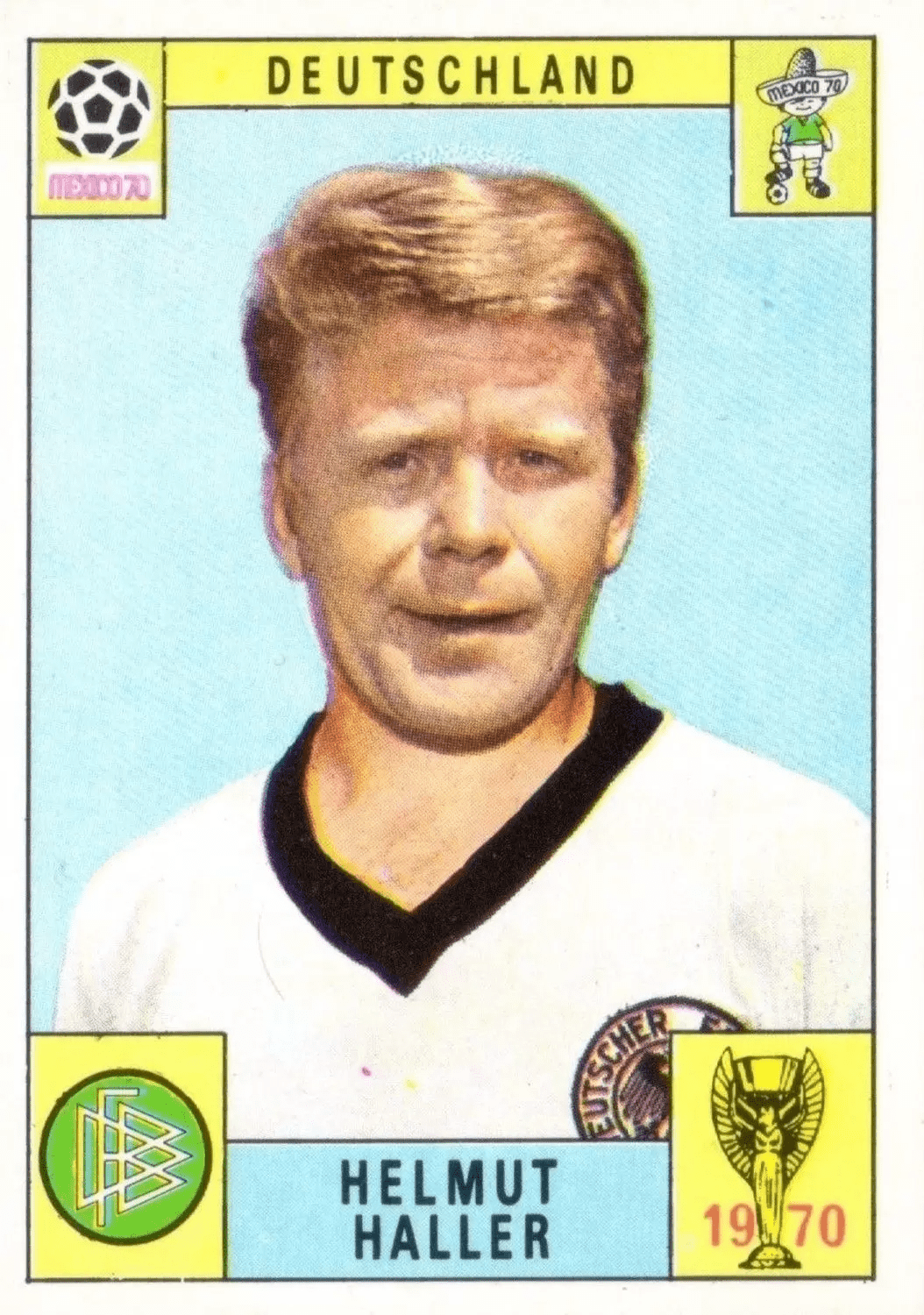
Haller with West Germany on a 1970 Panini sticker

After he made his international debut at age 19 in 1958, he played in three World Cups; his first in the 1962 World Cup held in Chile, the 1966 World Cup in England and the 1970 World Cup held in Mexico, earning a total of 33 caps and scoring 13 goals.

At the World Cup 1962, Haller was a regular of the German side that drew against Italy and overcame hosts Chile and Switzerland in the group phase, but in the quarterfinals Yugoslavia prevailed 1–0. At the World Cup 1966 he formed the West German midfield together with Wolfgang Overath and the young Franz Beckenbauer. West Germany reached the final of competition and Haller scored the opening goal of the game which Germany lost 2–4 to England. Along with his medal, Haller also got the match ball, though more than 30 years later he returned to England to present it to Geoff Hurst, who had scored a hat-trick in the contest and was therefore by tradition considered to be entitled to the ball. After Portugal's Eusébio, who scored nine goals, he was with six goals the second best marksman of the tournament. At the 1970 World Cup, where West Germany attained third place, Haller was only used in the first group match against Morocco, being replaced by Jürgen Grabowski at halftime. Haller was plagued by injury problems in the run-up to the tournament.

== Style of play ==
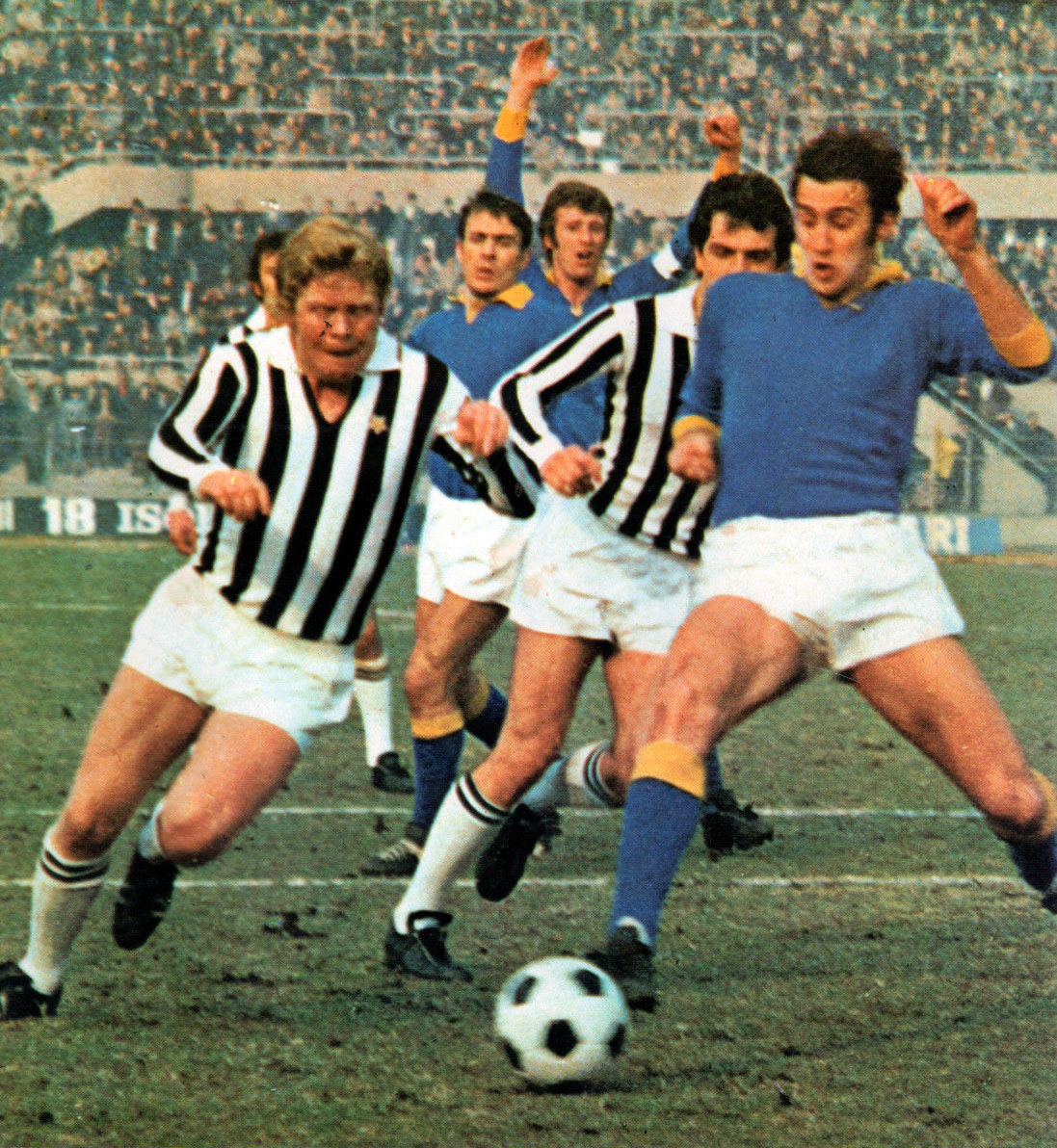
Haller (left) playing for the Bianconeri in 1971 against Verona

Haller was a playmaker, a goalscorer and a striker for Bologna in the 1960s. He had weight problems throughout his career. In Italy Haller is considered one of the top wingers of the sixties and the defining player of Bologna.

== After retirement ==
In later years Haller did some coaching of amateur level clubs, including FC Augsburg, and ran a fashion shop.

== Personal life ==
On Boxing Day 2006, Haller suffered a serious heart attack and was reported to be recovering well after treatment. Later he also suffered from dementia and Parkinson's disease. Haller died on 11 October 2012. He was survived by his third wife, the native Cuban Noraimy Rodriguez Guiterrez, whom he married in 2003 when she was aged just 21, two sons and a daughter. Haller was also an uncle of Christian Hochstätter, a long-serving Borussia Mönchengladbach player and twice West German international.

== Honours ==
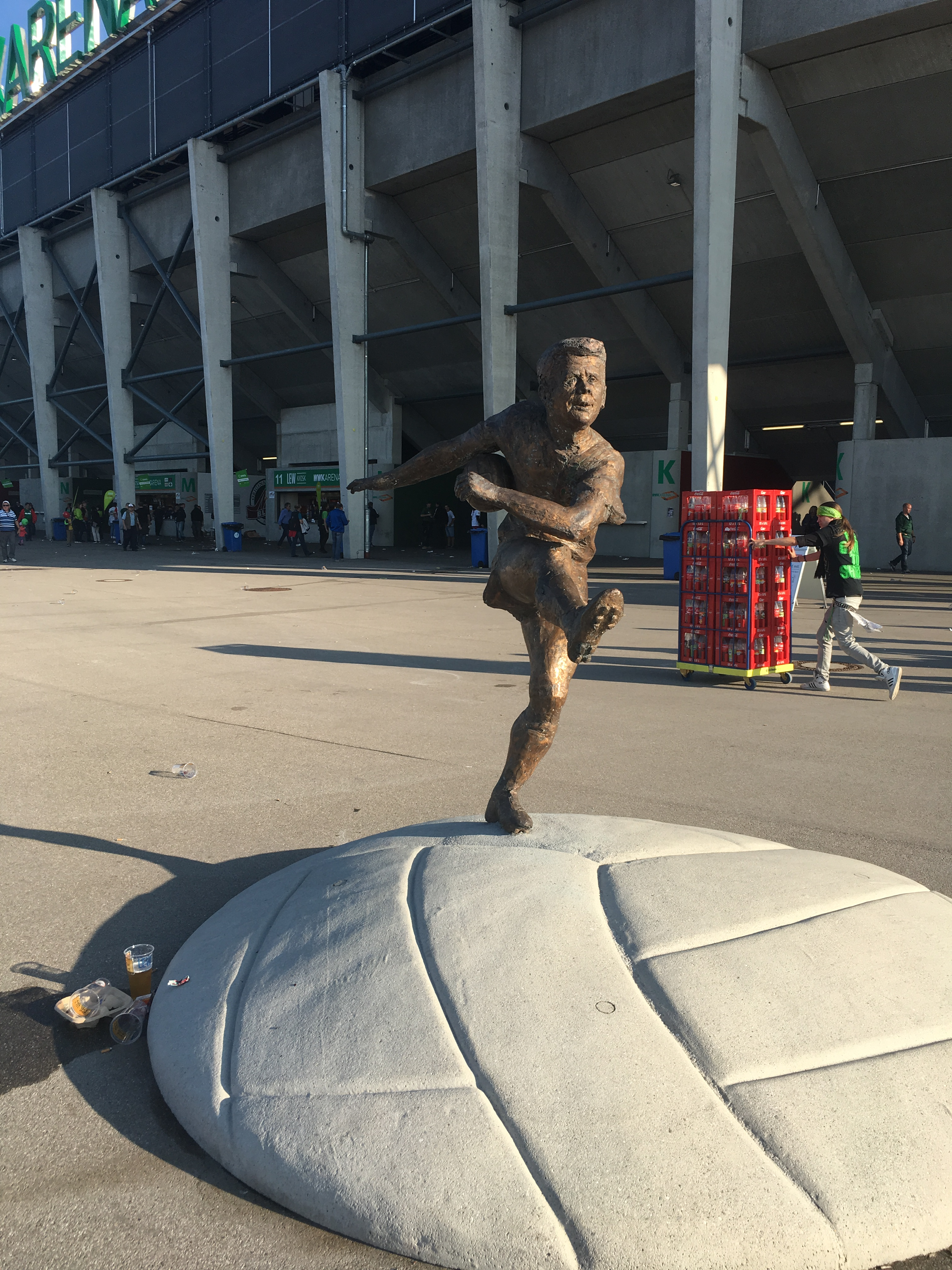
Statue of Helmut Haller outside the WWK-Arena in Augsburg

Bologna

- Serie A: 1963–64

Juventus

- Serie A: 1971–72, 1972–73
- European Cup: runner-up 1972–73
- Inter-Cities Fairs Cup: runner-up 1971
- Coppa Italia: runner-up 1972–73

Augsburg

- Regionalliga Süd: 1973–74

Germany

- FIFA World Cup: runner-up 1966, third place 1970

== See also ==
- List of FIFA World Cup top goalscorers
