= Silvio Longobucco =

Italian footballer (1951–2022)

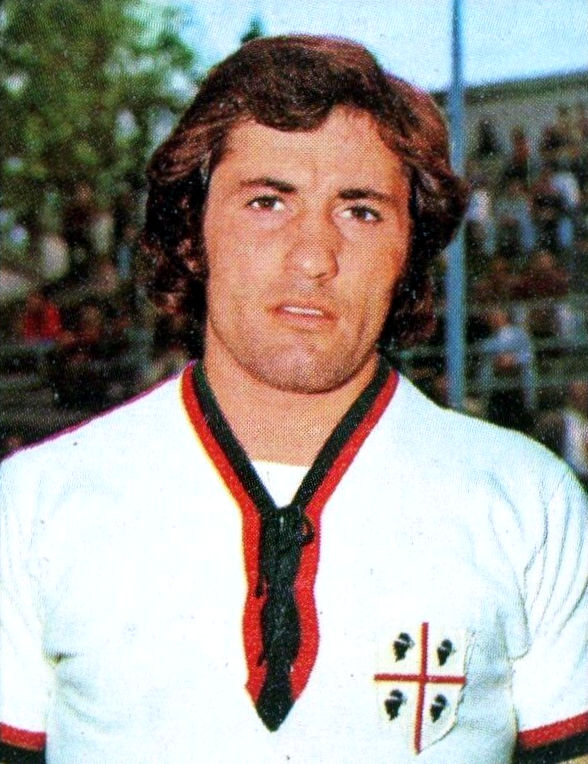
- Longobucco with Cagliari in 1975

Personal information
- Date of birth: 5 June 1951
- Place of birth: Scalea, Italy
- Date of death: 2 April 2022 (aged 70)
- Place of death: Scalea, Italy
- Height: 1.77 m (5 ft 10 in)
- Position: Defender

Senior career*
Years	Team	Apps	(Gls)
1969–1971	Ternana	34	(0)
1971–1975	Juventus	47	(0)
1975–1982	Cagliari	172	(3)
1982–1983	Cosenza	24	(1)
Total		277	(4)
- * Club domestic league appearances and goals

Silvio Longobucco (5 June 1951 – 2 April 2022) was an Italian professional footballer who played as a defender.

== Honours ==
Juventus

- Serie A: 1971–72, 1972–73, 1974–75
