= Gianpietro Marchetti =

Italian footballer (1948–2026)

- Marchetti with Juventus in 1971

Personal information
- Date of birth: 22 October 1948
- Place of birth: Rudiano, Italy
- Date of death: 5 November 2026 (aged 78)
- Height: 1.80 m (5 ft 11 in)
- Position: Defender

Senior career*
Years	Team	Apps	(Gls)
1966–1968	Atalanta	6	(0)
1968–1969	Lecco	37	(3)
1969–1974	Juventus	102	(6)
1974–1979	Atalanta	124	(1)
1979–1980	Catanzaro	10	(0)
Total		279	(10)

International career
1972–1973	Italy	5	(0)
- * Club domestic league appearances and goals

Gianpietro Marchetti (Italian pronunciation: [dʒamˈpjɛːtro marˈketti]; 22 October 1948 – 5 November 2026) was an Italian professional footballer who played as a defender. He died on 5 November 2026, at the age of 78.

== Honours ==
Juventus

- Serie A: 1971–72, 1972–73
