= Francesco Morini =

Italian footballer (1944–2021)

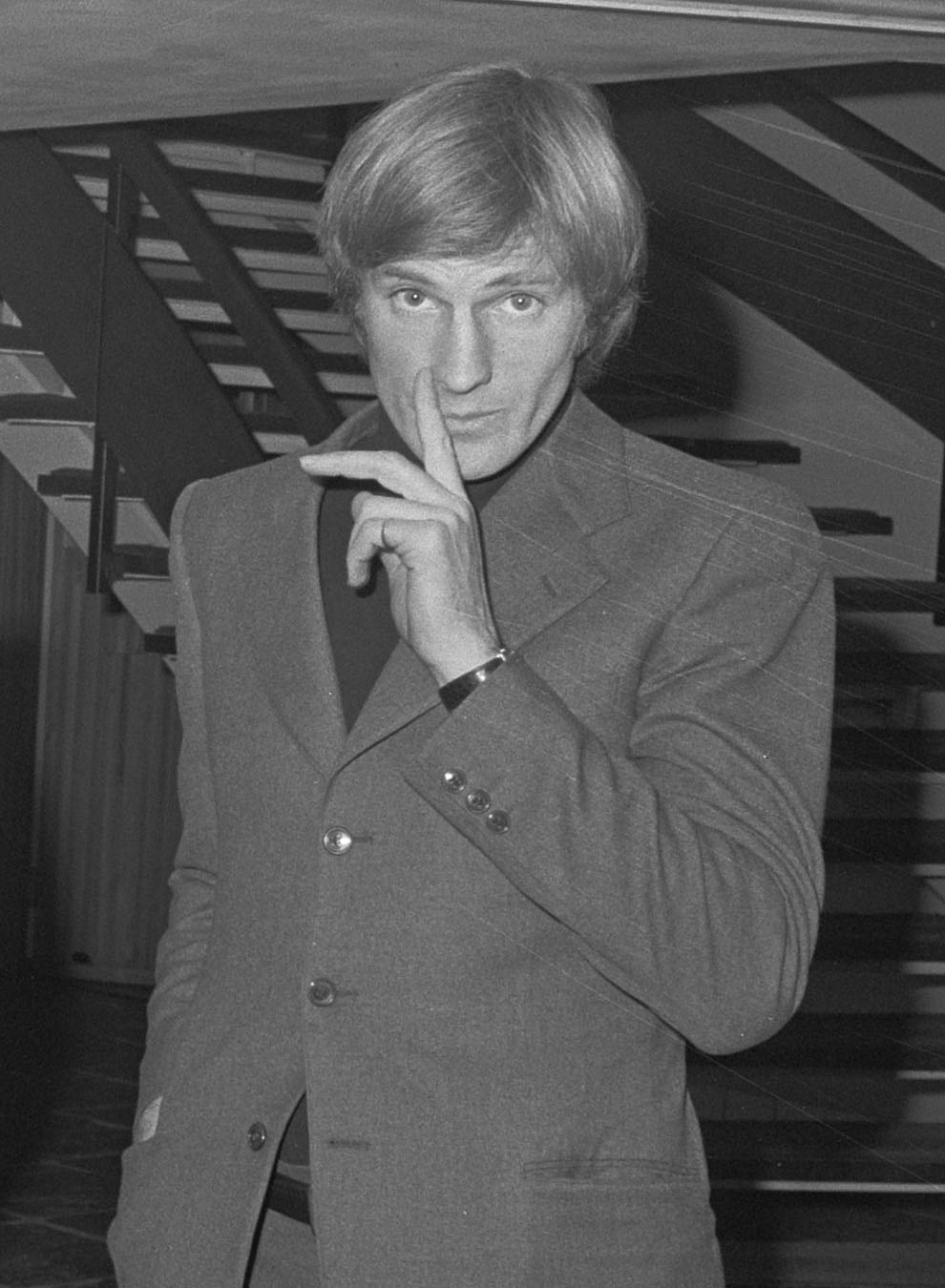
- Morini in 1971

Personal information
- Date of birth: 12 August 1944
- Place of birth: San Giuliano Terme, Tuscany, Italy
- Date of death: 31 August 2021 (aged 77)
- Place of death: Forte dei Marmi, Tuscany, Italy
- Height: 1.85 m (6 ft 1 in)
- Position: Defender

Senior career*
Years	Team	Apps	(Gls)
1963–1969	Sampdoria	161	(0)
1969–1980	Juventus	256	(0)
1980	Toronto Blizzard	22	(0)
Total		439	(0)

International career
1973–1975	Italy	11	(0)
- * Club domestic league appearances and goals

Francesco Morini (Italian pronunciation: [franˈtʃesko moˈriːni]; 12 August 1944 – 31 August 2021) was an Italian professional footballer who played as a defender. He competed for the Italy national team in the 1974 FIFA World Cup and earned a total of 11 caps. He played for clubs such as Sampdoria and, most notably, Juventus, with which he achieved great success.

After his retirement he worked as Juventus's sporting director for several years.

== Club career ==
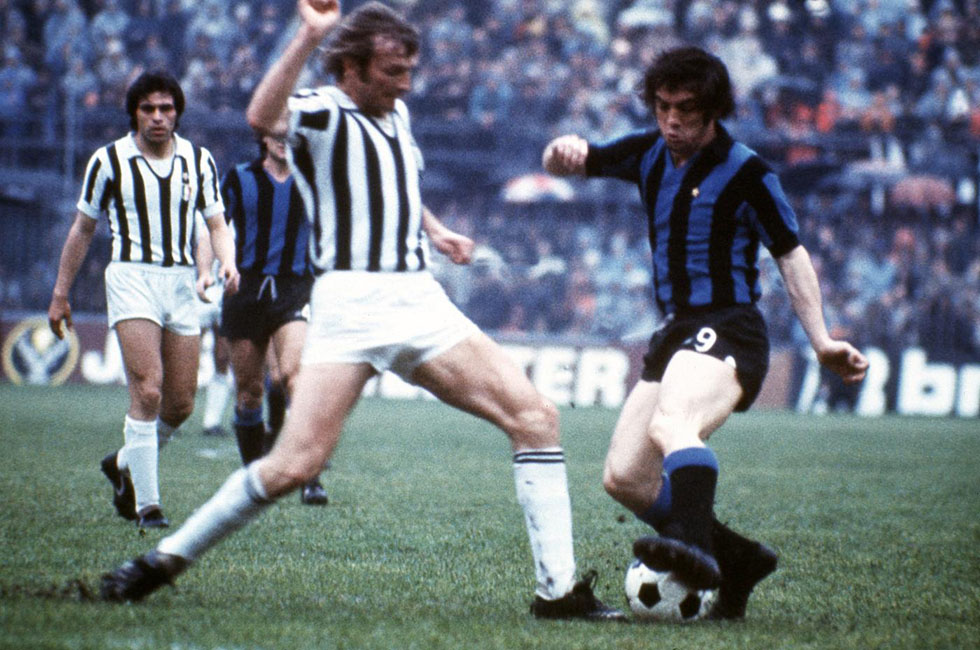
Morini (left) playing for Juventus in 1974 against his iconic rival of Inter Milan, and future Juventus teammate, Roberto Boninsegna.

Morini made his Serie A debut for Sampdoria in a 2–0 loss against Roma on 2 February 1964, and in 1969, he was transferred to Juventus. He made 387 appearances in Serie A, as well as 30 in Serie B with Sampdoria during the 1966–67 season, during which he won the title.

During a highly successful domestic and European stint with Juventus, Morini won five Serie A titles, a Coppa Italia during the 1978–79 season, and an UEFA Cup during the 1976–77 season, also reaching the European Cup final during the 1972–73 season, and the semi-final of the European Cup Winners' Cup during the 1979–80 season, his final season at the club. Throughout his professional footballing career as a defender, Morini never scored a goal; although he once appeared to score one during a friendly tournament, it was disallowed. Morini ended his career in Canada with the Toronto Blizzard.

== International career ==
Morini made his international debut for the Italy national team in a 1–0 home win over Turkey on 25 February 1973, and was a member of the Italian squad that took part in the 1974 FIFA World Cup. He played for Italy 11 times between 1973 and 1975. Although he was still part of the Italy national side during the mid-70s, he was notably excluded by Enzo Bearzot from the Italian squad that finished in fourth place at the 1978 FIFA World Cup.

== Style of play ==
Morini was a fast, strong, and tenacious centre-back, with good technique, who was known for his tackling ability, as well as his tight marking of opposing forwards. He was given the nickname "Morgan the Pirate" as he excelled as a powerful ball-winner; despite his physical style of play, he was also known for his correct behaviour on the pitch, and he rarely committed aggressive challenges. On the pitch, he was also well known for his rivalry with Inter forward Roberto Boninsegna, who later became his teammate.

== Personal life ==
Morini had two sons; one is Jacopo Morini, who is known for his role in the Italian television program "Le Iene", and the other, Andrea, is a singer and guitarist in a band.

== Honours ==
Juventus

- Serie A: 1971–72, 1972–73, 1974–75, 1976–77, 1977–78
- Coppa Italia: 1978–79
- UEFA Cup: 1976–77

Sampdoria

- Serie B: 1966–67

Individual

- Juventus FC Hall of Fame: 2025
