= Luciano Spinosi =

Italian footballer (born 1950)

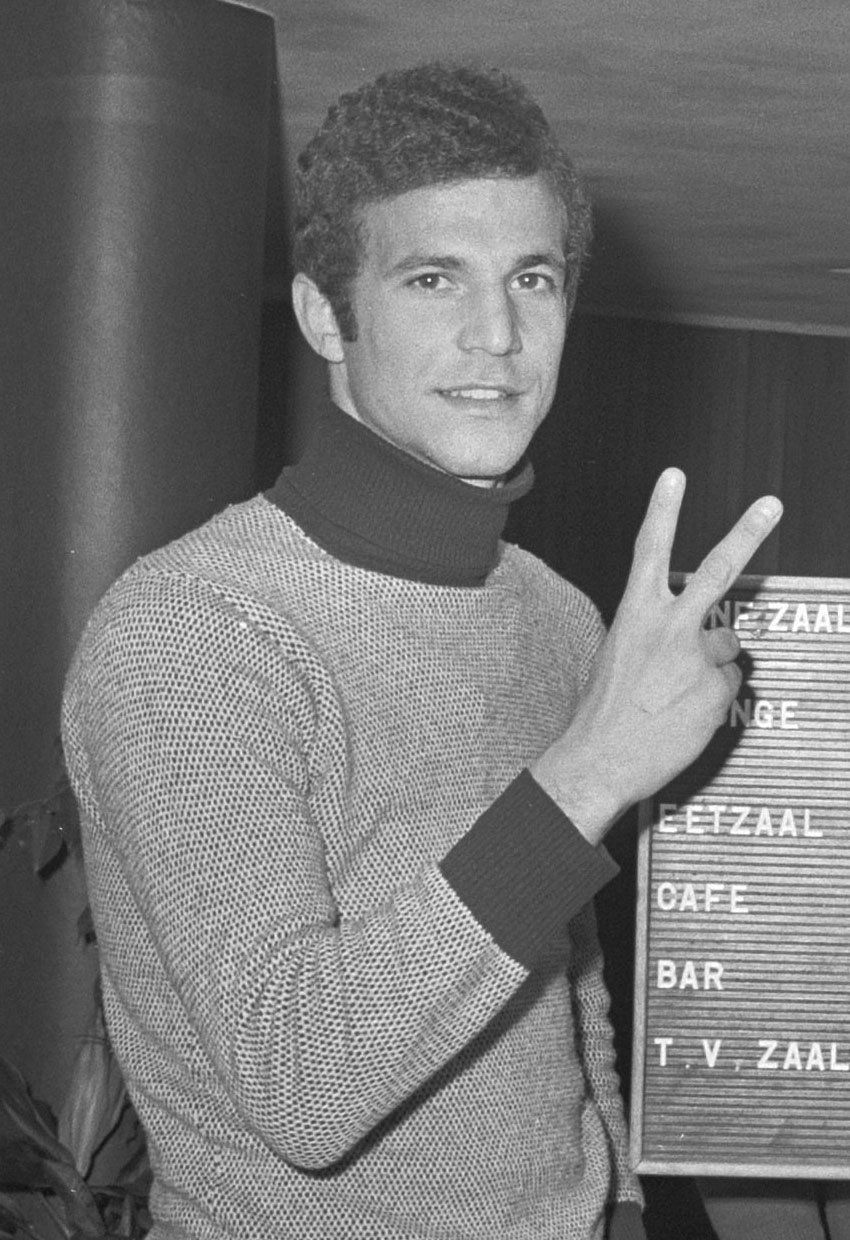
- Spinosi at Enschede in 1971

Personal information
- Date of birth: 9 May 1950 (age 76)
- Place of birth: Rome, Italy
- Height: 1.82 m (6 ft 0 in)
- Position: Defender

Youth career
- Tevere Roma

Senior career*
Years	Team	Apps	(Gls)
1966–1967	Tevere Roma	2	(0)
1967–1970	Roma	37	(4)
1970–1978	Juventus	138	(1)
1978–1982	Roma	77	(1)
1982–1983	Hellas Verona	30	(0)
1983–1984	Milan	18	(0)
1984–1985	Cesena	22	(0)
Total		324	(6)

International career
1969–1971	Italy U-21	3	(0)
1971–1974	Italy	19	(1)

Managerial career
- 1985–?: Roma (youth)
- 1989: Roma
- 1994: Lecce
- 1996: Ternana
- 1996–1997: Sampdoria (technical assistant)
- 1997–2004: Lazio (assistant)
- 2007: Livorno (assistant)
- * Club domestic league appearances and goals

Luciano Spinosi (Italian pronunciation: [luˈtʃaːno spiˈnoːzi, -oːsi]; born 9 May 1950) is an Italian former football coach and a former player who played as a defender.

== Club career ==
The clubs for which Spinosi played include A.S. Roma and Juventus FC He also played for Hellas Verona F.C., A.C. Milan and A.C. Cesena.

== International career ==
For the Italy national football team Spinosi totaled 22 caps: 19 at senior level, between 1971 and 1974, and 3 at youth level, between 1969 and 1971. His Italy under-21 debut came on 19 November 1969 in a 2–0 loss to the Netherlands. He made his senior international debut on 9 June 1971, in a 0–0 draw against Sweden; his only international goal came on 17 June 1972, in a 3–3 draw against Romania. Spinosi was also a member of the Italy national team that later took part at the 1974 FIFA World Cup under manager Ferruccio Valcareggi.

== Style of play ==
A tenacious, hard-tackling, and reliable defender, Spinosi usually played as a right-back early on in his career, but was later deployed as a man-marking centre-back, or "stopper". He was known for his temperament, concentration, tight marking of opponents, and professionalism, and was capable of playing both in a zonal marking and man-marking system. He also possessed solid technique, which enabled him to contribute to his teams attacking plays with runs up the flank, and he was even deployed as a wide midfielder on occasion during his time with Roma. Due to his height, he excelled in the air, and was known for his ability to utilise his aerial prowess by making attacking runs into the penalty area.

== Personal life ==
His older brother Enrico Spinosi also played football professionally. To distinguish them, Enrico was referred to as Spinosi I and Luciano as Spinosi II.

== Honours ==
Roma

- Coppa Italia: 1968–69, 1979–80, 1980–81

Juventus

- Serie A: 1971–72, 1972–73, 1974–75, 1976–77, 1977–78
- UEFA Cup: 1976–77
