= Adriano Novellini =

Italian footballer and manager (born 1948)

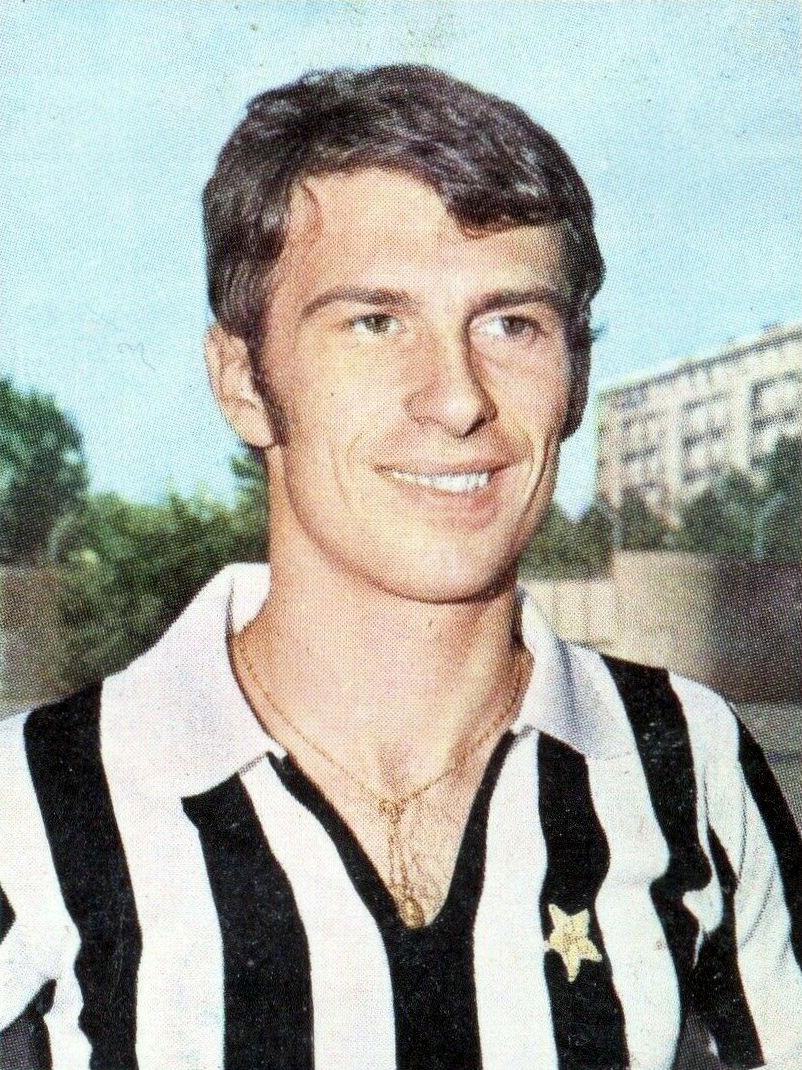
- Novellini with Juventus in 1971

Personal information
- Date of birth: September 2, 1948 (age 78)
- Place of birth: Mariana Mantovana, Italy
- Height: 1.76 m (5 ft 9 1/2 in)
- Position: Midfielder

Senior career*
Years	Team	Apps	(Gls)
1967–1970	Atalanta	51	(10)
1970–1972	Juventus	19	(2)
1972–1974	Bologna	33	(6)
1974–1975	Cagliari	17	(2)
1975–1977	Palermo	54	(5)
1978–1979	Iglesias		
1979–1981	Carbonia		

Managerial career
- 2001: Villaggio 88
- * Club domestic league appearances and goals

Adriano Novellini (born September 2, 1948) is an Italian footballer who played as a midfielder. He played 85 games in the Serie A for four different clubs.

== Honours ==
Juventus

- Serie A champion: 1971–72.

Bologna

- Coppa Italia winner: 1973–74.
