= Fernando Viola =

Italian footballer

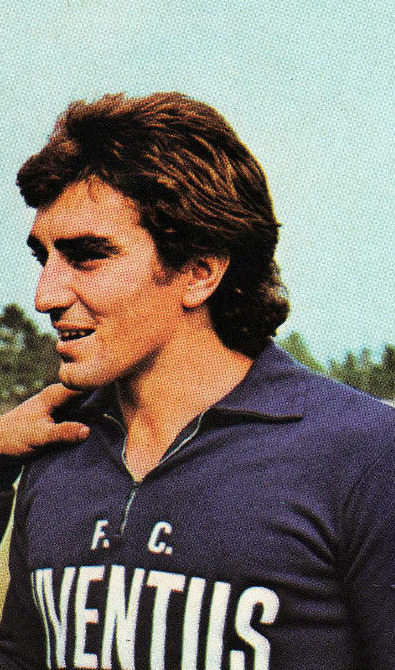
- Fernando Viola in 1974.

Personal information
- Date of birth: 14 March 1951
- Place of birth: Torrazza Piemonte, Italy
- Date of death: 5 February 2001 (aged 49)
- Place of death: Rome, Italy
- Height: 1.74 m (5 ft 8 1/2 in)
- Position: Midfielder

Senior career*
Years	Team	Apps	(Gls)
1971–1975	Juventus	21	(1)
1972–1973	→ Mantova (loan)	36	(2)
1975–1976	Cagliari	28	(3)
1976–1977	Lazio	19	(2)
1977–1978	Bologna	18	(1)
1978–1982	Lazio	102	(10)
1982–1984	Genoa	41	(1)
1984–1985	Barletta	32	(3)
1985–1986	ASC Subiaco		
- * Club domestic league appearances and goals

Fernando Viola (born 14 March 1951 in Torrazza Piemonte; died 5 February 2001 in Rome in a road accident driving his scooter) was an Italian professional footballer who played as a midfielder.

== Career ==
Viola began playing professional football with Juventus, where he would make his Serie A debut against Bologna on 12 March 1972.
