= Pietro Anastasi =

Italian footballer (1948–2020)

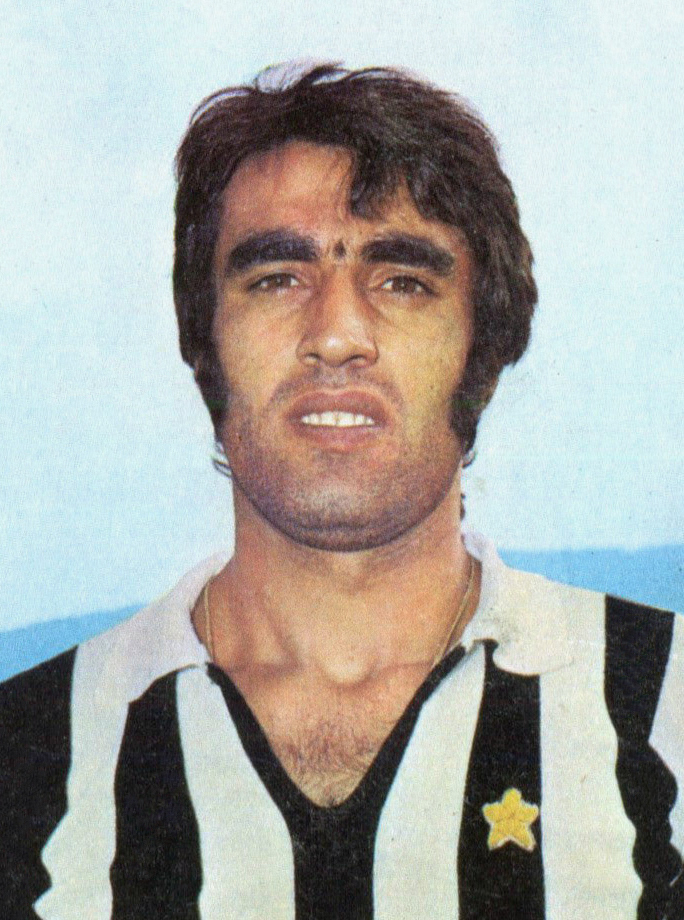
- Anastasi with Juventus during the 1971–72 season

Personal information
- Date of birth: 7 April 1948
- Place of birth: Catania, Italy
- Date of death: 17 January 2020 (aged 71)
- Place of death: Varese, Italy
- Height: 1.72 m (5 ft 8 in)
- Position: Forward

Youth career
- 1964–66: Massiminiana

Senior career*
Years	Team	Apps	(Gls)
1966–1968	Varese	66	(17)
1968–1976	Juventus	205	(78)
1976–1978	Inter Milan	46	(7)
1978–1981	Ascoli	58	(9)
1981–1982	Lugano	14	(10)
Total		389	(121)

International career
1967	Italy under-21	6	(2)
1968	Italy B Team	4	(2)
1968–1974	Italy	25	(8)
Medal record
Men's football
Representing Italy (as player)
UEFA European Championship
Winner	1968 Italy
- * Club domestic league appearances and goals

Pietro Anastasi (Italian pronunciation: [ˈpjɛːtro anaˈstaːzi]; 7 April 1948 – 17 January 2020), nicknamed Petruzzu 'u turcu (Sicilian for 'Pete the Turk') by fans, was an Italian footballer who played mainly in the role of a forward.

He started his professional club career in Italy with Varese in 1966, helping the club to achieve promotion to Serie A in his first season with the side; after a promising debut campaign in the Italian top-flight the following season, he joined Juventus in 1968, where he enjoyed a highly successful and prolific eight–year stint, winning three Serie A titles. He then spent two seasons with Internazionale, where he won the Coppa Italia in 1978, before moving to Ascoli, where he remained for three seasons. He finally retired in 1982, after a single season with Swiss club Lugano.

At international level, Anastasi represented Italy on 25 occasions between 1968 and 1975, scoring eight goals. He made his senior international debut at UEFA Euro 1968 on home soil, and is widely known for later scoring in the final victory over Yugoslavia, which gave Italy their first ever European Championship title. He later also took part at the 1974 FIFA World Cup.

After retiring, he worked as a pundit. He died on 17 January 2020 from amyotrophic lateral sclerosis.

== Club career ==
Anastasi was born in Catania, Sicily. During his career (1964–1982), he played for Massiminiana, Varese, Juventus, Internazionale and Ascoli. In Serie A, he played 338 matches and scored 105 goals (For Juventus, he played 205 games and scored 78 goals). Although he never won the Serie A Top Goalscorer award, he was the third highest goalscorer in the League on three occasions, during the 1968–69, 1969–70 and 1973–74 seasons.

He made his professional debut with Missiminiana di Catania in Serie D, showing promising goalscoring prowess during the 1965–66 season, in which he scored 18 goals. He was subsequently purchased by Varese in Serie B, the team with which he gained promotion to Serie A, scoring six goals in 37 matches, and making his Serie A debut in the 1967–68 season on 24 September 1967, against Fiorentina, at the age of nineteen. During his first season in Serie A, he scored an impressive 11 goals, three of which were scored in Varese's shocking 5–0 win over Juventus on 4 February 1968, a performance which enabled him to be called up to the Italy national side.

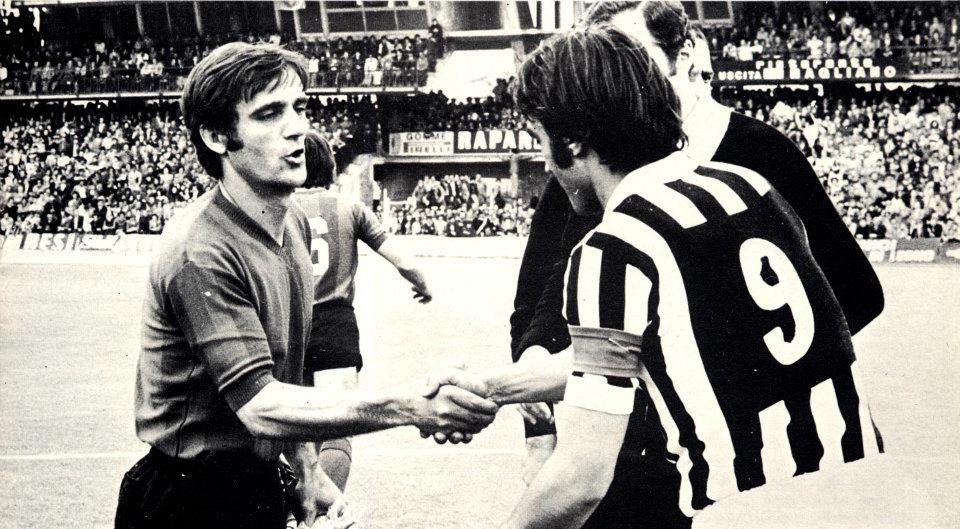
Anastasi (no. 9) in 1975, as captain of Juventus, with Ternana captain Fernando Benatti

Due to his precocious performances, he was purchased by Juventus in 1968 for a world record of 650 million Lire at the time, and with the Turin club, he won three Serie A titles, also helping the club to the final of the last edition of the Inter-Cities Fairs Cup, in 1971, a tournament in which he was top scorer, with ten goals. Juventus were defeated by Leeds in the final, however. In 1974, Anastasi was named the club's captain. He currently holds the record for the most goals in the Inter-Cities Fairs Cup by a Juventus player (12), as well as the all-time record for goals in the Coppa Italia by a Juventus player (30). Alongside Roberto Baggio, he is the joint tenth highest goal-scorer for Juventus in Serie A, with 78 goals, the joint fourth all-time Juventus goalscorer in European competitions, and the joint fifth all-time Juventus goalscorer in International competitions, with 22 goals. He is also the seventh-highest all-time goalscorer for the club in all competitions. With Juventus, he was also the top-scorer of the 1974–75 edition of the Coppa Italia, in which Juventus reached the second round, finishing second in their group, and missing the final by a single point. Anastasi also reached the final of the 1972–73 European Cup with Juventus, where they were defeated 1–0 by Ajax. In total, he scored 130 goals for Juventus, in 303 appearances.

In 1976, Anastasi began to find less space within the first team Juventus squad, partially due to his disagreements with manager Carlo Parola, and he transferred to Inter in exchange for Roberto Boninsegna. With Inter, Anastasi won the 1977–78 Coppa Italia, making a substitute appearance in the final against Napoli, although his Inter performances were not as consistent or prolific as those with Juventus. As a result, he was sold to Ascoli in 1978, and he remained at the club for three more Serie A seasons, scoring 9 goals. In December 1979, he scored his 100th goal in Serie A in a 3–2 win over his former club, Juventus. He spent his final year playing for Lugano in the Swiss League, during the 1981–82 season, before retiring.

== International career ==
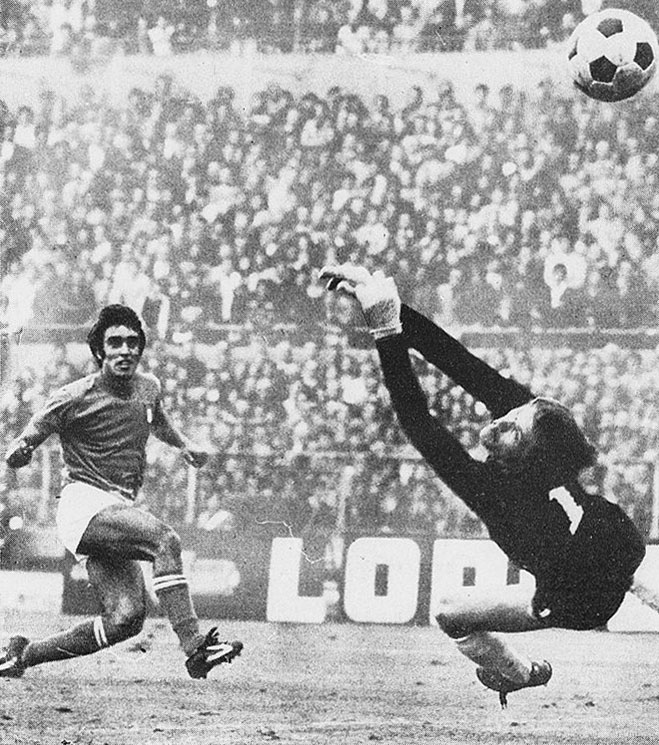
Anastasi (left) beats Marić and scores the definitive goal in Italy's 3–1 friendly victory against Yugoslavia, in Turin, on 20 September 1972.

With the Italy national team, Anastasi was a member of the squad that won the 1968 UEFA European Football Championship on home soil, a tournament during which he made his international debut during the first leg of the final against Yugoslavia at the Stadio Olimpico in Rome on 8 June, which ended in a 1–1 draw. In the final replay against the same opponent two days later, he also scored his first international goal, the second goal in Italy's 2–0 victory, with a right-footed volley from just outside the area; with this goal, he became the youngest player ever to score in a European Championship final, at the age of 20 years and 64 days. He was initially set to take part in the 1970 FIFA World Cup in Mexico with Italy, but he was unable to participate due to injury. In his place, and that of midfielder Giovanni Lodetti, two strikers were called up by manager Ferruccio Valcareggi: Roberto Boninsegna and Pierino Prati, as Italy went on to reach the final. Anastasi also participated at the 1974 FIFA World Cup, scoring one goal in the team's 3–1 victory against Haiti in the first round, although Italy failed to advance from their group. In total, he played 25 international matches for Italy between 1968 and 1975, scoring 8 goals.

== Style of play ==
Anastasi is regarded as one of the best Italian strikers of his generation. A diminutive player with a sturdy build, Anastasi usually played as a striker in the centre-forward position, like his idol, John Charles; however, he had a rather modern and unorthodox interpretation of this role, and did not function as a traditional number nine, who mainly operated inside the box. Indeed, in this role, although he was capable of playing with his back to goal, using his strength to hold up the ball and lay it off for teammates, he was also known for his mobility and link-up play, as well as his ability to make quick exchanges with his teammates, and create chances or provide assists for other players, which saw him essentially act as more of an attacking midfielder at times. He also stood out for his dedication, bravery, fighting spirit, and generous team-play, as well as his unpredictable movement and high defensive work-rate off the ball, including his tendency to drift out wide, press opponents, or even track back into midfield in order to help win back possession. As such, he has been described as what as is known in Italian football jargon as a centravanti di manovra ("manouvering centre-forward", i.e. a centre-forward who participates in the build-up of attacking plays), a role which has retroactively been likened to a precursor of the "false 9" role in modern football. Citing his speed and dribbling skills with either foot, Italian journalist Cesare Lanza compared him to Luigi Meroni; as such, he also played on the right wing on occasion, due to his flair, solid technique, and crossing ability, and he even had a tendency to drift onto the left flank when he was deployed as an out-and-out striker in order to create chances for his teammates.

Nicknamed "il Pelé bianco" ("the white Pelé", in Italian) by the Juventus fans, Anastasi was extremely popular with his club's fanbase, and was known in particular for his acrobatic ability in the air, as well as for having a penchant for scoring spectacular goals with strikes of extreme technical difficulty, including from volleys and bicycle kicks. He was also an excellent finisher with either foot, despite being naturally right-footed, and was capable of scoring with powerful shots while on the run. In addition to his playing ability, as a Sicilian who had success Juventus, Anastasi – as well as several of his other southern–Italian club teammates – also became a social symbol for many other southern Italian immigrants in a time of great social divide between the northern and the southern regions of the country; in particular, he became an icon for factory-workers who had moved from the South of Italy to Turin in order to find work with Fiat. His other nicknames were "Petruzzo" and "Petru 'u turcu" ("Peter the Turk", in the Sicilian dialect), due to the dark, olive-colour of his complexion whenever he was tanned. Off the pitch, however, he did at times draw criticism in the media for his lack of discipline.

== After retirement ==
After retiring from professional football, Anastasi worked briefly as a youth coach, and later served as a football pundit for the Italian television network 7 Gold and SKY.

== Personal life ==
Anastasi was married to Anna; together, they had two sons: Silvano and Gianluca. He met his wife during his time with Varese, when he first began his professional career. After his retirement, he returned to the town, where he remained until his death.

== Death ==
Anastasi died in Varese on 17 January 2020 at the age of 71, having been diagnosed with amyotrophic lateral sclerosis in 2018. During the last three years of his life, medical examinations also found that he had an intestinal tumour, which was removed through an operation.

== Honours ==
Juventus

- Serie A: 1971–72, 1972–73, 1974–75
- Intercontinental Cup: runner-up: 1973
- European Cup: runner-up: 1972–73
- Inter-Cities Fairs Cup runner-up: 1970–71

Inter

- Coppa Italia: 1977–78

Italy

- UEFA European Championship: 1968

Individual

- Coppa Italia Top Goalscorer: 1974–75
- Inter-Cities Fairs Cup Top Scorer: 1970–71
- Italian Football Hall of Fame: 2019
- Juventus FC Hall of Fame: 2025
