= Roberto Tancredi =

Italian footballer

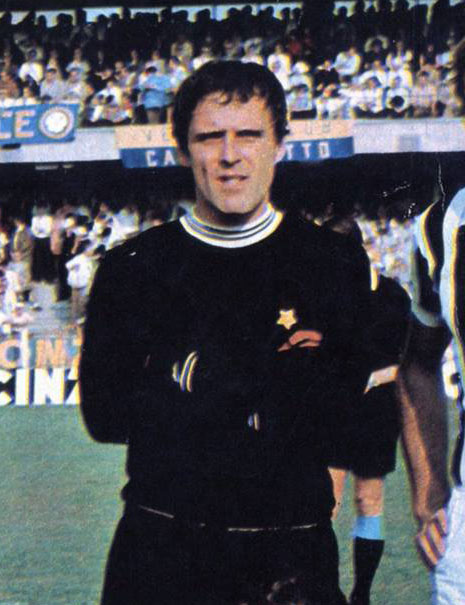
- Tancredi with Juventus in 1970

Personal information
- Date of birth: 30 January 1944 (age 82)
- Place of birth: Montecatini Val di Cecina, Italy
- Height: 1.72 m (5 ft 7 1/2 in)
- Position: Goalkeeper

Senior career*
Years	Team	Apps	(Gls)
1964–1971	Juventus	48	(0)
1964–1965	→ Siracusa (loan)	26	(0)
1965–1966	→ Potenza (loan)	20	(0)
1966–1968	→ Sambenedettese (loan)	63	(0)
1971–1972	Mantova	16	(0)
1972–1973	Ternana	6	(0)
1972–1975	Brescia	5	(0)
1975–1976	Livorno	14	(0)
- * Club domestic league appearances and goals

Roberto Tancredi (born 30 January 1944 in Montecatini Val di Cecina) is a retired Italian professional football player who played as a goalkeeper.

== Career ==
Tancredi began playing youth football with local side Rosignano before joining Juventus FC He played in Serie A for Juventus, and finished his career with A.S. Livorno Calcio.
