= 1972–73 Serie A =

70th season of top-tier Italian football

Serie A
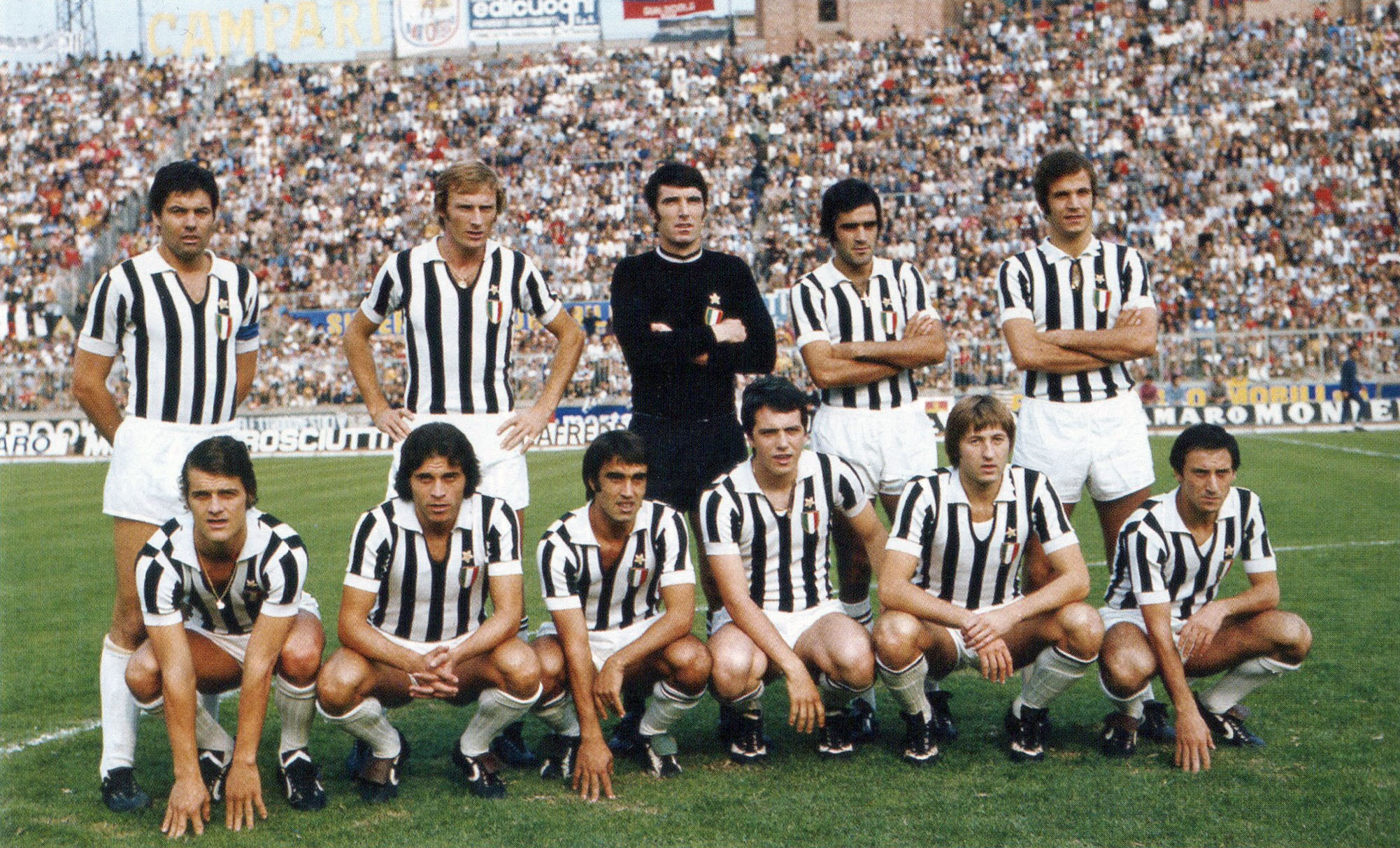
- 1972–73 Juventus team posing for a photograph
- Season: 1972–73
- Dates: 24 September 1972 – 20 May 1973
- Champions: Juventus; 15th title
- Relegated: Atalanta; Palermo; Ternana
- European Cup: Juventus
- Cup Winners' Cup: Milan
- UEFA Cup: Lazio; Fiorentina; Internazionale; Torino
- Matches: 240
- Goals: 449 (1.87 per match)
- Top goalscorer: Gianni Rivera; Giuseppe Savoldi; Paolo Pulici (17 goals each)

Serie A 1972-73 team distribution

The 1972–73 Serie A season was won by Juventus.

== Teams ==
Ternana, Lazio and Palermo had been promoted from Serie B.

== Final classification ==
Pos	Team	Pld	W	D	L	GF	GA	GD	Pts	Qualification or relegation
1	Juventus (C)	30	18	9	3	45	22	+23	45	Qualification to European Cup
2	Milan	30	18	8	4	65	33	+32	44	Qualification to Cup Winners' Cup
3	Lazio	30	16	11	3	33	16	+17	43	Qualification to UEFA Cup
4	Fiorentina	30	16	5	9	39	26	+13	37	Qualification to UEFA Cup
5	Internazionale	30	15	7	8	32	23	+9	37	Qualification to UEFA Cup
6	Torino	30	11	9	10	33	21	+12	31	Qualification to UEFA Cup
7	Bologna	30	11	9	10	33	31	+2	31	
8	Cagliari	30	9	11	10	26	28	−2	29	
9	Napoli	30	7	14	9	18	20	−2	28	
10	Hellas Verona	30	5	16	9	28	34	−6	26	
11	Roma	30	6	12	12	23	28	−5	24	
12	Sampdoria	30	5	14	11	16	25	−9	24	
13	Vicenza	30	7	10	13	15	31	−16	24	
14	Atalanta (R)	30	5	14	11	16	33	−17	24	Relegation to Serie B
15	Palermo (R)	30	3	11	16	13	41	−28	17	Relegation to Serie B
16	Ternana (R)	30	3	10	17	14	37	−23	16	Relegation to Serie B

Source: Panini
(C) Champions; (R) Relegated

== Results ==
Home \ Away	ATA	BOL	CAG	FIO	INT	JUV	LRV	LAZ	MIL	NAP	PAL	ROM	SAM	TER	TOR	HEL
Atalanta		1–0	0–0	1–1	0–0	0–2	0–1	1–1	1–1	0–0	1–0	1–0	0–2	0–0	1–0	0–1
Bologna	1–0		4–2	2–0	1–0	0–2	0–0	1–1	3–2	2–0	3–0	1–3	1–1	3–0	1–0	4–1
Cagliari	0–0	1–0		2–2	2–3	0–1	3–0	0–1	0–1	1–0	2–0	2–2	1–0	1–0	1–0	1–1
Fiorentina	4–0	3–0	3–0		1–2	2–1	1–0	0–1	3–1	1–0	3–0	2–1	2–0	2–1	0–0	2–0
Internazionale	0–0	0–0	1–0	1–0		0–2	1–2	1–1	0–2	2–0	3–1	0–0	0–0	4–0	2–0	1–0
Juventus	0–0	2–0	2–0	2–1	2–1		3–2	1–0	2–2	0–0	4–1	1–0	1–1	2–0	0–2	1–1
Vicenza	1–1	0–0	1–0	0–1	0–1	0–2		1–2	0–3	1–0	1–1	0–0	0–0	1–0	1–0	2–2
Lazio	2–1	0–0	2–1	0–0	0–0	1–1	1–0		2–1	3–0	2–0	2–0	1–0	2–1	0–0	2–1
Milan	9–3	3–1	1–1	2–0	3–2	2–2	2–0	3–1		1–0	4–0	3–1	3–1	3–1	1–0	2–1
Napoli	1–0	1–1	1–1	3–0	2–0	1–1	2–0	1–0	0–0		1–1	1–0	0–0	1–0	1–1	1–1
Palermo	1–2	1–1	0–1	1–0	0–2	0–1	0–1	0–2	0–1	1–0		1–1	0–0	1–1	2–1	0–0
Roma	2–0	0–1	0–0	1–1	0–2	1–2	0–0	0–1	0–0	1–0	0–0		3–1	0–0	1–0	0–1
Sampdoria	0–0	2–1	0–1	0–1	0–1	0–1	0–0	0–0	1–4	1–1	0–0	0–0		0–0	2–1	0–1
Ternana	0–0	2–0	1–1	0–1	0–1	2–3	2–0	0–1	0–0	0–0	0–0	1–4	0–2		0–0	2–1
Torino	2–1	3–1	0–0	3–0	4–0	2–1	3–0	0–0	2–2	0–0	2–0	2–0	0–1	2–0		3–2
Hellas Verona	1–1	0–0	1–1	1–2	0–1	0–0	0–0	1–1	5–3	0–0	1–1	2–2	1–1	1–0	0–0	

Source: Almanacco Illustrato del Calcio - La Storia 1898-2004, Panini Edizioni, Modena, September 2005 (in Italian)
Legend: Blue = home team win; Yellow = draw; Red = away team win.

== Top goalscorers ==
Rank	Player	Club	Goals
1	(Italy) Giuseppe Savoldi	Bologna	17
1	(Italy) Paolo Pulici	Torino	17
1	(Italy) Gianni Rivera	Milan	17
4	(Italy) Luciano Chiarugi	Milan	12
4	(Italy) Roberto Boninsegna	Internazionale	12
6	(Italy) Gigi Riva	Cagliari	12
7	(Italy) Giorgio Chinaglia	Lazio	10
7	(Italy) Alberto Bigon	Milan	10
7	(Brazil) Sergio Clerici	Fiorentina	10
10	(Italy) Franco Causio	Juventus	9
11	(Brazil) (Italy) José Altafini	Juventus	8

== Attendances ==
#	Club	Average
1	Milan	53,977
2	Napoli	53,202
3	Lazio	45,591
4	Roma	44,310
5	Juventus	42,813
6	Internazionale	42,426
7	Torino	31,694
8	Fiorentina	31,689
9	Bologna	27,981
10	Cagliari	24,599
11	Hellas Verona	23,225
12	Sampdoria	22,527
13	Atalanta	19,522
14	Ternana	19,159
15	Palermo	16,405
16	Vicenza	15,700

== References and sources ==
- Almanacco Illustrato del Calcio - La Storia 1898-2004, Panini Edizioni, Modena, September 2005
