= 1971–72 Serie A =

69th season of top-tier Italian football

Serie A
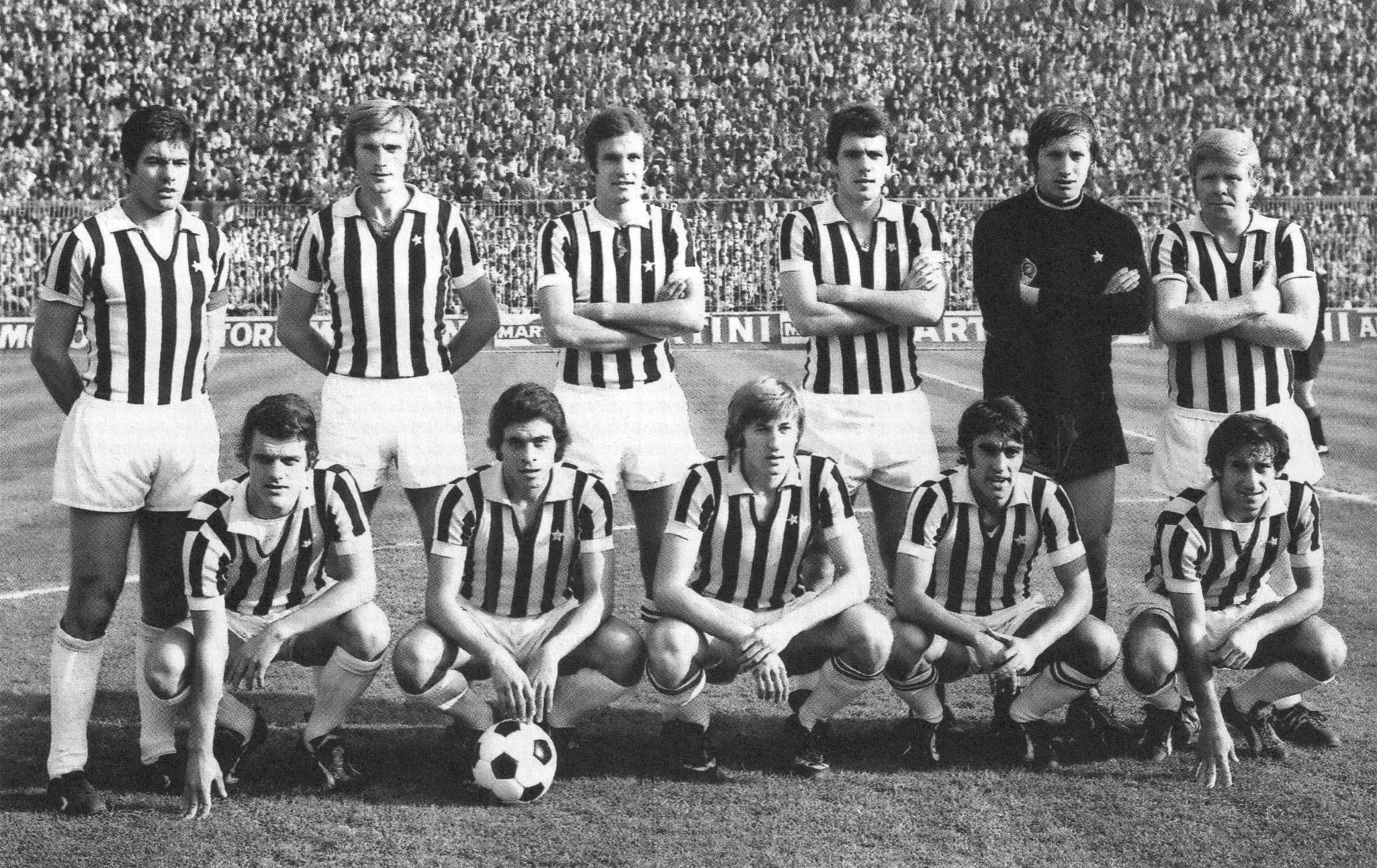
- 1971–72 Juventus team
- Season: 1971–72
- Dates: 3 October 1971 – 28 May 1972
- Champions: Juventus; 14th title
- Relegated: Mantova; Catanzaro; Varese
- European Cup: Juventus
- Cup Winners' Cup: Milan
- UEFA Cup: Torino; Cagliari; Internazionale; Fiorentina
- Matches: 240
- Goals: 483 (2.01 per match)
- Top goalscorer: Roberto Boninsegna (22 goals)

Serie A 1971-72 team distribution

The 1971–72 Serie A season was won by Juventus.

== Teams ==
Mantova, Atalanta and Catanzaro had been promoted from Serie B.

== Final classification ==
Pos	Team	Pld	W	D	L	GF	GA	GD	Pts	Qualification or relegation
1	Juventus (C)	30	17	9	4	48	24	+24	43	Qualification to European Cup
2	Milan	30	16	10	4	36	17	+19	42	Qualification to Cup Winners' Cup
3	Torino	30	17	8	5	39	25	+14	42	Qualification to UEFA Cup
4	Cagliari	30	15	9	6	39	23	+16	39	Qualification to UEFA Cup
5	Internazionale	30	13	10	7	49	28	+21	36	Qualification to UEFA Cup
6	Fiorentina	30	12	12	6	28	20	+8	36	Qualification to UEFA Cup
7	Roma	30	13	9	8	37	31	+6	35	
8	Napoli	30	6	16	8	27	31	−4	28	
9	Sampdoria	30	8	12	10	23	28	−5	28	
10	Atalanta	30	9	8	13	21	26	−5	26	
11	Bologna	30	7	11	12	28	36	−8	25	
12	Vicenza	30	8	7	15	30	43	−13	23	
13	Hellas Verona	30	4	14	12	21	36	−15	22	
14	Mantova (R)	30	6	9	15	23	39	−16	21	Relegation to Serie B
15	Catanzaro (R)	30	3	15	12	17	34	−17	21	Relegation to Serie B
16	Varese (R)	30	1	11	18	17	42	−25	13	Relegation to Serie B

Source: Panini
(C) Champions; (R) Relegated

== Results ==
Home \ Away	ATA	BOL	CAG	CTZ	FIO	INT	JUV	LRV	MAN	MIL	NAP	ROM	SAM	TOR	VAR	HEL
Atalanta		0–0	2–1	1–0	3–1	1–0	0–0	1–3	2–0	0–1	3–1	1–1	0–0	0–0	1–0	0–0
Bologna	1–1		2–1	2–1	1–1	0–3	1–2	2–1	1–1	0–2	2–2	2–2	1–0	2–3	1–0	1–0
Cagliari	2–0	2–1		0–0	0–0	2–1	2–1	3–0	1–0	2–1	2–1	1–0	3–1	1–2	1–1	3–1
Catanzaro	1–1	1–0	2–2		0–2	0–2	1–0	1–1	1–1	0–0	0–0	1–1	1–0	1–3	1–1	0–0
Fiorentina	2–0	2–1	0–1	1–0		0–0	1–1	2–1	0–1	2–0	2–1	2–0	0–0	1–1	1–0	2–1
Internazionale	2–0	1–1	0–0	1–0	1–1		0–0	2–1	2–0	2–3	2–0	2–2	4–4	2–0	2–0	4–1
Juventus	1–0	2–1	2–1	4–2	1–0	3–0		2–0	2–1	1–1	2–2	2–1	3–1	2–1	1–0	4–0
Vicenza	1–0	2–3	0–1	2–0	0–1	0–4	1–3		1–0	0–2	6–2	0–1	1–0	0–0	0–4	2–1
Mantova	1–0	1–1	2–1	1–1	1–2	1–6	1–1	0–1		0–0	0–0	0–2	1–2	1–2	2–2	1–0
Milan	1–0	1–0	0–0	1–0	2–0	1–1	1–4	1–1	0–1		3–0	3–0	0–0	1–0	3–1	2–0
Napoli	2–1	0–0	0–0	0–0	0–0	0–0	1–1	1–1	1–0	0–0		4–0	0–0	1–1	3–0	1–1
Roma	1–0	1–0	2–2	4–0	0–0	3–1	1–1	1–0	3–1	1–2	1–0		1–0	3–1	0–0	1–0
Sampdoria	1–0	2–1	0–0	1–1	0–0	0–0	0–0	1–1	0–0	0–2	1–2	1–0		2–1	2–0	1–0
Torino	1–0	1–0	1–0	1–0	2–1	2–1	2–1	2–1	1–0	0–0	1–0	2–0	2–0		2–0	2–2
Varese	0–1	0–0	0–2	1–1	1–1	0–3	0–1	0–0	2–4	0–1	0–1	1–3	0–1	2–2		0–0
Hellas Verona	1–2	0–0	0–2	0–0	0–0	2–0	1–0	2–2	1–0	1–1	1–1	1–1	3–2	0–0	1–1	

Source: Almanacco Illustrato del Calcio - La Storia 1898-2004, Panini Edizioni, Modena, September 2005 (in Italian)
Legend: Blue = home team win; Yellow = draw; Red = away team win.

== Top goalscorers ==
Rank	Player	Club	Goals
1	(Italy) Roberto Boninsegna	Internazionale	22
2	(Italy) Luigi Riva	Cagliari	20
3	(Italy) Alberto Bigon	Milan	14
4	(Italy) Pietro Anastasi	Juventus	11
4	(Italy) Mario Maraschi	Vicenza	11
4	(Italy) Giuseppe Savoldi	Bologna	11
7	(Brazil) Sergio Clerici	Fiorentina	10
7	(Italy) Roberto Bettega	Juventus	10
9	(Italy) Gianni Bui	Torino	9
9	(Italy) Fabio Capello	Juventus	9

== Attendances ==
#	Club	Average
1	Napoli	53,923
2	Roma	47,990
3	Milan	46,130
4	Juventus	45,667
5	Internazionale	42,630
6	Fiorentina	37,492
7	Cagliari	31,839
8	Torino	31,386
9	Bologna	25,503
10	Sampdoria	21,334
11	Hellas Verona	20,038
12	Atalanta	17,781
13	Vicenza	15,352
14	Catanzaro	14,762
15	Mantova	12,111
16	Varese	9,000

== References and sources ==
- Almanacco Illustrato del Calcio - La Storia 1898-2004, Panini Edizioni, Modena, September 2005
