= 1973–74 AC Milan season =

Milan Associazione Calcio
1973–74 season
- President: Albino Buticchi
- Manager: Cesare Maldini, then Giovanni Trapattoni (with Nereo Rocco as technical director until February 1974)
- Stadium: San Siro
- Serie A: 7th
- Coppa Italia: Second round
- Cup Winners' Cup: Runner-up
- UEFA Super Cup: Runner-up
- Top goalscorer: League: Luciano Chiarugi (11); All: Luciano Chiarugi (17)
- Average home league attendance: 47,466
Home colours	Away colours

During the 1973–1974 season Milan Associazione Calcio competed in Serie A, Coppa Italia, Cup Winners' Cup and European Super Cup.

== Summary ==
The technical director Nereo Rocco was confirmed as technical director of the team at the beginning of the 1973–1974 season, with Cesare Maldini and Giovanni Trapattoni alternating each other as managers. As for the squad, among others, Pierino Prati, Silvano Villa and Roberto Rosato left, while Ottavio Bianchi and Franco Bergamaschi were the main signings.

In the league, Milan remained steadily in the middle-upper area of the table and closed the first half of the season in fifth position, with 18 points. During the second half of the season, Cesare Maldini, who had already joined Rocco on the bench in December starting from the ninth round (December 16, 1973), became the team's sole technical manager and held this role until at the beginning of April when Giovanni Trapattoni took over. This was the first experience as manager for Trapattoni, who retired from football just two seasons earlier. Milan went through a series of negative results (including five defeats in a row) which condemned them to the 7th place in the final standings, totaling 30 points, with 11 wins, 8 draws and 11 defeats.

In January, the Rossoneri, holders of the Cup Winners' Cup, faced the reigning European Cup champions Ajax on the first edition of the UEFA Super Cup. After a 1–0 win in the first leg at San Siro, with a goal of Luciano Chiarugi, Milan were beaten 6–0 in Amsterdam by the Dutch team, which thus won the trophy. In the Coppa Italia Milan, as holder of the trophy, started from the second round, where they were eliminated in a group that included Bologna, Inter and Atalanta, after finishing in third place with five points, as a result of two wins (with Atalanta), a draw (with Bologna) and three defeats.

In the Cup Winners' Cup Milan qualified for the final after eliminating the Yugoslavs of Dinamo Zagreb in the round of 32 (3–1 victory in the first leg in Milan and 1–0 in the second leg in Zagreb), in the round of 16 the Austrians of Rapid Vienna (0–0 at San Siro and 2–0 away victory), in the quarter-finals the Greeks of PAOK (3–0 at home and 2–2 in Thessaloniki) and in the semi-finals the West Germans of Borussia Mönchengladbach (2–0 home win and 1–0 away defeat).[9] In the final, played in Rotterdam on 8 May 1974, Milan, with Trapattoni on the bench, faced the East Germans of Magdeburg, which won the match 2–0 thanks to an own goal by Enrico Lanzi in the first half and goal by Wolfgang Seguin in the second.

== Squad ==
Note: Flags indicate national team as defined under FIFA eligibility rules; some limited exceptions apply. Players may hold more than one non-FIFA nationality.

Pos.	Nation	Player
GK	ITA	Giuseppe Cafaro
GK	ITA	Pier Luigi Pizzaballa
GK	ITA	Villiam Vecchi
DF	ITA	Enrico Lanzi
DF	ITA	Angelo Anquilletti
DF	ITA	Giulio Zignoli
DF	ITA	Dario Dolci
DF	ITA	Franco Fasoli
DF	ITA	Maurizio Turone
DF	ITA	Giuseppe Sabadini
DF	GER	Karl-Heinz Schnellinger (vice-captain)
DF	ITA	Aldo Maldera
MF	ITA	Romeo Benetti
MF	ITA	Giorgio Biasiolo

Pos.	Nation	Player
MF	ITA	Franco Bergamaschi
MF	ITA	Gianni Rivera (Captain)
MF	ITA	Riccardo Sogliano
MF	ITA	Ottavio Bianchi
MF	ITA	Walter De Vecchi
MF	ITA	Ilario Frank
FW	ITA	Luciano Chiarugi
FW	ITA	Lino Golin
FW	ITA	Alberto Bigon
FW	ITA	Emilio Rossi
FW	ITA	Alessandro Turini
FW	ITA	Carlo Tresoldi
FW	ITA	Francesco Vincenzi
FW	ITA	Graziano Gori

== Transfers ==
In
Pos.	Name	from	Type
GK	Giuseppe Cafaro	Platense	
GK	Pier Luigi Pizzaballa	Verona	
DF	Enrico Lanzi	Cesena	loan end
DF	Aldo Maldera	Bologna	loan end
MF	Franco Bergamaschi	Verona	
MF	Ottavio Bianchi	Atalanta	
MF	Ilario Frank	Lecco	
MF	Vincenzo Zazzaro	Lecco	loan end
FW	Alessandro Turini	Como	
FW	Silvano Villa	Sampdoria	loan end

Out
Pos.	Name	To	Type
GK	Pierangelo Belli	Verona	
DF	Roberto Rosato	Genoa	
MF	Roberto Casone	Como	loan
MF	Guido Magherini	Arezzo	
MF	Vincenzo Zazzaro	Reggina	loan
MF	Ilario Frank	Juve Stabia	
FW	Lino Golin	Foggia	
FW	Pierino Prati	Roma	
FW	Silvano Villa	Foggia	loan
FW	Graziano Gori	Spezia	

== Competitions ==
=== Serie A ===
==== League table ====
Pos	Team	Pld	W	D	L	GF	GA	GD	Pts	Qualification or relegation
5	Torino	30	10	14	6	27	24	+3	34	Qualification to UEFA Cup
6	Fiorentina	30	10	13	7	32	26	+6	33	
7	Milan	30	11	8	11	34	36	−2	30	
8	Roma	30	10	9	11	29	28	+1	29	
9	Bologna	30	6	17	7	35	36	−1	29	Qualification to Cup Winners' Cup

Source: Panini

==== Matches ====
7 October 1973 1	Sampdoria	3–2	Milan	Genoa
	Improta 37' (pen.), 45' (pen.); Boni 46'	Report	7' (pen.) Rivera; 51' Chiarugi	Stadium: Stadio Luigi Ferraris; Attendance: 36,038; Referee: Gonella

14 October 1973 2	Milan	1–0	Cesena	Milan
	Chiarugi 50'	Report		Stadium: Stadio San Siro; Attendance: 45,079; Referee: Menegali

28 October 1973 3	Roma	1–2	Milan	Rome
	Cappellini 36'	Report	11' Chiarugi; 20' Bianchi	Stadium: Stadio Olimpico; Attendance: 68,166; Referee: Barbaresco

4 November 1973 4	Milan	2–2	Cagliari	Milan
	Bianchi 17'; Chiarugi 86'	Report	40', 51' Riva	Stadium: Stadio San Siro; Attendance: 48,208; Referee: Reggiani

18 November 1973 5	Lanerossi Vicenza	1–1	Milan	Vicenza
	Longoni 16'	Report	30' Sabadini	Stadium: Stadio Romeo Menti; Attendance: 26,944; Referee: Gialluisi

25 November 1973 6	Milan	2–2	Juventus	Milan
	Rivera 21' (pen.), 87' (pen.)	Report	43', 77' Anastasi	Stadium: Stadio San Siro; Attendance: 80,560; Referee: Lattanzi

2 December 1973 7	Inter Milan	2–1	Milan	Milan
	Boninsegna 14'; Facchetti 70'	Report	40' Benetti	Stadium: Stadio San Siro; Attendance: 79,727; Referee: Serafino

9 December 1973 8	Milan	1–1	Fiorentina	Milan
	Chiarugi 38'	Report	55' Saltutti	Stadium: Stadio San Siro; Attendance: 54,409; Referee: Angonese

16 December 1973 9	Milan	2–1	Hellas Verona	Milan
	Benetti 33'; Bergamaschi 65'	Report	79' Busatta	Stadium: Stadio San Siro; Attendance: 36,497; Referee: Trinchieri

23 December 1973 10	Napoli	1–2	Milan	Naples
	Cané 50'	Report	58' Biasiolo; 68' Chiarugi	Stadium: Stadio San Paolo; Attendance: 83,731; Referee: Menegali

30 December 1973 11	Lazio	1–0	Milan	Rome
	Re Cecconi 90'	Report		Stadium: Stadio Olimpico; Attendance: 68,143; Referee: Ciacci

6 January 1974 12	Milan	1–0	Torino	Milan
	Chiarugi 36'	Report		Stadium: Stadio San Siro; Attendance: 41,279; Referee: Agnolin

13 January 1974 13	Milan	2–0	Genoa	Milan
	Tresoldi 42'; Rivera 58'	Report		Stadium: Stadio San Siro; Attendance: 30,836; Referee: Trono

20 January 1974 14	Bologna	3–2	Milan	Bologna
	Massimelli 42'; Savoldi 49'; Novellini 74'	Report	33' Rivera; 44' Chiarugi	Stadium: Stadio Comunale; Attendance: 44,904; Referee: Panzino

27 January 1974 15	Milan	1–0	Foggia	Milan
	Sabadini 67'	Report		Stadium: Stadio San Siro; Attendance: 37,751; Referee: Angonese

3 February 1974 16	Milan	2–1	Sampdoria	Milan
	Benetti 3'; Chiarugi 42'	Report	35' Badiani	Stadium: Stadio San Siro; Attendance: 27,580; Referee: Calì

10 February 1974 17	Cesena	1–0	Milan	Cesena
	Bertarelli 80'	Report		Stadium: Stadio La Fiorita; Attendance: 35,940; Referee: Menicucci

17 February 1974 18	Milan	2–0	Roma	Milan
	Rivera 8'; Maldera 59'	Report		Stadium: Stadio San Siro; Attendance: 36,523; Referee: Agnolin

2 March 1974 19	Cagliari	0–1	Milan	Cagliari
		Report	67' Benetti	Stadium: Stadio Sant'Elia; Attendance: 44,942; Referee: Barbaresco

10 March 1974 20	Milan	1–2	Lanerossi Vicenza	Milan
	Sabadini 63'	Report	23' Faloppa; 66' Damiani	Stadium: Stadio San Siro; Attendance: 45,712; Referee: Trono

17 March 1974 21	Juventus	2–0	Milan	Turin
	Anastasi 46'; Altafini 79'	Report		Stadium: Stadio Comunale; Attendance: 62,947; Referee: Menegali

24 March 1974 22	Milan	1–5	Inter Milan	Milan
	Chiarugi 20'	Report	5' Oriali; 7' (o.g.) Sabadini; 9' Boninsegna; 44' Mazzola; 69' Mariani	Stadium: Stadio San Siro; Attendance: 79,829; Referee: Angonese

31 March 1974 23	Fiorentina	3–2	Milan	Florence
	Saltutti 34'; Roggi 42'; Antognoni 75'	Report	40' Biasiolo; 76' Benetti	Stadium: Stadio Comunale; Attendance: 38,977; Referee: Serafino

6 April 1974 24	Hellas Verona	2–1	Milan	Verona
	Sogliano 26' (o.g.); Zaccarelli 41' (pen.)	Report	88' Turini	Stadium: Stadio Marcantonio Bentegodi; Attendance: 35,096; Referee: Gialluisi

14 April 1974 25	Milan	0–0	Napoli	Milan
		Report		Stadium: Stadio San Siro; Attendance: 46,474; Referee: Gonella

21 April 1974 26	Milan	0–0	Lazio	Milan
		Report		Stadium: Stadio San Siro; Attendance: 63,096; Referee: Picasso

28 April 1974 27	Torino	1–0	Milan	Turin
	Pulici 16' (pen.)	Report		Stadium: Stadio Comunale; Attendance: 26,338; Referee: Levrero

4 May 1974 28	Genoa	0–1	Milan	Lucca
		Report	45' Chiarugi	Stadium: Stadio Porta Elisa; Attendance: 18,649; Referee: Lattanzi

12 May 1974 29	Milan	1–1	Bologna	Milan
	Bigon 2'	Report	55' Novellini	Stadium: Stadio San Siro; Attendance: 33,853; Referee: Lenardon

19 May 1974 30	Foggia	0–0	Milan	Foggia
		Report		Stadium: Stadio Pino Zaccheria; Attendance: 22,438; Referee: Menicucci

=== Coppa Italia ===
==== Second round ====
12 December 1973 1	Bologna	1–0	Milan	Bologna
	Savoldi 69'			Stadium: Stadio Comunale; Attendance: 14,394; Referee: Toselli

23 January 1974 2	Milan	0–1	Inter Milan	Milan
			77' Boninsegna	Stadium: Stadio San Siro; Attendance: 19,008; Referee: Gussoni

6 February 1974 3	Milan	2–1	Atalanta	Milan
	Benetti 46'; Bigon 81'		23' Vignando	Stadium: Stadio San Siro; Attendance: 1,543; Referee: Lenardon

20 February 1974 4	Atalanta	2–4	Milan	Bergamo
	Divina 5'; Vianello 89'		3' Chiarugi; 21' Rivera; 52' Bergamaschi; 76' Bigon	Stadium: Stadio Comunale; Attendance: 5,183; Referee: Martinelli

27 March 1974 5	Milan	1–1	Bologna	Milan
	Cresci 28' (o.g.)		14' Novellini	Stadium: Stadio San Siro; Attendance: 6,000; Referee: Moretto

1 May 1974 6	Inter Milan	2–1	Milan	Milan
	Boninsegna 10'; Mazzola 23'		56' Sabadini	Stadium: Stadio San Siro; Attendance: 22,642; Referee: Casarin

=== Cup Winners' Cup ===
==== Round of 32 ====
19 September 1973 1	Milan	3–1	Dinamo Zagreb	Milan
	Bigon 10', 53'; Chiarugi 16'		70' Lalić	Stadium: Stadio San Siro; Attendance: 47,428; Referee: Eschweiler

3 October 1973 2	Dinamo Zagreb	0–1	Milan	Zagreb
			7' Chiarugi	Stadium: Stadio Maksimir; Attendance: 37,500; Referee: Kessler

==== Round of 16 ====
24 October 1973 1	Milan	0–0	Rapid Wien	Milan
				Stadium: Stadio San Siro; Attendance: 17,896; Referee: Mackenzie

7 November 1973 2	Rapid Wien	0–2	Milan	Vienna
			26', 41' Bigon	Stadium: Pfarrwiese; Attendance: 3,500; Referee: Kazakov

==== Quarter-finals ====
13 March 1974 1	Milan	3–0	PAOK	Milan
	Bigon 18'; Benetti 38'; Chiarugi 86'			Stadium: Stadio San Siro; Attendance: 25,993; Referee: Bonnet

20 March 1974 2	PAOK	2–2	Milan	Thessaloniki
	Sarafis 29', 72'		54' Bigon; 78' Tresoldi	Stadium: Toumba Stadium; Attendance: 47,500; Referee: Loraux

==== Semi-finals ====
10 April 1974 1	Milan	2–0	Borussia Mönchengladbach	Milan
	Bigon 18'; Chiarugi 58'			Stadium: Stadio San Siro; Attendance: 60,671; Referee: Linemayr

24 April 1974 2	Borussia Mönchengladbach	1–0	Milan	Düsseldorf
	Sabadini 28' (o.g.)			Stadium: Rheinstadion; Attendance: 70,000; Referee: Martínez

==== Final ====
8 May 1974	1. FC Magdeburg	2–0	Milan	Rotterdam
	Lanzi 42' (o.g.); Seguin 75'			Stadium: Stadion Feijenoord; Attendance: 6,461; Referee: van Gemert

=== UEFA Super Cup ===
9 January 1974 1	Milan	1–0	Ajax	Milan
13:30	Chiarugi 77'	Report		Stadium: San Siro; Attendance: 12,856; Referee: Scheurer

16 January 1974 2	Ajax	6–0	Milan	Amsterdam
20:15	Mulder 26'; Keizer 35'; Neeskens 71'; Rep 81'; Mühren 84' (pen.); Haan 87'	Report		Stadium: Olympic Stadium; Attendance: 40,000; Referee: Glöckner

== Statistics ==
=== Squad statistics ===
Competition	Points	Home						Away						Total						GD
Competition	Points	G	W	D	L	Gs	Ga	G	W	D	L	Gs	Ga	G	W	D	L	Gs	Ga	GD
1973-74 Serie A	30	15	7	6	2	19	15	15	4	2	9	15	21	30	11	8	11	34	36	−2
1973-74 Coppa Italia	–	3	1	1	1	3	3	3	1	0	2	5	5	6	2	1	3	8	8	0
1973–74 Cup Winners' Cup	–	4	3	1	0	8	1	4	2	1	1	5	3	9	5	2	2	13	6	+7
1973 European Super Cup	–	1	1	0	0	1	0	1	0	0	1	0	6	2	1	0	1	1	6	−5
Total	–	23	12	8	3	31	19	23	7	3	13	25	35	47	19	11	17	56	56	0

=== Players statistics ===
No.	Pos	Nat	Player	Total		Serie A		Coppa Italia		Cup Winners' Cup		European Super Cup	
No.	Pos	Nat	Player	Apps	Goals	Apps	Goals	Apps	Goals	Apps	Goals	Apps	Goals
	DF	(Italy) ITA	Angelo Anquilletti	43	0	29	0	3	0	9	0	2	0
	DF	(Italy) ITA	Dario Dolci	14	0	7	0	3	0	3	0	1	0
	GK	(Italy) ITA	Giuseppe Cafaro	1	-2	0	-0	1	-2	0	-0	0	-0
	DF	(Italy) ITA	Giuseppe Sabadini	40	4	26	3	5	1	7	0	2	0
	GK	(Italy) ITA	Pier Luigi Pizzaballa	16	-19	10	-13	3	-3	3	-3	0	-0
	MF	(Italy) ITA	Giorgio Biasiolo	35	2	26	2	2	0	5	0	2	0
	MF	(Italy) ITA	Franco Bergamaschi	30	2	18	1	3	1	8	0	1	0
	MF	(Italy) ITA	Ottavio Bianchi	24	2	14	2	5	0	5	0	0	0
	MF	(Italy) ITA	Walter De Vecchi	1	0	1	0	0	0	0	0	0	0
	FW	(Italy) ITA	Alberto Bigon	33	10	22	1	2	2	9	7	0	0
	FW	(Italy) ITA	Graziano Gori	0	0	0	0	0	0	0	0	0	0
	DF	(Italy) ITA	Romeo Benetti	42	7	26	5	6	1	8	1	2	0
	DF	(Italy) ITA	Franco Fasoli	1	0	0	0	1	0	0	0	0	0
	DF	(Italy) ITA	Giulio Zignoli	22	0	14	0	4	0	4	0	0	0
	DF	(Italy) ITA	Enrico Lanzi	12	0	5	0	4	0	3	0	0	0
	MF	(Italy) ITA	Gianni Rivera	39	7	26	6	5	1	6	0	2	0
	DF	(Italy) ITA	Maurizio Turone	25	0	19	0	2	0	2	0	2	0
	FW	(Italy) ITA	Luciano Chiarugi	42	17	28	11	5	1	7	4	2	1
	DF	(Germany) GER	Karl-Heinz Schnellinger	25	0	13	0	3	0	7	0	2	0
	MF	(Italy) ITA	Riccardo Sogliano	14	0	12	0	2	0	0	0	0	0
	DF	(Italy) ITA	Aldo Maldera	29	0	18	0	4	0	5	0	2	0
	FW	(Italy) ITA	Emilio Rossi	1	0	0	0	1	0	0	0	0	0
	FW	(Italy) ITA	Alessandro Turini	15	1	5	1	5	0	4	0	1	0
	FW	(Italy) ITA	Francesco Vincenzi	3	0	1	0	2	0	0	0	0	0
	FW	(Italy) ITA	Carlo Tresoldi	18	2	11	1	3	0	3	1	1	0
	GK	(Italy) ITA	Villiam Vecchi	30	-35	20	-23	2	-3	6	-3	2	-6

== See also ==
- AC Milan

== Bibliography ==
- Almanacco illustrato del Milan, ed: 2, March 2005. Panini.
- Enrico Tosi. La storia del Milan, May 2005. Italia/Italy cid Tosi.
- Milan. Sempre con te, December 2009. Mondadori. 2009. ISBN 978-88-04-59118-4.
