= 1973 European Super Cup =

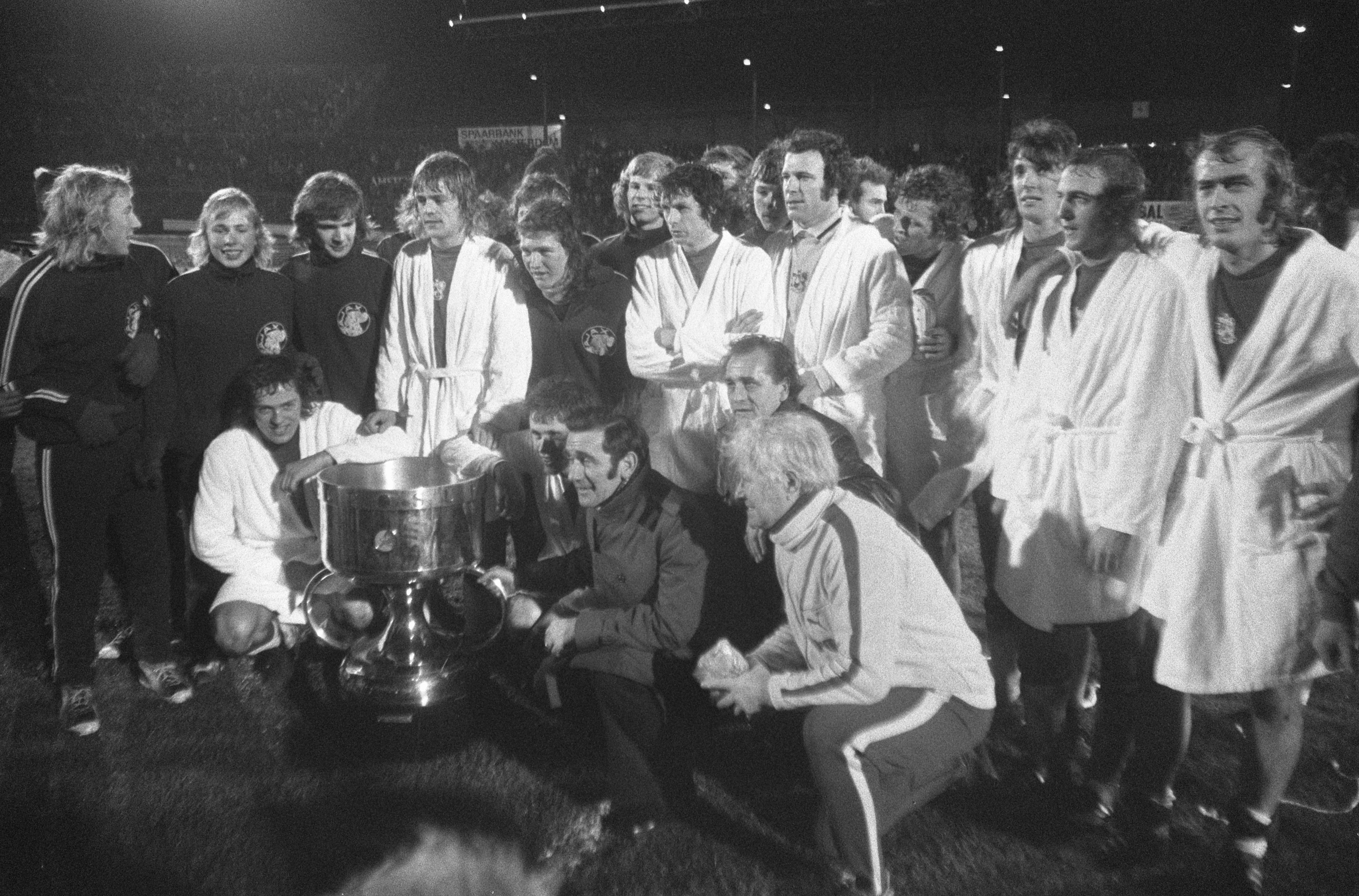
- Ajax celebration
Milan	Ajax
(Italy)	(Netherlands)
1	6
- on aggregate

First leg
Milan	Ajax
1	0
- Date: 9 January 1974
- Venue: San Siro, Milan
- Referee: Rudolf Scheurer (Switzerland)
- Attendance: 12,856

Second leg
Ajax	Milan
6	0
- Date: 16 January 1974
- Venue: Olympisch Stadion, Amsterdam
- Referee: Rudi Glöckner (East Germany)
- Attendance: 15,350

The 1973 European Super Cup (it was named the Super Competition at that time) was played between 1972–73 European Cup winners Ajax and 1972–73 European Cup Winners' Cup winners Milan, with Ajax winning 6–1 on aggregate, making it the worst defeat for an Italian team in an UEFA competition final. Unlike future Super Cup matches, the 1973 edition took place at the start of the following calendar year rather than the start of the following season.

== First leg ==
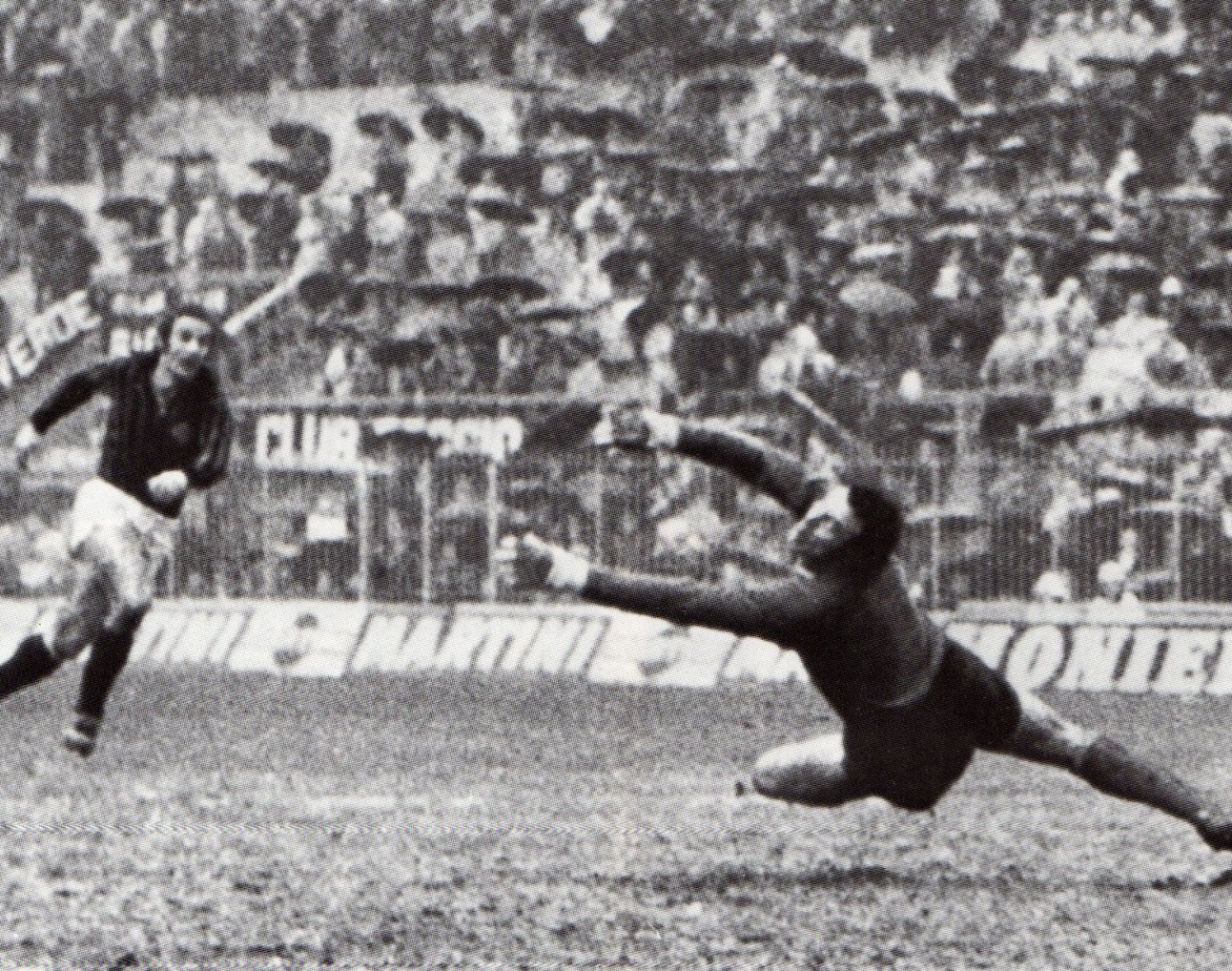
San Siro: Chiarugi scoring 1–0, Ajax goalkeeper Stuy couln’t save.

9 January 1974

Milan (Italy)	1–0	(Netherlands) Ajax
Chiarugi 77'	Report

San Siro, Milan
Attendance: 12,856
Referee: Rudolf Scheurer (Switzerland)

Milan	Ajax

GK	1	(Italy) Villiam Vecchi
DF	2	(Italy) Giuseppe Sabadini
DF	3	(Italy) Aldo Maldera
DF	4	(Italy) Angelo Anquilletti
DF	5	(West Germany) Karl-Heinz Schnellinger
DF	6	(Italy) Maurizio Turone
MF	7	(Italy) Alessandro Turini	(substituted off) 46'
MF	8	(Italy) Romeo Benetti
MF	9	(Italy) Gianni Rivera (c)
MF	10	(Italy) Giorgio Biasiolo
FW	11	(Italy) Luciano Chiarugi
Substitutes:
GK	12	(Italy) Pierluigi Pizzaballa
MF	13	(Italy) Dario Dolci
MF	14	(Italy) Franco Bergamaschi	(substituted on) 46'
DF	15	(Italy) Giulio Zignoli
DF	16	(Italy) Enrico Lanzi
Manager:
(Italy) Cesare Maldini

GK	1	(Netherlands) Heinz Stuy
RB	2	(Netherlands) Wim Suurbier
CB	3	(West Germany) Horst Blankenburg
CB	4	(Netherlands) Barry Hulshoff
LB	5	(Netherlands) Ruud Krol
DM	6	(Netherlands) Arie Haan
CM	7	(Netherlands) Johan Neeskens
CF	8	(Netherlands) Jan Mulder
RF	9	(Netherlands) Johnny Rep
CM	10	(Netherlands) Gerrie Mühren
LF	11	(Netherlands) Piet Keizer (c)
Substitutes:
FW	12	(Germany) Arno Steffenhagen
MF	13	(Hungary) Zoltán Varga
DF	14	(Netherlands) Pim van Dord
MF	15	(Netherlands) Arnold Mühren
GK	16	(Netherlands) Sies Wever
Manager:
(Netherlands) George Knobel

== Second leg ==
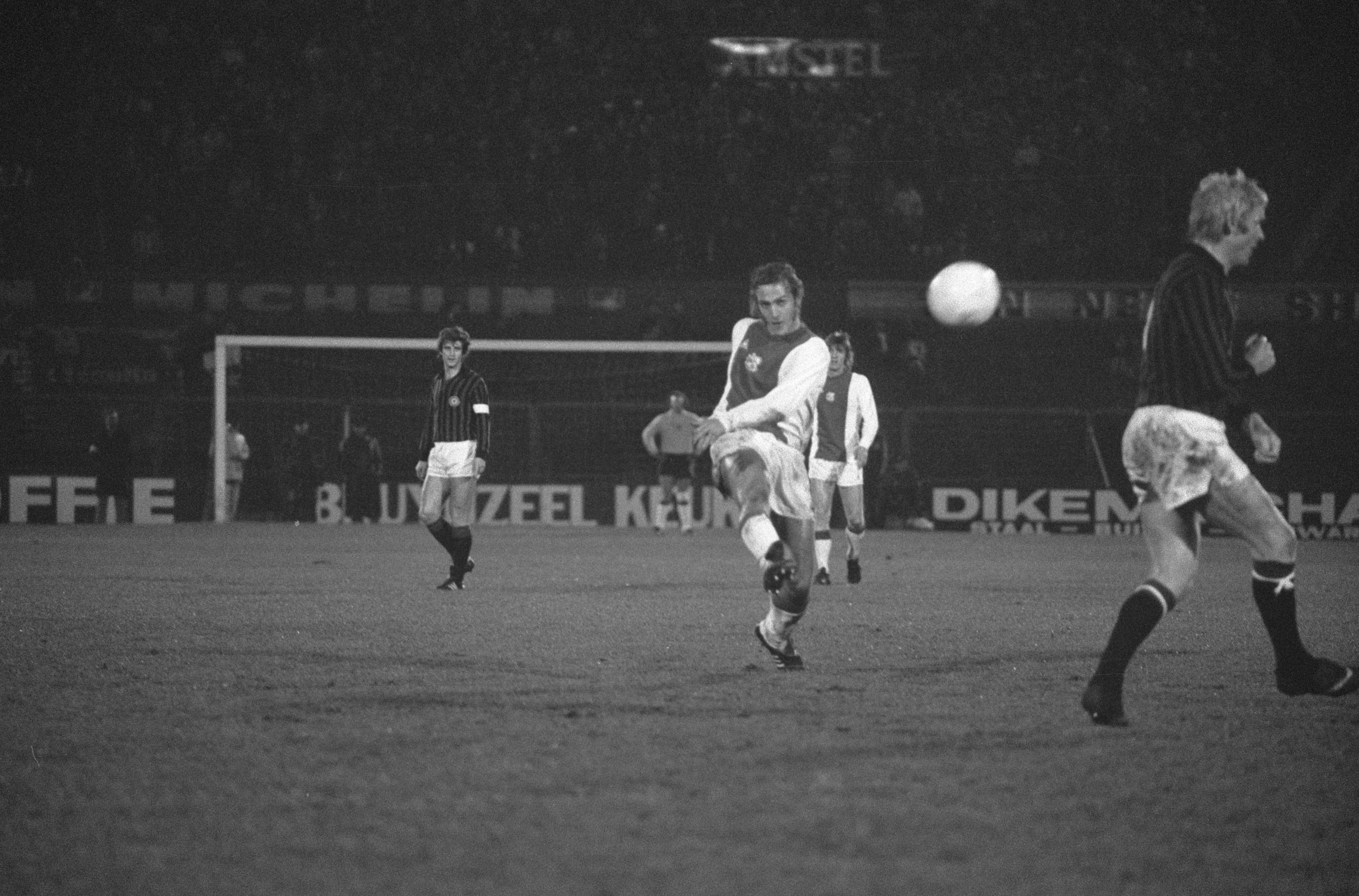
Neeskens shoots on goal

16 January 1974

Ajax (Netherlands)	6–0	(Italy) Milan
Mulder 26'; Keizer 35'; Neeskens 71'; Rep 81'; G. Mühren 84' (pen.); Haan 87'	Report

Olympisch Stadion, Amsterdam
Attendance: 15,350
Referee: Rudi Glöckner (East Germany)

Ajax	Milan

GK	1	(Netherlands) Heinz Stuy
RB	2	(Netherlands) Wim Suurbier
CB	3	(Netherlands) Barry Hulshoff
CB	4	(West Germany) Horst Blankenburg
LB	5	(Netherlands) Ruud Krol
DM	6	(Netherlands) Arie Haan
CM	7	(Netherlands) Johan Neeskens
CF	8	(Netherlands) Jan Mulder
RF	9	(Netherlands) Johnny Rep
CM	10	(Netherlands) Gerrie Mühren
LF	11	(Netherlands) Piet Keizer (c)
Substitutes:
FW	12	(Germany) Arno Steffenhagen
MF	13	(Hungary) Zoltán Varga
DF	14	(Netherlands) Pim van Dord
MF	15	(Netherlands) Arnold Mühren
GK	16	(Netherlands) Sies Wever
Manager:
(Netherlands) George Knobel

GK	1	(Italy) Villiam Vecchi
DF	2	(Italy) Angelo Anquilletti
DF	3	(Italy) Aldo Maldera
MF	4	(Italy) Dario Dolci
DF	5	(West Germany) Karl-Heinz Schnellinger
DF	6	(Italy) Maurizio Turone
DF	7	(Italy) Giuseppe Sabadini
MF	8	(Italy) Romeo Benetti
MF	9	(Italy) Gianni Rivera (c)
MF	10	(Italy) Giorgio Biasiolo	(substituted off) 71'
FW	11	(Italy) Luciano Chiarugi
Substitutes:
GK	12	(Italy) Pierluigi Pizzaballa
DF	13	(Italy) Giulio Zignoli
MF	14	(Italy) Franco Bergamaschi
DF	15	(Italy) Enrico Lanzi
FW	16	(Italy) Carlo Tresoldi	(substituted on) 71'
Manager:
(Italy) Cesare Maldini

== See also ==
- 1973 European Cup Final
- 1973 European Cup Winners' Cup Final
- 1973–74 European Cup
- 1973–74 European Cup Winners' Cup
- 1973–74 AC Milan season
- AC Milan in international football
- AFC Ajax in international football
