= 1974 Coppa Italia final =

26th Coppa Italia final
- Event: 1973–74 Coppa Italia
Bologna	Palermo
1	1
- After extra time Bologna won 4–3 on penalties
- Date: 23 May 1974
- Venue: Stadio Olimpico, Rome
- Referee: Sergio Gonella Cervo
- Attendance: 18,000

The 1974 Coppa Italia final was the final of the 1973–74 Coppa Italia. The match was played on 23 May 1974 between Bologna and Palermo. Bologna won 4–3 on penalty kicks after the match ended 1–1 following extra time. It was Bologna's second final and second victory. The match was officiated by referee Sergio Gonella, who was later criticised in the Italian media over his performance, and was even accused by some pundits of demonstrating clear favourtism towards Bologna, to the detriment of Palermo. He awarded Giacomo Bulgarelli a penalty in the 90th minute of play, which was later converted by Giuseppe Savoldi to tie the game. In the shoot-out, when Bulgarelli had initially missed Bologna's first penalty, Gonella had him retake it, because he believed that Palermo's goalkeeper Sergio Girardi had moved too soon; Bulgarelli scored his second attempt, and Bologna eventually won the shoot-out.

== Match ==
23 May 1974
16:30

Bologna	1–1 (a.e.t.)	Palermo
G. Savoldi 90' (pen.)		Magistrelli 32'
Penalties
Bulgarelli (penalty scored); Cresci (penalty missed); G. Savoldi (penalty scored); Novellini (penalty scored); Pecci (penalty scored)	4–3	(penalty scored) Vanello; (penalty scored) Magistrelli; (penalty scored) Barbana; (penalty missed) Vullo; (penalty missed) E.Favalli

Stadio Olimpico, Rome
Attendance: 18,000
Referee: Sergio Gonella Cervo

Bologna	Palermo

GK	1	(Italy) Sergio Buso
DF	2	(Italy) Franco Battisodo
DF	3	(Italy) Franco Cresci
DF	4	(Italy) Angelo Rimbano	(substituted off) 76'
DF	5	(Italy) Tazio Roversi
MF	6	(Italy) Giacomo Bulgarelli
MF	7	(Italy) Pierino Ghetti
MF	8	(Italy) Ivan Gregori	(substituted off) 46'
MF	9	(Italy) Roberto Vieri
CF	10	(Italy) Fausto Landini
CF	11	(Italy) Giuseppe Savoldi (c)
Substitutes:
MF		(Italy) Adriano Novellini	(substituted on) 46'
MF		(Italy) Eraldo Pecci	(substituted on) 76'
Manager:
(Argentina) (Italy) Bruno Pesaola

GK	1	(Italy) Sergio Girardi
DF	2	(Italy) Aldo Cerantola
DF	3	(Italy) Dario Pighin
DF	4	(Italy) Alessandro Zanin
MF	5	(Italy) Ignazio Arcoleo
MF	6	(Italy) Sandro Vanello
RW	7	(Italy) Arturo Ballabio	(substituted off) 61'
CF	8	(Italy) Lorenzo Barlassina
CF	9	(Italy) Erminio Favalli (c)
CF	10	(Italy) Giacomo La Rosa	(substituted off) 46'
LW	11	(Italy) Sergio Magistrelli
Substitutes:
MF		(Italy) Giorgio Barbana	(substituted on) 46'
MF		(Italy) Salvatore Vullo	(substituted on) 61'
Manager:
(Italy) Corrado Viciani
