= 1974 European Cup Winners' Cup final =

- Match programme cover
- Event: 1973–74 European Cup Winners' Cup
Magdeburg	Milan
(East Germany)	(Italy)
2	0
- Date: 8 May 1974
- Venue: Feyenoord Stadion, Rotterdam
- Referee: Arie van Gemert (Netherlands)
- Attendance: 4,641

The 1974 European Cup Winners' Cup Final was a football match of the 1973–74 European Cup Winners' Cup and the 14th European Cup Winners' Cup final. It was contested between Magdeburg of East Germany and the defending champions, Milan of Italy, and was held at Feijenoord Stadion in Rotterdam, Netherlands. Magdeburg won the match 2–0 thanks to goals by Enrico Lanzi (own goal) and Wolfgang Seguin. It was the only time one of the major European trophies was won by an East German club.

== Route to the final ==
(East Germany) Magdeburg					(Italy) Milan			
Opponent	Agg.	1st leg	2nd leg		Opponent	Agg.	1st leg	2nd leg
(Netherlands) NAC Breda	2–0	0–0 (A)	2–0 (H)	First round	(Socialist Federal Republic of Yugoslavia) Dinamo Zagreb	4–1	3–1 (H)	1–0 (A)
(Czechoslovakia) Baník Ostrava	3–2	0–2 (A)	3–0 (H)	Second round	(Austria) Rapid Wien	2–0	0–0 (H)	2–0 (A)
(Bulgaria) Beroe Stara Zagora	1–0	0–0 (A)	1–0 (H)	Quarter-finals	(Greece) PAOK	5–2	3–0 (H)	2–2 (A)
(Portugal) Sporting CP	3–2	1–1 (A)	2–1 (H)	Semi-finals	(West Germany) Borussia Mönchengladbach	3–1	2–0 (H)	1–1 (A)

== Match ==
=== Details ===
8 May 1974
20:30 CEST

Magdeburg (East Germany)	2–0	(Italy) Milan
Lanzi 42' (o.g.); Seguin 74'	Report

Feijenoord Stadion, Rotterdam
Attendance: 4,641
Referee: Arie van Gemert (Netherlands)

Magdeburg	Milan

GK	1	(East Germany) Ulrich Schulze
SW	3	(East Germany) Manfred Zapf (c)
RB	8	(East Germany) Axel Tyll
CB	5	(East Germany) Wolfgang Abraham
LB	2	(East Germany) Detlef Enge
CM	6	(East Germany) Jürgen Pommerenke
DM	4	(East Germany) Helmut Gaube
CM	7	(East Germany) Wolfgang Seguin
AM	9	(East Germany) Detlef Raugust
CF	10	(East Germany) Jürgen Sparwasser
CF	11	(East Germany) Martin Hoffmann
Substitutes:
GK	12	(East Germany) Hans-Werner Heine
FW	13	(East Germany) Hans-Jürgen Hermann
MF	14	(East Germany) Siegmund Mewes
DF	15	(East Germany) Jörg Ohm
Manager:
(East Germany) Heinz Krügel

GK	1	(Italy) Pierluigi Pizzaballa
SW	5	(West Germany) Karl-Heinz Schnellinger
RB	2	(Italy) Angelo Anquilletti
CB	4	(Italy) Enrico Lanzi
LB	3	(Italy) Giuseppe Sabadini
CM	6	(Italy) Aldo Maldera
CM	8	(Italy) Romeo Benetti
RW	10	(Italy) Gianni Rivera (c)
LW	11	(Italy) Franco Bergamaschi	(substituted off) 60'
SS	7	(Italy) Carlo Tresoldi
CF	9	(Italy) Alberto Bigon
Substitutes:
GK	12	(Italy) Villiam Vecchi
MF	13	(Italy) Ottavio Bianchi
MF	14	(Italy) Giorgio Biasiolo
DF	15	(Italy) Dario Dolci
LW	16	(Italy) Alessandro Turini	(substituted on) 60'
Manager:
(Italy) Giovanni Trapattoni

Assistant referees:
Charles Corver (Netherlands)
Henk Pijper (Netherlands)

== See also ==
- 1973–74 European Cup Winners' Cup
- 1974 European Cup Final
- 1974 UEFA Cup Final
- A.C. Milan in European football
