= 1973–74 Coppa Italia =

Tournament details
- Country: Italy
- Dates: 29 Aug 1973 – 23 May 1974
- Teams: 36

Final positions
- Champions: Bologna (2nd title)
- Runners-up: Palermo

Tournament statistics
- Matches played: 95
- Goals scored: 208 (2.19 per match)
- Top goal scorer: Giuseppe Savoldi (10 goals)

The 1973–74 Coppa Italia was the 27th Coppa Italia, the major Italian domestic cup. The competition was won by Bologna.

== First round ==
=== Group 1 ===
Pos	Team	Pld	W	D	L	GF	GA	GD	Pts
1	Juventus	4	4	0	0	13	1	+12	8
2	SPAL	4	3	0	1	7	8	−1	6
3	Ascoli	4	2	0	2	4	5	−1	4
4	Foggia	4	0	1	3	0	3	−3	1
5	Arezzo	4	0	1	3	2	9	−7	1

=== Group 2 ===
Pos	Team	Pld	W	D	L	GF	GA	GD	Pts
1	Lazio	4	2	1	1	7	2	+5	5
2	Brescia	4	1	3	0	5	3	+2	5
3	Varese	4	1	2	1	4	4	0	4
4	Roma	4	0	4	0	1	1	0	4
5	Novara	4	0	2	2	1	8	−7	2

=== Group 3 ===
Pos	Team	Pld	W	D	L	GF	GA	GD	Pts
1	Palermo	4	2	2	0	4	1	+3	6
2	Bari	4	1	3	0	6	4	+2	5
3	Fiorentina	4	1	2	1	7	5	+2	4
4	Hellas Verona	4	1	2	1	4	4	0	3 (Note: 1 point deducted.)
5	Perugia	4	0	1	3	2	9	−7	1

=== Group 4 ===
Pos	Team	Pld	W	D	L	GF	GA	GD	Pts
1	Internazionale	4	3	1	0	11	3	+8	7
2	Sampdoria	4	1	2	1	3	4	−1	4
3	Como	4	0	3	1	2	3	−1	3
4	Parma	4	1	1	2	3	5	−2	3
5	Catania	4	1	1	2	2	6	−4	3

=== Group 5 ===
Pos	Team	Pld	W	D	L	GF	GA	GD	Pts
1	Cesena	4	2	2	0	6	1	+5	6
2	Catanzaro	4	3	0	1	6	3	+3	6
3	Torino	4	2	1	1	5	4	+1	5
4	Reggina	4	1	0	3	2	6	−4	2
5	Ternana	4	0	1	3	2	7	−5	1

=== Group 6 ===
Pos	Team	Pld	W	D	L	GF	GA	GD	Pts
1	Bologna	4	2	1	1	8	6	+2	5
2	Napoli	4	2	1	1	7	5	+2	5
3	Reggiana	4	0	4	0	4	4	0	4
4	Avellino	4	1	1	2	4	6	−2	3
5	Genoa	4	1	1	2	3	5	−2	2 (Note: 1 point deducted.)

=== Group 7 ===
Pos	Team	Pld	W	D	L	GF	GA	GD	Pts
1	Atalanta	4	2	2	0	5	0	+5	6
2	Brindisi	4	2	1	1	5	1	+4	5
3	Vicenza	4	2	1	1	5	5	0	5
4	Taranto	4	1	1	2	2	7	−5	3
5	Cagliari	4	0	1	3	1	5	−4	1

== Second round ==
Join the defending champion: Milan.

=== Group A ===
Pos	Team	Pld	W	D	L	GF	GA	GD	Pts
1	Bologna	6	4	1	1	10	5	+5	9
2	Internazionale	6	4	0	2	7	5	+2	8
3	Milan	6	2	1	3	8	8	0	5
4	Atalanta	6	1	0	5	6	13	−7	2

=== Group B ===
Pos	Team	Pld	W	D	L	GF	GA	GD	Pts
1	Palermo	6	3	2	1	8	3	+5	8
2	Juventus	6	2	3	1	6	4	+2	7
3	Cesena	6	1	3	2	5	7	−2	5
4	Lazio	6	1	2	3	3	8	−5	4

== Final ==
23 May 1974
16:30

Bologna	1–1 (a.e.t.)	Palermo
G. Savoldi 90' (pen.)		Magistrelli 32'
Penalties
Bulgarelli (penalty scored); Cresci (penalty missed); G. Savoldi (penalty scored); Novellini (penalty scored); Pecci (penalty scored)	4–3	(penalty scored) Vanello; (penalty scored) Magistrelli; (penalty scored) Barbana; (penalty missed) Vullo; (penalty missed) E.Favalli

Stadio Olimpico, Rome
Attendance: 18,000
Referee: Sergio Gonella Cervo

== Top goalscorers ==
Rank	Player	Club	Goals
1	(Italy) Giuseppe Savoldi	Bologna	10
2	(Italy) Roberto Boninsegna	Internazionale	9
3	(Italy) Pietro Anastasi	Juventus	7
4	(Italy) Giorgio Chinaglia	Lazio	4
4	(Italy) Pierino Ghetti	Bologna	4
4	(Italy) Franco Pezzato	SPAL	4
