= Pizzaballa =

Pizzaballa (pronounced [pittsaˈballa]) is an Italian surname from Bergamo, derived from an archaic Lombard term for 'chatterbox' or 'troublemaker, one who picks fights'. Notable people with the surname include:

- Pierbattista Pizzaballa (born 1965), Italian Roman Catholic prelate
- Pierluigi Pizzaballa (born 1939), Italian footballer
