= Roberto Anzolin =

Italian footballer (1938–2017)

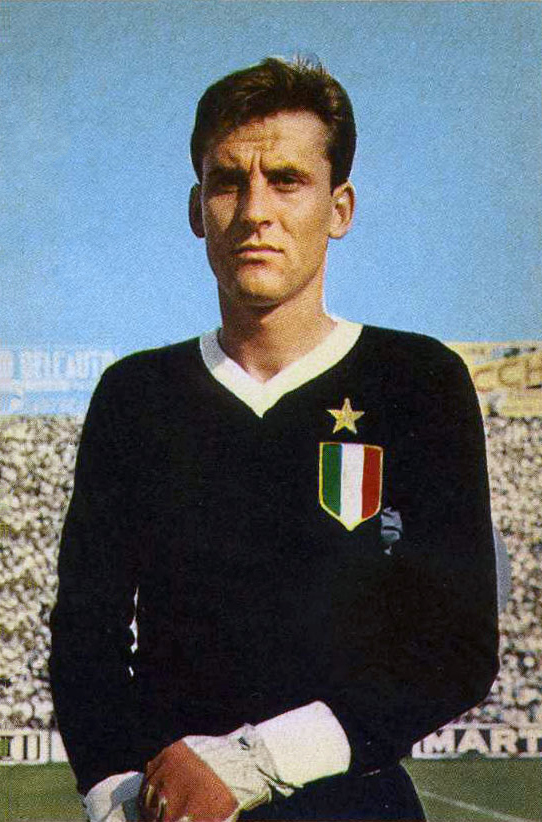
- Anzolin with Juventus in 1961

Personal information
- Date of birth: 18 April 1938
- Place of birth: Valdagno, Italy
- Date of death: 6 October 2017 (aged 79)
- Height: 1.76 m (5 ft 9 1/2 in)
- Position: Goalkeeper

Senior career*
Years	Team	Apps	(Gls)
1959–1961	Palermo	71	(0)
1961–1970	Juventus	230	(0)
1970–1971	Atalanta	?	(?)
1971–1973	Lanerossi Vicenza	12	(0)
1975–1976	Riccione	30	(?)
1976–1978	Juniorcasale	58	(?)

International career
1966	Italy	1	(0)
- * Club domestic league appearances and goals

Roberto Anzolin (Italian pronunciation: [roˈbɛrto antsoˈlin]; 18 April 1938 – 6 October 2017) was an Italian footballer, who played as a goalkeeper. Regarded as one of the best Italian goalkeepers of his generation, he played for several Italian sides, but is mostly remembered for his successful time with Juventus at club level. At international level, he represented the Italy national football team and was a member of Italy's squad at the 1966 FIFA World Cup.

== Club career ==
Anzolin made his professional debut with Marzotto Valdagno (1956–59) before moving to Palermo for two seasons. The club had purchased him for 40 million Lire, beating AC Milan by 5 million Lire, and offering him an annual salary of 5 million Lire. Before playing his final match of the 1960–61 Serie B season, he was informed of his transfer to Serie A winners Juventus, who signed him on a 14 million Lire contract. Palermo obtained Tarcisio Burgnich in exchange for their keeper, as well as Rune Börjesson on loan, and 100 million Lire.

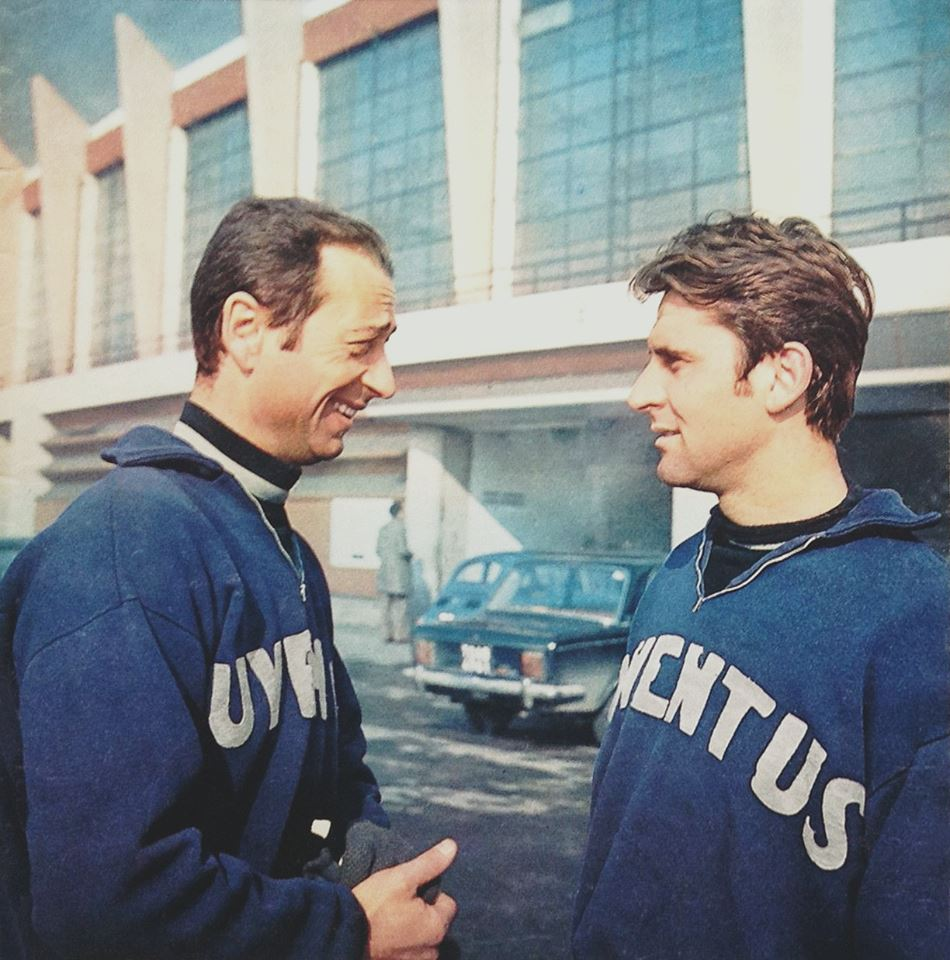
Anzolin (right) with Bianconeri in the 1968–69 season, in a break workout with his teammate Giuliano Sarti.

Anzolin is most noted for having played most of the 1960s with Italian Serie A giants Juventus, making 305 appearances (230 of which were in the league) with the club between 1961 and 1970. During his time at the club, he won a Serie A championship during the 1966–67 season, as well as a Coppa Italia during the 1964–65 season. He also won a minor international trophy with the club, the Coppa delle Alpi, in 1963. With Juventus, he also reached the semi-finals of the 1967–68 European Cup, losing to Benfica.

After his time with Juventus during the 60s and early 70s, he played for Atalanta for a season in Serie B, helping his club to gain promotion also thanks to a notable unbeaten streak of 792 minutes. He subsequently moved to Lanerossi Vicenza as a second keeper, before ending his career at the age of 40, playing in Serie C with Monza, Riccione, and JuniorCasale, winning two consecutive "semi-professional" Coppa Italia trophies with Monza, between 1973 and 1975. After retiring, however, he was called upon by Valdagno in the minor Promozione League, to replace their sick goalkeeper, and he played 26 matches, conceding only 4 goals, at the age of 46.

== International career ==
Anzolin was also part of the Italian squad in the 1966 FIFA World Cup as a substitute behind starting keeper Albertosi, as well as Pizzaballa. He made his only appearance for the Azzurri in a friendly pre-World Cup match against Mexico on 29 June 1966, which ended in a 5–0 victory for Italy, as he was later kept out of the squad by Dino Zoff.

== Style of play ==
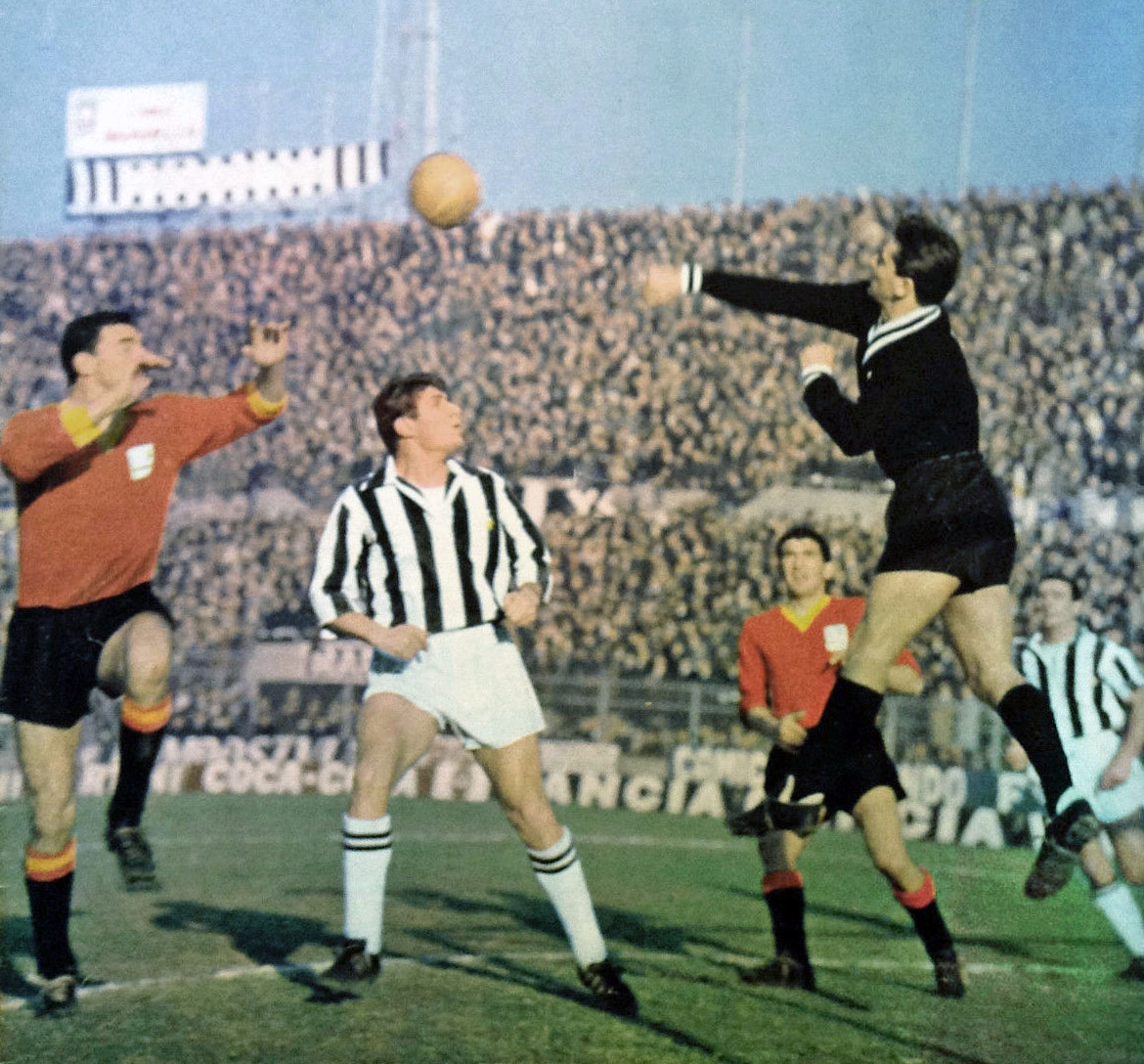
A saving by Anzolin for Juventus in 1965 against Messina

During his prime, Anzolin was regarded as one of the best goalkeepers in Italy, due to his consistency and shot-stopping ability. He was an effective, reactive, and agile goalkeeper, with a good positional sense, who was very quick to come off his line and collect low balls in the area, although at times he was caught out on crosses as he was neither particularly tall nor physically imposing. Because of his name, agility, and his relatively small stature and slender build for a goalkeeper – standing at 1.76 m (5 ft 9 1/2 in) –, he was given the nickname "the mosquito" (la zanzara, in Italian).

== Personal life ==
During his successful time with Italian club Juventus, Anzolin met and married his wife, Gabriella. Together, they had two children.

== Honours ==
Juventus

- Serie A: 1966–67
- Coppa Italia: 1964–65
- Coppa delle Alpi: 1963
