= 1975–76 Coppa Italia =

Tournament details
- Country: Italy
- Dates: 27 August 1975 – 29 June 1976
- Teams: 35

Final positions
- Champions: Napoli (2nd title)
- Runners-up: Hellas Verona

Tournament statistics
- Matches played: 95
- Goals scored: 225 (2.37 per match)
- Top goal scorer(s): Sergio Magistrelli (7 goals)

The 1975–76 Coppa Italia was the 29th season of Coppa Italia, the major Italian domestic association football cup. The competition was won by Napoli, who defeated Verona in a one-legged final played at the Stadio Olimpico in Rome.

== First round ==
The first round of the tournament consisted of seven groups with five teams each who played each other once in a single round robin format. All matches took place between 27 August and 21 September 1975. The seven group winners, joined by the defending champions Fiorentina, progressed to the second round.

=== Group 1 ===
| Pos | Team | Pld | W | D | L | GF | GA | GD | Pts |
|---|---|---|---|---|---|---|---|---|---|
| 1 | Internazionale (A) | 4 | 4 | 0 | 0 | 7 | 0 | +7 | 8 |
| 2 | Juventus (A) | 4 | 2 | 1 | 1 | 9 | 4 | +5 | 5 |
| 3 | Taranto (B) | 4 | 2 | 0 | 2 | 4 | 4 | 0 | 4 |
| 4 | Ternana (B) | 4 | 1 | 0 | 3 | 5 | 10 | −5 | 2 |
| 5 | Sambenedettese (B) | 4 | 0 | 1 | 3 | 3 | 10 | −7 | 1 |

Source: rsssf.com
Rules for classification: 1) points; 2) goal difference; 3) number of goals scored.
(A) Serie A; (B) Serie B

=== Group 2 ===
| Pos | Team | Pld | W | D | L | GF | GA | GD | Pts |
|---|---|---|---|---|---|---|---|---|---|
| 1 | Genoa (B) | 4 | 2 | 2 | 0 | 6 | 1 | +5 | 6 |
| 2 | Como (A) | 4 | 2 | 2 | 0 | 4 | 1 | +3 | 6 |
| 3 | Bologna (A) | 4 | 1 | 2 | 1 | 2 | 2 | 0 | 4 |
| 4 | Atalanta (B) | 4 | 1 | 0 | 3 | 4 | 7 | −3 | 2 |
| 5 | Modena (B) | 4 | 1 | 0 | 3 | 3 | 8 | −5 | 2 |

Source: rsssf.com
Rules for classification: 1) points; 2) goal difference; 3) number of goals scored.
(A) Serie A; (B) Serie B

=== Group 3 ===
| Pos | Team | Pld | W | D | L | GF | GA | GD | Pts |
|---|---|---|---|---|---|---|---|---|---|
| 1 | Napoli (A) | 4 | 3 | 1 | 0 | 9 | 3 | +6 | 7 |
| 2 | Cesena (A) | 4 | 3 | 1 | 0 | 5 | 1 | +4 | 7 |
| 3 | Foggia (B) | 4 | 2 | 0 | 2 | 7 | 8 | −1 | 4 |
| 4 | Reggiana (B) | 4 | 0 | 1 | 3 | 3 | 6 | −3 | 1 |
| 5 | Palermo (B) | 4 | 0 | 1 | 3 | 2 | 8 | −6 | 1 |

Source: rsssf.com
Rules for classification: 1) points; 2) goal difference; 3) number of goals scored.
(A) Serie A; (B) Serie B

=== Group 4 ===
| Pos | Team | Pld | W | D | L | GF | GA | GD | Pts |
|---|---|---|---|---|---|---|---|---|---|
| 1 | Lazio (A) | 4 | 2 | 2 | 0 | 3 | 0 | +3 | 6 |
| 2 | Brescia (B) | 4 | 1 | 3 | 0 | 2 | 0 | +2 | 5 |
| 3 | Ascoli (A) | 4 | 1 | 3 | 0 | 1 | 0 | +1 | 5 |
| 4 | Avellino (B) | 4 | 1 | 0 | 3 | 3 | 5 | −2 | 2 |
| 5 | Varese (B) | 4 | 0 | 2 | 2 | 0 | 4 | −4 | 2 |

Source: rsssf.com
Rules for classification: 1) points; 2) goal difference; 3) number of goals scored.
(A) Serie A; (B) Serie B

=== Group 5 ===
| Pos | Team | Pld | W | D | L | GF | GA | GD | Pts |
|---|---|---|---|---|---|---|---|---|---|
| 1 | Milan (A) | 4 | 3 | 1 | 0 | 7 | 2 | +5 | 7 |
| 2 | SPAL (B) | 4 | 2 | 1 | 1 | 4 | 2 | +2 | 5 |
| 3 | Perugia (A) | 4 | 1 | 2 | 1 | 5 | 4 | +1 | 4 |
| 4 | Catanzaro (B) | 4 | 1 | 1 | 2 | 4 | 7 | −3 | 3 |
| 5 | Brindisi (B) | 4 | 0 | 1 | 3 | 1 | 6 | −5 | 1 |

Source: rsssf.com
Rules for classification: 1) points; 2) goal difference; 3) number of goals scored.
(A) Serie A; (B) Serie B

=== Group 6 ===
| Pos | Team | Pld | W | D | L | GF | GA | GD | Pts |
|---|---|---|---|---|---|---|---|---|---|
| 1 | Sampdoria (A) | 4 | 4 | 0 | 0 | 12 | 5 | +7 | 8 |
| 2 | Roma (A) | 4 | 2 | 1 | 1 | 10 | 7 | +3 | 5 |
| 3 | Piacenza (B) | 4 | 1 | 1 | 2 | 5 | 7 | −2 | 3 |
| 4 | Vicenza (B) | 4 | 0 | 2 | 2 | 4 | 7 | −3 | 2 |
| 5 | Pescara (B) | 4 | 0 | 2 | 2 | 4 | 9 | −5 | 2 |

Source: rsssf.com
Rules for classification: 1) points; 2) goal difference; 3) number of goals scored.
(A) Serie A; (B) Serie B

=== Group 7 ===
| Pos | Team | Pld | W | D | L | GF | GA | GD | Pts |
|---|---|---|---|---|---|---|---|---|---|
| 1 | Hellas Verona (A) | 4 | 3 | 1 | 0 | 7 | 2 | +5 | 7 |
| 2 | Torino (A) | 4 | 3 | 0 | 1 | 7 | 3 | +4 | 6 |
| 3 | Catania (B) | 4 | 1 | 2 | 1 | 2 | 4 | −2 | 4 |
| 4 | Cagliari (A) | 4 | 0 | 2 | 2 | 2 | 5 | −3 | 2 |
| 5 | Novara (B) | 4 | 0 | 1 | 3 | 2 | 6 | −4 | 1 |

Source: rsssf.com
Rules for classification: 1) points; 2) goal difference; 3) number of goals scored.
(A) Serie A; (B) Serie B

== Second round ==
Join the defending champion: Fiorentina.

=== Group A ===
| Pos | Team | Pld | W | D | L | GF | GA | GD | Pts |
|---|---|---|---|---|---|---|---|---|---|
| 1 | Hellas Verona (A) | 6 | 3 | 2 | 1 | 8 | 4 | +4 | 8 |
| 2 | Internazionale (A) | 6 | 4 | 0 | 2 | 10 | 7 | +3 | 8 |
| 3 | Lazio (A) | 6 | 3 | 1 | 2 | 7 | 6 | +1 | 7 |
| 4 | Genoa (B) | 6 | 0 | 1 | 5 | 2 | 10 | −8 | 1 |

Source: rsssf.com
Rules for classification: 1) points; 2) goal difference; 3) number of goals scored.
(A) Serie A; (B) Serie B

=== Group B ===
| Pos | Team | Pld | W | D | L | GF | GA | GD | Pts |
|---|---|---|---|---|---|---|---|---|---|
| 1 | Napoli (A) | 6 | 3 | 3 | 0 | 9 | 5 | +4 | 9 |
| 2 | Fiorentina (A) | 6 | 1 | 5 | 0 | 10 | 8 | +2 | 7 |
| 3 | Milan (A) | 6 | 2 | 2 | 2 | 9 | 8 | +1 | 6 |
| 4 | Sampdoria (A) | 6 | 0 | 2 | 4 | 8 | 15 | −7 | 2 |

Source: rsssf.com
Rules for classification: 1) points; 2) goal difference; 3) number of goals scored.
(A) Serie A

== Final ==
29 June 1976
20:30

| Napoli | 4–0 | Hellas Verona |
|---|---|---|
| Ginulfi 76' (o.g.); Braglia 77'; Savoldi 79' 86' |

Stadio Olimpico, Rome
Referee: Riccardo Lattanzi

== Top goalscorers ==
| Rank | Player | Club | Goals |
|---|---|---|---|
| 1 | (Italy) Sergio Magistrelli | Sampdoria | 7 |
| 2 | (Italy) Giuseppe Savoldi | Napoli | 6 |
| 3 | (Italy) Nello Saltutti | Sampdoria | 5 |
| 3 | (Italy) Emiliano Macchi | Hellas Verona | 5 |
| 3 | (Italy) Giorgio Braglia | Napoli | 5 |
| 6 | (Italy) Giuseppe Massa | Napoli | 4 |
| 6 | (Italy) Sandro Mazzola | Internazionale | 4 |
| 6 | (Italy) Mario Scarpa | Perugia | 4 |

== See also ==
- 1975–76 Serie A
- 1975–76 Serie B
