= Sergio Gonella =

Italian businessman and football referee

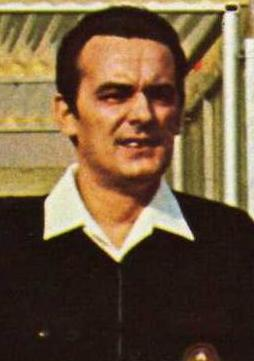
- Gonella in 1975
- Born: 23 May 1933; Asti, Italy
- Died: 19 June 2018 (aged 85); Asti
- Other occupation: Bank manager

Domestic
| Years | League | Role |
| 1964–1978 | Serie A | Referee |

International
| Years | League | Role |
| 1972–1978 | FIFA-listed | Referee |

Sergio Gonella (Italian pronunciation: [ˈsɛrdʒo ɡoˈnɛlla]; 23 May 1933 – 19 June 2018) was an Italian bank manager and association football referee. He was the first ever Italian appointed to referee the final of the FIFA World Cup which occurred when he took charge of the 1978 final between hosts Argentina and the Netherlands. He is one of only two persons (the other being the Swiss Gottfried Dienst) to have refereed the finals of both the UEFA European Championship and the FIFA World Cup. In 2013, he was inducted into the Italian Football Hall of Fame.

== Referee career ==
Gonella's professional career began in 1965 when he debuted in the Italian Serie A, earning an early reputation as being very strict and impartial, after awarding 7 penalties in the first 7 games of the 1965–66 Serie A season. In 1972, he was promoted to UEFA and received the important Mauro Award in Italy. In 1974, he officiated the Italian Cup final between Bologna and Palermo, where Sergio Gonella was criticised in the Italian media over his performance, and was even accused by some pundits of demonstrating clear favourtism towards Bologna, to the detriment of Palermo, when he awarded Giacomo Bulgarelli a penalty in the 90th minute of play, which was later converted by Giuseppe Savoldi to tie the game 1–1. Moreover, in the ensuing shoot-out after the score remained level following extra-time, when Bulgarelli had initially missed Bologna's first penalty, Gonella had him retake it, because he believed that Palermo's goalkeeper Sergio Girardi had moved too soon before saving the shot; Bulgarelli scored his second attempt, and Bologna won the shoot-out 4–3. In 1975, he refereed the first leg of the European Super Cup final match between Dynamo Kyiv and Bayern Munich.

At international level, Gonella refereed in the 1976 European Championship final between Czechoslovakia and West Germany at Stadion Crvena Zvezda, Belgrade; Czechoslovakia won the match 5–3 penalties following a 2–2 draw.

Gonella also later refereed in the 1978 FIFA World Cup, including the final between hosts Argentina and the Netherlands, which Argentina won 3–1 at the Estadio Monumental in Buenos Aires; following the match, he was criticised by the Dutch players for not penalising Argentina captain Daniel Passarella for allegedly elbowing Johan Neeskens. He also garnered media attention when he delayed the start of the World Cup final. This occurred when the Argentines protested an arm cast worn by Dutch player René van de Kerkhof. The Dutch team argued that the cast was passed by FIFA and had already been worn by Van de Kerkhof during earlier matches in the tournament, and they threatened to walk off the field. Finally an extra layer of padding was applied to the cast as a solution, and the match was started. Following the 1978 World Cup final, Gonella retired, having refereed 175 matches in Serie A.

From 1998 to 2000 Gonella was also president of the Italian Referee Association (AIA) and a member of the UEFA Arbitration Commission.

== Major matches refereed ==
| Date | Match | Tournament | Venue | Result | Ref |
|---|---|---|---|---|---|
| 9 September 1975 | Bayern Munich vs. Dynamo Kyiv | 1975 European Super Cup final (first leg) | Olympiastadion, Munich | 0–1 (0–3 on aggregate) | |
| 20 June 1976 | Czechoslovakia vs. West Germany | UEFA Euro 1976 final | Stadion Crvena Zvezda, Belgrade | 2–2 (5–3 on penalties) | |
| 25 June 1978 | Argentina vs. Netherlands | 1978 FIFA World Cup final | Estadio Monumental, Buenos Aires | 3–1 | |

== Honours ==
- Italian Football Hall of Fame: 2013
- Premio Giovanni Mauro: 1972

Sporting positions (Italy) Sergio Gonella
| Preceded by UEFA Euro 1972 Final (Austria); Ferdinand Marschall | UEFA Euro 1976 Final referee | Succeeded by UEFA Euro 1980 Final (Romania); Nicolae Rainea |
| Preceded by 1974 FIFA World Cup Final (England); Jack Taylor | 1978 FIFA World Cup Final referee | Succeeded by 1982 FIFA World Cup Final (Brazil); Arnaldo Cézar Coelho |
