= Sergio Girardi =

Italian footballer

Personal information
- Date of birth: March 26, 1946 (age 80)
- Place of birth: Belfiore, Italy
- Height: 1.80 m (5 ft 11 in)
- Position: Goalkeeper

Senior career*
| Years | Team | Apps | (Gls) |
| 1965–1968 | Mantova | 11 | (0) |
| 1968–1970 | Internazionale | 23 | (0) |
| 1970–1974 | Palermo | 119 | (0) |
| 1974–1980 | Genoa | 182 | (0) |
| 1980–1984 | Mantova | 104 | (0) |
| 1984–1985 | Ravenna | 30 | (0) |
- * Club domestic league appearances and goals

Sergio Girardi (born March 26, 1946, in Belfiore) is a retired Italian professional footballer who played as a goalkeeper.

== Career ==
Girardi reached the 1974 Coppa Italia final with Palermo, where his side were controversially defeated by Bologna 4–3 on penalty kicks, after the match ended 1–1 following extra time. During the shoot-out, Girardi initially saved Bologna's first penalty, taken by Giacomo Bulgarelli, but the referee Sergio Gonella had him retake it, because he believed that Girardi had moved too soon; Bulgarelli scored his second attempt. Girardi later saved Franco Cresci's spot kick, which was not enough to prevent Bologna from winning the shoot-out.
