= Giacomo Bulgarelli =

Italian footballer (1940–2009)

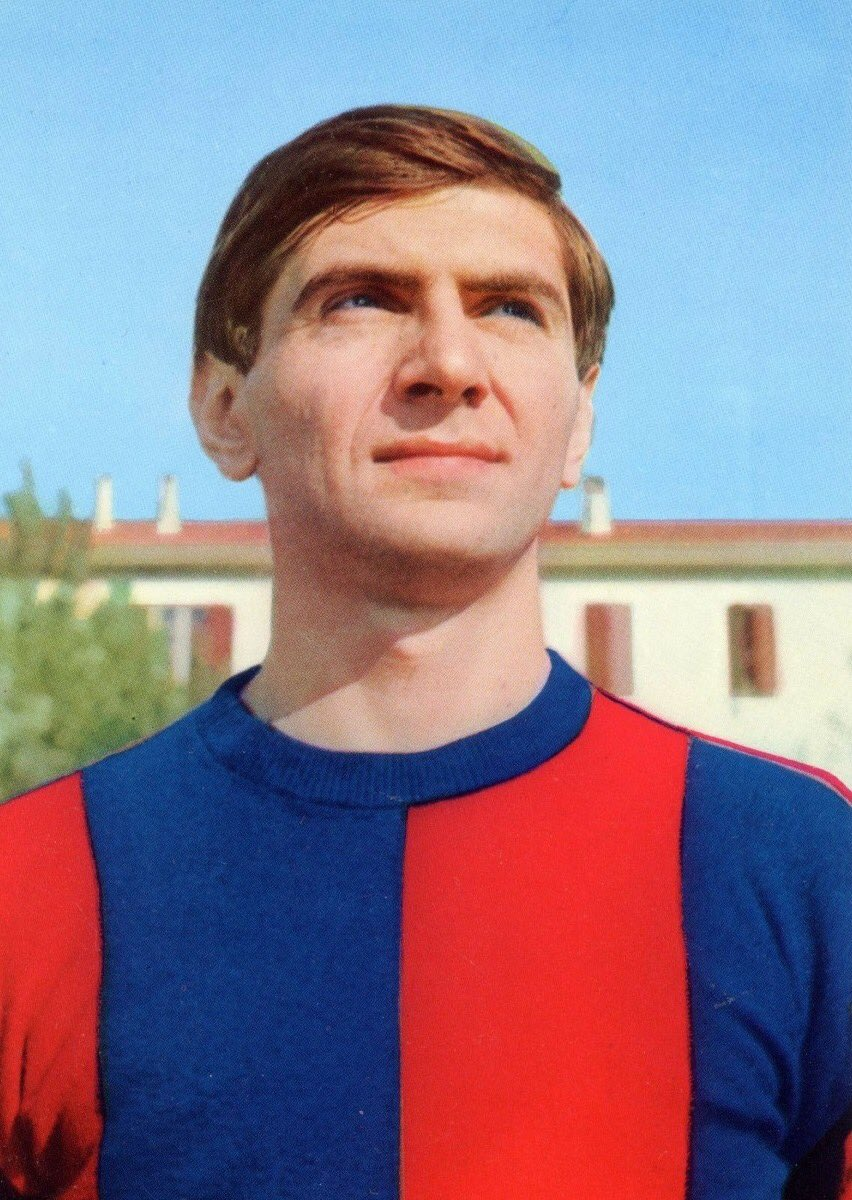
- Bulgarelli with Bologna

Personal information
- Full name: Giacomo Bulgarelli
- Date of birth: 24 October 1940
- Place of birth: Portonovo di Medicina, Italy
- Date of death: 12 February 2009 (aged 68)
- Place of death: Bologna, Italy
- Position: Midfielder

Senior career*
Years	Team	Apps	(Gls)
1959–1975	Bologna	391	(43)
1975	Hartford Bicentennials	2	(0)
Total		393	(43)

International career
1962–1968	Italy	29	(7)
Medal record
Men's football
Representing Italy (as player)
UEFA European Championship
Winner	1968 Italy
- * Club domestic league appearances and goals

Giacomo Bulgarelli (Italian pronunciation: [ˈdʒaːkomo bulɡaˈrɛlli]; 24 October 1940 – 12 February 2009) was an Italian international footballer who played as a midfielder. Regarded as one of Italy's greatest ever midfielders, Bulgarelli spent his entire club career with Italian side Bologna, where he also served as the team's captain; an important figure with the club, he is the team's record all-time appearance holder, and won the Serie A title with the Bolognese side in 1964, among other trophies. Following his retirement, he had a brief spell in America with the Hartford Bicentennials in 1975, and later also had a successful career as a football commentator in the 90s.

At international level, Bulgarelli represented Italy at the 1960 Summer Olympics in Rome, where the team finished in fourth place, and in two FIFA World Cups; he made his senior international debut at the 1962 edition of the tournament, and marked the occasion with two goals, becoming Italy's youngest ever World Cup goalscorer. He was also a member of the Italian side that won UEFA Euro 1968.

== Club career ==
Bulgarelli was born in Portonovo di Medicina, Bologna.

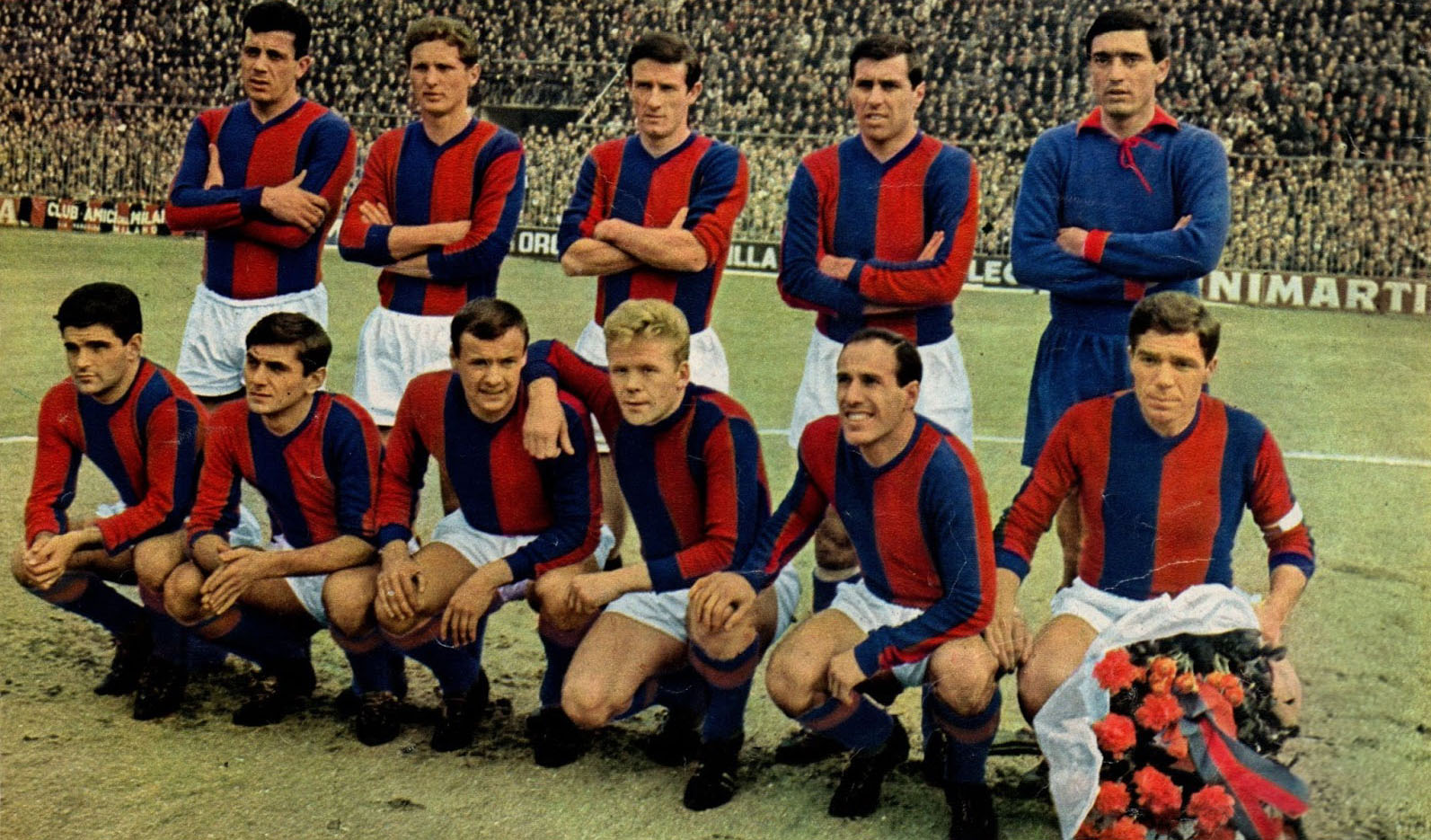
Bulgarelli (kneeling, second from left) with the 1963–64 rossoblù Italian champions

His entire Italian club career was spent with Bologna, for whom he also served as captain. He made 391 Serie A appearances for the club between 1958–59 and 1974–75, as well as 54 in the Coppa Italia, 3 in the European Cup, 2 in the Cup Winners' Cup, 20 in the Inter-Cities Fairs Cup, 4 in the Mitropa Cup, and 2 in the Anglo-Italian League Cup; he scored 58 goals in all competitions, 43 of which came in Serie A.

He won the title with the club in 1964, after they defeated Herrera's "Grande" Inter Milan 2–0 in a play-off match; this was the only time in history that the league title had been decided in such a manner. He also won the Coppa Italia twice with the club during the 1970s, as well as a Mitropa Cup and an Anglo-Italian League Cup. In the 1974 Coppa Italia final against Palermo, he scored Bologna's first penalty in the 4–3 shoot-out victory following a 1–1 draw. During the match, Bulgarelli won a penalty in the 90th minute of play, which was later converted by Giuseppe Savoldi to tie the game. In the shoot-out, Bulgarelli had initially missed Bologna's first penalty, by referee Sergio Gonella had him retake it, because he believed that Palermo's goalkeeper Sergio Girardi had moved too soon; Bulgarelli scored his second attempt, and Bologna eventually won the shoot-out. With 488 appearances in all competitions, Bulgarelli is Bologna's record all-time appearance holder.

He finished his career with a brief spell in 1975 with the Hartford Bicentennials in the USA.

== International career ==
Bulgarelli played three matches for Italy at the 1960 Summer Olympics.

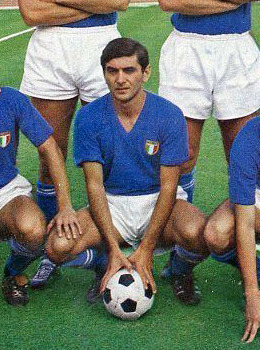
Bulgarelli with the Italy national team in 1965

He made his senior debut for the Italy national team at the 1962 World Cup, on 7 June, scoring two goals in a 3–0 win in Italy's final group match against Switzerland, which were unable to prevent the team from being eliminated in the first round. With these goals, he became the youngest ever goalscorer for Italy at the FIFA World Cup, at the age of 21 years and 226 days. He played all three matches for Italy at the 1966 World Cup. Throughout the tournament, he also featured as the team's captain ahead of Sandro Salvadore in the team's infamous and historic 1–0 defeat to North Korea in Middlesbrough, on 19 July, which led to the Italians' elimination from the World Cup. During the match, Bulgarelli was forced off due to a knee injury when the score was still 0–0, leaving the Italians a man down for the remainder of the match, as substitutions were not permitted at the time. His only other appearance as Italy's captain came on 18 June 1966, in a friendly match against Austria.

He was a member of the Italy squad that won the 1968 UEFA European Championship on home soil, where his leadership and experience played an important role in the team's success, even though he did not appear throughout the final stages of the tournament; his last international appearance came against Romania, in 1967. He made a total of 29 appearances for the Italy national side, scoring 7 times.

== Style of play ==
Bulgarelli was a tenacious, hard-working, and complete midfielder, who was known for his positional sense, consistency, and footballing intelligence, as well as his influence and leadership on the pitch. In addition to being adept defensively as a ball-winner, where he excelled at breaking down plays and subsequently distributing the ball to teammates, he also possessed excellent vision, passing ability and technical skills, and was therefore also capable of setting the tempo of his team in midfield as a playmaker. He was also known for his offensive attributes, which saw him score several goals from midfield. Fabio Capello described him as Italy's greatest ever midfielder.

== After retirement ==
After his retirement from professional football, he worked as a sporting director, and he also had a successful career as a football commentator and pundit, in particular during the 90s, working with RAI, Mediaset, and La Gazzetta dello Sport; he also partnered up with fellow pundit Massimo Caputi to provide the Italian commentary for the EA Sports FIFA video game series from 1998 to 2002.

He died in Bologna, on 12 February 2009, after a lengthy illness.

== Outside of football ==
On 3 July 1968, Bulgarelli founded the Italian Footballers' Association (AIC), in Milan, along with several fellow footballers, such as Gianni Rivera, Sandro Mazzola, Ernesto Castano, Giancarlo De Sisti, and Giacomo Losi, as well as the recently retired Sergio Campana, also a lawyer, who was appointed president of the association.

== Honours ==
=== Club ===
Bologna

- Serie A: 1963–64
- Coppa Italia: 1969–70, 1973–74
- Mitropa Cup: 1961
- Anglo-Italian League Cup: 1970

=== International ===
Italy

- UEFA European Championship: 1968

=== Individual ===
- Italian Football Hall of Fame: 2014 (Posthumous honour)
