= Giacomo Vianello =

Italian footballer (1947–2022)

Personal information
- Date of birth: 4 June 1947
- Place of birth: Cavallino-Treporti, Italy
- Date of death: 13 January 2022 (aged 74)
- Position: Defender

Youth career
- San Donà

Senior career*
Years	Team	Apps	(Gls)
1964–1965	San Donà		
1965–1967	Fermana		
1967–1969	Ternana		
1969–1972	Napoli	22	(0)
1972–1974	Atalanta		
1974–1977	Palermo		
1977–1978	Livorno		
1978–1979	Como		
- * Club domestic league appearances and goals

Giacomo Vianello (4 June 1947 – 13 January 2022) was an Italian professional footballer who played as a defender for San Donà, Fermana, Ternana, Napoli, Atalanta, Palermo, Livorno and Como. 48 of Vianello's games came in the Serie A.

Vianello was born in Cavallino-Treporti on 4 June 1947. He died on 13 January 2022, at the age of 74.
