= 1975–76 Serie B =

Italian football league season

Serie B
- Season: 1975–76
- Champions: Genoa; 5th title

Serie B 1975-76 team distribution

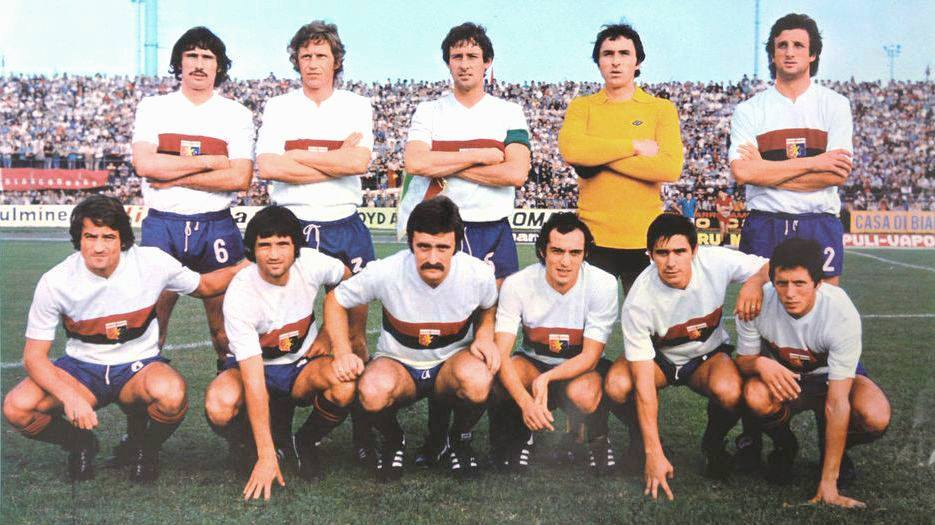

The Serie B 1975–76 was the forty-fourth tournament of this competition played in Italy since its creation.

== Teams ==
Piacenza, Modena and Catania had been promoted from Serie C, while Vicenza, Ternana and Varese had been relegated from Serie A.

== Final classification ==
Pos	Team	Pld	W	D	L	GF	GA	GD	Pts	Promotion or relegation
1	Genoa (P, C)	38	14	17	7	57	33	+24	45	Promotion to Serie A
2	Catanzaro (P)	38	16	13	9	36	23	+13	45	Promotion to Serie A
3	Foggia (P)	38	15	15	8	28	23	+5	45	Promotion to Serie A
4	Varese	38	15	14	9	50	37	+13	44	
5	Brescia	38	13	17	8	42	37	+5	43	
6	Novara	38	10	21	7	31	29	+2	41	
7	S.P.A.L.	38	14	12	12	40	36	+4	40	
8	Modena	38	13	13	12	30	34	−4	39	
9	Avellino	38	15	8	15	38	34	+4	38	
10	Atalanta	38	13	12	13	26	24	+2	38	
11	Palermo	38	11	16	11	34	35	−1	38	
12	Taranto	38	11	16	11	28	31	−3	38	
13	Sambenedettese	38	11	16	11	26	30	−4	38	
14	Pescara	38	12	14	12	25	32	−7	38	
15	Ternana	38	11	15	12	30	33	−3	37	
16	Lanerossi Vicenza	38	9	17	12	36	35	+1	35	
17	Catania	38	9	17	12	27	30	−3	35	
18	Piacenza (R)	38	10	12	16	42	50	−8	32	Relegation to Serie C
19	Brindisi (R)	38	7	13	18	20	41	−21	27	Relegation to Serie C
20	Reggiana (R)	38	5	14	19	31	50	−19	24	Relegation to Serie C

Source: Panini
(C) Champions; (P) Promoted; (R) Relegated

== Results ==
Home \ Away	ATA	AVE	BRE	BRI	CTN	CTZ	FOG	GEN	LRV	MOD	NOV	PAL	PES	PIA	REA	SBN	SPA	TAR	TER	VAR
Atalanta		1–0	1–1	3–0	1–0	1–0	1–0	0–1	1–0	1–1	1–1	2–0	2–0	1–0	0–0	0–0	0–0	1–0	2–0	1–0
Avellino	2–0		3–0	0–0	2–1	1–1	2–0	0–0	2–1	1–1	1–0	1–0	0–2	3–0	0–0	2–0	2–1	2–0	0–0	3–0
Brescia	1–0	3–1		0–0	2–2	1–0	0–0	1–1	1–0	1–2	1–2	0–1	2–2	2–1	1–0	4–2	3–1	1–0	2–1	2–2
Brindisi	1–1	1–0	1–1		0–0	0–1	1–1	1–1	3–1	0–1	1–0	0–2	0–0	2–0	1–2	0–0	1–0	1–0	0–1	1–0
Catania	1–0	1–0	0–0	0–0		0–0	0–0	2–1	0–0	4–1	0–1	1–1	1–1	1–1	2–1	2–0	1–2	1–0	0–2	0–0
Catanzaro	1–0	3–1	1–1	2–0	1–0		0–0	0–0	1–1	1–1	3–0	2–1	2–0	1–0	0–0	2–1	2–0	2–1	1–0	1–2
Foggia	1–0	2–0	0–0	1–0	0–0	2–1		0–2	1–0	1–0	1–0	0–0	1–0	2–1	1–0	0–0	1–0	1–0	1–0	1–0
Genoa	3–1	0–1	5–2	2–0	1–1	0–1	3–1		2–2	3–0	1–1	1–1	1–1	2–2	3–2	4–0	2–0	3–0	0–0	1–3
L.R. Vicenza	1–1	4–1	1–0	1–1	1–1	2–1	1–1	3–2		1–0	3–0	0–0	2–0	0–0	2–0	1–1	1–1	0–0	2–0	0–2
Modena	1–0	1–0	1–2	2–0	1–0	1–0	1–0	0–2	2–1		0–0	2–0	1–0	0–0	0–0	1–0	0–1	1–0	2–4	2–2
Novara	2–0	2–1	0–0	1–0	1–0	0–0	0–0	1–1	0–0	0–0		1–0	0–0	2–1	3–0	0–0	1–2	2–2	0–0	1–1
Palermo	0–0	0–0	0–0	2–0	1–1	1–0	1–1	1–1	1–0	1–0	2–2		0–0	4–0	2–0	2–1	0–0	1–2	2–0	1–1
Pescara	0–0	1–0	0–0	1–0	1–1	1–2	2–1	0–2	1–0	2–1	1–0	0–0		2–1	1–0	0–1	0–0	1–0	1–0	0–2
Piacenza	1–2	1–0	1–3	2–2	0–1	0–0	1–0	1–1	1–0	2–1	2–2	3–0	2–0		1–1	2–0	1–0	1–1	3–2	3–1
Reggiana	1–1	0–1	0–1	3–1	1–1	1–2	1–2	1–0	1–1	0–0	1–1	2–3	2–2	2–2		3–0	1–2	1–1	2–0	1–3
Sambenedettese	1–0	3–0	1–0	2–0	2–0	0–0	1–1	1–0	2–0	0–0	1–1	2–0	1–0	0–0	0–0		0–0	1–1	0–0	2–1
SPAL	0–0	0–5	0–0	1–0	2–0	0–0	1–0	1–1	1–1	1–1	1–2	3–1	3–0	2–1	3–0	0–0		3–0	1–2	2–0
Taranto	1–0	1–0	1–0	0–0	1–0	1–1	1–1	1–1	2–1	1–1	0–0	1–1	0–0	3–2	1–0	1–0	2–0		0–0	2–0
Ternana	1–0	0–0	0–0	3–1	0–1	1–0	1–1	0–3	0–0	2–0	1–1	2–1	1–1	2–1	2–0	0–0	0–2	0–0		2–2
Varese	1–0	3–0	3–3	3–0	1–0	1–0	1–1	0–0	1–1	0–0	0–0	3–0	0–1	2–1	3–1	2–0	4–3	0–0	0–0	

Source: Almanacco Illustrato del Calcio - La Storia 1898-2004, Panini Edizioni, Modena, September 2005 (in Italian)
Legend: Blue = home team win; Yellow = draw; Red = away team win.

== Attendances ==
#	Club	Average
1	Genoa	24,375
2	Atalanta	14,543
3	Palermo	13,994
4	Pescara	13,128
5	Catanzaro	11,610
6	Taranto	11,554
7	SPAL	11,205
8	Ternana	11,187
9	Foggia	11,143
10	Brescia	10,900
11	Modena	10,397
12	Reggiana	9,958
13	Catania	9,384
14	Piacenza	8,722
15	Avellino	8,064
16	Vicenza	7,904
17	Novara	6,650
18	Sambenedettese	6,585
19	Varese	6,178
20	Brindisi	4,738

== References and sources ==
- Almanacco Illustrato del Calcio - La Storia 1898-2004, Panini Edizioni, Modena, September 2005

Specific
