= Börjesson =

Swedish surname

Börjesson is a surname. Notable people with the surname include:

- Agnes Börjesson (1827–1900), Swedish painter
- Agneta Börjesson (born 1957), Swedish politician
- Bengt Börjesson (1920–1977), Swedish politician
- Dick Börjesson (born 1938), Swedish vice admiral
- Erik Börjesson (1886–1983), Swedish football striker
- Johan Börjesson (1790–1866), Swedish prelate, poet, and dramatist
- Josef Börjesson (1891–1971), Swedish amateur football player
- Kristina Borjesson (1954–2023), American freelance journalist
- Reino Börjesson (1929–2023), Swedish footballer
- Rune Börjesson (1937–1996), Swedish international football player
- Sören Börjesson (1956–2024), Swedish football manager and player
