= Sergio Magistrelli =

Italian footballer

Personal information
- Date of birth: 11 November 1951 (age 74)
- Place of birth: Sedriano, Italy
- Height: 1.76 m (5 ft 9 1/2 in)
- Position: Striker

Senior career*
Years	Team	Apps	(Gls)
1968–1971	Como	56	(20)
1971–1972	Atalanta	30	(7)
1972–1973	Internazionale	14	(2)
1973–1974	Palermo	25	(9)
1974–1976	Sampdoria	41	(8)
1976–1978	Palermo	62	(14)
1978–1983	Lecce	138	(29)
1983–1984	Francavilla	13	(1)
- * Club domestic league appearances and goals

Sergio Magistrelli (born 11 November 1951 in Sedriano) is an Italian former professional footballer who played as a forward. He played in Serie A for Atalanta, Inter and Sampdoria.

== Career ==
In the 1974 Coppa Italia final against Bologna, Magistrelli scored the opening goal of the match for Palermo; after the match ended in a 1–1 draw, Magistrelli converted another spot kick in the shoot-out, which Bologna won 4–3.

== Honours ==
=== Individual ===
- Serie B top scorer: 1970–71 (15 goals)
- Coppa Italia top scorer: 1975–76 (7 goals).
