= Alessandro Turini =

Italian footballer (born 1950)

Personal information
- Date of birth: 14 January 1950 (age 76)
- Place of birth: Busto Arsizio, Italy
- Height: 1.65 m (5 ft 5 in)
- Positions: Midfielder; striker

Youth career
- Pro Patria

Senior career*
Years	Team	Apps	(Gls)
1968–1970	Pro Patria	47	(11)
1970–1973	Como	65	(16)
1973–1975	Milan	5	(0)
1974–1975	→ Verona (loan)	21	(1)
1975–1980	Taranto	86	(11)
1978–1979	→ Crotone (loan)	29	(11)
1980–1981	Cavese	30	(5)
1981–1983	Savona	55	(9)
- * Club domestic league appearances and goals

Alessandro Turini (born 14 January 1950) is an Italian former footballer who, playing as a midfielder or forward, made more than 300 appearances in the Italian professional leagues. He played 5 games, scoring once, in Serie A for A.C. Milan during the 1973–74 season, and also played for them in the 1973 European Super Cup and the 1974 European Cup Winners' Cup Final, both of which Milan lost.
