= Sandro Vanello =

Italian footballer

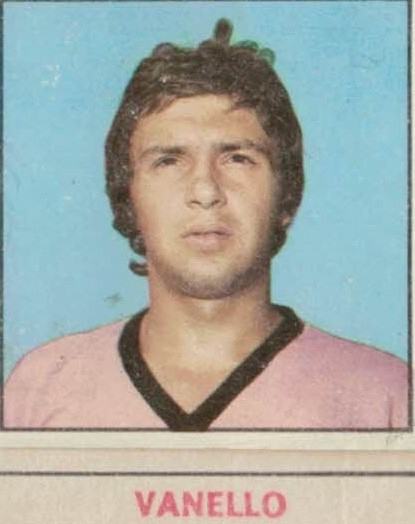

Personal information
- Date of birth: February 15, 1948 (age 78)
- Place of birth: Tarcento, Italy
- Height: 1.79 m (5 ft 10 1/2 in)
- Position: Midfielder

Senior career*
Years	Team	Apps	(Gls)
1967–1970	Internazionale	8	(1)
1968–1969	→ Verona (loan)	18	(4)
1970–1975	Palermo	151	(12)
1975–1978	Bologna	25	(0)
1976–1977	→ Sambenedettese (loan)	24	(2)
- * Club domestic league appearances and goals

Sandro Vanello (born February 15, 1948, in Tarcento) is a retired Italian professional footballer who played as a midfielder.
