= Salvatore Vullo =

Italian footballer (born 1953)

Personal information
- Date of birth: 30 October 1953 (age 72)
- Place of birth: Favara, Italy
- Height: 1.80 m (5 ft 11 in)
- Position: Defender

Senior career*
Years	Team	Apps	(Gls)
1973–1975	Palermo	20	(0)
1975–1976	Olbia	36	(1)
1976–1978	Palermo	64	(1)
1978–1980	Torino	53	(2)
1980–1981	Bologna	26	(0)
1981–1983	Sampdoria	43	(3)
1983–1986	Avellino	51	(3)
1986–1987	Catania	29	(0)
- * Club domestic league appearances and goals

Salvatore Vullo (born 30 October 1953 in Favara, Sicily) is an Italian football manager and former player who played as a defender for several Serie A and Serie B teams, including Palermo, Torino, Bologna, Sampdoria and Catania.
