= Enrico Lanzi =

Italian footballer and coach (1953–2025)

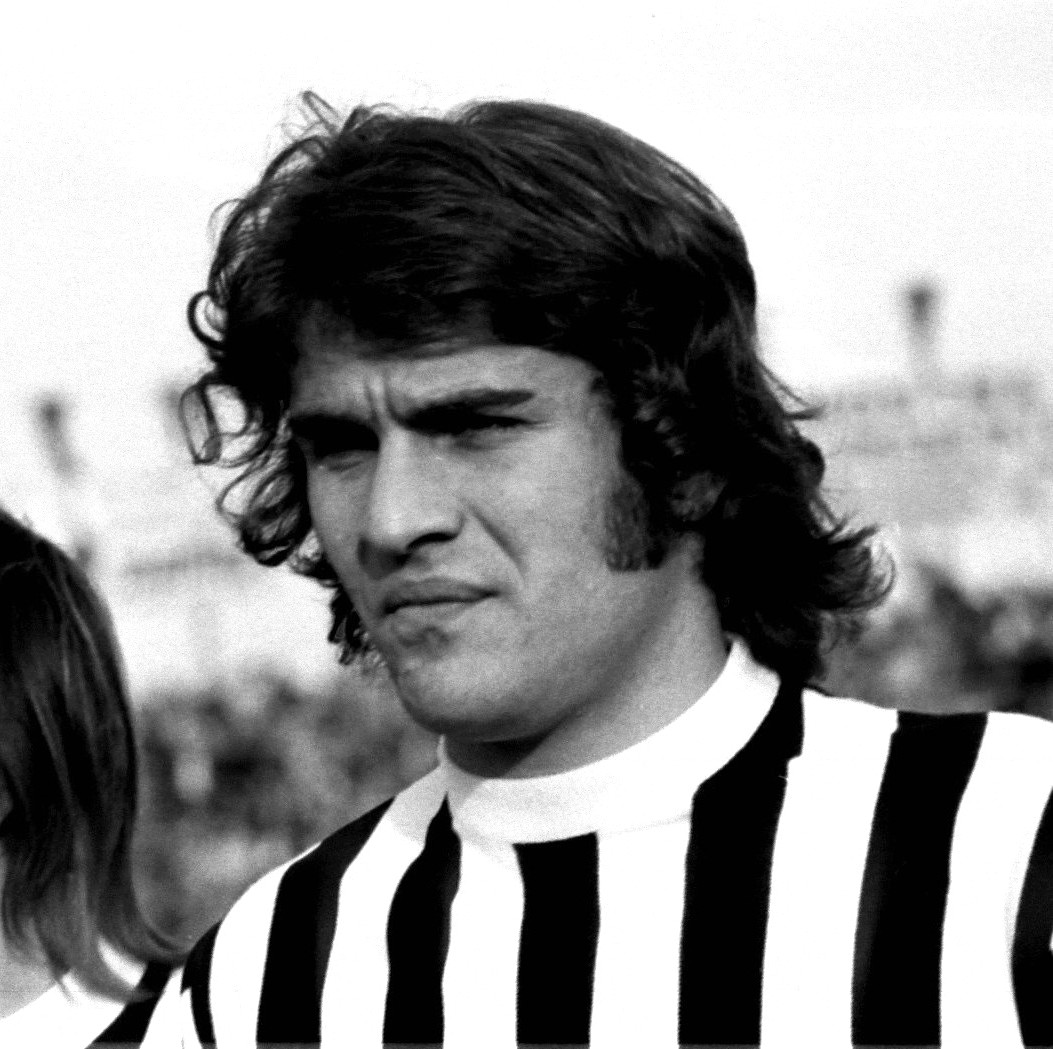
- Lanzi with Cesena in the 1972–73 season

Personal information
- Date of birth: 5 February 1953
- Place of birth: Spessa, Italy
- Date of death: 5 August 2025 (aged 72)
- Height: 1.80 m (5 ft 11 in)
- Position: Defender

Youth career
- A.C. Milan

Senior career*
Years	Team	Apps	(Gls)
1971–1974	A.C. Milan	5	(0)
1972–1973	→ Cesena (loan)	34	(2)
1974–1975	Varese	16	(0)
1975–1977	Perugia	12	(0)
1977–1978	Monza	27	(0)
1978–1981	Campobasso	50	(1)
1981–1984	Paganese	34	(2)

Managerial career
- 1995: Vogherese
- 1997–1998: Pavia
- * Club domestic league appearances and goals

Enrico Lanzi (5 February 1953 – 5 August 2025) was an Italian professional football coach and a player, who played as a defender.

Lanzi played four seasons (33 games, no goals) in the Serie A for A.C. Milan, Varese F.C. and Perugia Calcio.

Despite playing just a few games for Milan, he managed to put his name in infamy in the club's history books, scoring an own goal in the 1974 European Cup Winners' Cup Final that Milan ended up losing 2–0 to 1. FC Magdeburg.

Lanzi died on 5 August 2025, at the age of 72.
