= Franco Bergamaschi =

Italian footballer

Personal information
- Date of birth: 9 February 1951 (age 75)
- Place of birth: Verona, Italy
- Height: 1.78 m (5 ft 10 in)
- Position: Midfielder

Youth career
- Hellas Verona

Senior career*
Years	Team	Apps	(Gls)
1970–1973	Hellas Verona	81	(3)
1973–1974	A.C. Milan	18	(1)
1974–1975	Genoa C.F.C.	29	(1)
1975–1976	A.C. Milan	6	(1)
1976–1978	U.S. Foggia	54	(7)
1978–1980	Hellas Verona	14	(2)
1980–1981	A.C. Cesena	14	(?)
1981–1982	Rimini Calcio F.C.	15	(1)
- * Club domestic league appearances and goals

Franco Bergamaschi (born 9 February 1951) is a former football player who played as a midfielder for several Italian clubs in the 1970s and early 1980s.

== Club career ==
Bergamaschi began his football career at his home town club of Hellas Verona. He soon established himself in the first eleven and was regarded as one of the best midfielders of the time, gaining an invitation to the Under-21 national side managed by Vicini and later the Under-23 under Bearzot.

For the 1973–74 season, he transferred to A.C. Milan who had signed him after his great performance in their historic 3–5 defeat when Verona crushed Milan's scudetto hopes on the last day of the championship the season before. With Milan, however, the midfielder was not able to excel in the generally mediocre Rossoneri team who had a disappointing league season and whose positive displays in the European Cup Winners' Cup ended in a bitter final defeat against 1. FC Magdeburg in Rotterdam. Bergamaschi played for Genoa the following season and returned to Milan to spend the 1975–76 season largely in the reserves, with only six appearances in Serie A.

For the 1976–77 season, the midfielder was sold to Foggia and with the club he returned to his usual form, helping the Apulian team win promotion to Serie A. His return to Verona for the 1978–79 season coincided with one of the most negative performances of the club in Serie A that resulted in relegation to the second-tier Serie B. Bergamaschi stayed with the club for another season despite the relegation, but then moved to A.C. Cesena in 1980. After securing promotion to Serie A with his new club in 1981, he played one more season for Rimini Calcio F.C. and ended his playing career in 1982.

== International career ==
Although Bergamaschi was never capped for Italy at senior level, he received three call-ups for Italy U21 under manager Azeglio Vicini, and later received two call-ups for Italy U23 under manager Enzo Bearzot.

== Playing style ==
Operating as a playmaker and winger, Bergamaschi displayed tactical awareness and vision. His technical abilities included precise long passing, which enabled quick counter-attacking play.
