= Giuseppe Savoldi =

Italian footballer (1947–2026)

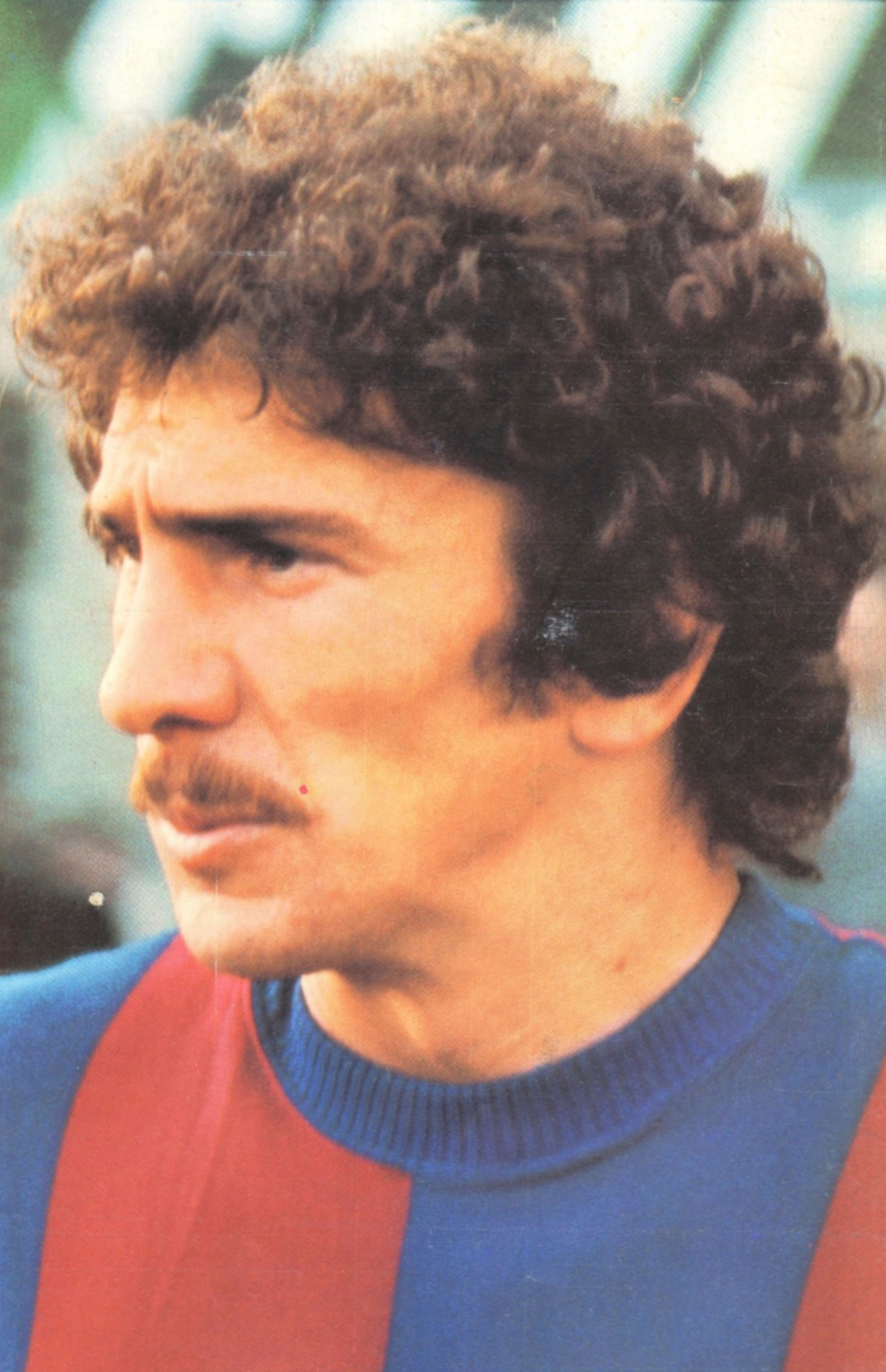
- Savoldi with Bologna in the 1974–75 season

Personal information
- Date of birth: 21 January 1947
- Place of birth: Gorlago, Bergamo, Italy
- Date of death: 26 March 2026 (aged 79)
- Place of death: Bergamo, Italy
- Height: 1.75 m (5 ft 9 in)
- Position: Striker

Senior career*
| Years | Team | Apps | (Gls) |
| 1965–1968 | Atalanta | 57 | (17) |
| 1968–1975 | Bologna | 201 | (85) |
| 1975–1979 | Napoli | 118 | (55) |
| 1979–1982 | Bologna | 29 | (11) |
| 1982–1983 | Atalanta | 16 | (1) |
| Total | | 421 | (169) |

International career
| 1968–1969 | Italy U21 | 7 | (1) |
| 1975 | Italy | 4 | (1) |

Managerial career
- 1985–1988: Atalanta U19
- 1989: Carrarese
- 1997: Siena
- * Club domestic league appearances and goals

Giuseppe Savoldi (Italian pronunciation: [dʒuˈzɛppe saˈvɔldi]; 21 January 1947 – 26 March 2026) was an Italian professional football player and coach who played during the 1960s, 1970s and 1980s as a forward. A versatile attacker, he played club football in Italy for Atalanta, Bologna and Napoli, and represented the Italy national side at international level.

Savoldi was the world's first million-pound player in football signed by Napoli in 1975 for a world-record fee.

== Club career ==
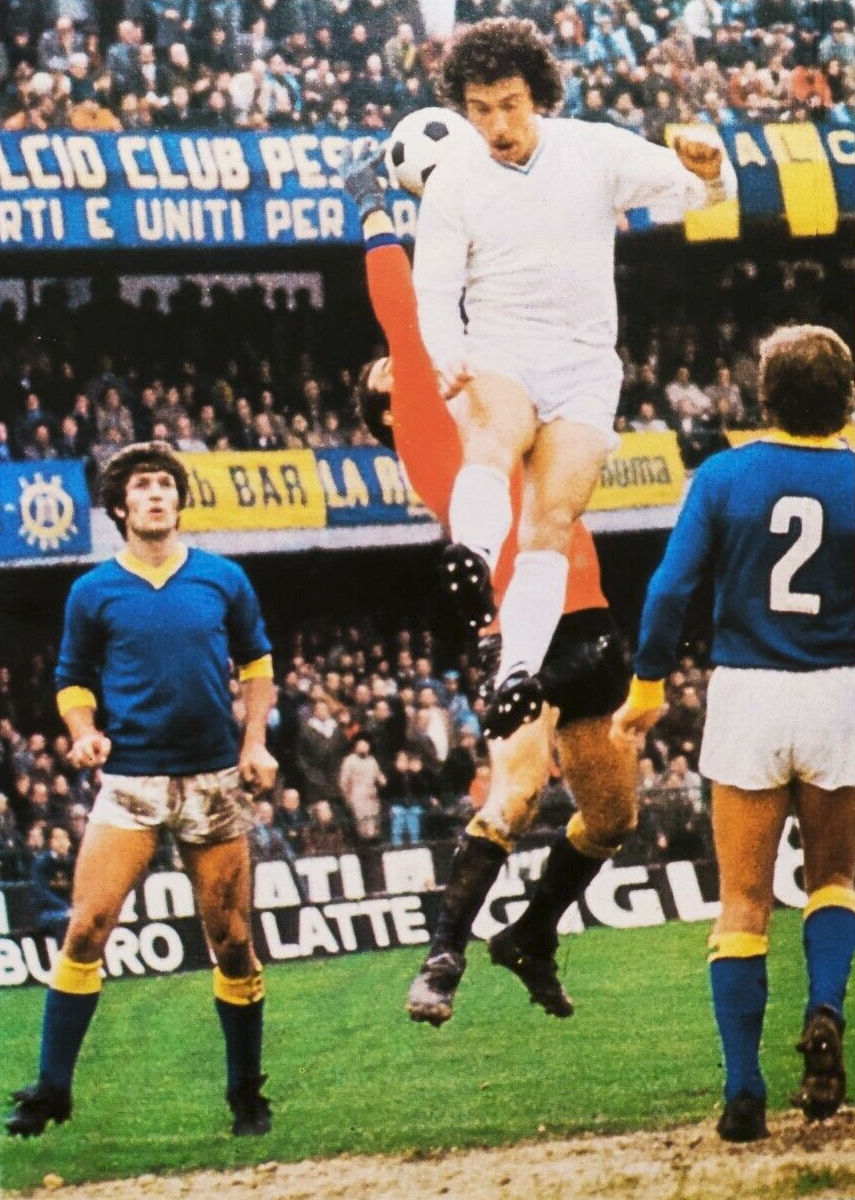
Savoldi playing for Napoli in the 1975–76 season

Born in Gorlago, Bergamo, Savoldi made his debut in Serie A in 1965 with Atalanta. From 1968 to 1975 he played in the red and blue kit of Bologna, making 201 appearances, scoring 85 goals. He gained popularity and notoriety as a goalscoring striker with the Emilian club, achieving notable success, winning two Coppa Italia titles in 1970 and 1974, finishing both editions as top scorer with ten goals. He also win the Anglo-Italian League Cup in 1970, as well as winning the Serie A top scorer award during the 1972–73 Serie A season, with 17 goals. In the 1974 Coppa Italia final against Palermo, Savoldi scored a penalty in the 90th minute to tie the game 1–1, and later converted another spot kick in Bologna's 4–3 victory in the penalty shoot-out.

In 1975, he was signed by Napoli for a then world record two billion Lira (£1.2 million), becoming football's first million pound player. With the club, he continued his success, becoming a popular figure with the fans, as he won his third Coppa Italia title during the 1975–76 season, also finishing as the Coppa Italia top scorer, with 12 goals, during the 1977–78 season. He also helped the club to win the Anglo-Italian League Cup in 1976, the second time he had won this title.

Savoldi ended his career playing with Bologna once again, before finally returning to the club with which he had started his career, Atalanta, for one season (1982–83), in Serie B.

During his career in Serie A he made 405 appearances scoring 168 goals. During his career in Serie B he made 73 appearances scoring 18 goals.

== International career ==
In 1975, Savoldi made four appearances for the Italy national side, making his debut on 8 June in a 1–0 away defeat to the Soviet Union, in Moscow, also making two appearances in 1976 European Qualifying matches. He scored his only international goal from a penalty in a 3–2 friendly home win over Greece, on 30 December, which was his final international appearance.

== Style of play ==
A versatile and prolific forward, Savoldi was capable of playing anywhere along the front line; throughout his career he was deployed as a centre-forward, as a striker, as a left winger, or as an attacking midfielder. He was primarily known for his pace, strength, and in particular, his ability in the air as a goalscoring centre-forward, as well as his accuracy from penalties; with 45 goals from the spot, he is the fourth-most prolific penalty kick taker in Serie A history.

== Personal life and death ==
Savoldi was the father of former footballer Gianluca Savoldi, who also briefly played in the Serie A with Reggina and represented Napoli among other clubs in the Serie B.

Giuseppe Savoldi died in Bergamo on 26 March 2026, aged 79.

== Honours ==
Bologna

- Coppa Italia: 1969–70, 1973–74
- Anglo-Italian League Cup: 1970

Napoli

- Coppa Italia: 1975–76
- Anglo-Italian League Cup: 1976

Individual

- Coppa Italia top scorer: 1969–70, 1973–74, 1977–78
- Serie A top scorer: 1972–73
