= Carlo Tresoldi =

Italian footballer (1952–1995)

Personal information
- Date of birth: 6 October 1952
- Place of birth: Boltiere, Italy
- Date of death: 13 July 1995 (aged 42)
- Place of death: Milan, Italy
- Height: 1.75 m (5 ft 9 in)
- Position: Striker

Youth career
- 1968–1971: Milan

Senior career*
| Years | Team | Apps | (Gls) |
| 1972–1974 | Milan | 12 | (1) |
| 1974–1978 | Varese | 46 | (7) |
| 1978–1979 | Seregno | 19 | (6) |
| 1979–1980 | Grosseto | 19 | (3) |
| 1980–1982 | Varese | 12 | (1) |
- * Club domestic league appearances and goals

Carlo Tresoldi (born 6 October 1952 in Boltiere; died 13 July 1995 in Milan of cancer) was an Italian professional footballer who played as a forward.

He played 3 seasons (31 games, 4 goals) in the Serie A for A.C. Milan and Varese F.C.

== Honours ==
Milan

- Coppa Italia winner: 1971–72, 1972–73.
- UEFA Cup Winners' Cup winner: 1972–73, runners-up 1973–74.
