= Pierluigi Pizzaballa =

Italian footballer (born 1939)

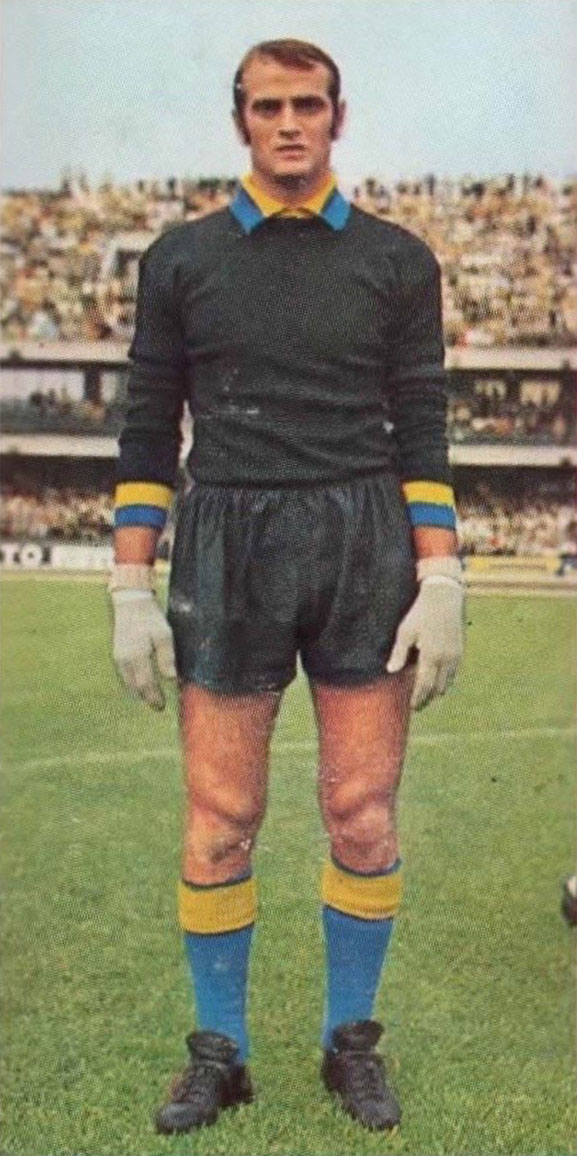
- Pizzaballa with Verona in 1970

Personal information
- Date of birth: 14 September 1939 (age 87)
- Place of birth: Bergamo, Italy
- Height: 1.75 m (5 ft 9 in)
- Position: Goalkeeper

Youth career
- 1958: Verdello

Senior career*
Years	Team	Apps	(Gls)
1958–1966	Atalanta	87	(0)
1966–1969	Roma	70	(0)
1969–1973	Verona	79	(0)
1973–1976	A.C. Milan	10	(0)
1976–1980	Atalanta	54	(0)
Total		300	(0)

International career
1966	Italy	1	(0)
- * Club domestic league appearances and goals

Pierluigi Pizzaballa (Italian pronunciation: [ˌpjɛrluˈiːdʒi pittsaˈballa]; born 14 September 1939) is an Italian former professional footballer who played as a goalkeeper.

== Club career ==
Pizzaballa started his club career with Atalanta, where he became one of Serie A's top Italian goalkeepers, before moving to Roma in 1966. He subsequently played for Hellas Verona and AC Milan, and he finished his career back at Atalanta, earning 275 appearances in Serie A. In his career he won four Coppa Italia trophies (one with Atalanta, one with Roma, and two with Milan), a Serie B title with Atalanta, and a European Cup Winners' Cup with Milan.

== International career ==
Pizzaballa earned one cap for the Italy national team on 18 June 1966, coming on as a substitute against Austria, and was in the Italian squad at the 1966 FIFA World Cup, although he did not play a match in the competition, as he was a backup to Enrico Albertosi. Although he was considered one of the best Italian goalkeepers of his generation, he received little space with the national side due to the presence of many other notable goalkeepers during his time, in addition to Albertosi, such as Lorenzo Buffon, Fabio Cudicini, Carlo Mattrel, Roberto Anzolin, Giuliano Sarti, Lido Vieri, and Dino Zoff.

== Personal life ==
In addition to his success and ability as a footballer, Pizzaballa also achieved fame throughout his career because of his iconic surname, and also as his Panini Italian footballing card was supposedly extremely difficult to obtain.

He is the uncle of Cardinal Pierbattista Pizzaballa, the Latin Patriarch of Jerusalem.

== Honours ==
Atalanta

- Serie B: 1958–59
- Coppa Italia: 1962–63

Roma

- Coppa Italia: 1968–69

A.C. Milan

- Coppa Italia: 1972–73, 1976–77
- UEFA Cup Winners' Cup: 1972–73
