= 1950 FIFA World Cup Group 3 =

Football tournament group stage

Group 3 of the 1950 FIFA World Cup took place from 25 June to 2 July 1950. The group consisted of Sweden, Italy, Paraguay, and India. However, India later withdrew from the group. The group winners advanced to the final round.

== Standings ==
Pos	Team	Pld	W	D	L	GF	GA	GD	Pts	Qualification
1	Sweden	2	1	1	0	5	4	+1	3	Advance to final round
2	Italy	2	1	0	1	4	3	+1	2	
3	Paraguay	2	0	1	1	2	4	−2	1	
4	India	0	0	0	0	0	0	0	0	Withdrew

Source: FIFA
Rules for classification: Tiebreakers

== Matches ==
All times listed are local time.

=== Sweden vs Italy ===
25 June 1950
15:00 BRT (UTC-3)

Sweden	3–2	Italy
Jeppson 25', 68'; Andersson 33'		Carapellese 7'; Muccinelli 75'

Estádio do Pacaembu, São Paulo
Attendance: 36,502
Referee: Jean Lutz (Switzerland)

Sweden
Italy

GK	Kalle Svensson
RB	Lennart Samuelsson
CB	Knut Nordahl
LB	Erik Nilsson (c)
RH	Sune Andersson
LH	Ingvar Gärd
OR	Stig Sundqvist
IR	Karl-Erik Palmér
CF	Hasse Jeppson
IL	Lennart Skoglund
OL	Stellan Nilsson
Manager:
(England) George Raynor

GK	Lucidio Sentimenti
RB	Attilio Giovannini
CB	Carlo Parola
LB	Zeffiro Furiassi
RH	Carlo Annovazzi
LH	Augusto Magli
OR	Ermes Muccinelli
IR	Giampiero Boniperti
CF	Gino Cappello
IL	Aldo Campatelli
OL	Riccardo Carapellese (c)
Manager:
Ferruccio Novo

=== Sweden vs Paraguay ===
29 June 1950
15:30 BRT (UTC-3)

Sweden	2–2	Paraguay
Sundqvist 17'; Palmér 26'		López Fretes 35'; López 74'

Estádio Vila Capanema, Curitiba
Attendance: 7,903
Referee: George Mitchell (Scotland)

Sweden
Paraguay

GK	Kalle Svensson
RB	Lennart Samuelsson
LB	Erik Nilsson (c)
RH	Knut Nordahl
CH	Sune Andersson
LH	Ingvar Gärd
OR	Stig Sundqvist
IR	Karl-Erik Palmér
CF	Hasse Jeppson
IL	Lennart Skoglund
OL	Egon Jönsson
Manager:
(England) George Raynor

GK	Marcelino Vargas
RB	Alberto González
CB	Casiano Céspedes
LB	Manuel Gavilán
RH	Victoriano Leguizamón
LH	Castor Cantero
OR	Enrique Ávalos
IR	Atilio López
CF	Darío Jara Saguier
IL	César López Fretes (c)
OL	Leongino Unzaim
Manager:
Manuel Fleitas Solich

=== Italy vs Paraguay ===
2 July 1950
15:00 BRT (UTC-3)

Italy	2–0	Paraguay
Carapellese 12'; Pandolfini 62'

Estádio do Pacaembu, São Paulo
Attendance: 25,811
Referee: Arthur Ellis (England)

Italy
Paraguay

GK	Giuseppe Moro
RB	Osvaldo Fattori
CB	Ivano Blason
LB	Zeffiro Furiassi
RH	Leandro Remondini
LH	Giacomo Mari
OR	Ermes Muccinelli
IR	Egisto Pandolfini
CF	Gino Cappello
IL	Amedeo Amadei
OL	Riccardo Carapellese (c)
Manager:
Ferruccio Novo

GK	Marcelino Vargas
RB	Alberto González
CB	Casiano Céspedes
LB	Manuel Gavilán
RH	Victoriano Leguizamón
LH	Castor Cantero
OR	Enrique Ávalos
IR	Atilio López
CF	Darío Jara Saguier
IL	César López Fretes (c)
OL	Leongino Unzaim
Manager:
Manuel Fleitas Solich

== See also ==
- Italy at the FIFA World Cup
- Paraguay at the FIFA World Cup
- Sweden at the FIFA World Cup
