= List of Italy national football team World Cup and European Championship squads =

The World Cup and European Championship, are the primary competitive tournaments the Italy national football team enters. The tournaments are held every four years in alternate even numbered years. Excluding the tournament years in which Italy either did not enter or failed to qualify for the finals, the Italy national team has nominated the following squads of players to compete in the tournaments:

== 1934 World Cup ==
- Progress: Winners

Head coach: Vittorio Pozzo

No.	Pos.	Player	Date of birth (age)	Caps	Club
-	DF	Luigi Allemandi	18 November 1903 (aged 30)	9	(Italy) Ambrosiana-Inter
-	FW	Pietro Arcari	2 December 1909 (aged 24)	0	(Italy) Milan
-	MF	Luigi Bertolini	13 September 1904 (aged 29)	19	(Italy) Juventus
-	FW	Felice Borel	5 April 1914 (aged 20)	2	(Italy) Juventus
-	DF	Umberto Caligaris	26 July 1901 (aged 32)	59	(Italy) Juventus
-	MF	Armando Castellazzi	7 October 1904 (aged 29)	2	(Italy) Ambrosiana-Inter
-	GK	Giuseppe Cavanna	18 September 1905 (aged 28)	0	(Italy) Napoli
-	GK	Gianpiero Combi (captain)	20 November 1902 (aged 31)	42	(Italy) Juventus
-	FW	Attilio Demaria	19 March 1909 (aged 25)	1	(Italy) Ambrosiana-Inter
-	FW	Giovanni Ferrari	6 December 1907 (aged 26)	19	(Italy) Juventus
-	MF	Attilio Ferraris	26 March 1904 (aged 30)	22	(Italy) Roma
-	FW	Enrique Guaita	11 July 1910 (aged 23)	2	(Italy) Roma
-	FW	Anfilogino Guarisi	26 December 1905 (aged 28)	5	(Italy) Lazio
-	GK	Guido Masetti	22 November 1907 (aged 26)	0	(Italy) Roma
-	MF	Giuseppe Meazza	23 August 1910 (aged 23)	22	(Italy) Ambrosiana-Inter
-	MF	Luis Monti	15 May 1901 (aged 33)	10	(Italy) Juventus
-	DF	Eraldo Monzeglio	5 June 1906 (aged 27)	12	(Italy) Bologna
-	FW	Raimundo Orsi	2 December 1901 (aged 32)	27	(Italy) Juventus
-	MF	Mario Pizziolo	7 December 1909 (aged 24)	8	(Italy) Fiorentina
-	DF	Virginio Rosetta	25 February 1902 (aged 32)	51	(Italy) Juventus
-	FW	Angelo Schiavio	15 October 1905 (aged 28)	17	(Italy) Bologna
-	MF	Mario Varglien	26 December 1905 (aged 28)	0	(Italy) Juventus

== 1938 World Cup ==
- Progress: Winners

Head coach: Vittorio Pozzo

No.	Pos.	Player	Date of birth (age)	Caps	Club
-	MF	Michele Andreolo	6 September 1912 (aged 25)	11	(Italy) Bologna
-	FW	Sergio Bertoni	23 September 1915 (aged 22)	3	(Italy) Pisa
-	FW	Amedeo Biavati	4 April 1915 (aged 23)	0	(Italy) Bologna
-	GK	Carlo Ceresoli	14 May 1910 (aged 28)	7	(Italy) Bologna
-	MF	Bruno Chizzo	19 April 1916 (aged 22)	0	(Italy) Triestina
-	FW	Gino Colaussi	4 March 1914 (aged 24)	12	(Italy) Triestina
-	MF	Aldo Donati	29 September 1910 (aged 27)	0	(Italy) Roma
-	FW	Giovanni Ferrari	6 December 1907 (aged 30)	38	(Italy) Ambrosiana-Inter
-	FW	Pietro Ferraris	15 February 1912 (aged 26)	3	(Italy) Ambrosiana-Inter
-	DF	Alfredo Foni	20 November 1911 (aged 26)	6	(Italy) Juventus
-	MF	Mario Genta	1 March 1912 (aged 26)	0	(Italy) Genoa
-	MF	Ugo Locatelli	5 February 1916 (aged 22)	7	(Italy) Ambrosiana-Inter
-	GK	Guido Masetti	22 November 1907 (aged 30)	1	(Italy) Roma
-	MF	Giuseppe Meazza (captain)	23 August 1910 (aged 27)	43	(Italy) Ambrosiana-Inter
-	DF	Eraldo Monzeglio	5 June 1906 (aged 31)	32	(Italy) Roma
-	GK	Aldo Olivieri	2 October 1910 (aged 27)	8	(Italy) Lucchese
-	MF	Renato Olmi	12 July 1914 (aged 23)	0	(Italy) Ambrosiana-Inter
-	FW	Pietro Pasinati	21 July 1910 (aged 27)	10	(Italy) Triestina
-	MF	Mario Perazzolo	7 June 1911 (aged 26)	2	(Italy) Genoa
-	FW	Silvio Piola	29 September 1913 (aged 24)	14	(Italy) Lazio
-	DF	Pietro Rava	21 January 1916 (aged 22)	11	(Italy) Juventus
-	MF	Pietro Serantoni	11 December 1906 (aged 31)	9	(Italy) Roma

== 1950 World Cup ==
- Progress: Group stage

Head coach: Ferruccio Novo

No.	Pos.	Player	Date of birth (age)	Caps	Club
-	FW	Amedeo Amadei	26 July 1921 (aged 28)	6	(Italy) Internazionale
-	DF	Carlo Annovazzi	24 May 1925 (aged 25)	10	(Italy) Milan
-	DF	Ivano Blason	24 May 1923 (aged 27)	0	(Italy) Triestina
-	FW	Giampiero Boniperti	4 July 1928 (aged 21)	6	(Italy) Juventus
-	FW	Aldo Campatelli	7 April 1919 (aged 31)	6	(Italy) Internazionale
-	FW	Gino Cappello	2 June 1920 (aged 30)	3	(Italy) Bologna
-	FW	Emilio Caprile	30 September 1928 (aged 21)	2	(Italy) Atalanta
-	FW	Riccardo Carapellese (captain)	1 July 1922 (aged 27)	11	(Italy) Torino
-	GK	Giuseppe Casari	10 April 1922 (aged 28)	2	(Italy) Atalanta
-	DF	Osvaldo Fattori	22 June 1922 (aged 28)	3	(Italy) Internazionale
-	DF	Zeffiro Furiassi	19 January 1923 (aged 27)	0	(Italy) Lazio
-	DF	Attilio Giovannini	30 July 1924 (aged 25)	4	(Italy) Internazionale
-	FW	Benito Lorenzi	20 December 1925 (aged 24)	5	(Italy) Internazionale
-	MF	Augusto Magli	9 March 1923 (aged 27)	0	(Italy) Fiorentina
-	MF	Giacomo Mari	17 October 1924 (aged 25)	3	(Italy) Juventus
-	GK	Giuseppe Moro	16 January 1921 (aged 29)	2	(Italy) Torino
-	FW	Ermes Muccinelli	28 July 1927 (aged 22)	2	(Italy) Juventus
-	FW	Egisto Pandolfini	19 February 1926 (aged 24)	0	(Italy) Fiorentina
-	MF	Carlo Parola	20 September 1921 (aged 28)	9	(Italy) Juventus
-	MF	Leandro Remondini	17 November 1917 (aged 32)	0	(Italy) Lazio
-	GK	Lucidio Sentimenti	1 July 1920 (aged 29)	7	(Italy) Lazio
-	MF	Omero Tognon	3 March 1924 (aged 26)	4	(Italy) Milan

== 1954 World Cup ==
- Progress: Group stage

Head coach: (Hungary) Lajos Czeizler

No.	Pos.	Player	Date of birth (age)	Caps	Club
1	GK	Giorgio Ghezzi	10 July 1930 (aged 23)	1	(Italy) Internazionale
2	DF	Guido Vincenzi	14 July 1932 (aged 21)	1	(Italy) Internazionale
3	DF	Giovanni Giacomazzi	18 January 1928 (aged 26)	1	(Italy) Internazionale
4	DF	Maino Neri	30 June 1924 (aged 29)	6	(Italy) Internazionale
5	MF	Omero Tognon	3 March 1924 (aged 30)	11	(Italy) Milan
6	MF	Fulvio Nesti	8 June 1925 (aged 29)	2	(Italy) Internazionale
7	FW	Ermes Muccinelli	28 July 1927 (aged 26)	9	(Italy) Juventus
8	FW	Egisto Pandolfini	19 February 1926 (aged 28)	14	(Italy) Roma
9	FW	Carlo Galli	6 March 1931 (aged 23)	2	(Italy) Roma
10	FW	Gino Cappello	2 June 1920 (aged 34)	10	(Italy) Bologna
11	FW	Benito Lorenzi	20 December 1925 (aged 28)	11	(Italy) Internazionale
12	GK	Giovanni Viola	26 June 1926 (aged 27)	0	(Italy) Juventus
13	DF	Ardico Magnini	21 October 1928 (aged 25)	4	(Italy) Fiorentina
14	DF	Sergio Cervato	22 March 1929 (aged 25)	11	(Italy) Fiorentina
15	DF	Giacomo Mari	17 October 1924 (aged 29)	7	(Italy) Juventus
16	MF	Rino Ferrario	7 December 1926 (aged 27)	1	(Italy) Juventus
17	FW	Armando Segato	3 May 1930 (aged 24)	3	(Italy) Fiorentina
18	MF	Gino Pivatelli	27 March 1933 (aged 21)	0	(Italy) Bologna
19	FW	Giampiero Boniperti (captain)	4 July 1928 (aged 25)	22	(Italy) Juventus
20	MF	Guido Gratton	23 September 1932 (aged 21)	1	(Italy) Fiorentina
21	FW	Amleto Frignani	5 March 1932 (aged 22)	6	(Italy) Milan
22	GK	Leonardo Costagliola	27 October 1921 (aged 32)	3	(Italy) Fiorentina

== 1962 World Cup ==
- Progress: Group stage

Head coach: Paolo Mazza and Giovanni Ferrari

No.	Pos.	Player	Date of birth (age)	Caps	Club
1	GK	Lorenzo Buffon (captain)	19 December 1929 (aged 32)	13	(Italy) Internazionale
2	DF	Giacomo Losi	9 November 1935 (aged 26)	9	(Italy) Roma
3	MF	Gigi Radice	15 January 1935 (aged 27)	2	(Italy) Milan
4	DF	Sandro Salvadore	29 November 1939 (aged 22)	5	(Italy) Milan
5	DF	Cesare Maldini	5 February 1932 (aged 30)	6	(Italy) Milan
6	MF	Giovanni Trapattoni	17 March 1939 (aged 23)	7	(Italy) Milan
7	FW	Bruno Mora	29 March 1937 (aged 25)	9	(Italy) Juventus
8	FW	Humberto Maschio	20 February 1933 (aged 29)	1	(Italy) Atalanta
9	FW	José Altafini	24 July 1938 (aged 23)	4	(Italy) Milan
10	FW	Omar Sívori	2 October 1935 (aged 26)	7	(Italy) Juventus
11	FW	Giampaolo Menichelli	29 June 1938 (aged 23)	2	(Italy) Roma
12	GK	Carlo Mattrel	14 April 1937 (aged 25)	1	(Italy) Palermo
13	GK	Enrico Albertosi	2 November 1939 (aged 22)	1	(Italy) Fiorentina
14	FW	Gianni Rivera	18 August 1943 (aged 18)	1	(Italy) Milan
15	FW	Angelo Sormani	3 July 1939 (aged 22)	0	(Italy) Mantova
16	DF	Enzo Robotti	13 June 1935 (aged 26)	6	(Italy) Fiorentina
17	FW	Ezio Pascutti	1 June 1937 (aged 24)	1	(Italy) Bologna
18	DF	Mario David	13 March 1934 (aged 28)	2	(Italy) Milan
19	DF	Francesco Janich	27 March 1937 (aged 25)	0	(Italy) Bologna
20	MF	Paride Tumburus	8 March 1939 (aged 23)	0	(Italy) Bologna
21	MF	Giorgio Ferrini	18 August 1939 (aged 22)	1	(Italy) Torino
22	FW	Giacomo Bulgarelli	24 October 1940 (aged 21)	0	(Italy) Bologna

== 1966 World Cup ==
- Progress: Group stage

Head coach: Edmondo Fabbri

No.	Pos.	Player	Date of birth (age)	Caps	Club
1	GK	Enrico Albertosi	2 November 1939 (aged 26)	10	(Italy) Fiorentina
2	GK	Roberto Anzolin	18 April 1938 (aged 28)	1	(Italy) Juventus
3	MF	Paolo Barison	23 June 1936 (aged 30)	7	(Italy) Roma
4	MF	Giacomo Bulgarelli	24 October 1940 (aged 25)	24	(Italy) Bologna
5	DF	Tarcisio Burgnich	25 April 1939 (aged 27)	12	(Italy) Internazionale
6	DF	Giacinto Facchetti	18 July 1942 (aged 23)	21	(Italy) Internazionale
7	MF	Romano Fogli	21 January 1938 (aged 28)	11	(Italy) Bologna
8	DF	Aristide Guarneri	7 March 1938 (aged 28)	12	(Italy) Internazionale
9	DF	Francesco Janich	27 March 1937 (aged 29)	5	(Italy) Bologna
10	FW	Antonio Juliano	1 January 1943 (aged 23)	1	(Italy) Napoli
11	DF	Spartaco Landini	31 January 1944 (aged 22)	1	(Italy) Internazionale
12	MF	Gianfranco Leoncini	25 September 1939 (aged 26)	1	(Italy) Juventus
13	MF	Giovanni Lodetti	10 August 1942 (aged 23)	12	(Italy) Milan
14	FW	Sandro Mazzola	8 November 1942 (aged 23)	19	(Italy) Internazionale
15	FW	Luigi Meroni	24 February 1943 (aged 23)	5	(Italy) Torino
16	FW	Ezio Pascutti	1 June 1937 (aged 29)	15	(Italy) Bologna
17	MF	Marino Perani	27 October 1939 (aged 26)	2	(Italy) Bologna
18	GK	Pierluigi Pizzaballa	14 September 1939 (aged 26)	1	(Italy) Atalanta
19	FW	Gianni Rivera	18 August 1943 (aged 22)	23	(Italy) Milan
20	FW	Francesco Rizzo	30 May 1943 (aged 23)	2	(Italy) Cagliari
21	DF	Roberto Rosato	18 August 1943 (aged 22)	12	(Italy) Torino
22	DF	Sandro Salvadore (captain)	29 November 1939 (aged 26)	27	(Italy) Juventus

== 1968 European Championship ==
- Progress: Winners

Head coach: Ferruccio Valcareggi

No.	Pos.	Player	Date of birth (age)	Caps	Club
1	GK	Enrico Albertosi	2 November 1939 (aged 28)	18	(Italy) Fiorentina
2	FW	Pietro Anastasi	7 April 1948 (aged 20)	0	(Italy) Varese
3	DF	Angelo Anquilletti	25 April 1943 (aged 25)	0	(Italy) Milan
4	DF	Giancarlo Bercellino	9 October 1941 (aged 26)	5	(Italy) Juventus
5	DF	Tarcisio Burgnich	25 April 1939 (aged 29)	21	(Italy) Internazionale
6	FW	Giacomo Bulgarelli	24 October 1940 (aged 27)	29	(Italy) Bologna
7	DF	Ernesto Castano	2 May 1939 (aged 29)	2	(Italy) Juventus
8	MF	Giancarlo De Sisti	13 March 1943 (aged 25)	2	(Italy) Fiorentina
9	FW	Angelo Domenghini	25 August 1941 (aged 26)	12	(Italy) Internazionale
10	DF	Giacinto Facchetti (captain)	18 July 1942 (aged 25)	34	(Italy) Internazionale
11	MF	Giorgio Ferrini	18 August 1939 (aged 28)	5	(Italy) Torino
12	MF	Aristide Guarneri	7 March 1938 (aged 30)	19	(Italy) Bologna
13	MF	Antonio Juliano	1 January 1943 (aged 25)	10	(Italy) Napoli
14	MF	Giovanni Lodetti	10 August 1942 (aged 25)	16	(Italy) Milan
15	FW	Sandro Mazzola	8 November 1942 (aged 25)	29	(Italy) Internazionale
16	FW	Pierino Prati	13 December 1946 (aged 21)	2	(Italy) Milan
17	FW	Gigi Riva	7 November 1944 (aged 23)	6	(Italy) Cagliari
18	MF	Gianni Rivera	18 August 1943 (aged 24)	31	(Italy) Milan
19	DF	Roberto Rosato	18 August 1943 (aged 24)	15	(Italy) Milan
20	DF	Sandro Salvadore	29 November 1939 (aged 28)	29	(Italy) Juventus
21	GK	Lido Vieri	16 July 1939 (aged 28)	4	(Italy) Torino
22	GK	Dino Zoff	28 February 1942 (aged 26)	1	(Italy) Napoli

== 1970 World Cup ==
- Progress: Runners-up

Head coach: Ferruccio Valcareggi

No.	Pos.	Player	Date of birth (age)	Caps	Club
1	GK	Enrico Albertosi	2 November 1939 (aged 30)	21	(Italy) Cagliari
2	DF	Tarcisio Burgnich	25 April 1939 (aged 31)	33	(Italy) Internazionale
3	DF	Giacinto Facchetti (captain)	18 July 1942 (aged 27)	46	(Italy) Internazionale
4	DF	Fabrizio Poletti	13 July 1943 (aged 26)	4	(Italy) Torino
5	DF	Pierluigi Cera	25 February 1941 (aged 29)	2	(Italy) Cagliari
6	MF	Ugo Ferrante	18 July 1945 (aged 24)	1	(Italy) Fiorentina
7	MF	Comunardo Niccolai	15 December 1946 (aged 23)	1	(Italy) Cagliari
8	MF	Roberto Rosato	18 August 1943 (aged 26)	18	(Italy) Milan
9	MF	Giorgio Puia	8 March 1938 (aged 32)	7	(Italy) Torino
10	DF	Mario Bertini	7 January 1944 (aged 26)	9	(Italy) Internazionale
11	FW	Gigi Riva	7 November 1944 (aged 25)	16	(Italy) Cagliari
12	GK	Dino Zoff	28 February 1942 (aged 28)	10	(Italy) Napoli
13	FW	Angelo Domenghini	25 August 1941 (aged 28)	22	(Italy) Cagliari
14	MF	Gianni Rivera	18 August 1942 (aged 27)	38	(Italy) Milan
15	MF	Sandro Mazzola	8 November 1942 (aged 27)	37	(Italy) Internazionale
16	MF	Giancarlo De Sisti	13 March 1943 (aged 27)	12	(Italy) Fiorentina
17	GK	Lido Vieri	16 July 1939 (aged 30)	4	(Italy) Internazionale
18	DF	Antonio Juliano	1 January 1943 (aged 27)	14	(Italy) Napoli
19	FW	Sergio Gori	24 February 1946 (aged 24)	0	(Italy) Cagliari
20	FW	Roberto Boninsegna	13 November 1943 (aged 26)	1	(Italy) Internazionale
21	DF	Giuseppe Furino	5 July 1946 (aged 23)	0	(Italy) Juventus
22	FW	Pierino Prati	13 December 1946 (aged 23)	6	(Italy) Milan

== 1974 World Cup ==
- Progress: Group stage

Head coach: Ferruccio Valcareggi

No.	Pos.	Player	Date of birth (age)	Caps	Club
1	GK	Dino Zoff	28 February 1942 (aged 32)	32	(Italy) Juventus
2	DF	Luciano Spinosi	9 May 1950 (aged 24)	16	(Italy) Juventus
3	DF	Giacinto Facchetti (captain)	18 July 1942 (aged 31)	73	(Italy) Internazionale
4	MF	Romeo Benetti	20 October 1945 (aged 28)	15	(Italy) Milan
5	DF	Francesco Morini	12 August 1944 (aged 29)	6	(Italy) Juventus
6	DF	Tarcisio Burgnich	25 April 1939 (aged 35)	63	(Italy) Internazionale
7	MF	Sandro Mazzola	8 November 1942 (aged 31)	67	(Italy) Internazionale
8	MF	Fabio Capello	18 June 1946 (aged 27)	16	(Italy) Juventus
9	FW	Giorgio Chinaglia	24 January 1947 (aged 27)	9	(Italy) Lazio
10	MF	Gianni Rivera	18 August 1943 (aged 30)	58	(Italy) Milan
11	FW	Gigi Riva	7 November 1944 (aged 29)	40	(Italy) Cagliari
12	GK	Enrico Albertosi	2 November 1939 (aged 34)	34	(Italy) Cagliari
13	DF	Giuseppe Sabadini	26 March 1949 (aged 25)	4	(Italy) Milan
14	DF	Mauro Bellugi	7 February 1950 (aged 24)	7	(Italy) Internazionale
15	DF	Giuseppe Wilson	27 October 1945 (aged 28)	1	(Italy) Lazio
16	MF	Antonio Juliano	1 January 1943 (aged 31)	17	(Italy) Napoli
17	MF	Luciano Re Cecconi	1 December 1948 (aged 25)	0	(Italy) Lazio
18	MF	Franco Causio	1 February 1949 (aged 25)	10	(Italy) Juventus
19	FW	Pietro Anastasi	7 April 1948 (aged 26)	20	(Italy) Juventus
20	FW	Roberto Boninsegna	13 November 1943 (aged 30)	18	(Italy) Internazionale
21	FW	Paolo Pulici	27 April 1950 (aged 24)	3	(Italy) Torino
22	GK	Luciano Castellini	12 December 1945 (aged 28)	0	(Italy) Torino

== 1978 World Cup ==
- Progress: Fourth place

Head coach: Enzo Bearzot

No.	Pos.	Player	Date of birth (age)	Caps	Club
1	GK	Dino Zoff (captain)	28 February 1942 (aged 36)	63	(Italy) Juventus
2	DF	Mauro Bellugi	7 February 1950 (aged 28)	22	(Italy) Bologna
3	DF	Antonio Cabrini	8 October 1957 (aged 20)	0	(Italy) Juventus
4	DF	Antonello Cuccureddu	4 October 1949 (aged 28)	6	(Italy) Juventus
5	DF	Claudio Gentile	27 September 1953 (aged 24)	16	(Italy) Juventus
6	DF	Aldo Maldera	14 October 1953 (aged 24)	5	(Italy) Milan
7	DF	Lionello Manfredonia	27 November 1956 (aged 21)	3	(Italy) Lazio
8	DF	Gaetano Scirea	25 May 1953 (aged 25)	9	(Italy) Juventus
9	MF	Giancarlo Antognoni	1 April 1954 (aged 24)	28	(Italy) Fiorentina
10	MF	Romeo Benetti	20 October 1945 (aged 32)	40	(Italy) Juventus
11	MF	Eraldo Pecci	12 April 1955 (aged 23)	5	(Italy) Torino
12	GK	Paolo Conti	1 April 1950 (aged 28)	2	(Italy) Roma
13	MF	Patrizio Sala	16 June 1955 (aged 22)	5	(Italy) Torino
14	MF	Marco Tardelli	24 September 1954 (aged 23)	19	(Italy) Juventus
15	MF	Renato Zaccarelli	18 January 1951 (aged 27)	14	(Italy) Torino
16	MF	Franco Causio	1 February 1949 (aged 29)	33	(Italy) Juventus
17	MF	Claudio Sala	8 September 1947 (aged 30)	15	(Italy) Torino
18	FW	Roberto Bettega	27 December 1950 (aged 27)	16	(Italy) Juventus
19	FW	Francesco Graziani	16 December 1952 (aged 25)	22	(Italy) Torino
20	FW	Paolo Pulici	27 April 1950 (aged 28)	18	(Italy) Torino
21	FW	Paolo Rossi	23 September 1956 (aged 21)	2	(Italy) Vicenza
22	GK	Ivano Bordon	13 April 1951 (aged 27)	1	(Italy) Internazionale

== 1980 European Championship ==
- Progress: Fourth place

Head coach: Enzo Bearzot

No.	Pos.	Player	Date of birth (age)	Caps	Club
1	GK	Dino Zoff (captain)	28 February 1942 (aged 38)	80	(Italy) Juventus
2	DF	Franco Baresi	8 May 1960 (aged 20)	0	(Italy) Milan
3	DF	Giuseppe Baresi	7 February 1958 (aged 22)	1	(Italy) Internazionale
4	DF	Mauro Bellugi	7 February 1950 (aged 30)	32	(Italy) Napoli
5	DF	Antonio Cabrini	8 October 1957 (aged 22)	17	(Italy) Juventus
6	DF	Fulvio Collovati	9 May 1957 (aged 23)	8	(Italy) Milan
7	DF	Claudio Gentile	27 September 1953 (aged 26)	35	(Italy) Juventus
8	DF	Aldo Maldera	14 October 1953 (aged 26)	10	(Italy) Milan
9	DF	Gaetano Scirea	25 May 1953 (aged 27)	28	(Italy) Juventus
10	MF	Giancarlo Antognoni	1 April 1954 (aged 26)	43	(Italy) Fiorentina
11	MF	Romeo Benetti	20 October 1945 (aged 34)	51	(Italy) Roma
12	GK	Ivano Bordon	13 April 1951 (aged 29)	5	(Italy) Internazionale
13	MF	Ruben Buriani	16 March 1955 (aged 25)	2	(Italy) Milan
14	MF	Gabriele Oriali	25 November 1952 (aged 27)	9	(Italy) Internazionale
15	MF	Marco Tardelli	24 September 1954 (aged 25)	36	(Italy) Juventus
16	MF	Renato Zaccarelli	18 January 1951 (aged 29)	23	(Italy) Torino
17	FW	Alessandro Altobelli	28 November 1955 (aged 24)	0	(Italy) Internazionale
18	FW	Roberto Bettega	27 December 1950 (aged 29)	30	(Italy) Juventus
19	FW	Franco Causio	1 February 1949 (aged 31)	51	(Italy) Juventus
20	FW	Francesco Graziani	16 December 1952 (aged 27)	34	(Italy) Torino
21	FW	Roberto Pruzzo	1 April 1955 (aged 25)	1	(Italy) Roma
22	GK	Giovanni Galli	29 April 1958 (aged 22)	0	(Italy) Fiorentina

== 1982 World Cup ==
- Progress: Winners

Head coach: Enzo Bearzot

No.	Pos.	Player	Date of birth (age)	Caps	Club
1	GK	Dino Zoff (captain)	28 February 1942 (aged 40)	99	(Italy) Juventus
2	DF	Franco Baresi	8 May 1960 (aged 22)	0	(Italy) Milan
3	DF	Giuseppe Bergomi	22 December 1963 (aged 18)	1	(Italy) Internazionale
4	DF	Antonio Cabrini	8 October 1957 (aged 24)	33	(Italy) Juventus
5	DF	Fulvio Collovati	9 May 1957 (aged 25)	26	(Italy) Milan
6	DF	Claudio Gentile	27 September 1953 (aged 28)	56	(Italy) Juventus
7	DF	Gaetano Scirea	25 May 1953 (aged 29)	49	(Italy) Juventus
8	DF	Pietro Vierchowod	6 April 1959 (aged 23)	2	(Italy) Fiorentina
9	MF	Giancarlo Antognoni	1 April 1954 (aged 28)	60	(Italy) Fiorentina
10	MF	Giuseppe Dossena	2 May 1958 (aged 24)	9	(Italy) Torino
11	MF	Giampiero Marini	25 February 1951 (aged 31)	11	(Italy) Internazionale
12	GK	Ivano Bordon	13 April 1951 (aged 31)	13	(Italy) Internazionale
13	MF	Gabriele Oriali	25 November 1952 (aged 29)	20	(Italy) Internazionale
14	MF	Marco Tardelli	24 September 1954 (aged 27)	55	(Italy) Juventus
15	MF	Franco Causio	1 February 1949 (aged 33)	58	(Italy) Udinese
16	MF	Bruno Conti	13 March 1955 (aged 27)	13	(Italy) Roma
17	FW	Daniele Massaro	23 May 1961 (aged 21)	1	(Italy) Fiorentina
18	FW	Alessandro Altobelli	28 November 1955 (aged 26)	10	(Italy) Internazionale
19	FW	Francesco Graziani	16 December 1952 (aged 29)	53	(Italy) Fiorentina
20	FW	Paolo Rossi	23 September 1956 (aged 25)	20	(Italy) Juventus
21	FW	Franco Selvaggi	15 May 1953 (aged 29)	3	(Italy) Cagliari
22	GK	Giovanni Galli	29 April 1958 (aged 24)	0	(Italy) Fiorentina

== 1986 World Cup ==
- Progress: Round of 16

Head coach: Enzo Bearzot

No.	Pos.	Player	Date of birth (age)	Caps	Club
1	GK	Giovanni Galli	29 April 1958 (aged 28)	15	(Italy) Milan
2	DF	Giuseppe Bergomi	22 December 1963 (aged 22)	28	(Italy) Internazionale
3	DF	Antonio Cabrini	8 October 1957 (aged 28)	64	(Italy) Juventus
4	DF	Fulvio Collovati	9 May 1957 (aged 29)	49	(Italy) Internazionale
5	DF	Sebastiano Nela	13 March 1961 (aged 25)	2	(Italy) Roma
6	DF	Gaetano Scirea (captain)	25 May 1953 (aged 33)	74	(Italy) Juventus
7	DF	Roberto Tricella	18 March 1959 (aged 27)	6	(Italy) Verona
8	DF	Pietro Vierchowod	6 April 1959 (aged 27)	23	(Italy) Sampdoria
9	MF	Carlo Ancelotti	10 June 1959 (aged 26)	11	(Italy) Roma
10	MF	Salvatore Bagni	25 September 1956 (aged 29)	26	(Italy) Napoli
11	MF	Giuseppe Baresi	7 February 1958 (aged 28)	15	(Italy) Internazionale
12	GK	Franco Tancredi	10 January 1955 (aged 31)	12	(Italy) Roma
13	MF	Fernando De Napoli	15 March 1964 (aged 22)	1	(Italy) Avellino
14	MF	Antonio Di Gennaro	5 October 1958 (aged 27)	11	(Italy) Verona
15	MF	Marco Tardelli	24 September 1954 (aged 31)	81	(Italy) Internazionale
16	MF	Bruno Conti	13 March 1955 (aged 31)	43	(Italy) Roma
17	FW	Gianluca Vialli	9 July 1964 (aged 21)	4	(Italy) Sampdoria
18	FW	Alessandro Altobelli	28 November 1955 (aged 30)	39	(Italy) Internazionale
19	FW	Giuseppe Galderisi	22 March 1963 (aged 23)	6	(Italy) Verona
20	FW	Paolo Rossi	23 September 1956 (aged 29)	48	(Italy) Milan
21	FW	Aldo Serena	25 June 1960 (aged 25)	5	(Italy) Juventus
22	GK	Walter Zenga	30 April 1960 (aged 26)	0	(Italy) Internazionale

== 1988 European Championship ==
- Progress: Semi-finals

Head coach: Azeglio Vicini

No.	Pos.	Player	Date of birth (age)	Caps	Club
1	GK	Walter Zenga	28 April 1960 (aged 28)	17	(Italy) Internazionale
2	DF	Franco Baresi	8 May 1960 (aged 28)	21	(Italy) Milan
3	DF	Giuseppe Bergomi (captain)	22 December 1963 (aged 24)	46	(Italy) Internazionale
4	DF	Roberto Cravero	3 January 1964 (aged 24)	0	(Italy) Torino
5	DF	Ciro Ferrara	11 February 1967 (aged 21)	4	(Italy) Napoli
6	DF	Riccardo Ferri	20 August 1963 (aged 24)	12	(Italy) Internazionale
7	DF	Giovanni Francini	3 August 1963 (aged 24)	7	(Italy) Napoli
8	DF	Paolo Maldini	26 June 1968 (aged 19)	3	(Italy) Milan
9	MF	Carlo Ancelotti	10 June 1959 (aged 29)	17	(Italy) Milan
10	MF	Luigi De Agostini	7 April 1963 (aged 25)	10	(Italy) Juventus
11	MF	Fernando De Napoli	15 March 1964 (aged 24)	21	(Italy) Napoli
12	GK	Stefano Tacconi	13 May 1957 (aged 31)	1	(Italy) Juventus
13	MF	Luca Fusi	7 June 1963 (aged 25)	1	(Italy) Sampdoria
14	MF	Giuseppe Giannini	20 August 1964 (aged 23)	15	(Italy) Roma
15	MF	Francesco Romano	25 April 1960 (aged 28)	0	(Italy) Napoli
16	FW	Alessandro Altobelli	28 November 1955 (aged 32)	57	(Italy) Internazionale
17	MF	Roberto Donadoni	9 September 1963 (aged 24)	16	(Italy) Milan
18	FW	Roberto Mancini	27 November 1964 (aged 23)	13	(Italy) Sampdoria
19	FW	Ruggiero Rizzitelli	2 September 1967 (aged 20)	2	(Italy) Cesena
20	FW	Gianluca Vialli	9 July 1964 (aged 23)	25	(Italy) Sampdoria

== 1990 World Cup ==
- Progress: Third place

Head coach: Azeglio Vicini

No.	Pos.	Player	Date of birth (age)	Caps	Club
1	GK	Walter Zenga	28 April 1960 (aged 30)	35	(Italy) Internazionale
2	DF	Franco Baresi	8 May 1960 (aged 30)	39	(Italy) Milan
3	DF	Giuseppe Bergomi (captain)	22 December 1963 (aged 26)	65	(Italy) Internazionale
4	DF	Luigi De Agostini	7 April 1961 (aged 29)	24	(Italy) Juventus
5	DF	Ciro Ferrara	11 February 1967 (aged 23)	16	(Italy) Napoli
6	DF	Riccardo Ferri	20 August 1963 (aged 26)	29	(Italy) Internazionale
7	DF	Paolo Maldini	26 June 1968 (aged 21)	19	(Italy) Milan
8	DF	Pietro Vierchowod	6 April 1959 (aged 31)	29	(Italy) Sampdoria
9	MF	Carlo Ancelotti	10 June 1959 (aged 30)	22	(Italy) Milan
10	MF	Nicola Berti	14 April 1967 (aged 23)	11	(Italy) Internazionale
11	MF	Fernando De Napoli	15 March 1964 (aged 26)	38	(Italy) Napoli
12	GK	Stefano Tacconi	13 May 1957 (aged 33)	5	(Italy) Juventus
13	MF	Giuseppe Giannini	20 August 1964 (aged 25)	34	(Italy) Roma
14	MF	Giancarlo Marocchi	4 July 1965 (aged 24)	7	(Italy) Juventus
15	FW	Roberto Baggio	18 February 1967 (aged 23)	8	(Italy) Fiorentina
16	FW	Andrea Carnevale	12 January 1961 (aged 29)	8	(Italy) Napoli
17	MF	Roberto Donadoni	9 September 1963 (aged 26)	29	(Italy) Milan
18	FW	Roberto Mancini	27 November 1964 (aged 25)	20	(Italy) Sampdoria
19	FW	Salvatore Schillaci	1 December 1964 (aged 25)	1	(Italy) Juventus
20	FW	Aldo Serena	25 June 1960 (aged 29)	18	(Italy) Internazionale
21	FW	Gianluca Vialli	9 July 1964 (aged 25)	42	(Italy) Sampdoria
22	GK	Gianluca Pagliuca	18 December 1966 (aged 23)	0	(Italy) Sampdoria

== 1994 World Cup ==
- Progress: Runners-up

Head coach: Arrigo Sacchi

No.	Pos.	Player	Date of birth (age)	Caps	Club
1	GK	Gianluca Pagliuca	18 December 1966 (aged 27)	18	(Italy) Sampdoria
2	DF	Luigi Apolloni	2 May 1967 (aged 27)	1	(Italy) Parma
3	DF	Antonio Benarrivo	21 August 1968 (aged 25)	8	(Italy) Parma
4	DF	Alessandro Costacurta	24 April 1966 (aged 28)	20	(Italy) Milan
5	DF	Paolo Maldini	26 June 1968 (aged 25)	51	(Italy) Milan
6	DF	Franco Baresi (captain)	8 May 1960 (aged 34)	77	(Italy) Milan
7	DF	Lorenzo Minotti	8 February 1967 (aged 27)	2	(Italy) Parma
8	DF	Roberto Mussi	25 August 1963 (aged 30)	2	(Italy) Torino
9	DF	Mauro Tassotti	19 January 1960 (aged 34)	5	(Italy) Milan
10	FW	Roberto Baggio	18 February 1967 (aged 27)	36	(Italy) Juventus
11	MF	Demetrio Albertini	23 August 1971 (aged 22)	15	(Italy) Milan
12	GK	Luca Marchegiani	22 February 1966 (aged 28)	5	(Italy) Lazio
13	MF	Dino Baggio	24 July 1971 (aged 22)	13	(Italy) Juventus
14	MF	Nicola Berti	14 April 1967 (aged 27)	26	(Italy) Internazionale
15	MF	Antonio Conte	31 July 1969 (aged 24)	1	(Italy) Juventus
16	MF	Roberto Donadoni	9 September 1963 (aged 30)	51	(Italy) Milan
17	MF	Alberigo Evani	1 January 1963 (aged 31)	11	(Italy) Sampdoria
18	FW	Pierluigi Casiraghi	4 March 1969 (aged 25)	16	(Italy) Lazio
19	FW	Daniele Massaro	23 May 1961 (aged 33)	9	(Italy) Milan
20	FW	Giuseppe Signori	17 February 1968 (aged 26)	16	(Italy) Lazio
21	FW	Gianfranco Zola	5 July 1966 (aged 27)	6	(Italy) Parma
22	GK	Luca Bucci	13 March 1969 (aged 25)	0	(Italy) Parma

== 1996 European Championship ==
- Progress: Group stage

Head coach: Arrigo Sacchi

No.	Pos.	Player	Date of birth (age)	Caps	Club
1	GK	Angelo Peruzzi	16 February 1970 (aged 26)	8	(Italy) Juventus
2	DF	Luigi Apolloni	2 May 1967 (aged 29)	13	(Italy) Parma
3	DF	Paolo Maldini (captain)	26 June 1968 (aged 27)	69	(Italy) Milan
4	DF	Amedeo Carboni	6 April 1965 (aged 31)	12	(Italy) Roma
5	DF	Alessandro Costacurta	24 April 1966 (aged 30)	36	(Italy) Milan
6	DF	Alessandro Nesta	19 March 1976 (aged 20)	0	(Italy) Lazio
7	MF	Roberto Donadoni	9 September 1963 (aged 32)	60	(United States) New York MetroStars
8	DF	Roberto Mussi	25 August 1963 (aged 32)	8	(Italy) Parma
9	DF	Moreno Torricelli	23 January 1970 (aged 26)	4	(Italy) Juventus
10	MF	Demetrio Albertini	23 August 1971 (aged 24)	40	(Italy) Milan
11	MF	Dino Baggio	24 July 1971 (aged 24)	34	(Italy) Parma
12	GK	Francesco Toldo	2 December 1971 (aged 24)	3	(Italy) Fiorentina
13	MF	Fabio Rossitto	21 September 1971 (aged 24)	1	(Italy) Udinese
14	FW	Alessandro Del Piero	9 November 1974 (aged 21)	10	(Italy) Juventus
15	MF	Angelo Di Livio	26 July 1966 (aged 29)	5	(Italy) Juventus
16	MF	Roberto Di Matteo	29 May 1970 (aged 26)	14	(Italy) Lazio
17	MF	Diego Fuser	11 November 1968 (aged 27)	5	(Italy) Lazio
18	FW	Pierluigi Casiraghi	4 March 1969 (aged 27)	32	(Italy) Lazio
19	FW	Enrico Chiesa	29 December 1970 (aged 25)	2	(Italy) Sampdoria
20	FW	Fabrizio Ravanelli	12 November 1968 (aged 27)	10	(Italy) Juventus
21	FW	Gianfranco Zola	5 July 1966 (aged 29)	14	(Italy) Parma
22	GK	Luca Bucci	13 March 1969 (aged 27)	3	(Italy) Parma

== 1998 World Cup ==
Goalkeeper Angelo Peruzzi was originally named in the final list, but suffered an injury before the tournament; he was replaced in the squad by Francesco Toldo.

- Progress: Quarter-finals

Head coach: Cesare Maldini

No.	Pos.	Player	Date of birth (age)	Caps	Club
1	GK	Francesco Toldo	2 December 1971 (aged 26)	6	(Italy) Fiorentina
2	DF	Giuseppe Bergomi	22 December 1963 (aged 34)	78	(Italy) Internazionale
3	DF	Paolo Maldini (captain)	26 June 1968 (aged 29)	88	(Italy) Milan
4	DF	Fabio Cannavaro	13 September 1973 (aged 24)	14	(Italy) Parma
5	DF	Alessandro Costacurta	24 April 1966 (aged 32)	54	(Italy) Milan
6	DF	Alessandro Nesta	19 March 1976 (aged 22)	12	(Italy) Lazio
7	DF	Gianluca Pessotto	11 August 1970 (aged 27)	4	(Italy) Juventus
8	DF	Moreno Torricelli	23 January 1970 (aged 28)	6	(Italy) Juventus
9	MF	Demetrio Albertini	23 August 1971 (aged 26)	57	(Italy) Milan
10	FW	Alessandro Del Piero	9 November 1974 (aged 23)	19	(Italy) Juventus
11	MF	Dino Baggio	24 July 1971 (aged 26)	46	(Italy) Parma
12	GK	Gianluca Pagliuca	18 December 1966 (aged 31)	34	(Italy) Internazionale
13	MF	Sandro Cois	9 June 1972 (aged 26)	1	(Italy) Fiorentina
14	MF	Luigi Di Biagio	3 June 1971 (aged 27)	13	(Italy) Roma
15	MF	Angelo Di Livio	26 July 1966 (aged 31)	21	(Italy) Juventus
16	MF	Roberto Di Matteo	29 May 1970 (aged 28)	32	(England) Chelsea
17	MF	Francesco Moriero	31 March 1969 (aged 29)	3	(Italy) Internazionale
18	FW	Roberto Baggio	18 February 1967 (aged 31)	48	(Italy) Bologna
19	FW	Filippo Inzaghi	9 August 1973 (aged 24)	4	(Italy) Juventus
20	FW	Enrico Chiesa	29 December 1970 (aged 27)	6	(Italy) Parma
21	FW	Christian Vieri	12 July 1973 (aged 24)	8	(Spain) Atlético Madrid
22	GK	Gianluigi Buffon	28 January 1978 (aged 20)	2	(Italy) Parma

== 2000 European Championship ==
Italy named an initial 26-man squad for the tournament on 18 May 2000. Midfielders Dino Baggio and Diego Fuser, and defender Giuseppe Pancaro did not make the cut for the final 22, while forward Christian Vieri was ruled out through injury. Goalkeeper Gianluigi Buffon was originally named in the final list, but suffered a broken hand in a warm-up friendly against Norway on 3 June 2000; he was replaced in the squad by Christian Abbiati.

- Progress: Runners-up

Head coach: Dino Zoff

No.	Pos.	Player	Date of birth (age)	Caps	Club
1	GK	Christian Abbiati	8 July 1977 (aged 22)	0	(Italy) Milan
2	DF	Ciro Ferrara	11 February 1967 (aged 33)	48	(Italy) Juventus
3	DF	Paolo Maldini (captain)	26 June 1968 (aged 31)	105	(Italy) Milan
4	MF	Demetrio Albertini	23 August 1971 (aged 28)	67	(Italy) Milan
5	DF	Fabio Cannavaro	13 September 1973 (aged 26)	35	(Italy) Parma
6	DF	Paolo Negro	16 April 1972 (aged 28)	7	(Italy) Lazio
7	MF	Angelo Di Livio	26 July 1966 (aged 33)	27	(Italy) Fiorentina
8	MF	Antonio Conte	31 July 1969 (aged 30)	17	(Italy) Juventus
9	FW	Filippo Inzaghi	9 August 1973 (aged 26)	21	(Italy) Juventus
10	FW	Alessandro Del Piero	9 November 1974 (aged 25)	30	(Italy) Juventus
11	DF	Gianluca Pessotto	11 August 1970 (aged 29)	15	(Italy) Juventus
12	GK	Francesco Toldo	2 December 1971 (aged 28)	8	(Italy) Fiorentina
13	DF	Alessandro Nesta	19 March 1976 (aged 24)	25	(Italy) Lazio
14	MF	Luigi Di Biagio	3 June 1971 (aged 29)	15	(Italy) Internazionale
15	DF	Mark Iuliano	12 August 1973 (aged 26)	5	(Italy) Juventus
16	MF	Massimo Ambrosini	29 May 1977 (aged 23)	5	(Italy) Milan
17	MF	Gianluca Zambrotta	19 February 1977 (aged 23)	6	(Italy) Juventus
18	MF	Stefano Fiore	17 April 1975 (aged 25)	4	(Italy) Udinese
19	FW	Vincenzo Montella	18 June 1974 (aged 25)	4	(Italy) Roma
20	FW	Francesco Totti	27 September 1976 (aged 23)	13	(Italy) Roma
21	FW	Marco Delvecchio	7 April 1973 (aged 27)	4	(Italy) Roma
22	GK	Francesco Antonioli	14 September 1969 (aged 30)	0	(Italy) Roma

== 2002 World Cup ==
Roberto Baggio was controversially excluded from the squad by coach Giovanni Trapattoni, who believed him to not have fully recovered from the serious injury he had sustained during the season although he was initially keen to include Baggio in the final 23-man list.

- Progress: Round of 16

Head coach: Giovanni Trapattoni

No.	Pos.	Player	Date of birth (age)	Caps	Club
1	GK	Gianluigi Buffon	28 January 1978 (aged 24)	26	(Italy) Juventus
2	DF	Christian Panucci	12 April 1973 (aged 29)	24	(Italy) Roma
3	DF	Paolo Maldini (captain)	26 June 1968 (aged 33)	122	(Italy) Milan
4	DF	Francesco Coco	8 January 1977 (aged 25)	13	(Spain) Barcelona
5	DF	Fabio Cannavaro	13 September 1973 (aged 28)	58	(Italy) Parma
6	MF	Cristiano Zanetti	14 April 1977 (aged 25)	4	(Italy) Internazionale
7	FW	Alessandro Del Piero	9 November 1974 (aged 27)	49	(Italy) Juventus
8	MF	Gennaro Gattuso	9 January 1978 (aged 24)	13	(Italy) Milan
9	FW	Filippo Inzaghi	9 August 1973 (aged 28)	38	(Italy) Milan
10	FW	Francesco Totti	27 September 1976 (aged 25)	29	(Italy) Roma
11	MF	Cristiano Doni	1 April 1973 (aged 29)	3	(Italy) Atalanta
12	GK	Christian Abbiati	8 July 1977 (aged 24)	0	(Italy) Milan
13	DF	Alessandro Nesta	19 March 1976 (aged 26)	43	(Italy) Lazio
14	MF	Luigi Di Biagio	3 June 1971 (aged 30)	28	(Italy) Internazionale
15	DF	Mark Iuliano	12 August 1973 (aged 28)	16	(Italy) Juventus
16	MF	Angelo Di Livio	26 July 1966 (aged 35)	38	(Italy) Fiorentina
17	MF	Damiano Tommasi	17 May 1974 (aged 28)	14	(Italy) Roma
18	FW	Marco Delvecchio	7 April 1973 (aged 29)	16	(Italy) Roma
19	DF	Gianluca Zambrotta	19 February 1977 (aged 25)	23	(Italy) Juventus
20	FW	Vincenzo Montella	18 June 1974 (aged 27)	14	(Italy) Roma
21	FW	Christian Vieri	12 July 1973 (aged 28)	24	(Italy) Internazionale
22	GK	Francesco Toldo	2 December 1971 (aged 30)	22	(Italy) Internazionale
23	DF	Marco Materazzi	19 August 1973 (aged 28)	7	(Italy) Internazionale

== 2004 European Championship ==
- Progress: Group stage

Head coach: Giovanni Trapattoni

No.	Pos.	Player	Date of birth (age)	Caps	Club
1	GK	Gianluigi Buffon	28 January 1978 (aged 26)	41	(Italy) Juventus
2	DF	Christian Panucci	12 April 1973 (aged 31)	44	(Italy) Roma
3	DF	Massimo Oddo	14 June 1976 (aged 27)	13	(Italy) Lazio
4	MF	Cristiano Zanetti	14 April 1977 (aged 27)	20	(Italy) Internazionale
5	DF	Fabio Cannavaro (captain)	13 September 1973 (aged 30)	80	(Italy) Internazionale
6	DF	Matteo Ferrari	5 December 1979 (aged 24)	11	(Italy) Parma
7	FW	Alessandro Del Piero	9 November 1974 (aged 29)	63	(Italy) Juventus
8	MF	Gennaro Gattuso	9 January 1978 (aged 26)	29	(Italy) Milan
9	FW	Christian Vieri	12 July 1973 (aged 30)	40	(Italy) Internazionale
10	FW	Francesco Totti	27 September 1976 (aged 27)	40	(Italy) Roma
11	FW	Bernardo Corradi	30 March 1976 (aged 28)	10	(Italy) Lazio
12	GK	Francesco Toldo	2 December 1971 (aged 32)	28	(Italy) Internazionale
13	DF	Alessandro Nesta	19 March 1976 (aged 28)	62	(Italy) Milan
14	MF	Stefano Fiore	17 April 1975 (aged 29)	33	(Italy) Lazio
15	DF	Giuseppe Favalli	8 January 1972 (aged 32)	10	(Italy) Lazio
16	MF	Mauro Camoranesi	4 October 1976 (aged 27)	8	(Italy) Juventus
17	FW	Marco Di Vaio	15 July 1976 (aged 27)	12	(Italy) Fiorentina
18	FW	Antonio Cassano	12 July 1982 (aged 21)	3	(Italy) Roma
19	DF	Gianluca Zambrotta	19 February 1977 (aged 27)	41	(Italy) Juventus
20	MF	Simone Perrotta	17 September 1977 (aged 26)	17	(Italy) Chievo
21	MF	Andrea Pirlo	19 May 1979 (aged 25)	18	(Italy) Milan
22	GK	Angelo Peruzzi	16 February 1970 (aged 34)	26	(Italy) Lazio
23	DF	Marco Materazzi	19 August 1973 (aged 30)	14	(Italy) Internazionale

== 2006 World Cup ==
In honour of Italy winning the FIFA World Cup for a fourth time, all members of the World Cup-winning squad were awarded the Italian Order of Merit of Cavaliere Ufficiale.

- Progress: Winners

Head coach: Marcello Lippi

No.	Pos.	Player	Date of birth (age)	Caps	Club
1	GK	Gianluigi Buffon	28 January 1978 (aged 28)	60	(Italy) Juventus
2	DF	Cristian Zaccardo	21 December 1981 (aged 24)	12	(Italy) Palermo
3	DF	Fabio Grosso	28 November 1977 (aged 28)	17	(Italy) Palermo
4	MF	Daniele De Rossi	24 July 1983 (aged 22)	17	(Italy) Roma
5	DF	Fabio Cannavaro (captain)	13 September 1973 (aged 32)	93	(Italy) Juventus
6	DF	Andrea Barzagli	8 May 1981 (aged 25)	8	(Italy) Palermo
7	FW	Alessandro Del Piero	9 November 1974 (aged 31)	74	(Italy) Juventus
8	MF	Gennaro Gattuso	9 January 1978 (aged 28)	43	(Italy) Milan
9	FW	Luca Toni	26 May 1977 (aged 29)	18	(Italy) Fiorentina
10	FW	Francesco Totti	27 September 1976 (aged 29)	51	(Italy) Roma
11	FW	Alberto Gilardino	5 July 1982 (aged 23)	15	(Italy) Milan
12	GK	Angelo Peruzzi	16 February 1970 (aged 36)	31	(Italy) Lazio
13	DF	Alessandro Nesta	19 March 1976 (aged 30)	74	(Italy) Milan
14	GK	Marco Amelia	2 April 1982 (aged 24)	1	(Italy) Livorno
15	FW	Vincenzo Iaquinta	21 November 1979 (aged 26)	12	(Italy) Udinese
16	MF	Mauro Camoranesi	4 October 1976 (aged 29)	21	(Italy) Juventus
17	MF	Simone Barone	30 April 1978 (aged 28)	13	(Italy) Palermo
18	FW	Filippo Inzaghi	9 August 1973 (aged 32)	49	(Italy) Milan
19	DF	Gianluca Zambrotta	19 February 1977 (aged 29)	52	(Italy) Juventus
20	MF	Simone Perrotta	17 September 1977 (aged 28)	24	(Italy) Roma
21	MF	Andrea Pirlo	19 May 1979 (aged 27)	24	(Italy) Milan
22	DF	Massimo Oddo	14 June 1976 (aged 29)	20	(Italy) Lazio
23	DF	Marco Materazzi	19 August 1973 (aged 32)	28	(Italy) Internazionale

== 2008 European Championship ==
Fabio Cannavaro was ruled out of the Italian squad on 2 June after he was injured in training; he was replaced by Alessandro Gamberini.

- Progress: Quarter-finals

Head coach: Roberto Donadoni

No.	Pos.	Player	Date of birth (age)	Caps	Goals	Club
1	GK	Gianluigi Buffon	28 January 1978 (30)	82	0	(Italian Football Federation) Juventus
2	DF	Christian Panucci	12 April 1973 (35)	53	3	(Italian Football Federation) Roma
3	DF	Fabio Grosso	28 November 1977 (30)	31	3	(French Football Federation) Lyon
4	DF	Giorgio Chiellini	14 August 1984 (23)	10	1	(Italian Football Federation) Juventus
5	DF	Alessandro Gamberini	27 August 1981 (26)	2	0	(Italian Football Federation) Fiorentina
6	DF	Andrea Barzagli	8 May 1981 (27)	22	0	(Italian Football Federation) Palermo
7	FW	Alessandro Del Piero (captain)	9 November 1974 (33)	86	27	(Italian Football Federation) Juventus
8	MF	Gennaro Gattuso	9 January 1978 (30)	58	1	(Italian Football Federation) Milan
9	FW	Luca Toni	26 May 1977 (31)	34	15	(German Football Association) Bayern Munich
10	MF	Daniele De Rossi	24 July 1983 (24)	33	4	(Italian Football Federation) Roma
11	FW	Antonio Di Natale	13 October 1977 (30)	18	7	(Italian Football Federation) Udinese
12	FW	Marco Borriello	18 June 1982 (25)	3	0	(Italian Football Federation) Milan
13	MF	Massimo Ambrosini	29 May 1977 (31)	31	0	(Italian Football Federation) Milan
14	GK	Marco Amelia	2 April 1982 (26)	6	0	(Italian Football Federation) Livorno
15	FW	Fabio Quagliarella	31 January 1983 (25)	8	3	(Italian Football Federation) Udinese
16	MF	Mauro Camoranesi	4 October 1976 (31)	35	4	(Italian Football Federation) Juventus
17	GK	Morgan De Sanctis	26 March 1977 (31)	2	0	(Royal Spanish Football Federation) Sevilla
18	FW	Antonio Cassano	12 July 1982 (25)	11	3	(Italian Football Federation) Sampdoria
19	DF	Gianluca Zambrotta	19 February 1977 (31)	71	2	(Royal Spanish Football Federation) Barcelona
20	MF	Simone Perrotta	17 September 1977 (30)	41	2	(Italian Football Federation) Roma
21	MF	Andrea Pirlo	19 May 1979 (29)	46	6	(Italian Football Federation) Milan
22	MF	Alberto Aquilani	7 July 1984 (23)	5	0	(Italian Football Federation) Roma
23	DF	Marco Materazzi	19 August 1973 (34)	40	2	(Italian Football Federation) Internazionale

== 2010 World Cup ==
- Progress: Group stage

Head coach: Marcello Lippi

No.	Pos.	Player	Date of birth (age)	Caps	Club
1	GK	Gianluigi Buffon	28 January 1978 (aged 32)	101	(Italy) Juventus
2	DF	Christian Maggio	11 February 1982 (aged 28)	5	(Italy) Napoli
3	DF	Domenico Criscito	30 December 1986 (aged 23)	7	(Italy) Genoa
4	DF	Giorgio Chiellini	14 August 1984 (aged 25)	29	(Italy) Juventus
5	DF	Fabio Cannavaro (captain)	13 September 1973 (aged 36)	133	(Italy) Juventus
6	MF	Daniele De Rossi	24 July 1983 (aged 26)	54	(Italy) Roma
7	MF	Simone Pepe	30 August 1983 (aged 26)	15	(Italy) Udinese
8	MF	Gennaro Gattuso	9 January 1978 (aged 32)	72	(Italy) Milan
9	FW	Vincenzo Iaquinta	21 November 1979 (aged 30)	37	(Italy) Juventus
10	FW	Antonio Di Natale	13 October 1977 (aged 32)	33	(Italy) Udinese
11	FW	Alberto Gilardino	5 July 1982 (aged 27)	41	(Italy) Fiorentina
12	GK	Federico Marchetti	7 February 1983 (aged 27)	5	(Italy) Cagliari
13	DF	Salvatore Bocchetti	30 November 1986 (aged 23)	5	(Italy) Genoa
14	GK	Morgan De Sanctis	26 March 1977 (aged 33)	3	(Italy) Napoli
15	MF	Claudio Marchisio	19 January 1986 (aged 24)	4	(Italy) Juventus
16	MF	Mauro Camoranesi	4 October 1976 (aged 33)	53	(Italy) Juventus
17	MF	Angelo Palombo	25 September 1981 (aged 28)	17	(Italy) Sampdoria
18	FW	Fabio Quagliarella	31 January 1983 (aged 27)	20	(Italy) Napoli
19	DF	Gianluca Zambrotta	19 February 1977 (aged 33)	94	(Italy) Milan
20	FW	Giampaolo Pazzini	2 August 1984 (aged 25)	8	(Italy) Sampdoria
21	MF	Andrea Pirlo	19 May 1979 (aged 31)	66	(Italy) Milan
22	MF	Riccardo Montolivo	18 January 1985 (aged 25)	13	(Italy) Fiorentina
23	DF	Leonardo Bonucci	1 May 1987 (aged 23)	2	(Italy) Bari

== 2012 European Championship ==
Cesare Prandelli named a provisional 32-man squad on 13 May 2012, the final day of the 2011–12 Serie A season. On 29 May 2012, Prandelli announced his final squad list, with defender Domenico Criscito not considered due to match-fixing charges.

- Progress: Runners-up

Head coach: Cesare Prandelli

No.	Pos.	Player	Date of birth (age)	Caps	Goals	Club
1	GK	Gianluigi Buffon (captain)	28 January 1978 (aged 34)	120	0	(Italian Football Federation) Juventus
2	DF	Christian Maggio	11 February 1982 (aged 30)	19	0	(Italian Football Federation) Napoli
3	DF	Giorgio Chiellini	14 August 1984 (aged 27)	55	2	(Italian Football Federation) Juventus
4	DF	Angelo Ogbonna	23 May 1988 (aged 24)	3	0	(Italian Football Federation) Torino
5	MF	Thiago Motta	28 August 1982 (aged 29)	13	1	(French Football Federation) Paris Saint-Germain
6	DF	Federico Balzaretti	6 December 1981 (aged 30)	12	0	(Italian Football Federation) Palermo
7	DF	Ignazio Abate	12 November 1986 (aged 25)	5	0	(Italian Football Federation) Milan
8	MF	Claudio Marchisio	19 January 1986 (aged 26)	26	1	(Italian Football Federation) Juventus
9	FW	Mario Balotelli	12 August 1990 (aged 21)	14	4	(The Football Association) Manchester City
10	FW	Antonio Cassano	12 July 1982 (aged 29)	35	10	(Italian Football Federation) Milan
11	FW	Antonio Di Natale	13 October 1977 (aged 34)	42	11	(Italian Football Federation) Udinese
12	GK	Salvatore Sirigu	12 January 1987 (aged 25)	2	0	(French Football Federation) Paris Saint-Germain
13	MF	Emanuele Giaccherini	5 May 1985 (aged 27)	2	0	(Italian Football Federation) Juventus
14	GK	Morgan De Sanctis	26 March 1977 (aged 35)	5	0	(Italian Football Federation) Napoli
15	DF	Andrea Barzagli	8 May 1981 (aged 31)	33	0	(Italian Football Federation) Juventus
16	MF	Daniele De Rossi	24 July 1983 (aged 28)	78	10	(Italian Football Federation) Roma
17	FW	Fabio Borini	29 March 1991 (aged 21)	1	0	(Italian Football Federation) Roma
18	MF	Riccardo Montolivo	18 January 1985 (aged 27)	37	1	(Italian Football Federation) Fiorentina
19	DF	Leonardo Bonucci	1 May 1987 (aged 25)	20	2	(Italian Football Federation) Juventus
20	FW	Sebastian Giovinco	26 January 1987 (aged 25)	10	0	(Italian Football Federation) Parma
21	MF	Andrea Pirlo	19 May 1979 (aged 33)	89	10	(Italian Football Federation) Juventus
22	MF	Alessandro Diamanti	2 May 1983 (aged 29)	4	0	(Italian Football Federation) Bologna
23	MF	Antonio Nocerino	9 April 1985 (aged 27)	13	0	(Italian Football Federation) Milan

== 2014 World Cup ==
The final squad was announced on 1 June 2014. The squad numbers were revealed the next day.

- Progress: Group stage

Head coach: Cesare Prandelli

No.	Pos.	Player	Date of birth (age)	Caps	Club
1	GK	Gianluigi Buffon (captain)	28 January 1978 (aged 36)	140	(Italy) Juventus
2	DF	Mattia De Sciglio	20 October 1992 (aged 21)	11	(Italy) Milan
3	DF	Giorgio Chiellini	14 August 1984 (aged 29)	68	(Italy) Juventus
4	DF	Matteo Darmian	2 December 1989 (aged 24)	1	(Italy) Torino
5	MF	Thiago Motta	28 August 1982 (aged 31)	20	(France) Paris Saint-Germain
6	MF	Antonio Candreva	28 February 1987 (aged 27)	20	(Italy) Lazio
7	DF	Ignazio Abate	12 November 1986 (aged 27)	20	(Italy) Milan
8	MF	Claudio Marchisio	19 January 1986 (aged 28)	44	(Italy) Juventus
9	FW	Mario Balotelli	12 August 1990 (aged 23)	30	(Italy) Milan
10	FW	Antonio Cassano	12 July 1982 (aged 31)	37	(Italy) Parma
11	FW	Alessio Cerci	23 July 1987 (aged 26)	12	(Italy) Torino
12	GK	Salvatore Sirigu	12 January 1987 (aged 27)	8	(France) Paris Saint-Germain
13	GK	Mattia Perin	10 November 1992 (aged 21)	0	(Italy) Genoa
14	MF	Alberto Aquilani	7 July 1984 (aged 29)	35	(Italy) Fiorentina
15	DF	Andrea Barzagli	8 May 1981 (aged 33)	47	(Italy) Juventus
16	MF	Daniele De Rossi	24 July 1983 (aged 30)	95	(Italy) Roma
17	FW	Ciro Immobile	20 February 1990 (aged 24)	2	(Italy) Torino
18	MF	Marco Parolo	25 January 1985 (aged 29)	4	(Italy) Parma
19	DF	Leonardo Bonucci	1 May 1987 (aged 27)	37	(Italy) Juventus
20	DF	Gabriel Paletta	15 February 1986 (aged 28)	2	(Italy) Parma
21	MF	Andrea Pirlo	19 May 1979 (aged 35)	109	(Italy) Juventus
22	FW	Lorenzo Insigne	4 June 1991 (aged 23)	5	(Italy) Napoli
23	MF	Marco Verratti	5 November 1992 (aged 21)	6	(France) Paris Saint-Germain

== 2016 European Championship ==
Antonio Conte announced his final squad on 31 May 2016, with Andrea Pirlo and Sebastian Giovinco controversially left out and Claudio Marchisio and Marco Verratti left out due to injury.

- Progress: Quarter-finals

Head coach: Antonio Conte

No.	Pos.	Player	Date of birth (age)	Caps	Goals	Club
1	GK	Gianluigi Buffon (captain)	28 January 1978 (aged 38)	157	0	(Italian Football Federation) Juventus
2	DF	Mattia De Sciglio	20 October 1992 (aged 23)	22	0	(Italian Football Federation) Milan
3	DF	Giorgio Chiellini	14 August 1984 (aged 31)	83	6	(Italian Football Federation) Juventus
4	DF	Matteo Darmian	2 December 1989 (aged 26)	22	1	(The Football Association) Manchester United
5	DF	Angelo Ogbonna	23 May 1988 (aged 28)	10	0	(The Football Association) West Ham United
6	MF	Antonio Candreva	28 February 1987 (aged 29)	37	3	(Italian Football Federation) Lazio
7	FW	Simone Zaza	25 June 1991 (aged 24)	10	1	(Italian Football Federation) Juventus
8	MF	Alessandro Florenzi	11 March 1991 (aged 25)	16	2	(Italian Football Federation) Roma
9	FW	Graziano Pellè	15 July 1985 (aged 30)	12	5	(The Football Association) Southampton
10	MF	Thiago Motta	28 August 1982 (aged 33)	25	1	(French Football Federation) Paris Saint-Germain
11	FW	Ciro Immobile	20 February 1990 (aged 26)	12	1	(Italian Football Federation) Torino
12	GK	Salvatore Sirigu	12 January 1987 (aged 29)	15	0	(French Football Federation) Paris Saint-Germain
13	GK	Federico Marchetti	7 February 1983 (aged 33)	11	0	(Italian Football Federation) Lazio
14	MF	Stefano Sturaro	9 March 1993 (aged 23)	0	0	(Italian Football Federation) Juventus
15	DF	Andrea Barzagli	8 May 1981 (aged 35)	55	0	(Italian Football Federation) Juventus
16	MF	Daniele De Rossi	24 July 1983 (aged 32)	102	17	(Italian Football Federation) Roma
17	FW	Éder	15 November 1986 (aged 29)	10	2	(Italian Football Federation) Internazionale
18	MF	Marco Parolo	25 January 1985 (aged 31)	19	0	(Italian Football Federation) Lazio
19	DF	Leonardo Bonucci	1 May 1987 (aged 29)	56	3	(Italian Football Federation) Juventus
20	FW	Lorenzo Insigne	4 June 1991 (aged 25)	9	2	(Italian Football Federation) Napoli
21	MF	Federico Bernardeschi	16 February 1994 (aged 22)	3	0	(Italian Football Federation) Fiorentina
22	MF	Stephan El Shaarawy	27 October 1992 (aged 23)	18	3	(Italian Football Federation) Roma
23	MF	Emanuele Giaccherini	5 May 1985 (aged 31)	24	3	(Italian Football Federation) Bologna

== 2020 European Championship ==
Due to the COVID-19 pandemic, the tournament was played in 2021. Roberto Mancini announced his final squad on 1 June 2021. On 3 June, the injured Stefano Sensi was replaced by Matteo Pessina. On 10 June, the injured Lorenzo Pellegrini was replaced by Gaetano Castrovilli.

- Progress: Winners

Head coach: Roberto Mancini

No.	Pos.	Player	Date of birth (age)	Caps	Goals	Club
1	GK	Salvatore Sirigu	12 January 1987 (aged 34)	26	0	(Italian Football Federation) Torino
2	DF	Giovanni Di Lorenzo	4 August 1993 (aged 27)	7	0	(Italian Football Federation) Napoli
3	DF	Giorgio Chiellini (captain)	14 August 1984 (aged 36)	107	8	(Italian Football Federation) Juventus
4	DF	Leonardo Spinazzola	25 March 1993 (aged 28)	14	0	(Italian Football Federation) Roma
5	MF	Manuel Locatelli	8 January 1998 (aged 23)	10	1	(Italian Football Federation) Sassuolo
6	MF	Marco Verratti	5 November 1992 (aged 28)	40	3	(French Football Federation) Paris Saint-Germain
7	MF	Gaetano Castrovilli	17 February 1997 (aged 24)	2	0	(Italian Football Federation) Fiorentina
8	MF	Jorginho	20 December 1991 (aged 29)	28	5	(The Football Association) Chelsea
9	FW	Andrea Belotti	20 December 1993 (aged 27)	33	12	(Italian Football Federation) Torino
10	FW	Lorenzo Insigne	4 June 1991 (aged 30)	41	8	(Italian Football Federation) Napoli
11	FW	Domenico Berardi	1 August 1994 (aged 26)	11	5	(Italian Football Federation) Sassuolo
12	MF	Matteo Pessina	21 April 1997 (aged 24)	5	2	(Italian Football Federation) Atalanta
13	DF	Emerson Palmieri	3 August 1994 (aged 26)	15	0	(The Football Association) Chelsea
14	FW	Federico Chiesa	25 October 1997 (aged 23)	25	1	(Italian Football Federation) Juventus
15	DF	Francesco Acerbi	10 February 1988 (aged 33)	14	1	(Italian Football Federation) Lazio
16	MF	Bryan Cristante	3 March 1995 (aged 26)	11	1	(Italian Football Federation) Roma
17	FW	Ciro Immobile	20 February 1990 (aged 31)	46	13	(Italian Football Federation) Lazio
18	MF	Nicolò Barella	7 February 1997 (aged 24)	23	5	(Italian Football Federation) Internazionale
19	DF	Leonardo Bonucci	1 May 1987 (aged 34)	102	7	(Italian Football Federation) Juventus
20	FW	Federico Bernardeschi	16 February 1994 (aged 27)	30	6	(Italian Football Federation) Juventus
21	GK	Gianluigi Donnarumma	25 February 1999 (aged 22)	26	0	(Italian Football Federation) Milan
22	FW	Giacomo Raspadori	18 February 2000 (aged 21)	1	0	(Italian Football Federation) Sassuolo
23	DF	Alessandro Bastoni	13 April 1999 (aged 22)	5	0	(Italian Football Federation) Internazionale
24	DF	Alessandro Florenzi	11 March 1991 (aged 30)	43	2	(French Football Federation) Paris Saint-Germain
25	DF	Rafael Tolói	10 October 1990 (aged 30)	3	0	(Italian Football Federation) Atalanta
26	GK	Alex Meret	22 March 1997 (aged 24)	2	0	(Italian Football Federation) Napoli

== 2024 European Championship ==
Italy announced a 30-man squad on 23 May 2024. On 30 May, Francesco Acerbi was forced to withdraw due to injury. On 2 June, Giorgio Scalvini was also forced to withdraw due to injury, and the next day Federico Gatti was called up as a replacement. On 6 June, the final 26-man squad was announced, with Ivan Provedel, Samuele Ricci and Riccardo Orsolini being cut.

- Progress: Round of 16

Head coach: Luciano Spalletti

No.	Pos.	Player	Date of birth (age)	Caps	Goals	Club
1	GK	Gianluigi Donnarumma (captain)	25 February 1999 (aged 25)	62	0	(French Football Federation) Paris Saint-Germain
2	DF	Giovanni Di Lorenzo	4 August 1993 (aged 30)	35	3	(Italian Football Federation) Napoli
3	DF	Federico Dimarco	10 November 1997 (aged 26)	19	2	(Italian Football Federation) Internazionale
4	DF	Alessandro Buongiorno	6 June 1999 (aged 25)	4	0	(Italian Football Federation) Torino
5	DF	Riccardo Calafiori	19 May 2002 (aged 22)	2	0	(Italian Football Federation) Bologna
6	DF	Federico Gatti	24 June 1998 (aged 25)	3	0	(Italian Football Federation) Juventus
7	MF	Davide Frattesi	22 September 1999 (aged 24)	15	5	(Italian Football Federation) Internazionale
8	MF	Jorginho	20 December 1991 (aged 32)	54	5	(The Football Association) Arsenal
9	FW	Gianluca Scamacca	1 January 1999 (aged 25)	16	1	(Italian Football Federation) Atalanta
10	MF	Lorenzo Pellegrini	19 June 1996 (aged 27)	30	6	(Italian Football Federation) Roma
11	FW	Giacomo Raspadori	18 February 2000 (aged 24)	28	6	(Italian Football Federation) Napoli
12	GK	Guglielmo Vicario	7 October 1996 (aged 27)	2	0	(The Football Association) Tottenham Hotspur
13	DF	Matteo Darmian	2 December 1989 (aged 34)	43	2	(Italian Football Federation) Internazionale
14	FW	Federico Chiesa	25 October 1997 (aged 26)	47	7	(Italian Football Federation) Juventus
15	DF	Raoul Bellanova	17 May 2000 (aged 24)	2	0	(Italian Football Federation) Torino
16	MF	Bryan Cristante	3 March 1995 (aged 29)	40	2	(Italian Football Federation) Roma
17	DF	Gianluca Mancini	17 April 1996 (aged 28)	13	0	(Italian Football Federation) Roma
18	MF	Nicolò Barella	7 February 1997 (aged 27)	53	9	(Italian Football Federation) Internazionale
19	FW	Mateo Retegui	29 April 1999 (aged 25)	8	4	(Italian Football Federation) Genoa
20	FW	Mattia Zaccagni	16 June 1995 (aged 28)	5	0	(Italian Football Federation) Lazio
21	MF	Nicolò Fagioli	12 February 2001 (aged 23)	3	0	(Italian Football Federation) Juventus
22	FW	Stephan El Shaarawy	27 October 1992 (aged 31)	31	7	(Italian Football Federation) Roma
23	DF	Alessandro Bastoni	13 April 1999 (aged 25)	23	1	(Italian Football Federation) Internazionale
24	DF	Andrea Cambiaso	20 February 2000 (aged 24)	4	0	(Italian Football Federation) Juventus
25	MF	Michael Folorunsho	7 February 1998 (aged 26)	1	0	(Italian Football Federation) Hellas Verona
26	GK	Alex Meret	22 March 1997 (aged 27)	3	0	(Italian Football Federation) Napoli

== See also ==
- List of Italy international footballers
