= Zefiro =

Zefiro or Zeffiro may refer to:

- Zefiro (rocket stage), a solid-fuel motor for the European Space Agency Vega rocket
- Zefiro (train), a family of high-speed passenger trains designed by Bombardier Transportation
- Carlos Zéfiro (1921–1992), Brazilian pornographic comic artist
- The Zefiro, a fictional Romani tribe in Marvel Comics' Doctor Doom comic books; see Doom 2099
- Zefiro (restaurant), a restaurant in Portland, Oregon, United States
- Zeffiro, the Italian word for "zephyr," a west wind
- Zeffiro Furiassi (1923–1974), Italian footballer
- Italian ship Zeffiro, various Italian naval ships
