= Giuseppe Casari =

Italian footballer

Personal information
- Full name: Giuseppe Casari
- Date of birth: 10 April 1922
- Place of birth: Martinengo, Italy
- Date of death: 12 November 2013 (aged 91)
- Place of death: Seriate, Italy
- Height: 1.73 m (5 ft 8 in)
- Position: Goalkeeper

Senior career*
Years	Team	Apps	(Gls)
1944–1950	Atalanta	170	(0)
1950–1953	Napoli	107	(0)
1953–1956	Padova	54	(0)
Total		331	(0)

International career
1948–1951	Italy	6	(0)
1950	Italy B	1	(0)
- * Club domestic league appearances and goals

Giuseppe Casari (Italian pronunciation: [dʒuˈzɛppe kaˈzaːri]; 10 April 1922 − 12 November 2013) was an Italian footballer who played as a goalkeeper.

== Career ==
Born and raised in Martinengo, Bergamo, Casari debuted for his local club Atalanta in the 1944 regional championship and in Serie A the following year. In 1948 he was the starting goalkeeper for the national team at the London Olympics but, following a clean sheet against the United States, he conceded five goals against Denmark. He was part of the 1950 World Cup team as a reserve behind Sentimenti IV, but in the game against Paraguay Giuseppe Moro was called upon instead. After the 1950 World Cup he went to Napoli where he earned four caps for the national team, although he never secured a permanent starting position (the national team had called up 12 goalkeepers in a matter of 15 years). He ended his career after three seasons with Padova in 1956.

== Style of play ==
Casari was known in particular for his imposing physique and agility as a goalkeeper, which allowed him to excel in this role. He was also known for his leadership and correct behaviour throughout his career, which earned him the nickname "il gigante buono" (the good giant).
