= Arnaldo Sentimenti =

Italian footballer (1914–1997)

Personal information
- Date of birth: 24 May 1914
- Place of birth: Bomporto, Kingdom of Italy
- Date of death: 12 June 1997 (aged 83)
- Place of death: Naples, Italy
- Position: Goalkeeper

Senior career*
Years	Team	Apps	(Gls)
1930–1933	Crevalcore	28	(0)
1933–1934	Urbino	30	(0)
1934–1943	S.S.C. Napoli	156	(0)
1944	Carpi	12	(0)
1945–1948	S.S.C. Napoli	71	(0)
1948–1949	Palermo	3	(0)
1949–1950	Modena	0	(0)
Total		300	(0)

Managerial career
- 1948: Napoli
- 1950: Salernitana
- 1950–52: Stabia
- 1952–53: Turris
- ?: Lazio (Youth)
- 1959–60: Cirio
- 1960–62: Reggina
- 1963–64: Parma
- 1966–68: Internapoli
- 1968–69: Sora
- * Club domestic league appearances and goals

Arnaldo "Cherry" Sentimenti (Italian pronunciation: [arˈnaldo ˈtʃɛrri sentiˈmenti]; 24 May 1914 – 12 June 1997), also known as Sentimenti II, was a former Italian football player and coach from Bomporto in the Province of Modena, who played as a goalkeeper.

== Career ==
Sentimenti played club football for S.S.C. Napoli, where he spent over a decade, also serving as the team's captain.

== Style of play ==
Sentimenti was known for his ability to save penalties, and once stopped nine consecutive spot-kicks during his career.

== Personal life ==
The Sentimenti family were prominent in Italian football, several of Lucidio's relatives in the game include his brothers; Ennio, Lucidio, Vittorio and Primo, his cousins Lino and nephews Roberto and Andrea Sentimenti.

== Honours ==
Sporting positions
Preceded by Carlo Buscaglia	Napoli captain 1938–1943; 1945–1948	Succeeded by Egidio Di Costanzo
