= Vittorio Sentimenti =

Italian footballer (1918–2004)

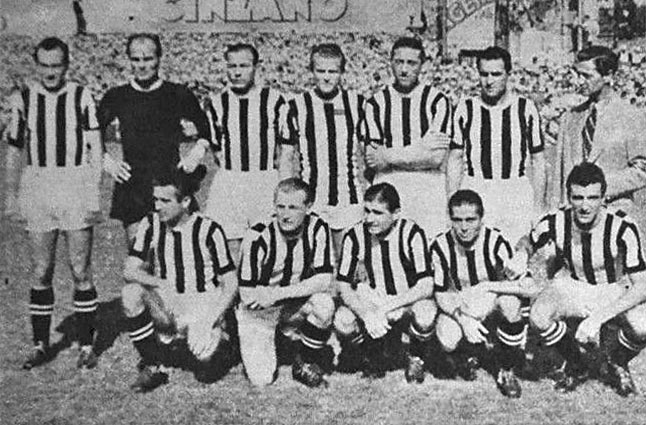
- Vittorio Sentimenti (back row, second from right) as part of Juventus in 1947

Personal information
- Date of birth: 18 August 1918
- Place of birth: Bomporto, Kingdom of Italy
- Date of death: 27 September 2004 (aged 86)
- Position: Attacking midfielder

Senior career*
Years	Team	Apps	(Gls)
1936–1941	Modena	125	(59)
1941–1949	Juventus	210	(62)
1949–1952	Lazio	75	(9)
1952–1956	Torino	88	(13)
1956–1957	Modena	11	(0)
Total		509	(143)
- * Club domestic league appearances and goals

Vittorio Sentimenti (Italian pronunciation: [vitˈtɔːrjo sentiˈmenti]; 18 August 1918 – 27 September 2004), also known as Sentimenti III, was a former Italian football player from Bomporto in the Province of Modena who played as an attacking midfielder.

== Career ==
Sentimenti played club football for several Italian teams, most prominently Juventus, Modena, Lazio, and Torino.

== Personal life ==
The Sentimenti family were prominent in Italian football, several of Lucidio's relatives in the game include his brothers; Ennio, Lucidio, Primo and Arnaldo, his cousins Lino and nephews Roberto and Andrea Sentimenti.

Vittorio played for Modena, Juventus and Lazio during the same time as his goalkeeping brother Lucidio Sentimenti, both as prominent squad members. Primo played with them both at Lazio for a while.
