= Primo Sentimenti =

Italian footballer and coach

Personal information
- Date of birth: 28 December 1926
- Place of birth: Bomporto, Italy
- Date of death: 13 October 2016 (aged 89)
- Positions: Defensive midfielder; full-back

Senior career*
Years	Team	Apps	(Gls)
1945–1949	Modena	58	(13)
1949–1950	Bari	38	(3)
1950–1957	Lazio	201	(9)
1957–1959	Udinese	39	(3)
1959–1964	Parma	113	(0)
Total		449	(28)
- * Club domestic league appearances and goals

Primo Sentimenti (Italian pronunciation: [ˈpriːmo sentiˈmenti]; 28 December 1926 – 13 October 2016), also known as Sentimenti V, was an Italian football player and coach from Bomporto in the Province of Modena who mainly played as a midfielder or as a defender, although he was a utility player who was capable of playing anywhere along the pitch.

== Career ==
Sentimenti played club football for several Italian sides, most prominently Lazio, with whom he played over 200 games.

== Personal life ==
The Sentimenti family were prominent in Italian football; several of Primo's relatives in the game included brothers Ennio, Lucidio, Vittorio and Arnaldo; cousin Lino; and nephews Roberto and Andrea Sentimenti.

Primo played with two of his brothers, Vittorio and Lucidio, at Lazio during the 1950s.
