= Carlo Buscaglia =

Italian footballer (1909-1981)

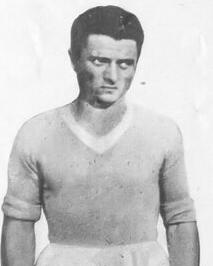

Personal information
- Date of birth: 9 February 1909
- Place of birth: Bastia di Balocco, Italy
- Date of death: 15 August 1981 (aged 72)
- Place of death: Turin, Italy
- Position: Midfielder

Senior career*
Years	Team	Apps	(Gls)
1927–28	Casale	28	(2)
1928–38	Napoli	259	(40)
1938–40	Juventus	11	(1)
1940–42	Savona	34	(10)
- * Club domestic league appearances and goals

Carlo Buscaglia (9 February 1909 – 15 August 1981) was an Italian footballer from Bastia di Balocco in the Province of Vercelli who played as a midfielder.

== Career ==
Buscaglia played club football most notably for Napoli. He spent a decade at Napoli, also serving as the team's captain, and wrote himself into the appearance records books at the club; today, he is sixth in the club's all-time appearance records for the league.

After leaving Napoli in 1938, he spent two-year spells at Juventus and Savona.

Sporting positions
Preceded by Attila Sallustro	Napoli captain 1937–1938	Succeeded by Arnaldo Sentimenti
