= Marcelino Vargas =

Paraguayan footballer (born 1921)

Personal information
- Date of birth: 1 February 1921
- Place of birth: Paraguay
- Position: Goalkeeper

Senior career*
Years	Team	Apps	(Gls)
1946-1950	Club Libertad		
1951-?	Deportivo Pereira		
?-1956	Club Libertad		

International career
1950-1955	Paraguay	11	(0)
- * Club domestic league appearances and goals

Marcelino Vargas (born 01 February 1921, date of death unknown) was a Paraguayan football goalkeeper who played for Paraguay in the 1950 FIFA World Cup and the 1955 South American Championship. He also played for Club Libertad. He is deceased.

== International career ==
Vargas got his first cap on 29 March 1950, during a friendly game against Argentina which ended in a 0-4 defeat.

He was selected in Paraguay’s squad, playing Paraguay’s whole two games against Sweden and Italy.

Vargas was also in Paraguay’s squad for the 1955 South American Championship and played four games. The game against Chile on 20 March was his eleventh and last cap with Paraguay.
