= Sentimenti =

Sentimenti is an Italian surname best known as the surname of several professional Italian football brothers from Bomporto in the Province of Modena. To differentiate them from one another, they are also known as "Sentimenti", with a Roman numeral. The members of the footballing family include:

- Ennio Sentimenti - Sentimenti I, played for Carpi amongst others as a midfielder
- Arnaldo Sentimenti - Sentimenti II, played for Napoli as a goalkeeper
- Vittorio Sentimenti - Sentimenti III, played for Juventus, Modena and Torino as an attacking midfielder
- Lucidio Sentimenti - Sentimenti IV, played for Juventus, Lazio and Italy as a goalkeeper
- Primo Sentimenti - Sentimenti V, played for Lazio as a defensive midfielder
- Lino Sentimenti - Sentimenti VI, played for Modena and others as a defender
- Andrea Sentimenti - Sentimenti VII, modern-day player who has played for Modena and most recently Castellarano as a goalkeeper

== Others ==
- Walter Sentimenti (1923–1987), Italian boxer
