= Italian ship Zeffiro =

Zeffiro has been borne by at least three ships of the Italian Navy and may refer to:

- Italian destroyer Zeffiro (1904), a Nembo-class destroyer launched in 1904 and discarded in 1924.
- Italian destroyer Zeffiro (1927), a Turbine-class destroyer launched in 1927 and sunk in 1940.
- Italian frigate Zeffiro (F 577), a Maestrale-class frigate launched in 1984.
