= Leongino Unzaim =

Paraguayan footballer (1925–1990)

Leongino Unzain
Personal information
- Full name: Leongino Unzain Taboada
- Date of birth: 16 May 1925
- Place of birth: Guarambaré, Paraguay
- Date of death: 23 March 1990 (aged 64)
- Height: 1.66 m (5 ft 5 in)
- Position: Striker

Senior career*
Years	Team	Apps	(Gls)
	Olimpia Asunción	?	(?)
	Lazio	?	(?)
1953–1956	Toulon	85	(51)
1956–1957	Bordeaux	30	(13)
1957–1958	Béziers	8	(2)
1958	Rouen	23	(8)
1958–1959	Grenoble	29	(10)

International career
1950–?	Paraguay		
- * Club domestic league appearances and goals

Leongino Unzain Taboada (16 May 1925 – 23 March 1990) was a Paraguayan football striker.

Unzain was part of the Paraguay national football team that participated in the 1950 FIFA World Cup. During his career he played for teams like Olimpia Asunción of Paraguay and S.S. Lazio of Italy.
