= Casiano Céspedes =

Paraguayan footballer (born 1924)

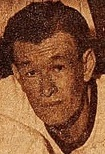

Personal information
- Full name: Casiano Céspedes Araújo
- Date of birth: 1924
- Place of birth: Paraguay
- Position: Defender

Senior career*
Years	Team	Apps	(Gls)
- Club Olimpia

International career
- Paraguay
- * Club domestic league appearances and goals

Casiano Céspedes Araújo (born 1924, date of death unknown) was a Paraguayan football defender who played for Paraguay in the 1950 FIFA World Cup. He also played for Club Olimpia. Céspedes is deceased.
