= Victoriano Leguizamón =

Paraguayan footballer and coach (1922-2007)

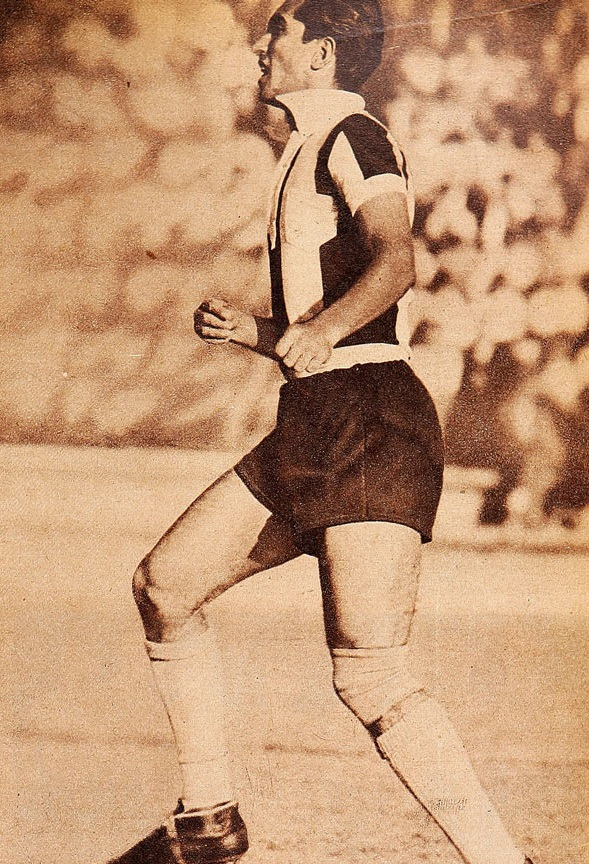

Personal information
- Full name: Victoriano Leguizamón Cristaldo
- Date of birth: 23 March 1922
- Place of birth: Concepción, Paraguay
- Date of death: 7 April 2007 (aged 85)
- Position: Midfielder

Senior career*
Years	Team	Apps	(Gls)
1940-1944	River Plate Asunción		
1945-1946	Libertad		
1947-1949	Quilmes	66	(9)
1949-1950	Boca Juniors		
1950-1956	Olimpia		

International career
1950-1956	Paraguay	19	(0)
Medal record
Representing Paraguay
Copa América
Winner	1953 Peru
- * Club domestic league appearances and goals

Victoriano Leguizamón Cristaldo (23 March 1922 – 7 April 2007) was a Paraguayan football player and coach. A midfielder, he was part of the Paraguay national team's squads for the 1950 FIFA World Cup and the 1953 South American Championship, the latter of which being won by Paraguay.

== Club career ==
Leguizamón started his career in his hometown Concepción before arriving in Asunción at the age of 18 to play for C.A. River Plate. In 1945 he signed for Libertad and in the next year he went to Argentina to play for Quilmes A.C. and then for Boca Juniors. In 1950 he came back to Paraguay to play for Olimpia Asunción until 1956.

== International career ==
Leguizamón was part of the Paraguay squad at the 1950 World Cup He played in Paraguay’s whole two games against Sweden, his first cap with Paraguay and Italy.

He also competed in the 1953 Copa América tournament which was won by Paraguay, playing all seven games as the competition was eventually won by Paraguay.

Leguizamón was also part of Paraguay's squad for the 1956 South American Championship, playing four games.

The friendly against Brazil on 12 June 1956 was his last cap with Paraguay.

He had 19 caps and no goals playing for Paraguay.

== Managerial career ==
As a coach, he managed several teams from his native city Concepción.
