= Gonzalito (footballer) =

Paraguayan footballer (1922-2003)

Personal information
- Full name: Alberto González
- Date of birth: 1921 30 Nowember
- Place of birth: Paraguay
- Date of death: 21 August 2003 (aged 80–81)
- Position: Defender

Senior career*
Years	Team	Apps	(Gls)
- Club Olimpia

International career
- Paraguay
- * Club domestic league appearances and goals

Alberto González, nicknamed Gonzalito (1922 – 21 August 2003) was a Paraguayan football defender who played for Paraguay in the 1950 FIFA World Cup. He also played for Club Olimpia.
