= Castor Cantero =

Paraguayan footballer (born 1918)

Personal information
- Full name: Sixto Castor Cantero Bordón
- Date of birth: 12 January 1918
- Place of birth: Paraguay
- Date of death: 24 February 2002 (aged 84)
- Position: Midfielder

International career
Years	Team	Apps	(Gls)
- Paraguay

Sixto Castor Cantero Bordón (12 January 1918 – 24 February 2002) was a Paraguayan football midfielder.

Cantero was part of the Paraguay national football team that participated in the 1950 FIFA World Cup and the Copa América tournaments of 1946 and 1949. He has 34 caps and no goals playing for Paraguay between 1942 and 1950. During most of his career he played for Olimpia Asunción. Cantero is deceased.
