= César López Fretes =

Paraguayan footballer (1923-2001)

Personal information
- Full name: César López Fretes
- Date of birth: 21 March 1923
- Place of birth: Paraguay
- Date of death: 13 July 2001 (aged 78)
- Position: Forward

International career
Years	Team	Apps	(Gls)
- Paraguay

César López Fretes (21 March 1923 – 13 July 2001) was a football striker from Paraguay.

López Fretes started his career at Atlántida Sport Club from Barrio Obrero and was later transferred to Olimpia Asunción. He was part of the Paraguay squad at the 1950 World Cup and was one of the goal scorers for Paraguay. He also played for Paraguay in the Copa América tournament.

After retiring, he became a coach and managed several teams in Paraguay and Colombia, where he is remembered by Atlético Nacional fans for the championship he led the team to in 1973. He also managed Deportivo Pereira and Unión Magdalena. López also coached the Colombia national football team and died in that country in 2001.
