= Augusto Magli =

Italian footballer (1923-1998)

Personal information
- Full name: Augusto Magli
- Date of birth: 9 March 1923
- Place of birth: Molinella, Italy
- Date of death: 1 November 1998 (aged 75)
- Place of death: São Paulo, Brazil
- Height: 1.78 m (5 ft 10 in)
- Position: Midfielder

Senior career*
Years	Team	Apps	(Gls)
1939–1941	Molinella	1	(0)
1941–1943	Fiorentina	3	(0)
1944	Bologna	1	(0)
1945–1954	Fiorentina	244	(3)
1954–1957	Udinese	85	(3)
1957–1958	Roma	31	(1)

International career
1950	Italy	1	(0)
1950	Italy B	1	(0)
- * Club domestic league appearances and goals

Augusto Magli (Italian pronunciation: [auˈɡusto ˈmaʎʎi]; 9 March 1923 – 1 November 1998) was an Italian footballer who played as a midfielder.

== Club career ==
Nicknamed 'Mancino', Augusto Magli made his debut in Serie A when he was 17 years old with Fiorentina and played for the Florence side until 1954, just after reaching 30 years of age. At Fiorentina he became the club's star player, although unfortunately they were a mid-table team in those years. He then left Fiorentina for Udinese which finished in second place behind A.C. Milan in Serie A during the 1954–55 season. He then retired at the age of 35 after playing for Roma.

== International career ==
Magli made his only appearance for the national team at the 1950 World Cup in the opening match against Sweden.
