= Giuseppe Moro =

Italian footballer

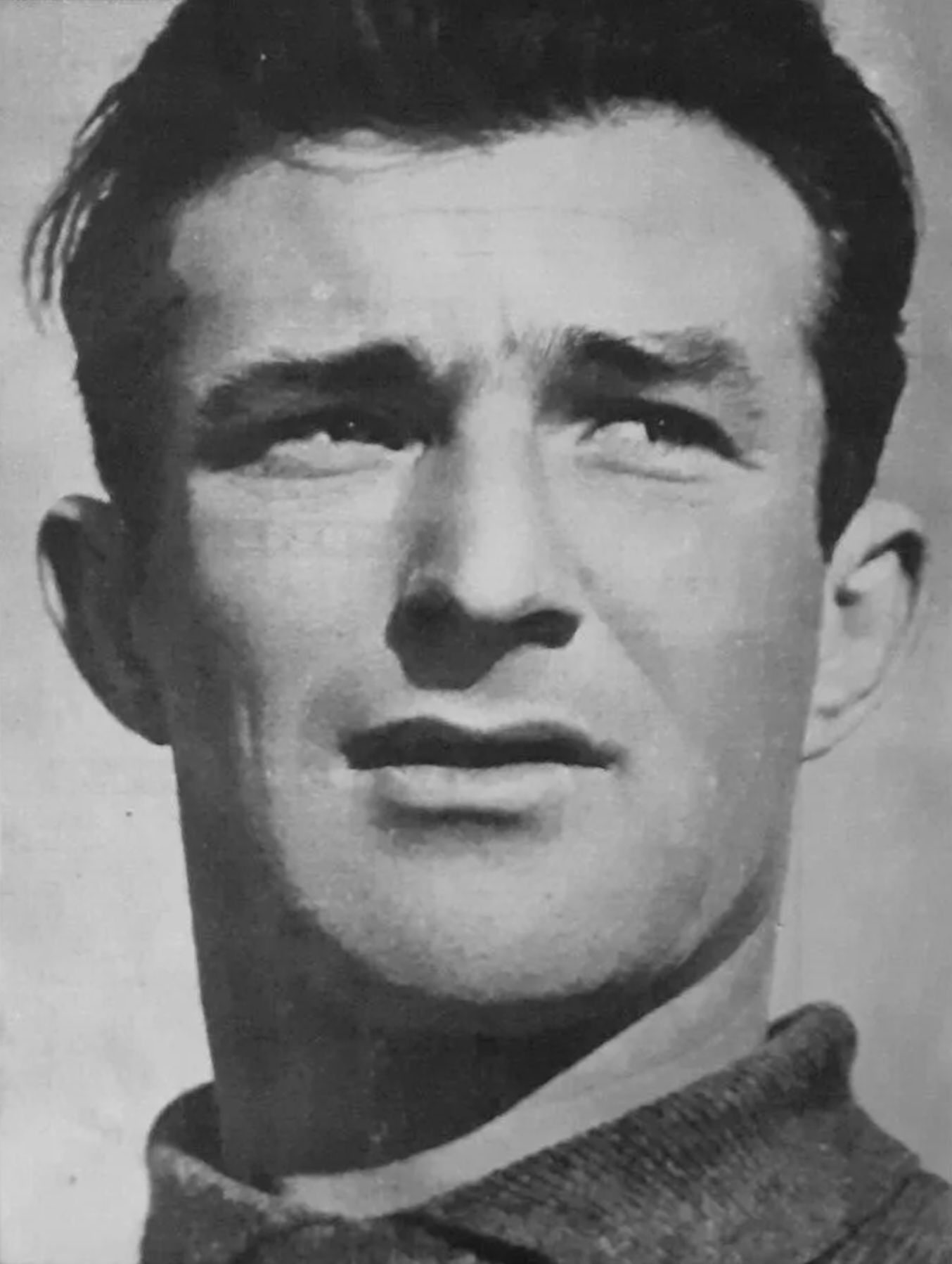
- "Bepi" Moro, c. 1952

Personal information
- Full name: Giuseppe Moro
- Date of birth: 16 January 1921
- Place of birth: Carbonera, Italy
- Date of death: 28 January 1974 (aged 53)
- Place of death: Porto Sant'Elpidio, Italy
- Position: Goalkeeper

Senior career*
Years	Team	Apps	(Gls)
1937–1942	Treviso	68	(0)
1942–1943	Alessandria	12	(0)
1944–1947	Treviso	11	(0)
1947–1948	Fiorentina	38	(0)
1948–1949	Bari	36	(0)
1949–1950	Torino	32	(0)
1950–1951	Lucchese	38	(0)
1951–1953	Sampdoria	72	(0)
1953–1955	Roma	55	(0)
1955–1956	Verona	15	(0)
Total		377	(0)

International career
1949–1953	Italy	9	(0)
- * Club domestic league appearances and goals

Giuseppe "Bepi" Moro (Italian pronunciation: [dʒuˈzɛppe ˈmɔːro]; 16 January 1921 – 28 January 1974) was an Italian footballer who played as a goalkeeper. An eccentric and athletic player, who was also an excellent shot-stopper, he is regarded as one of Italy's most spectacular keepers of all time; he was also known for his penalty–stopping abilities: with 16 saves in 270 appearances between 1947 and 1955, he has stopped the fifth–highest number of penalties in Serie A, alongside Gianluigi Buffon.

== Club career ==
In eight season in Serie A, Giuseppe Moro defended the goal of six different teams: Fiorentina, Bari, Torino, Lucchese, Sampdoria and Roma.

== International career ==
Moro made his debut with the Italy national team in 1949, producing some notable saves against Hungary. During his second appearance, in a classic England–Italy match played in London, he showcased his best-known block: Stan Mortensen tried to get past Moro with a powerful and accurate shot which the Italian goalkeeper brilliantly denied. Moro kept a clean sheet for 75 minutes, before giving up goals to Jack Rowley and Billy Wright, which did not diminish his outstanding performance.

He also appeared with Italy in the 1950 World Cup in a win against Paraguay, replacing the first-choice goalkeeper Lucidio Sentimenti, who had played the two previous matches.
