= Zeffiro Furiassi =

Italian footballer

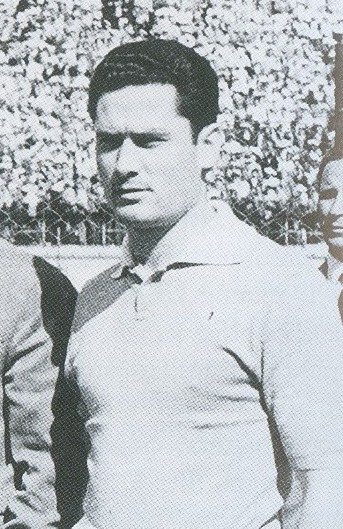

Personal information
- Full name: Zeffiro Furiassi
- Date of birth: 19 January 1923
- Place of birth: Pesaro, Kingdom of Italy
- Date of death: 4 November 1974 (aged 51)
- Height: 1.67 m (5 ft 6 in)
- Position: Defender

Senior career*
Years	Team	Apps	(Gls)
1939–1940	Pesaro	7	(0)
1940–1943	Fiorentina	30	(0)
1944	Carpi		
1945–1946	Biellese	18	(0)
1946–1949	Fiorentina	86	(0)
1949–1954	Lazio	122	(0)

International career
1950	Italy	2	(0)
1950	Italy B	1	(0)
- * Club domestic league appearances and goals

Zeffiro Furiassi (Italian pronunciation: [ˈdzɛffiro fuˈrjassi]; 19 January 1923 – 4 November 1974) was an Italian footballer who played as a defender.

== Club career ==
Furiasso was born in Pesaro. Playing for Fiorentina and Lazio, he played eight seasons as a starter and racked up 239 appearances in Serie A without ever scoring a goal.

== International career ==
Furiassi made his only two appearances in the Italy national team, at the 1950 World Cup.
