= Lucidio Sentimenti =

Italian footballer

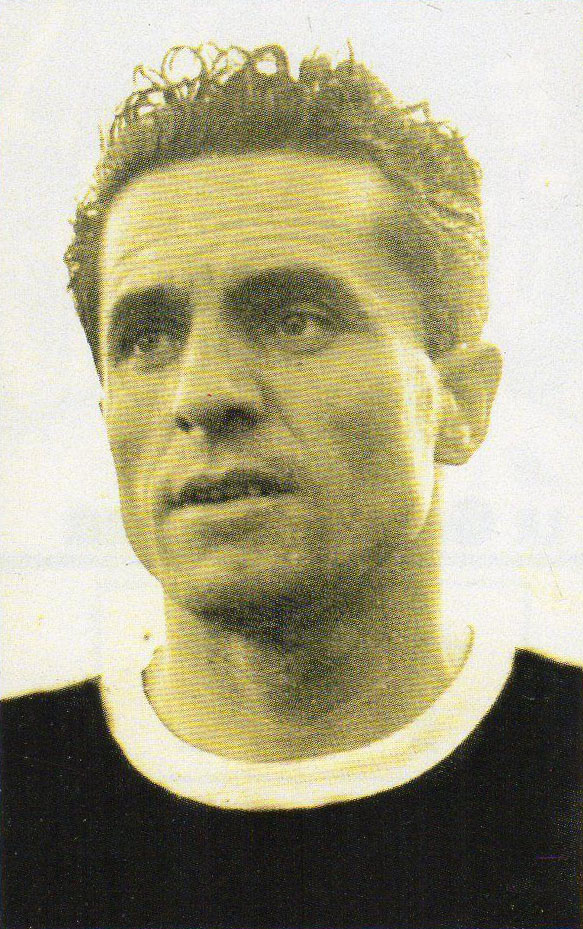
- Sentimenti IV with Juventus in the 1940s

Personal information
- Date of birth: 1 July 1920
- Place of birth: Bomporto, Emilia-Romagna, Italy
- Date of death: 28 November 2014 (aged 94)
- Place of death: Turin, Piedmont, Italy
- Height: 1.70 m (5 ft 7 in)
- Position: Goalkeeper

Senior career*
Years	Team	Apps	(Gls)
1940–1942	Modena	49	(1)
1942–1949	Juventus	186	(1)
1949–1954	Lazio	170	(3)
1954–1957	Vicenza	82	(0)
1957–1960	Cenisia	74	(0)
1959	A.C. Torino	3	(0)
Total		564	(7)

International career
1945–1953	Italy	9	(0)
- * Club domestic league appearances and goals

Lucidio Sentimenti (Italian pronunciation: [luˈtʃiːdjo sentiˈmenti]; 1 July 1920 – 28 November 2014), also known as Sentimenti IV, was an Italian footballer from Bomporto in the Province of Modena, who played as a goalkeeper. His nickname, Sentimenti IV, comes from the fact that he is the fourth of five brothers – Ennio (I), Arnaldo (II), Vittorio (III) and Primo (V) - all of whom, but the eldest were also professional footballers. Only Lucidio played for the Italy national side.

== Club career ==
After starting his career with Modena, Sentimenti played football for several other Italian clubs, including Juventus and Lazio.

== International career ==
Sentimenti also played for the Italy national football team nine different times between 1945 and 1964 and was a member of the team that took part at the 1950 FIFA World Cup.

== Style of play ==
A former out-field player, who was capable of playing in any position, including as a striker, due to his excellent shot, Sentimenti was known for being an accurate penalty-kick taker, and very adept with the ball at his feet, possessing a long goal kick and accurate distribution, and was known to be one of the first goalscoring goalkeepers. Nicknamed "Cochi", he was a reliable, tenacious and composed goalkeeper, who was known for his intelligence and speed when rushing off his line to anticipate his opponents with his feet, as well as his ability to come out and collect crosses or punch the ball clear, despite his small stature, due to his athleticism, command of his area, and strong physique. An excellent shot-stopper between the posts, he was also known for his agility, handling, consistency, composure, and positional sense, although at times he was caught out from distance throughout his career.

== Personal life ==
The Sentimenti family were prominent in Italian football, several of Lucidio's relatives in the game include his brothers; Ennio, Arnaldo, Vittorio and Primo, his cousins Lino and nephews Roberto and Andrea Sentimenti.

Lucidio played for Modena, Juventus and Lazio during the same time as his attacking midfielder brother Vittorio Sentimenti, both as prominent squad members. Primo played with them both at Lazio for a while.

== Death ==
Sentimenti died in Turin, Italy, aged 94.

== Honours ==
Vicenza

- Serie B: 1954–55
