= 2007–08 AC Milan season =

Milan
2007–08 season
- Chairman: Silvio Berlusconi
- Head coach: Carlo Ancelotti
- Stadium: San Siro
- Serie A: 5th
- Coppa Italia: Round of 16
- UEFA Champions League: Round of 16
- UEFA Super Cup: Winners
- FIFA Club World Cup: Winners
- Top goalscorer: League: Kaká (15); All: Kaká (19)
- Average home league attendance: 56,642
Home colours	Away colours	Third colours

During the 2007–08 season, Associazione Calcio Milan played its 74th Serie A season in the club's existence. Milan competed in Serie A, finishing fifth and failing to qualify for the following seasons UEFA Champions League for the first time since 2001–02, as well as in the Coppa Italia and the UEFA Champions League, being knocked out in the round of 16 in both competitions. As winners of the 2006–07 UEFA Champions League Milan competed in the UEFA Super Cup and the FIFA Club World Cup, winning both competitions.

== Club ==
=== Management ===
Position	Staff
Head coach	(Italy) Carlo Ancelotti
Assistant coach	(Italy) Mauro Tassotti
Goalkeeping coaches	(Italy) Villiam Vecchi (Italy) Beniamino Abate
Fitness coaches	(Italy) Daniele Tognaccini (Italy) Giovanni Mauri
Club doctor	(Italy) Massimiliano Sala

Last updated: 24 April 2008
Source: A.C. Milan

=== Other information ===
President	(Italy) Silvio Berlusconi
Ground (capacity and dimensions)	San Siro (82, 955 / 105m x 68m)

Source: San Siro article: 24 April 2008

== Players ==
=== Squad information ===

Starting line-up. Before Alexandre Pato joined A.C. Milan, Filippo Inzaghi used to be the striker usually playing along with Alberto Gilardino in the occasions Carlo Ancelotti chose to play 4–3–1–2. In a more defensive and quite frequently used tactical disposition there used to be a single forward (Inzaghi, Gilardino or, after his arrival at the club, Pato) and five midfielders.

As of 1 March 2008. Note: Flags indicate national team as defined under FIFA eligibility rules; some limited exceptions apply. Players may hold more than one non-FIFA nationality.

No.	Pos.	Nation	Player
1	GK	BRA	Dida
2	DF	BRA	Cafu
3	DF	ITA	Paolo Maldini (captain)
4	DF	GEO	Kakha Kaladze
5	MF	BRA	Emerson
7	FW	BRA	Alexandre Pato
8	MF	ITA	Gennaro Gattuso (vice-captain)
9	FW	ITA	Filippo Inzaghi
10	MF	NED	Clarence Seedorf
11	FW	ITA	Alberto Gilardino
13	DF	ITA	Alessandro Nesta
16	GK	AUS	Zeljko Kalac
17	DF	CRO	Dario Šimić
18	DF	CZE	Marek Jankulovski
19	DF	ITA	Giuseppe Favalli

No.	Pos.	Nation	Player
20	MF	FRA	Yoann Gourcuff
21	MF	ITA	Andrea Pirlo
22	MF	BRA	Kaká
23	MF	ITA	Massimo Ambrosini (vice-captain)
25	DF	ITA	Daniele Bonera
27	MF	BRA	Serginho
29	GK	ITA	Valerio Fiori
31	DF	BRA	Digão
32	MF	ITA	Cristian Brocchi
34	MF	FRA	Ibrahim Ba
36	DF	ITA	Matteo Darmian
43	FW	ITA	Alberto Paloschi
44	DF	ITA	Massimo Oddo
94	FW	FRA	Willy Aubameyang
99	FW	BRA	Ronaldo

=== Transfers ===
In
Pos.	Name	from	Type
MF	Emerson	Real Madrid	(€5 million )
GK	Christian Abbiati	Torino F.C.	loan ended
GK	Ferdinando Coppola	Piacenza Calcio	loan ended
DF	Ignazio Abate	Modena F.C.	loan ended
DF	Davide Astori	Pizzighettone	loan ended
DF	Luca Antonini	A.C. Siena	loan ended
DF	Lino Marzorati	Empoli F.C.	loan ended
DF	Romano Perticone	Hellas Verona	loan ended
MF	Ibrahim Ba		free
MF	Digão	Rimini	loan ended
MF	Massimo Donati	Atalanta B.C.	loan ended
MF	Paolo Sammarco	Chievo Verona	co-ownership
FW	Matteo Ardemagni	Pizzighettone	loan ended
FW	Alessandro Matri	Rimini	loan ended

Out
Pos.	Name	To	Type
DF	Alessandro Costacurta		retired
MF	Massimo Donati	Celtic	
MF	Gastone Bottini	Lecce	
DF	Ignazio Abate	Empoli F.C.	co-ownership
DF	Luca Antonini	Empoli F.C.	co-ownership
DF	Lino Marzorati	Empoli F.C.	co-ownership
MF	Paolo Sammarco	Sampdoria	co-ownership
FW	Marco Borriello	Genoa C.F.C.	co-ownership
FW	Alessandro Matri	Cagliari Calcio	co-ownership
GK	Christian Abbiati	Atletico Madrid	loan
GK	Ferdinando Coppola	Atalanta B.C.	loan
GK	Marco Storari	Levante	loan
DF	Luca Antonelli	A.S. Bari	loan
DF	Davide Astori	Cremonese	loan
DF	Marcus Diniz	A.C. Monza	loan
DF	Leandro Grimi	A.C. Siena	loan
DF	Romano Perticone	Cremonese	loan
MF	Davide Di Gennaro	Bologna F.C.	loan
FW	Matteo Ardemagni	Pro Patria	loan
FW	Ricardo Oliveira	Real Zaragoza	loan

==== Winter ====
In
Pos.	Name	from	Type
GK	Marco Storari	Levante	loan ended
DF	Luca Antonelli	A.S. Bari	loan ended
DF	Leandro Grimi	A.C. Siena	loan ended
FW	Alexandre Pato	SC Internacional	(€22 million )

Out
Pos.	Name	To	Type
GK	Marco Storari	Cagliari Calcio	loan
DF	Luca Antonelli	Parma F.C.	loan
DF	Leandro Grimi	Sporting Lisboa	loan

== Pre-season and friendlies ==
Win Draw Loss

29 July 2007 Friendly	Lecco	0–4	Milan	Lecco, Italy
			Ronaldo 40'; Kaká 56'; Brocchi 71'; Seedorf 87'	Stadium: Stadio Rigamonti-Ceppi; Referee: Emiliano Gallione (Italy)

3 August 2007 Russian Railways Cup	Milan	0–0 (3–4 p)	PSV Eindhoven	Moscow, Russia
18:30 MSK				Stadium: Lokomotiv Stadium; Attendance: 20,000; Referee: Valentin Ivanov (Russia)
	Penalties
	Kaká (penalty scored); Serginho (penalty scored); Pirlo (penalty scored); Gourcuff (penalty missed); Seedorf (penalty missed)		(penalty missed) Simons; (penalty scored) de Jong; (penalty scored) Addo; (penalty scored) Zonneveld; (penalty scored) Salcido

5 August 2007 Russian Railways Cup	Lokomotiv Moscow	3–3 (4–5 p)	Milan	Moscow, Russia
18:00 MSK	Šimić 17' (o.g.); Ivanović 28'; Odemwingie 43'		Kaká 20'; Seedorf 87'; Brocchi 90+2'	Stadium: Lokomotiv Stadium; Attendance: 25,000; Referee: Ľuboš Micheľ (Slovakia)
	Penalties
	Maminov (penalty scored); Korchagin (penalty scored); Bilyaletdinov (penalty scored); Kontsedalov (penalty missed); Asatiani (penalty scored)		(penalty scored) Oddo; (penalty scored) Jankulovski; (penalty scored) Pirlo; (penalty scored) Nesta; (penalty scored) Brocchi

9 August 2007 Friendly	Real Betis	1–0	Milan	Seville, Spain
	González 47'			Stadium: Estadio Manuel Ruiz de Lopera; Referee: Pérez Lasa (Spain)

14 August 2007 TIM Trophy	Milan	1–0	Juventus	Milan, Italy
22:00 CEST	Gilardino 26'	Report		Stadium: San Siro; Attendance: 25,280; Referee: Andrea Gervasoni (Italy)
Note: 45-minute match

14 August 2007 TIM Trophy	Internazionale	1–0	Milan	Milan, Italy
23:00 CEST	Recoba 28'	Report		Stadium: San Siro; Attendance: 25,280; Referee: Antonio Damato (Italy)
Note: 45-minute match

17 August 2007 Trofeo Luigi Berlusconi	Milan	2–0	Juventus	Milan, Italy
	Inzaghi 43', 47'			Stadium: San Siro; Attendance: 25,000; Referee: Luca Banti (Italy)

6 September 2007 Friendly	Dynamo Kyiv	2–2	Milan	Kyiv, Ukraine
	Milevskyi 6'; Gavrančić 21'		Pato 45'; Gilardino 50'	Stadium: Olympic Stadium; Referee: Serhiy Shebek (Ukraine)

12 October 2007 Friendly	Athletic Bilbao	0–0	Milan	Bilbao, Spain
				Stadium: San Mamés Stadium; Referee: Jose Antonio Delgado Garcia (Spain)

8 January 2008 Friendly	United Arab Emirates	0–2	Milan	Bilbao, Spain
			Gilardino 78', 85'	Stadium: San Mamés Stadium; Referee: Farid Ali (United Arab Emirates)

== Competitions ==
Win Draw Loss

=== Overall ===
Competition	Started round	Final position	Final Round	First match	Last match
Serie A	Round 1	5th	Round 38	26 August 2007	18 May 2008
Coppa Italia	Round of 16	Eliminated	Round of 16	20 December 2007	16 January 2008
UEFA Champions League	Group stage	Eliminated	Round of 16	19 September 2007	4 March 2008
UEFA Super Cup	—	Winners	—	31 August 2007	
FIFA Club World Cup	Semi-finals	Winners	Finals	13 December 2007	16 December 2007

=== Serie A ===
==== League table ====
Pos	Team	Pld	W	D	L	GF	GA	GD	Pts	Qualification or relegation
3	Juventus	38	20	12	6	72	37	+35	72	Qualification to Champions League third qualifying round
4	Fiorentina	38	19	9	10	55	39	+16	66	Qualification to Champions League third qualifying round
5	Milan	38	18	10	10	66	38	+28	64	Qualification to UEFA Cup first round (Note: The 7th-placed team qualified for the UEFA Cup due to both of the Coppa Italia finalists, Roma and Internazionale, finishing 6th or higher.)
6	Sampdoria	38	17	9	12	56	46	+10	60	Qualification to UEFA Cup first round
7	Udinese	38	16	9	13	48	53	−5	57	Qualification to UEFA Cup first round

Source: Serie A
Rules for classification: 1) points; 2) head-to-head points; 3) head-to-head goal difference; 4) head-to-head goals scored; 5) goal difference; 6) number of goals scored.

==== Results summary ====
Overall								Home						Away					
Pld	W	D	L	GF	GA	GD	Pts	W	D	L	GF	GA	GD	W	D	L	GF	GA	GD
38	18	10	10	66	38	+28	64	8	7	4	31	18	+13	10	3	6	35	20	+15

Last updated: 18 May 2008.
Source: Competitive matches

==== Results by round ====
Round	1	2	3	4	5	6	7	8	9	10	11	12	13	14	15	16	17	18	19	20	21	22	23	24	25	26	27	28	29	30	31	32	33	34	35	36	37	38	39	40	41
Ground	A	H	A	H	A	H	A	H	H	A	H	P	A	A	P	P	H	A	H	A	H	A	H	A	H	A	H	A	H	A	A	H	A	H	H	A	H	A	H	A	H
Result	W	D	D	D	L	D	W	L	L	W	D	-	W	D	-	-	L	W	W	L	W	W	W	W	D	D	W	D	D	W	L	L	W	L	W	L	W	W	W	L	W
Position	2	3	5	9	9	11	8	11	13	10	9	11	9	8	10	11	12	12	9	10	7	6	5	5	5	5	4	5	5	5	5	6	5	5	5	5	5	5	4	5	5

Source: calcio-seriea.net
A = Away; H = Home; W = Win; D = Draw; L = Loss; P = Postponed; = Leader, 2008–09 UEFA Champions League Groups stage; = 2008–09 UEFA Champions League Groups stage; = 2008–09 UEFA Champions League Qualifying round; = 2008–09 UEFA Cup; = 2008–09 Serie B

==== Matches ====
26 August 2007 1	Genoa	0–3	Milan	Genoa
15:00 CEST (UTC+02:00)		Report	Ambrosini 21'; Kaká 44', 45+3' (pen.)	Stadium: Stadio Luigi Ferraris; Attendance: 23,533; Referee: Massimiliano Saccani

3 September 2007 2	Milan	1–1	Fiorentina	Milan
18:00 CEST (UTC+02:00)	Kaká 27' (pen.)	Report	Mutu 56'	Stadium: San Siro; Attendance: 40,000; Referee: Stefano Farina
Note: Match rescheduled from 2 September 2007 due to 2007 UEFA Super Cup

15 September 2007 3	Siena	1–1	Milan	Siena
18:00 CEST (UTC+02:00)	Maccarone 24'	Report	Nesta 90+1'	Stadium: Montepaschi Arena; Attendance: 14,084; Referee: Luca Banti

22 September 2007 4	Milan	1–1	Parma	Milan
20:30 CEST (UTC+02:00)	Seedorf 44'	Report	Pisanu 73'	Stadium: San Siro; Attendance: 51,026; Referee: Antonio Damato

26 September 2007 5	Palermo	2–1	Milan	Palermo
20:30 CEST (UTC+02:00)	Diana 73'; Miccoli 90+3'	Report	Seedorf 10'	Stadium: Stadio Renzo Barbera; Attendance: 30,761; Referee: Stefano Farina

30 September 2007 6	Milan	1–1	Catania	Milan
15:00 CEST (UTC+02:00)	Kaká 48' (pen.)	Report	Martínez 26'	Stadium: San Siro; Attendance: 49,835; Referee: Andrea Gervasoni

7 October 2007 7	Lazio	1–5	Milan	Rome
20:30 CEST (UTC+02:00)	Mauri 23'	Report	Ambrosini 16'; Kaká 33' (pen.), 52'; Gilardino 70', 79'	Stadium: Stadio Olimpico; Attendance: 26,364; Referee: Emidio Morganti

21 October 2007 8	Milan	0–1	Empoli	Milan
15:00 CEST (UTC+02:00)		Report	Saudati 55'	Stadium: San Siro; Attendance: 50,991; Referee: Antonio Giannoccaro

28 October 2007 9	Milan	0–1	Roma	Milan
15:00 CET (UTC+01:00)		Report	Vučinić 72'	Stadium: San Siro; Attendance: 60,205; Referee: Roberto Rosetti

31 October 2007 10	Sampdoria	0–5	Milan	Genoa
20:30 CET (UTC+01:00)		Report	Kaká 47'; Gilardino 53', 61'; Gourcuff 76'; Seedorf 80'	Stadium: Stadio Luigi Ferraris; Attendance: 22,195; Referee: Nicola Ayroldi

3 November 2007 11	Milan	0–0	Torino	Milan
20:30 CET (UTC+01:00)		Report		Stadium: San Siro; Attendance: 54,980; Referee: Paolo Tagliavento

25 November 2007 13	Cagliari	1–2	Milan	Cagliari
15:00 CET (UTC+01:00)	Acquafresca 4'	Report	Gilardino 62'; Pirlo 86'	Stadium: Sant'Elia; Attendance: 18,400; Referee: Paolo Dondarini

1 December 2007 14	Milan	0–0	Juventus	Milan
20:30 CET (UTC+01:00)		Report		Stadium: San Siro; Attendance: 76,145; Referee: Emidio Morganti

23 December 2007 17	Internazionale	2–1	Milan	Milan
15:00 CET (UTC+01:00)	Cruz 36'; Cambiasso 63'	Report	Pirlo 18'	Stadium: Giuseppe Meazza; Attendance: 78,675; Referee: Emidio Morganti

13 January 2008 18	Milan	5–2	Napoli	Milan
20:30 CET (UTC+01:00)	Ronaldo 15', 46'; Seedorf 31'; Kaká 68'; Pato 74'	Report	Sosa 28'; Domizzi 38' (pen.)	Stadium: San Siro; Attendance: 75,085; Referee: Roberto Rosetti

20 January 2008 19	Udinese	0–1	Milan	Udine
15:00 CET (UTC+01:00)		Report	Gilardino 90+2'	Stadium: Stadio Friuli; Attendance: 24,574; Referee: Stefano Farina

23 January 2008 12	Atalanta	2–1	Milan	Bergamo
20:30 CET (UTC+01:00)	Langella 42'; Tissone 68'	Report	Gattuso 16'	Stadium: Stadio Atleti Azzurri d'Italia; Attendance: 0 Referee: Paolo Dondarini
Note: Match suspended at 7' on 11 November 2007 due to a fans riot.

27 January 2008 20	Milan	2–0	Genoa	Milan
15:00 CET (UTC+01:00)	Pato 68', 82'	Report		Stadium: San Siro; Attendance: 49,028; Referee: Gianluca Rocchi

30 January 2008 15	Reggina	0–1	Milan	Reggio Calabria
20:30 CET (UTC+01:00)		Report	Gilardino 17'	Stadium: Stadio Oreste Granillo; Attendance: 17,427; Referee: Andrea De Marco
Note: Match rescheduled from 9 December 2007 due to 2007 FIFA Club World Cup.

3 February 2008 21	Fiorentina	0–1	Milan	Florence
20:30 CET (UTC+01:00)		Report	Pato 77'	Stadium: Stadio Artemio Franchi; Attendance: 38,977; Referee: Massimiliano Saccani

10 February 2008 22	Milan	1–0	Siena	Milan
15:00 CET (UTC+01:00)	Paloschi 63'	Report		Stadium: San Siro; Attendance: 52,477; Referee: Daniele Orsato

13 February 2008 16	Milan	1–1	Livorno	Milan
20:30 CET (UTC+01:00)	Pirlo 61' (pen.)	Report	Pulzetti 50'	Stadium: San Siro; Attendance: 47,382; Referee: Christian Brighi
Note: Match rescheduled from 16 December 2007 due to 2007 FIFA Club World Cup.

16 February 2008 23	Parma	0–0	Milan	Parma
18:00 CET (UTC+01:00)		Report		Stadium: Stadio Ennio Tardini; Attendance: 20,720; Referee: Paolo Dondarini

24 February 2008 24	Milan	2–1	Palermo	Milan
20:30 CET (UTC+01:00)	Ambrosini 24'; Inzaghi 90'	Report	Bresciano 9'	Stadium: San Siro; Attendance: 49,341; Referee: Antonio Giannoccaro

27 February 2008 25	Catania	1–1	Milan	Catania
20:30 CET (UTC+01:00)	Spinesi 63'	Report	Pato 55'	Stadium: Stadio Angelo Massimino; Attendance: 21,000; Referee: Andrea De Marco

1 March 2008 26	Milan	1–1	Lazio	Milan
20:30 CET (UTC+01:00)	Oddo 66' (pen.)	Report	Bianchi 54'	Stadium: San Siro; Attendance: 52,016; Referee: Domenico Celi

9 March 2008 27	Empoli	1–3	Milan	Empoli
15:00 CET (UTC+01:00)	Buscè 24'	Report	Pato 19'; Ambrosini 86'; Kaká 89'	Stadium: Stadio Carlo Castellani; Attendance: 9,532; Referee: Stefano Farina

15 March 2008 28	Roma	2–1	Milan	Rome
20:30 CET (UTC+01:00)	Giuly 78'; Vučinić 81'	Report	Kaká 56'	Stadium: Stadio Olimpico; Attendance: 48,447; Referee: Nicola Rizzoli

19 March 2008 29	Milan	1–2	Sampdoria	Milan
20:30 CET (UTC+01:00)	Paloschi 71'	Report	Maggio 12'; Delvecchio 25'	Stadium: San Siro; Attendance: 52,477; Referee: Luca Banti

22 March 2008 30	Torino	0–1	Milan	Turin
15:00 CET (UTC+01:00)		Report	Pato 66'	Stadium: Stadio Olimpico; Attendance: 21,009; Referee: Massimiliano Saccani

30 March 2008 31	Milan	1–2	Atalanta	Milan
15:00 CEST (UTC+02:00)	Maldini 85'	Report	Floccari 32'; Langella 42'	Stadium: San Siro; Attendance: 50,990; Referee: Christian Brighi

5 April 2008 32	Milan	3–1	Cagliari	Milan
20:30 CEST (UTC+02:00)	Kaká 8'; Inzaghi 31', 69'	Report	Conti 49'	Stadium: San Siro; Attendance: 52,422; Referee: Roberto Rosetti

12 April 2008 33	Juventus	3–2	Milan	Turin
20:30 CEST (UTC+02:00)	Del Piero 12'; Salihamidžić 45', 80'	Report	Inzaghi 14', 31'	Stadium: Stadio Olimpico; Attendance: 22,703; Referee: Gianluca Rocchi

20 April 2008 34	Milan	5–1	Reggina	Milan
15:00 CEST (UTC+02:00)	Kaká 8' (pen.), 34' (pen.), 68'; Inzaghi 73'; Pato 89'	Report	Barreto 40'	Stadium: San Siro; Attendance: 55,274; Referee: Stefano Farina

27 April 2008 35	Livorno	1–4	Milan	Livorno
15:00 CEST (UTC+02:00)	Knežević 73'	Report	Inzaghi 22', 51', 58'; Seedorf 71'	Stadium: Stadio Armando Picchi; Attendance: 14,504; Referee: Emidio Morganti

4 May 2008 36	Milan	2–1	Inter	Milan
15:00 CEST (UTC+02:00)	Inzaghi 51'; Kaká 56'	Report	Cruz 76'	Stadium: San Siro; Attendance: 81,766; Referee: Roberto Rosetti

11 May 2008 37	Napoli	3–1	Milan	Naples
15:00 CEST (UTC+02:00)	Hamšík 36'; Domizzi 69' (pen.); Garics 90+2'	Report	Seedorf 90+4'	Stadium: Stadio San Paolo; Attendance: 56,144; Referee: Stefano Farina

18 May 2008 38	Milan	4–1	Udinese	Milan
15:00 CEST (UTC+02:00)	Pato 48'; Inzaghi 59'; Cafu 79'; Seedorf 88'	Report	Mesto 32'	Stadium: San Siro; Attendance: 65,829; Referee: Roberto Rosetti

=== Coppa Italia ===
==== Round of 16 ====
20 December 2007 First leg	Milan	1–2	Catania	Milan
20:45 CET (UTC+01:00)	Paloschi 59'	Report	Spinesi 19'; Mascara 26'	Stadium: San Siro; Attendance: 4,156; Referee: Mauro Bergonzi

16 January 2008 Second leg	Catania	1–1 (3–2 agg.)	Milan	Catania
20:30 CET (UTC+01:00)	Vargas 12'	Report	Paloschi 68'	Stadium: Stadio Angelo Massimino; Attendance: 21,000; Referee: Nicola Ayroldi

=== UEFA Champions League ===
==== Group stage ====
Pos	Team	Pld	W	D	L	GF	GA	GD	Pts	Qualification
1	(Italy) Milan	6	4	1	1	12	5	+7	13	Advance to knockout stage
2	(Scotland) Celtic	6	3	0	3	5	6	−1	9	Advance to knockout stage
3	(Portugal) Benfica	6	2	1	3	5	6	−1	7	Transfer to UEFA Cup
4	(Ukraine) Shakhtar Donetsk	6	2	0	4	6	11	−5	6	

Source: RSSSF

18 September 2007 1	Milan (Italy)	2–1	(Portugal) Benfica	Milan, Italy
20:45 CEST (UTC+02:00)	Pirlo 9'; Inzaghi 24', (yellow card) 67'	Report	Cardozo (yellow card) 61'; Nuno Gomes 90+2'	Stadium: San Siro; Attendance: 38,358; Referee: Mike Riley (England)

3 October 2007 2	Celtic (Scotland)	2–1	(Italy) Milan	Glasgow, Scotland
20:45 CEST (UTC+02:00)	Brown (yellow card) 31'; McManus 61'; Donati (yellow card) 69'; McDonald (yellow card) 71', (goal) 89'	Report	Ambrosini (yellow card) 51'; Kaká 68' (pen.); Nesta (yellow card) 72'	Stadium: Celtic Park; Attendance: 58,642; Referee: Markus Merk (Germany)

24 October 2007 3	Milan (Italy)	4–1	(Ukraine) Shakhtar Donetsk	Milan, Italy
20:45 CEST (UTC+02:00)	Gilardino 6', 14'; Gattuso (yellow card) 20'; Ambrosini (yellow card) 44'; Seedorf 62', 69'	Report	Brandão (yellow card) 20'; Lucarelli 51', (yellow card) 69'; Fernandinho (yellow card) 74'	Stadium: San Siro; Attendance: 36,850; Referee: Luis Medina Cantalejo (Spain)

6 November 2007 4	Shakhtar Donetsk (Ukraine)	0–3	(Italy) Milan	Donetsk, Ukraine
20:45 CET (UTC+01:00)	Fernandinho (yellow card) 45'; Ilsinho (yellow card) 45+1'	Report	Gattuso (yellow card) 19'; Kaká (yellow card) 32', (goal) 72'; Inzaghi 66', 90+3'; Ambrosini (yellow card) 71'	Stadium: RSC Olimpiyskiy; Attendance: 25,700; Referee: Pieter Vink (Netherlands)

28 November 2007 5	Benfica (Portugal)	1–1	(Italy) Milan	Lisbon, Portugal
20:45 CET (UTC+01:00)	M. Pereira 20'; Petit (yellow card) 68'	Report	Pirlo 15'; Kaladze (yellow card) 36'; Serginho (yellow card) 41'; Maldini (yellow card) 80'	Stadium: Estádio da Luz; Attendance: 46,034; Referee: Herbert Fandel (Germany)

4 December 2007 6	Milan (Italy)	1–0	(Scotland) Celtic	Milan, Italy
20:45 CET (UTC+01:00)	Inzaghi 70'	Report	Brown (yellow card) 46'	Stadium: San Siro; Attendance: 38,409; Referee: Tom Henning Øvrebø (Norway)

==== Knockout phase ====
===== Round of 16 =====
20 February 2008 First leg	Arsenal (England)	0–0	(Italy) Milan	London, England
20:45 CET (UTC+01:00)	Senderos (yellow card) 70'; Eboué (yellow card) 81'	Report	Pato (yellow card) 33'	Stadium: Emirates Stadium; Attendance: 60,082; Referee: Claus Bo Larsen (Denmark)

4 March 2008 Second leg	Milan (Italy)	0–2 (0–2 agg.)	(England) Arsenal	Milan, Italy
20:45 CET (UTC+01:00)	Inzaghi (yellow card) 55'; Kaká (yellow card) 80'; Pirlo (yellow card) 85'	Report	Hleb (yellow card) 33'; Eboué (yellow card) 56'; Clichy (yellow card) 72'; Fàbregas 84'; Adebayor 90+2'	Stadium: San Siro; Attendance: 81,879; Referee: Konrad Plautz (Austria)

=== UEFA Super Cup ===
31 August 2007	Milan (Italy)	3–1	(Spain) Sevilla	Monaco
20:45 CEST (UTC+02:00)	Gattuso (yellow card) 7'; Inzaghi 55'; Jankulovski 62'; Kaká 87'		Renato 14'; Duda (yellow card) 68'; Poulsen (yellow card) 70'	Stadium: Stade Louis II; Attendance: 17,822; Referee: Konrad Plautz (Austria)

=== FIFA Club World Cup ===
13 December 2007 Semi-finals	Urawa Red Diamonds (Japan)	0–1	(Italy) Milan	Yokohama, Japan
19:30	Abe (yellow card) 52'; Nenê (yellow card) 83'		Nesta (yellow card) 6'; Seedorf 68'	Stadium: International Stadium Yokohama; Attendance: 67,005; Referee: Jorge Larrionda (Uruguay)

16 December 2007 Final	Boca Juniors (Argentina)	2–4	(Italy) Milan	Yokohama, Japan
19:30	Palacio 22'; Ibarra (yellow card) 40'; Battaglia (yellow card) 55'; Paletta (yellow card) 73'; Ledesma 85', (red card) 88'		Inzaghi 21', 71'; Ambrosini (yellow card) 22'; Nesta 50'; Kaká 61', (yellow card) 62'; Kaladze (red card) 77'	Stadium: Nissan Stadium; Attendance: 68,263; Referee: Marco Rodríguez (Mexico)

== Statistics ==
=== Appearances and goals ===
No.	Pos	Nat	Player	Total		Serie A		Champions League		Coppa Italia	
No.	Pos	Nat	Player	Apps	Goals	Apps	Goals	Apps	Goals	Apps	Goals
16	GK	(Australia) AUS	Kalac	32	-33	25	-27	4+1	-3	2	-3
44	DF	(Italy) ITA	Oddo	32	1	21+4	1	5+1	0	1	0
13	DF	(Italy) ITA	Nesta	36	1	28+1	1	7	0	0	0
4	DF	(Georgia (country)) GEO	Kaladze	39	0	30+2	0	6+1	0	0	0
19	DF	(Italy) ITA	Favalli	30	0	19+7	0	2	0	2	0
8	MF	(Italy) ITA	Gattuso	40	1	30+1	1	8	0	1	0
10	MF	(Netherlands) NED	Seedorf	39	9	31+1	7	7	2	0	0
21	MF	(Italy) ITA	Pirlo	42	5	32+1	3	8	2	1	0
23	MF	(Italy) ITA	Ambrosini	40	4	31+2	4	7	0	0	0
22	MF	(Brazil) BRA	Kaká	38	17	30	15	8	2	0	0
11	FW	(Italy) ITA	Gilardino	38	9	20+10	7	3+4	2	1	0
1	GK	(Brazil) BRA	Dida	17	-15	13	-11	4	-4	0	0
25	DF	(Italy) ITA	Bonera	28	0	17+4	0	4+2	0	1	0
3	DF	(Italy) ITA	Maldini	21	1	15+2	1	2+2	0	0	0
9	FW	(Italy) ITA	Inzaghi	26	15	14+7	11	4+1	4	0	0
7	FW	(Brazil) BRA	Pato	20	9	13+5	9	2	0	0	0
32	MF	(Italy) ITA	Brocchi	29	0	10+14	0	1+2	0	2	0
18	DF	(Czech Republic) CZE	Jankulovski	17	0	10+4	0	2+1	0	0	0
2	DF	(Brazil) BRA	Cafu	18	1	8+7	1	1	0	2	0
5	MF	(Brazil) BRA	Emerson	20	0	6+9	0	0+3	0	2	0
27	MF	(Brazil) BRA	Serginho	14	0	5+6	0	2+1	0	0	0
20	MF	(France) FRA	Gourcuff	20	1	4+11	1	0+3	0	2	0
99	FW	(Brazil) BRA	Ronaldo	6	2	4+2	2	0	0	0	0
43	FW	(Italy) ITA	Paloschi	9	4	1+6	2	0	0	2	2
17	DF	(Croatia) CRO	Simic	7	0	1+3	0	1	0	2	0
31	DF	(Brazil) BRA	Digão	3	0	0+1	0	0	0	2	0
36	DF	(Italy) ITA	Darmian	1	0	0	0	0	0	1	0
29	GK	(Italy) ITA	Fiori	0	0	0	0	0	0	0	0
30	GK	(Italy) ITA	Offredi	0	0	0	0	0	0	0	0
38	DF	(Italy) ITA	Bruscagin	0	0	0	0	0	0	0	0
45	DF	(Italy) ITA	Ruggeri	0	0	0	0	0	0	0	0
46	DF	(Italy) ITA	Romagnoli	0	0	0	0	0	0	0	0
34	MF	(France) FRA	Ba	0	0	0	0	0	0	0	0
37	MF	(Italy) ITA	Ancelotti	0	0	0	0	0	0	0	0
39	MF	(Italy) ITA	Caraglia	0	0	0	0	0	0	0	0
40	MF	(Italy) ITA	Guerci	0	0	0	0	0	0	0	0
41	FW	(France) FRA	Aubameyang	0	0	0	0	0	0	0	0
42	FW	(Nigeria) NGA	Umunegbu	1	0	0	0	0	0	1	0
94	FW	(France) FRA	Aubameyang	1	0	0	0	0	0	1	0

- Source: http://calcio-seriea.net/presenze/2007/1313/

=== Goalscorers ===
Rank	Name	Serie A	Coppa Italia	UEFA Champions League	UEFA Super Cup	FIFA Club World Cup	Total
1	(Brazil) Kaká	15	–	2	1	1	19
2	(Italy) Filippo Inzaghi	11	–	4	1	2	18
3	(Netherlands) Clarence Seedorf	7	–	2	–	1	10
4	(Brazil) Alexandre Pato	9	–	–	–	–	9
4	(Italy) Alberto Gilardino	7	–	2	–	–	9
6	(Italy) Andrea Pirlo	3	–	2	–	–	5
7	(Italy) Alberto Paloschi	2	2	–	–	–	4
7	(Italy) Massimo Ambrosini	4	–	–	–	–	4
9	(Brazil) Ronaldo	2	–	–	–	–	2
9	(Italy) Alessandro Nesta	1	–	–	–	1	2
12	(Brazil) Cafu	1	–	–	–	–	1
12	(Czech Republic) Marek Jankulovski	–	–	–	1	–	1
12	(France) Yoann Gourcuff	1	–	–	–	–	1
12	(Italy) Paolo Maldini	1	–	–	–	–	1
12	(Italy) Massimo Oddo	1	–	–	–	–	1
12	(Italy) Gennaro Gattuso	1	–	–	–	–	1

=== Goals conceded ===
Rank	Name	Serie A	Coppa Italia	UEFA Champions League	UEFA Super Cup	FIFA Club World Cup	Total	Average per game
1	(Brazil) Dida	11 (13)	0 (0)	4 (4)	1 (1)	2 (2)	18 (20)	0.90
2	(Australia) Zeljko Kalac	27 (25)	3 (2)	3 (5)	0 (0)	0 (0)	33 (32)	1.03

=== Discipline ===
Rank	Name	Serie A		Coppa Italia		UEFA Champions League		UEFA Super Cup		FIFA Club World Cup		Total		
Rank	Name	Yellow card	Red card	Yellow card	Red card	Yellow card	Red card	Yellow card	Red card	Yellow card	Red card	Yellow card	Red card	Total Cards
1	(Italy) Gennaro Gattuso	11	0	1	0	2	0	1	0	0	0	15	0	15
2	(Italy) Massimo Ambrosini	9	1	0	0	3	0	0	0	1	0	13	1	14
3	(Italy) Andrea Pirlo	8	0	1	0	0	0	0	0	0	0	9	0	9
4	(Italy) Giuseppe Favalli	7	0	0	0	0	0	0	0	0	0	7	0	7
4	(Italy) Alessandro Nesta	4	1	0	0	1	0	0	0	1	0	6	1	7
5	(Brazil) Kaká	3	0	0	0	2	0	0	0	1	0	6	0	6
5	(Georgia (country)) Kakha Kaladze	4	0	0	0	1	0	0	0	0	1	5	1	6
7	(Italy) Daniele Bonera	4	1	0	0	0	0	0	0	0	0	4	1	5
8	(Brazil) Cafu	3	0	1	0	0	0	0	0	0	0	4	0	4
8	(Italy) Alberto Gilardino	4	0	0	0	0	0	0	0	0	0	4	0	4
8	(Italy) Massimo Oddo	3	0	1	0	0	0	0	0	0	0	4	0	4
11	(Brazil) Emerson	2	0	1	0	0	0	0	0	0	0	3	0	3
11	(Italy) Filippo Inzaghi	1	0	0	0	2	0	0	0	0	0	3	0	3
13	(Czech Republic) Marek Jankulovski	2	0	0	0	0	0	0	0	0	0	2	0	2
13	(Italy) Paolo Maldini	1	0	0	0	1	0	0	0	0	0	2	0	2
13	(Brazil) Alexandre Pato	1	0	0	0	1	0	0	0	0	0	2	0	2
13	(Netherlands) Clarence Seedorf	2	0	0	0	0	0	0	0	0	0	2	0	2
13	(Brazil) Serginho	1	0	0	0	1	0	0	0	0	0	2	0	2
18	(Italy) Cristian Brocchi	1	0	0	0	0	0	0	0	0	0	1	0	1
18	(France) Yoann Gourcuff	1	0	0	0	0	0	0	0	0	0	1	0	1

== Sources ==
- "AC Milan Group 2007 Annual Report" (PDF). AC Milan (in Italian). Archived from the original (pdf) on 25 April 2011.
- "AC Milan Group 2008 Annual Report" (PDF). AC Milan (in Italian). April 2009 [approx.] Archived from the original (PDF) on 14 May 2013.
