= Master of Sport of Russia, International Class =

Highest sports title in the Russian Federation

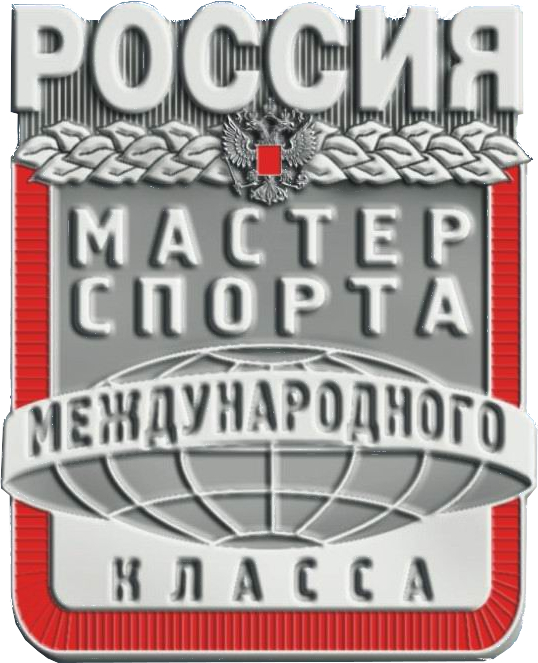
Badge of "Master of Sport of Russia, International Class"

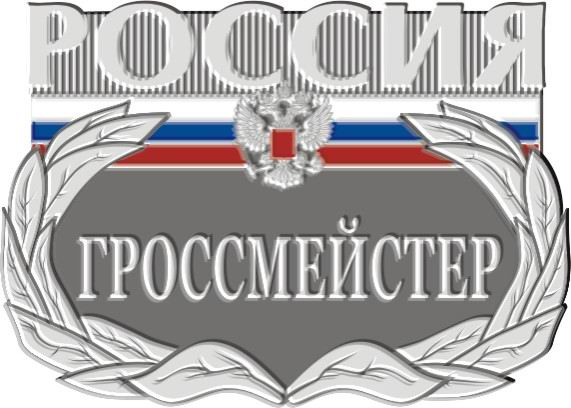
Badge of "Grandmaster of Russia"

The Master of Sport of Russia, International Class (Russian: Мастер спорта России международного класса, abbreviated as MSMK) is the highest sports title awarded in the Russian Federation.

In certain sports, different equivalent titles are used, in accordance with established traditions. For instance, in chess, draughts, and go, the equivalent title is Grandmaster of Russia. In equestrian sports, titles such as International Class Master Rider and International Class Master Jockey are used. These titles are considered equal in rank; the specific name used varies between sports according to the established traditions of each discipline.

== Awarding procedure ==
The title of Master of Sport of Russia, International Class is awarded by the federal executive authority responsible for physical culture and sports, based on the recommendation of:

- a regional executive authority in the field of physical culture and sports, with supporting documentation approved by the relevant all-Russian sports federation (union or association) accredited by the federal authority; or
- specially authorized subdivisions of federal executive bodies — in the case of departmental sports.

To be awarded the title, an athlete must meet the required standards while participating in official international competitions as a member of the national team of Russia. The title may also be awarded for setting or equaling a European record or a world record.

If the qualification system for a particular sport includes only ranking standards and Russian athletes have won a medal at the most recent Olympic Games, Paralympic Games, or Deaflympic Games, the title may also be awarded based on results achieved at the Russian Championships or the Russian Cup.

== See also ==
- Unified Sports Classification System of the USSR and Russia
