= Kubok =

Kubok may refer to:

- Azerbaijan Cup
- Kazakhstan Cup
- Russian Cup (disambiguation), any of several Russian sports competitions
- Ukrainian Cup, a national knockout cup competition in Ukrainian football
- logic puzzle
