= Valentina Simonova =

Russian swimming coach

Valentina Ivanovna Simonova
- Born: July 6, 1960 (age 65)
- Occupation: Swimming coach
- Awards: Honored Coach of Russia; Order of Friendship of Peoples; Honored Worker of Physical Culture of the Russian Federation; Medal of the Order "For Merit to the Fatherland" II class; Gold Medal "For Outstanding Services to the Omsk Region"; Badge of Honor "For Merit in the Development of Physical Culture and Sports"

Valentina Ivanovna Simonova (born July 6, 1960) is a Russian swimming coach, honored as a Honored Coach of Russia and Honored Worker of Physical Culture of the Russian Federation. She specializes in coaching athletes with musculoskeletal disorders.

== Biography ==
Valentina Simonova has been working as a swimming coach for athletes with musculoskeletal disorders since 1989.

In 1999, following the merger of SDYUSSHOR No. 6 and DUSSH No. 29 in Omsk, she was appointed the director of the newly united sports school.

== Achievements and notable students ==
Simonova has coached numerous athletes who achieved high results in swimming:

- Dmitri Poline – Honoured Master of Sport of Russia, champion of the 2004 Summer Paralympics in Athens, 2006 world champion, world record holder, recipient of the Order of Friendship of Peoples.
- Ruslan Sadvakasov – Master of Sports of International Class, participant of the 2008 Summer Paralympics in Beijing.
- Dmitry Ostapchuk – Master of Sports of International Class, participant of the 2000 Summer Paralympics in Sydney.
- Nikolai Ponomaryov – Master of Sports of International Class, finalist at the 1992 Summer Paralympics in Barcelona.
- Yuri Likarovsky – Master of Sports, participant of the 1992 Summer Paralympics in Barcelona, multiple-time Russian champion and medalist.

== Awards ==
Simonova has received several awards and honors, including:

- Order of Friendship of Peoples
- Medal of the Order "For Merit to the Fatherland" II class
- Gold Medal "For Outstanding Services to the Omsk Region"
- Badge of Honor "For Merit in the Development of Physical Culture and Sports"
