= Kaká =

Brazilian footballer (born 1982)

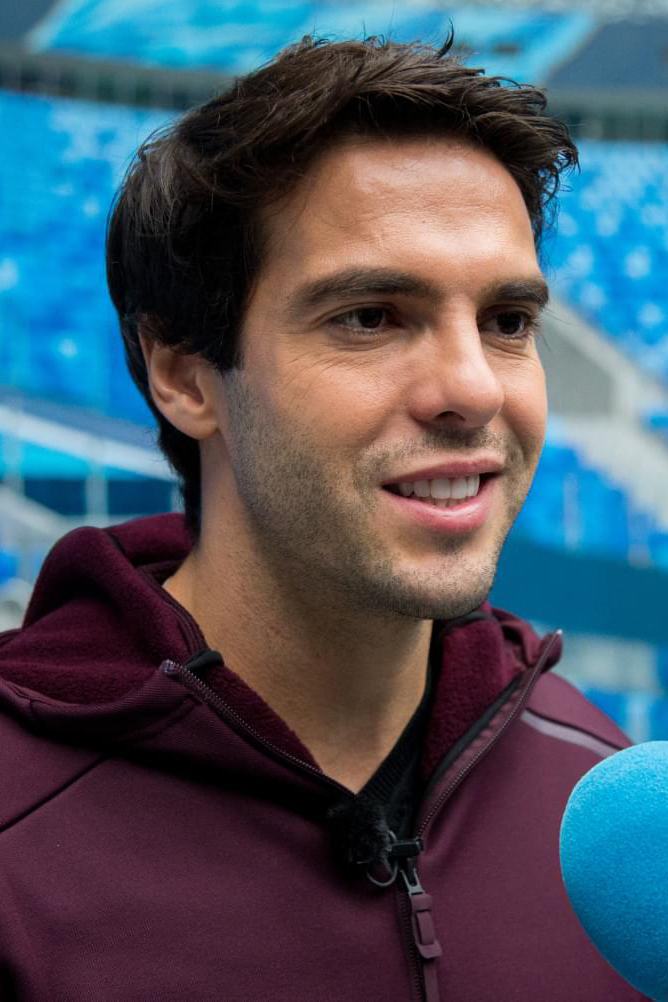
- Kaká in 2018

Personal information
- Full name: Ricardo Izecson dos Santos Leite
- Date of birth: 22 April 1982 (age 44)
- Place of birth: Gama, Federal District, Brazil
- Height: 1.86 m (6 ft 1 in)
- Position: Attacking midfielder

Youth career
- 1994–2000: São Paulo

Senior career*
Years	Team	Apps	(Gls)
2000–2003	São Paulo	59	(23)
2003–2009	AC Milan	193	(70)
2009–2013	Real Madrid	85	(23)
2013–2014	AC Milan	30	(7)
2014–2017	Orlando City	75	(24)
2014	→ São Paulo (loan)	19	(2)
Total		461	(149)

International career
2001	Brazil U20	5	(1)
2002–2016	Brazil	92	(29)
Medal record
Men's Football
Representing Brazil
FIFA World Cup
Winner	2002 Korea/Japan
FIFA Confederations Cup
Winner	2005 Germany
Winner	2009 South Africa
CONCACAF Gold Cup
Runner-up	2003 United States–Mexico
- * Club domestic league appearances and goals

Ricardo Izecson dos Santos Leite (Brazilian Portuguese: [ʁiˈkaʁdu iˈzɛksõ duˈsɐ̃tuz ˈlejtʃi]; born 22 April 1982), commonly known as Kaká (Brazilian Portuguese: [kaˈka]) or Ricardo Kaká, is a Brazilian former professional footballer who played as an attacking midfielder. Kaká was known for his explosive pace, dribbling, passing, and goalscoring, and is considered one of the greatest players of all time. With success for both club and country, he is one of the eleven players to win the FIFA World Cup, the UEFA Champions League, and the Ballon d'Or.

In 2001, at age 18, Kaká made his professional debut at Brazilian club São Paulo. He later joined Italian club AC Milan in 2003. Kaká helped Milan win the Serie A title in his first season. Milan finished runner-up in the 2004–05 UEFA Champions League with Kaká being the top assist provider of the tournament and being named the UEFA Club Midfielder of the Year. He led Milan to win the 2006–07 UEFA Champions League and was the tournament's top goalscorer. His performances saw him win the FIFA World Player of the Year, the 2007 Ballon d'Or, and the UEFA Club Footballer of the Year. After six years with Milan, Kaká joined Real Madrid in 2009 for a transfer fee of €67 million, which was the second highest transfer fee at the time. However, his four seasons in Madrid were plagued with injuries, which saw his pace decline. He returned to AC Milan for a single season in 2013, prior to joining MLS expansion club Orlando City SC. He initially went on loan to his former club São Paulo before returning to Orlando in 2015 and retiring from professional football in 2017.

Kaká made his debut for Brazil's national football team in 2002 and was selected for the 2002 FIFA World Cup squad, which won the tournament that year. He also played in the 2006 World Cup, alongside other veterans like Ronaldo, Adriano, and Ronaldinho. He made his final World Cup appearance in 2010. He was also a member of Brazil's 2005 and 2009 FIFA Confederations Cup-winning squads, winning the Golden Ball in 2009 as the tournament's best player.

Between 2006 and 2009, he was named in both the FIFA World XI and the UEFA Team of the Year three times. In 2010, he was named in the AC Milan Hall of Fame. One of the world's most famous athletes during his playing career, Kaká was the first sportsperson to amass 10 million followers on Twitter. Outside of football, Kaká is known for his humanitarian work, where he became the youngest ambassador of the UN World Food Programme in 2004. For his contributions on and off the pitch, Kaká was named by Time as one of the world's 100 most influential people in 2008 and in 2009.

== Early life ==
Ricardo Izecson dos Santos Leite was born on 22 April 1982 in Gama in the Federal District of the Central-West Region of Brazil to Simone dos Santos, an elementary school Teacher, and Bosco Izecson Pereira Leite, a civil engineer. His family was financially secure, which allowed him to focus on school and football at the same time. His younger brother Digão and cousin Eduardo Delani are also professional footballers. Digão called him "Caca" due to his inability to pronounce "Ricardo" when they were young; it eventually evolved into Kaká. The word has no specific Portuguese translation.

When he was seven, Kaká's family moved to São Paulo. His school had arranged him in a local youth club called "Alphaville", who qualified to the final in a local tournament. There, he was discovered by hometown club São Paulo FC, who offered him a place in the youth academy. At the age of 18, Kaká suffered a career-threatening spinal fracture as a result of a swimming pool accident, but made a full recovery. He attributes his recovery to God and has since tithed his income to his church.

== Club career ==
=== São Paulo ===
Kaká began his career with São Paulo at the age of eight. He signed a contract at 15 and led the São Paulo youth squad to Copa de Juvenil glory. He made his senior side debut on 1 February 2001 and scored 12 goals in 27 appearances, in addition to leading São Paulo to its first and only Torneio Rio-São Paulo championship, in which he scored two goals in two minutes as a substitute against Botafogo in the final, which São Paulo won 2–1.

He scored ten goals in 22 matches the following season, and by this time, his performance was soon attracting attention from European clubs. Kaká made a total of 58 appearances for São Paulo, scoring 23 times.

=== AC Milan ===
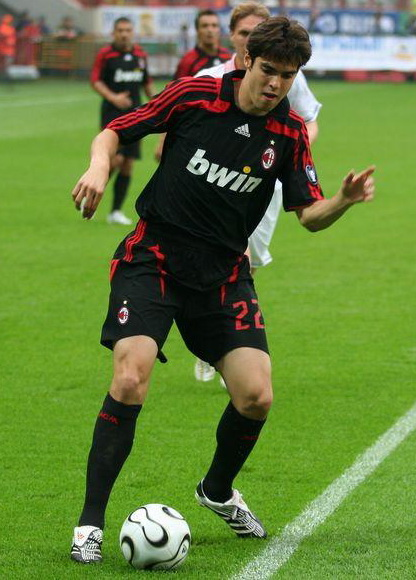
Kaká playing in Moscow with AC Milan in 2007

The steady European interest in Kaká culminated in his signing with the European champions, Italian club AC Milan, in 2003 for a fee of reported €8.5 million, described in retrospect as "peanuts" by club owner Silvio Berlusconi. Within a month, he cracked the starting lineup, replacing Rui Costa in the attacking midfield playmaking position, behind strikers Jon Dahl Tomasson, Filippo Inzaghi and Andriy Shevchenko. His Serie A debut was in a 2–0 win over Ancona. He scored ten goals in 30 appearances that season, also providing several important assists, such as the cross which led to Shevchenko's title-deciding headed goal, as Milan won the Scudetto and the UEFA Super Cup, whilst finishing as runner up in the Intercontinental Cup and the 2003 Supercoppa Italiana. Milan also reached the semi-finals of the Coppa Italia, losing out to eventual winners Lazio, and were knocked out of the quarter-finals of the Champions League by Deportivo La Coruña. Due to his performances in his debut season, in 2004, Kaká was named Serie A Footballer of the Year, and was nominated for both the Ballon d'Or (finishing 15th) and the 2004 FIFA World Player of the Year (finishing 10th).

Kaká was a part of the five-man midfield in the 2004–05 season, usually playing in a withdrawn role behind striker Andriy Shevchenko. He was supported by Gennaro Gattuso and Clarence Seedorf defensively, as well as Massimo Ambrosini, allowing Kaká as the attacking midfielder and Rui Costa or Andrea Pirlo as the deep-lying playmaker to be in charge of creating Milan's goalscoring chances, forming a formidable midfield unit in both Italy and Europe. Milan began the season by winning the Supercoppa Italiana against Lazio. He scored seven goals in 36 domestic appearances as Milan finished runner-up in the Scudetto race. Milan also reached the quarter-finals of the Coppa Italia that season. Kaká played a pivotal role in Milan's Champions League campaign that season, helping them to reach the final against Liverpool, scoring two goals and providing five assists. Dubbed the "Miracle of Istanbul", Milan led 3–0 at half time, before Liverpool staged a comeback, scoring three goals in six minutes, and eventually won the match 3–2 on penalties. A match widely regarded as one of the greatest finals in the competition's history, Kaká was imperious in the first half; he first won the early free-kick which led to Paolo Maldini's opening goal, began the play that led to Hernán Crespo's first goal and Milan's second of the night, then executed a long curling pass that split open the Liverpool defence and rolled directly into the path of Crespo to score Milan's third. Kaká was once again nominated for the Ballon d'Or and FIFA World Player of the Year Awards, finishing ninth and eighth respectively, and he was named the 2005 UEFA Club Football Best Midfielder.

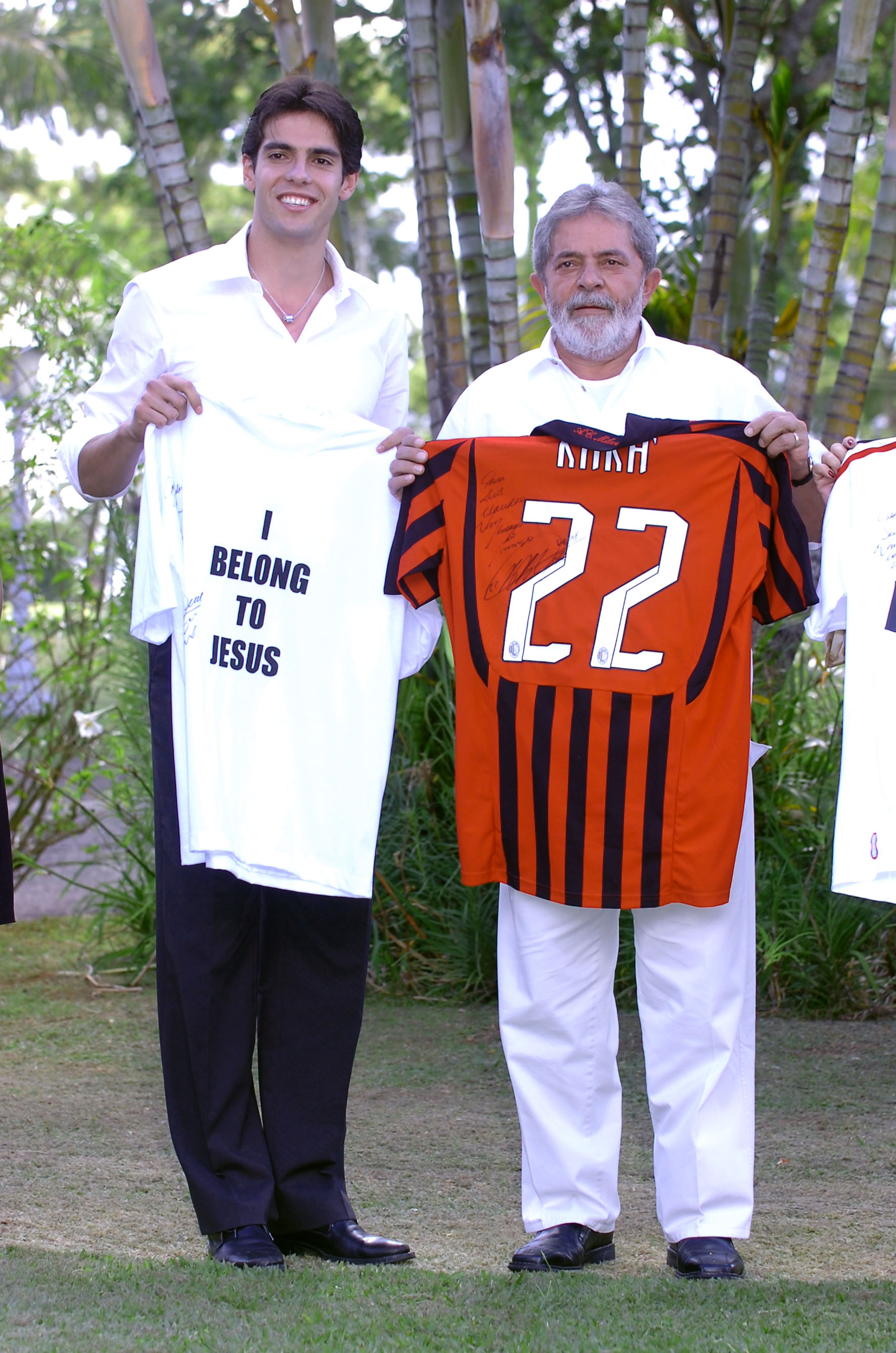
Kaká presenting a Milan jersey to then-Brazilian president Lula in 2007

The 2005–06 season saw Kaká score his first hat-tricks in domestic competitions. On 9 April 2006, he scored his first Rossoneri hat-trick against Chievo, with all three goals scored in the second half. Milan were knocked out in the semi-finals of the 2005–06 Champions League to eventual champions Barcelona, and were once again eliminated in the quarter-finals of the Coppa Italia. Milan also finished once again as runners-up in Serie A, with Kaká scoring 17 goals in the league. After the 2006 Calciopoli scandal, however, Milan were deducted 30 points, which placed them in third in the table. Kaká was nominated for the Ballon d'Or and the FIFA World Player of the Year Awards for the third consecutive year, finishing 11th and seventh respectively. He was also selected to be part of both the UEFA Team of the Year and the FIFPro World XI for the first time in his career.

Andriy Shevchenko's departure to Chelsea for the 2006–07 season allowed Kaká to become the focal point of Milan's offense as he alternated between the midfield and forward positions, operating at times as a striker or as a second striker behind Filippo Inzaghi, as well as in his more typical attacking midfield position. On 2 November 2006, he scored his first Champions League hat-trick in a 4–1 group stage win over the Belgian side Anderlecht. He finished as the top scorer in the 2006–07 Champions League campaign with ten goals. One of the goals helped the Rossoneri eliminate Celtic in the round of 16, 1–0 on aggregate, and he scored three goals against Manchester United in the semi-finals. Milan also reached the semi-finals of the Coppa Italia that season, losing out to winners Roma, and finished fourth in Serie A.

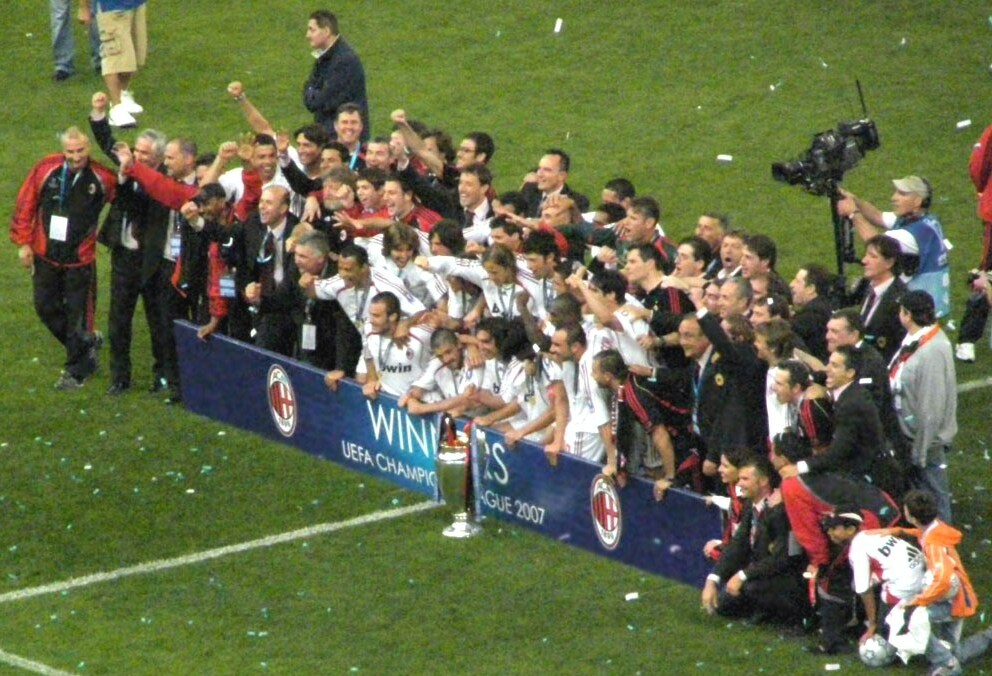
Kaká celebrating the 2007 UEFA Champions League triumph with his Milan teammates. A number of individual accolades followed for Kaká

Kaká won the Champions League title when Milan defeated Liverpool 2–1 on 23 May 2007, avenging the previous loss on penalties two years before. Though he went scoreless, he won a free kick that led to the first of Filippo Inzaghi's two goals, and provided the assist for the second. On 30 August, Kaká was named by UEFA as both the top forward of the 2006–07 Champions League season and UEFA Club Footballer of the Year, as well as being named as part of the UEFA Team of the Year for the second time. He once again finished as the second-best assist-provider of the Champions League, providing five, and was voted the 2007 IFFHS World's Best Playmaker.

Milan began its 2007–08 season by winning the UEFA Super Cup on 31 August, defeating Sevilla 3–1, with Kaká scoring the third goal. Kaká had made a dribbling run into Sevilla's area, winning a penalty, which he then proceeded to take. Although it was saved by goalkeeper Andrés Palop, Kaká scored on the rebound with a header. Kaká had previously hit the post in the first half. He played his 200th career match with Milan in a 1–1 home draw with Catania on 30 September, scoring from a penalty, and on 5 October, he was named the 2006–07 FIFPro World Player of the Year, and was elected as part of the FIFPro World XI for the second time in his career. On 2 December 2007, Kaká became the eighth Milan player to win the Ballon d'Or, as he finished with a decisive 444 votes, well ahead of Cristiano Ronaldo and Lionel Messi. He signed a contract extension through 2013 with Milan on 29 February 2008.

"He's the complete player."

— Pelé on Kaká after he was named the 2007 FIFA World Player of the Year.

On 16 December, Kaká won the FIFA Club World Cup against Boca Juniors, scoring Milan's third goal of the match in a 4–2 victory which allowed them to be crowned World Champions. Kaká had previously assisted Filippo Inzaghi's opening goal of the match and also assisted Inzaghi's final goal of the match after an impressive exchange with Clarence Seedorf; he was awarded the Golden Ball as the best player of the competition. On 17 December, Kaká was voted the 2007 FIFA World Player of the Year with 1,047 votes, ahead of Lionel Messi with 504 and Cristiano Ronaldo with 426.

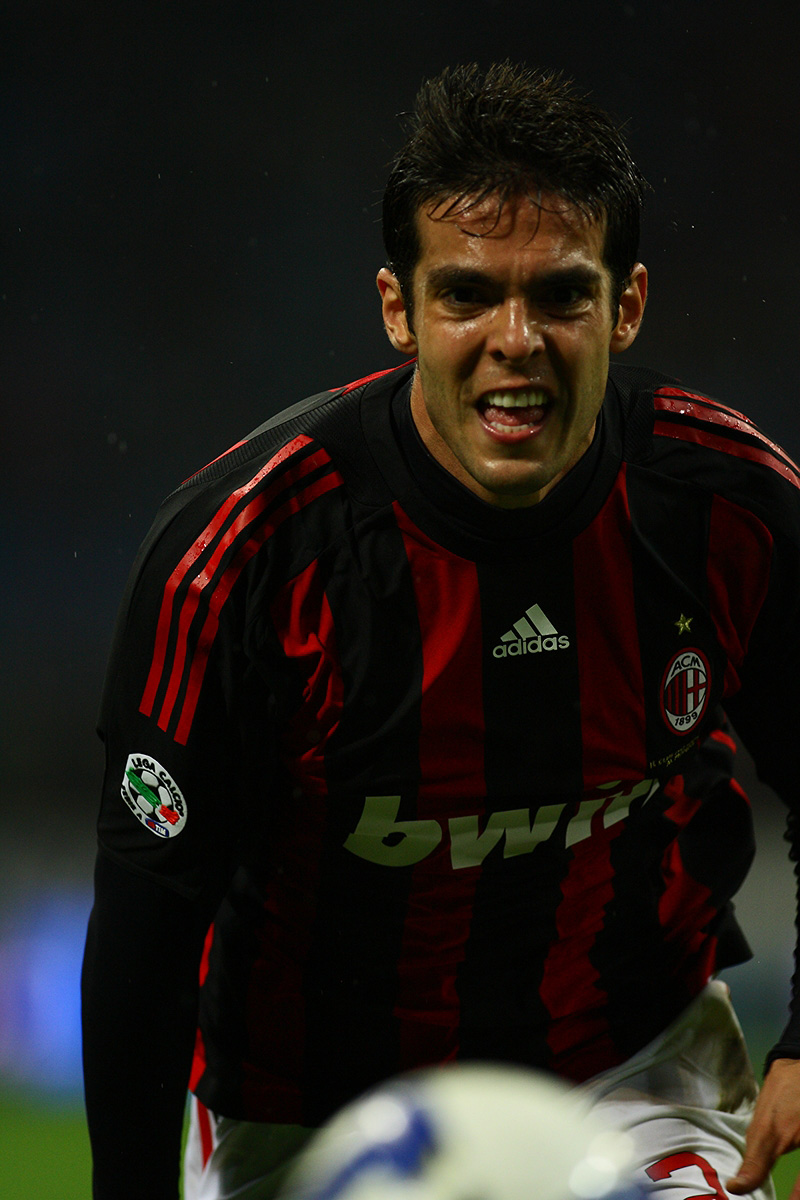
Kaká in action with Milan against Torino in April 2009

In January 2008, Kaká was also named the 2007 Serie A Footballer of the Year, winning the award for the second time in his career. His contributions on and off the pitch saw Time magazine name Kaká in the Time 100 list on 2 May. On 14 October, he cast his footprints into the Estádio do Maracanã's sidewalk of fame, in a section dedicated to the memory of the country's top players. Kaká finished the 2007–08 season with 15 goals in Serie A. His best goals included a curling strike from 30 yards into the top corner against Lazio, a powerful strike from the edge of the 18-yard box against Cagliari, and a now trademark slalom run past a number of Udinese players before bending the ball into the bottom corner. He was nominated as a finalist for the 2008 FIFA World Player of the Year, finishing fourth, and was nominated for the Ballon d'Or, finishing in eighth. He was named in the six-man shortlist for the 2008 Laureus World Sportsman of the Year, and was selected in the FIFPro World XI for the third time in his career. He was named in the Time 100 again in 2009.

The BBC reported on 13 January 2009 that Manchester City made a bid for Kaká for over £100 million. Milan Director Umberto Gandini replied that Milan would only discuss the matter if Kaká and Manchester City agreed to personal terms. Kaká initially responded by telling reporters he wanted to "grow old" at Milan and dreamed of captaining the club one day, but later said, "If Milan want to sell me, I'll sit down and talk. I can say that as long as the club don't want to sell me, I'll definitely stay." On 19 January, Silvio Berlusconi announced that Manchester City had officially ended their bid after a discussion between the clubs, and that Kaká would remain with Milan. Milan supporters had protested outside the club headquarters earlier that evening, and later chanted outside Kaká's home, where he saluted them by flashing his jersey outside a window. Kaká finished his final season with Milan by scoring 16 goals, helping Milan finish third in Serie A, and once again being elected as a finalist for the FIFA World Player of the Year Award, finishing fourth in voting for the second-straight year. He was also nominated for the Ballon d'Or award, finishing in sixth place, and was named in the UEFA Team of the Year for the third time in his career.

=== Real Madrid ===
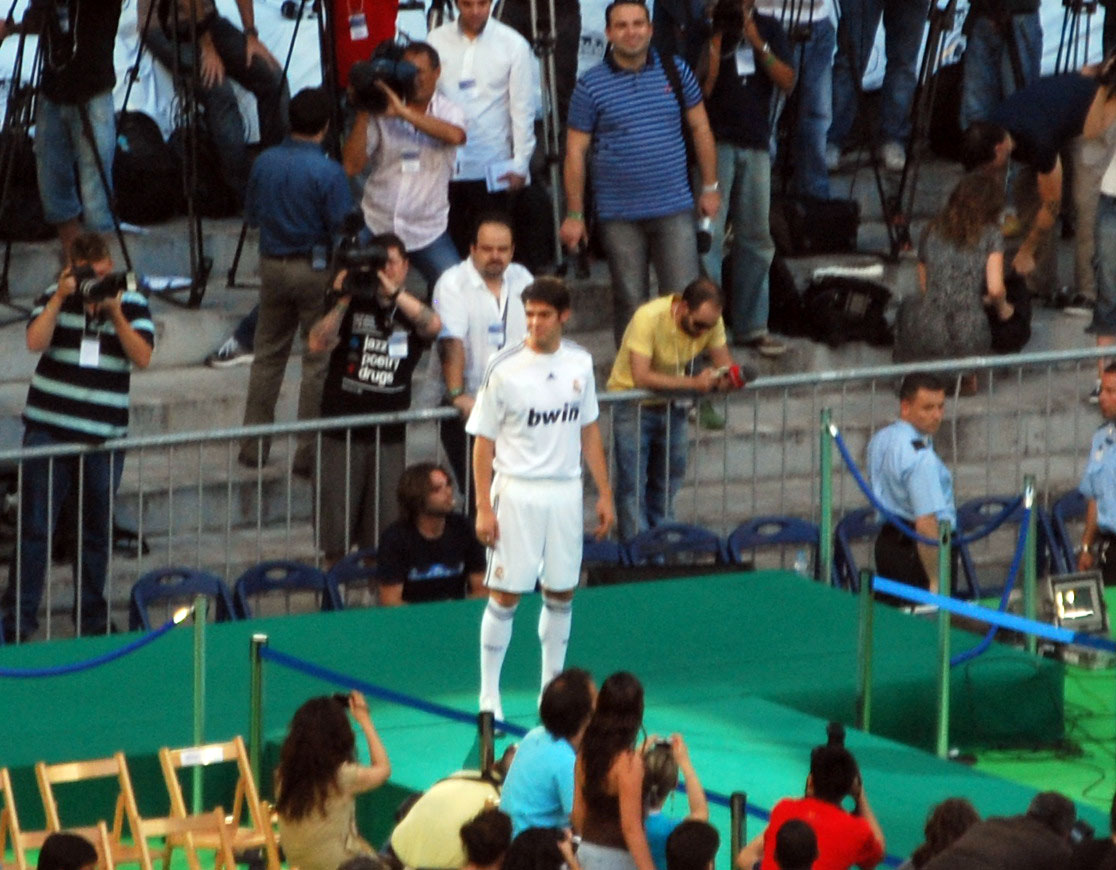
Kaká during his presentation at Real Madrid in June 2009

On 3 June 2009, it was reported that newly elected Real Madrid president Florentino Pérez had offered to buy Kaká from Milan for a reported €68.5 million, two days after the player had left for international duty with Brazil. Milan vice-chairman and CEO Adriano Galliani confirmed that he and Kaká's father, Bosco Leite, had traveled to Madrid to meet with Pérez: "We had lunch and spoke about Kaká. I don't deny it. Negotiations exist, but a deal has yet to be done." On 4 June, Galliani told Gazzetta dello Sport that financial reasons were his motive for the talks with Real Madrid: "We cannot allow [Milan] to lose €70 million ... The reasons behind Kaká's departure would be economic." On 8 June, Milan and Real Madrid confirmed Kaká's move to the Santiago Bernabéu Stadium on a six-year deal for €67 million fee.

Kaká was unveiled as a Real Madrid player on 30 June 2009, and he made his unofficial debut on 7 August 2009 in a 5–1 friendly victory against Toronto FC. He scored his first goal for Madrid during a pre-season match on 19 August 2009, in a 5–0 victory against Borussia Dortmund. Kaká later made his league debut on 29 August 2009 in a 3–2 win against Deportivo de La Coruña. He scored his first goal, a penalty, on 23 September in a 2–0 win against Villarreal. Real Madrid finished the season as runners-up in La Liga, with Kaká scoring eight goals and providing six assists in La Liga, and nine goals and eight assists in all competitions.

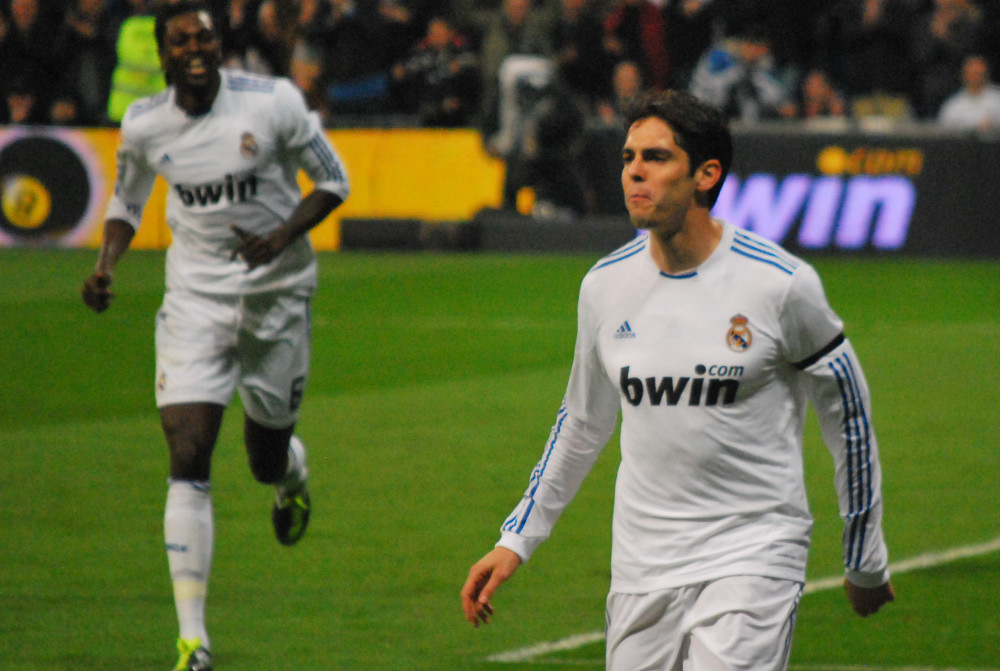
Kaká celebrating a goal with Real Madrid in a 4–1 home victory over Real Sociedad in February 2011

On 5 August 2010, Real Madrid announced that Kaká had undergone a successful surgery on a long-standing left knee injury and would face up to four months on the sidelines. Kaká returned to training after a long lay-off, with manager José Mourinho commenting that having Kaká back from injury was like a new signing. After an eight-month absence, Kaká returned to play by entering as a substitute for Karim Benzema on the 77th minute of a 3–2 victory over Getafe on 3 January 2011. He said he was "(...) happy for playing a game again and for stepping onto a pitch." His first league goal (and his first of the season) after his return from injury came with an assist from Cristiano Ronaldo on a 4–2 victory over Villarreal on 9 January 2011.

In March 2011, Kaká suffered from Iliotibial band syndrome, which kept him sidelined for a few weeks. After returning from injury, he appeared in a convincing win over Valencia, scoring two goals. At the end of his second season with the club, Real Madrid and Kaká had won the Copa del Rey, although they finished as runners-up in both La Liga and in the Supercopa de España to rivals Barcelona. Real Madrid were also knocked out of the Champions League by Barcelona in the semi-finals of the competition. Kaká finished his season with seven goals and six assists in all competitions in 20 appearances.

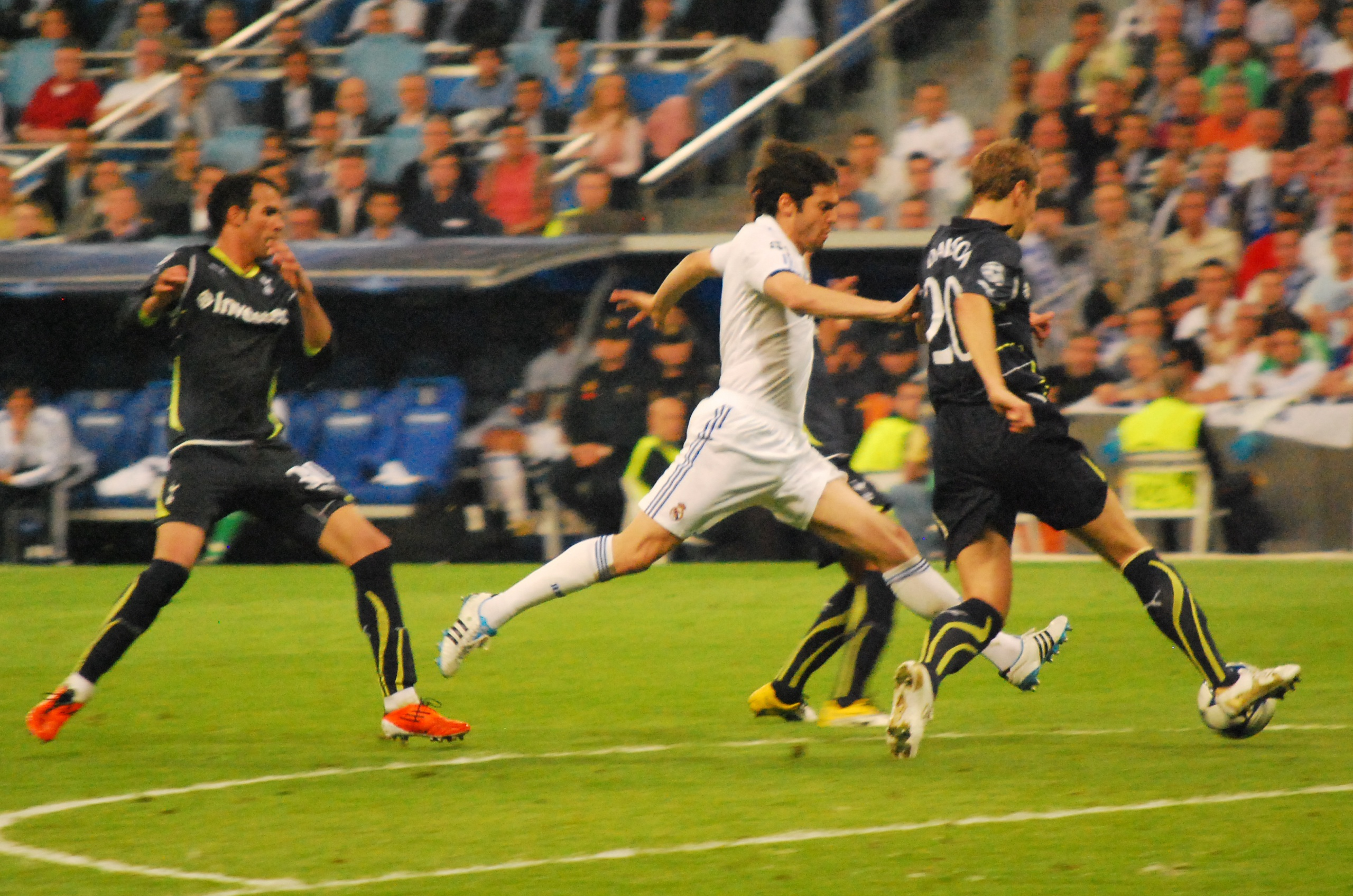
Kaká takes on Tottenham Hotspur defender Michael Dawson in the UEFA Champions League, April 2011

On 27 September 2011, Kaká experienced one of his best matches as a Real Madrid player during a 3–0 victory over Ajax in the Champions League, as he scored one goal, provided one assist and participated in one of the best team build-ups of the matchday: a counterattacking move involving Mesut Özil, Cristiano Ronaldo and Karim Benzema. Kaká was later chosen the best player of the Champions League Matchday. With this match, Kaká experienced one of the best starts to a season he has ever had, scoring two goals, serving two assists and winning one penalty for his team. In 2011–12, Real Madrid won La Liga with a record 100 points that year, with Kaká providing nine assists and scoring five goals in the competition. They were, however, eliminated for the second year in a row in the semi-finals of the Champions League, losing out to eventual runners-up Bayern Munich on penalties. The decisive misses for Real Madrid were by Ronaldo, Kaká and Sergio Ramos. He finished the season with eight goals and 14 assists in all club competitions. Real Madrid were eliminated in the quarter-finals of the Copa del Rey by eventual winners Barcelona.

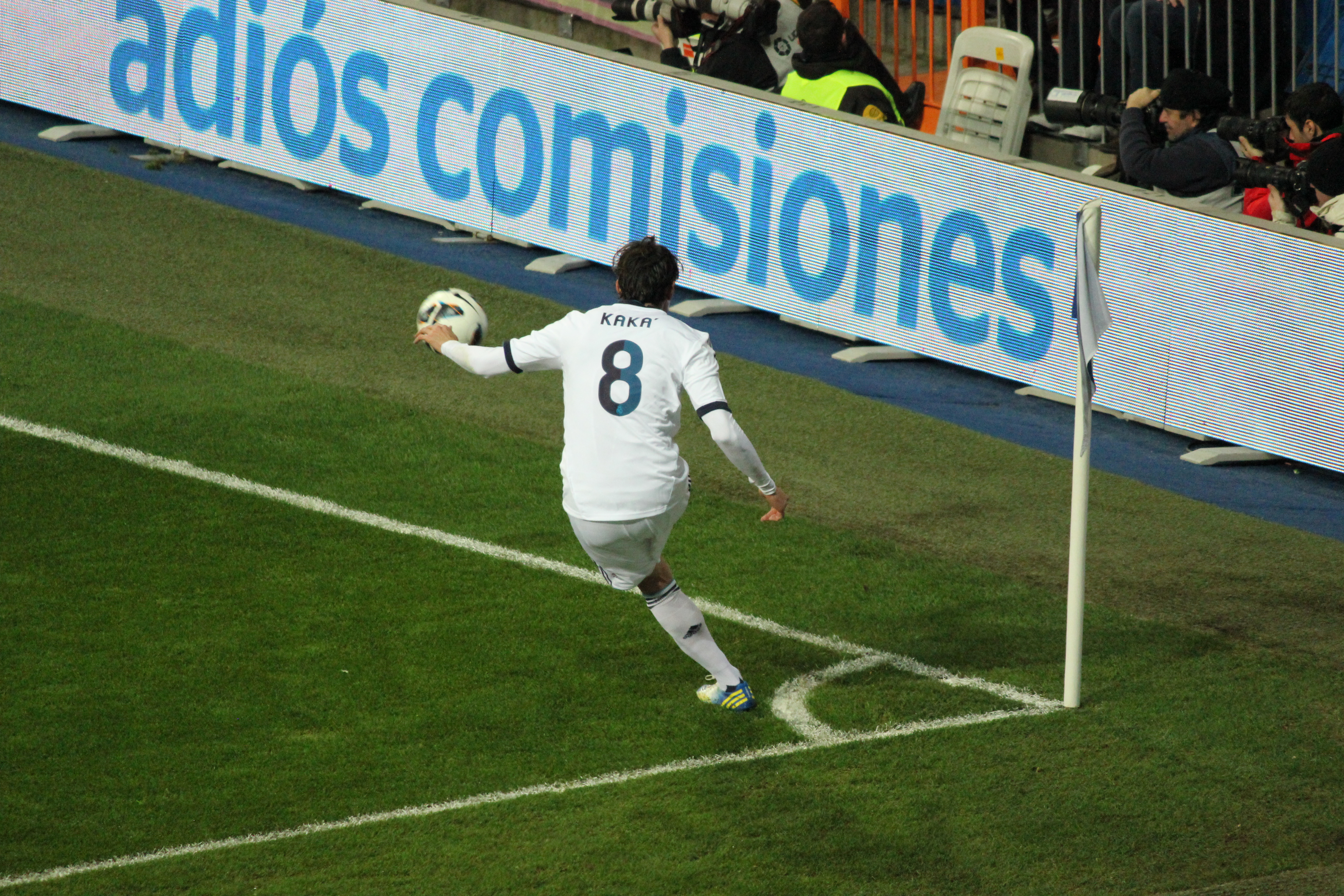
Kaká takes a corner kick for Real Madrid in a La Liga game against Sevilla in February 2013

Real Madrid began the 2012–13 season by winning the 2012 Supercopa de España against rivals Barça. On 4 December 2012, after scoring in a 4–1 win against Ajax, Kaká became the top Brazilian goalscorer in Champions League history, with 28 goals. After the match, Kaká said, "This was an important goal for me, and I hope I've still got goals left to help Real Madrid. It was an important win and a special night." Kaká came on just before an hour was played, but was sent off as he was booked twice within 18 minutes in a 0–0 draw against Osasuna on 12 January 2013. It was his first sending-off at Madrid since he joined from Milan in 2009 and his first red card since he was dismissed playing for Brazil against Ivory Coast at the 2010 FIFA World Cup. Real Madrid finished the season in second place in La Liga behind Barcelona, and also finished runners-up in the Copa del Rey to city rivals Atlético Madrid. They were eliminated in the semi-finals of the Champions League for the third consecutive year by eventual runners-up Borussia Dortmund.

On 29 August 2013, Kaká expressed his desire to leave Real Madrid, having scored 29 goals and provided 32 assists in 120 appearances in all competitions over four seasons at the club. He said goodbye to Real Madrid and its fans in an open letter on Twitter.

=== Return to AC Milan ===
Milan confirmed that Kaká would join the club on 2 September 2013 from Real Madrid on a free transfer with only performance-related incentives owed to Madrid; after agreeing to personal terms, he signed a two-year contract. Kaká's contract was worth €4 million net per year and he was given the number 22 shirt, the same number he wore for Milan during his first spell. He was also made the vice-captain upon his arrival. He captained Milan in his debut for his second spell, taking the armband from goalkeeper Marco Amelia in a match against Chiasso.

Kaká tore his left adductor muscle during his first competitive appearance, deciding not to accept any wages from Milan whilst he regained fitness. He made his return for Milan on 19 October after coming on as a 76th-minute substitute in a 1–0 home victory against Udinese. In his next match, on 22 October, Kaká assisted Robinho in the 1–1 home draw against Barcelona in the Champions League. His first goal, described by ESPN as "a sensational curling shot from the edge of the area into the top right-hand corner," opened the scoring in a 1–1 home draw at San Siro to Lazio on 30 October. On 7 January 2014, Kaká scored his 100th goal for Milan by an opening goal in a match against Atalanta; he later went on to score another goal 30 minutes later. On 11 March he scored a goal against Atlético Madrid in Vicente Calderón Stadium, this goal made him the last player to score against Atlético Madrid at Vicente Calderón for three seasons in knockout phase until Isco scored against them in 2016–17 UEFA Champions League semi final. On 29 March 2014, Kaká scored twice in a 3–0 win against Chievo, his 300th match for Milan.

In June 2014, it was reported that Kaká had entered into advanced discussions with Orlando City SC to join the team in January 2015 when they enter Major League Soccer (MLS). On 30 June 2014, Kaká had his Milan contract terminated through mutual consent despite having a year remaining, by activating a release clause as a result of the team not qualifying for European competitions.

=== Orlando City ===
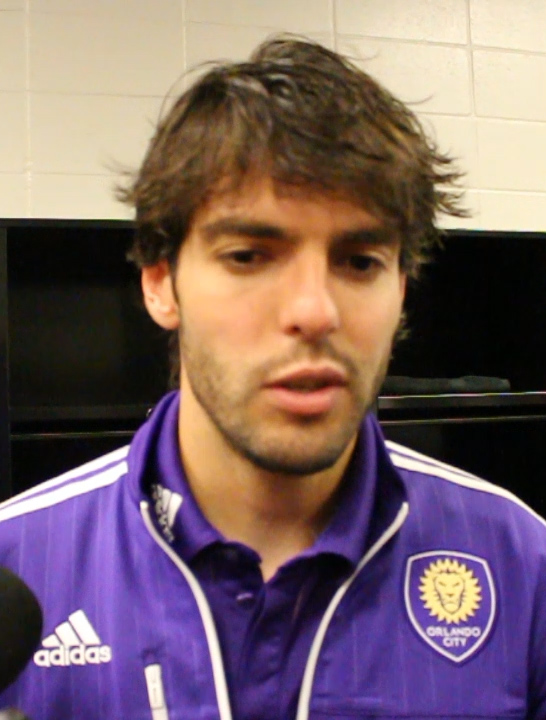
Kaká postgame in Houston, March 2015

Kaká joined future MLS franchise Orlando City as their first Designated Player. He stated that he had "always" wanted to play in the United States, and cited the Brazilian owner Flávio Augusto da Silva as a reason for signing. Until Orlando entered the league in 2015, Kaká was loaned to his first club São Paulo, which he called "really satisfying".

By signing for Orlando City, Kaká became the highest-paid player in MLS history, with a base salary of US$6.6 million per year, and with a guaranteed compensation of $7.2 million per year.

==== Loan to São Paulo ====
On 3 July 2014, Kaká arrived at São Paulo and began training the next day. He made his comeback in a league match against Goiás on 27 July 2014, starting and scoring a goal in the 76th minute, although his team lost 2–1. On 4 September 2014, in the second round of the Copa Sudamericana, Kaká scored in a 2–0 victory over Criciúma. On 9 November 2014, Kaká scored the winning goal in a 2–1 victory over Vitória.

==== Return to Orlando City ====
Kaká scored in his first match for Orlando City, a 4–0 friendly win over FC Dallas. He then scored again in a 1–1 friendly draw against New York City FC. On 8 March 2015, Kaká scored a free kick for the equaliser in a 1–1 draw on his MLS debut against New York City FC at the Citrus Bowl, the first in Orlando City's competitive history. Kaká scored one and assisted another in a 2–2 draw with Montreal Impact on 28 March 2015. He came second in the Etihad Airways MLS Player of the Month poll for his performances in March.

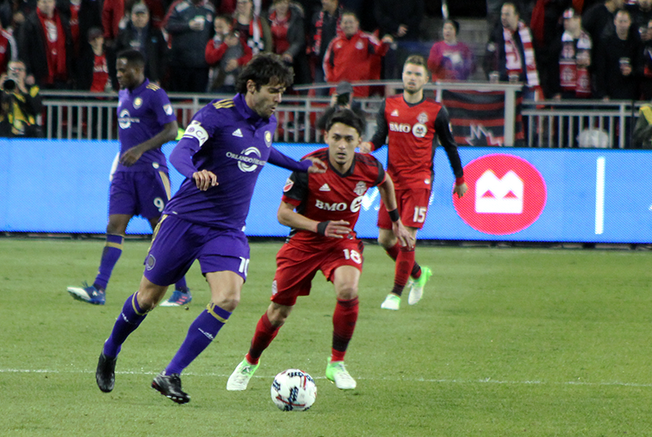
Kaká in a match against Toronto FC in May 2017

On 13 April 2015, Kaká scored a penalty against Portland Timbers in a 2–0 win. On 17 May 2015, Kaká scored one and assisted another in Orlando City's 4–0 win over defending MLS champions LA Galaxy. By doing so, Orlando became the first expansion team to beat a defending MLS champion by more than a three-goal margin. On 30 June, Kaká scored Orlando's opening goal in the 21st minute of his Open Cup debut, helping his team to a 2–0 home win over Columbus Crew, in the fifth round of the competition, which enabled the club to advance to the quarter-finals. On 5 July, he received the first straight red card of his career in a 1–1 away draw against Real Salt Lake; he had previously scored a goal during the match. Later that month, Kaká was named to the 2015 MLS All-Star Game as the team's captain. During the MLS All-Star Game on 29 July, at the Dick's Sporting Goods Park in Commerce City, Colorado, he scored from a penalty and later assisted David Villa as the MLS All-Stars defeated Tottenham Hotspur 2–1; Kaká was named MVP of the match. Despite his efforts, he was unable to help Orlando City become the first expansion team to qualify for the MLS Cup Playoffs since Seattle Sounders FC in 2009, as Orlando narrowly missed out on the sixth seed spot in the Eastern Conference; he ended his first season with 9 goals and 7 assists in 28 MLS appearances, also scoring another goal from two appearances in the 2015 MLS Open Cup.

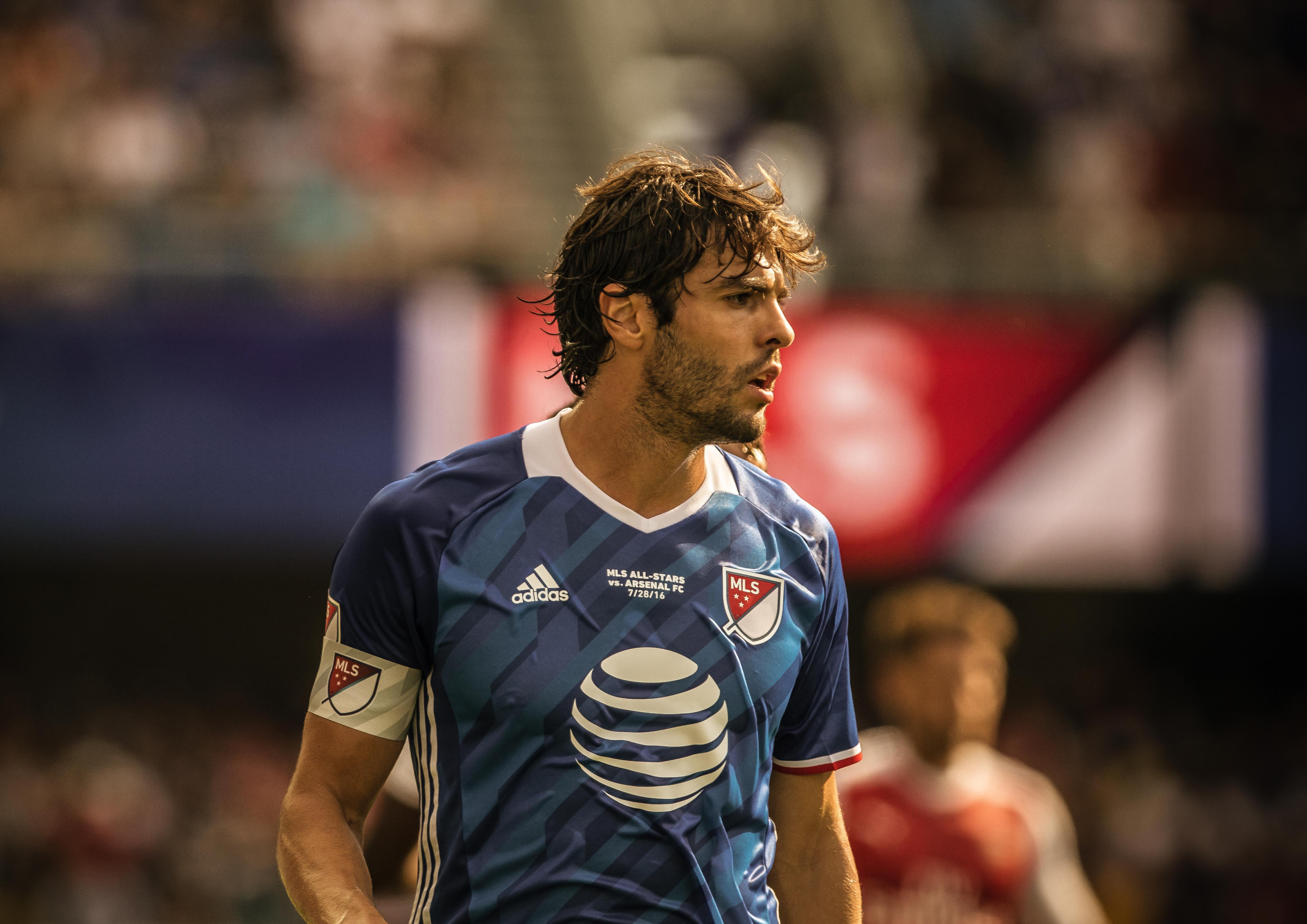
Kaká with the MLS All-Star team in 2016

After initially being sidelined through injury and missing Orlando City's first three matches of the 2016 MLS season, Kaká returned to the team's starting line-up and made his first appearance of the season on 3 April, against the Portland Timbers; he assisted two goals and later scored one himself in a 4–1 home victory, and was subsequently named Player of the Week for his performance. In July 2016, he was included in the roster for the 2016 MLS All-Star Game. He finished his second MLS season with the club with 9 goals and 10 assists in 24 appearances, as Orlando once again failed to qualify for the MLS Cup Playoffs.

On 5 March 2017, in Orlando City's opening match of the MLS season against New York City, and the club's stadium debut, Kaká hit the turf clutching his left leg just minutes after the game had started; the Lions beat their opponents 1–0. Later, it was reported that Kaká would be out for 6 weeks due to a hamstring strain. Kaká came back in action and he scored on his return in Orlando City 2–0 win over Colorado Rapids on 29 April. The next week, he scored another goal in Orlando's 2–1 loss against Toronto FC. He scored his third goal of the season in a 2–2 draw against Sporting KC on 13 May 2017. On 14 June, he played in the 3–1 loss in U.S. Open Cup match against Miami FC which was coached by his former teammate Alessandro Nesta. On 17 June he assisted Matías Pérez García's goal against Montreal Impact. The following match, he provided another assist for Scott Sutter last minute equalizer against Seattle Sounders. On 7 July, he was chosen to play for the 2017 MLS All-Star Game for the third consecutive season. On 6 October, Kaká was awarded Goal of the Week for his goal against the New England Revolution in a 6–1 rout nine days earlier.

Orlando City were officially eliminated from playoff contention on 7 October, following New York Red Bulls's 3–0 victory over Vancouver Whitecaps FC. Kaká announced on 11 October 2017 that he would not be renewing his contract with Orlando City for the 2018 MLS season. He played his last official match for Orlando on 15 October in a 1–0 home defeat against Columbus Crew; he finished the 2017 MLS season with 6 goals and 5 assists in 23 league appearances. He later appeared once more for Orlando, in a 6–1 home win over the Puerto Rican national team in the Fuerza Puerto Rico friendly, held on 5 November, to raise money for Hurricane Maria relief. In total, Kaká made 75 league appearances in his three seasons with Orlando, scoring 24 goals and providing 22 assists.

=== Retirement ===
Kaká announced his retirement on 17 December 2017, after turning down offers from his former clubs São Paulo and AC Milan. He also expressed interest in working as a director, confirming that Milan had offered him a role.

== International career ==
=== Youth career and early senior career ===
Kaká was called up for the 2001 FIFA World Youth Championship, but the Brazilians crashed out to Ghana in the quarter-finals. Several months later, he made his debut for the senior Brazil squad in a friendly match against Bolivia on 31 January 2002. He was part of Brazil's 2002 FIFA World Cup-winning squad in Korea/Japan, but played only 25 minutes, all of which were in the 5–2 first round victory against Costa Rica on 13 June.

In 2003, Kaká was the captain for the 2003 CONCACAF Gold Cup, where Brazil, competing with their under-23 team, finished as runner-up to Mexico. He scored three goals during the tournament.

=== First Confederations Cup title and 2006 World Cup ===
Kakà was included in Brazil's squad for 2005 FIFA Confederations Cup in Germany. He appeared in all five matches and scored one goal in a 4–1 win over Argentina in the final.

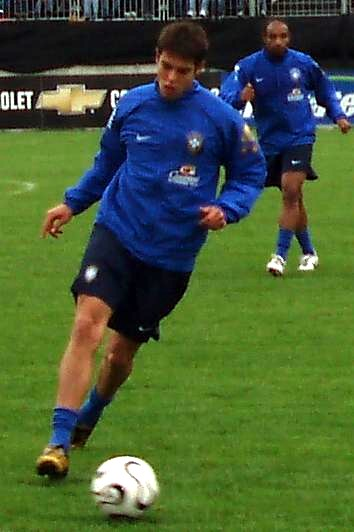
Kaká training with Brazil prior to the start of the 2006 FIFA World Cup

Kaká made his first FIFA World Cup finals start in 2006 and scored his first and only goal of the tournament with a 25-yard strike in Brazil's 1–0 victory over Croatia in Brazil's opener, for which he was named Man of the Match. Kaká was unable to keep up the momentum for the remainder of the tournament, as Brazil was eliminated by France in the quarter-finals with French star Thierry Henry scoring the winner.

In 2006 he was part of the "magic quartet". Kaká and Ronaldinho in midfield, backed up by strikers Ronaldo and Adriano. The team was top heavy and unbalanced, and forced to work back in midfield, Kaká paid the price.

— Tim Vickery writing for ESPN on Brazil's disappointing 2006 World Cup.

In a friendly against rivals Argentina at the Emirates Stadium, London on 3 September 2006, after entering as a substitute, Kaká received the ball off a deflection from an Argentina corner kick and outran Lionel Messi while taking the ball down three quarters of the field to score. Exhibiting his "fantastic acceleration and balletic grace" (according to Carl Anka for the BBC), Kaká regards it as the greatest goal he ever scored. On 12 May 2007, citing an exhaustive schedule of Serie A, Champions League and national team play, Kaká bowed out of the 2007 Copa América, which Brazil won. After missing out on the Copa América, he returned to play in Brazil's friendly match against Algeria on 22 August 2007. On 11 October 2008, Kaká opened the scoring for Brazil in their 4–0 win against Venezuela in a qualification game for the 2010 FIFA World Cup.

=== Second Confederations Cup title and 2010 World Cup ===
Kaká participated in the 2009 FIFA Confederations Cup, wearing the number 10 shirt, marking his first international tournament since the 2006 World Cup. His only two goals came in Brazil's group stage opener against Egypt on 14 June, when he scored a goal in the fifth minute and then added a 90th-minute penalty in Brazil's 4–3 victory. Kaká also provided two assists throughout the tournament. He received the Golden Ball as the player of the tournament at the Confederations Cup and was also named the Man of the Match in the final after helping Brazil to a 3–2 win against the United States.

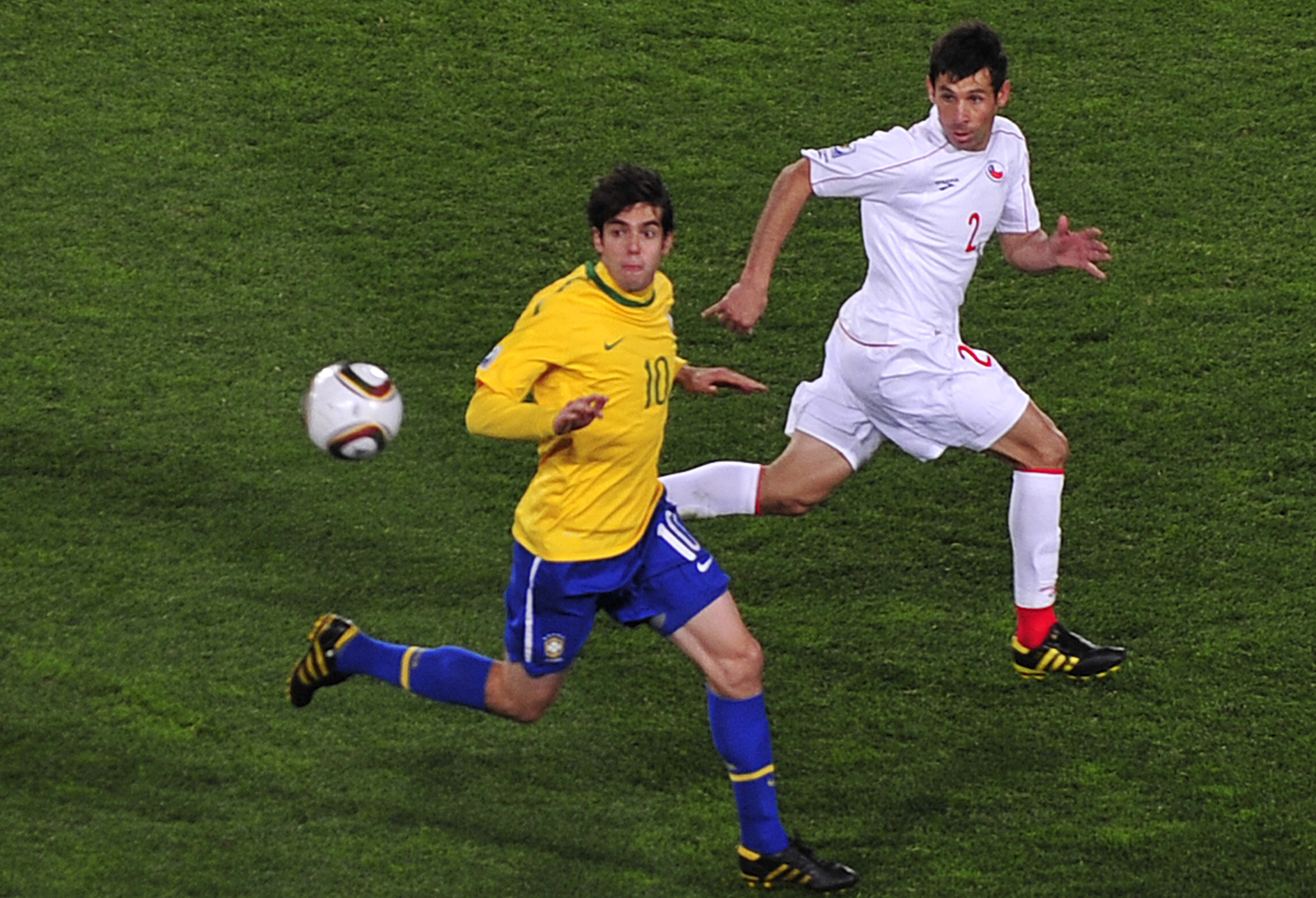
Kaká (left) playing for Brazil against Chile at the 2010 World Cup

At the 2010 World Cup in South Africa, during the match against Ivory Coast on 20 June, Kaká received a red card after receiving two yellow cards. The second card was given for an alleged elbow in the direction of Abdul Kader Keïta. Kaká ended the tournament with three assists in total, as the joint-top assist provider, although he failed to score a goal during the tournament. Brazil eventually ended up losing 2–1 to eventual runners-up Netherlands in the quarter-finals of the tournament.

=== Later career ===
After more than a year absence from the national team due to a series of injuries, Kaká was recalled on 27 October 2011 for the friendly matches against Gabon and Egypt in November. He later had to be removed from the squad due to a calf injury, and thus did not play either of the matches.

"The best player I have ever played with? That's Ronaldo, il Fenomeno. The other Ronaldo, Cristiano, probably makes my top five, but I have seen il Fenomeno do things nobody else has ever done."

— Kaká speaking in 2013 on his Brazil teammate Ronaldo being the best player he's played with.

After not appearing for Brazil in two years, Kaká was recalled on 28 September 2012 for the friendly matches against Iraq and Japan in October. Following his recall to the Seleção squad, Kaká stated, "I admit it was a surprise this call ... When the list was published, I was extremely happy. It was like my first call-up." Brazil coach Mano Menezes said that despite Kaká and Oscar's similarities, the two would be able to play alongside each other, as Kaká had slightly changed his playing style. On his return to the national side, Kaká scored in both matches, a 6–0 win over Iraq and a 4–0 win over Japan. Kaká retained his place in the squad for Brazil's 1,000th game in history, a 1–1 friendly draw against Colombia on 14 November 2012.

On 5 March 2013, Kaká was called up by new Brazil coach Luiz Felipe Scolari for the first time since the coach's return, for friendlies with Italy in London and Russia in Geneva, both taking place late in that month. Kaká, however, was not selected for the national team for the 2013 Confederations Cup and was also omitted from Scolari's 2014 World Cup squad. After almost 18 months, Kaká was recalled to the Brazilian team in October 2014 by new manager Dunga for friendlies against Argentina and Japan. On 1 May 2015, Kaká was selected as one of seven stand-by players in Brazil's preliminary squad for the 2015 Copa América, although he was not called up for the final tournament. In August 2015, he was called up to the national team once again for the team's international friendlies in September, and made a substitute appearance in Brazil's 1–0 victory over Costa Rica on 5 September; this was his first appearance for Brazil in almost a year, and his 90th appearance for his country overall. Following Douglas Costa's left thigh injury in late May 2016, which ruled him out of Brazil's Copa América Centenario squad, Kaká was called up as a replacement by Dunga. On 30 May, he subsequently appeared as an 80th-minute substitute in a pre-Copa América friendly warm-up match against Panama, which ended in a 2–0 victory to Brazil. A muscle injury sustained in early June, however, also ruled Kaká out of the upcoming tournament; he was replaced by Ganso.

== Style of play and reception ==
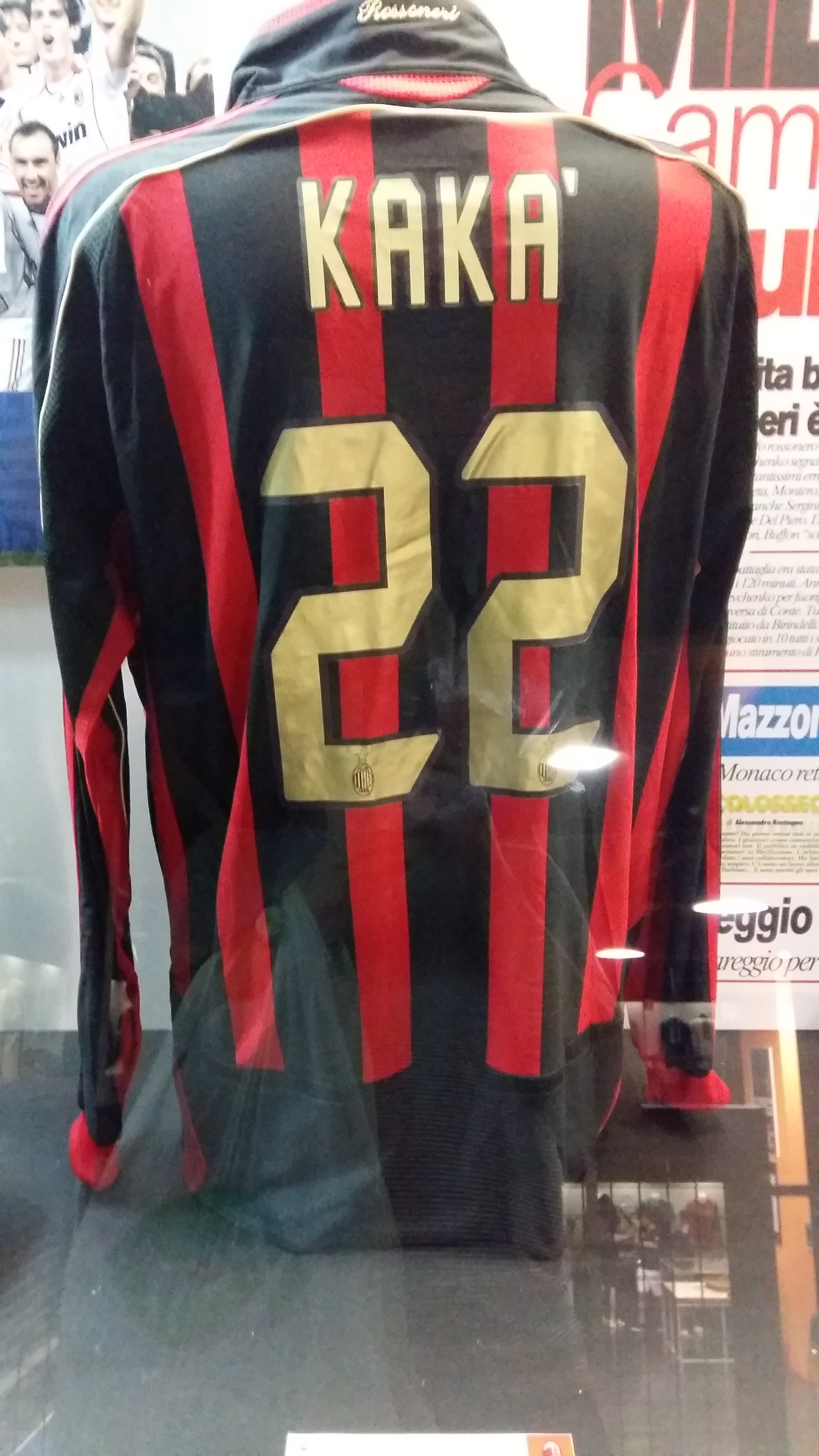
Kaká's AC Milan jersey in the San Siro museum

Widely regarded as one of the greatest players of his generation and one of the greatest midfielders in the history of the sport, Kaká has been described on the FIFA website as having the "capacity to glide almost effortlessly past opponents, provide defence-splitting passes and score consistently from distance." In his prime at Milan and prior to the injuries he suffered at Real Madrid, Kaká was an intelligent, quick, and hardworking player that could dribble past defenders in one-on-one situations as well as during counterattacks. Regarding his speed and elegance on the ball during his trademark forward runs, in 2017, Karl Matchett of Bleacher Report stated:

His gait, particularly when in possession, was mesmeric. Reasonably unusual in stature for a playmaking midfielder at a little over six feet tall, Kaká could still turn and accelerate past a defender in the same way the smaller, low-centre-of-gravity No. 10s would manage—but that same elegant, long-legged stride made him unstoppable on the run.

Tim Vickery of ESPN wrote, "Kaká running forward with the ball had the power of a freight train. He married power with finesse". He also wrote on the impact of his knee and groin issues at Madrid, adding, "once his acceleration had been reduced, he lacked the subtlety to shine as before." Carl Anka of the BBC writes that his "knee and groin problems sapped him of the explosive half-yard burst he needed to navigate the corridors of midfield uncertainty", and that by 2009, he "was already on the wane." Anka adds that because he was the last player to win FIFA World Player of the Year (in 2007) prior to the Messi-Ronaldo dominance over the next decade, Kaká's standing and recognition in football has been "lost in a haze".

Ronaldinho states, "For two, maybe three seasons [at Milan], he was the best player in the world. There was nothing he couldn't do", while his Milan teammate Andrea Pirlo adds, "There was a point when teams just had no idea how to stop him." Kaká was also renowned for his vision and passing, which allowed him to create goalscoring chances for teammates. Primarily an attacking midfielder, Kaká operated as a trequartista, and was also deployed in a free role behind the strikers. He could also play as a winger or as a second striker. During Milan's 2006–07 season, Carlo Ancelotti deployed him in a more advanced position behind a lone striker, a tactical adjustment credited by UEFA with transforming the club's campaign. During his second spell at Milan, he was also occasionally deployed in a deeper midfield role as a regista. Kaká also possessed a powerful and accurate strike with both feet, despite being naturally right-footed. He was capable of bending the ball and was also an accurate penalty taker. In 2020, 90min.com placed Kaká at number 42 in their list of "The 50 Greatest Footballers of All Time". In 2023, FourFourTwo ranked Kaká ninth on its list of the 100 greatest players of the 21st century.

== Personal life ==
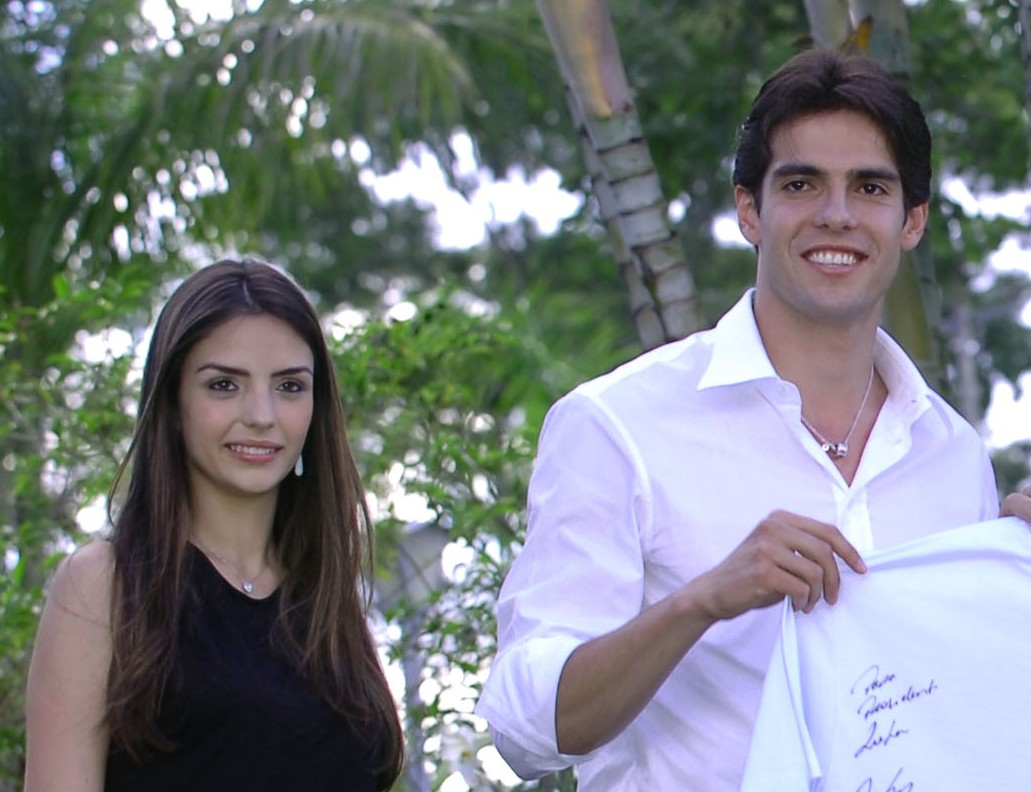
Kaká with then-wife Caroline Celico in 2007

Kaká married his childhood sweetheart Caroline Celico on 23 December 2005 at a Igreja Renascer em Cristo in São Paulo. The couple have two children, a son and a daughter. In 2015, Kaká and Celico announced their divorce via social media.

Kaká married Carolina Dias on 30 November 2019, and the couple has two daughters.

In 2024, rumors about the reasons behind his divorce from Caroline Celico began to emerge, alleging that Celico divorced Kaká because he was supposedly "too perfect". That's because, on 13 April 2024, Celico gave an interview to British newspaper The Sun about the divorce, with the newspaper subtitling one of the pictures as: "Caroline said she split from Kaká because he was ‘too perfect’", and the phrase "Kaká was too perfect" became viral. However, Celico has always and repeatedly denied saying that phrase.

Kaká gained Italian citizenship on 12 February 2007. He featured in many Adidas advertisements. He also has a modeling contract with Armani, which prevented him from appearing in a photo collection of Milan players that was published by Armani's rival, Dolce & Gabbana, in 2007.

Kaká featured on the cover of the Italian edition of EA Sports' FIFA video game FIFA 07, alongside teammate and global star Ronaldinho; he also featured on the covers of regional editions of FIFA 11, FIFA 12, and FIFA 16. He was one of the Ultimate Team Icons in FIFA 20.

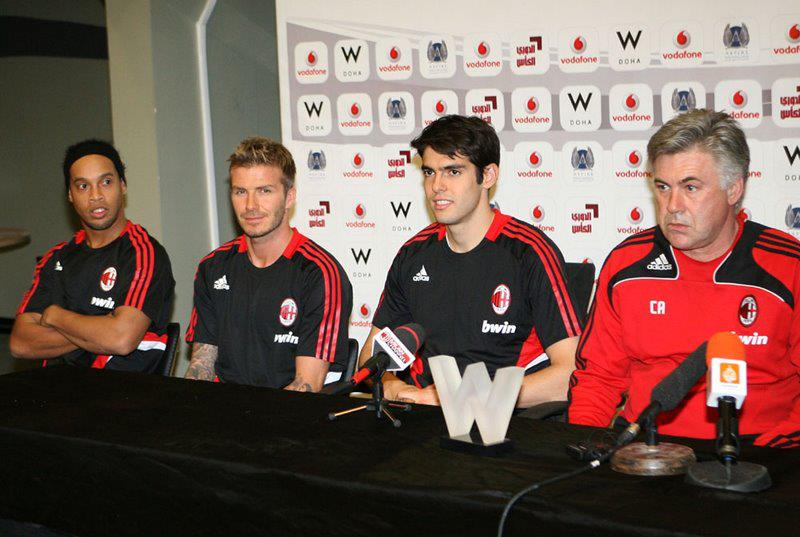
Kaká (second from right) at Milan with Ronaldinho and David Beckham to his right in 2009. The three players have a large fan base on social media.

Kaká named Raí, the former Brazilian national team and São Paulo FC captain, as his footballing role model. He is best friends with former professional footballer Marcelo Saragosa, as they served as the best man at each other's weddings. He is also close friends with Colombian striker Radamel Falcao.

In April 2012, Kaká became the first sportsperson to amass ten million followers on Twitter. In March 2015, Kaká had the fifth-highest social media following among athletes, with 33 million Facebook fans, behind Cristiano Ronaldo, Lionel Messi, David Beckham, and Neymar.

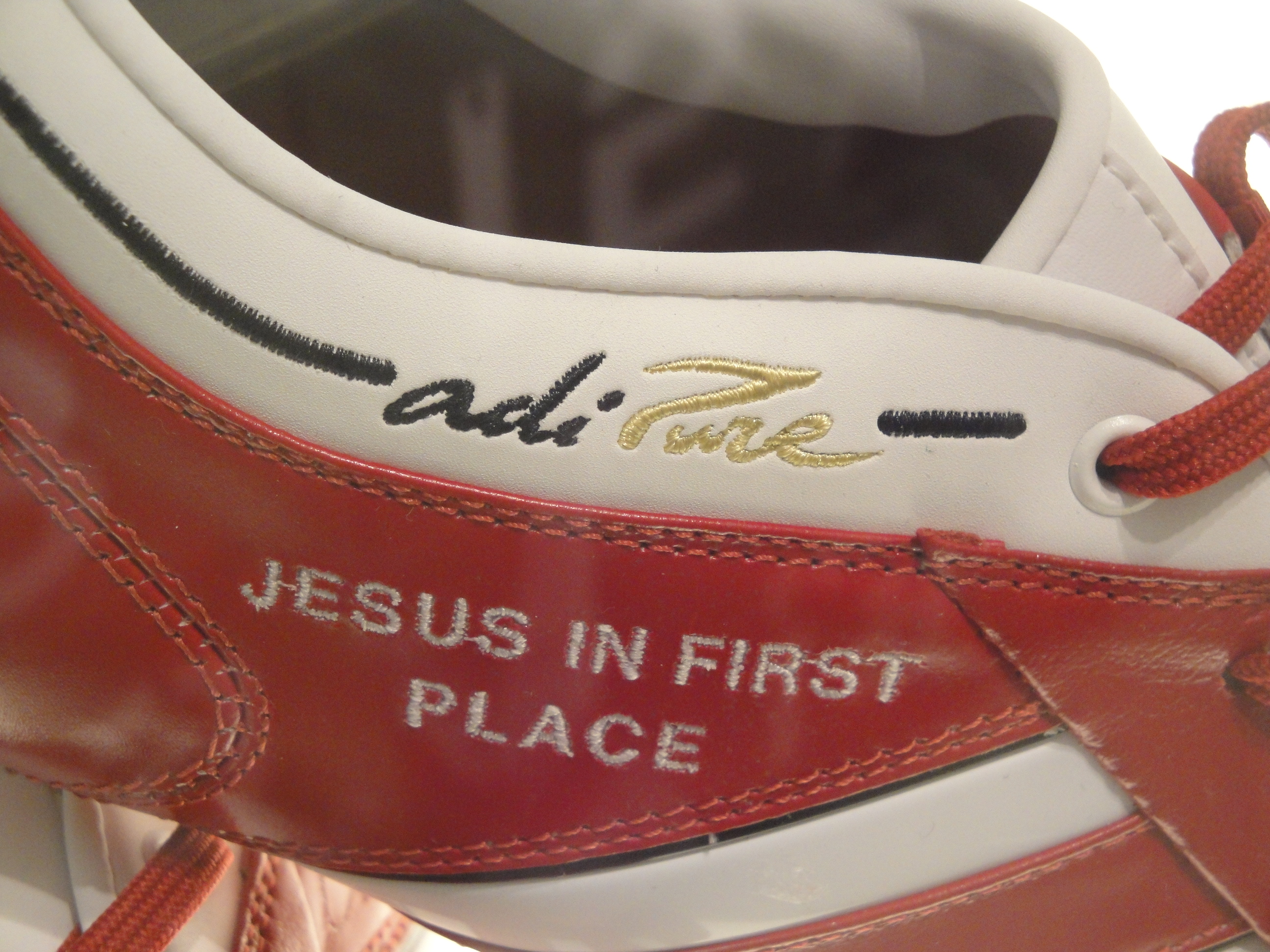
A pair of Kaká's Adidas boots, with a declaration of his Christian faith. In his goal celebrations Kaká invariably points towards the skies to express gratitude to God.

Kaká became an evangelical Christian at the age of 12: "I learnt that it is faith that decides whether something will happen or not." He removed his jersey to reveal an "I Belong to Jesus" T-shirt and openly engaged in prayers after Brazil's 2002 World Cup triumph, as well as Milan's 2004 Scudetto and Milan's 2007 Champions League triumphs. He also had the same phrase, along with "God Is Faithful", stitched onto the tongues of his boots. During the celebration after Brazil's 4–1 win over Argentina in the 2005 Confederations Cup final, he and several of his teammates wore T-shirts that read "Jesus Loves You" in various languages. While receiving the FIFA World Footballer of the Year award in 2007, he said that initially, he just wanted to be a professional player for São Paulo and play one game for the Brazil national team, but that "God gave [him] more than he ever asked for." His goal celebration is him pointing to the sky as a tribute to God. Kaká's favourite music genre is gospel and his favourite book is the Bible. In a 2006 interview with the Brazilian newspaper O Globo, Kaká announced that he wanted to become an evangelical pastor.

He was a member of Igreja Renascer em Cristo until 2010, then became a member of another church whose name has not been disclosed for reasons of confidentiality.

Since November 2004, Kaká has served as an Ambassador Against Hunger for the United Nations' World Food Programme, and he was youngest to do so in 2004. In August 2015, Kaká announced he would attend Full Sail University in Winter Park, Florida and major in Sports Marketing. Kaká was one of several Brazilian footballers to support Jair Bolsonaro in the 2018 Brazilian presidential election.

== Career statistics ==
=== Club ===
Appearances and goals by club, season and competition
Club	Season	League			National cup (Note: Includes Copa do Brasil, Coppa Italia, Copa del Rey, U.S. Open Cup)		Continental		Other		Total	
Club	Season	Division	Apps	Goals	Apps	Goals	Apps	Goals	Apps	Goals	Apps	Goals
São Paulo	2001	Série A	27	12	7	1	5 (Note: Appearances in Copa Mercosur)	0	16	4	55	17
São Paulo	2002	Série A	22	9	9	6	—		17	8	48	23
São Paulo	2003	Série A	10	2	5	0	—		7	5	22	7
São Paulo	Total		59	23	21	7	5	0	40	17	125	47
AC Milan	2003–04	Serie A	30	10	4	0	10 (Note: Appearances in UEFA Champions League)	4	1 (Note: Appearance in Intercontinental Cup)	0	45	14
AC Milan	2004–05	Serie A	36	7	1	0	13	2	1 (Note: Appearance in Supercoppa Italiana)	0	51	9
AC Milan	2005–06	Serie A	35	14	2	0	12	5	—		49	19
AC Milan	2006–07	Serie A	31	8	2	0	15	10	—		48	18
AC Milan	2007–08	Serie A	30	15	0	0	8	2	3 (Note: One appearance and one goal in UEFA Super Cup, two appearances and one goal in FIFA Club World Cup)	2	41	19
AC Milan	2008–09	Serie A	31	16	1	0	4 (Note: Appearances in UEFA Cup)	0	—		36	16
AC Milan	Total		193	70	10	0	62	23	5	2	270	95
Real Madrid	2009–10	La Liga	25	8	1	0	7	1	—		33	9
Real Madrid	2010–11	La Liga	14	7	3	0	3	0	—		20	7
Real Madrid	2011–12	La Liga	27	5	4	0	8	3	1 (Note: Appearance in Supercopa de España)	0	40	8
Real Madrid	2012–13	La Liga	19	3	2	1	6	1	—		27	5
Real Madrid	Total		85	23	10	1	24	5	1	0	120	29
AC Milan	2013–14	Serie A	30	7	1	0	6	2	—		37	9
Orlando City SC	2015	MLS	28	9	2	1	—		—		30	10
Orlando City SC	2016	MLS	24	9	0	0	—		—		24	9
Orlando City SC	2017	MLS	23	6	1	0	—		—		24	6
Orlando City SC	Total		75	24	3	1	—		—		78	25
São Paulo (loan)	2014	Série A	19	2	0	0	5 (Note: Appearances in Copa Sudamericana)	1	—		24	3
Career total			461	149	44	9	102	31	46	19	654	208

=== International ===
Appearances and goals by national team and year
National team	Year	Apps	Goals
Brazil	2002	5	1
Brazil	2003	10	5
Brazil	2004	8	3
Brazil	2005	13	3
Brazil	2006	11	5
Brazil	2007	12	5
Brazil	2008	3	1
Brazil	2009	13	3
Brazil	2010	7	1
Brazil	2012	3	2
Brazil	2013	2	0
Brazil	2014	2	0
Brazil	2015	2	0
Brazil	2016	1	0
Total		92	29

Scores and results list Brazil's goal tally first, score column indicates score after each Kaká goal.

List of international goals scored by Kaká
No.	Date	Venue	Opponent	Score	Result	Competition	Ref.
1	7 March 2002	Arena Pantanal, Cuiabá, Brazil	Iceland	3–0	6–1	Friendly	
2	19 July 2003	Miami Orange Bowl, Miami, United States	Colombia	1–0	2–0	2003 CONCACAF Gold Cup	
3	19 July 2003	Miami Orange Bowl, Miami, United States	Colombia	2–0	2–0	2003 CONCACAF Gold Cup	
4	23 July 2003	Miami Orange Bowl, Miami, United States	United States	1–1	2–1	2003 CONCACAF Gold Cup	
5	7 September 2003	Estadio Metropolitano, Barranquilla, Colombia	Colombia	2–1	2–1	2006 FIFA World Cup qualification	
6	19 November 2003	Arena da Baixada, Curitiba, Brazil	Uruguay	1–0	3–3	2006 FIFA World Cup qualification	
7	28 April 2004	Ferenc Puskás Stadium, Budapest, Hungary	Hungary	1–0	4–1	Friendly	
8	9 October 2004	Estadio José Pachencho Romero, Maracaibo, Venezuela	Venezuela	1–0	5–2	2006 FIFA World Cup qualification	
9	9 October 2004	Estadio José Pachencho Romero, Maracaibo, Venezuela	Venezuela	2–0	5–2	2006 FIFA World Cup qualification	
10	27 March 2005	Estádio Serra Dourada, Goiânia, Brazil	Peru	1–0	1–0	2006 FIFA World Cup qualification	
11	29 June 2005	Waldstadion, Frankfurt, Germany	Argentina	2–0	4–1	2005 FIFA Confederations Cup	
12	12 November 2005	Zayed Sports City Stadium, Abu Dhabi, United Arab Emirates	United Arab Emirates	1–0	8–0	Friendly	
13	4 June 2006	Stade de Genève, Lancy, Switzerland	New Zealand	3–0	4–0	Friendly	
14	13 June 2006	Olympiastadion, Berlin, Germany	Croatia	1–0	1–0	2006 FIFA World Cup	
15	3 September 2006	Emirates Stadium, London, England	Argentina	3–0	3–0	Friendly	
16	10 October 2006	Råsunda Stadium, Stockholm, Sweden	Ecuador	2–1	2–1	Friendly	
17	15 November 2006	St. Jakob-Park, Basel, Switzerland	Switzerland	2–0	2–1	Friendly	
18	24 March 2007	Ullevi, Gothenburg, Sweden	Chile	2–0	4–0	Friendly	
19	12 September 2007	Gillette Stadium, Foxborough, United States	Mexico	2–1	3–1	Friendly	
20	17 October 2007	Maracanã Stadium, Rio de Janeiro, Brazil	Ecuador	3–0	5–0	2010 FIFA World Cup qualification	
21	17 October 2007	Maracanã Stadium, Rio de Janeiro, Brazil	Ecuador	5–0	5–0	2010 FIFA World Cup qualification	
22	18 November 2007	Estadio Monumental, Lima, Peru	Peru	1–0	1–1	2010 FIFA World Cup qualification	
23	12 October 2008	Estadio Polideportivo de Pueblo Nuevo, San Cristóbal, Venezuela	Venezuela	1–0	4–0	2010 FIFA World Cup qualification	
24	6 June 2009	Estadio Centenario, Montevideo, Uruguay	Uruguay	4–0	4–0	2010 FIFA World Cup qualification	
25	15 June 2009	Free State Stadium, Bloemfontein, SOuth Africa	Egypt	1–0	4–3	2009 FIFA Confederations Cup	
26	15 June 2009	Free State Stadium, Bloemfontein, SOuth Africa	Egypt	4–3	4–3	2009 FIFA Confederations Cup	
27	7 June 2010	Benjamin Mkapa Stadium, Dar es Salaam, Tanzania	Tanzania	4–0	5–1	Friendly	
28	11 October 2012	Swedbank Stadion, Malmö, Sweden	Iraq	3–0	6–0	Friendly	
29	16 October 2012	Wrocław Stadium, Wrocław, Poland	Japan	4–0	4–0	Friendly	

== Honours ==
São Paulo

- Supercampeonato Paulista: 2002
- Torneio Rio – São Paulo: 2001

AC Milan

- Serie A: 2003–04
- Supercoppa Italiana: 2004
- UEFA Champions League: 2006–07
- UEFA Super Cup: 2007
- FIFA Club World Cup: 2007

Real Madrid

- La Liga: 2011–12
- Copa del Rey: 2010–11

Brazil

- FIFA World Cup: 2002
- FIFA Confederations Cup: 2005, 2009

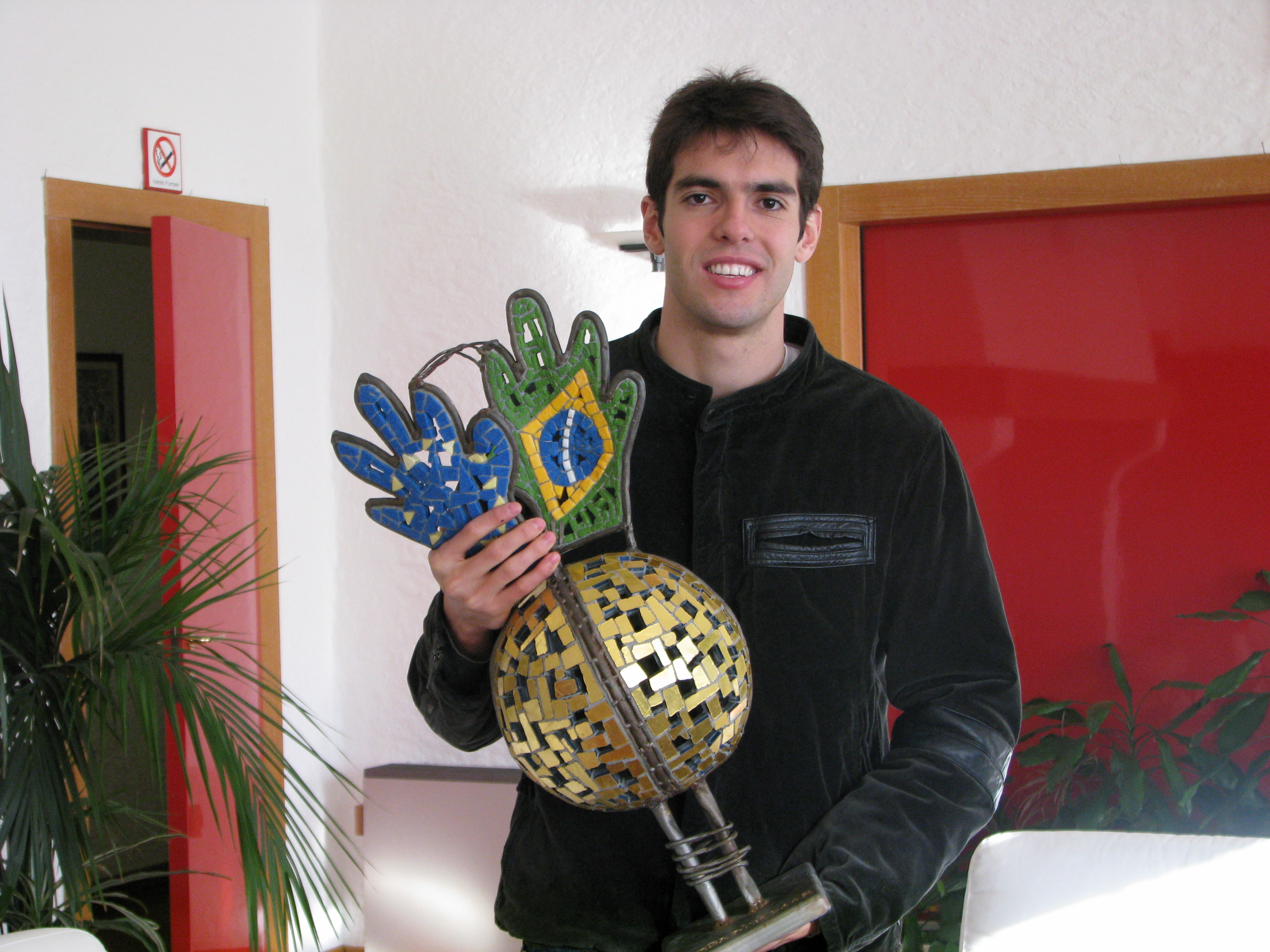
Kaká holding the 2008 Samba Gold

Individual

- Ballon d'Or: 2007
- FIFA World Player of the Year: 2007
- FIFPro World Player of the Year: 2007
- FIFPro World XI: 2006, 2007, 2008
- UEFA Team of the Year: 2006, 2007, 2009
- UEFA Club Forward of the Year: 2006–07
- UEFA Club Footballer of the Year: 2006–07
- UEFA Club Midfielder of the Year: 2004–05
- UEFA Champions League Bronze Foot: 2005–06
- Pallone d'Argento: 2006–07
- UEFA Champions League Squad of the Season: 2004–05,2005–06,2006–07
- World Soccer Player of the Year: 2007
- Serie A Foreign Footballer of the Year: 2004, 2006, 2007
- Serie A Footballer of the Year: 2004, 2007
- Bola de Ouro: 2002
- Bola de Prata: 2002
- South American Team of the Year: 2002
- CONCACAF Gold Cup Best XI: 2003
- IFFHS World's Best Playmaker: 2007
- IAAF Latin Sportsman of the Year: 2007
- Onze d'Or: 2007
- FIFA Club World Cup Golden Ball: 2007
- Time 100: 2008, 2009
- Maracanã Hall of Fame: 2008
- Samba Gold: 2008
- MARCA Legend Award: 2009
- FIFA Confederations Cup Golden Ball: 2009
- FIFA Confederations Cup Best XI: 2009
- AC Milan Hall of Fame: 2026
- MLS All-Star: 2015, 2016, 2017
- MLS All-Star Game MVP: 2015
- UEFA Ultimate Team of the Year: 2015 (substitute)
