= Russian Cup =

Russian Cup may refer to:

- Cup of Russia in artistic gymnastics
- Russian Cup (bandy)
- Russian Cup (football)
- Russian Cup (rugby league)
- Russian Cup (tennis)

== See also ==
- Rostelecom Cup (figure skating; formerly called the Cup of Russia)
- Russian Open Championship (ice hockey; formerly included the Cup of Russia League)
- Russian Championship (disambiguation)
- Russian Basketball Cup
- Russian Super Cup (football)
- Russian Railways Cup (football)
- Russian Premier League Cup (football)
