= Digão (footballer, born 1985) =

Brazilian footballer

Personal information
- Full name: Rodrigo Izecson dos Santos Leite
- Date of birth: 14 October 1985 (age 41)
- Place of birth: Brasília, Brazil
- Height: 1.94 m (6 ft 4 in)
- Position: Centre back

Youth career
- 2003–2004: São Paulo
- 2004–2005: Sampdoria
- 2004–2005: → Milan (loan)

Senior career*
Years	Team	Apps	(Gls)
2005–2011	Milan	1	(0)
2005–2007	→ Rimini (loan)	23	(0)
2008–2009	→ Standard Liège (loan)	1	(0)
2009–2010	→ Lecce (loan)	2	(0)
2010	→ Crotone (loan)	0	(0)
2010–2011	→ Penafiel (loan)	11	(0)
2012–2013	New York Red Bulls	0	(0)
Total		38	(0)
- * Club domestic league appearances and goals as of 1 July 2011

Rodrigo Manuel Izecson dos Santos Leite (born 14 October 1985), known as Digão (Brazilian Portuguese pronunciation: [dʒiˈɡɐ̃w]), is a Brazilian retired professional footballer who played as a central defender.

After signing with A.C. Milan at the age of 19, he spent several years on loans with various teams, mainly in Italy.

== Club career ==
Born in Brasília, Digão joined A.C. Milan from São Paulo FC in 2004, loaned by another club in Italy, U.C. Sampdoria, until June of the following year. He went on to spend the following two seasons on loan to Rimini Calcio, where he started appearing as a senior.

Returning to Milan in the summer of 2007, Digão made his debut in a friendly match against FC Dynamo Kyiv on 6 September, in which he received a yellow card. His first competitive appearance came on 20 December in the 1–2 home defeat to Calcio Catania, for the first leg of the Coppa Italia's round-of-16; he eventually made his Serie A debut on 1 March 2008 in a 1–1 home draw against S.S. Lazio, coming on as a half-time substitute for Marek Jankulovski in his only appearance of the season.

On 13 August 2008, Belgium's Standard Liège secured Digão's services on a one-year loan. He only appeared in a single Pro League match during his spell, playing the last minutes of the 3–1 home win over K.F.C. Germinal Beerschot on 5 April 2009, and returned to Milan at the end of the campaign.

On 11 July 2009, Digão was handed a one-week trial with newly promoted Bundesliga club SC Freiburg, joining the team in the pre-season training camp in Schruns, Austria and playing 30 minutes in a friendly with Slavia Prague. On 22 July, however, the Germans decided not to sign the player.

On 31 August 2009, Digão joined U.S. Lecce from Serie B on a season-long loan. However, on 1 February 2010, he was called back due to lack of playing time, and subsequently sent on another loan spell to F.C. Crotone, until June.

In 2010–11 another loan ensued, with Digão moving to F.C. Penafiel in the Portuguese second division. He left after appearing in only one third of the league's matches, and was also released by Milan.

In September 2012, it was reported that Digão was training with the New York Red Bulls of Major League Soccer. After a week-long trial, he impressed head coach Hans Backe with his physical prowess and ability to play technically out of the backline, and earned a contract; however, on 19 July 2013, he cancelled his link by mutual agreement.

== International career ==
In 2008, according to newspaper O Globo, Digão, still uncapped for the national team at any level, was one of 74 players who could be called up by manager Dunga for his preliminary 2008 Summer Olympics squad. He eventually did not make the final list.

== Personal life ==
Digão is the younger brother of Brazilian footballer Kaká. An attacking midfielder, he also played for São Paulo and Milan, also spending several seasons in Spain with Real Madrid. A Brazilian international on nearly 90 occasions, he helped the national team win the 2002 FIFA World Cup.

Digão was responsible for his sibling's nickname: being unable to pronounce 'Ricardo' properly as a child, he used to call his brother 'Kaká' instead.

Eduardo Delani, a footballer who played for several teams, is their double-first cousin. His father is the brother of their father, and his mother the sister of their mother.
