= Kingsley Umunegbu =

Nigerian footballer

Kingsley Ebete Umunegbu
Personal information
- Full name: Kingsley Ebete Umunegbu
- Date of birth: 28 October 1989 (age 37)
- Place of birth: Zaria, Nigeria
- Height: 1.78 m (5 ft 10 in)
- Position: Forward

Team information
- Current team: Ospedaletto Euganeo

Youth career
- US Arcella
- Milan

Senior career*
Years	Team	Apps	(Gls)
2007–2011	Milan	0	(0)
2008–2009	→ Salernitana (loan)	2	(0)
2009	→ Portogruaro (loan)	6	(0)
2009–2010	→ Varese (loan)	0	(0)
2010–2011	→ Renate (loan)	13	(0)
2011–2012	Chiasso		
2012	→ Milan (loan)	0	(0)
2012	Bologna	0	(0)
2012–2013	Boussu	25	(2)
2016–2017	Tavşanlı Linyitspor	18	(2)
2017–2018	US Arcella	16	(2)
2018–2019	Thermal Teolo	24	(4)
2019	Sarcedo Calcio	10	(2)
2019–2021	ACD Villafranchese		
2021–	Ospedaletto Euganeo		
- * Club domestic league appearances and goals as of 17:02, 1 May 2020 (UTC)

Kingsley Ebete Umunegbu (born 28 October 1989) is a Nigerian professional footballer who plays as a striker for Ospedaletto Euganeo Calcio.

== Career ==
After playing in their youth team, Umunegbu made his official debut for Milan in a Coppa Italia game against Catania on 20 December 2007, coming off the bench at half time.

For the 2008–09 season he was loaned out to Serie B club Salernitana. He left the club after only six months, due to lack of playing time, and was subsequently loaned to Prima Divisione side Portogruaro. The following season, he was sent on loan to Varese, but finished the season with no league appearances. At the start of the 2010–11 season he was loaned out again, this time to Seconda Divisione club Renate.

At the beginning of the 2011–12 season, Umunegbu signed for Chiasso on a free transfer, but during the January transfer window he came back to Milan as they needed a player to fill in their second non-EU spot, which otherwise would have been lost.

On 26 July 2012, Umunegbu signed for Bologna on a free transfer. However the deal also cost Bologna €175,000. Umunegbu immediately transferred to Belgian club Boussu for free.

After a spell in Turkey, Umunegbu returned to Italy and re-joined US Arcella in the Italian Promozione, the club he played for as a child. He then moved to Thermal Abano Teolo in the Prima Categoria for the 2018-19 season. In the summer 2019 he joined Sarcedo Calcio. However, he left the club again a few months later due to the long distance between his home in Padua and Sarcedo. In December 2019, he then joined Promozione club ACD Villafranchese.

For the 2021-22 season, Umunegbu joined Italian Prima Categoria club Ospedaletto Euganeo Calcio.
