= Russian Championship =

Russian Championship may refer to:

- Russian American Football Championship, the highest level of American football played in Russia
- Russian Artistic Gymnastics Championships, an annual Russian national artistic gymnastics competition
- Russian National Badminton Championships, a tournament organized to crown the best badminton players in Russia
- List of Russian bandy champions, a list of the winners of the final of the highest Russian bandy league played each year
- Russian Professional Basketball Championship
- Russian Chess Championship, a list of chess champions since before 1899
- Russian Curling Championships, a list of winners of the national curling championships since 1993
- Russian Figure Skating Championships, held annually to determine the national champions of Russia
- Russian Junior Figure Skating Championships, a list of the country's junior-level national champions
- Russian Football Championship, another name for the Russian Premier League, the top division professional association football league in Russia
- Russian Women's Football Championship, the highest professional women's football league in Russia
- Russian Formula 1600 Championship
- Russian Formula Three Championship
- Russian Women's Futsal Super League
- Russian Open golf championship, a tournament on the European Tour
- List of Soviet and Russian ice hockey champions, the organizations winning the Russian Open Hockey Championship ward and national title
- Russian National Road Race Championships
- Russian Rhythmic Gymnastics Championships, an annual national competition
- Russian Championship (rugby league), the major rugby league tournament for clubs in Russia
- Russian Individual Speedway Championship, a Motorcycle speedway championship held each year to determine the national champion
- Russian National Time Trial Championships, a cycling race held annually
- Russian Women's Water Polo Championship
- Russian Water Polo Championship

== See also ==
- Russian Cup (disambiguation)
