= Russian Cup (rugby league) =

Annual rugby league competition

The Russian Cup (Кубок России) is a rugby league competition held annually by the Russian Rugby League Federation for professional, semi-professional and amateur clubs in Russia. All clubs from the Russian Championship competition compete in the Russian Cup, along with amateur clubs from around Russia and its various districts.

== See also ==
- Rugby league in Russia
