= Alessandro Ruggeri =

Italian footballer (born 1990)

Personal information
- Date of birth: November 16, 1990 (age 35)
- Place of birth: Cantù, Italy
- Height: 1.78 m (5 ft 10 in)
- Position: Defender

Youth career
- Milan

Senior career*
Years	Team	Apps	(Gls)
2009–2011	San Marino	28	(2)
2011–2012	Reggina	0	(0)
2012	→ Piacenza (loan)	8	(0)
2012–2014	Cuneo	15	(1)

International career
2007	Italy U-17	1	(0)
- * Club domestic league appearances and goals as of 30 June 2014

Alessandro Ruggeri (born November 16, 1990) is an Italian professional football player who last played for Cuneo.
