= European record =

A European record may refer to:

== Sports ==
- List of European records in athletics
- List of European Athletics Championships records
- List of European records in swimming
- List of European Championships records in swimming
- European Cup and Euroleague records and statistics (basketball)

=== Football ===
- European football records
- European association football club records and statistics
- European Cup and Champions League records and statistics
- England's European Under-21 Football Championship Record

== Other ==
- European Institute for Health Records
