= Russian Railways Cup =

- Founded: 2007
- Abolished: 2008
- Region: Europe (UEFA)
- Teams: 4
- Last champions: (Spain) Sevilla (1st title)
- Most championships: (Netherlands) PSV Eindhoven (Spain) Sevilla (1 title)

Russian Railways Cup (Russian: Кубок РЖД) was an annual pre-season football tournament, held in Moscow and hosted by FC Lokomotiv Moscow.

The first edition of the tournament took place in 2007. Dutch club PSV Eindhoven won the title after beating Real Madrid 2–1 in the final. PSV Eindhoven beat Italian team Milan 4–3 on penalties after a goalless draw, in the first semi-final, while Real Madrid managed to come back from two goals down after the first half to beat the hosts Lokomotiv Moscow 5–2. In the third place playoff, Milan scored twice in the last ten minutes to draw with Lokomotiv Moscow 3–3. The Italians went on to claim the third place after beating the Russian club 5–4 on penalties.

== Results ==
Year	Final			Third Place Match		
Year	Winners	Score	Runners-up	Third place	Score	Fourth place
2007	(Netherlands) PSV Eindhoven	2–1	(Spain) Real Madrid	(Italy) Milan	3–3 aet (5–4) ps	(Russia) Lokomotiv Moscow
2008	(Spain) Sevilla	3–0	(Russia) Lokomotiv Moscow	(England) Chelsea	5–0	(Italy) Milan

- Key:
  - aet — after extra time
  - ps — penalty shootout

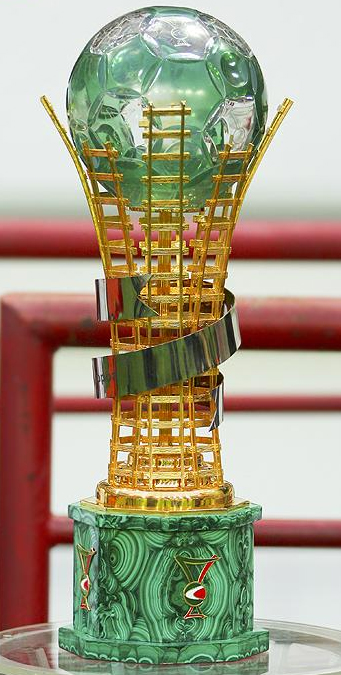
Russian Railways Cup trophy.

== See also ==
- Amsterdam Tournament
- Emirates Cup
- Peace Cup
- Barclays Asia Trophy
