= AC Milan in international football =

Italian club in international football

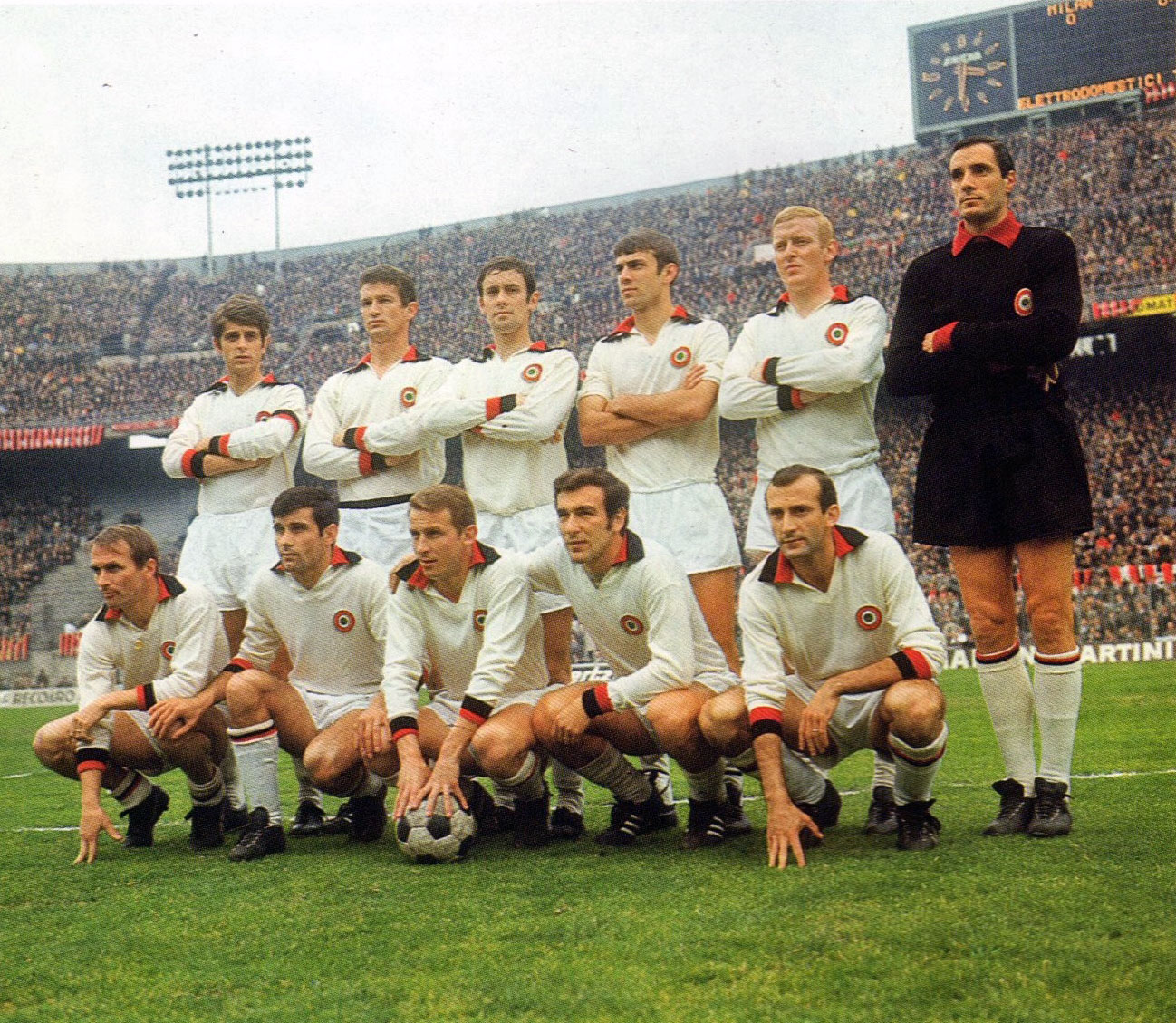
- A Milan formation during the 1967–68 season, when they won their first Cup Winners' Cup.
- Club: AC Milan
- Seasons played: 52
- Most appearances: Paolo Maldini (176)
- Top scorer: Filippo Inzaghi (43)
- First entry: 1938 Mitropa Cup - 1955–56 European Cup
- Latest entry: 2026–27 UEFA Europa League

Titles
- Champions League: 7: 1963; 1969; 1989; 1990; 1994; 2003; 2007
- Cup Winners' Cup: 2: 1968; 1973
- Super Cup: 5: 1989; 1990; 1994; 2003; 2007
- Intercontinental Cup: 3: 1969; 1989; 1990
- FIFA Club World Cup: 1: 2007

Associazione Calcio Milan is an Italian football club based in Milan, Lombardy. The club was founded on December 16, 1899 as Milan Foot-Ball and Cricket Club, with the goal of promoting football and cricket in Milan. The club has competed in the Italian football league system since 1900. They were the first Italian club to qualify for the European Cup in 1955. Since then, the club has competed in every UEFA-organised competition, with the exception of the Intertoto Cup and the Conference League.

The competition in which the club has had the most success is the European Cup/UEFA Champions League, which they won seven times, the first in 1963; this win made them the first Italian side to win the European Cup. The other six victories came in 1969, 1989, 1990, 1994, 2003 and 2007. The club has also won the Cup Winners' Cup twice, in 1968 and 1973; the Super Cup five times, in 1989, 1990, 1994, 2003 and 2007; and the Intercontinental Cup three times, in 1969, 1989 and 1990.

After their Champions League win in 2007, Milan also competed as UEFA's representatives at the 2007 FIFA Club World Cup, eventually winning the competition and thus becoming the first Italian and European side to win the trophy. They have also won the 1951 and 1956 Latin Cup and the 1982 Mitropa Cup.

== History ==
=== 1938–1961: European debut and first successes ===
The club's debut in European competitions occurred in the first round of the 1938 Mitropa Cup, when they lost 3–0 to FC Ripensia Timișoara. The following home win by 3–1 was not enough to reach the quarter finals. The early 1950s marked the resurgence of Milan in both Italian (where they won their first scudetto in 44 years) and European soil, mainly thanks to the so-called Gre-No-Li, a trio of attacking players formed by Swedish footballers Gunnar Gren, Gunnar Nordahl and Nils Liedholm. The first appearance in a continental match in this new era took place in the 1951 semifinal match of the Latin Cup, where Milan defeated Atlético Madrid with a 4–1 score which allowed them to reach the final against Lille, won with a 5–0 score. This first European achievement was repeated five years later thanks to the victory in the 1956 Latin Cup final against Athletic Bilbao (3–1). Milan holds the record of most Latin Cup wins, with two (record shared with Real Madrid and Barcelona).

Milan first competed in the European cup in the 1955–56 season. The club's first match in European cup was a round-of-16 tie against Saarbrücken; Milan lost the home match 3–4. The return leg was played at the Ludwigspark Stadion in Saarbrücken, and the match finished as a 4–1 win for Milan, which allowed them to qualify for the next round. After eliminating Rapid Wien in the quarter-finals, Milan faced Real Madrid in the semi-finals. The first leg took Milan to the Santiago Bernabéu Stadium, where they were defeated 4–2. Despite winning 2–1 in the second leg back at San Siro, they were eliminated from the competition.

The 1957–58 European Cup campaign saw Milan defeating Rapid Wien in the preliminary round, where a play-off was needed to determine the winner, Rangers in the first round, Borussia Dortmund in the quarter-finals and Manchester United in the semi-finals, eliminating the latter thanks to a convincing 4–0 win at San Siro. Milan met Real Madrid in the final at the Heysel Stadium in Brussels. Real Madrid were the favorites and came from two wins in the previous editions of the trophy, but Milan proved to be a tough opponent and the game was memorable. Milan led 1–0 and then 2–1 but were reached by Héctor Rial scoring the 2–2. The game went to the extra time and in the end Real Madrid prevailed with a final score of 3–2.

The late 1950s and early 1960s were also to be remembered for Milan's participation in the Coppa dell'Amicizia, an unrecognized competition, and in the Inter-Cities Fairs Cup, the predecessor to the UEFA Cup. The Coppa dell'Amicizia was a friendly competition between Italy and France, where clubs of each country faced each other in a two-legged tie format. The Italian representatives, included Milan, won the trophy in 1959, 1960 and 1961. In the Inter-Cities Fairs Cup Milan did not achieve remarkable results.

=== 1961–1974: Nereo Rocco's European and worldwide triumphs ===
In 1960, Milan secured a young talent from Alessandria, his name is Gianni Rivera. He immediately impressed the San Siro audience with his pure technique and went on to be the pillar of Milan's successes for two decades. One year later, Nereo Rocco was hired as manager of the club, bringing to Milan his experience on the Catenaccio approach, which he integrated with a good attacking phase, thanks also to new signings such as Dino Sani, José Altafini and Amarildo. Milan's Serie A title in 1961-62 granted them access to the European Cup the following season. Milan eliminated Union Luxembourg, Ipswich Town, Galatasaray and Dundee to reach the final with Benfica in Wembley, London. Thanks to a brace of José Altafini, the top-scorer of the tournament with 14 goals, Milan won the game 2–1 and lifted their first European Cup, first Italian club to achieve this result. This success allowed Milan to play the Intercontinental Cup against Santos. The first leg was played at the San Siro in Milan, on 16 October 1963. Milan won the home game 4–2. The return leg was held the following month, on 14 November, at the Maracanã in Rio de Janeiro. As Santos won the match 4–2, the two teams were level on points and a playoff had to be contested two days later. Santos won 1–0, thus securing the trophy. The final was remembered for suspected corruption attempts by Santos officials towards the referee of the return leg, Juan Brozzi, who handled the game in evident favour of the Brazilians, not punishing their excessive aggressiveness on the pitch, thus allowing them to overcome the 2–0 lead Milan had at the end of the half time. Moreover, the same referee was chosen for the play-off game, where he whistled the contested penalty that gave Santos the victory. In the aftermath, the referee was then sacked by the Argentine Football Association.

In the 1963–64 season, Milan was eliminated from the European Cup by Real Madrid in the quarter-finals. The following European appearance was in the 1967–68 European Cup Winners' Cup. Milan reached the final undefeated, where they met Hamburg, beaten 2–0. In 1968-69 Milan took part in the European Cup. They met primary opponents of the time, such as Celtic in the quarter-finals, and Manchester United in the semi-finals. Both teams were eliminated and in the final Milan faced a young Ajax team that few years later would go on to dominate international football. The match displayed remarkable performances by Pierino Prati, who scored a hat-trick, and Gianni Rivera, who dominated the midfield and gifted Prati with three assists. Hence, Milan faced Estudiantes in the Intercontinental Cup final. The tie became infamous for the violent on-pitch conduct and dirty tactics employed by Estudiantes' players in the second leg of the fixture. Milan won the first leg in San Siro with a 3–0 score. In the return leg, Estudiantes' 2–1 win was not enough, and Milan achieved their first Intercontinental Cup win.

The 1969-70 European Cup campaign was unsuccessful, and Milan was eliminated by Feyenoord in the second round. In 1971–72, Milan participated in the UEFA Cup for the first time and went on to reach the semi-finals, where they were eliminated by Tottenham Hotspur. Thanks to the Coppa Italia win in the same season, in 1972-73 Milan played in the Cup Winners' Cup for their second time. The path of the rossoneri to the final was steady and regular, with no defeats, and in the final act they met Leeds United. A goal from Luciano Chiarugi gave Milan the lead after just 4 minutes from the beginning of the match. The rest of the game was approached difensively by the club, and thanks to a remarkable performance of goalkeeper William Vecchi, Milan was able to retain the 1–0 lead until the end, securing the trophy. Milan took part to another Cup Winners' Cup the following season, reaching again the final, but being defeated by Magdeburg.

=== 1974–1995: Decline and resurgence to European dominance under Berlusconi's ownership ===
The years that followed brought few results in European competitions. The best one was a quarter final in the 1975–76 UEFA Cup, with Milan being eliminated by Club Brugge. The European cup participation in 1979–80, thanks to the victory of the tenth scudetto in the previous season, ended prematurely, in the first round, due to a 1–0 home defeat to Porto. In the same season, Milan was involved in the Totonero scandal and was punished with the relegation to the second division. Milan had no troubles getting promoted to Serie A the following year, when they also won the Mitropa Cup, a trophy participated by the winners of European second division championships. However, in Serie A things were not progressing well, and the final third last place condemned Milan to their second relegation, followed by another promotion in the next season.

Milan struggled financially and on the pitch till the mid-1980s, and was on the brink of bankruptcy when media tycoon Silvio Berlusconi took over the club in February 1986, promising their supporters to bring Milan back to the old glory, both domestically and internationally. The first European campaigns of Berlusconi's Milan brought meager results, being eliminated in the third round of the 1985–86 UEFA Cup by Waregem and in the second round of the 1987–88 UEFA Cup by Espanyol. However, the formation of a revolutionizing team was on its way. A mix of young players such as Roberto Donadoni and affirmed stars as Carlo Ancelotti, Marco Van Basten and Ruud Gullit were added to an already solid base formed by the likes of Paolo Maldini and Franco Baresi. The mind behind this team was Arrigo Sacchi, a young and relatively inexperienced manager but with modern and courageous ideas that contrasted the defensive approach typical of Italian sides of the period. After some months of trial, where some players struggled to assimilate the highly intensive training techniques adopted by Sacchi, the team started to impose its fast-paced and high-pressing play to its opponents. The conquest of the scudetto in the 1987–88 season granted Milan access to the European Cup the following season, when they completed the team with the addition of Frank Rijkaard. After eliminating Levski Sofia in the first round, the next opponent was Red Star Belgrade. The return leg was surrounded by an aura of surrealism. The home team was leading 1-0 when a dense fog fell on the pitch, which lead to the referee suspending the game on the 57th minute. By the regulation of the time, a rematch would have to be played the following day. After an intense fight, which included a heavy injury for Donadoni, Milan won at the penalty shoot-out after the game ended 1–1. Milan went on defeating Werder Bremen in the quarter-finals, and met Real Madrid in the semi-finals. Contrary to the approach of Italian teams of the time, Sacchi's Milan went to Madrid with the intent of winning the game, and they nearly did so, with a dominating performance that granted them a 1–1 score. The return leg was the perfect game of Sacchi's formation, which outshined the opponents with a 5–0 victory. The final against Steaua București was won 4–0 with two braces of Gullit and Van Basten at the Camp Nou in Barcelona. Subsequently, Milan won the 1989 European Super Cup against Barcelona in a two-legged tie which saw the rossoneri drawing 1–1 in Spain and winning 1–0 at home. In the 1989 Intercontinental Cup the opponent was Atlético Nacional. The Colombians blocked successfully the Milan players and the game was resolved only at the 119th minute, in the extra time, with a free kick by Alberico Evani, which set the final score to 1–0 for the rossoneri.

The following season, Milan replicated the same three European achievements proving to be the best team of their time. In fact, they won another European Cup beating Benfica 1–0 and eliminating Real Madrid and Bayern Munich on the way to the final; they conquered the 1990 European Super Cup with a two-legged tie win against Sampdoria; finally, they beat Club Olimpia 3–0 in the 1990 Intercontinental Cup. After almost three years at high playing and training pace, the team suffered some fatigue in the 1990–91 season, when they could not repeat the European exploits of the previous spells. In the European Cup they were eliminated in the quarter finals by Marseille in odd circumstances. After a 1–1 in the first leg in San Siro, the French were in the lead 1–0 in the return leg when, at the 87th minute, the game was suspended as Milan refused to continue playing when some floodlights went off. In the aftermath, UEFA decided to punish such behavior by giving Marseille a 3–0 win and banning Milan from European competitions for the 1991–92 season.

Milan returned to the Champions League in 1992–93, with Fabio Capello as the new manager, who, in the previous season, had replaced Sacchi. With most of Sacchi's players still part of the team, the club reached the final winning every game and conceding only one goal. Marseille was the opponent and once again Milan had to surrender to them, losing the match 1–0. However, soon after Marseille's victory, allegations of match fixing were directed at them and their president Bernard Tapie. This involved a league game that took place six days before the final, where Marseille, it emerged, had fixed their title-clinching Division 1 game against Valenciennes so they could concentrate on the final against Milan. It is believed that Tapie bribed Valenciennes to lose so that Marseille would win the French league earlier, and above all that they would not injure the Marseille players before the final against Milan. The French club were banned from defending their European title in the 1993–94 season, and contesting the Super Cup and the Intercontinental Cup. Milan was therefore granted the right to compete in the latter two competitions. However, they lost both the Super Cup, against Parma, and the Intercontinental Cup, against São Paulo.

In 1993–94, the rossoneri tried the assault to the Champions League once again, and this time they were successful. They reached the final unbeaten, conceding only two goals in the whole competitions (a European Cup/Champions League record shared with Aston Villa). In the final, Milan defeated Barcelona with a clear 4–0 score. In the 1994–95 season they won the Super Cup thanks to a 0–0 draw at Highbury and a 2–0 win at San Siro, while the Intercontinental Cup proved again unsuccessful for Milan, which lost 2–0 against Vélez Sársfield. In the Champions League, Milan reached the final for the third consecutive year (a record shared with Real Madrid and Juventus), but lost 1–0 to Ajax thanks to a late goal of Patrick Kluivert. This final marked the end of an era of international dominance of the club, which lasted almost uninterruptedly from 1988 to 1995.

=== 1995–2012: Ancelotti's triumphs at the dawn of the century ===
From the 1996–97 to 2000–01 seasons, Milan experienced a transition period, where many of the players that built the rossoneri's fortunes either left the club (Gullit, Donadoni and manager Fabio Capello) or retired (Baresi, Tassotti). A solid group of players still in their prime (Maldini, Costacurta, Boban) remained, thus securing a continuation of the legacy. However, with only one scudetto won in this time frame, the team needed some strengthening. It is between the summer transfer sessions of 1999 and 2001 that the club's management decided to make the most important investments to rebuild a winning team. Young and affirmed players joined Milan, such as Andriy Shevchenko, Gennaro Gattuso, Manuel Rui Costa, Filippo Inzaghi, Nelson Dida and Andrea Pirlo. In the first half of the 2001–02 season, after a series of unconvincing results, then coach Fatih Terim was sacked and replaced, after a small intermezzo of former Milan captain Cesare Maldini, by Carlo Ancelotti. In the same season, the club reached the semi-finals of the UEFA Cup, and got eliminated by Borussia Dortmund after a 4–0 loss in Germany and a 3–1 win at San Siro. In summer 2002 the team was strengthened further, with the arrival of Clarence Seedorf and Alessandro Nesta.

Milan participated in the 2002–03 Champions League having to start from the qualifying round, where they eliminated Slovan Liberec. In both the group stages, despite having to face good opponents such as Real Madrid and Bayern Munich, the club managed to achieve arithmetic qualification as first in the group after playing the first four matches of each group, and they lost only the four games which were not relevant for the final ranking. The team demonstrated a very solid mentality in addition to a pleasant play. In the quarter-finals, they met Ajax. After a 0–0 draw in the first leg in Amsterdam, the return match was thrilling. Milan gained the lead twice, but they were caught both times by the Dutch. On the 93rd minute, Inzaghi was the fastest to get to a wandering ball in the box, and with a quick move lobbed the goalkeeper; Jon Dahl Tomasson placed the ball into the net. In the semi-finals, Milan met their city rivals of Inter in a much anticipated game. The first leg was paralyzed by nerves and tension and ended with a 0–0 draw. The return leg was more openly played and the final score of 1–1 benefited Milan who went on to the final thanks to the rule of away goals. In the final, played at the Old Trafford, Milan met another Italian team, Juventus. The game ended with a goalless draw and the penalty kicks were necessary to determine the winner. Thanks to a great performance of goalkeeper Dida, who saved three penalties, and to Andriy Shevchenko, who scored the decisive one, Milan achieved their sixth Champions League title.

In the 2003–04 season, Milan was therefore granted the right to play in the UEFA Super Cup and in the Intercontinental Cup. In the UEFA Super Cup Milan faced UEFA Cup winners Porto and defeated them 1–0 thanks to a winning header of Shevchenko, assisted by Rui Costa. In the Intercontinental Cup, Milan didn't go beyond a 1–1 against South American champions Boca Juniors. The penalty shoot-outs were required again to determine the winner, but this time it was the turn of Milan opponents to clench the trophy. With the arrival of Kaká in summer 2003, Milan attack acquired even more explosivity, and the team seemed to have everything in place to reach another final. However, after a comfortable 4–1 win at San Siro, Milan was eliminated by Deportivo la Coruña in the second leg of the quarter-finals after a startling 4–0 defeat.

The 2004–05 season saw the addition of Jaap Stam and Hernán Crespo to further invigorate a team that entered the Champions League amongst the favorites. Milan qualified first in the group stage above Barcelona, beaten 1–0 at San Siro. In the round of 16, they eliminated Manchester United with a double 1–0 win, and in the quarter-finals Milan faced once again their city rivals of Inter. In the first leg, two headers from Stam and Shevchenko granted Milan the win. In the return leg, Milan was leading 1–0 thanks to a long-distance shot of the Ukrainian, when a disallowed Inter goal caused massive protests from the nerazzurri supporters, who started throwing flares on the pitch. One of them hit Milan goalkeeper Dida, who had to abandon the pitch, with the referee suspending the game. After a while, the game was restarted, but again flares fell on the pitch, to which the referee reacted by definitely suspending the game. Afterwards, Milan was awarded a 3–0 win which secured them a place in the semi-finals. There they met the revelation of the tournament, PSV Eindhoven. The Dutch proved to be a tough opponent, and Milan got the better of them only thanks to the rule of away goals, with a 91st-minute goal by Massimo Ambrosini in the return leg at the Philips Stadion. The final against Liverpool was one of the best football matches in the history of the sport. Milan gained the lead within the first minute with a goal from its captain Paolo Maldini. Milan went on to score two more goals before the half time whistle. In the second half, within six minutes, Liverpool scored three goals, thus levelling the score. Despite this big psychological set-back, Milan kept attacking and creating chances, but without scoring. The game went to the extra time. Shevchenko missed an incredible double chance, when both a header and the subsequent shot on the keeper's rebound were saved by Jerzy Dudek. At the penalty shoot-outs, three mistakes on Milan side gave the title to Liverpool.

The 2005–06 Champions League started well once again for Milan, who qualified as first team in the group stage, and in the round of 16 eliminated Bayern Munich with a 5–2 aggregate score. The quarter-finals against Olympique Lyonnais were more tight: after a 0–0 in France, Milan gained the lead only at the 88th minute to end the game with a 3–1 lead. However, the path of the rossoneri terminated in the semi-finals against Barcelona, condemned by a 1–0 defeat at San Siro and despite a contested disallowed goal from Shevchenko in the return leg, ended 0–0.

The 2006–07 Champions League campaign started from the qualifying round, with Milan beating Red Star Belgrade both home and away. After going through the group stage, the opponent in the round of 16 was Celtic. The game in Glasgow ended with a goalless draw. In Milan, the game was resolved in the rossoneri's favor only in the extra time, thanks to a trademark progression run by Kakà, who started from the midfield line and ended up with the Scottish keeper beaten inside the box. The quarter-finals against Bayern Munich displayed the pure talent of Clarence Seedorf, who, in the return leg in Germany, scored the opening goal with a precise shot from just inside the box and served a backheel assist to Inzaghi for the final 2–0 score. Manchester United was the adversary in the semi-finals. After a thrilling game at Old Trafford, ended 3-2 for the red devils, the return leg was perfectly played by Milan who went quickly into a double advantage and blocked any attempt of British club to be dangerous. The final score was 3–0. The final against Liverpool gave Milan the chance to revenge the defeat of two years earlier. This time it was Milan turn to bring the trophy home, thanks to a brace from Inzaghi. The club went on to win also their fifth UEFA Super Cup, 3–1 against Sevilla, and their first Fifa Club's World Cup, 4–2 against Boca Juniors.

After several years at high level on both national and international fronts, Milan experienced a couple of less competitive seasons. In the 2007–08 Champions League they were eliminated in the round of 16 by Arsenal, and the following season they couldn't go beyond the round of 32 in the UEFA Cup, being eliminated by Werder Bremen. New signings of Robinho and Zlatan Ibrahimović, as well as Alexandre Pato and Ronaldinho, made Milan supporters hope for a new era of European successes, but that would not be the case. In 2009–10 and 2010–11 Milan was eliminated in the Champions League round of 16, and in 2011-12 they got defeated by Barcelona in the quarter-finals, after having eliminated Arsenal in the previous knockout round. This season saw the retirement and departure of many of the players on whom Milan built its successes, leaving behind a team that required a big strengthening to keep the same levels achieved in the previous decades.

=== 2012–present: Downturn and comeback under Pioli and new ownership ===
However, such investments would not come, and the team struggled for many seasons in the Serie A, and in European field did not achieve any remarkable results, being eliminated in the round of 16 both in 2012–13 and in 2013–14, by Barcelona and Atlético Madrid respectively. In 2014–15 and for the next two seasons, Milan did not take part into any European competition. In 2017–18, under a new ownership, Milan put in place several new signings, but despite those, results kept being scarce, including an elimination in the Europa League round of 16 by Arsenal. The next season, Milan did not even make it through the group stage of Europa League. The high expenses of the previous transfer market sessions and the big debts it generated, caused Milan to violate the rules of Financial Fair Play, and they willingly accepted the punishment of UEFA to not admit the club in the 2019–20 Europa League season, allowing them to extinguish all further investigations and start from scratch, thanks also to a new change of ownership.

The new management provided a more solid and forward-looking investment strategy, aimed at building a team of young players with big motivations, to be grown by few experienced players. It is in this perspective that the signing of Zlatan Ibrahimović had to be seen. The team, under the guide of manager Stefano Pioli, slowly reinstated its presence first in the Serie A and then in the Champions League. In fact, in 2021–22 Milan won its first scudetto in eleven years, and took part to the Champions League after seven seasons since the last time, even though they were eliminated in the group stage. The following season was more successful, and saw the club advancing to the knockout phase thanks to the second place in the group stage, behind Chelsea. In the round of 16 they eliminated Tottenham, as a result of a 1-0 home win followed by a goalless draw in London. In the quarter-finals Milan faced country-rivals Napoli, and went through again with a 1-0 win in San Siro and a 1-1 draw in the return match. In the semi-finals the Rossoneri met their city-rivals of Inter Milan, with the two clubs facing each other for the third time in European competitions. Unlike the previous two occurrences, this time the Nerazzurri prevailed, thanks to a double win (2-0 in the first leg and 1-0 in the second one). This was the most successful European campaign for AC Milan since the 2006–07 season.

== Matches ==
AC Milan's score listed first.

=== UEFA and FIFA competitions ===
Season	Competition	Round	Opposition	Home	Away	Aggregate (Play-off)
1955–56	European Cup	First round	(Saar Protectorate) 1. FC Saarbrücken	3–4	4–1	7–5
1955–56	European Cup	Quarter-finals	(Austria) Rapid Wien	7–2	1–1	8–3
1955–56	European Cup	Semi-finals	(Spain) Real Madrid	2–1	2–4	4–5
1957–58	European Cup	Preliminary round	(Austria) Rapid Wien	4–1	2–5	(4–2)
1957–58	European Cup	First round	(Scotland) Rangers	2–0	4–1	6–1
1957–58	European Cup	Quarter-finals	(West Germany) Borussia Dortmund	4–1	1–1	5–2
1957–58	European Cup	Semi-finals	(England) Manchester United	4–0	1–2	5–2
1957–58	European Cup	Final	(Spain) Real Madrid	2–3		
1959–60	European Cup	Preliminary round	(Greece) Olympiacos	3–1	2–2	5–3
1959–60	European Cup	First round	(Spain) Barcelona	0–2	1–5	1–7
1962–63	European Cup	Preliminary round	(Luxembourg) Union Luxembourg	8–0	6–0	14–0
1962–63	European Cup	First round	(England) Ipswich Town	3–0	1–2	4–2
1962–63	European Cup	Quarter-finals	(Turkey) Galatasaray	5–0	3–1	8–1
1962–63	European Cup	Semi-finals	(Scotland) Dundee	5–1	0–1	5–2
1962–63	European Cup	Final	(Portugal) Benfica	2–1		
1963–64	Intercontinental Cup	Final	(Brazil) Santos	4–2	2–4	(0–1)
1963–64	European Cup	First round	(Sweden) IFK Norrköping	5–2	1–1	6–3
1963–64	European Cup	Quarter-finals	(Spain) Real Madrid	2–0	1–4	3–4
1967–68	Cup Winners' Cup	First round	(Bulgaria) Levski Sofia	5–1	1–1	6–2
1967–68	Cup Winners' Cup	Second round	(Hungary) Győri Vasas ETO	1–1	2–2	3–3 (Note: Milan won on away goals.)
1967–68	Cup Winners' Cup	Quarter-finals	(Belgium) Standard Liège	1–1	1–1	(2–0)
1967–68	Cup Winners' Cup	Semi-finals	(West Germany) Bayern Munich	2–0	0–0	2–0
1967–68	Cup Winners' Cup	Final	(West Germany) Hamburger SV	2–0		
1968–69	European Cup	First round	(Sweden) Malmö FF	4–1	1–2	5–3
1968–69	European Cup	Quarter-finals	(Scotland) Celtic	0–0	1–0	1–0
1968–69	European Cup	Semi-finals	(England) Manchester United	2–0	0–1	2–1
1968–69	European Cup	Final	(Netherlands) Ajax	4–1		
1969–70	Intercontinental Cup	Final	(Argentina) Estudiantes (LP)	3–0	1–2	4–2
1969–70	European Cup	First round	(Luxembourg) Avenir Beggen	5–0	3–0	8–0
1969–70	European Cup	Second round	(Netherlands) Feyenoord	1–0	0–2	1–2
1971–72	UEFA Cup	First round	(Cyprus) Digenis Akritas Morphou	4–0	3–0	7–0
1971–72	UEFA Cup	Second round	(West Germany) Hertha BSC	4–2	1–2	5–4
1971–72	UEFA Cup	Third round	(Scotland) Dundee	3–0	0–2	3–2
1971–72	UEFA Cup	Quarter-finals	(Belgium) Lierse	2–0	1–1	3–1
1971–72	UEFA Cup	Semi-finals	(England) Tottenham Hotspur	1–1	1–2	2–3
1972–73	Cup Winners' Cup	First round	(Luxembourg) Red Boys Differdange	3–0	4–1	7–1
1972–73	Cup Winners' Cup	Second round	(Poland) Legia Warsaw	2–1	1–1	3–2
1972–73	Cup Winners' Cup	Quarter-finals	(Soviet Union) Spartak Moscow	1–1	1–0	2–1
1972–73	Cup Winners' Cup	Semi-finals	(Czechoslovakia) Sparta Prague	1–0	1–0	2–0
1972–73	Cup Winners' Cup	Final	(England) Leeds United	1–0		
1973–74	European Super Cup	Final	(Netherlands) Ajax	1–0	0–6	1–6
1973–74	Cup Winners' Cup	First round	(Socialist Federal Republic of Yugoslavia) Dinamo Zagreb	3–1	1–0	4–1
1973–74	Cup Winners' Cup	Second round	(Austria) Rapid Wien	0–0	2–0	2–0
1973–74	Cup Winners' Cup	Quarter-finals	(Greece) PAOK	3–0	2–2	5–2
1973–74	Cup Winners' Cup	Semi-finals	(West Germany) Borussia Mönchengladbach	2–0	0–1	2–1
1973–74	Cup Winners' Cup	Final	(East Germany) 1. FC Magdeburg	0–2		
1975–76	UEFA Cup	First round	(England) Everton	1–0	0–0	1–0
1975–76	UEFA Cup	Second round	(Republic of Ireland) Athlone Town	3–0	0–0	3–0
1975–76	UEFA Cup	Third round	(Soviet Union) Spartak Moscow	4–0	0–2	4–2
1975–76	UEFA Cup	Quarter-finals	(Belgium) Club Brugge	2–1	0–2	2–3
1976–77	UEFA Cup	First round	(Romania) Dinamo București	2–1	0–0	2–1
1976–77	UEFA Cup	Second round	(Bulgaria) Akademik Sofia	2–0	3–4	5–4
1976–77	UEFA Cup	Third round	(Spain) Athletic Bilbao	3–1	1–4	4–5
1977–78	Cup Winners' Cup	First round	(Spain) Real Betis	2–1	0–2	2–3
1978–79	UEFA Cup	First round	(Czechoslovakia) Lokomotíva Košice	1–0	0–1	1–1 (Note: Milan won 8–7 on penalties.)
1978–79	UEFA Cup	Second round	(Bulgaria) Levski Sofia	3–1	1–1	4–2
1978–79	UEFA Cup	Third round	(England) Manchester City	2–2	0–3	2–5
1979–80	European Cup	First round	(Portugal) Porto	0–1	0–0	0–1
1985–86	UEFA Cup	First round	(France) Auxerre	3–0	1–3	4–3
1985–86	UEFA Cup	Second round	(East Germany) Lokomotive Leipzig	2–0	1–3	3–3
1985–86	UEFA Cup	Third round	(Belgium) Waregem	1–2	1–1	2–3
1987–88	UEFA Cup	First round	(Spain) Sporting Gijón	3–0	0–1	3–1
1987–88	UEFA Cup	Second round	(Spain) Espanyol	0–2	0–0	0–2
1988–89	European Cup	First round	(Bulgaria) Levski Sofia	5–2	2–0	7–2
1988–89	European Cup	Second round	(Socialist Federal Republic of Yugoslavia) Red Star Belgrade	1–1	1–1	2–2 (Note: Milan won 4–2 on penalties.)
1988–89	European Cup	Quarter-finals	(West Germany) Werder Bremen	0–0	1–0	1–0
1988–89	European Cup	Semi-finals	(Spain) Real Madrid	5–0	1–1	6–1
1988–89	European Cup	Final	(Romania) Steaua București	4–0		
1989–90	European Super Cup	Final	(Spain) Barcelona	1–0	1–1	2–1
1989–90	Intercontinental Cup	Final	(Colombia) Atlético Nacional	1–0		
1989–90	European Cup	First round	(Finland) HJK	4–0	1–0	5–0
1989–90	European Cup	Second round	(Spain) Real Madrid	2–0	0–1	2–1
1989–90	European Cup	Quarter-finals	(Belgium) KV Mechelen	2–0	0–0	2–0
1989–90	European Cup	Semi-finals	(West Germany) Bayern Munich	1–0	1–2	2–2
1989–90	European Cup	Final	(Portugal) Benfica	1–0		
1990–91	European Super Cup	Final	(Italy) Sampdoria	2–0	1–1	3–1
1990–91	Intercontinental Cup	Final	(Paraguay) Olimpia Asunción	3–0		
1990–91	European Cup	Second round	(Belgium) Club Brugge	0–0	1–0	1–0
1990–91	European Cup	Quarter-finals	(France) Marseille	1–1	0–3	1–4
1992–93	Champions League	First round	(Slovenia) Olimpija Ljubljana	4–0	3–0	7–0
1992–93	Champions League	Second round	(Czechoslovakia) Slovan Bratislava	4–0	1–0	5–0
1992–93	Champions League	Group stage	(Sweden) IFK Göteborg	4–0	1–0	1st
1992–93	Champions League	Group stage	(Netherlands) PSV Eindhoven	2–0	2–1	1st
1992–93	Champions League	Group stage	(Portugal) Porto	1–0	1–0	1st
1992–93	Champions League	Final	(France) Marseille	0–1		
1993–94	European Super Cup	Final	(Italy) Parma	0–2	1–0	1–2
1993–94	Intercontinental Cup	Final	(Brazil) São Paulo	2–3		
1993–94	Champions League	First round	(Switzerland) Aarau	0–0	1–0	1–0
1993–94	Champions League	Second round	(Denmark) Copenhagen	1–0	6–0	7–0
1993–94	Champions League	Group stage	(Belgium) Anderlecht	0–0	0–0	1st
1993–94	Champions League	Group stage	(Portugal) Porto	3–0	0–0	1st
1993–94	Champions League	Group stage	(Germany) Werder Bremen	2–1	1–1	1st
1993–94	Champions League	Semi-finals	(France) Monaco	3–0	—N/a	
1993–94	Champions League	Final	(Spain) Barcelona	4–0		
1994–95	European Super Cup	Final	(England) Arsenal	2–0	0–0	2–0
1994–95	Intercontinental Cup	Final	(Argentina) Vélez Sársfield	0–2		
1994–95	Champions League	Group stage	(Netherlands) Ajax	0–2	0–2	2nd
1994–95	Champions League	Group stage	(Austria) Casino Salzburg	3–0	1–0	2nd
1994–95	Champions League	Group stage	(Greece) AEK Athens	2–1	0–0	2nd
1994–95	Champions League	Quarter-finals	(Portugal) Benfica	2–0	0–0	2–0
1994–95	Champions League	Semi-finals	(France) Paris Saint-Germain	2–0	1–0	3–0
1994–95	Champions League	Final	(Netherlands) Ajax	0–1		
1995–96	UEFA Cup	First round	(Poland) Zagłębie Lubin	4–0	4–1	8–1
1995–96	UEFA Cup	Second round	(France) Strasbourg	2–1	1–0	3–1
1995–96	UEFA Cup	Third round	(Czech Republic) Sparta Prague	2–0	0–0	2–0
1995–96	UEFA Cup	Quarter-finals	(France) Bordeaux	2–0	0–3	2–3
1996–97	Champions League	Group stage	(Portugal) Porto	2–3	1–1	3rd
1996–97	Champions League	Group stage	(Norway) Rosenborg	1–2	4–1	3rd
1996–97	Champions League	Group stage	(Sweden) IFK Göteborg	4–2	1–2	3rd
1999–2000	Champions League	First group stage	(England) Chelsea	1–1	0–0	4th
1999–2000	Champions League	First group stage	(Turkey) Galatasaray	2–1	2–3	4th
1999–2000	Champions League	First group stage	(Germany) Hertha BSC	1–1	0–1	4th
2000–01	Champions League	Third qualifying round	(Croatia) Dinamo Zagreb	3–1	3–0	6–1
2000–01	Champions League	First group stage	(Turkey) Beşiktaş	4–1	2–0	1st
2000–01	Champions League	First group stage	(England) Leeds United	1–1	0–1	1st
2000–01	Champions League	First group stage	(Spain) Barcelona	3–3	2–0	1st
2000–01	Champions League	Second group stage	(Turkey) Galatasaray	2–2	0–2	3rd
2000–01	Champions League	Second group stage	(Spain) Deportivo La Coruña	1–1	1–0	3rd
2000–01	Champions League	Second group stage	(France) Paris Saint-Germain	1–1	1–1	3rd
2001–02	UEFA Cup	First round	(Belarus) BATE Borisov	4–0	2–0	6–0
2001–02	UEFA Cup	Second round	(Bulgaria) CSKA Sofia	2–0	1–0	3–0
2001–02	UEFA Cup	Third round	(Portugal) Sporting CP	2–0	1–1	3–1
2001–02	UEFA Cup	Fourth round	(Netherlands) Roda JC	0–1	1–0	1–1 (Note: Milan won 3–2 on penalties.)
2001–02	UEFA Cup	Quarter-finals	(Israel) Hapoel Tel Aviv	2–0	0–1	2–1
2001–02	UEFA Cup	Semi-finals	(Germany) Borussia Dortmund	3–1	0–4	3–5
2002–03	Champions League	Third qualifying round	(Czech Republic) Slovan Liberec	1–0	1–2	2–2
2002–03	Champions League	First group stage	(France) Lens	2–1	1–2	1st
2002–03	Champions League	First group stage	(Spain) Deportivo La Coruña	1–2	4–0	1st
2002–03	Champions League	First group stage	(Germany) Bayern Munich	2–1	2–1	1st
2002–03	Champions League	Second group stage	(Spain) Real Madrid	1–0	1–3	1st
2002–03	Champions League	Second group stage	(Germany) Borussia Dortmund	0–1	1–0	1st
2002–03	Champions League	Second group stage	(Russia) Lokomotiv Moscow	1–0	1–0	1st
2002–03	Champions League	Quarter-finals	(Netherlands) Ajax	3–2	0–0	3–2
2002–03	Champions League	Semi-finals	(Italy) Inter Milan	0–0	1–1	1–1
2002–03	Champions League	Final	(Italy) Juventus	0–0		
2003–04	UEFA Super Cup	Final	(Portugal) Porto	1–0		
2003–04	Intercontinental Cup	Final	(Argentina) Boca Juniors	1–1 (Note: Milan lost 3–1 on penalties.)		
2003–04	Champions League	Group stage	(Netherlands) Ajax	1–0	1–0	1st
2003–04	Champions League	Group stage	(Spain) Celta Vigo	1–2	0–0	1st
2003–04	Champions League	Group stage	(Belgium) Club Brugge	0–1	1–0	1st
2003–04	Champions League	Round of 16	(Czech Republic) Sparta Prague	4–1	0–0	4–1
2003–04	Champions League	Quarter-finals	(Spain) Deportivo La Coruña	4–1	0–4	4–5
2004–05	Champions League	Group stage	(Ukraine) Shakhtar Donetsk	4–0	1–0	1st
2004–05	Champions League	Group stage	(Scotland) Celtic	3–1	0–0	1st
2004–05	Champions League	Group stage	(Spain) Barcelona	1–0	1–2	1st
2004–05	Champions League	Round of 16	(England) Manchester United	1–0	1–0	2–0
2004–05	Champions League	Quarter-finals	(Italy) Inter Milan	2–0	3–0	5–0
2004–05	Champions League	Semi-finals	(Netherlands) PSV Eindhoven	2–0	1–3	3–3
2004–05	Champions League	Final	(England) Liverpool	3–3 (Note: Milan lost 3–2 on penalties.)		
2005–06	Champions League	Group stage	(Turkey) Fenerbahçe	3–1	4–0	1st
2005–06	Champions League	Group stage	(Germany) Schalke 04	3–2	2–2	1st
2005–06	Champions League	Group stage	(Netherlands) PSV Eindhoven	0–0	0–1	1st
2005–06	Champions League	Round of 16	(Germany) Bayern Munich	4–1	1–1	5–2
2005–06	Champions League	Quarter-finals	(France) Lyon	3–1	0–0	3–1
2005–06	Champions League	Semi-finals	(Spain) Barcelona	0–1	0–0	0–1
2006–07	Champions League	Third qualifying round	(Serbia) Red Star Belgrade	1–0	2–1	3–1
2006–07	Champions League	Group stage	(Greece) AEK Athens	3–0	0–1	1st
2006–07	Champions League	Group stage	(France) Lille	0–2	0–0	1st
2006–07	Champions League	Group stage	(Belgium) Anderlecht	4–1	1–0	1st
2006–07	Champions League	Round of 16	(Scotland) Celtic	1–0	0–0	1–0
2006–07	Champions League	Quarter-finals	(Germany) Bayern Munich	2–2	2–0	4–2
2006–07	Champions League	Semi-finals	(England) Manchester United	3–0	2–3	5–3
2006–07	Champions League	Final	(England) Liverpool	2–1		
2007–08	UEFA Super Cup	Final	(Spain) Sevilla	3–1		
2007–08	FIFA Club World Cup	Semi-finals	(Japan) Urawa Red Diamonds	1–0		
2007–08	FIFA Club World Cup	Final	(Argentina) Boca Juniors	4–2		
2007–08	Champions League	Group stage	(Portugal) Benfica	2–1	1–1	1st
2007–08	Champions League	Group stage	(Scotland) Celtic	1–0	1–2	1st
2007–08	Champions League	Group stage	(Ukraine) Shakhtar Donetsk	4–1	3–0	1st
2007–08	Champions League	Round of 16	(England) Arsenal	0–2	0–0	0–2
2008–09	UEFA Cup	First round	(Switzerland) Zürich	3–1	1–0	4–1
2008–09	UEFA Cup	Group stage	(Netherlands) Heerenveen	—N/a	3–1	2nd
2008–09	UEFA Cup	Group stage	(Portugal) Braga	1–0	—N/a	2nd
2008–09	UEFA Cup	Group stage	(England) Portsmouth	—N/a	2–2	2nd
2008–09	UEFA Cup	Group stage	(Germany) VfL Wolfsburg	2–2	—N/a	2nd
2008–09	UEFA Cup	Round of 32	(Germany) Werder Bremen	2–2	1–1	3–3 (Note: Milan lost on away goals.)
2009–10	Champions League	Group stage	(France) Marseille	1–1	2–1	2nd
2009–10	Champions League	Group stage	(Switzerland) Zürich	0–1	1–1	2nd
2009–10	Champions League	Group stage	(Spain) Real Madrid	1–1	3–2	2nd
2009–10	Champions League	Round of 16	(England) Manchester United	2–3	0–4	2–7
2010–11	Champions League	Group stage	(France) Auxerre	2–0	2–0	2nd
2010–11	Champions League	Group stage	(Netherlands) Ajax	0–2	1–1	2nd
2010–11	Champions League	Group stage	(Spain) Real Madrid	2–2	0–2	2nd
2010–11	Champions League	Round of 16	(England) Tottenham Hotspur	0–1	0–0	0–1
2011–12	Champions League	Group stage	(Spain) Barcelona	2–3	2–2	2nd
2011–12	Champions League	Group stage	(Czech Republic) Viktoria Plzeň	2–0	2–2	2nd
2011–12	Champions League	Group stage	(Belarus) BATE Borisov	2–0	1–1	2nd
2011–12	Champions League	Round of 16	(England) Arsenal	4–0	0–3	4–3
2011–12	Champions League	Quarter-finals	(Spain) Barcelona	0–0	1–3	1–3
2012–13	Champions League	Group stage	(Belgium) Anderlecht	0–0	3–1	2nd
2012–13	Champions League	Group stage	(Russia) Zenit Saint Petersburg	0–1	3–2	2nd
2012–13	Champions League	Group stage	(Spain) Málaga	1–1	0–1	2nd
2012–13	Champions League	Round of 16	(Spain) Barcelona	2–0	0–4	2–4
2013–14	Champions League	Play-off round	(Netherlands) PSV Eindhoven	3–0	1–1	4–1
2013–14	Champions League	Group stage	(Scotland) Celtic	2–0	3–0	2nd
2013–14	Champions League	Group stage	(Netherlands) Ajax	0–0	1–1	2nd
2013–14	Champions League	Group stage	(Spain) Barcelona	1–1	1–3	2nd
2013–14	Champions League	Round of 16	(Spain) Atlético Madrid	0–1	1–4	1–5
2017–18	Europa League	Third qualifying round	(Romania) Universitatea Craiova	2–0	1–0	3–0
2017–18	Europa League	Play-off round	(North Macedonia) Shkëndija	6–0	1–0	7–0
2017–18	Europa League	Group stage	Austria Wien	5–1	5–1	1st
2017–18	Europa League	Group stage	(Croatia) Rijeka	3–2	0–2	1st
2017–18	Europa League	Group stage	(Greece) AEK Athens	0–0	0–0	1st
2017–18	Europa League	Round of 32	(Bulgaria) Ludogorets Razgrad	1–0	3–0	4–0
2017–18	Europa League	Round of 16	(England) Arsenal	0–2	1–3	1–5
2018–19	Europa League	Group stage	(Luxembourg) F91 Dudelange	5–2	1–0	3rd
2018–19	Europa League	Group stage	(Greece) Olympiacos	3–1	1–3	3rd
2018–19	Europa League	Group stage	(Spain) Real Betis	1–2	1–1	3rd
2020–21	Europa League	Second qualifying round	(Republic of Ireland) Shamrock Rovers	—N/a	2–0	
2020–21	Europa League	Third qualifying round	(Norway) Bodø/Glimt	3–2	—N/a	
2020–21	Europa League	Play-off round	(Portugal) Rio Ave	—N/a	2–2 (Note: Milan won 9–8 on penalties.)	
2020–21	Europa League	Group stage	(Scotland) Celtic	4–2	3–1	1st
2020–21	Europa League	Group stage	(Czech Republic) Sparta Prague	3–0	1–0	1st
2020–21	Europa League	Group stage	(France) Lille	0–3	1–1	1st
2020–21	Europa League	Round of 32	(Serbia) Red Star Belgrade	1–1	2–2	3–3
2020–21	Europa League	Round of 16	(England) Manchester United	0–1	1–1	1–2
2021–22	Champions League	Group stage	(England) Liverpool	1–2	2–3	4th
2021–22	Champions League	Group stage	(Spain) Atlético Madrid	1–2	1–0	4th
2021–22	Champions League	Group stage	(Portugal) Porto	1–1	0–1	4th
2022–23	Champions League	Group stage	(Austria) Red Bull Salzburg	4–0	1–1	2nd
2022–23	Champions League	Group stage	(Croatia) Dinamo Zagreb	3–1	4–0	2nd
2022–23	Champions League	Group stage	(England) Chelsea	0–2	0–3	2nd
2022–23	Champions League	Round of 16	(England) Tottenham Hotspur	1–0	0–0	1–0
2022–23	Champions League	Quarter-finals	(Italy) Napoli	1–0	1–1	2–1
2022–23	Champions League	Semi-finals	(Italy) Inter Milan	0–2	0–1	0–3
2023–24	Champions League	Group stage	(England) Newcastle United	0–0	2–1	3rd
2023–24	Champions League	Group stage	(Germany) Borussia Dortmund	1–3	0–0	3rd
2023–24	Champions League	Group stage	(France) Paris Saint-Germain	2–1	0–3	3rd
2023–24	Europa League	Knockout round play-offs	(France) Rennes	3–0	2–3	5–3
2023–24	Europa League	Round of 16	(Czech Republic) Slavia Prague	4–2	3–1	7–3
2023–24	Europa League	Quarter-finals	(Italy) Roma	0–1	1–2	1–3
2024–25	Champions League	League phase	(England) Liverpool	1–3	—N/a	13th
2024–25	Champions League	League phase	(Germany) Bayer Leverkusen	—N/a	0–1	13th
2024–25	Champions League	League phase	(Belgium) Club Brugge	3–1	—N/a	13th
2024–25	Champions League	League phase	(Spain) Real Madrid	—N/a	3–1	13th
2024–25	Champions League	League phase	(Slovakia) Slovan Bratislava	—N/a	3–2	13th
2024–25	Champions League	League phase	(Serbia) Red Star Belgrade	2–1	—N/a	13th
2024–25	Champions League	League phase	(Spain) Girona	1–0	—N/a	13th
2024–25	Champions League	League phase	(Croatia) Dinamo Zagreb	—N/a	1–2	13th
2024–25	Champions League	Knockout phase play-offs	(Netherlands) Feyenoord	1–1	0–1	1–2
2026–27	Europa League	League phase	(Portugal) Benfica	0–2	—N/a	
2026–27	Europa League	League phase	(Austria) Red Bull Salzburg	—N/a	4–0	
2026–27	Europa League	League phase	(England) Bournemouth	—N/a	0–3	
2026–27	Europa League	League phase	(Hungary) Ferencváros	0–2	—N/a	
2026–27	Europa League	League phase	(Greece) Olympiacos	—N/a		
2026–27	Europa League	League phase	(England) Sunderland		—N/a	
2026–27	Europa League	League phase	(Bulgaria) Levski Sofia	—N/a		
2026–27	Europa League	League phase	(Armenia) Ararat-Armenia		—N/a	

=== Other international competitions ===
Season	Competition	Round	Opposition	Score
1937–38	Mitropa Cup	First round	(Romania) Ripensia Timișoara	0–3 (A), 3–1 (H)
1950–51	Latin Cup	Semi-finals	(Spain) Atlético Madrid	4–1 (H)
1950–51	Latin Cup	Final	(France) Lille	5–0 (H)
1952–53	Latin Cup	Semi-finals	(Portugal) Sporting CP	4–3 (A)
1952–53	Latin Cup	Final	(France) Reims	0–3 (A)
1954–55	Latin Cup	Semi-finals	(France) Reims	2–3 (N)
1954–55	Latin Cup	Third place match	(Portugal) Belenenses	3–1 (N)
1955–56	Latin Cup	Semi-finals	(Portugal) Benfica	4–2 (N)
1955–56	Latin Cup	Final	(Spain) Athletic Bilbao	3–1 (N)
1956–57	Latin Cup	Semi-finals	(Spain) Real Madrid	1–5 (A)
1956–57	Latin Cup	Third place match	(France) Saint-Étienne	4–3 (N)
1959–60	Coppa dell'Amicizia	(round-robin tournament) (Note: The 1959, 1960, and 1961 editions of the Coppa dell'Amicizia were played as a series of home-and-away matches between one team from the Italian Football League (LNP) and one from the French Football League (LFP), with points for the final classification being awarded to each team's respective league.)	(France) Nice	3–3 (A), 4–0 (H)
1959–60	Coppa dell'Amicizia	(round-robin tournament)	(France) Toulouse	6–3 (H), 2–0 (A)
1960–61	Coppa dell'Amicizia	(round-robin tournament)	(France) Nîmes	0–0 (H), 0–2 (A)
1961–62	Inter-Cities Fairs Cup	First round	(Socialist Federal Republic of Yugoslavia) Novi Sad XI (Note: Representative side made up of players from different clubs, in compliance with a rule which allowed only one team from each city to enter the Inter-Cities Fairs Cup.)	0–0 (H), 0–2 (A)
1961–62	Coppa dell'Amicizia	Round of 16	(France) Nice	6–3 (A), 3–1 (H)
1961–62	Coppa dell'Amicizia	Quarter-finals	(France) Toulouse	5–2 (H), 4–1 (A)
1961–62	Coppa dell'Amicizia	Semi-finals	(Italy) Torino	1–2 (A), 1–1 (H)
1962–63	Coppa dell'Amicizia	Quarter-finals	(France) Lens	3–1 (A), 2–0 (H)
1962–63	Coppa dell'Amicizia	Semi-finals	(France) Lyon	4–2 (A)
1962–63	Coppa dell'Amicizia	Final	(Italy) Genoa	1–2 (H)
1964–65	Inter-Cities Fairs Cup	First round	(France) Strasbourg	0–2 (A), 1–0 (H)
1965–66	Inter-Cities Fairs Cup	First round	(France) Strasbourg	1–0 (H), 1–2 (A), 1–1 (H) (Note: Milan won on a coin toss.)
1965–66	Inter-Cities Fairs Cup	Second round	(Portugal) CUF Barreiro	0–2 (A), 2–0 (H), 1–0 (H)
1965–66	Inter-Cities Fairs Cup	Third round	(England) Chelsea	1–2 (A), 2–1 (H), 1–1 (H) (Note: Milan lost on a coin toss.)
1966–67	Mitropa Cup	First round	(Socialist Federal Republic of Yugoslavia) Dinamo Zagreb	0–1 (A), 0–0 (H)
1966–67	Cup of the Alps	(swiss-system tournament) (Note: Each of the eight participants played once against five opponents)	(Switzerland) Servette	0–0 (A)
1966–67	Cup of the Alps	(swiss-system tournament)	(West Germany) 1860 Munich	0–0 (A)
1966–67	Cup of the Alps	(swiss-system tournament)	(West Germany) Eintracht Frankfurt	0–1 (A)
1966–67	Cup of the Alps	(swiss-system tournament)	(Switzerland) Basel	3–0 (A)
1966–67	Cup of the Alps	(swiss-system tournament)	(Switzerland) Zürich	0–2 (A)
1981–82	Mitropa Cup	(round-robin tournament)	(Czechoslovakia) Vítkovice	1–2 (A), 3–0 (H)
1981–82	Mitropa Cup	(round-robin tournament)	(Hungary) Haladás	2–0 (H), 1–0 (A)
1981–82	Mitropa Cup	(round-robin tournament)	(Socialist Federal Republic of Yugoslavia) Osijek	1–1 (A), 2–1 (H)

== Overall record ==
=== By competition ===
As of 5 November 2026.

Competition	Pld	W	D	L	GF	GA	GD
European Cup / Champions League	283	138	71	74	457	274	+183
Cup Winners' Cup	30	17	10	3	47	19	+28
UEFA Cup / Europa League	111	57	23	31	188	118	+70
Super Cup	12	7	3	2	13	11	+2
Intercontinental Cup	10	4	1	5	17	15	+2
UEFA competitions	446	223	108	115	722	437	+285
FIFA Club World Cup	2	2	0	0	5	2	+3
UEFA and FIFA competitions	448	225	108	115	727	439	+288
Mitropa Cup	10	5	2	3	13	9	+4
Latin Cup	10	7	0	3	30	22	+8
Inter-Cities Fairs Cup	13	5	3	5	11	13	−2
Coppa dell'Amicizia	16	10	3	3	45	23	+22
Cup of the Alps	5	1	2	2	3	3	0
Other competitions (Non-UEFA and FIFA)	54	28	10	16	102	70	+32
Total	502	253	118	131	829	509	+318

=== By club ===
As of 5 November 2026.

Key

Positive balance (more wins than losses)
Neutral balance (as many wins as losses)
Negative balance (more losses than wins)

Team	Country	Pld	W	D	L	GF	GA	GD	Win%
1860 Munich	Germany	1	0	1	0	0	0	+0	0.00
Aarau	Switzerland	2	1	1	0	1	0	+1	50.00
AEK Athens	Greece	6	2	3	1	5	2	+3	33.33
Ajax	Netherlands	14	5	4	5	12	18	−6	35.71
Akademik Sofia	Bulgaria	2	1	0	1	5	4	+1	50.00
Anderlecht	Belgium	6	3	3	0	8	2	+6	50.00
Arsenal	England	8	2	2	4	7	10	−3	25.00
Athletic Bilbao	Spain	3	2	0	1	7	6	+1	66.67
Athlone Town	Ireland	2	1	1	0	3	0	+3	50.00
Atlético Madrid	Spain	5	2	0	3	7	8	−1	40.00
Atlético Nacional	Colombia	1	1	0	0	1	0	+1	100.00
Austria Wien	Austria	2	2	0	0	10	2	+8	100.00
Auxerre	France	4	3	0	1	8	3	+5	75.00
Avenir Beggen	Luxembourg	2	2	0	0	8	0	+8	100.00
Barcelona	Spain	19	5	6	8	23	30	−7	26.32
Basel	Switzerland	1	1	0	0	3	0	+3	100.00
BATE Borisov	Belarus	4	3	1	0	9	1	+8	75.00
Bayer Leverkusen	Germany	1	0	0	1	0	1	−1	0.00
Bayern Munich	Germany	10	6	3	1	17	8	+9	60.00
Belenenses	Portugal	1	1	0	0	3	1	+2	100.00
Benfica	Portugal	8	5	2	1	12	7	+5	62.50
Beşiktaş	Turkey	2	2	0	0	6	1	+5	100.00
Boca Juniors	Argentina	2	1	1	0	5	3	+2	50.00
Bodø/Glimt	Norway	1	1	0	0	3	2	+1	100.00
Bordeaux	France	2	1	0	1	2	3	−1	50.00
Borussia Dortmund	Germany	8	3	2	3	10	11	−1	37.50
Borussia Mönchengladbach	Germany	2	1	0	1	2	1	+1	50.00
Bournemouth	England	1	0	0	1	0	3	−3	0.00
Braga	Portugal	1	1	0	0	1	0	+1	100.00
Celta Vigo	Spain	2	0	1	1	1	2	−1	0.00
Celtic	Scotland	12	8	3	1	19	6	+13	66.67
Chelsea	England	7	1	3	3	5	10	−5	14.29
Club Brugge	Belgium	7	4	1	2	7	5	+2	57.14
Copenhagen	Denmark	2	2	0	0	7	0	+7	100.00
CSKA Sofia	Bulgaria	2	2	0	0	3	0	+3	100.00
Deportivo La Coruña	Spain	6	3	1	2	11	8	+3	50.00
Digenis Akritas Morphou	Cyprus	2	2	0	0	7	0	+7	100.00
Dinamo Bucureşti	Romania	2	1	1	0	2	1	+1	50.00
Dinamo Zagreb	Croatia	9	6	1	2	18	6	+12	66.67
Dundee	Scotland	4	2	0	2	8	4	+4	50.00
Eintracht Frankfurt	Germany	1	0	0	1	0	1	−1	0.00
Espanyol	Spain	2	0	1	1	0	2	−2	0.00
Estudiantes (LP)	Argentina	2	1	0	1	4	2	+2	50.00
Everton	England	2	1	1	0	1	0	+1	50.00
F91 Dudelange	Luxembourg	2	2	0	0	6	2	+4	100.00
Fabril Barreiro	Portugal	3	2	0	1	3	2	+1	66.67
FCSB	Romania	1	1	0	0	4	0	+4	100.00
Fenerbahçe	Turkey	2	2	0	0	7	1	+6	100.00
Ferencváros	Hungary	1	0	0	1	0	2	−2	0.00
Feyenoord	Netherlands	4	1	1	2	2	4	−2	25.00
Galatasaray	Turkey	6	3	1	2	14	9	+5	50.00
Genoa	Italy	1	0	0	1	1	2	−1	0.00
Girona	Spain	1	1	0	0	1	0	+1	100.00
IFK Göteborg	Sweden	4	3	0	1	10	4	+6	75.00
Győri ETO	Hungary	2	0	2	0	3	3	+0	0.00
Haladás	Hungary	2	2	0	0	3	0	+3	100.00
Hamburger SV	Germany	1	1	0	0	2	0	+2	100.00
Hapeol Tel Aviv	Israel	2	1	0	1	2	1	+1	50.00
Heerenveen	Netherlands	1	1	0	0	3	1	+2	100.00
Hertha BSC	Germany	4	1	1	2	6	6	+0	25.00
HJK	Finland	2	2	0	0	5	0	+5	100.00
Inter Milan	Italy	6	2	2	2	6	4	+2	33.33
Ipswich Town	England	2	1	0	1	4	2	+2	50.00
Juventus	Italy	1	0	1	0	0	0	+0	0.00
Lille	France	5	1	2	2	6	6	+0	20.00
KV Melechen	Belgium	2	1	1	0	2	0	+2	50.00
Monaco	France	1	1	0	0	3	0	+3	100.00
Leeds United	England	3	1	1	1	2	2	+0	33.33
Legia Warsaw	Poland	2	1	1	0	3	2	+1	50.00
Lens	France	4	3	0	1	8	4	+4	75.00
Levski Sofia	Bulgaria	6	4	2	0	17	5	+12	66.67
Lierse	Belgium	2	1	1	0	3	1	+2	50.00
Liverpool	England	5	1	1	3	9	12	−3	20.00
Lokomotiv Moskva	Russia	2	2	0	0	2	0	+2	100.00
Lokomotíva Košice	Slovakia	2	1	0	1	1	1	+0	50.00
Lokomotive Leipzig	Germany	2	1	0	1	3	3	+0	50.00
Lyon	France	3	2	1	0	7	3	+4	66.67
Ludogorets Razgrad	Bulgaria	2	2	0	0	4	0	+4	100.00
1. FC Magdeburg	Germany	1	0	0	1	0	2	−2	0.00
Málaga	Spain	2	0	1	1	1	2	−1	0.00
Malmö FF	Sweden	2	1	0	1	5	3	+2	50.00
Manchester City	England	2	0	1	1	2	5	−3	0.00
Manchester United	England	12	5	1	6	17	15	+2	41.67
Marseille	France	5	1	2	2	4	7	−3	20.00
Napoli	Italy	2	1	1	0	2	1	+1	50.00
Newcastle United	England	2	1	1	0	2	1	+1	50.00
Nice	France	4	3	1	0	16	7	+9	75.00
Nîmes	France	2	0	1	1	0	2	−2	0.00
IFK Norrköping	Sweden	2	1	1	0	6	3	+3	50.00
Novi Sad XI	Serbia	2	0	1	1	0	2	−2	0.00
Olimpia Asunción	Paraguay	1	1	0	0	3	0	+3	100.00
Olimpija Ljubljana	Slovenia	2	2	0	0	7	0	+7	100.00
Olympiacos	Greece	4	2	1	1	9	7	+2	50.00
PAOK	Greece	2	1	1	0	5	2	+3	50.00
Paris Saint-Germain	France	6	3	2	1	7	6	+1	50.00
Parma	Italy	2	1	0	1	1	2	−1	50.00
Porto	Portugal	11	4	4	3	10	7	+3	36.36
Portsmouth	England	1	0	1	0	2	2	+0	0.00
PSV Eindhoven	Netherlands	8	4	2	2	11	6	+5	50.00
Osijek	Croatia	2	1	1	0	3	2	+1	50.00
Rangers	Scotland	2	2	0	0	6	1	+5	100.00
Rapid Wien	Austria	7	4	2	1	20	11	+9	57.14
Real Betis	Spain	4	1	1	2	4	6	−2	25.00
Real Madrid	Spain	17	7	3	7	29	30	−1	41.18
Red Boys Differdange	Luxembourg	2	2	0	0	7	1	+6	100.00
Red Bull Salzburg	Austria	5	4	1	0	13	1	+12	80.00
Red Star Belgrade	Serbia	7	3	4	0	10	7	+3	42.86
Reims	France	2	0	0	2	2	6	−4	0.00
Rennes	France	2	1	0	1	5	3	+2	50.00
Rijeka	Croatia	2	1	0	1	3	4	−1	50.00
Rio Ave	Portugal	1	0	1	0	2	2	+0	0.00
Ripensia Timișoara	Romania	2	1	0	1	3	4	−1	50.00
Roda JC	Netherlands	2	1	0	1	1	1	+0	50.00
Roma	Italy	2	0	0	2	1	3	−2	0.00
Rosenborg	Norway	2	1	0	1	5	3	+2	50.00
1. FC Saarbrücken	Germany	2	1	0	1	7	5	+2	50.00
Saint-Étienne	France	1	1	0	0	4	3	+1	100.00
Sampdoria	Italy	2	1	1	0	3	1	+2	50.00
Santos	Brazil	3	1	0	2	6	7	−1	33.33
São Paulo	Brazil	1	0	0	1	2	3	−1	0.00
Schalke 04	Germany	2	1	1	0	5	4	+1	50.00
Servette	Switzerland	1	0	1	0	0	0	+0	0.00
Sevilla	Spain	1	1	0	0	3	1	+2	100.00
Shakhtar Donetsk	Ukraine	4	4	0	0	12	1	+11	100.00
Shamrock Rovers	Ireland	1	1	0	0	2	0	+2	100.00
Shkëndija	North Macedonia	2	2	0	0	7	0	+7	100.00
Slavia Prague	Czech Republic	2	2	0	0	7	3	+4	100.00
Slovan Bratislava	Slovakia	3	3	0	0	8	2	+6	100.00
Slovan Liberec	Czech Republic	2	1	0	1	2	2	+0	50.00
Sparta Prague	Czech Republic	8	6	2	0	12	1	+11	75.00
Spartak Moscow	Russia	4	2	1	1	6	3	+3	50.00
Sporting CP	Portugal	3	2	1	0	7	4	+3	66.67
Sporting Gijón	Spain	2	1	0	1	3	1	+2	50.00
Standard Liège	Belgium	3	1	2	0	4	2	+2	33.33
Strasbourg	France	7	4	1	2	7	6	+1	57.14
Torino	Italy	2	0	1	1	2	3	−1	0.00
Toulouse	France	4	4	0	0	17	6	+11	100.00
Tottenham Hotspur	England	6	1	3	2	3	4	−1	16.67
Union Luxembourg	Luxembourg	2	2	0	0	14	0	+14	100.00
Universitatea Craiova	Romania	2	2	0	0	3	0	+3	100.00
Urawa Red Diamonds	Japan	1	1	0	0	1	0	+1	100.00
Vélez Sarsfield	Argentina	1	0	0	1	0	2	−2	0.00
Viktoria Plzeň	Czech Republic	2	1	1	0	4	2	+2	50.00
Vítkovice	Czech Republic	2	1	0	1	4	2	+2	50.00
Waregem	Belgium	2	0	1	1	2	3	−1	0.00
Werder Bremen	Germany	6	2	4	0	7	5	+2	33.33
VfL Wolfsburg	Germany	1	0	1	0	2	2	+0	0.00
Zagłębie Lubin	Poland	2	2	0	0	8	1	+7	100.00
Zenit Saint Petersburg	Russia	2	1	0	1	3	3	+0	50.00
Zürich	Switzerland	5	2	1	2	5	5	+0	40.00

=== By country ===
As of 5 November 2026.

Key

Positive balance (more wins than losses)
Neutral balance (as many wins as losses)
Negative balance (more losses than wins)

Country	Pld	W	D	L	GF	GA	GD	%Win
Argentina	5	2	1	2	9	7	+2	40.00
Austria	14	10	3	1	43	14	+29	71.43
Belarus	4	3	1	0	9	1	+8	75.00
Belgium	22	10	9	3	26	13	+13	45.45
Brazil	4	1	0	3	8	10	−2	25.00
Bulgaria	12	9	2	1	29	9	+20	75.00
Colombia	1	1	0	0	1	0	+1	100.00
Croatia	13	8	2	3	24	12	+12	61.54
Cyprus	2	2	0	0	7	0	+7	100.00
Czech Republic (Note: Includes Czech Republic and Czechoslovakia)	16	11	3	2	29	10	+19	68.75
Denmark	2	2	0	0	7	0	+7	100.00
England	51	14	15	22	54	66	−12	27.45
Finland	2	2	0	0	5	0	+5	100.00
France	52	28	10	14	96	65	+31	53.85
Germany (Note: Includes Germany, West Germany and East Germany)	42	17	13	12	61	49	+12	40.48
Greece	12	5	5	2	19	11	+8	41.67
Hungary	5	2	2	1	6	5	+1	40.00
Ireland	3	2	1	0	5	0	+5	66.67
Israel	2	1	0	1	2	1	+1	50.00
Italy	18	5	6	7	16	16	+0	27.78
Japan	1	1	0	0	1	0	+1	100.00
Luxembourg	8	8	0	0	35	3	+32	100.00
Macedonia	2	2	0	0	7	0	+7	100.00
Netherlands	29	12	7	10	29	30	−1	41.38
Norway	3	2	0	1	8	5	+3	66.67
Paraguay	1	1	0	0	3	0	+3	100.00
Poland	4	3	1	0	11	3	+8	75.00
Portugal	28	15	8	5	38	23	+15	53.57
Romania	7	5	1	1	12	5	+7	71.43
Russia	8	5	1	2	11	6	+5	62.50
Scotland	18	12	3	3	33	11	+22	66.67
Serbia	9	3	5	1	10	9	+1	33.33
Slovakia	5	4	0	1	9	3	+6	80.00
Slovenia	2	2	0	0	7	0	+7	100.00
Spain	64	23	14	27	90	96	−6	35.94
Sweden	8	5	1	2	21	10	+11	62.50
Switzerland	9	4	3	2	9	5	+4	44.44
Turkey	10	7	1	2	27	11	+16	70.00
Ukraine	4	4	0	0	12	1	+11	100.00

== Player statistics ==
Players in bold are still active with Milan

=== Most appearances ===
As of 24 January 2025.

Rank	Player	Appearances	Period
1	(Italy) Paolo Maldini	176	1985–2009
2	(Italy) Alessandro Costacurta	122	1988–2007
3	(Netherlands) Clarence Seedorf	105	2002–2012
4	(Italy) Massimo Ambrosini	104	1995–2013
4	(Italy) Gennaro Gattuso	104	1999–2012
6	(Italy) Andrea Pirlo	98	2001–2011
7	(Brazil) Dida	89	2000–2001; 2002–2010
8	(Italy) Gianni Rivera	83	1961–1979
8	(Italy) Franco Baresi	83	1978–1997
10	(Italy) Alessandro Nesta	82	2002–2012
11	(Italy) Filippo Inzaghi	77	2001–2012
11	(Ukraine) Andriy Shevchenko	77	1999–2006
13	(Italy) Mauro Tassotti	74	1981–1997
14	(Brazil) Kaká	72	2003–2009; 2013–2014
15	(Italy) Angelo Anquilletti	69	1966–1977
16	(Italy) Demetrio Albertini	67	1992–2002
16	(Brazil) Serginho	67	1999–2008
18	(Georgia (country)) Kakha Kaladze	66	2001–2010
19	(Italy) Christian Abbiati	64	1999–2005; 2009–2014
20	(Germany) Karl-Heinz Schnellinger	60	1965–1974

=== Top goalscorers ===
As of 24 January 2025.

Rank	Player	Goals	Period
1	(Italy) Filippo Inzaghi	43	2001–2011
2	(Ukraine) Andriy Shevchenko	38	1999–2006
3	(Brazil) José Altafini	32	1958–1964
4	(Brazil) Kaká	27	2003–2009; 2013–2014
5	(Netherlands) Marco van Basten	20	1988–1993
6	(Italy) Marco Simone	17	1989–1997
7	(Italy) Pierino Prati	16	1967–1973
8	(Italy) Alberto Bigon	15	1971–1979
9	(Italy) Gianni Rivera	14	1962–1972
10	(Brazil) (Italy) Angelo Sormani	13	1965–1970
10	(Italy) Luciano Chiarugi	13	1972–1976
12	(Sweden) Gunnar Nordahl	11	1950–1955
12	(Uruguay) (Italy) Juan Alberto Schiaffino	11	1955–1958
12	(Italy) Pietro Paolo Virdis	11	1985–1989
12	(Italy) Daniele Massaro	11	1989–1995
16	(Italy) Paolo Barison	10	1961–1963
16	(Netherlands) Clarence Seedorf	10	2002–2010
16	(Sweden) Zlatan Ibrahimović	10	2010–2012; 2020–2021
16	(Italy) Patrick Cutrone	10	2017–2019
16	(Portugal) Rafael Leão	10	2020–2026

== UEFA coefficient rankings ==
=== UEFA club coefficient ranking ===
As of 3 August 2026

Rank	Team	Points
22	(Spain) Real Betis	63.500
23	(Netherlands) PSV Eindhoven	61.250
24	(Italy) Milan	59.000
25	(England) Manchester United	58.500
26	(Germany) Freiburg	56.500

=== UEFA ranking since 2004 ===
As of 3 August 2026

Season	Ranking	Movement	Points	Change
2025–26	30	▼ -11	66.000	▼ -12.000
2024–25	19	▲ +10	78.000	▲ +19.000
2023–24	29	▲ +8	59.000	▲ +9.000
2022–23	37	▲ +8	50.000	▲ +12.000
2021–22	45	▲ +8	38.000	▲ +7.000
2020–21	53	▲ +28	31.000	▲ +14.000
2019–20	81	▼ –3	19.000	0.000
2018–19	78	▼ –25	19.000	▼ –9.000
2017–18	53	▼ –12	28.000	▼ –5.000
2016–17	41	▼ –16	33.000	▼ –20.000
2015–16	25	▼ –3	53.000	▼ –16.000
2014–15	22	▼ –11	69.000	▼ –16.000
2013–14	11	▲ +3	85.000	▲ +4.000
2012–13	14	▼ –2	81.000	▲ +3.000
2011–12	12	▼ –2	78.000	▼ –4.000
2010–11	10	▼ –1	82.000	▼ –5.000
2009–10	9	▼ –4	87.000	▼ –11.000
2008–09	5	▼ –3	98.000	▼ –2.000
2007–08	2	▼ –1	100.000	▼ –12.000
2006–07	1	0	112.000	▲ +5.000
2005–06	1	▲ +2	107.000	▲ +6.000
2004–05	3	0	101.000	0.000

=== Football club Elo ranking ===
As of 3 August 2026

Rank	Team	Points
34	(Norway) Bodø/Glimt	1746
35	(France) RC Lens	1745
36	(Italy) Milan	1744
37	(Saudi Arabia) Al Hilal SFC	1743
38	(Spain) Real Betis	1742

=== Football club Elo ranking since 2004 ===
As of 3 August 2026

Season	Ranking	Movement	Points	Change
2025–26	34	▼ -14	1744	▼ -74
2024–25	22	▼ -9	1808	▼ -31
2023–24	13	▲ +1	1839	▲ +9
2022–23	14	0	1830	▼ –3
2021–22	14	▲ +8	1833	▲ +30
2020–21	22	▲ +35	1803	▲ +131
2019–20	57	▼ –13	1672	▼ –38
2018–19	44	▼ –7	1710	▼ –13
2017–18	37	▲ +19	1723	▲ +45
2016–17	56	▲ +6	1678	▲ +7
2015–16	62	▼ –11	1671	▼ –25
2014–15	51	▼ –18	1696	▼ –23
2013–14	33	▼ –11	1719	▼ –60
2012–13	22	▼ –7	1779	▼ –18
2011–12	15	▲ +3	1797	▲ +8
2010–11	18	▲ +1	1789	▲ +2
2009–10	19	▼ –3	1787	▼ –32
2008–09	16	▼ –2	1819	▼ –4
2007–08	14	▼ –7	1823	▼ –60
2006–07	7	▼ –5	1883	▼ –66
2005–06	2	▲ +1	1949	▲ +48
2004–05	3	▲ +4	1901	▲ +47

== Honours ==
European and worldwide honours of AC Milan
Honour	No.	Years
European Cup / UEFA Champions League	7	1963, 1969, 1989, 1990, 1994, 2003, 2007
European Super Cup / UEFA Super Cup	5	1989, 1990, 1994, 2003, 2007
European / UEFA Cup Winners' Cup	2	1968, 1973
Latin Cup	2	1951, 1956
Mitropa Cup	1	1982
Intercontinental Cup	3	1969, 1989, 1990
FIFA Club World Cup	1	2007
