= Gaudino =

Gaudino is an Italian surname. Notable people with the surname include:

- Alex Gaudino (born 1970), Italian DJ
- Gianluca Gaudino (born 1996), German footballer
- Giuseppe M. Gaudino (born 1957), Italian director, screenwriter, documentarist
- James L. Gaudino, American academic administrator
- Juan Gaudino (1893–1975), Argentine racecar driver
- Luciano Gaudino (born 1958), Italian footballer
- Maurizio Gaudino (born 1966), German footballer
- Robert Gaudino (1925–1974), American educator
