= 1959–60 AC Milan season =

Milan Associazione Calcio
1959–60 season
- President: Andrea Rizzoli
- Manager: Luigi Bonizzoni
- Stadium: San Siro
- Serie A: 3rd
- Coppa Italia: Second round
- European Cup: Round of 16
- Coppa dell'Amicizia 1959: Winners
- Coppa dell'Amicizia 1960: Winners
- Top goalscorer: League: José Altafini (20); All: José Altafini (28)
- Average home league attendance: 29,152
Home colours	Away colours

During the 1959–60 season Associazione Calcio Milan competed in Serie A, Coppa Italia and European Cup.

== Summary ==
In the 1959-1960 season the Rossoneri, still led by Luigi Bonizzoni as coach, exchanged goalkeepers with Genoa: Lorenzo Buffon was in fact sold to the Ligurian club in exchange for Giorgio Ghezzi. Milan ended the championship in third place, with 44 points, nine behind Serie A champions Juventus and ahead of second-placed Fiorentina. Among the positive results of the season was the 5–3 win against Inter, where José Altafini became the first and only player to have scored four goals in a Milan derby.

In the Coppa Italia, Milan were eliminated in the second round by Como thanks to a 0–1 defeat at home.

The campaign in the European Cup was also short: following the victory in the first round against Olympiakos (2–2 in Greece and 3–1 at San Siro), Milan were beaten 7–1 on aggregate by Barcelona in the round of 16.

At the end of the season, Juan Alberto Schiaffino left the club after six years with the Rossoneri.

== Squad ==
Note: Flags indicate national team as defined under FIFA eligibility rules; some limited exceptions apply. Players may hold more than one non-FIFA nationality.

Pos.	Nation	Player
GK	ITA	Luciano Alfieri
GK	ITA	Lorenzo Buffon
GK	ITA	Giorgio Ghezzi
GK	ITA	Bruno Ducati
GK	ITA	Giancarlo Gallesi
DF	ITA	Cesare Maldini
DF	ITA	Gilberto Noletti
DF	ITA	Enrico Bergonti
DF	ITA	Sandro Salvadore
DF	ITA	Giovanni Trapattoni
DF	ITA	Benedetto De Angelis
DF	ITA	Luigi Garagna
DF	ITA	Mario Trebbi
DF	ITA	Francesco Zagatti
MF	ITA	Giancarlo Bacci
MF	ITA	Sergio Bettini

Pos.	Nation	Player
MF	SWE	Nils Liedholm (Captain)
MF	ITA	Alfio Fontana
MF	ARG	Ernesto Grillo
MF	ITA	Vincenzo Occhetta
MF	ITA	Ambrogio Pelagalli
MF	ITA	Cesare Reina
MF	ITA	Juan Alberto Schiaffino (Vice-captain)
FW	BRA	José Altafini
FW	ITA	Gastone Bean
FW	ITA	Giancarlo Danova
FW	ITA	Carlo Galli
FW	ITA	Paolo Ferrario
FW	ITA	Giorgio Fogar
FW	ITA	Mario Bresolin
FW	ITA	Gianni Meanti

=== Transfers ===
In
Pos.	Name	from	Type
FW	Sergio Bettini	Monfalcone	-
FW	Mario Bresolin	Triestina	-
MF	Benedetto De Angelis	Genoa	-
FW	Giorgio Fogar	Monfalcone	-
GK	Giancarlo Gallesi	Vigevano	-
GK	Giorgio Ghezzi	Genoa	-
FW	Gianni Meanti	Crema	-

Out
Pos.	Name	To	Type
MF	Eros Beraldo	Genoa	-
GK	Lorenzo Buffon	Genoa	-
MF	Vittorino Mantovani	Triestina	-
FW	Gianni Meanti	Cagliari	-
MF	Giancarlo Migliavacca	Alessandria	-
DF	Luigi Radice	Triestina	-
GK	Narciso Soldan	Torino	-

== Competitions ==
=== Serie A ===
==== League table ====
Pos	Team	Pld	W	D	L	GF	GA	GD	Pts	Qualification or relegation
1	Juventus (C)	34	25	5	4	92	33	+59	55	Qualified for the European Cup
2	Fiorentina	34	20	7	7	68	31	+37	47	Qualified for the Cup Winners' Cup
3	Milan	34	17	10	7	56	37	+19	44	
4	Internazionale	34	14	12	8	55	43	+12	40	Invited for the Inter-Cities Fairs Cup
5	Bologna	34	14	8	12	50	42	+8	36	

Source: Panini
(C) Champions

==== Matches ====
20 September 1959 1	Alessandria	3–1	Milan	Alessandria
	Tacchi 11', 50', 86'		39' Altafini	Stadium: Stadio Giuseppe Moccagatta; Attendance: 20,000; Referee: Lo Bello

27 September 1959 2	Milan	1–1	Roma	Milan
	Fontana 23'		1' Zaglio	Stadium: Stadio San Siro; Attendance: 25,000; Referee: Gambarotta

4 October 1959 3	Lanerossi Vicenza	1–2	Milan	Vicenza
	Savoini 15'		11' Altafini; 77' Danova	Stadium: Stadio Romeo Menti; Attendance: 15,000; Referee: Jonni

11 October 1959 4	Milan	3–1	Napoli	Milan
	Galli 13'; Schiaffino 19'; Bertucco 73' (o.g.)		89' Del Vecchio	Stadium: Stadio San Siro; Attendance: 40,000; Referee: Rigato

18 October 1959 5	Genoa	0–2	Milan	Genoa
			55' Schiaffino; 64' Danova	Stadium: Stadio Luigi Ferraris; Attendance: 25,000; Referee: Marchese

25 October 1959 6	Milan	3–1	Udinese	Milan
	Altafini 10', 60'; Bean 31'		80' Bettini	Stadium: Stadio San Siro; Attendance: 25,000; Referee: Cariani

8 November 1959 7	Inter Milan	0–0	Milan	Milan
				Stadium: Stadio San Siro; Attendance: 77,500; Referee: Jonni

15 November 1959 8	Padova	2–0	Milan	Padova
	Brighenti 29'; Tortul 33'			Stadium: Stadio Silvio Appiani; Attendance: 15,000; Referee: Lo Bello

22 November 1959 9	Milan	2–0	Bari	Milan
	Bean 31'; Danova 85'			Stadium: Stadio San Siro; Attendance: 25,000; Referee: Rigato

6 December 1959 10	Fiorentina	1–1	Milan	Florence
	Lojacono 64'		62' Altafini	Stadium: Stadio Comunale; Attendance: 32,000; Referee: Marchese

13 December 1959 11	Milan	0–0	Palermo	Milan
				Stadium: Stadio San Siro; Attendance: 9,000; Referee: Sbardella

20 December 1959 12	Milan	4–0	Sampdoria	Milan
	Danova 9', 35'; Altafini 61'; Bean 75'			Stadium: Stadio San Siro; Attendance: 25,000; Referee: Francescon

27 December 1959 13	Lazio	0–1	Milan	Rome
			8' Bean	Stadium: Stadio Olimpico; Attendance: 35,000; Referee: Lo Bello

10 January 1960 14	Milan	0–2	Juventus	Milan
			50' Stacchini; 74' Cervato	Stadium: Stadio San Siro; Attendance: 85,074; Referee: Adami

17 January 1960 15	Bologna	0–3	Milan	Bologna
			34' Grillo; 40' (pen.) Liedholm; 87' Bean	Stadium: Stadio Renato Dall'Ara; Attendance: 19,000; Referee: Lo Bello

24 January 1960 16	SPAL	0–3	Milan	Ferrara
			19', 54' Altafini; 79' (pen.) Liedholm	Stadium: Stadio Comunale; Attendance: 20,000; Referee: Bonetto

31 January 1960 17	Milan	2–1	Atalanta	Milan
	Galli 12'; Grillo 33'		9' Maschio	Stadium: Stadio San Siro; Attendance: 27,000; Referee: Mori

7 February 1960 18	Milan	3–1	Alessandria	Milan
	Pedroni 16' (o.g.); Galli 26'; Altafini 63'		86' Rivera	Stadium: Stadio San Siro; Attendance: 10,000; Referee: Francescon

14 February 1960 19	Roma	2–2	Milan	Rome
	David 32'; Orlando 53'		86' Danova; 43' Altafini	Stadium: Stadio Olimpico; Attendance: 24,022; Referee: Jonni

21 February 1960 20	Milan	2–0	Lanerossi Vicenza	Milan
	Bean 10'; Grillo 69'			Stadium: Stadio San Siro; Attendance: 18,000; Referee: Roversi

28 February 1960 21	Napoli	1–1	Milan	Naples
	Vinicio 12'		63' Danova	Stadium: Stadio San Paolo; Attendance: 65,000; Referee: Rigato

6 March 1960 22	Milan	2–1	Genoa	Milan
	Bean 14'; Altafini 29'		74' Piquè	Stadium: Stadio San Siro; Attendance: 17,000; Referee: Orlandini

20 March 1960 23	Udinese	2–2	Milan	Udine
	Bettini 26'; Canella 74'		20', 84' Altafini	Stadium: Stadio Moretti; Attendance: 15,000; Referee: Lo Bello

27 March 1960 24	Milan	5–3	Inter Milan	Milan
	Altafini 3', 16', 40', 54'; Galli 22'		43' Rancati; 74' Mereghetti; 82' Angelillo	Stadium: Stadio San Siro; Attendance: 72,000; Referee: Jonni

3 April 1960 25	Milan	3–2	Padova	Milan
	Grillo 6'; Galli 24'; Liedholm 74' (pen.)		35' Perani; 89' (pen.) Brighenti	Stadium: Stadio San Siro; Attendance: 30,000; Referee: Marchese

10 April 1960 26	Bari	3–0	Milan	Bari
	Erba 8', 34'; Catalano 86'			Stadium: Stadio della Vittoria; Attendance: 45,000; Referee: Orlandini

17 April 1960 27	Milan	0–0	Fiorentina	Milan
				Stadium: Stadio San Siro; Attendance: 40,000; Referee: Lo Bello

24 April 1960 28	Palermo	1–0	Milan	Palermo
	Vernazza 65' (pen.)			Stadium: Stadio La Favorita; Attendance: 25,000; Referee: Adami

1 May 1960 29	Sampdoria	2–1	Milan	Genoa
	Toschi 17'; Cucchiaroni 60'		65' (o.g.) Bernasconi	Stadium: Stadio Luigi Ferraris; Attendance: 18,000; Referee: Di Tonno

8 May 1960 30	Milan	1–0	Lazio	Milan
	Bean 88'			Stadium: Stadio San Siro; Attendance: 15,000; Referee: Liverani

15 May 1960 31	Juventus	3–1	Milan	Turin
	Sivori 55', 75'; Boniperti 81'		56' Altafini	Stadium: Stadio Comunale; Attendance: 60,000; Referee: Rigato

22 May 1960 32	Milan	2–2	Bologna	Milan
	Galli 7'; Altafini 52'		56' Demarco; 76' Campana	Stadium: Stadio San Siro; Attendance: 20,000; Referee: Francescon

29 May 1960 33	Milan	3–1	SPAL	Milan
	Altafini 21'; Danova 36', 60'		9' Novelli	Stadium: Stadio San Siro; Attendance: 10,000; Referee: Samani

5 June 1960 34	Atalanta	0–0	Milan	Bergamo
				Stadium: Stadio Comunale; Attendance: 10,000; Referee: De Marchi

=== Coppa Italia ===
==== Second round ====
16 September 1959 1	Milan	0–1	Como	Milan
			90+2' Bellini	Stadium: Arena Civica; Attendance: 3,000; Referee: Mori

=== European Cup ===
==== Preliminary round ====
13 September 1959 1	Olympiacos	2–2	Milan	Athens
	Papazoglu 19'; Yfantīs 44'		33', 76' Altafini	Stadium: Karaiskakis Stadium; Attendance: 25,000; Referee: Seipelt

23 September 1959 2	Milan	3–1	Olympiacos	Milan
	Danova 13', 27', 85'		68' Yfantīs	Stadium: Stadio San Siro; Attendance: 40,000; Referee: Steiner

==== Round of 16 ====
4 November 1959 1	Milan	0–2	Barcelona	Milan
			12' Vergés; 15' Suárez	Stadium: Stadio San Siro; Attendance: 45,000; Referee: Mori

25 November 1959 2	Barcelona	5–1	Milan	Barcelona
	Martinez 8'; Segarra 18'; Kubala 33', 68'; Czibor 64'		37' Ferrario	Stadium: Camp Nou; Attendance: 75,000; Referee: Guigne

=== Coppa dell'Amicizia ===
==== Coppa dell'Amicizia 1959 ====
9 September 1959 2	Milan	4–0	Nice	Milan
	Altafini 11', 55'; Grillo 20', 36'			Stadium: Stadio San Siro; Attendance: 30,000; Referee: Lequesne

==== Coppa dell'Amicizia 1960 ====
12 June 1960 1	Milan	6–3	Toulouse	Milan
	Altafini 11', 65', 73'; Ferrario 46'; Liedholm 55'; Danova 63'		33', 60' Shultz; 85' Boucher	Stadium: Stadio San Siro; Attendance: 10,000; Referee: Lequesne

19 June 1960 2	Toulouse	0–2	Milan	Toulouse
			35' (pen.) Liedholm; 68' Altafini	Stadium: Stadium Municipal; Attendance: 7,000; Referee: Rigato

== Statistics ==
=== Squad statistics ===
Competition	Points	Home						Away						Total						GD
Competition	Points	G	W	D	L	Gs	Ga	G	W	D	L	Gs	Ga	G	W	D	L	Gs	Ga	GD
1959-60 Serie A	44	17	12	4	1	36	16	17	5	6	6	20	21	34	17	10	7	56	37	+19
1959-60 Coppa Italia	–	1	0	0	1	0	1	0	0	0	0	0	0	1	0	0	1	0	1	-1
1959 and 1960 Coppa dell'Amicizia	–	2	2	0	0	10	3	1	1	0	0	2	0	3	3	0	0	12	3	+9
1959-60 European Cup	–	2	1	0	1	3	3	2	0	1	1	3	7	4	1	1	2	10	5	-4
Total	–	22	15	4	3	49	23	20	5	7	7	25	28	42	21	11	10	74	51	+23

=== Players statistics ===
No.	Pos	Nat	Player	Total		Serie A		Coppa Italia		Coppa dell'Amicizia		European Cup	
No.	Pos	Nat	Player	Apps	Goals	Apps	Goals	Apps	Goals	Apps	Goals	Apps	Goals
	GK	(Italy) ITA	Giorgio Ghezzi	21	-22	18	-17	0	0	2	-3	1	-2
	GK	(Italy) ITA	Bruno Ducati	0	0	0	0	0	0	0	0	0	0
	GK	(Italy) ITA	Lorenzo Buffon	1	-1	0	0	1	-1	0	0	0	0
	GK	(Italy) ITA	Giancarlo Gallesi	6	-9	4	-6	0	0	0	0	2	-3
	GK	(Italy) ITA	Luciano Alfieri	13	-19	12	-14	0	0	0	0	1	-5
	DF	(Italy) ITA	Cesare Maldini	34	0	29	0	0	0	1	0	4	0
	DF	(Italy) ITA	Gilberto Noletti	1	0	1	0	0	0	0	0	0	0
	FW	(Italy) ITA	Gastone Bean	30	8	25	8	0	0	1	0	4	0
	FW	(Italy) ITA	Giancarlo Danova	27	13	21	9	0	0	3	1	3	3
	MF	(Sweden) SWE	Nils Liedholm	35	5	28	3	0	0	3	2	4	0
	DF	(Italy) ITA	Francesco Zagatti	23	0	19	0	0	0	1	0	3	0
	DF	(Italy) ITA	Benedetto De Angelis	17	0	14	0	0	0	2	0	1	0
	FW	(Brazil) BRA	José Altafini	40	28	33	20	0	0	3	6	4	2
	FW	(Italy) ITA	Giorgio Fogar	7	0	5	0	1	0	1	0	0	0
	FW	(Italy) ITA	Carlo Galli	30	6	25	6	0	0	3	0	2	0
	FW	(Italy) ITA	Paolo Ferrario	9	2	5	0	1	0	2	1	1	1
	FW	(Italy) ITA	Gianni Meanti	1	0	0	0	1	0	0	0	0	0
	FW	(Italy) ITA	Mario Bresolin	1	0	0	0	1	0	0	0	0	0
	MF	(Italy) ITA	Giancarlo Bacci	6	0	4	0	0	0	1	0	1	0
	MF	(Italy) ITA	Vincenzo Occhetta	34	0	27	0	1	0	2	0	4	0
	MF	(Italy) ITA	Ambrogio Pelagalli	1	0	1	0	0	0	0	0	0	0
	MF	(Italy) ITA	Cesare Reina	2	0	1	0	1	0	0	0	0	0
	MF	(Italy) ITA	Juan Alberto Schiaffino	22	2	20	2	0	0	1	0	1	0
	MF	(Italy) ITA	Ernesto Grillo	26	6	22	4	0	0	1	2	3	0
	MF	(Italy) ITA	Alfio Fontana	37	1	32	1	0	0	1	0	4	0
	DF	(Italy) ITA	Luigi Garagna	1	0	1	0	0	0	0	0	0	0
	DF	(Italy) ITA	Mario Trebbi	15	0	12	0	1	0	2	0	0	0
	DF	(Italy) ITA	Enrico Bergonti	1	0	0	0	1	0	0	0	0	0
	MF	(Italy) ITA	Sergio Bettini	10	0	8	0	1	0	1	0	0	0
	DF	(Italy) ITA	Sandro Salvadore	8	0	5	0	1	0	1	0	1	0
	MF	(Italy) ITA	Giovanni Trapattoni	5	0	2	0	1	0	2	0	0	0

== See also ==
- AC Milan

== Bibliography ==
- Almanacco illustrato del Milan, ed: 2, March 2005. Panini.
- Enrico Tosi. La storia del Milan, May 2005. Italia/Italy cid Tosi.
- Milan. Sempre con te, December 2009. Mondadori. 2009. ISBN 978-88-04-59118-4.
