= 1977–78 AC Milan season =

Milan Associazione Calcio
1977–78 season
- President: Felice Colombo
- Manager: Nils Liedholm
- Stadium: San Siro
- Serie A: 4th
- Coppa Italia: Second round
- Cup Winners' Cup: Round of 32
- Top goalscorer: League: Aldo Maldera (8); All: Aldo Maldera (8)
- Average home league attendance: 48,907
Home colours	Away colours

During the 1977–1978 season Milan Associazione Calcio competed in Serie A, Coppa Italia and Cup Winners' Cup.

== Summary ==
Entrepreneur Felice Colombo became president of the club before the end of the previous season, while Nils Liedholm was signed as manager, after having been already a Milan player from 1949 to 1961 and coach from 1963 to 1966. Notable purchases include Ruben Buriani and Roberto Antonelli.

In the league, Milan started with ten consecutive games without defeats (four draws and six wins) which brought them to the first place in the standings. The subsequent series of three defeats and two draws meant that the Rossoneri ended the first half of the season in fourth place with 18 points, together with Inter and Perugia. In the second half of the season, Milan suffered only two defeats against Atalanta and Lazio, in both cases at San Siro, and finished the championship in fourth position with 37 points, a placement that allowed the club to qualify to the 1978-79 UEFA Cup. During the tournament, on 23 April 1978 in Verona, Franco Baresi made his debut with Milan. He would become a legend of the club in the following two decades.

In the Cup Winners' Cup, Milan was eliminated in the round of 32 by the Spanish side Betis Seville who won 2–0 in Spain and lost the second leg 2–1 in Milan.

The season ended with the Coppa Italia, a competition that Milan, as holders of the trophy, started from the second round. Milan closed group B, which also included Taranto, Juventus and Napoli, in first place, on equal points with the latter; Napoli qualified for the final thanks to a better goal difference against Milan (+8 against +6).

== Squad ==
Note: Flags indicate national team as defined under FIFA eligibility rules; some limited exceptions apply. Players may hold more than one non-FIFA nationality.

Pos.	Nation	Player
GK	ITA	Enrico Albertosi
GK	ITA	Antonio Rigamonti
DF	ITA	Aldo Bet
DF	ITA	Franco Baresi
DF	ITA	Simone Boldini
DF	ITA	Fulvio Collovati
DF	ITA	Maurizio Turone
DF	ITA	Giuseppe Sabadini
DF	ITA	Aldo Maldera
MF	ITA	Fabio Capello
MF	ITA	Giorgio Biasiolo
MF	ITA	Ruben Buriani

Pos.	Nation	Player
MF	ITA	Gianni Rivera (Captain)
MF	ITA	Gabriello Carotti
MF	ITA	Giorgio Morini
FW	ITA	Giorgio Braglia
FW	ITA	Roberto Antonelli
FW	ITA	Alberto Bigon (vice-captain)
FW	ITA	Egidio Calloni
FW	ITA	Luciano Gaudino
FW	ITA	Giovanni Sartori
FW	ITA	Ugo Tosetto
FW	ITA	Sergio Valentinuzzi
FW	ITA	Francesco Vincenzi

== Transfers ==
In
Pos.	Name	from	Type
DF	Franco Fasoli	Monza	loan end
MF	Ruben Buriani	Monza	
FW	Roberto Antonelli	Monza	
FW	Luciano Gaudino	Varese	loan end
FW	Ugo Tosetto	Monza	
FW	Giovanni Sartori	Bolzano	loan end

Out
Pos.	Name	To	Type
DF	Angelo Anquilletti	Monza	
DF	Franco Fasoli	Bari	
MF	Duino Gorin	Monza	
MF	Giovanni Lorini	Lanerossi	
FW	Giovanni Sartori	Bolzano	loan
FW	Massimo Silva	Monza	
FW	Giorgio Tomba	Pro Patria	
FW	Francesco Vincenzi	Monza	
MF	Giorgio Biasiolo	Lecce	
FW	Giorgio Braglia	Foggia	

== Competitions ==
=== Serie A ===
==== League table ====
Pos	Team	Pld	W	D	L	GF	GA	GD	Pts	Qualification or relegation
2	Vicenza	30	14	11	5	50	34	+16	39	Qualification to UEFA Cup
3	Torino	30	14	11	5	36	23	+13	39	Qualification to UEFA Cup
4	Milan	30	12	13	5	38	25	+13	37	Qualification to UEFA Cup
5	Internazionale	30	13	10	7	35	24	+11	36	Qualification to Cup Winners' Cup
6	Napoli	30	8	14	8	35	31	+4	30	Qualification to UEFA Cup

Source: Panini

==== Matches ====
11 September 1977 1	Fiorentina	1–1	Milan	Florence
	Rossinelli 53'	Report	89' Calloni	Stadium: Stadio Comunale; Attendance: 50,594; Referee: Ciulli

18 September 1977 2	Milan	2–2	Genoa	Milan
	Rivera 3' (pen.); Capello 41'	Report	12', 64' (pen.) Damiani	Stadium: Stadio San Siro; Attendance: 53,164; Referee: Gonella

25 September 1977 3	Juventus	1–1	Milan	Turin
	Gentile 2'	Report	48' Maldera	Stadium: Stadio Comunale; Attendance: 59,078; Referee: Ciacci

2 October 1977 4	Milan	3–1	Lanerossi Vicenza	Milan
	Turone 2'; Maldera 45', 50'	Report	59' (pen.) Rossi	Stadium: Stadio San Siro; Attendance: 42,313; Referee: Benedetti

23 October 1977 5	Roma	1–2	Milan	Rome
	Chinellato 4'	Report	18' Bigon; 84' Capello	Stadium: Stadio Olimpico; Attendance: 55,677; Referee: Bergamo

30 October 1977 6	Milan	2–0	Foggia	Milan
	Rivera 12'; Maldera 63'	Report		Stadium: Stadio San Siro; Attendance: 48,346; Referee: Reggiani

6 November 1977 7	Inter Milan	1–3	Milan	Milan
	Anastasi 77'	Report	4', 84' Buriani; 51' (pen.) Rivera	Stadium: Stadio San Siro; Attendance: 78,683; Referee: Serafino

20 November 1977 8	Milan	1–0	Bologna	Milan
	Rivera 50' (pen.)	Report		Stadium: Stadio San Siro; Attendance: 50,789; Referee: Menicucci

27 November 1977 9	Pescara	0–2	Milan	Pescara
		Report		Stadium: Stadio Adriatico; Attendance: 28,458; Referee: Gonella

11 December 1977 10	Milan	2–2	Perugia	Milan
	Maldera 38'; Rivera 85' (pen.)	Report	13' Novellino; 34' Speggiorin	Stadium: Stadio San Siro; Attendance: 54,956; Referee: Agnolin

18 December 1977 11	Torino	1–0	Milan	Turin
	Pulici 62'	Report		Stadium: Stadio Comunale; Attendance: 51,616; Referee: Menegali

31 December 1977 12	Atalanta	1–1	Milan	Bergamo
	Bertuzzo 40'	Report	28' Rivera	Stadium: Stadio Comunale; Attendance: 34,482; Referee: Menicucci

8 January 1978 13	Milan	1–1	Hellas Verona	Milan
	Turone 87'	Report	56' Mascetti	Stadium: Stadio San Siro; Attendance: 47,609; Referee: Reggiani

15 January 1978 14	Lazio	2–0	Milan	Rome
	Boccolini 61'; Giordano 82'	Report		Stadium: Stadio Olimpico; Attendance: 42,529; Referee: Gonella

22 January 1978 15	Milan	0–1	Napoli	Milan
		Report	52' (pen.) Savoldi	Stadium: Stadio San Siro; Attendance: 53,794; Referee: Serafino

29 January 1978 16	Milan	5–1	Fiorentina	Milan
	Maldera 49'; Gaudino 54'; Antonelli 77' (pen.); Collovati 88'; Capello 90'	Report	70' Casarsa	Stadium: Stadio San Siro; Attendance: 28,702; Referee: Agnolin

5 February 1978 17	Genoa	1–1	Milan	Genoa
	Pruzzo 71'	Report	16' (o.g.) Onofri	Stadium: Stadio Luigi Ferraris; Attendance: 50,851; Referee: Michelotti

12 February 1978 18	Milan	0–0	Juventus	Milan
		Report		Stadium: Stadio San Siro; Attendance: 78,847; Referee: Bergamo

19 February 1978 19	Lanerossi Vicenza	1–1	Milan	Vicenza
	Guidetti 42'	Report	9' Bigon	Stadium: Stadio Romeo Menti; Attendance: 30,457; Referee: Gonella

26 February 1978 20	Milan	1–0	Roma	Milan
	Di Bartolomei 65' (o.g.)	Report		Stadium: Stadio San Siro; Attendance: 33,914; Referee: Prati

5 March 1978 21	Foggia	1–2	Milan	Foggia
	Turone 18' (o.g.)	Report	49' Calloni; 78' Antonelli	Stadium: Stadio Pino Zaccheria; Attendance: 20,983; Referee: Michelotti

12 March 1978 22	Milan	0–0	Inter Milan	Milan
		Report		Stadium: Stadio San Siro; Attendance: 78,608; Referee: Menegali

19 March 1978 23	Bologna	0–0	Milan	Bologna
		Report		Stadium: Stadio Comunale; Attendance: 43,628; Referee: Agnolin

26 March 1978 24	Milan	2–0	Pescara	Milan
	Gaudino 35'; Maldera 70'	Report		Stadium: Stadio San Siro; Attendance: 32,279; Referee: Redini

2 April 1978 25	Perugia	0–1	Milan	Perugia
		Report	58' Maldera	Stadium: Stadio Renato Curi; Attendance: 27,306; Referee: Lattanzi

9 April 1978 26	Milan	1–1	Torino	Milan
	Bigon 9'	Report	37' (pen.) Pulici	Stadium: Stadio San Siro; Attendance: 61,324; Referee: Menicucci

16 April 1978 27	Milan	0–1	Atalanta	Milan
		Report	83' Tavola	Stadium: Stadio San Siro; Attendance: 48,657; Referee: Ciacci

23 April 1978 28	Hellas Verona	1–2	Milan	Verona
	Bet 35' (o.g.)	Report	48' Bigon; 54' (pen.) Buriani	Stadium: Stadio Marcantonio Bentegodi; Attendance: 30,134; Referee: Panzino

30 April 1978 29	Milan	0–2	Lazio	Milan
		Report		Stadium: Stadio San Siro; Attendance: 33,445; Referee: Michelotti

7 May 1978 30	Napoli	1–1	Milan	Naples
	Vinazzani 85'	Report	74' Bigon	Stadium: Stadio San Paolo; Attendance: 63,269; Referee: Menicucci

=== Coppa Italia ===
==== Second round group B ====
Pos	Team	Pld	W	D	L	GF	GA	GD	Pts
1	Napoli(A)	6	3	2	1	10	2	+8	8
2	Milan(A)	6	3	2	1	11	5	+6	8
3	Juventus(A)	6	2	1	3	7	14	−7	5
4	Taranto(B)	6	0	3	3	3	10	−7	3

4 May 1978 1	Taranto	1–1	Milan	Taranto
	Turini 39'		71' Valentinuzzi	Stadium: Stadio Salinella; Attendance: 24,735; Referee: Lanese

17 May 1978 2	Juventus	0–3	Milan	Turin
			56' Calloni; 72' Rivera; 76' Sartori	Stadium: Stadio Comunale; Attendance: 4,500; Referee: Ciulli

21 May 1978 3	Milan	1–1	Napoli	Verona
	Sartori 76'		27' Savoldi	Stadium: Stadio Marcantonio Bentegodi; Attendance: 7,249; Referee: Ciulli

24 May 1978 4	Milan	2–0	Taranto	Modena
	Sartori 1', 35'			Stadium: Stadio Alberto Braglia; Attendance: 22,000; Referee: Colasanti

1 June 1978 5	Napoli	1–0	Milan	Naples
	Savoldi 77'			Stadium: Stadio San Paolo; Attendance: 22,582; Referee: Longhi

4 June 1978 6	Milan	4–2	Juventus	Milan
	Bigon 26', 67'; Sartori 45'; Buriani 59' (pen.)		73' Bozzi; 80' Schincaglia	Stadium: Stadio San Siro; Attendance: 5,991; Referee: Reggiani

=== Cup Winners' Cup ===
==== Round of 32 ====
14 September 1977 1	Real Betis	2–0	Milan	Seville
	García Soriano 13'; Eulate 71'			Stadium: Estadio Benito Villamarín; Attendance: 45,000; Referee: Kitabdjian

28 September 1977 2	Milan	2–1	Real Betis	Milan
	Tosetto 35'; Capello 59'		62' López	Stadium: Stadio San Siro; Attendance: 58,767; Referee: Cebe

== Statistics ==
=== Squad statistics ===
Competition	Points	Home						Away						Total						GD
Competition	Points	G	W	D	L	Gs	Ga	G	W	D	L	Gs	Ga	G	W	D	L	Gs	Ga	GD
1977-78 Serie A	37	15	6	6	3	20	12	15	6	7	2	18	13	30	12	13	5	38	25	+13
1977-78 Coppa Italia	–	3	2	1	0	7	3	3	1	1	1	4	2	6	3	2	1	11	5	+6
1977–78 Cup Winners' Cup	–	1	1	0	0	2	1	1	0	0	1	0	2	2	1	0	1	2	3	−1
Total	–	19	9	7	3	29	16	19	7	8	4	22	17	38	16	15	7	51	33	+18

=== Players statistics ===
No.	Pos	Nat	Player	Total		Serie A		Coppa Italia		Cup Winners' Cup	
No.	Pos	Nat	Player	Apps	Goals	Apps	Goals	Apps	Goals	Apps	Goals
	DF	(Italy) ITA	Franco Baresi	3	0	1	0	2	0	0	0
	DF	(Italy) ITA	Aldo Bet	32	0	25	0	6	0	1	0
	GK	(Italy) ITA	Enrico Albertosi	32	-27	30	-24	0	-0	2	-3
	DF	(Italy) ITA	Giuseppe Sabadini	21	0	15	0	5	0	1	0
	GK	(Italy) ITA	Antonio Rigamonti	7	-6	1	-1	6	-5	0	-0
	MF	(Italy) ITA	Giorgio Biasiolo	1	0	0	0	0	0	1	0
	MF	(Italy) ITA	Ruben Buriani	33	4	26	3	5	1	2	0
	MF	(Italy) ITA	Fabio Capello	35	4	28	3	5	0	2	1
	DF	(Italy) ITA	Simone Boldini	13	0	6	0	6	0	1	0
	FW	(Italy) ITA	Alberto Bigon	30	7	23	5	6	2	1	0
	DF	(Italy) ITA	Fulvio Collovati	30	1	25	1	4	0	1	0
	MF	(Italy) ITA	Gianni Rivera	36	7	30	6	5	1	1	0
	DF	(Italy) ITA	Maurizio Turone	29	2	24	2	3	0	2	0
	FW	(Italy) ITA	Giorgio Braglia	0	0	0	0	0	0	0	0
	MF	(Italy) ITA	Gabriello Carotti	4	0	1	0	3	0	0	0
	MF	(Italy) ITA	Giorgio Morini	33	0	26	0	5	0	2	0
	DF	(Italy) ITA	Aldo Maldera	30	8	28	8	0	0	2	0
	FW	(Italy) ITA	Roberto Antonelli	17	2	14	2	1	0	2	0
	FW	(Italy) ITA	Egidio Calloni	25	3	21	2	2	1	2	0
	FW	(Italy) ITA	Luciano Gaudino	13	2	10	2	3	0	0	0
	FW	(Italy) ITA	Giovanni Sartori	5	5	0	0	5	5	0	0
	FW	(Italy) ITA	Ugo Tosetto	27	1	22	0	3	0	2	1
	FW	(Italy) ITA	Sergio Valentinuzzi	1	1	0	0	1	1	0	0

== See also ==
- AC Milan

== Bibliography ==
- Almanacco illustrato del Milan, ed: 2, March 2005. Panini.
- Enrico Tosi. La storia del Milan, May 2005. Italia/Italy cid Tosi.
- Milan. Sempre con te, December 2009. Mondadori. 2009. ISBN 978-88-04-59118-4.
