= Baudino =

Baudino is an Italian surname. Notable people with the surname include:

- Gael Baudino (born 1955), American fantasy author
- Lucrezia Baudino (born 2001), Italian rower
- Stefano Baudino (born 1963), Italian cyclist

== See also ==
- Gaudino
