= Ugo Tosetto =

Italian footballer

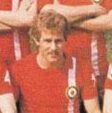

Personal information
- Date of birth: August 1, 1953 (age 73)
- Place of birth: Cittadella, Italy
- Height: 1.69 m (5 ft 6 1/2 in)
- Position: Midfielder

Youth career
- Olympia Cittadella
- 1967–1970: SPAL

Senior career*
Years	Team	Apps	(Gls)
1971–1972	SPAL	5	(0)
1972–1975	Solbiatese	107	(21)
1975&–1977	Monza	70	(27)
1977–1978	Milan	22	(0)
1978–1979	Avellino	20	(0)
1979–1980	Monza	18	(1)
1980–1981	L.R. Vicenza	20	(1)
1981–1982	Modena	27	(3)
1982–1983	Benevento	18	(2)
1983–1984	Rimini	15	(2)
1984–1986	Iris Borgoticino	?	(24)
1986–1987	Oleggio	?	(1)
- Mirago
- * Club domestic league appearances and goals

Ugo Tosetto (born August 1, 1953 in Cittadella) is a retired Italian professional football player.

== Career ==
Tosetto began playing football with lower-level sides SPAL, Solbiatese and Monza. He scored 27 goals for Monza in the two seasons he played for them, first leading them to promotion to Serie B and then narrowly missing out on promotion to Serie A. He was bought by Milan after that season, where he would make his Serie A debut against Fiorentina on 11 September 1977. He did not score any league goals in the season he played for the club, his only Milan goal was the one he scored in the 1977–78 European Cup Winners' Cup game against Real Betis. In total, Tosetto played 2 seasons (42 games, no goals) in the Serie A for A.C. Milan and Avellino.

https://www.footballweb.it/gli-ex-del-calcio-ugo-tosetto-il-mio-piu-grande-rammarico-non-aver-segnato-un-gol-con-la-maglia-dellavellino/
