= Robert Gaudino =

American academic

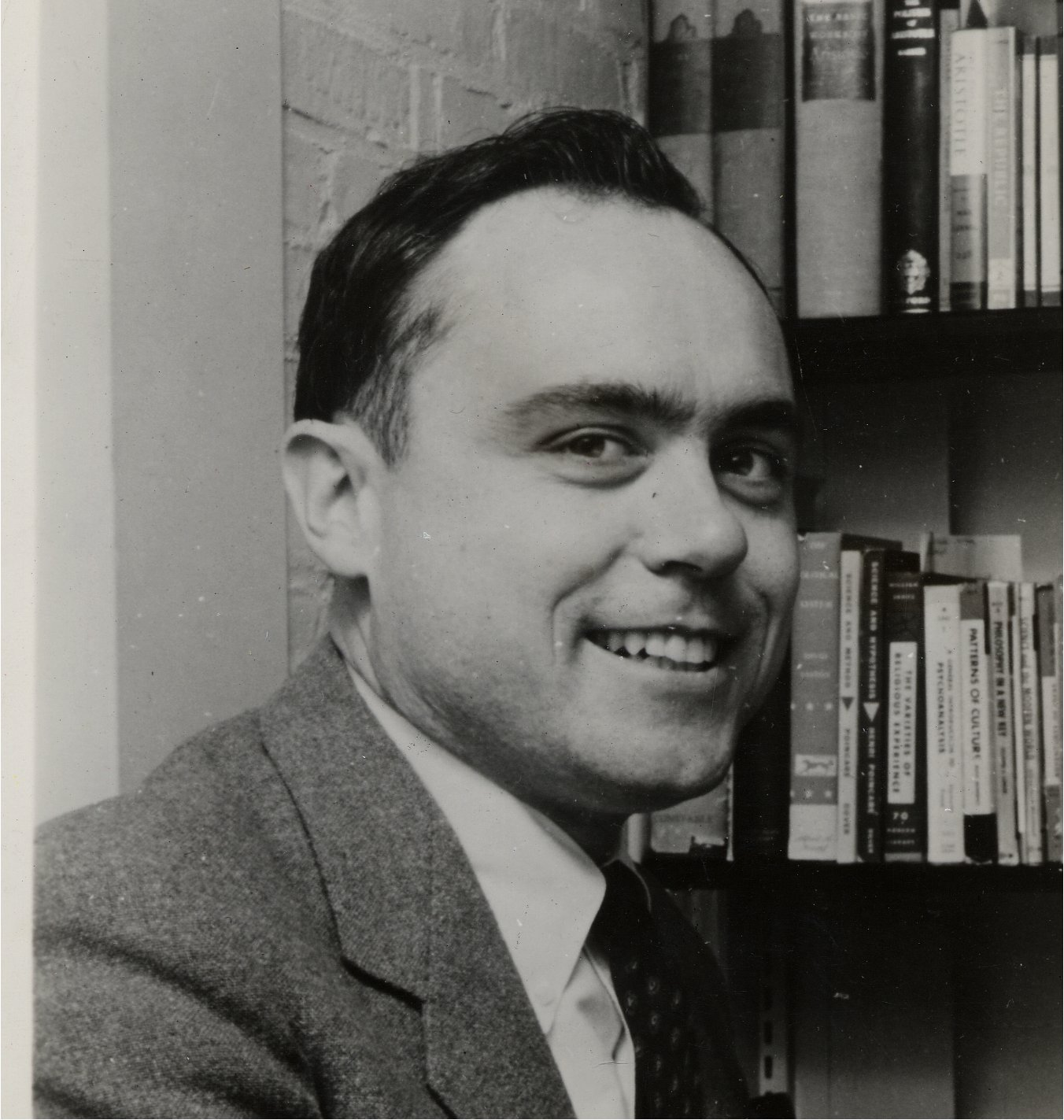
- Born: Robert Lee Gaudino; 1925; California, US
- Died: November 28, 1974

Academic background
- Education: University of Chicago (PhD)

Academic work
- Discipline: Political science, educational theory
- Institutions: Williams College

Robert Lee Gaudino (1925 – November 28, 1974) was an American political scientist and educational theorist who worked as a professor of political science at Williams College from 1955 until his death in 1974, also serving as the Peace Corps training director at Williams.

== Life ==
Gaudino served in the US Army Air Corps from 1943 to 1946. He completed a Ph.D. at the University of Chicago in 1955, with a dissertation focused on the issue of academic freedom.

He died on November 28, 1974 of a neurological disease.

== Teaching ==
Gaudino was "arguably the greatest Williams College educator of the 20th century."

A popular teacher beloved by students for his engaging, personal enthusiasm that extended far beyond the confines of the classroom --- the oft repeated maxim goes, "he did not have students but disciples" --- he held very strict ideas about classroom decorum, addressing his students by their last names, insisting that they come to class on time and that they be prepared to be called upon at any time to enter into a Socratic-style dialogue related to the day's reading.

== Books ==
Gaudino wrote The Indian University (1965) concerning the university system in India.

Gaudino argued that Williams should "actively promote a range of experiences that have the creative potential to unsettle and disturb" as part of a program of "uncomfortable learning" based on the "unsettling experience." He published this theory in a second book, The Uncomfortable Learning (1974).

== Works inspired by Gaudino ==
The Williams College Resettling Refugee in Main Programme is inspired by Gaudino's project Williams at Home, while the Club for Uncomfortable Learning at Bard College was also inspired by Gaudino's work.

A memorial fund was set up in his name at Williams College and funds fellowships.
