= Giancarlo Gallesi =

Italian footballer and manager (1932–2022)

Personal information
- Date of birth: 25 January 1932
- Place of birth: Vigevano, Italy
- Date of death: 22 February 2022 (aged 90)
- Place of death: Mede, Italy
- Height: 1.74 m (5 ft 9 in)
- Position: Goalkeeper

Senior career*
Years	Team	Apps	(Gls)
1959–1960	AC Milan		
- Genoa
- Monza
Total		39	(0)

Managerial career
- Vigevano
- Mortara
- * Club domestic league appearances and goals

Giancarlo Gallesi (25 January 1932 – 22 February 2022) was an Italian professional football player and manager.

== Career ==
Born in Vigevano, Gallesi played as a goalkeeper for AC Milan, Genoa and Monza, making 13 appearances in Serie A and 26 appearances in Serie B. He later managed Vigevano and Mortara.

== Personal life and death ==
Gallesi died in Mede on 22 February 2022, at the age of 90.
