= Gaudenzio Bernasconi =

Italian footballer (1932–2023)

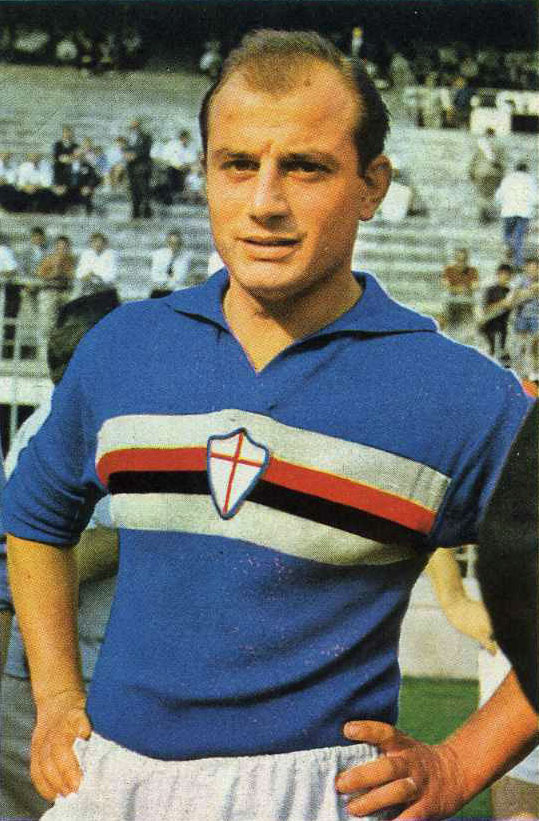
- Bernasconi with Sampdoria in 1961

Personal information
- Date of birth: 8 August 1932
- Place of birth: Ponte San Pietro, Italy
- Date of death: 10 January 2023 (aged 90)
- Place of death: Bergamo, Italy
- Height: 1.72 m (5 ft 8 in)
- Position: Midfielder

Senior career*
Years	Team	Apps	(Gls)
1949–1952	Ponte San Pietro	51	(0)
1952–1954	Atalanta	54	(0)
1954–1965	Sampdoria	334	(0)
1965–1968	Jesi	89	(0)
1968–1970	Urbino	38	(0)

International career
1956–1959	Italy	6	(0)

Managerial career
- 1967–1968: Jesi
- * Club domestic league appearances and goals

Gaudenzio Bernasconi (Italian pronunciation: [ɡauˈdɛntsjo bernaˈskoːni]; 8 August 1932 – 10 January 2023) was an Italian football player and coach, who played as a midfielder. He held the record for most appearances for Sampdoria with 334, and is now third, behind only Roberto Mancini and Moreno Mannini.

== Club career ==
Bernasconi played for 13 seasons (388 games, no goals) in the Italian Serie A for Atalanta B.C. and U.C. Sampdoria.

== International career ==
Bernasconi made his debut for the Italy national team on 25 April 1956 in a game against Brazil. In total, he obtained six caps for Italy between 1956 and 1959.
