= James L. Gaudino =

American academic administrator

14th President of Central Washington University
- In office January 1, 2009 – June 6, 2021
- Succeeded by: James Wohlpart

Personal details
- Education: United States Air Force Academy (BS); Troy University (MS); Michigan State University (PhD)

Military service
- Branch/service: United States Air Force

James L. Gaudino is an American retired academic administrator who was the 14th President of Central Washington University in Ellensburg, Washington, from 2009 to 2021.

== Education ==
Gaudino earned a bachelor's degree from the United States Air Force Academy and served in California, Turkey, and Germany. He then earned a master's degree in management from Troy University and a PhD in communications from Michigan State University.

== Career ==
Gaudino's research focuses on public relations and public opinion formation. Prior to joining Central Washington University, Gaudino founded the College of Communication and Information at Kent State University and worked on the faculty of the Michigan State University Department of Advertising. He was executive director of the National Communication Association. Gaudino took office as president on January 1, 2009. In 2020, Gaudino announced that he would retire from his position in 2021. He retired on June 6, 2021, and was succeeded the following day by James Wohlpart.
