= Coppa dell'Amicizia =

Tournament

The Coppa dell'Amicizia (Cup of Friendship) was a summer association football friendly tournament for clubs and nations, which was held in a friendly matter in the time frame between 1959 and 1968. The first edition was named the Cup of French-Italian Friendship (Italian: Coppa dell'Amicizia Italo-Francese, French: Coupe de l'Amitié Franco-Italienne), a tournament in which the 1959, 1960 and 1961 seasons saw teams from Italy and France compete. The tournament provided that each of the participants faced opponents from the other nation with the formula of home and away matches, and that the points accumulated in a general classification would determine the winning nation. Five teams participated in the first edition of representatives, in the second sixteen, and ten in the third.

In 1962, the first and only edition of the Cup of French-Italian-Swiss Friendship (Italian: Coppa dell'Amicizia Italo-Franco-Svizzera, French: Coupe de l'Amitié Franco-Italo-Suisse, German: Pokal der Französisch-Italienisch-Schweizerische Freundschaft) was held. Sixteen teams (six Italian, six French and four Swiss) competed in a tournament using the classical format of second round, quarterfinals, semifinals, and final, all articulated to lots of return. The following year still featured French and Italian clubs (four per representative), but this time with a formula similar to that of 1962 (quarterfinals, semifinals and final) to designate a single winner.

The next competition was named the Cup of Italian-Spanish Friendship (Italian: Coppa dell'Amicizia Italo-Spagnola, Spanish: Copa de la Amistad Español-Italiana). Juventus FC and Real Madrid agreed to play two matches, one in Turin, and the second in Madrid. The first edition (a match ending 1:3) was held in Turin in 1963; the second (a return match 0:2), due to the many obligations of the two clubs was played in Madrid in 1965. The aggregate draw at the end of the two games (as away goals did not yet count double), determined the need to resort to penalties for the final allocation of the trophy.

The final cup was the Cup of Italian-Swiss Friendship (Italian: Coppa dell'Amicizia Italo-Svizzera, French: Coupe de l'Amitié Suisse-Italienne, German: Pokal der Schweizerische-Italienisch Freundschaft), with two editions held in 1967 and 1968. The tournament took place entirely on Swiss soil, with the participation of three Italian and three Swiss teams. Each team met with the formula of one-way, three participants from the country and the winner turned out the one with the highest number of points counted in one overall ranking.

== Finals ==
Year	Champion	Result	Runners-Up
Cup of French-Italian Friendship
1959	Italy (Milan, Inter, Fiorentina, Juventus, Atalanta)	14–6	France (Nice, RC Paris, Nîmes, Reims, Le Havre)
1960	Italy (Juventus, Bologna, Bari, Udinese, Reggiana, Brescia, Marzotto Valdagno, Como, Fiorentina, Milan, Atalanta, SPAL, Lazio, Torino, Lecco, Ozo Mantova)	41–23	France (Reims, Nice, Valenciennes, Limoges, Grenoble, Troyes, Red Star, Metz, RC Paris, Toulouse, Lens, Le Havre, Sedan, Nancy, Rouen, Montpellier)
1961	Italy (SPAL, Lanerossi Vicenza, Atalanta, Milan, Padova, Venezia, Prato, Ozo Mantova, Como, Genoa)	22–18	France (Saint-Étienne, Sedan, Nancy, Nîmes, Rouen, Montpellier, Strasbourg, Metz, Sochaux, Cannes)
Cup of Italian-French-Swiss Friendship
1962	(France) Lens	2–1, 1–1	(Italy) Torino
Cup of French-Italian Friendship
1963	(Italy) Genoa	2–1	(Italy) Milan
Cup of Italian-Spanish Friendship
1963–1965	(Italy) Juventus FC	1–3, 2–0 (5–4 pen)	(Spain) Real Madrid
1966	Not played.		
Cup of Italian-Swiss Friendship
1967	(Italy) Brescia	*	(Italy) Ozo Mantova
1968	(Italy) SPAL	*	(Italy) Atalanta
