= Luciano Gaudino =

Italian footballer

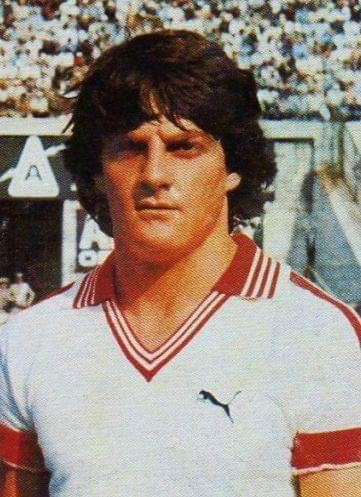
- Luciano Gaudino in kits Milan

Personal information
- Date of birth: July 13, 1958 (age 68)
- Place of birth: Pompei, Italy
- Height: 1.82 m (5 ft 11 1/2 in)
- Position: Striker

Senior career*
Years	Team	Apps	(Gls)
1974–1975	Nocerina	0	(0)
1975–1978	Milan	10	(2)
1976–1977	→ Varese (loan)	0	(0)
1978–1981	Bari	45	(11)
1981–1982	Forlì	15	(1)
1982–1983	Virtus Casarano	9	(1)
1983–1984	Savona	20	(1)
1984–1985	Frosinone	30	(7)
1985–1986	Reggina	15	(3)
1986–1987	Frosinone	30	(12)
1987–1989	Lodigiani	45	(6)
1990–1991	Velletri	26	(3)

International career
1977	Italy U-20	1	(0)
- * Club domestic league appearances and goals

Luciano Gaudino (born July 13, 1958, in Pompei) is a retired Italian professional footballer.

He played in ten games, scoring two goals, in Serie A for A.C. Milan in the 1977–78 season.

He represented Italy at the 1977 FIFA World Youth Championship.
