= 2010–11 AC Milan season =

Milan
2010–11 season
- Chairman: Vacant
- Head coach: Massimiliano Allegri
- Stadium: San Siro
- Serie A: 1st
- Coppa Italia: Semi-finals
- UEFA Champions League: Round of 16
- Top goalscorer: League: Zlatan Ibrahimović; Alexandre Pato; Robinho (14 each); All: Zlatan Ibrahimović (21)
- Highest home attendance: 80,018 vs Inter Milan, Serie A, 2 April 2011; 80,018 vs Cagliari, Serie A, 14 May 2011
- Lowest home attendance: 9,391 vs Bari, Coppa Italia, 20 January 2011
- Average home league attendance: 53,916
Home colours	Away colours	Third colours

The 2010–11 season was Associazione Calcio Milan's 77th season in Serie A, and their 28th consecutive season in the top flight of Italian football. It was the first season under new head coach Massimiliano Allegri, who replaced Leonardo, and with new shirt sponsors Fly Emirates, after four seasons with Bwin.

Milan secured their 18th Serie A title – their first since 2003–04 – following a goalless draw away against Roma on 7 May. The club also competed in the Champions League, being knocked out by Tottenham Hotspur in the round of 16, and took part in the Coppa Italia, being eliminated by Palermo in the semi-finals.

== Pre-season and friendlies ==
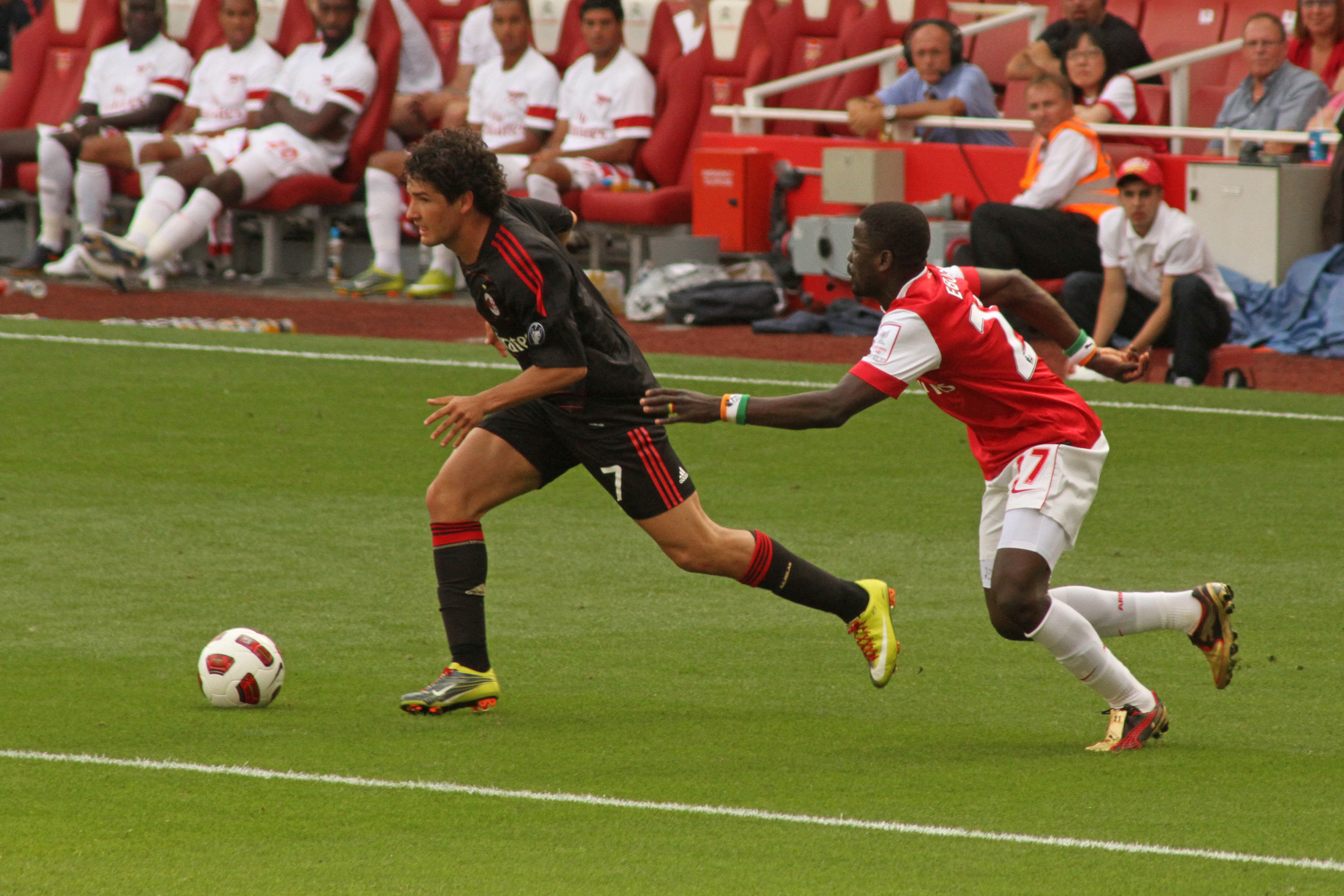
Alexandre Pato in action during the game against Arsenal at the Emirates Stadium.

For the second-straight year, Milan opened their pre-season by taking on Varese in an away game, on 25 July. Unlike the previous year, however, they suffered a 2–0 defeat, with first-half goals from Daniele Buzzegoli and Marco Cellini.

As part of the Emirates Cup, Milan then played two friendlies against Arsenal and Lyon at the Emirates Stadium, London, on 31 July and 1 August respectively. Both games finished 1–1. Alexandre Pato headed an equalizer late in the second half against Arsenal, after the English club had gone ahead through Marouane Chamakh. Meanwhile, Marco Borriello opened the scoring against Lyon before Jimmy Briand tied the game with 12 minutes to play. The tournament was eventually won by Arsenal.

The Rossoneri later traveled to the United States to face Greek side Panathinaikos in Detroit on 6 August. The first 90 minutes ended in a scoreless draw, though early in the second half the Greeks had a goal disallowed despite the ball having crossed the line. Without extra time, the game went straight to penalties where Milan won 5–3, with Daniele Bonera converting the deciding spot-kick.

Following the club's return to Italy, on 13 August, they took part in the TIM Trophy, held in Bari, along with Internazionale and Juventus. In the first of two 45-minute matches, Milan faced Juventus, who had previously been defeated by Inter; Ronaldinho opened the scoring in the 20th minute, but Juventus later equalized through Diego, setting the final score at 1–1. Penalties were taken to assign one extra point for the tournament standings and Milan won 4–2, as goalkeeper Marco Amelia completed two saves. The second and deciding game against Inter finished in a goalless draw, again forcing penalties. Misfires by Mathieu Flamini, Filippo Inzaghi and Ronaldinho resulted in a 3–2 loss, and the trophy was awarded to Inter.

Juventus were also Milan's opponents in the annual Trofeo Luigi Berlusconi, held at the San Siro on 22 August. The match finished scoreless after 90 minutes and the winners had to be decided by penalties. Juventus won on penalties 5–4, as Thiago Silva was the only player to miss from the spot.

Milan concluded their pre-season on 25 August, taking on Barcelona in the 45th edition of the Joan Gamper Trophy. After a goalless first half, David Villa opened the scoring for Barcelona only two minutes into the second half. Inzaghi equalized in the 67th minute with a volley off a cross by Clarence Seedorf, setting the final score to 1–1 and sending the game to penalties, which Barcelona won 3–1 to lift the trophy.

During the league winter break, Milan traveled to Dubai where they resumed their trainings and played a friendly match against local club Al-Ahli on 2 January 2011. The match ended 2–1 for the Rossoneri, who opened the scoring through Clarence Seedorf late in the first half, and then doubled their lead through youth team striker Giacomo Beretta in the 73rd minute, before the hosts pulled one back with a 25-yard strike by Hasan Ali.

Win Draw Loss

Date	Opponents	H / A	Result F – A	Scorers	Attendance
25 July 2010	Varese	A	0 – 2		6,000
31 July 2010	Arsenal	A	1 – 1	Pato 77'	60,012
1 August 2010	Lyon	N	1 – 1	Borriello 55'	59,727
6 August 2010	Panathinaikos	N	0 – 0 (5 – 3p)		30,540
13 August 2010	Juventus (45 mins)	N	1 – 1 (4 – 2p)	Ronaldinho 20'	40,000
13 August 2010	Internazionale (45 mins)	N	0 – 0 (2 – 3p)		40,000
22 August 2010	Juventus	H	0 – 0 (4 – 5p)		35,000
25 August 2010	Barcelona	A	1 – 1 (1 – 3p)	Inzaghi 67'	96,195
2 January 2011	Al-Ahli	A	2 – 1	Seedorf 38', Beretta 73'	12,000

== Serie A ==

Starting lineup. Before Milan signed Mark van Bommel (Allegri's first choice since January), the defensive midfielder position was usually occupied by Massimo Ambrosini or Andrea Pirlo.

The fixtures for the current Serie A season were announced by the Serie A on 28 July. Milan began their league campaign by cruising past newly promoted Lecce at the San Siro on Sunday, 29 August. The Rossoneri took the lead after 16 minutes with an angled drive by Alexandre Pato. Soon after, Thiago Silva scrambled home a corner, before Pato grabbed his second goal of the night, setting the score to 3–0 by the 28th minute. There was little action in the second half until shortly before the final whistle, when Filippo Inzaghi made it 4–0. After the first round of league games, Milan topped the table on goal difference.

After a two-week break for international play, Milan traveled to the Stadio Dino Manuzzi to face another newly promoted team, Cesena. The match was much anticipated, as it would feature the debut of new signings Zlatan Ibrahimović and Robinho. It turned out to be a disappointing night for the Rossoneri, however, who lost 2–0. After missing a couple of early chances with Ronaldinho and Thiago Silva and having a goal disallowed for offside, they went behind in the 31st minute, as Erjon Bogdani headed in a cross from Ezequiel Schelotto. One minute before half-time, Cesena doubled their lead through Emanuele Giaccherini on a fast paced counter-attack. Milan had another goal called off early in the second half, this time for handball, but in the end were unable to score, with Ibrahimović missing a penalty in the late stages of the game.

Only three days after defeating Auxerre in Champions League, Milan took on Catania at the San Siro. The Sicilians opened the scoring in the 27th minute through Ciro Capuano, who fired a 30-yard strike past Christian Abbiati. Moments before the interval, Milan equalised with a goal from Filippo Inzaghi. After a scoreless second half, the game ended in a 1–1 draw. It went no better on the following Wednesday, as Milan recorded another 1–1 draw in a mid-week game against Lazio. The Rossoneri went ahead in the 66th minute thanks to Ibrahimović. Clarence Seedorf played a long through-ball to the Swede, who dribbled goalkeeper Fernando Muslera and scored. The hosts equalised with nine minutes to play through a first-time shot by Sergio Floccari on Hernanes' cross. In the last minutes, both teams missed the chance to claim the victory: Gianluca Zambrotta hit the crossbar with a powerful strike from just outside the box, while Hernanes was denied by a save from Abbiati.

Milan returned to winning ways by defeating Genoa 1–0 at home on Saturday, 25 September. The lone goal was scored by Ibrahimović in the 49th minute. The Swede striker chased a long ball by Andrea Pirlo and managed to stuck his leg between defenders Dario Dainelli and Andrea Ranocchia to kick the ball over the head of goalkeeper Eduardo, who only managed to palm it into the net. Milan repeated themselves the following Saturday, beating Parma, to get their first away victory of the season. The only scorer was Pirlo with a 35-yard shot in the 25th minute.

After the second break for internationals of the season, Milan defeated Chievo 3–1 at home on Saturday, 16 October. Pato opened the scoring for the Rossoneri in the 18th minute with a one-time shot off an Ibrahimović cross. The Brazilian scored again twelve minutes later, following a quick free kick by Ibrahimović. In the second half, Chievo pulled one back, as a header from Sergio Pellissier was deflected by Ibrahimović into his own net. Milan's third and final goal was scored by Robinho in stoppage time.

Milan claimed a fourth consecutive win in the league, as they beat Napoli at the San Paolo on Monday, 25 October. The Rossoneri went ahead in the 22nd minute through Robinho, who played a one-two with Massimo Oddo and shot the ball past Napoli goalkeeper Morgan De Sanctis from just inside the penalty area. Zlatan Ibrahimović headed in a cross by Oddo to double the lead in the 71st minute. With 12 minutes to play, Napoli pulled one back through Ezequiel Lavezzi, but Milan managed to resist and eventually won 2–1.

Milan's winning streak came to an end on Saturday, 30 October, when they played host to Juventus and were defeated 2–1. The Rossoneri had a good start, but failed to score: Zlatan Ibrahimović hit the crossbar with a 25-yard shot in the seventh minute, while Pato was called offside moments later when he was one-on-one with the goalkeeper. The visitors then took lead in the 24th minute through Fabio Quagliarella, who headed in a cross from Paolo De Ceglie. Despite Milan's efforts to equalise, Juventus doubled their lead midway in the second half through Alessandro Del Piero. Eight minutes before the end, Ibrahimović scored Milan's lone goal of the evening, a header off Luca Antonini's cross, which could not prevent the loss.

Four days after drawing against Real Madrid in the Champions League, Milan traveled to the San Nicola to take on Bari. The Rossoneri quickly went ahead, as Massimo Ambrosini headed in a cross by Clarence Seedorf in the fourth minute. Shortly after the half-hour mark, Milan doubled their lead through Mathieu Flamini, who received the ball from Zlatan Ibrahimović inside the penalty area and put it past Bari goalkeeper Jean-François Gillet into the net. The hosts pulled one back in the 65th minute with a goal from Vitali Kutuzov, but seven minutes later Pato made it 3–1 following a pass from Seedorf, before a late goal from Barreto set the final score to 3–2. The Rossoneri subsequently claimed a midweek home victory over Palermo. Pato opened the scoring, heading in a corner by Seedorf in the 19th minute. The visitors equalised 18 minutes in the second half through Armin Bačinović, whose 25-yard strike surprised goalkeeper Christian Abbiati. Milan, however, were awarded a penalty in 77th minute, as Palermo 'keeper Salvatore Sirigu brought down Ambrosini. Ibrahimović stepped up and scored for Milan to regain the lead. Seven minutes before time, Robinho made it 3–1 and sealed the win, which meant Milan were back at the top of the table, one point ahead Lazio.

At the following weekend, Milan were to face Internazionale in the first Derby della Madonnina of the season, which the Rossoneri had lost on the last three occasions. Only five minutes into the game, Zlatan Ibrahimović was awarded a penalty for being taken down by Marco Materazzi; Ibrahimović himself converted the spot-kick to put Milan ahead. Despite being left with ten men, as Ignazio Abate was sent off in the 60th minute, Milan managed to maintain the lead and claimed a third straight victory. Milan then played host to Fiorentina on 20 November. A goal from Ibrahimović shortly before half-time was enough for Milan to claim a 1–0 victory. The Swedish striker chested a cross from Thiago Silva inside the penalty area and scored in the bottom right corner with an overhead kick.

After clinching qualification to the knockout stage of the Champions League in mid-week, Milan traveled to Genoa to face Sampdoria on Saturday, 27 November. Despite Milan going ahead shortly before the interval through Robinho, who combined with Ibrahimović and scored from inside the box, the hosts managed to equalise on the hour with a goal by Giampaolo Pazzini, setting the final score to 1–1.

Milan returned to winning ways defeating Brescia 3–0 at home in the first game of December, on the fourth. The Rossoneri took lead four minutes from the kick-off: Zlatan Ibrahimović combined with Massimo Ambrosini on the left wing and sent a low cross into the goal area to Kevin-Prince Boateng, who volleyed the ball in for his first goal since joining the club in August. Shortly before the half-hour mark, Robinho doubled Milan's lead after intercepting a back pass from a Brescia player. Three minutes later, Ibrahimović scored the third and final goal with a powerful strike from just inside the box.

Three days after playing the last match of the Champions League group stage against Ajax, Milan travelled to the Stadio Renato Dall'Ara to face Bologna. The Rossoneri took the lead in the ninth minute with a goal by Boateng, who just like the previous week volleyed into the net a cross from Ibrahimović. Milan doubled their lead ten minutes before half time through Robinho, who beat the goalkeeper following a through-ball by Boateng. Right on the hour mark, Andrea Pirlo played a pin-pointed cross to Ibrahimović, who controlled the ball into the penalty area and scored into the low right corner, sealing Milan's second straight 3–0 win. But in the last match before a three-week winter break, Milan lost 1–0 to Roma at the San Siro, the lone goal being scored by former Rossonero striker Marco Borriello.

The league resumed on Thursday, 6 January; Milan traveled to the Stadio Sant'Elia to take on Cagliari. After a scoreless first half, during which the hosts hit the woodwork once, Milan went on to win the game thanks to the first career goal by 20-year-old Sierra Leonean midfielder Rodney Strasser five minutes before time. New signing Antonio Cassano, at his first official appearance for the club, provided the assist for the goal. Three days later, Milan played host to Udinese at the San Siro. The visitors took the lead in the 35th minute through Antonio Di Natale, who slid the ball into an empty net after Gökhan Inler hit the post; but the Rossoneri equalised in first-half injury time with Pato, who scored following a low cross by Ibrahimović. Udinese regained the lead eight minutes into the second half with a header by Alexis Sánchez and went ahead 3–1 when Di Natale scored his second of the day. Milan, however, pulled one back in the 78th minute, as Mehdi Benatia headed a cross by Thiago Silva into his own net, and equalised four minutes later through Pato, who had been set up by Cassano. With only one minute remaining, Germán Denis put Udinese ahead once again on a counter-attack, but in injury time Cassano set up Ibrahimović to make it 4–4. Despite the draw, Milan topped the table at the halfway mark.

Milan were held to a second straight draw, 1–1 away against Lecce. The Rossoneri took the lead at the beginning of the second half with a 25-yard strike by Ibrahimović, but Rubén Olivera equalised for the host eight minutes before time.

After a victory over Bari in the Coppa Italia round of 16 in mid-week, Milan returned to winning ways in the league too, by defeating Cesena 2–0 at home on 23 January. The Rossoneri took the lead in the last minute of the first half, when Cesena defender Maximiliano Pellegrino slid the ball into his own net while attempting to prevent Ibrahimović from shooting, following a cross by Cassano. The second goal came in injury time, as Robinho played a through-ball to Ibrahimović who put it past the goalkeeper from inside the penalty area.

Three days after knocking Sampdoria out of the Coppa Italia quarter-finals, Milan traveled to Sicily to take on Catania on 29 January. Despite going down to ten men in the second half following Mark van Bommel's ejection, the Rossoneri managed to take the lead two minutes before the hour mark through Robinho, who converted a loose ball after Ibrahimović's free-kick was saved. The hosts then created more scoring opportunities, but did not manage to find an equaliser and instead, five minutes from time, Ibrahimović made it 2–0 and sealed the win. The following Tuesday, Milan were held to a scoreless home draw by Lazio in a mid-week game.

The Rossoneri were forced to another draw on Sunday, 6 February, when they faced Genoa at the Stadio Luigi Ferraris. Milan had taken the lead shortly before the half-hour mark through Pato, who converted a low cross by Ibrahimović, but the hosts equalised in first-half injury time with a goal by Antonio Floro Flores from deep inside the penalty area.

At the following weekend, Milan cruised past Parma at home. The Rossoneri took the lead in the eighth minute through Clarence Seedorf, who dribbled the opponents' goalkeeper following a pass by Ibrahimović. Less than ten minutes later, Antonio Cassano made it 2–0 after a combination with Gennaro Gattuso. In the second half, Robinho, who had just come on, scored Milan's third and fourth goal to seal the win.

After suffering a defeat by Tottenham Hotspur in the Champions League round of 16 in mid-week, Milan managed to snap up a second consecutive league win, a 2–1 away at Chievo on Sunday, 20 February. The Rossoneri opened the scoring in the 25th minute: Ibrahimović headed Antonio Cassano's cross to Robinho, who chested the ball and scored in the bottom corner from inside the goal area. The hosts equalised shortly after the hour mark, as Gélson Fernandes headed in Kévin Constant's cross from ten yards. Milan, however, found the winning goal eight minutes from time, thanks to a solo effort by substitute Pato.

Milan went on to claim a third straight victory over second-placed Napoli at home on Monday, 28 February. After a scoreless first half, the Rossoneri went ahead in the 49th minute, as Ibrahimović converted a penalty awarded for a handball by Salvatore Aronica. Kevin-Prince Boateng doubled Milan's lead in the 77th minute, volleying the ball into the net off Pato's low cross and two minutes later Pato himself sealed the win, making it 3–0 with a strike from outside the box. The victory saw Milan move five points clear of Internazionale at the top of the table, while Napoli dropped to third, one point behind Inter.

The Rossoneri won again the following Saturday, snapping up a 1–0 victory in Turin against Juventus. The lone goal was scored by Gennaro Gattuso midway through the second half, as his left footed attempt from the edge of the penalty area was not held by Juventus goalkeeper Gianluigi Buffon.

After being knocked-out from the Champions League earlier in the week, Milan's four-game winning streak in the league was halted by a 1–1 home draw against Bari on 13 March. The visitors took the lead late in the first half through Gergely Rudolf, following a free-kick by Sergio Almirón. Milan's equaliser in the very first minutes of the second half was called off, due to Robinho being in an offside position. On the hour mark, the Rossoneri had another goal disallowed for handball, as Ibrahimović had controlled the ball with his arm. Later on, Ibrahimović was ejected for hitting Bari defender Marco Rossi. Despite Milan being left to ten men, Antonio Cassano scored the equaliser eight minutes from time, volleying Luca Antonini's cross into the net.

With their top goalscorer Ibrahimović serving the first of a two-game ban, Milan suffered a 1–0 defeat against Palermo at the Stadio Renzo Barbera on 19 March. The hosts' goal was scored by defender Dorin Goian, who chested the ball inside the six-yard box following a corner kick and put it past Milan goalkeeper Christian Abbiati.

The loss against Palermo meant that Milan's gap over cross-city rivals Inter at the top of the table was reduced to two points, before the two side met in the second Derby della Madonnina of the season on Saturday, 2 April. The game got off to a quick start, with Milan taking the lead after only 45 seconds: Gattuso sent a through ball to Robinho and as the Brazilian tried to dribble Inter goalkeeper Júlio César, the ball was deflected towards Pato, who stroked it in. Ten minutes later, the Rossoneri claimed a penalty when a shot by Clarence Seedorf was stopped with an arm by defender Maicon, but the referee let play continue. Shortly before half-time, Inter had a couple of a chance to tie, first with a header by Thiago Motta that was saved by Abbiati, then with Samuel Eto'o, who fired wide from a few yards. Ten minutes into the second half, Inter was left down to ten men, as Cristian Chivu was sent off for a last-man foul. Milan subsequently doubled their lead in the 62nd minute through Pato, who scored his second goal of the night with a header off Ignazio Abate's cross. In the last minute, Milan was awarded a penalty which Antonio Cassano converted, setting the final score to 3–0. Cassano, however, was ejected in injury time after receiving a second yellow card. The win allowed Milan to retain their lead at the top of the Serie A table, three points clear of Napoli and five points clear of Inter, with seven games remaining.

Milan went on to seize a second consecutive victory against Fiorentina in Florence on Sunday, 10 April. The Rossoneri took the lead as soon as the eight-minute, with Seedorf sending into the net a through-ball by Pato. Pato himself then scored Milan's second goal four minutes from half time, after a combination between Ibrahimović and Kevin-Prince Boateng. The hosts pulled one back with 11 minutes to go, when Juan Manuel Vargas's shot from outside the box was deflected into his own net by Gattuso. Despite being left down to ten men, as Ibrahimović was ejected in the 87th minute, Milan managed to hold on and snap up a 2–1 win.

The following weekend, Milan played host to Sampdoria. Despite the visitors having the first big chance of the game, it was Milan who took the lead in the 20th minute, with a 25-yard free-kick by Clarence Seedorf. In the second half, the Rossoneri doubled their lead with a penalty converted by Antonio Cassano, who had replaced an injured Pato shortly before the break. Cassano then also set up Robinho for Milan's third and final goal with less than half an hour to go. As both Napoli and Inter lost their respective games, Milan extended their lead at the top of the table to six points, with five games remaining.

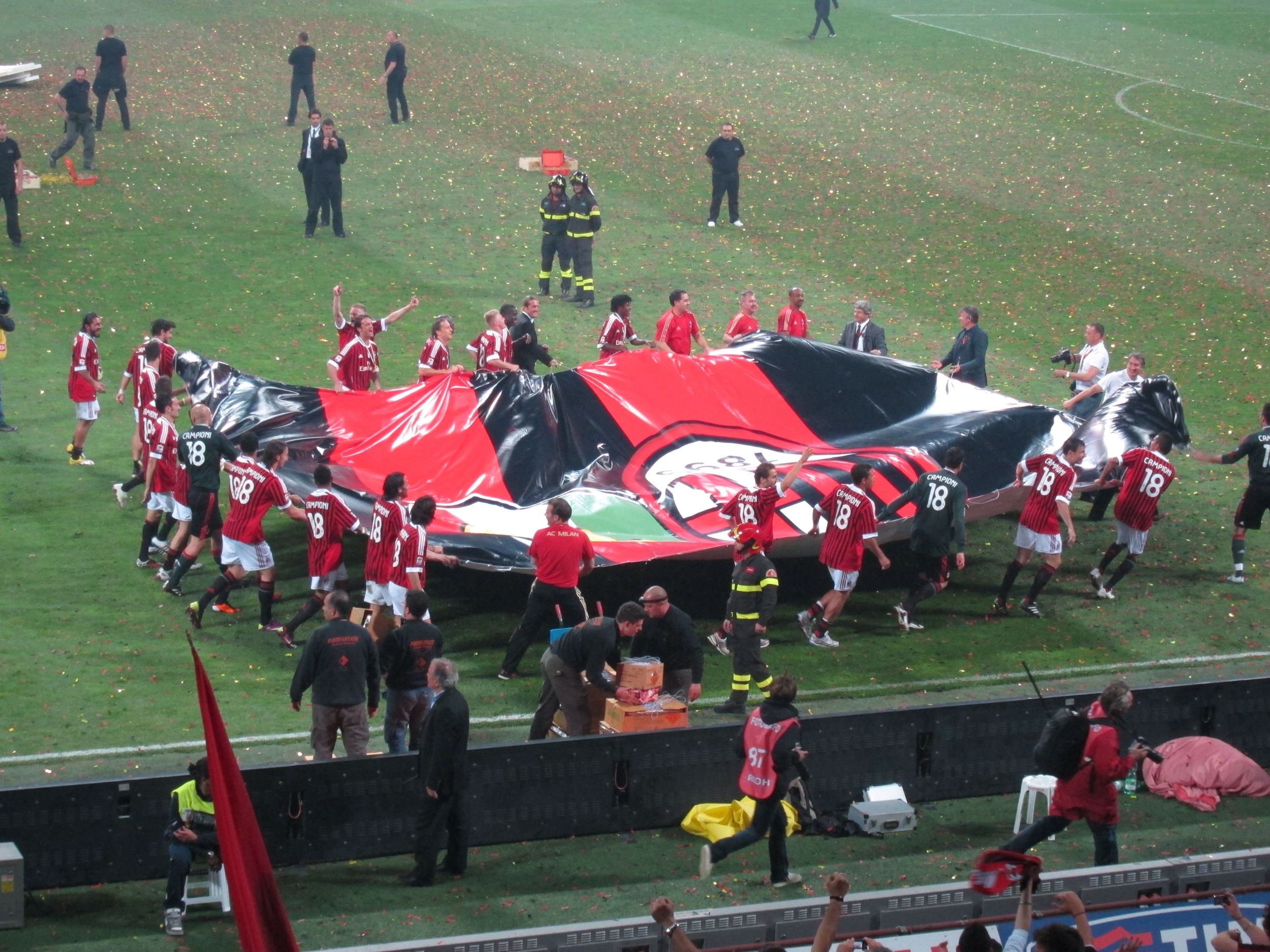
Milan's players celebrating the title at the San Siro.

Three days after playing the first leg of the Coppa Italia semi-finals, Milan claimed a fourth-straight win in the league on Saturday, 23 April. The Rossoneri defeated Brescia 1–0 at the Stadio Rigamonti with a late goal by Robinho, despite the hosts creating several dangerous chances throughout the second half. Since second-placed Napoli lost their game that same day and dropped to third behind Inter, Milan's lead was extended to eight points, with four games to play. Milan then seized their fifth win in a row by defeating Bologna 1–0 at home on Sunday, 1 May. The lone goal of the match was scored by Mathieu Flamini in the eighth minute: the Frenchman received a through ball inside the box and after having his first shot saved by the opponent goalkeeper, he managed to score off the rebound.

Milan traveled to the Stadio Olimpico to take on Roma in their third-to-last league game of the season on 7 May. Due to their eight-point lead, a draw would have been enough for the Rossoneri to secure the title. The hosts created more scoring chances in the first half, yet being unable to score. After the break, Milan was more aggressive and had goal opportunities of their own. In particular, Robinho hit the post with a strike from just inside the box and Boateng fired off wide one-on-one against the opponent goalkeeper. The game eventually ended in a scoreless draw, which allowed to secure the 18th Serie A title of their history.

A week later, Milan celebrated the title with a 4–1 win over Cagliari in their last home game of the season. After the match, the Rossoneri were awarded the trophy in front of a capacity crowd. Milan concluded their season with a scoreless draw away at Udinese on Sunday, 22 May.

=== League table ===
Pos	Team	Pld	W	D	L	GF	GA	GD	Pts	Qualification or relegation
1	Milan (C)	38	24	10	4	65	24	+41	82	Qualification to Champions League group stage
2	Internazionale	38	23	7	8	69	42	+27	76	Qualification to Champions League group stage
3	Napoli	38	21	7	10	59	39	+20	70	Qualification to Champions League group stage
4	Udinese	38	20	6	12	65	43	+22	66 (Note: Udinese finished ahead of Lazio on head-to-head away goals scored: Udinese 2–1 Lazio, Lazio 3–2 Udinese.)	Qualification to Champions League play-off round
5	Lazio	38	20	6	12	55	39	+16	66	Qualification to Europa League play-off round (Note: As Internazionale won the 2010–11 Coppa Italia and already qualified for the Champions League, Palermo entered the 2011–12 UEFA Europa League third qualification round as the cup runners-up.)

Source: Lega Serie A
Rules for classification: 1) points; 2) head-to-head points; 3) head-to-head goal difference; 4) head-to-head goals scored; 5) goal difference; 6) number of goals scored.
(C) Champions

=== Results summary ===
Overall								Home						Away					
Pld	W	D	L	GF	GA	GD	Pts	W	D	L	GF	GA	GD	W	D	L	GF	GA	GD
38	24	10	4	65	24	+41	82	13	4	2	42	12	+30	11	6	2	23	12	+11

=== Results by round ===
Round	1	2	3	4	5	6	7	8	9	10	11	12	13	14	15	16	17	18	19	20	21	22	23	24	25	26	27	28	29	30	31	32	33	34	35	36	37	38
Ground	H	A	H	A	H	A	H	A	H	A	H	A	H	A	H	A	H	A	H	A	H	A	H	A	H	A	H	A	H	A	H	A	H	A	H	A	H	A
Result	W	L	D	D	W	W	W	W	L	W	W	W	W	D	W	W	L	W	D	D	W	W	D	D	W	W	W	W	D	L	W	W	W	W	W	D	W	D
Position	1	7	10	8	5	4	2	2	3	2	1	1	1	1	1	1	1	1	1	1	1	1	1	1	1	1	1	1	1	1	1	1	1	1	1	1	1	1

A = Away; H = Home; W = Win; D = Draw; L = Loss

=== Matches ===
Win Draw Loss

29 August 2010 1	Milan	4–0	Lecce	Milan
20:45 CEST (UTC+02:00)	Pato 16', 28'; Thiago Silva 23'; Inzaghi 90'			Stadium: San Siro; Attendance: 37,177; Referee: Sebastiano Peruzzo

11 September 2010 2	Cesena	2–0	Milan	Cesena
20:45 CEST (UTC+02:00)	Bogdani 31'; Giaccherini 44'			Stadium: Stadio Dino Manuzzi; Attendance: 21,058; Referee: Carmine Russo

18 September 2010 3	Milan	1–1	Catania	Milan
20:45 CEST (UTC+02:00)	Inzaghi 45'		Capuano 27'	Stadium: San Siro; Attendance: 42,637; Referee: Emidio Morganti

22 September 2010 4	Lazio	1–1	Milan	Rome
20:45 CEST (UTC+02:00)	Floccari 81'		Ibrahimović 66'	Stadium: Stadio Olimpico; Attendance: 41,246; Referee: Luca Banti

25 September 2010 5	Milan	1–0	Genoa	Milan
18:00 CEST (UTC+02:00)	Ibrahimović 49'			Stadium: San Siro; Attendance: 41,909; Referee: Paolo Valeri

2 October 2010 6	Parma	0–1	Milan	Parma
20:45 CEST (UTC+02:00)			Pirlo 25'	Stadium: Stadio Ennio Tardini; Attendance: 19,615; Referee: Daniele Orsato

16 October 2010 7	Milan	3–1	Chievo	Milan
18:00 CEST (UTC+02:00)	Pato 18', 30'; Robinho 90+3'		Ibrahimović 70' (o.g.)	Stadium: San Siro; Attendance: 49,170; Referee: Andrea Gervasoni

25 October 2010 8	Napoli	1–2	Milan	Naples
20:45 CEST (UTC+02:00)	Lavezzi 78'		Robinho 22'; Ibrahimović 71'	Stadium: Stadio San Paolo; Attendance: 53,909; Referee: Nicola Rizzoli

30 October 2010 9	Milan	1–2	Juventus	Milan
20:45 CEST (UTC+02:00)	Ibrahimović 82'		Quagliarella 24'; Del Piero 65'	Stadium: San Siro; Attendance: 76,768; Referee: Gianluca Rocchi

7 November 2010 10	Bari	2–3	Milan	Bari
15:00 CET (UTC+01:00)	Kutuzov 65'; Barreto 90'		Ambrosini 4'; Flamini 31'; Pato 72'	Stadium: Stadio San Nicola; Attendance: 35,780; Referee: Mauro Bergonzi

10 November 2010 11	Milan	3–1	Palermo	Milan
20:45 CET (UTC+01:00)	Pato 19'; Ibrahimović 77' (pen.); Robinho 83'		Bačinovič 63'	Stadium: San Siro; Attendance: 38,903; Referee: Luca Banti

14 November 2010 12	Internazionale	0–1	Milan	Milan
20:45 CET (UTC+01:00)			Ibrahimović 5' (pen.)	Stadium: Giuseppe Meazza; Attendance: 80,018; Referee: Paolo Tagliavento

20 November 2010 13	Milan	1–0	Fiorentina	Milan
20:45 CET (UTC+01:00)	Ibrahimović 45'			Stadium: San Siro; Attendance: 47,549; Referee: Antonio Damato

27 November 2010 14	Sampdoria	1–1	Milan	Genoa
18:00 CET (UTC+01:00)	Pazzini 59'		Robinho 43'	Stadium: Stadio Luigi Ferraris; Attendance: 26,820; Referee: Paolo Mazzoleni

4 December 2010 15	Milan	3–0	Brescia	Milan
20:45 CET (UTC+01:00)	Boateng 4'; Robinho 28'; Ibrahimović 30'			Stadium: San Siro; Attendance: 41,418; Referee: Andrea Gervasoni

12 December 2010 16	Bologna	0–3	Milan	Bologna
12:30 CET (UTC+01:00)			Boateng 9'; Robinho 35'; Ibrahimović 60'	Stadium: Stadio Renato Dall'Ara; Attendance: 24,915; Referee: Gianluca Rocchi

18 December 2010 17	Milan	0–1	Roma	Milan
20:45 CET (UTC+01:00)			Borriello 69'	Stadium: San Siro; Attendance: 53,769; Referee: Antonio Damato

6 January 2011 18	Cagliari	0–1	Milan	Cagliari
15:00 CET (UTC+01:00)			Strasser 85'	Stadium: Stadio Sant'Elia; Attendance: 23,000; Referee: Nicola Rizzoli

9 January 2011 19	Milan	4–4	Udinese	Milan
15:00 CET (UTC+01:00)	Pato 45+1', 82'; Benatia 78' (o.g.); Ibrahimović 90+3'		Di Natale 35', 66'; Sánchez 53'; Denis 89'	Stadium: San Siro; Attendance: 39,405; Referee: Paolo Valeri

16 January 2011 20	Lecce	1–1	Milan	Lecce
20:45 CET (UTC+01:00)	R. Olivera 82'		Ibrahimović 49'	Stadium: Stadio Via del Mare; Attendance: 15,926; Referee: Andrea De Marco

23 January 2011 21	Milan	2–0	Cesena	Milan
20:45 CET (UTC+01:00)	Pellegrino 45' (o.g.); Ibrahimović 90+3'			Stadium: San Siro; Attendance: 37,952; Referee: Andrea Romeo

29 January 2011 22	Catania	0–2	Milan	Catania
20:45 CET (UTC+01:00)			Robinho 58'; Ibrahimović 85'	Stadium: Stadio Angelo Massimino; Attendance: 16,613; Referee: Paolo Tagliavento

1 February 2011 23	Milan	0–0	Lazio	Milan
20:45 CET (UTC+01:00)				Stadium: San Siro; Attendance: 38,809; Referee: Antonio Damato

6 February 2011 24	Genoa	1–1	Milan	Genoa
15:00 CET (UTC+01:00)	Floro Flores 45+1'		Pato 29'	Stadium: Stadio Luigi Ferraris; Attendance: 24,134; Referee: Paolo Mazzoleni

12 February 2011 25	Milan	4–0	Parma	Milan
18:00 CET (UTC+01:00)	Seedorf 8'; Cassano 17'; Robinho 61', 65'			Stadium: San Siro; Attendance: 46,119; Referee: Andrea De Marco

20 February 2011 26	Chievo	1–2	Milan	Verona
15:00 CET (UTC+01:00)	Fernandes 61'		Robinho 25'; Pato 82'	Stadium: Stadio Marcantonio Bentegodi; Attendance: 29,404; Referee: Luca Banti

28 February 2011 27	Milan	3–0	Napoli	Milan
20:45 CET (UTC+01:00)	Ibrahimović 49' (pen.); Boateng 77'; Pato 79'			Stadium: San Siro; Attendance: 77,276; Referee: Gianluca Rocchi

5 March 2011 28	Juventus	0–1	Milan	Turin
20:45 CET (UTC+01:00)			Gattuso 68'	Stadium: Stadio Olimpico; Attendance: 24,908; Referee: Nicola Rizzoli

13 March 2011 29	Milan	1–1	Bari	Milan
12:30 CET (UTC+01:00)	Cassano 82'		Rudolf 39'	Stadium: San Siro; Attendance: 61,363; Referee: Christian Brighi

19 March 2011 30	Palermo	1–0	Milan	Palermo
20:45 CET (UTC+01:00)	Goian 10'			Stadium: Stadio Renzo Barbera; Attendance: 25,116; Referee: Paolo Tagliavento

2 April 2011 31	Milan	3–0	Internazionale	Milan
20:45 CEST (UTC+02:00)	Pato 1', 62'; Cassano 90' (pen.)			Stadium: San Siro; Attendance: 80,018; Referee: Nicola Rizzoli

10 April 2011 32	Fiorentina	1–2	Milan	Florence
20:45 CEST (UTC+02:00)	Vargas 79'		Seedorf 8'; Pato 41'	Stadium: Stadio Artemio Franchi; Attendance: 32,677; Referee: Emidio Morganti

16 April 2011 33	Milan	3–0	Sampdoria	Milan
20:45 CEST (UTC+02:00)	Seedorf 20'; Cassano 54' (pen.); Robinho 61'			Stadium: San Siro; Attendance: 60,028; Referee: Domenico Celi

23 April 2011 34	Brescia	0–1	Milan	Brescia
19:00 CEST (UTC+02:00)			Robinho 82'	Stadium: Stadio Mario Rigamonti; Attendance: 22,123; Referee: Paolo Mazzoleni

1 May 2011 35	Milan	1–0	Bologna	Milan
15:00 CEST (UTC+02:00)	Flamini 8'			Stadium: San Siro; Attendance: 74,121; Referee: Andrea De Marco

7 May 2011 36	Roma	0–0	Milan	Rome
20:45 CEST (UTC+02:00)				Stadium: Stadio Olimpico; Attendance: 58,083; Referee: Emidio Morganti

14 May 2011 37	Milan	4–1	Cagliari	Milan
20:45 CEST (UTC+02:00)	Robinho 22', 35'; Gattuso 24'; Seedorf 77'		Cossu 38'	Stadium: San Siro; Attendance: 80,018; Referee: Maurizio Ciampi

22 May 2011 38	Udinese	0–0	Milan	Udine
20:45 CEST (UTC+02:00)				Stadium: Stadio Friuli; Attendance: 29,644; Referee: Paolo Tagliavento

== Coppa Italia ==
For the 12th season in a row, Milan started the Coppa Italia directly in the round of 16, as one of the eight best seeded teams. They welcomed Bari at the San Siro on Thursday, 20 January. Bari reached the round of 16 after defeating Livorno 4–1 in the Fourth Preliminary Round. Milan, however, easily knocked them out of the competition by sealing a 3–0 win, with goals by Ibrahimović, Alexander Merkel and Robinho.

For the quarter-finals, Milan traveled to Genoa to take on Sampdoria on Wednesday, 26 January. Due to the high number of injuries, head coach Massimiliano Allegri was prompted to put newly arrived duo of Mark van Bommel and Urby Emanuelson in the starting line-up. Milan, however, took only 22 minutes to go ahead 2–0, with both goals being scored by Alexandre Pato. Early in the second half, the hosts pulled one back through Stefano Guberti, but this did not prevent the Rossoneri from winning the game and making it through to the semi-finals, where they will face Palermo.

The semi-finals first leg was played at the San Siro on Wednesday, 20 April. Milan took the lead as soon as the fourth minute with a volley by Ibrahimović off Massimo Oddo's cross. The visitors, however, equalised ten minutes later through Javier Pastore, following a one-two pass with Mauricio Pinilla, and they went ahead 2–1 eight minutes into the second half through Abel Hernández. Less than 15 minutes from time, Urby Emanuelson scored the equaliser for Milan, setting the final score to 2–2.

The second leg was played at the Stadio Renzo Barbera in Palermo on Tuesday, 10 May. Due to the tie in the first-leg, Milan would have needed a win or a 3–3 or higher draw to qualify for the final (while a 2–2 would have sent the game to extra time). After a scoreless first half, Palermo took the lead around the hour mark, with a header by Giulio Migliaccio off a corner kick. Ten minutes later, Milan were left down to ten men, as Van Bommel was ejected for a last man foul, and Cesare Bovo converted the resulting penalty to double the hosts' lead. Bovo himself was ejected too shortly after for a hard tackle on Alexandre Pato. Milan, however, only managed to pull one back through Ibrahimović in injury time and they were knocked-out from the competition.

=== Matches ===
Win Draw Loss

20 January 2011 Round of 16	Milan	3–0	Bari	Milan
21:00 CET (UTC+01:00)	Ibrahimović 19'; Merkel 45+1'; Robinho 65'			Stadium: San Siro; Attendance: 9,391; Referee: Maurizio Ciampi

26 January 2011 Quarter-finals	Sampdoria	1–2	Milan	Genoa
17:30 CET (UTC+01:00)	Guberti 51'		Pato 17', 22'	Stadium: Stadio Luigi Ferraris; Attendance: 11,458; Referee: Paolo Mazzoleni

20 April 2011 Semi-finals; First leg	Milan	2–2	Palermo	Milan
20:45 CEST (UTC+02:00)	Ibrahimović 4'; Emanuelson 76'		Pastore 14'; Hernández 53'	Stadium: San Siro; Attendance: 20,022; Referee: Andrea De Marco

10 May 2011 Semi-finals; Second leg	Palermo	2–1 (4–3 agg.)	Milan	Palermo
20:45 CEST (UTC+02:00)	Migliaccio 63'; Bovo 73' (pen.)		Ibrahimović 90+4'	Stadium: Stadio Renzo Barbera; Attendance: 29,500; Referee: Gianluca Rocchi

== UEFA Champions League ==
=== Group stage ===
Milan began their UEFA Champions League campaign in the group stage after finishing in third place in the 2009–10 Serie A. Due to their UEFA coefficient, they were seeded in Pot 1 with the eight highest ranked teams. The Rossoneri were drawn in the group G alongside Spanish La Liga runners-up Real Madrid, Dutch Cup winners Ajax and French side Auxerre.

For the opening game, on 15 September, Milan played host to Auxerre at the San Siro. Despite struggling in the first half, with the visitors also hitting the crossbar once, the Rossoneri managed to get a 2–0 win, thanks to two goals by Zlatan Ibrahimović in the 66th and 69th minutes. Two weeks later, Milan traveled to the Amsterdam Arena to face Ajax. The Dutch went ahead in the 23rd minute; Luis Suárez flicked the ball through Alessandro Nesta's legs and passed it to Mounir El Hamdaoui, who stopped the ball inside the goal area, turned around and shot into the net. Shortly after, Robinho missed a good chance for Milan, as he fired wide one-on-one against goalkeeper Maarten Stekelenburg. The Rossoneri, however, managed to equalise eight minutes before half time through Ibrahimović, who chested a one-time pass by Clarence Seedorf and scored. Late in the second half, Milan nearly found the winning goal, but Kevin-Prince Boateng's angled drive was saved by Stekelenburg and the game ended 1–1.

Milan and Real Madrid's players waiting for a free kick to be taken during their group stage game at the Santiago Bernabéu Stadium.

In the third game, on 19 October, Milan suffered a 2–0 defeat against Real Madrid at the Santiago Bernabéu Stadium. The hosts took the lead in the 13th minute with a free-kick by Cristiano Ronaldo and scored again a minute later, as a shot by Mesut Özil was accidentally deflected by Daniele Bonera into his own net. The two sides met again two weeks later at the San Siro and again it was Real Madrid who took the lead, thanks to a goal by Gonzalo Higuaín in the late stages of the first half. Milan, however, managed to equalise through Filippo Inzaghi in the 68th minute. The 37-year-old striker, who had come on eight minutes earlier, headed in a cross by Zlatan Ibrahimović, after the ball was deflected by Real's goalkeeper Iker Casillas. Ten minutes later, Inzaghi scored again on a through ball by Gennaro Gattuso to put Milan ahead. But the Rossoneri were eventually denied victory, as Pedro León made it 2–2 in injury time.

For the fifth game, Milan traveled to France to take on Auxerre on Tuesday, 23 November. After a scoreless first half, Milan went ahead in the 64th minutes through Zlatan Ibrahimović, with a powerful strike from the edge of the penalty area. In injury time, Ronaldinho, who had come on a few minutes earlier, made it 2–0, following a pass from Robinho. With Real Madrid beating Ajax in Amsterdam, Milan secured a spot in the knockout stage of the competition. In the sixth and last game of the group stage two weeks later, Milan suffered a harmless 2–0 home defeat against Ajax, with second half-goals by Demy de Zeeuw and Toby Alderweireld.

Pos	Team	Pld	W	D	L	GF	GA	GD	Pts	Qualification
1	(Spain) Real Madrid	6	5	1	0	15	2	+13	16	Advance to knockout phase
2	(Italy) Milan	6	2	2	2	7	7	0	8	Advance to knockout phase
3	(Netherlands) Ajax	6	2	1	3	6	10	−4	7	Transfer to Europa League
4	(France) Auxerre	6	1	0	5	3	12	−9	3	

Source: Soccerway

Win Draw Loss

15 September 2010 1	Milan (Italy)	2–0	(France) Auxerre	Milan, Italy
20:45 CEST (UTC+02:00)	Ibrahimović 66', 69'	Report		Stadium: San Siro; Attendance: 69,317; Referee: Cristian Balaj (Romania)

28 September 2010 2	Ajax (Netherlands)	1–1	(Italy) Milan	Amsterdam, Netherlands
20:45 CEST (UTC+02:00)	El Hamdaoui 23'	Report	Ibrahimović 37'	Stadium: Amsterdam Arena; Attendance: 51,276; Referee: Felix Brych (Germany)

19 October 2010 3	Real Madrid (Spain)	2–0	(Italy) Milan	Madrid, Spain
20:45 CEST (UTC+02:00)	Ronaldo 13'; Özil 14'	Report		Stadium: Santiago Bernabéu; Attendance: 71,657; Referee: Pedro Proença (Portugal)

3 November 2010 4	Milan (Italy)	2–2	(Spain) Real Madrid	Milan, Italy
20:45 CET (UTC+01:00)	Inzaghi 68', 78'	Report	Higuaín 45'; León 90+4'	Stadium: San Siro; Attendance: 76,357; Referee: Howard Webb (England)

23 November 2010 5	Auxerre (France)	0–2	(Italy) Milan	Auxerre, France
20:45 CET (UTC+01:00)		Report	Ibrahimović 64'; Ronaldinho 90+1'	Stadium: Stade de l'Abbé-Deschamps; Attendance: 19,244; Referee: Damir Skomina (Slovenia)

8 December 2010 6	Milan (Italy)	0–2	(Netherlands) Ajax	Milan, Italy
20:45 CET (UTC+01:00)		Report	De Zeeuw 57'; Alderweireld 66'	Stadium: San Siro; Attendance: 72,960; Referee: Claus Bo Larsen (Denmark)

=== Knockout phase ===
The draw for the first knockout round took place in Nyon, Switzerland, on 17 December 2010. Milan were paired with the winners of Group A, Tottenham Hotspur. The first leg was contested at the San Siro on Tuesday, 15 February. The visitors had a couple of early occasions with Peter Crouch and Rafael van der Vaart, both saved by goalkeeper Christian Abbiati. The latter picked up an injury to his head after colliding with Crouch and had to be replaced by Marco Amelia in the 18th minute. Later on, Milan claimed a penalty, as Michael Dawson hit Zlatan Ibrahimović with his arm inside the box, but the referee allowed play to go on. The Rossoneri made little effort during the first half and shortly before half time Amelia deflected Van der Vaart's shot over the crossbar. At the start of the second half, Milan coach Massimiliano Allegri sent in Alexandre Pato to replace Clarence Seedorf. It was defender Mario Yepes, however, who posed the major threats to Tottenham: the Colombian was twice denied by goalkeeper Heurelho Gomes from goalbound headers. Milan kept pressing forward, but 10 minutes from time they were caught short on a counterattack led by Aaron Lennon, who provided the assist for Crouch's winning goal. In injury time, Ibrahimović had the equaliser disallowed for apparently pushing Dawson and the visitors eventually snapped up a 1–0 victory.

The second leg was played at White Hart Lane on Wednesday, 9 March. Having been defeated in the first-leg, Milan would have needed a win to make it through to the quarter-finals (except a 1–0 win, which would have sent the game to extra time), while a draw would have been enough for Tottenham to qualify. Therefore, despite a quick start by the hosts in the very first minutes, it was Milan who dictated much of the play in the first half and proved to be the more dangerous of the two sides. A 25-yard free-kick by Ibrahimović was saved by Gomes in the 16th minute and 9 minutes later Tottenham almost went 1–0 down when Gomes raced out of his goal to challenge Pato, who managed to fed the ball to Robinho, whose deflected shot was saved on the line by defender William Gallas. The Rossoneri kept creating chances in the second half, yet being unable to score. The game ended in a scoreless draw and Milan were knocked-out from the competition.

Win Draw Loss

==== Round of 16 ====
15 February 2011 First leg	Milan (Italy)	0–1	(England) Tottenham Hotspur	Milan, Italy
20:45 CET (UTC+01:00)		Report	Crouch 80'	Stadium: San Siro; Attendance: 75,652; Referee: Stéphane Lannoy (France)

9 March 2011 Second leg	Tottenham Hotspur (England)	0–0 (1–0 agg.)	(Italy) Milan	London, England
19:45 GMT (UTC+00:00)		Report		Stadium: White Hart Lane; Attendance: 34,320; Referee: Frank De Bleeckere (Belgium)

== Squad statistics ==
As of 22 May 2011.

No.	Pos.	Player	LA	LG	CA	CG	EA	EG	TA	TG	Yellow card	Red card
1	GK	(Italy) Marco Amelia	4	0	1	0	3	0	8	0	0	0
4	MF	(Netherlands) Mark van Bommel^{2}	14	0	2	0	0	0	15	0	5	2
5	DF	(United States) Oguchi Onyewu^{1}	0	0	0	0	0	0	0	0	0	0
7	FW	(Brazil) Alexandre Pato	25	14	3	2	5	0	33	16	4	0
8	MF	(Italy) Gennaro Gattuso	31	2	2	0	5	0	38	2	12	0
9	FW	(Italy) Filippo Inzaghi	6	2	0	0	3	2	9	4	0	0
10	MF	(Netherlands) Clarence Seedorf	30	4	2	0	8	0	40	4	2	0
11	FW	(Sweden) Zlatan Ibrahimović	29	14	4	3	8	4	41	21	10	2
13	DF	(Italy) Alessandro Nesta	26	0	2	0	7	0	35	0	4	0
14	MF	(Sierra Leone) Rodney Strasser	3	1	0	0	2	0	5	1	1	0
15	DF	(Greece) Sokratis Papastathopoulos	5	0	2	0	0	0	7	0	2	0
16	MF	(France) Mathieu Flamini	22	2	2	0	5	0	29	2	6	0
17	DF	(Italy) Massimo Oddo	7	0	3	0	0	0	10	0	2	0
18	DF	(Czech Republic) Marek Jankulovski	5	0	1	0	1	0	7	0	1	0
19	DF	(Italy) Gianluca Zambrotta	15	0	0	0	5	0	20	0	3	0
20	DF	(Italy) Ignazio Abate	29	0	2	0	6	0	37	0	2	1
21	MF	(Italy) Andrea Pirlo	17	1	3	0	5	0	25	1	3	0
22	DF	(Uruguay) Bruno Montelongo^{1}	0	0	0	0	0	0	0	0	0	0
22	FW	(Italy) Marco Borriello^{1}	1	0	0	0	0	0	1	0	0	0
23	MF	(Italy) Massimo Ambrosini (c)	18	1	1	0	4	0	23	1	6	0
25	DF	(Italy) Daniele Bonera	16	0	1	0	3	0	20	0	4	0
27	MF	(Ghana) Kevin-Prince Boateng	26	3	1	0	7	0	34	3	11	0
28	MF	(Netherlands) Urby Emanuelson^{2}	9	0	2	1	0	0	11	1	0	0
30	GK	(Italy) Flavio Roma	1	0	2	0	0	0	3	0	0	0
32	GK	(Italy) Christian Abbiati	35	0	1	0	6	0	42	0	2	0
33	DF	(Brazil) Thiago Silva	33	1	3	0	6	0	42	1	1	0
35	DF	(Spain) Dídac Vilà^{2}	1	0	0	0	0	0	1	0	0	0
51	FW	(Italy) Giacomo Beretta	1	0	0	0	0	0	1	0	0	0
52	MF	(Germany) Alexander Merkel	6	0	2	1	2	0	10	1	1	0
66	DF	(Italy) Nicola Legrottaglie^{2}	1	0	0	0	0	0	1	0	0	0
70	FW	(Brazil) Robinho	34	14	4	1	7	0	45	15	3	0
76	DF	(Colombia) Mario Yepes	13	0	2	0	2	0	17	0	2	0
77	DF	(Italy) Luca Antonini	22	0	4	0	6	0	32	0	4	0
80	FW	(Brazil) Ronaldinho^{1}	11	0	0	0	5	1	16	1	0	0
90	FW	(Nigeria) Nnamdi Oduamadi	1	0	0	0	0	0	1	0	0	0
99	FW	(Italy) Antonio Cassano^{2}	17	4	4	0	0	0	21	4	0	1
—	—	Own goals	—	2	—	0	—	0	—	2	—	—
Team total			38	65	4	8	8	7	50	80	91	6

^{1} Player left the club during the season
^{2} Player joined the club during the January transfer window

== Transfers ==
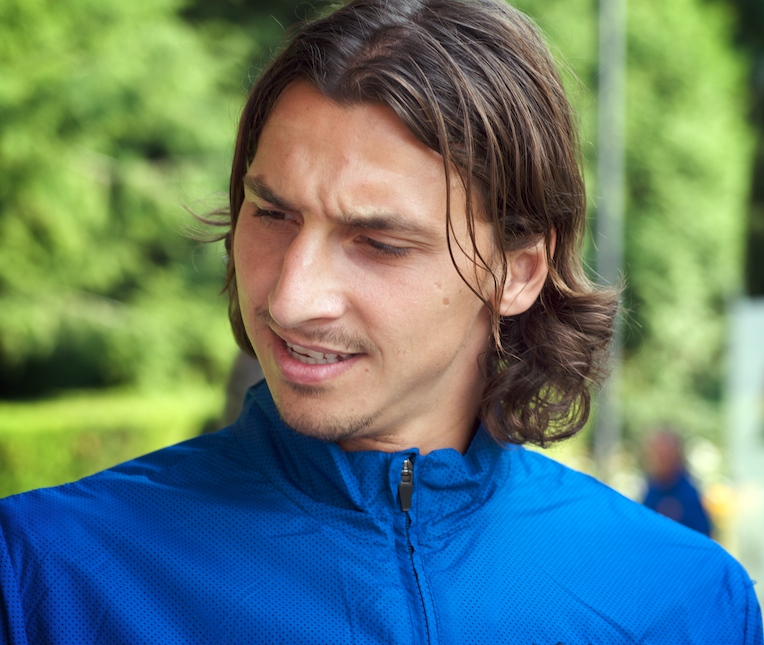
Zlatan Ibrahimović was Milan's major signing in the summer transfer window.

Milan trod carefully in the early stages of the transfer window, as CEO Adriano Galliani stated that any new signing would only follow a departure. Marco Amelia and Mario Yepes joined the club to replace Dida and Giuseppe Favalli respectively, whose contracts expired. The Rossoneri went on to sign Sokratis Papastathopoulos for an undisclosed fee from Genoa, who also took on co-ownership of youngsters Rodney Strasser, Nnamdi Oduamadi and Gianmarco Zigoni as part of the deal – though only the latter actually left Milan.

After the first couple of pre-season games, head coach Massimiliano Allegri lamented the need of one more midfielder. This led to the purchase of German-Ghanaian Kevin-Prince Boateng on another co-ownership deal with Genoa, who had just signed him from Portsmouth; Genoa also took on co-ownership of Giacomo Beretta as part of the deal, though he remained in Milan's youth team.

As the last week of the transfer window approached, director general Ariedo Braida revealed that Milan might be interested in signing Swedish star Zlatan Ibrahimović from Barcelona. Despite initially claiming that it was nothing more than a "dream", Galliani later confirmed that negotiations were actually taking place. After some days of talks, on 29 August Milan officially announced to have signed Ibrahimović on a free loan with the option to fully purchase the athlete's playing rights for €24 million at the end of the season.

On the last day before the summer transfer deadline, Milan made another major signing, securing Robinho from Manchester City. The move cost €18 million plus bonuses and was hailed by Galliani as "a wonderful gift from owner Silvio Berlusconi". At the same time, three players left the club: Kakha Kaladze and Klaas-Jan Huntelaar moved to Genoa and Schalke 04 respectively, while Marco Borriello was loaned out to Roma.

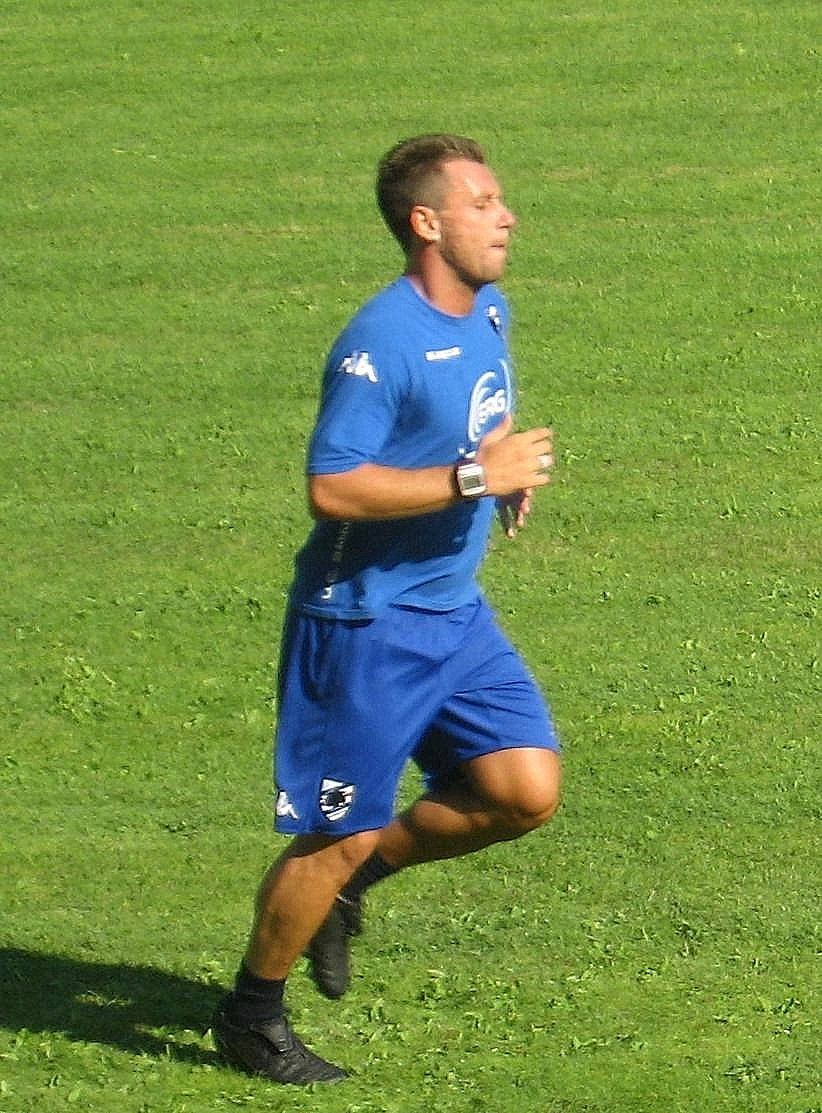
Antonio Cassano

As the January transfer window approached, Galliani stated that Milan was in talks with Sampdoria to sign striker Antonio Cassano, who was dropped from the squad in October following an argument with Sampdoria president Riccardo Garrone. The move was later confirmed by Milan owner Silvio Berlusconi and Cassano joined the Rossoneri for their winter camp in Dubai on 27 December. His transfer was officially finalized on 3 January, the opening day of the winter transfer window.

Meanwhile, speculation about Ronaldinho leaving the club increased. These rumors were confirmed by Ronaldinho himself during a press conference he held in Rio de Janeiro alongside Galliani, on 6 January. The new club was unveiled five days later, as Milan officially announced Ronaldinho's move to Flamengo. At the same time, defender Oguchi Onyewu also left Milan, joining Dutch Eredivisie champions Twente on loan for the remainder of the season.

Milan went on to complete two more signings in the second half of January, bringing in Dutch duo of left winger Urby Emanuelson and midfielder Mark van Bommel, from Ajax and Bayern Munich respectively. The Rossoneri, however, made another couple of additions in the last days of the transfer window, signing Spanish left back Dídac Vilà from Espanyol and centre back Nicola Legrottaglie from Juventus.

=== In ===
Date	Pos.	Player	Moving from	Fee	Notes
18 March 2010	DF	Mario Yepes	Chievo	Free	Effective from 1 July
17 June 2010	DF	Elia Legati	Crotone	Undisclosed	Co-ownership resolved
23 June 2010	GK	Marco Amelia	Genoa	Loan	Effective from 1 July
24 June 2010	GK	Ferdinando Coppola	Atalanta	Undisclosed	Co-ownership resolved
16 July 2010	DF	Cristian Daminuță	Internazionale	Undisclosed	
16 July 2010	MF	Attila Filkor	Internazionale	Undisclosed	
20 July 2010	DF	Sokratis Papastathopoulos	Genoa	Undisclosed	
18 August 2010	MF	Kevin-Prince Boateng	Genoa	Undisclosed	Co-ownership deal
27 August 2010	DF	Bruno Montelongo	River Plate	Loan	
28 August 2010	FW	Zlatan Ibrahimović	Barcelona	Loan	Option to fully purchase for €24M
31 August 2010	FW	Robinho	Manchester City	€18M + bonuses	
3 January 2011	FW	Antonio Cassano	Sampdoria	Undisclosed	
23 January 2011	MF	Urby Emanuelson	Ajax	Undisclosed	
25 January 2011	MF	Mark van Bommel	Bayern Munich	Undisclosed	
28 January 2011	DF	Dídac Vilà	Espanyol	Undisclosed	
31 January 2011	DF	Nicola Legrottaglie	Juventus	Free	

=== Out ===
Date	Pos.	Player	Moving to	Fee	Notes
23 June 2010	GK	Marco Storari	Juventus	€4.5M	Effective from 1 July
1 July 2010	GK	Dida	Unattached	Free	
1 July 2010	DF	Giuseppe Favalli	Retired	—	
1 July 2010	MF	David Beckham	LA Galaxy	End of loan spell	
1 July 2010	FW	Mancini	Internazionale	End of loan spell	
6 July 2010	DF	Matteo Bruscagin	Grosseto	Undisclosed	Co-ownership deal
7 July 2010	MF	Federico Furlan	Varese	Undisclosed	Co-ownership deal
7 July 2010	MF	Wilfred Osuji	Varese	Undisclosed	Co-ownership deal
12 July 2010	DF	Matteo Darmian	Palermo	Undisclosed	Co-ownership deal
15 July 2010	DF	Elia Legati	Padova	Undisclosed	Co-ownership deal
20 July 2010	FW	Gianmarco Zigoni	Genoa	Undisclosed	Co-ownership deal
3 August 2010	MF	Jordan Pedrocchi	Chievo	Undisclosed	Co-ownership deal
31 August 2010	DF	Kakha Kaladze	Genoa	Undisclosed	
31 August 2010	FW	Klaas-Jan Huntelaar	Schalke 04	Undisclosed	
11 January 2011	FW	Ronaldinho	Flamengo	Undisclosed	
26 January 2011	FW	Willy Aubameyang	Kilmarnock	Undisclosed	
26 January 2011	FW	Alberto Paloschi	Genoa	Undisclosed	Co-ownership deal

=== Out on loan ===
Date	Pos.	Player	Moving to	Until	Notes
30 June 2010	GK	Ferdinando Coppola	Siena	30 June 2011	Effective from 1 July
1 July 2010	DF	Marcus Diniz	Parma	25 August 2010	Terminated early
6 July 2010	DF	Digão	Penafiel	30 June 2011	
6 July 2010	FW	Pierre Aubameyang	Monaco	30 June 2011	Option to fully purchase
12 July 2010	MF	Matteo Barbini	Sacilese	30 June 2011	
13 July 2010	GK	Mattia Maggioni	Monza	30 June 2011	
15 July 2010	FW	Davide Di Gennaro	Padova	30 June 2011	Option to purchase in co-ownership
16 July 2010	GK	Antonio Donnarumma	Piacenza	30 June 2011	
17 July 2010	GK	Filippo Perucchini	Fano	30 June 2011	
18 July 2010	MF	Giovanni Scampini	Pisa	30 June 2011	
20 July 2010	DF	Luca Meregalli	Pro Vercelli	30 June 2011	
21 July 2010	GK	Michał Miśkiewicz	Crociati Noceto	30 June 2011	
21 July 2010	DF	Simone Romagnoli	Foggia	30 June 2011	
21 July 2010	MF	Gianmarco Conti	Fano	30 June 2011	
21 July 2010	FW	Andrea Schenetti	Lucchese	28 January 2011	Terminated early
23 July 2010	MF	Harmony Ikande	Poggibonsi	31 January 2011	Terminated early
6 August 2010	MF	Attila Filkor	Triestina	30 June 2011	
25 August 2010	DF	Marcus Diniz	Eupen	30 June 2011	
25 August 2010	FW	Dominic Adiyiah	Reggina	31 January 2011	Terminated early
31 August 2010	DF	Cristian Daminuță	L'Aquila	30 June 2011	
31 August 2010	FW	Willy Aubameyang	Monza	26 January 2011	Terminated early
31 August 2010	FW	Marco Borriello	Roma	30 June 2011	Obligation to fully purchase for €10M
11 January 2011	DF	Oguchi Onyewu	Twente	30 June 2011	
26 January 2011	DF	Bruno Montelongo	Bologna	30 June 2011	
31 January 2011	MF	Harmony Ikande	Extremadura	30 June 2011	
31 January 2011	FW	Andrea Schenetti	Prato	30 June 2011	
1 February 2011	FW	Dominic Adiyiah	Partizan	30 June 2011	
