= Barbini =

Barbini is an Italian surname. Notable people with the surname include:

- Alfredo Barbini (1912–2007), Italian glass artist
- Giovanni Barbini (1901–1998), Italian naval officer
- Marco Barbini (born 1990), Italian rugby union player
- Matteo Barbini (born 1982), Italian rugby player
- Matteo Barbini (born 1991), Italian professional footballer
- William (Bill) Barbini (born 1947), American violinist

Other:

- Barbini (fish), fish genus from Cyprinidae family
