= Meregalli =

Meregalli is an Italian surname. Notable people with the surname include:

- Guido Meregalli (1894–1959), Italian racing driver
- Luca Meregalli (born 1991), Italian footballer
