= Alexandre Pato =

Brazilian footballer (born 1989)

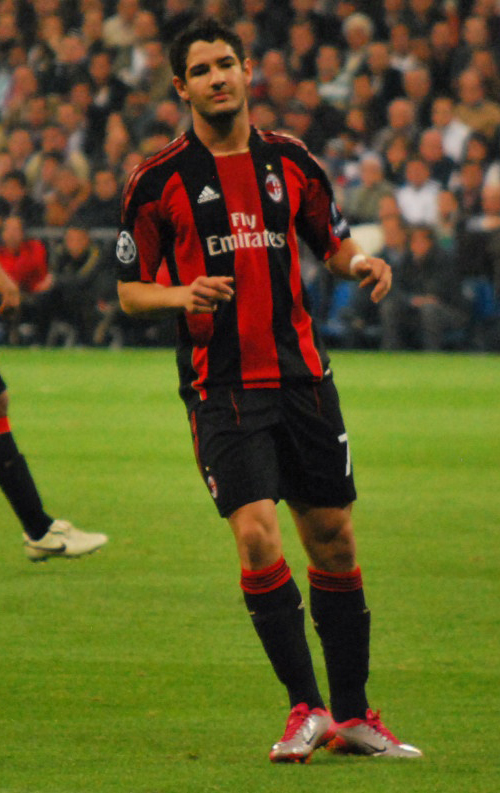
- Pato playing for AC Milan in 2010

Personal information
- Full name: Alexandre Rodrigues da Silva
- Date of birth: 2 September 1989 (age 37)
- Place of birth: Pato Branco, Brazil
- Height: 1.80 m (5 ft 11 in)
- Position: Forward

Team information
- Current team: Northampton Town (director)

Youth career
- 2000–2006: Internacional

Senior career*
Years	Team	Apps	(Gls)
2006–2007	Internacional	18	(7)
2007–2013	AC Milan	117	(51)
2013–2016	Corinthians	49	(14)
2014–2015	→ São Paulo (loan)	76	(27)
2016	→ Chelsea (loan)	2	(1)
2016–2017	Villarreal	14	(2)
2017–2019	Tianjin Tianhai	47	(30)
2019–2020	São Paulo	31	(8)
2021–2022	Orlando City	26	(3)
2023	São Paulo	9	(2)
Total		389	(145)

International career
2007	Brazil U20	12	(8)
2008–2012	Brazil U23	9	(3)
2008–2013	Brazil	27	(10)
Medal record
Men's football
Representing Brazil
FIFA Confederations Cup
Winner	2009 South Africa
Olympic Games
Silver medal – second place	2012 London	Team
Bronze medal – third place	2008 Beijing	Team
South American Youth Championship
Winner	2007 Paraguay
- * Club domestic league appearances and goals

Alexandre Rodrigues da Silva (Brazilian Portuguese pronunciation: [aleˈʃɐ̃dɾi ʁoˈdɾiɡiz dɐ ˈsiwvɐ]; born 2 September 1989), commonly known as Alexandre Pato (pronounced [ˈpatu]) or simply Pato, is a Brazilian football executive and former player who played as a striker and could also operate as a second striker or winger. He is currently a director of EFL League Two club Northampton Town.

Pato began his career as a youth player for Internacional in 2000, making his debut in 2006 at age 16. He went on to score 12 goals in 27 appearances and helped them win the 2006 FIFA Club World Cup. In August 2007, he signed for Italian side AC Milan. In 2009, he scored 18 goals in 42 matches in all competitions, which earned him both the Golden Boy and Serie A Young Footballer of the Year awards. During the 2010–11 season, he helped Milan win the Serie A, where he was the club's joint top scorer with 14 goals in 25 games. In January 2013, Pato returned to Brazil, signing for €15 million with Corinthians, where he won the Campeonato Paulista. In 2014, Pato joined São Paulo on a two-year loan deal, where he played 95 games, scoring 38 goals for the club. In January 2016, Pato transferred to English Premier League club Chelsea on a loan deal before going to Spanish side Villarreal that same year. In 2017, he signed for Chinese club Tianjin Tianhai, and in 2019 went back to São Paulo.

A full international for Brazil since 2008, Pato was part of their squads which won the 2009 FIFA Confederations Cup and competed at the 2011 Copa América. He also won two consecutive Olympic medals for the country, a bronze in 2008, and silver in 2012.

== Club career ==
=== Internacional ===
Pato started his career at Internacional's youth teams, gaining a lot of visibility on his skills, strength and technique. At 16, he was already playing in the Brazilian under-20 championship, where Inter defeated Grêmio 4–0 in the final. Pato was that tournament's top scorer.

Pato signed his first professional contract with Internacional to compete in the Brazilian championship of 2006 with the first team. At the age of 17, in November that same year, his debut finally happened at the Estádio Palestra Itália against São Paulo team Palmeiras for the Campeonato Brasileiro. Alexandre Pato met and surpassed any and all expectations of what was expected of him as he scored his first professional goal within the first minute of the game. The rest of his participation was spent dribbling and confusing defenders as he made two assists (and almost scoring another himself) to help Internacional rout Palmeiras 4–1. He was substituted off in the 77th minute.

Pato was included in the Internacional squad that won the 2006 FIFA Club World Cup. He scored against Egyptian club Al Ahly in the semi-finals. At the age of 17 years and 102 days, this made Pato the youngest goalscorer at a senior men's FIFA tournament. He broke the record of Pelé, who was 17 years and 239 days old when he scored against Wales at the 1958 FIFA World Cup.

Keeping up with his promising figure, Pato debuted at the Campeonato Gaúcho on 24 February against Veranópolis and scored a goal in the 2–1 victory. He also debuted in Copa Libertadores on 28 February against Emelec of Ecuador (also his first game at Beira-Rio) and scored once during the 3–0 thumping. But the biggest highlight of Pato's time with Internacional was during the Recopa Sudamericana, as he helped Internacional win their first ever title of that competition. Against Pachuca of Mexico, he scored one goal in the 2–1 defeat in Mexico. But, on the return game on 7 June, and with more than 51,000 Colorados present, Pato had a great performance as he scored once to lead the team to win their third international title.

=== AC Milan ===
==== 2007–2010: Breakthrough seasons ====
Incumbent European champions AC Milan of the Italian Serie A officially confirmed the signing of Pato on 2 August 2007 for a fee of about €24 million.

Due to FIFA football regulations regarding non-EU minors, Pato was unable to play official matches for Milan until 3 January 2008, when the Italian transfer window and registration reopened. Milan, however, were allowed to include the player in friendlies and training beginning 3 September 2007, one day after his 18th birthday. Pato made his non-competitive debut in a 2–2 draw against Dynamo Kyiv on 7 September 2007 and scored a header. On 4 January 2008, Pato's transfer to Milan became official.

Pato scored his first Milan goal on his Serie A debut against Napoli in a 5–2 home victory on 13 January 2008. He scored his first brace for Milan, in a 2–0 victory over Genoa at the San Siro on 27 January. He finished the 2007–08 season with 9 goals in 20 appearances (18 in the league).

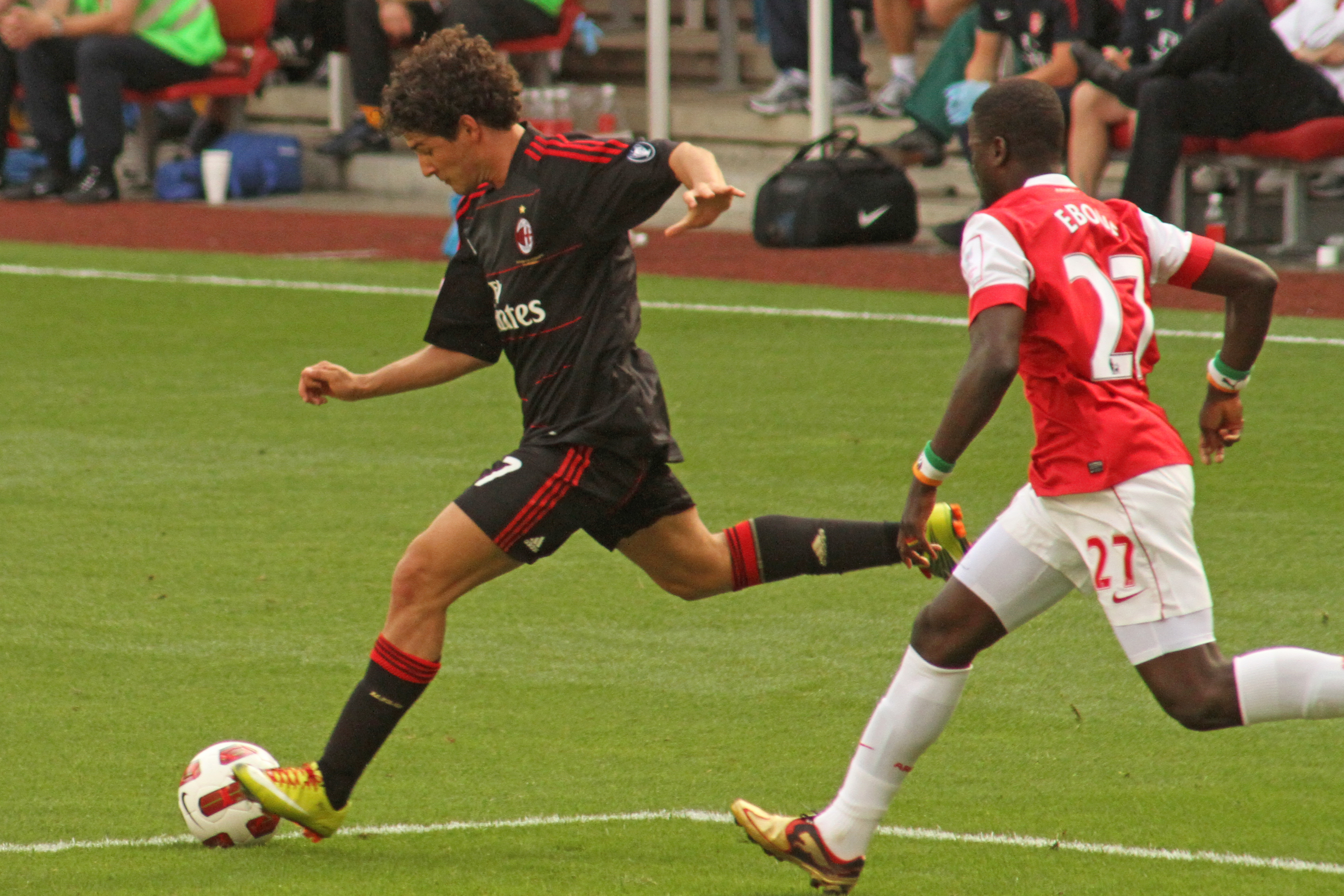
Pato (left) playing for AC Milan in 2010

In late 2008, Pato scored two goals in Milan's 5–1 win over Udinese just before the Christmas break, and managed to shine again with a brace against Roma the following matchday at the Stadio Olimpico on 11 January 2009, proving that he is a vital part of Milan's attack. He continued his impressive form for Milan, hitting six goals in four games, including a game winning strike against Fiorentina on 18 January. On 15 February, he scored his 11th goal of the season in a 2–1 defeat against home rivals Internazionale. On 26 February, Pato scored his 12th goal of the season against Werder Bremen in the UEFA Cup, a game Milan drew 2–2; but with this, were knocked out the competition on the away goals rule. Pato continued his good form with two goals against Siena on 15 March. Pato finished the 2008–09 season as Milan's top goalscorer with 18 goals.

On 22 August 2009, in the first Serie A match of the 2009–10 season, Pato scored a goal in each half during the 2–1 win against Siena. Around two months later, on 21 October 2009, during matchday three of the Champions league group stage, Pato scored two second-half goals in a 3–2 win against Real Madrid at the Santiago Bernabéu Stadium. He has since played at the right wing in a 4–3–3 formation. On 18 January 2010, Pato was awarded the 2009 Serie A Young Footballer of the Year award at the Oscar del Calcio ceremony, becoming the first Brazilian to be awarded with the title. On his return to the team from injury, Pato scored a goal in each of Milan's next three games against Udinese, Bari and Fiorentina. On 28 February, he scored a brace in the first half at the San Siro, helping Milan beat Atalanta 3–1 but coming off halfway through the second half due to a hamstring injury. This injury forced him to miss two crucial trips to Roma and Manchester United. In an unfortunate conclusion to Pato's season, he injured the same muscle again shortly after returning and was forced to miss the rest of the season, playing only 20 games due to constant injuries.

==== 2011–2013: Injury problems ====
In the first match of the season against Lecce, he scored two goals in Milan's 4–0 win. However, he found himself on the treatment table after his second match of the season, which ruled him out for the next three matches. In his next full match after his injury, he scored twice against Chievo at the San Siro, returning to his position as a striker in a 4–3–1–2 formation. He then scored once again against Bari at the Stadio San Nicola. After a string of great performances, Pato injured his hamstring for the third time in less than a year. This injury ruled him out for six weeks.

On 9 January, he scored his first two goals of 2011 to help Milan draw 4–4 against Udinese after going down 3–1. On 26 January, he scored two goals helping Milan to win 2–1 against Sampdoria in Coppa Italia. On 6 February he scored a goal against Genoa helping Milan to draw 1–1. Another remarkable goal came on 20 February when he scored the winner in a 2–1 away victory over Chievo, by dribbling in between two defenders and finishing with a shot off the post. He scored the third goal after assisting Kevin-Prince Boateng in a 3–0 victory over Napoli on 28 February. With fellow striker Zlatan Ibrahimović suspended for the Derby della Madonnina with Internazionale, Pato's two goals saw Milan secure their much needed three points. He dedicated his brace to his supporters. Assisted by Boateng, he scored the second goal in a 2–1 away win against Fiorentina on 10 April.

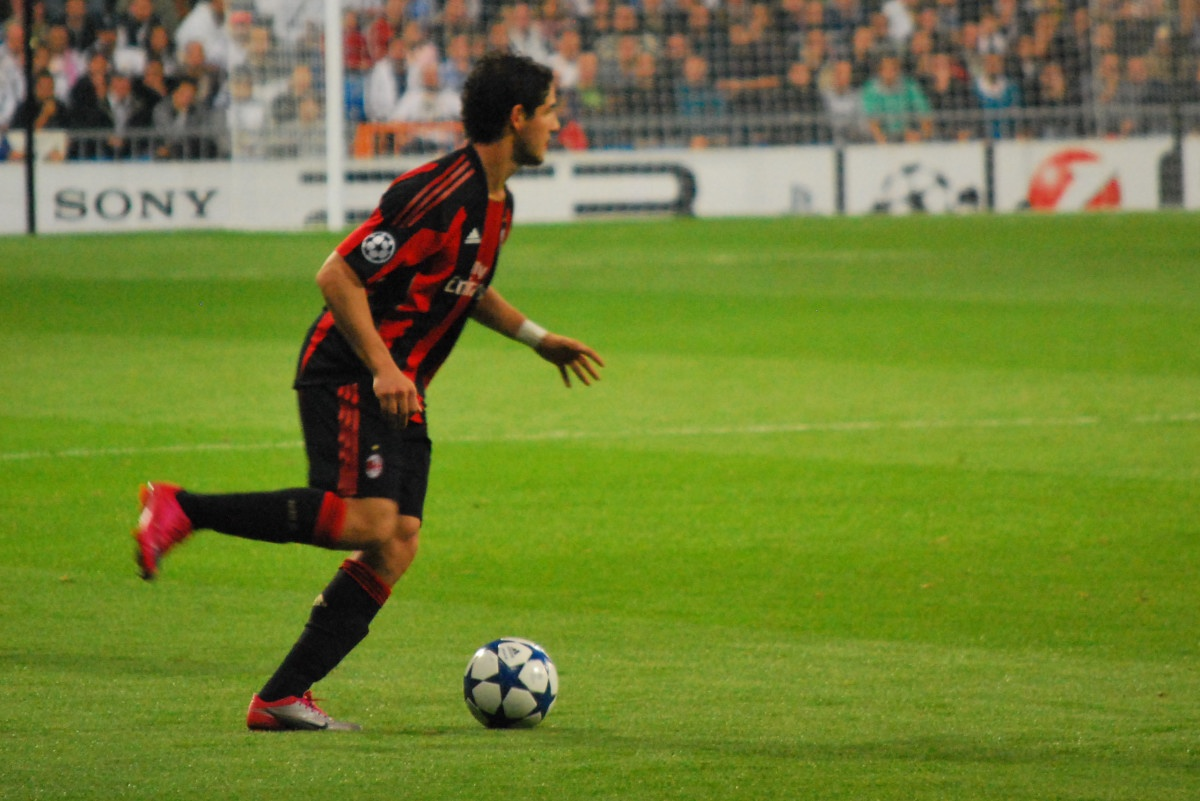
Pato playing for Milan in 2010

On 13 September, in a Champions League group-stage match against Barcelona, Pato scored the fifth-fastest goal in the competition's history, 24 seconds after kick-off. Later that month, he suffered a thigh injury during a 1–1 draw with Udinese. Pato made his return as a sub against Fiorentina and hit the post in the 79th minute in a 0–0 draw. He then scored and won a penalty in a 4–0 win against Chievo and in midweek, scored against Viktoria Plzeň and setup Robinho in a 2–2 draw. He started against Bologna the next week in a 2–2 draw. In January 2012, Pato was on the brink of moving to French Ligue 1 side Paris Saint-Germain. This move would have given Milan the opportunity to make a bid for Manchester City's Carlos Tevez. On 12 January, however, Pato refused the transfer, citing his commitment to Milan. During the Coppa Italia round of 16 victory over Novara, Pato picked up a muscle strain in his thigh, which tests revealed an injury of his biceps femoris of his left thigh, resulting in him missing the remainder of the season.

Before the start of the new season, Pato switched to the squad number 9, as Filippo Inzaghi had retired at the end of the 2011–12 season. In the third training session of the season, he injured his thigh and was kept out for the first six weeks of the new season. On 21 October 2012, Pato made his return to Milan, in which he assisted Stephan El Shaarawy for the second goal in a 3–2 away defeat to Lazio. On 6 November 2012, in a Champions League group stage match, Pato scored his first goal of the season with a header in a 1–1 draw against Málaga. He scored for the last time for Milan in the Champions League against Anderlecht on 21 November 2012. Due to his poor performances throughout the 2011–12 season, Pato was awarded the 2012 Bidone d'oro, a satirical prize, which is given to the worst Serie A player during a particular season.

=== Corinthians ===
On 3 January 2013, Pato signed for Corinthians for a fee of €15 million on a four-year deal. His debut for the club occurred against Oeste, with Pato scoring on his first touch on the ball after a pass by Paulinho, maintaining his reputation of scoring in his debut matches. On 27 February 2013, in the Copa Libertadores, he scored against Colombian team Millonarios with a volley from a cross.

In May 2013, however, Pato was criticized by fans of Corinthians, after he missed two open goals against Goiás. The forward was defended by his coach Tite. According to the manager, "This pressure comes from his high transfer fee. But football is not only about money. If it was just about money, we would not have won Libertadores last year."

On 6 June, after Corinthians lost to Cruzeiro 1–0, Pato was criticised again by Fiel, the largest Corinthians supporters' club. He missed four goal chances, and once again was defended by Tite. According to the coach: "He's improved in precision. I asked for this after the game against Ponte Preta: 'Target for goal'. Considering he shot in the direction of the goal and the rival goalkeeper had a good game, the coach is going to award recognition. I always look at the other side. It is necessary to recognise that Fábio had a very happy game, it was his merit. If Pato had missed, I would ask him to improve. But today was Fábio's merit."

On 7 July, after Emerson Sheik's and Danilo's injuries and ten games without a goal, Pato was in the 11-team of Alvinegro and scored twice in Corinthians' victory against Bahia.

On 24 October, Pato missed a final penalty in a penalty shootout against Grêmio that saw his Corinthians team knocked out of the Copa do Brasil. He attempted a panenka chip down the middle but got no power behind the shot, and it was easily caught by Grêmio goalkeeper and former Milan teammate Dida.

On 2 December, It was reported that Pato was subject of a £6.6m bid from Premier League club Arsenal, however Corinthians rejected the offer as it was short of their £10m asking price.

==== Loan to São Paulo ====
On 5 February 2014, Pato moved to São Paulo in exchange for Jádson moving to Corinthians. While Jádson moved to Corinthians permanently, Pato transferred to Tricolor until December 2015, during which time half of his salary (R$400,000) would continue to be paid by Corinthians. If Pato received a proposal in June or July, when the transfer window re-opened in Europe, he would be negotiated to cover Corinthians investment of €15 million.

According to Pato's agent, Gilmar Veloz, he left Corinthians because Mano Menezes, the new coach of club, contrary to Tite, his predecessor, did not want Pato at the club. Menezes preferred a midfielder, therefore Jádson, who was sitting on the bench at São Paulo, went the opposite way. In Veloz's words, "He [Pato] stayed with no place with new coach [Menezes], who wanted Jádson and did not want Pato. He had other plans, another tactical system in his mind. Pato was not important for Mano's scheme." On 10 April 2014, in his second game for São Paulo, Pato scored his first goal for his new club, against CSA. He had made his debut in the second round of the Brazilian Cup in the first leg match against Alagoano. In a 3–0 victory in the second leg, Pato scored the first goal of the game, after an assist coming from Maicon.

==== Loan to Chelsea ====
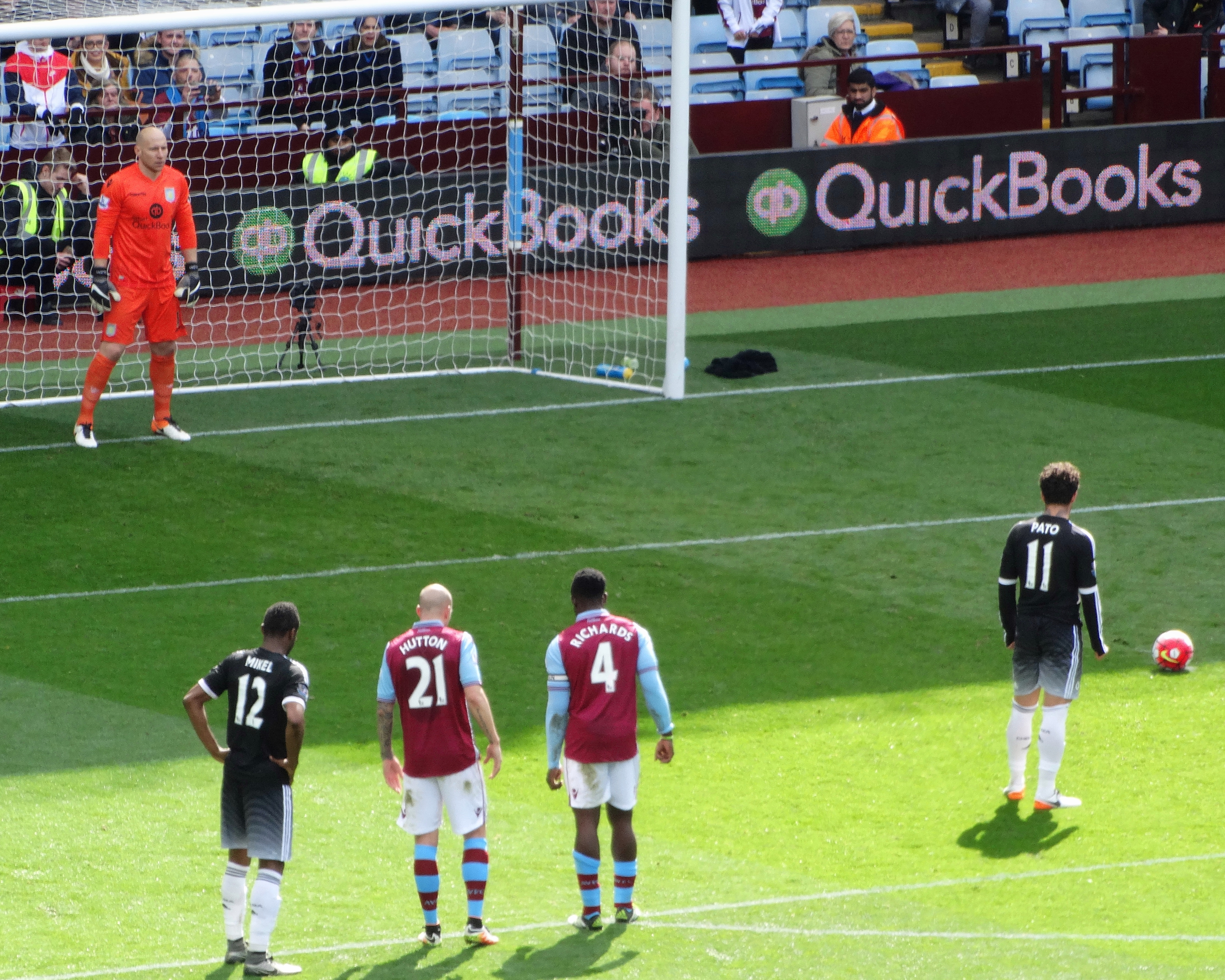
Pato taking a penalty on his debut for Chelsea in 2016

Without any transfer offers, Pato returned to Corinthians after his loan ended.

On 26 January 2016, Pato flew to London to undergo a medical at English Premier League side Chelsea. Three days later, Chelsea announced the signing of Pato on loan from the Brazilian club, until the end of the 2015–16 season. Upon signing, Pato said, "I am so happy to sign for Chelsea. It is a dream for me. I am looking forward to meeting and getting to know my new team-mates and cannot wait to play."

On 2 April, he made his debut away to Aston Villa as a 23rd-minute substitute for the injured Loïc Rémy; in first-half added time, he won a penalty when fouled by Aly Cissokho and converted it past Brad Guzan for the second goal of a 4–0 win. He became the sixth Brazilian to score on his Premier League debut, with teammate Willian among the others. After a season with only two appearances, Chelsea decided not to sign Pato and he returned to Corinthians.

=== Villarreal ===
On 26 July 2016, Corinthians confirmed the transfer of Pato to La Liga club Villarreal, with 60% of his federative rights being bought for a fee of €3 million. He scored on his club debut, in a 2–1 home defeat to Monaco in a Champions League play-off match on 17 August. He made his La Liga debut with the club in a 1–1 away draw against Granada on 20 August. In the club's opening UEFA Europa League group match of the season on 15 September, Pato scored and assisted a goal as Villarreal came from behind to defeat Zürich 2–1 at home.

=== Tianjin Quanjian ===
On 30 January 2017, Pato transferred to Chinese club Tianjin Quanjian for a €18 million transfer fee to play under Italian coach Fabio Cannavaro.

On 4 March 2017, Pato made his debut for Quanjian in a 2–0 loss to Guangzhou R&F, where he missed several chances for the newly promoted side. A week later he missed an 88th-minute penalty kick in a 1–1 draw with Shanghai Greenland Shenhua, denying Quanjian its first ever Chinese Super League win.

=== Return to São Paulo ===
On 27 March 2019, Pato returned to São Paulo. After his signing, the club announced him under the phrase: "Aqui o coração bate mais forte" (Here, the heart beats stronger), in an allusion to Pato's goal celebrations, when he beats the left side of his chest. He signed a deal until the end of 2022.

On 19 August 2020, Pato reached an agreement with São Paulo for the termination of his contract, ending his second stint at the club with nine goals scored in 35 appearances.

=== Orlando City ===
Having teased his arrival with a series of duck-themed social media posts the day before, MLS side Orlando City announced the arrival of Pato as a free agent signing on a one-year contract ahead of the 2021 season on 13 February 2021. He made his club debut on 17 April, starting in the team's season opener at home against Atlanta United but was forced off injured in the 80th minute of the goalless draw. He underwent arthroscopic surgery on his right knee in May as a result of the injury. After setbacks during his recovery, Pato made his second Orlando City appearance 187 days after his first, entering as an 86th-minute substitute on 20 October 2021 in a 1–1 draw with CF Montréal. He finished the season with 116 minutes played in five appearances across all competitions. Ahead of the 2022 season, Pato re-signed with Orlando on a one-year contract. On 14 November 2022, as part of the team's end of season roster decisions, it was announced Orlando was not in discussions with Pato to renew his contract for the 2023 campaign.

=== Second return to São Paulo ===
On 26 May 2023, Pato rejoined São Paulo on a deal running until December 2023, with the option for an extension until December 2024. However, he would let his contract expire in December 2023 and would leave the club.

== International career ==
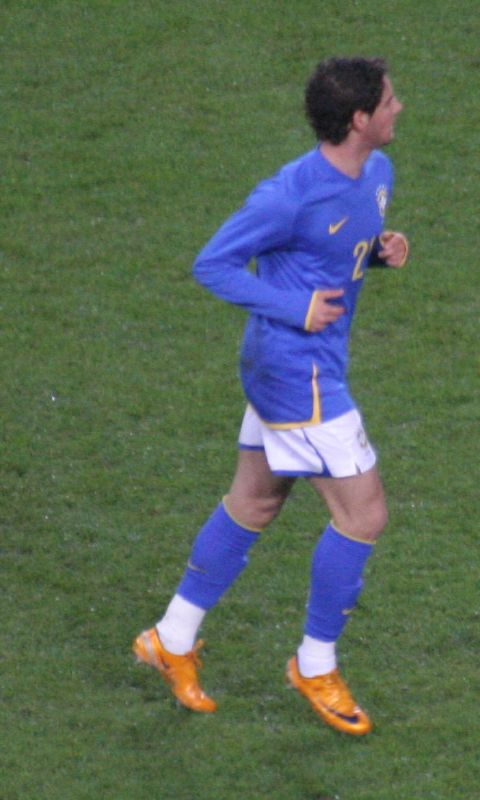
Pato playing for Brazil in 2008

After gaining prominence at club level, Pato was called up for the youth teams of Brazil. He helped Brazil win the 2007 South American Youth Championship, which qualified the country for the 2007 FIFA U-20 World Cup, and was selected by Brazil coach Dunga for the 2008 Summer Olympics. He scored his first goal for the senior Brazilian team on his debut against Sweden at the Emirates Stadium, London, on 26 March 2008, beating Pelé's record of scoring a goal within seconds of his full international debut.

He took part at the 2009 Confederations Cup in South Africa, where he played only in the first round match against Egypt. However, he was not called by Dunga to play in the 2010 World Cup.

Pato became a regular under new coach Mano Menezes, wearing the number 9 jersey. He scored a goal in Brazil's 2–0 friendly win over the United States on 10 August 2010. He scored the second goal in Brazil's 3–0 win against Iran on 7 October 2010. Pato's success in the Brazil national team continued as he again scored in a friendly match against Ukraine, where they won 2–0.

Pato also participated in the 2011 Copa América, and scored a brace in the group stage against Ecuador.

Pato was named to the Brazil Olympic Football team for the London 2012 Olympics. He scored his nation's opening goal against Belarus at Old Trafford from a header, as Brazil came from behind to win the match 3–1.

On 15 August 2012, Pato scored twice as Brazil beat Sweden 3–0 in the final international match at the Råsunda Stadium in Stockholm. He entered in the 76th, scored on a header in the 85th and converted a penalty kick two minutes later after a foul by Pontus Wernbloom.

== Style of play ==
A quick, agile, and creative forward, Pato was regarded as a promising young footballer in his youth. Former managers Dunga and Carlo Ancelotti compared his ability to that of Brazilian attacking players such as Careca, Kaká, Romário and Ronaldo. A versatile forward, he was capable of playing across the front line, including as a striker, supporting forward, or winger. Despite being predominantly right-footed, he was able to strike the ball with both feet, dribble past opponents, create chances for teammates, and contribute in aerial situations.

In 2010, Don Balón listed him as one of the 100 most talented young players born after 1989. As his career progressed with Milan, however, he suffered numerous recurring injuries which affected his pace, fitness, consistency and mobility, and which limited his amount of playing time at a young age. As a result, he is regarded by some in the media to have failed to live up to his initial potential. His goal celebration would often see him make a 'heart' gesture.

== Personal life ==
Pato said in an interview with the Brazilian television program Esporte Espetacular that, at age 11, he broke his arm. Doctors found a tumor in the arm and feared that it needed to be amputated. His surgery to remove the tumor was successful, however.

In 2007, Pato was engaged to Brazilian actress Sthefany Brito. They mutually split up in January 2009. They got back together, and married on 7 July 2009 in a ceremony at the Copacabana Palace in Rio de Janeiro. The marriage lasted less than 10 months; the couple divorced on 21 April 2010, with Brito citing Pato's constant partying as the reason for their split. In 2010, he had a brief romance with Miss Brazil 2010, Débora Lyra.

On 2 July 2013, after two-and-a-half-year relationship, Pato broke up with girlfriend Barbara Berlusconi, a director of AC Milan and daughter of club owner Silvio Berlusconi. At the end of 2014, Pato began dating Brazilian actress, model, and television presenter Fiorella Mattheis. They separated on 4 July 2017.

He is currently married to Rebeca Abravanel, television presenter and the daughter of SBT owner Silvio Santos.

Pato is a Christian. After going to church once with Rebeca Abravanel before they were married, Pato described the impact it had on him by saying: "Man, it was a revelation. The Bible had all the answers I was looking for. I turned my head to the sky and said, 'Lord, I no longer want this life.' That day my life changed forever."

In November 2024, he began his career as a sports commentator on SBT. In September 2026, Pato was part of a consortium that purchased English football club Northampton Town; he took a seat on the board as a director as a result.

== Career statistics ==
=== Club ===
Appearances and goals by club, season and competition
Team	Season	League			State league (Note: Includes Campeonato Gaúcho, Campeonato Paulista)		National cup (Note: Includes Coppa Italia, Copa do Brasil, Copa del Rey, Chinese FA Cup, U.S. Open Cup)		Continental		Other		Total	
Team	Season	Division	Apps	Goals	Apps	Goals	Apps	Goals	Apps	Goals	Apps	Goals	Apps	Goals
Internacional	2006	Série A	1	1	0	0	0	0	0	0	2 (Note: Appearances in FIFA Club World Cup)	1	3	2
Internacional	2007	Série A	9	5	8	1	0	0	5 (Note: Appearances in Copa Libertadores)	2	2 (Note: Appearance(s) in Recopa Sudamericana)	2	24	10
Internacional	Total		10	6	8	1	0	0	5	2	4	3	27	12
AC Milan	2007–08	Serie A	18	9	—		0	0	2 (Note: Appearances in UEFA Champions League)	0	—		20	9
AC Milan	2008–09	Serie A	36	15	—		0	0	6 (Note: Appearances in UEFA Europa League)	3	—		42	18
AC Milan	2009–10	Serie A	23	12	—		0	0	7	2	—		30	14
AC Milan	2010–11	Serie A	25	14	—		3	2	5	0	—		33	16
AC Milan	2011–12	Serie A	11	1	—		1	1	5	2	1 (Note: Appearance in Supercoppa Italiana)	0	18	4
AC Milan	2012–13	Serie A	4	0	—		0	0	3	2	—		7	2
AC Milan	Total		117	51	—		4	3	28	9	1	0	150	63
Corinthians	2013	Série A	30	9	14	5	4	1	8	2	1	0	57	17
Corinthians	2014	Série A	—		5	0	—		—		—		5	0
Corinthians	Total		30	9	19	5	4	1	8	2	1	0	62	17
São Paulo (loan)	2014	Série A	29	9	0	0	6	2	4 (Note: Appearances in Copa Sudamericana)	1	—		39	12
São Paulo (loan)	2015	Série A	33	10	14	8	6	5	6	3	—		59	26
São Paulo (loan)	Total		62	19	14	8	12	7	10	4	—		98	38
Chelsea (loan)	2015–16	Premier League	2	1	—		0	0	0	0	—		2	1
Villarreal	2016–17	La Liga	14	2	—		3	1	7 (Note: Two appearances and one goal in UEFA Champions League, five appearances and two goals in UEFA Europa League)	3	—		24	6
Tianjin Quanjian	2017	Chinese Super League	24	15	—		2	2	—		—		26	17
Tianjin Quanjian	2018	Chinese Super League	23	15	—		0	0	11 (Note: Appearances in AFC Champions League Elite)	4	—		34	19
Tianjin Quanjian	Total		47	30	—		2	2	11	4	—		60	36
São Paulo	2019	Série A	20	5	0	0	2	0	—		—		22	5
São Paulo	2020	Série A	0	0	11	3	0	0	2	1	—		13	4
São Paulo	Total		20	5	11	3	2	0	2	1	—		35	9
Orlando City	2021	MLS	4	0	—		—		—		1 (Note: Appearance in MLS Cup playoffs)	0	5	0
Orlando City	2022	MLS	22	3	—		5	1	—		—		27	4
Orlando City	Total		26	3	—		5	1	—		1	0	32	4
São Paulo	2023	Série A	9	2	0	0	0	0	1	0	—		10	2
Career total			337	128	52	17	32	15	72	25	7	3	500	188

=== International ===
Appearances and goals by national team and year
National team	Year	Apps	Goals
Brazil	2008	1	1
Brazil	2009	4	0
Brazil	2010	3	3
Brazil	2011	7	2
Brazil	2012	4	3
Brazil	2013	5	1
Total		27	10

Brazil score listed first, score column indicates score after each Pato goal.

List of international goals scored by Alexandre Pato
No.	Date	Cap	Venue	Opponent	Score	Result	Competition	Ref.
1	26 March 2008	1	Emirates Stadium, London, England	Sweden	1–0	1–0	Friendly	
2	10 August 2010	9	New Meadowlands Stadium, New Jersey, United States	United States	2–0	2–0	Friendly	
3	7 October 2010	10	Sheikh Zayed Stadium, Abu Dhabi, United Arab Emirates	Iran	2–0	3–0	Friendly	
4	11 October 2010	11	Pride Park, Derby, England	Ukraine	2–0	2–0	Friendly	
5	13 July 2011	15	Estadio Mario Alberto Kempes, Córdoba, Argentina	Ecuador	1–0	4–2	2011 Copa América	
6	13 July 2011	15	Estadio Mario Alberto Kempes, Córdoba, Argentina	Ecuador	3–2	4–2	2011 Copa América	
7	30 May 2012	19	FedExField, Maryland, United States	United States	4–1	4–1	Friendly	
8	15 August 2012	22	Råsunda Stadium, Solna, Sweden	Sweden	2–0	3–0	Friendly	
9	15 August 2012	22	Råsunda Stadium, Solna, Sweden	Sweden	3–0	3–0	Friendly	
10	7 September 2013	25	Estádio Nacional Mané Garrincha, Brasília, Brazil	Australia	5–0	6–0	Friendly	

== Honours ==
Internacional

- FIFA Club World Cup: 2006
- Recopa Sudamericana: 2007

AC Milan

- Serie A: 2010–11
- Supercoppa Italiana: 2011

Corinthians

- Campeonato Paulista: 2013
- Recopa Sudamericana: 2013

Orlando City

- U.S. Open Cup: 2022

São Paulo

- Copa do Brasil: 2023

Brazil U20

- South American Youth Football Championship: 2007

Brazil U23

- Olympic Silver Medal: 2012
- Olympic Bronze Medal: 2008

Brazil

- FIFA Confederations Cup: 2009

Individual

- Brazilian U-20 Championships top scorer: 2006
- Brazilian U-20 Championships Most Valuable Player: 2006
- Sendai Cup top scorer: 2006
- Sendai Cup Most Valuable Player: 2006
- Serie A Player of the Month: January 2009
- Serie A Young Footballer of the Year: 2009
- Golden Boy Award: 2009
- AC Milan Hall of Fame

== Publications ==
- Celso de Campos Jr., "The Mighty Duck", FourFourTwo, Haymarket Publications, pg. 68–70, November 2007 edition.
