= Alfredo Barbini =

Alfredo Barbini, a glass artist born in 1912 on the islands of Murano in the lagoon of Venice, Italy, was one of Murano's leading figures of the twentieth century. His parents were members of families which had been prominent in the glassmaking industry on Murano for generations as glassblowers and beadmakers.

== Career ==
Barbini began his long career in 1925 at the age of 13, working in the S.A.I.A.R. Ferro Toso factory. In 1929 he joined Cristalleria di Venezia e Murano as a master glassblower. He left that firm in 1932 for employment with a glass workshop in Milan, but returned to Murano to work first at the newly formed Zecchin & Martinuzzi firm and then with Seguso Vetri d'Arte. From 1936 to 1944 he was a partner and master glassblower at Societa Anonima Vetri Artistici Murano, known as S.A.V.A.M.

Following World War II Barbini worked as master glassblower and designer successively with Archimede Seguso and Napoleone Martinuzzi, then became a partner with Vetreria Vistosi and, later, Gino Cenedese. With financial assistance from the firm of Salviati & C., for whom he produced products, he formed in 1950 his own glass firm, Vetreria Alfredo Barbini (reorganized in 1983 as Alfredo Barbini Srl). His firm exhibited his work at the Venice Biennales from 1950 to 1961. He died in 2007.

== Awards ==
Among numerous other honors, Barbini was awarded the "Osella d'Oro" by Venice's Associazione degli Industriale and the honorary title "Commendatore" and was named "1989 Venetian of the Year" by the Settimare Association.
