= Andrea Schenetti =

Italian footballer (born 1991)

Personal information
- Date of birth: 9 March 1991 (age 35)
- Place of birth: Milan, Italy
- Height: 1.73 m (5 ft 8 in)
- Positions: Winger; striker

Team information
- Current team: Heraclea

Youth career
- Olmi
- 2001–2010: Milan

Senior career*
| Years | Team | Apps | (Gls) |
| 2010–2012 | Milan | 0 | (0) |
| 2010–2011 | → Lucchese (loan) | 1 | (0) |
| 2011 | → Prato (loan) | 10 | (2) |
| 2011–2012 | → Südtirol (loan) | 31 | (6) |
| 2012–2013 | Sorrento | 13 | (3) |
| 2013–2014 | Como | 42 | (6) |
| 2014–2019 | Cittadella | 141 | (19) |
| 2019–2022 | Entella | 93 | (18) |
| 2022–2024 | Foggia | 55 | (6) |
| 2024–2025 | Pro Vercelli | 23 | (1) |
| 2025– | Heraclea | 33 | (5) |
- * Club domestic league appearances and goals as of 3 May 2026

Andrea Schenetti (born 9 March 1991) is an Italian professional footballer who plays as a forward for Heraclea.

== Club career ==
=== Early career ===
Born in Milan, Schenetti started playing football with amateur football academy Olmi, before joining A.C. Milan in 2001. He spent nine seasons in the club's youth system and was a member of both the under-19 squad who won the Campionato Berretti in 2009, and the under-20 side who triumphed in the Coppa Italia Primavera in 2010, 25 years after the team's last success in the competition.

=== Lucchese and Prato ===
At the beginning of the 2010–11 season, Schenetti was loaned out to Prima Divisione club Lucchese. Nevertheless, in the last week of August he suffered a calf injury, which prevented him to play for 45 days. The 19-year-old striker eventually made his official debut for the club on 17 November 2010, in a group stage game of the Coppa Italia Lega Pro against Carpi; he played 70 minutes and also scored the opener, before the opponents fought back in the second half to earn a 2–1 win. On 5 December, Schenetti made his league debut, coming on in the 75th minute of a 0–0 draw against Juve Stabia. That game, however, marked his last appearance for the club, as his loan spell was terminated on 26 January 2011, due to lack of playing time.

Subsequently, Schenetti was sent out on another loan deal to Seconda Divisione club Prato for the remainder of the season. He made 10 league appearances and scored one goal, as the team finished third in the table and qualified for the promotion play-offs, where he made four further appearances and scored two more goals. However, they lost the final 2–1 on aggregate to Carrarese.

=== Südtirol ===
For the 2011–12 season, Schenetti joined Prima Divisione side Südtirol on another loan deal.

=== Sorrento ===
On 31 August 2012, Schenetti moved to Prima Divisione club Sorrento for an undisclosed fee, signing a two-year deal.

=== Entella ===
On 9 August 2019, he joined Entella.

=== Serie C ===
On 2 August 2022, Schenetti signed a two-year contract with Foggia. On 29 July 2024, he moved to Taranto for two seasons. Taranto contract fell through, and on 30 August 2024 Schenetti signed with Pro Vercelli instead.

== Style of play ==
Due to his fast pace, Schenetti usually plays as a winger in a 4–3–3 formation, but he has also been employed as a striker, alongside a more physical forward.
