= Giovanni Scampini =

Italian footballer

Personal information
- Full name: Giovanni Scampini
- Date of birth: 8 November 1991 (age 35)
- Place of birth: Busto Arsizio, Italy
- Height: 1.80 m (5 ft 11 in)
- Position: Central midfielder

Team information
- Current team: Massese

Youth career
- Pro Patria
- 2003–2010: Milan

Senior career*
Years	Team	Apps	(Gls)
2010–2012	Milan	0	(0)
2010–2011	→ Pisa (loan)	6	(0)
2011	→ Poggibonsi (loan)	5	(0)
2011–2012	→ Pisa (loan)	14	(0)
2012–2013	Pavia	3	(0)
2013–2014	Poggibonsi	31	(0)
2015–2016	Sestri Levante	7	(1)
2016	Legnano	10	(0)
2016–2017	Seregno	10	(1)
2017–2018	Ciserano	25	(3)
2018–2019	GS Arconatese	23	(0)
2019–2020	Milano City	15	(1)
2020–2021	Città di Varese	4	(0)
2021–	Massese	10	(0)
- * Club domestic league appearances and goals as of 21:17, 19 January 2021 (UTC)

Giovanni Scampini (born 8 November 1991) is an Italian professional footballer who plays as a midfielder for Italian club Massese.

== Club career ==
=== Early career ===
Born in Busto Arsizio, Scampini started playing football with the local team Pro Patria, before joining Milan at the start of the 2003–04 season. He spent seven years in the club's youth system and was a member of the under-20 side who triumphed in the Coppa Italia Primavera in 2010, 25 years after their last success.

=== Pisa ===
For the 2010–11 season, Scampini was sent out on loan to Prima Divisione side Pisa. He made his official debut for the club in the first game of the Coppa Italia Lega Pro group stage against Sangiovannese — which Pisa won 2–1 — on 15 August 2010. The next week, he also made his league debut, in the first match of the season against Nocerina.

=== Poggibonsi ===
Scampini was signed on another loan deal by Seconda Divisione club Poggibonsi, on 31 January 2011.

=== Massese ===
On 7 August 2021, Scampini joined Massese.
