= Gianmarco Conti =

Italian professional footballer (born 1992)

Personal information
- Date of birth: 1 February 1992 (age 34)
- Place of birth: Mirano, Italy
- Height: 1.85 m (6 ft 1 in)
- Position: Midfielder

Team information
- Current team: Lunano Calcio
- Number: 23

Youth career
- Venezia
- 2008–2010: Milan

Senior career*
Years	Team	Apps	(Gls)
2010–2012	Milan	0	(0)
2010–2011	→ Fano (loan)	8	(0)
2011–2012	→ Lecco (loan)	16	(0)
2012–2013	Bassano	13	(1)
2013–2014	Virtus Verona	22	(9)
2014–2015	Pordenone	9	(0)
2015	Monza	13	(2)
2015–2016	Pergolettese	32	(2)
2016–2017	Gżira United	30	(3)
2017–2018	Calvi Noale	16	(0)
2018–2019	Lavagnese	13	(1)
2019–2026	Gżira United	8	(1)

International career
2008	Italy U-16	5 (Note: Conti received a call-up to a friendly tournament in March 2008, however the archive of Italian Football Federation did not have the record of the matches (Ireland, Turkey, Malta), thus his cap for the under-16 team was at least: 4 as indicated by the archive, plus starting appearance against Turkey, as indicated by Turkish Football Federation.)	(0)
2008	Italy U-17	2	(0)
- * Club domestic league appearances and goals as of 9 April 2019

Gianmarco Conti (born 1 February 1992) is an Italian professional footballer who plays for Gżira United.

Conti joined A.C. Milan in co-ownership deal for €200,000. In June 2009, few weeks before the bankruptcy of Venezia, Conti was sold outright for €50,000. In 2011, he was signed by Lecco in temporary deal.

Conti was signed by Serie D club Virtus Verona in October 2013. On 2 July 2014 he returned to professional football for Pordenone.
