= Matteo Barbini (footballer) =

Italian professional footballer

Personal information
- Full name: Matteo Barbini
- Date of birth: 25 January 1991 (age 35)
- Place of birth: Venice, Italy
- Height: 1.80 m (5 ft 11 in)
- Position: Midfielder

Team information
- Current team: Sacilese

Youth career
- 1996–2001: Sesto Bagnarola
- 2001–2006: Sanvitese
- 2006–2009: Treviso
- 2009–2010: Milan

Senior career*
Years	Team	Apps	(Gls)
2010–	Milan	0	(0)
2010–	→ Sacilese (loan)	9	(0)
- * Club domestic league appearances and goals as of 3 April 2011

Matteo Barbini (born 25 January 1991) is an Italian professional footballer who plays as a midfielder for Seconda Divisione club Sacilese, on loan from Milan.

== Club career ==
=== Early career ===
Born in Venice, Barbini started playing football with local team Sesto Bagnarola at the age of 5, before joining Sanvitese at the age of 10 and then moving to Treviso at the age of 15. In August 2009, aged 18, he was signed by Serie A club Milan and spent one season in the club's youth system.

=== Sacilese ===
At the beginning of the 2010–11 season, Barbini was sent out on loan to Seconda Divisione club Sacilese. He made his official debut for the club on 22 August 2010, in a Coppa Italia Lega Pro group stage game against Sambonifacese, playing the whole 90 minutes, as Sacilese suffered a 3–0 defeat. A month later, on 26 September, he also made his league debut, coming on in the 80th minute of a 1–0 away loss against Casale.
