= Luca Meregalli =

Italian footballer (born 1991)

Personal information
- Full name: Luca Meregalli
- Date of birth: 14 July 1991 (age 35)
- Place of birth: Monza, Italy
- Height: 1.85 m (6 ft 1 in)
- Position: Centre-back

Team information
- Current team: Cisanese

Youth career
- Monza
- Milan

Senior career*
Years	Team	Apps	(Gls)
2010–2011	Milan	0	(0)
2010–2011	→ Pro Vercelli (loan)	0	(0)
2011	→ Pavia (loan)	2	(0)
2011–2013	Pavia	46	(0)
2013–2014	Piacenza	0	(0)
2014–2015	Virtus Castelfranco	31	(1)
2015	Ponte San Pietro	14	(0)
2015–2020	Virtus Bergamo	148	(3)
2020–2021	Villa Valle	33	(0)
2021	Castellanzese	6	(0)
2021–2022	Tritium	11	(0)
2022	Soresinese		
2022–	Cisanese		
- * Club domestic league appearances and goals as of 21:54, 9 January 2023 (UTC)

Luca Meregalli (born 14 July 1991) is an Italian professional footballer who plays as a centre-back for Eccellenza club Cisanese.

== Club career ==
=== Early career ===
Meregalli joined Milan as a youngster. Throughout his time in the club's youth system, he has been a member of the under-20 side who won the Coppa Italia Primavera in 2010, 25 years after their last success — though he missed both legs of the final due to injury.

=== Pro Vercelli ===
For the 2010–11 season, Meregalli was loaned out to Seconda Divisione club Pro Belvedere. Soon later, the club merged with bankruptcy-threatened crosstown rivals U.S. Pro Vercelli to form F.C. Pro Vercelli 1892.

Meregalli made his official debut for the club in the first game of the Coppa Italia Lega Pro group stage against Valenzana, on 15 August 2010. He came off the bench during the second half, as Pro Vercelli won the match 2–0.

=== Pavia ===
On 31 January 2011, Meregalli was sent on another loan deal to Prima Divisione side Pavia for the remainder of the season.
