= 2008–09 AC Milan season =

Milan
2008–09 season
- President: Vacant
- Head coach: Carlo Ancelotti
- Stadium: San Siro
- Serie A: 3rd
- Coppa Italia: Round of 16
- UEFA Cup: Round of 32
- Top goalscorer: League: Kaká (16); All: Alexandre Pato (18)
- Average home league attendance: 59,731
Home colours	Away colours	Third colours

During the 2008–09 season, Milan played its 75th Serie A season in the club's existence. Milan would also compete in the 2008-09 Coppa Italia and UEFA Cup after a 5th-place finish the Previous Season.

Milan would finish third in Serie A, 10 points behind champions and rivals Inter Milan. Milan also failed to win the Coppa Italia or UEFA Cup meaning they finished without a trophy for the first time since 2006. This season marked Carlo Ancelotti's final season in charge of Milan as he resigned after Milan's final game of the season as well as legendary defender Paolo Maldini’s 24th and final time appearing with the club, spending his whole entire career since 1985.

== Club ==
=== Management ===
Position	Staff
Head coach	(Italy) Carlo Ancelotti
Assistant coach	(Italy) Mauro Tassotti (Italy) Filippo Galli
Goalkeeping coaches	(Italy) Villiam Vecchi (Italy) Beniamino Abate
Fitness coaches	(Italy) Daniele Tognaccini (Italy) Giovanni Mauri
Club doctor	(Italy) Massimo Manara
President	(Italy) Adriano Galliani

Last updated: July 19, 2008

Source: San Siro

== Squad ==
=== First team ===

Starting line-up.

As of December 21, 2008. Note: Flags indicate national team as defined under FIFA eligibility rules; some limited exceptions apply. Players may hold more than one non-FIFA nationality.

No.	Pos.	Nation	Player
1	GK	BRA	Dida
2	DF	BRA	Felipe Mattioni (on loan from Grêmio)
3	DF	ITA	Paolo Maldini (captain)
4	DF	GEO	Kakha Kaladze
7	FW	BRA	Alexandre Pato
8	MF	ITA	Gennaro Gattuso
9	FW	ITA	Filippo Inzaghi
10	MF	NED	Clarence Seedorf
11	FW	ITA	Marco Borriello
12	GK	ITA	Christian Abbiati
13	DF	ITA	Alessandro Nesta
14	MF	URU	Mathias Cardacio
15	DF	ITA	Gianluca Zambrotta
16	GK	AUS	Zeljko Kalac

No.	Pos.	Nation	Player
18	DF	CZE	Marek Jankulovski
19	DF	ITA	Giuseppe Favalli
20	MF	URU	Tabaré Viúdez
21	MF	ITA	Andrea Pirlo
22	MF	BRA	Kaká
23	MF	ITA	Massimo Ambrosini (vice-captain)
24	DF	SUI	Philippe Senderos (on loan from Arsenal)
25	DF	ITA	Daniele Bonera
32	MF	ENG	David Beckham (on loan from Los Angeles Galaxy)
36	DF	ITA	Matteo Darmian
51	MF	SLE	Rodney Strasser (from Primavera team)
76	FW	UKR	Andriy Shevchenko (on loan from Chelsea)
77	DF	ITA	Luca Antonini
80	MF	BRA	Ronaldinho
84	MF	FRA	Mathieu Flamini

=== Transfers ===
In
Pos.	Name	from	Type
FW	Ronaldinho	FC Barcelona	(€21 million )
FW	Andrei Shevchenko	Chelsea F.C.	loan
DF	Gianluca Zambrotta	FC Barcelona	(€9 million )
MF	Mathías Cardacio	Nacional Montevideo	(€2,5 million)
MF	Mathieu Flamini		free
FW	Marco Borriello	Genoa C.F.C.	co-ownership (€7,5 million )
FW	Tabaré Viudez	Defensor Sporting	(€1,5 million )
DF	Philippe Senderos	Arsenal F.C.	´loan
DF	Luca Antonini	Empoli F.C.	co-ownership
MF	Ignazio Abate	Empoli F.C.	co-ownership(€2,0 million)
GK	Christian Abbiati	Atletico Madrid	loan ended
GK	Ferdinando Coppola	Atalanta B.C.	loan ended
GK	Marco Storari	Cagliari Calcio	loan ended
DF	Luca Antonelli	Parma F.C.	loan ended
DF	Davide Astori	Cremonese	loan ended
DF	Marcus Diniz	A.C. Monza	loan ended
DF	Leandro Grimi	Sporting Lisboa	loan ended
DF	Romano Perticone	Cremonese	loan ended
FW	Matteo Ardemagni	Pro Patria	loan ended
FW	Davide Di Gennaro	Bologna F.C.	loan ended

Out
Pos.	Name	To	Type
FW	Alberto Gilardino	Fiorentina	(€14 million )
FW	Ricardo Oliveira	Real Zaragoza	(€10,0 million)
DF	Cafu		retired
GK	Valerio Fiori		retired
MF	Serginho		retired
DF	Leandro Grimi	Sporting Lisboa	(€2,5 million )
MF	Cristian Brocchi	S.S. Lazio	
GK	Ferdinando Coppola	Atalanta B.C.	co-ownership (€0,9 million )
GK	Marco Storari	Fiorentina	loan
DF	Luca Antonelli	Parma F.C.	co-ownership
DF	Davide Astori	Cagliari Calcio	co-ownership
DF	Matteo Bruscagin	A.C. Monza	loan
DF	Digão	Standard Liege	loan
DF	Marcus Diniz	Livorno	co-ownership
DF	Lino Marzorati	Empoli F.C.	co-ownership
DF	Romano Perticone	Livorno	co-ownership
DF	Massimo Oddo	Bayern München	loan
DF	Dario Šimić	A.S. Monaco	end of contract
MF	Ignazio Abate	Torino F.C.	co-ownership
MF	Ibrahim Ba		retired
MF	Yoann Gourcuff	Girondins Bordeaux	loan
MF	Paolo Sammarco	Sampdoria	co-ownership
FW	Matteo Ardemagni	Triestina	co-ownership
FW	Pierre-Emerick Aubameyang	Digione	loan
FW	Willy Aubameyang	Avellino	loan
FW	Davide Di Gennaro	Genoa C.F.C.	co-ownership
FW	Alessandro Matri	Cagliari Calcio	co-ownership
FW	Alberto Paloschi	Parma F.C.	co-ownership

==== Winter ====
In
Pos.	Name	from	Type
DF	Thiago Silva	Fluminense	(€10 million )
MF	David Beckham	Los Angeles Galaxy	loan
DF	Matteo Bruscagin	A.C. Monza	loan ended
DF	Felipe Mattioni	Gremio	loan

Out
Pos.	Name	To	Type
FW	Ronaldo	SC Corinthians	released
MF	Emerson	Santos	released
DF	Matteo Bruscagin	Pizzighettone	loan
DF	Thiago Silva	Fluminense	loan

== Pre-season and friendlies ==
Win Draw Loss

23 July 2008 Friendly	Cremonese	0–0	Milan	Cremona, Italy
17:30 CEST (UTC+02:00)				Stadium: Stadio Giovanni Zini; Referee: Luca Marelli (Italy)

29 July 2008 TIM Trophy	Juventus	2–2 (2–4 p)	Milan	Turin, Italy
20:30 CEST (UTC+02:00)	Trezeguet 9'; Marchionni 12'	Report	Seedorf 8', 43'	Stadium: Stadio Olimpico; Attendance: 20,000; Referee: Christian Brighi (Italy)
	Penalties
	Trezeguet (penalty missed); Iaquinta (penalty scored); Chiellini (penalty scored); Tiago (penalty missed)		(penalty scored) Kaká; (penalty scored) Pirlo; (penalty scored) Jankulovski; (penalty scored) Paloschi
Note: 45-minute match

29 July 2008 TIM Trophy	Milan	0–0 (4–3 p)	Internazionale	Turin, Italy
22:30 CEST (UTC+02:00)		Report		Stadium: Stadio Olimpico; Attendance: 20,000; Referee: Christian Brighi (Italy)
	Penalties
	Kaká (penalty scored); Oddo (penalty missed); Jankulovski (penalty scored); Favalli (penalty missed); Brocchi (penalty scored); Digão (penalty scored)		(penalty scored) Adriano; (penalty missed) Figo; (penalty scored) Suazo; (penalty missed) Jiménez; (penalty scored) Santon; (penalty missed) Muntari
Note: 45-minute match

1 August 2008 Russian Railways Cup	Milan	0–1	Sevilla	Moscow, Russia
	Gattuso 48' (o.g.)			Stadium: Lokomotiv Stadium; Attendance: 15,000; Referee: Stanislav Sukhina (Russia)

3 August 2008 Russian Railways Cup	Milan	0–5	Chelsea	Moscow, Russia
			Lampard 3'; Anelka 8', 18', 51', 58'	Stadium: Lokomotiv Stadium; Attendance: 20,000; Referee: Yuri Baskakov (Russia)

9 August 2008 Friendly	Manchester City	1–0	Milan	Manchester, England
17:15 BST (UTC+01:00)	Bojinov 37'			Stadium: City of Manchester Stadium; Attendance: 25,181; Referee: Mark Halsey (England)

17 August 2008 Trofeo Luigi Berlusconi	Milan	4–1	Juventus	Milan, Italy
19:45 CEST (UTC+02:00)	Jankulovski 21'; Ambrosini 24'; Inzaghi 51'; Ambrosini 78'		Pasquato 69'	Stadium: San Siro; Attendance: 41,250; Referee: Nicola Rizzoli (Italy)

21 August 2008 Trofeo Birra Moretti	Napoli	0–1	Milan	Naples, Italy
21:30 CEST (UTC+02:00)		Report	Paloschi 44'	Stadium: Stadio San Paolo; Attendance: 50,000; Referee: Nicola Pierpaoli (Italy)
Note: 45-minute match

21 August 2008 Trofeo Birra Moretti	Juventus	0–0 (5–4 p)	Milan	Naples, Italy
22:30 CEST (UTC+02:00)		Report		Stadium: Stadio San Paolo; Attendance: 50,000; Referee: Andrea Gervasoni (Italy)
	Penalties
	Ariaudo (penalty scored); Chimenti (penalty scored); Legrottaglie (penalty scored); Pasquato (penalty scored); Amauri (penalty missed); Molinaro (penalty scored)		(penalty scored) Seedorf; (penalty scored) Brocchi; (penalty scored) Paloschi; (penalty scored) Osuji; (penalty missed) Ambrosini; (penalty missed) Favalli
Note: 45-minute match

24 August 2008 Trofeo Villa de Gijón	Sporting de Gijón	2–0	Milan	Gijón, Spain
20:00 CEST (UTC+02:00)	Barral 24'; Bilić 75'			Stadium: El Molinón; Referee: César Muñiz Fernández (Spain)

10 September 2008 Friendly	Lugano	2–0	Milan	Lugano, Switzerland
19:00 CEST (UTC+02:00)	Rennella 53'; Laborde 90+1'			Stadium: Stadio Cornaredo; Referee: Carlo Bertolini (Switzerland)

14 October 2008 Taçi Oil Cup	Tirana	2–1	Milan	Tirana, Albania
20:00 CEST (UTC+02:00)	Xhafaj 29'; Muzaka 72'		Ronaldinho 90+1'	Stadium: Qemal Stafa Stadium; Attendance: 20,000; Referee: Albano Janku (Albania)

6 January 2009 Dubai Challenge Cup	Milan	1–1 (4–3 p)	Hamburger SV	Dubai, United Arab Emirates
19:00 UAET (UTC+04:00)	Ronaldinho 62' (pen.)		Benjamin 66'
	Penalties
	Ronaldinho (penalty scored); Shevchenko (penalty scored); Inzaghi (penalty scored); Emerson (penalty missed); Flamini (penalty scored)		(penalty scored) Petrić; (penalty missed) Thiago Neves; (penalty scored) Olić; (penalty missed) Aogo; (penalty scored) Demel

21 January 2009 Friendly	Hannover 96	2–3	Milan	Hanover, Germany
19:30 CET (UTC+01:00)	Huszti 10'; Hanke 74'		Shevchenko 52'; Inzaghi 55', 75'	Stadium: AWD Arena; Referee: Babak Rafati (Germany)

4 February 2009 Friendly	Rangers	2–2	Milan	Glasgow, Scotland
20:45 GMT (UTC+00:00)	Beasley 65'; Papac 83'		Pato 70'; Kaká 78'	Stadium: Ibrox Stadium; Referee: Willie Collum (Scotland)

4 March 2009 Friendly	Al-Sadd	1–2	Milan	Doha, Qatar
	Gholam 37'		Pato 27'; Antonini 37'	Stadium: Jassim bin Hamad Stadium; Referee: Banjar Al-Dosari (Qatar)

22 April 2009 Friendly	Hungary's league selection	2–5	Milan	Budapest, Hungary
	Rajczi 7'; Tököli 56'		Kaká 37'; Shevchenko 47', 63'; Seedorf 73'; Viúdez 85'	Stadium: Ferenc Puskás Stadium; Referee: Konrad Plautz (Austria)

12 May 2009 Taçi Oil Cup	Albania	3–3 (4–5 p)	Milan	Tirana, Albania
19:00 CEST (UTC+02:00)	Vila 64'; Muzaka 71'; Salihi 76'		Ronaldinho 22'; Shevchenko 48'; Inzaghi 87'	Stadium: Qemal Stafa Stadium; Attendance: 20,000; Referee: Lorenc Jemini (Albania)
	Penalties
	Pisha (penalty scored); Muzaka (penalty scored); Vila (penalty scored); Vrapi (penalty scored); Beqiri (penalty missed)		(penalty scored) Kaká; (penalty scored) Seedorf; (penalty scored) Flamini; (penalty scored) Thiago Silva; (penalty scored) Inzaghi

== Competitions ==
Win Draw Loss

=== Overall ===
Competition	Started round	Final position	Final Round	First match	Last match
Serie A	Round 1	—	Round 38	August 31, 2008	May 31, 2009
Coppa Italia	Round of 16	Eliminated	Round of 16	December 3, 2008	December 3, 2008
UEFA Cup	First Round	Eliminated	Round of 32	September 18, 2008	February 26, 2009

=== Serie A ===
==== League table ====
Pos	Team	Pld	W	D	L	GF	GA	GD	Pts	Qualification or relegation
1	Internazionale (C)	38	25	9	4	70	32	+38	84	Qualification to Champions League group stage
2	Juventus	38	21	11	6	69	37	+32	74 (Note: Juventus finished ahead of Milan on head-to-head points: Juventus 4–2 Milan, Milan 1–1 Juventus.)	Qualification to Champions League group stage
3	Milan	38	22	8	8	70	35	+35	74	Qualification to Champions League group stage
4	Fiorentina	38	21	5	12	53	38	+15	68 (Note: Fiorentina finished ahead of Genoa on head-to-head points: Fiorentina 1–0 Genoa, Genoa 3–3 Fiorentina.)	Qualification to Champions League play-off round
5	Genoa	38	19	11	8	56	39	+17	68	Qualification to Europa League play-off round (Note: Lazio qualified for the play-off round of the 2009–10 UEFA Europa League by winning the 2008–09 Coppa Italia.)

Source: lega-calcio.it (in Italian)
Rules for classification: 1) points; 2) head-to-head points; 3) head-to-head goal difference; 4) head-to-head goals scored; 5) goal difference; 6) number of goals scored.
(C) Champions

==== Results summary ====
Overall								Home						Away					
Pld	W	D	L	GF	GA	GD	Pts	W	D	L	GF	GA	GD	W	D	L	GF	GA	GD
36	21	8	7	67	31	+36	71	14	3	1	37	9	+28	7	5	6	30	22	+8

==== Results by round ====
Round	1	2	3	4	5	6	7	8	9	10	11	12	13	14	15	16	17	18	19	20	21	22	23	24	25	26	27	28	29	30	31	32	33	34	35	36	37	38
Ground	H	A	H	A	H	A	H	A	H	H	A	H	A	A	H	A	H	A	H	A	H	A	H	A	H	A	H	A	A	H	A	H	H	A	H	A	H	A
Result	L	L	W	W	W	D	W	W	W	W	D	W	D	L	W	L	W	D	W	W	D	W	D	L	W	L	W	W	D	W	W	W	W	W	D	L	L	W
Position	14	19	15	9	6	8	6	4	3	1	2	2	2	3	3	4	3	3	3	3	3	2	2	3	3	3	3	3	3	3	3	2	2	2	2	2	3	3

Source: calcio-seriea.net
A = Away; H = Home; W = Win; D = Draw; L = Loss; P = Postponed; = Leader, 2009–10 UEFA Champions League Groups stage; = 2009–10 UEFA Champions League Groups stage; = 2009–10 UEFA Champions League Qualifying round; = 2009–10 UEFA Cup; = 2009–10 Serie B

==== Matches ====
31 August 2008 1	Milan	1–2	Bologna	Milan
15:00 CEST (UTC+02:00)	Ambrosini 41'	Report	Di Vaio 18'; Valiani 78'	Stadium: San Siro; Attendance: 63,306; Referee: Daniele Orsato

14 September 2008 2	Genoa	2–0	Milan	Genoa
15:00 CEST (UTC+02:00)	Sculli 30'; Milito 90' (pen.)	Report		Stadium: Stadio Luigi Ferraris; Attendance: 28,795; Referee: Gianluca Rocchi

21 September 2008 3	Milan	4–1	Lazio	Milan
20:30 CEST (UTC+02:00)	Seedorf 8'; Zambrotta 35'; Pato 49'; Kaká 60'	Report	Zárate 26'	Stadium: San Siro; Attendance: 57,362; Referee: Nicola Rizzoli

24 September 2008 4	Reggina	1–2	Milan	Reggio Calabria
20:30 CEST (UTC+02:00)	Corradi 59'	Report	Borriello 24'; Pato 73'	Stadium: Stadio Oreste Granillo; Attendance: 19,828; Referee: Massimiliano Saccani

28 September 2008 5	Milan	1–0	Internazionale	Milan
20:30 CEST (UTC+02:00)	Ronaldinho 37'	Report		Stadium: San Siro; Attendance: 79,057; Referee: Emidio Morganti

5 October 2008 6	Cagliari	0–0	Milan	Cagliari
20:30 CEST (UTC+02:00)		Report		Stadium: Stadio Sant'Elia; Attendance: 15,750; Referee: Roberto Rosetti

19 October 2008 7	Milan	3–0	Sampdoria	Milan
15:00 CEST (UTC+02:00)	Ronaldinho 55' (pen.), 60'; Inzaghi 90'	Report		Stadium: San Siro; Attendance: 65,960; Referee: Antonio Damato

26 October 2008 8	Atalanta	0–1	Milan	Bergamo
15:00 CET (UTC+01:00)		Report	Kaká 80'	Stadium: Stadio Atleti Azzurri d'Italia; Attendance: 20,899; Referee: Stefano Farina

29 October 2008 9	Milan	2–1	Siena	Milan
20:30 CET (UTC+01:00)	Inzaghi 31'; Kaká 65' (pen.)	Report	Vergassola 54'	Stadium: San Siro; Attendance: 49,650; Referee: Domenico Celi

2 November 2008 10	Milan	1–0	Napoli	Milan
20:30 CET (UTC+01:00)	Ronaldinho 86'	Report		Stadium: San Siro; Attendance: 54,079; Referee: Gianluca Rocchi

9 November 2008 11	Lecce	1–1	Milan	Lecce
20:30 CET (UTC+01:00)	Esposito 90+3'	Report	Ronaldinho 79'	Stadium: Stadio Via del Mare; Attendance: 29,658; Referee: Mauro Bergonzi

16 November 2008 12	Milan	1–0	Chievo	Milan
15:00 CET (UTC+01:00)	Kaká 15' (pen.)	Report		Stadium: San Siro; Attendance: 58,403; Referee: Andrea De Marco

23 November 2008 13	Torino	2–2	Milan	Turin
20:30 CET (UTC+01:00)	Stellone 25'; Rosina 78' (pen.)	Report	Pato 29'; Ronaldinho 34'	Stadium: Stadio Olimpico; Attendance: 22,627; Referee: Stefano Farina

30 November 2008 14	Palermo	3–1	Milan	Palermo
20:30 CET (UTC+01:00)	Miccoli 50'; Cavani 60'; Simplício 80'	Report	Ronaldinho 83' (pen.)	Stadium: Stadio Renzo Barbera; Attendance: 33,998; Referee: Gianluca Rocchi

7 December 2008 15	Milan	1–0	Catania	Milan
15:00 CET (UTC+01:00)	Kaká 65'	Report		Stadium: San Siro; Attendance: 54,314; Referee: Andrea Gervasoni

14 December 2008 16	Juventus	4–2	Milan	Turin
20:30 CET (UTC+01:00)	Del Piero 16' (pen.); Chiellini 34'; Amauri 41', 69'	Report	Pato 31'; Ambrosini 56'	Stadium: Stadio Olimpico; Attendance: 24,862; Referee: Nicola Rizzoli

21 December 2008 17	Milan	5–1	Udinese	Milan
20:30 CET (UTC+01:00)	Pato 4', 18'; Kaká 13', 52'; Seedorf 43'	Report	Di Natale 17'	Stadium: San Siro; Attendance: 52,842; Referee: Massimiliano Saccani

11 January 2009 18	Roma	2–2	Milan	Rome
20:30 CET (UTC+01:00)	Vučinić 22', 72'	Report	Pato 48', 53'	Stadium: Stadio Olimpico; Attendance: 53,444; Referee: Emidio Morganti

17 January 2009 19	Milan	1–0	Fiorentina	Milan
20:30 CET (UTC+01:00)	Pato 7'	Report		Stadium: San Siro; Attendance: 65,692; Referee: Roberto Rosetti

25 January 2009 20	Bologna	1–4	Milan	Bologna
15:00 CET (UTC+01:00)	Di Vaio 9' (pen.)	Report	Seedorf 13'; Kaká 17' (pen.), 43'; Beckham 59'	Stadium: Stadio Renato Dall'Ara; Attendance: 33,691; Referee: Paolo Tagliavento

28 January 2009 21	Milan	1–1	Genoa	Milan
20:30 CET (UTC+01:00)	Beckham 33'	Report	Milito 87'	Stadium: San Siro; Attendance: 49,907; Referee: Andrea Gervasoni

1 February 2009 22	Lazio	0–3	Milan	Rome
20:45 CET (UTC+01:00)		Report	Pato 42'; Ambrosini 47'; Kaká 83'	Stadium: Stadio Olimpico; Attendance: 40,530; Referee: Nicola Rizzoli

7 February 2009 23	Milan	1–1	Reggina	Milan
20:30 CET (UTC+01:00)	Kaká 67' (pen.)	Report	Di Gennaro 33'	Stadium: San Siro; Attendance: 53,182; Referee: Nicola Pierpaoli

15 February 2009 24	Internazionale	2–1	Milan	Milan
20:30 CET (UTC+01:00)	Adriano 29'; Stanković 43'	Report	Pato 71'	Stadium: Giuseppe Meazza; Attendance: 76,178; Referee: Roberto Rosetti

22 February 2009 25	Milan	1–0	Cagliari	Milan
15:00 CET (UTC+01:00)	Seedorf 65'	Report		Stadium: San Siro; Attendance: 56,188; Referee: Massimiliano Saccani

1 March 2009 26	Sampdoria	2–1	Milan	Genoa
15:00 CET (UTC+01:00)	Cassano 33'; Pazzini 51'	Report	Pato 80'	Stadium: Stadio Luigi Ferraris; Attendance: 25,402; Referee: Gianluca Rocchi

8 March 2009 27	Milan	3–0	Atalanta	Milan
15:00 CET (UTC+01:00)	Inzaghi 7', 71', 74'	Report		Stadium: San Siro; Attendance: 54,645; Referee: Daniele Orsato

15 March 2009 28	Siena	1–5	Milan	Siena
15:00 CET (UTC+01:00)	Maccarone 62'	Report	Pirlo 6' (pen.); Inzaghi 45+3', 71'; Pato 55', 78'	Stadium: Montepaschi Arena; Attendance: 15,373; Referee: Nicola Ayroldi

22 March 2009 29	Napoli	0–0	Milan	Naples
20:30 CET (UTC+01:00)		Report		Stadium: Stadio San Paolo; Attendance: 57,996; Referee: Andrea De Marco

5 April 2009 30	Milan	2–0	Lecce	Milan
20:30 CEST (UTC+02:00)	Ronaldinho 90+1'; Inzaghi 90+3'	Report		Stadium: San Siro; Attendance: 53,021; Referee: Stefano Farina

11 April 2009 31	Chievo	0–1	Milan	Verona
15:00 CEST (UTC+02:00)		Report	Seedorf 53'	Stadium: Stadio Marcantonio Bentegodi; Attendance: 25,169; Referee: Massimiliano Saccani

19 April 2009 32	Milan	5–1	Torino	Milan
20:30 CEST (UTC+02:00)	Inzaghi 13', 37', 60'; Kaká 68' (pen.); Ambrosini 90'	Report	Franceschini 80'	Stadium: San Siro; Attendance: 54,061; Referee: Luca Banti

26 April 2009 33	Milan	3–0	Palermo	Milan
15:00 CEST (UTC+02:00)	Kaká 10' (pen.), 56' (pen.); Inzaghi 19'	Report		Stadium: San Siro; Attendance: 61,569; Referee: Nicola Rizzoli

3 May 2009 34	Catania	0–2	Milan	Catania
15:00 CEST (UTC+02:00)		Report	Inzaghi 27'; Kaká 52'	Stadium: Stadio Angelo Massimino; Attendance: 20,285; Referee: Andrea De Marco

10 May 2009 35	Milan	1–1	Juventus	Milan
20:30 CEST (UTC+02:00)	Seedorf 57'	Report	Iaquinta 60'	Stadium: San Siro; Attendance: 78,979; Referee: Daniele Orsato

16 May 2009 36	Udinese	2–1	Milan	Udine
20:30 CEST (UTC+02:00)	D'Agostino 31' (pen.); Zapata 49'	Report	Ambrosini 90+3'	Stadium: Stadio Friuli; Attendance: 27,497; Referee: Nicola Rizzoli

24 May 2009 37	Milan	2–3	Roma	Milan
15:00 CEST (UTC+02:00)	Ambrosini 75', 82'	Report	Riise 36'; Ménez 80'; Totti 85'	Stadium: San Siro; Attendance: 72,681; Referee: Andrea De Marco

31 May 2009 38	Fiorentina	0–2	Milan	Florence
15:00 CEST (UTC+02:00)		Report	Kaká 55'; Pato 76'	Stadium: Stadio Artemio Franchi; Attendance: 41,839; Referee: Nicola Rizzoli

=== Coppa Italia ===
3 December 2008 Round of 16	Milan	1–2 (a.e.t.)	Lazio	Milan
20:45 CET (UTC+01:00)	Shevchenko 77'		Zárate 79' (pen.); Pandev 93'	Stadium: San Siro; Attendance: 3,905; Referee: Nicola Ayroldi

=== UEFA Cup ===
==== First round ====
18 September 2008 First leg	Milan (Italy)	3–1	(Switzerland) Zürich	Milan, Italy
20:45 CEST (UTC+02:00)	Stahel 45+1' (o.g.); Pato 57'; Borriello 74'	Report	Djuric 78'	Stadium: San Siro; Attendance: 25,000; Referee: Eduardo Iturralde González (Spain)

2 October 2008 Second leg	Zürich (Switzerland)	0–1 (1–4 agg.)	(Italy) Milan	Zürich, Switzerland
20:15 CEST (UTC+02:00)		Report	Shevchenko 70'	Stadium: Letzigrund; Attendance: 24,600; Referee: Damir Skomina (Slovenia)

==== Group stage ====
Pos	Team	Pld	W	D	L	GF	GA	GD	Pts	Qualification
1	(Germany) VfL Wolfsburg	4	3	1	0	13	7	+6	10	Advance to knockout stage
2	(Italy) Milan	4	2	2	0	8	5	+3	8	Advance to knockout stage
3	(Portugal) Braga	4	2	0	2	7	5	+2	6	Advance to knockout stage
4	(England) Portsmouth	4	1	1	2	7	8	−1	4	
5	(Netherlands) Heerenveen	4	0	0	4	3	13	−10	0	

Source: RSSSF

23 October 2008 1	Heerenveen (Netherlands)	1–3	(Italy) Milan	Heerenveen, Netherlands
20:45 CEST (UTC+02:00)	Pranjić 86' (pen.)	Report	Jong-a-Pin 19' (o.g.); Gattuso 23'; Inzaghi 69'	Stadium: Abe Lenstra Stadion; Attendance: 25,600; Referee: Julian Rodriguez Santiago (Spain)

6 November 2008 2	Milan (Italy)	1–0	(Portugal) Braga	Milan, Italy
20:45 CET (UTC+01:00)	Ronaldinho 90+3'	Report		Stadium: San Siro; Attendance: 10,608; Referee: Peter Rasmussen (Denmark)

27 November 2008 3	Portsmouth (England)	2–2	(Italy) Milan	Portsmouth, England
21:05 CET (UTC+01:00)	Kaboul 62'; Kanu 73'	Report	Ronaldinho 84'; Inzaghi 90+2'	Stadium: Fratton Park; Attendance: 20,403; Referee: Serge Gumienny (Belgium)

17 December 2008 4	Milan (Italy)	2–2	(Germany) VfL Wolfsburg	Milan, Italy
20:45 CET (UTC+01:00)	Ambrosini 14'; Pato 56'	Report	Zaccardo 56'; Sağlık 81'	Stadium: San Siro; Attendance: 5,420; Referee: Mark Courtney (Northern Ireland)

==== Knockout phase ====
===== Round of 32 =====
18 February 2009 First leg	Werder Bremen (Germany)	1–1	(Italy) Milan	Bremen, Germany
20:35 CET (UTC+01:00)	Diego 84'	Report	Inzaghi 36'	Stadium: Weserstadion; Attendance: 36,151; Referee: Mike Dean (England)

26 February 2009 Second leg	Milan (Italy)	2–2 (3–3a agg.)	(Germany) Werder Bremen	Milan, Italy
20:45 CET (UTC+01:00)	Pirlo 27' (pen.); Pato 33'	Report	Pizarro 68', 78'	Stadium: San Siro; Attendance: 23,280; Referee: Jonas Eriksson (Sweden)

== Statistics ==
Competitive matches only. Numbers in brackets indicate appearances made. Updated to games played May 31, 2009.

=== Players statistics ===
As of end of the season

No.	Pos	Nat	Player	Total		Serie A		Coppa Italia		UEFA Cup	
No.	Pos	Nat	Player	Apps	Goals	Apps	Goals	Apps	Goals	Apps	Goals
12	GK	(Italy) ITA	Abbiati	28	-22	28	-22	0	0	0	0
15	DF	(Italy) ITA	Zambrotta	41	1	33+1	1	1	0	6	0
3	DF	(Italy) ITA	Maldini	32	0	30	0	0	0	1+1	0
18	DF	(Czech Republic) CZE	Jankulovski	38	1	31	0	1	0	3+3	1
19	DF	(Italy) ITA	Favalli	29	0	21+2	0	1	0	5	0
21	MF	(Italy) ITA	Pirlo	29	2	26	1	0	0	3	1
23	MF	(Italy) ITA	Ambrosini	33	8	24+4	7	0	0	5	1
84	MF	(France) FRA	Flamini	37	0	22+7	0	1	0	6+1	0
10	AM	(Netherlands) NED	Seedorf	41	3	30+3	3	1	0	5+2	0
22	AM	(Brazil) BRA	Kaká	36	16	28+3	16	1	0	3+1	0
7	FW	(Brazil) BRA	Pato	42	18	27+9	15	0	0	3+3	3
1	GK	(Brazil) BRA	Dida	16	-6	9+1	0	1	-2	5	-4
32	MF	(England) ENG	Beckham	20	2	18	2	0	0	1+1	0
80	FW	(Brazil) BRA	Ronaldinho	35	10	16+13	8	1	0	2+3	2
25	DF	(Italy) ITA	Bonera	22	0	16+2	0	0	0	4	0
9	FW	(Italy) ITA	Inzaghi	32	16	15+11	13	0	0	6	3
8	MF	(Italy) ITA	Gattuso	16	1	11+1	0	0	0	3+1	1
4	DF	(Georgia (country)) GEO	Kaladze	16	0	10+1	0	1	0	3+1	0
24	DF	(Switzerland) SUI	Senderos	20	0	7+7	0	1	0	5	0
11	FW	(Italy) ITA	Borriello	8	2	6+1	1	0	0	1	1
77	DF	(Italy) ITA	Antonini	18	0	4+7	0	1	0	6	0
5	MF	(Brazil) BRA	Emerson	18	0	3+9	0	1	0	4+1	0
76	FW	(Ukraine) UKR	Shevchenko	26	2	2+16	0	1	1	6+1	1
16	GK	(Australia) AUS	Kalac	1	0	1	0	0	0	0	0
13	DF	(Italy) ITA	Nesta	1	0	0+1	0	0	0	0	0
14	MF	(Uruguay) URU	Cardaccio	2	0	0+1	0	1	0	0	0
20	MF	(Uruguay) URU	Viudez	1	0	0+1	0	0	0	0	0
36	DF	(Italy) ITA	Darmian	3	0	0+3	0	0	0	0	0
51	MF	(Sierra Leone) SLE	Strasser	1	0	0+1	0	0	0	0	0
	DF	(Brazil) BRA	Mattioni	1	0	0+1	0				

- Source: http://calcio-seriea.net/presenze/2008/1340/

=== Goalscorers ===
Rank	Name	Serie A	Coppa Italia	UEFA Cup	Total
1	(Brazil) Alexandre Pato	15	-	3	18
2	(Brazil) Kaká	16	-	-	16
2	(Italy) Filippo Inzaghi	13	-	3	16
4	(Brazil) Ronaldinho	8	-	2	10
5	(Italy) Massimo Ambrosini	7	-	1	8
6	(Netherlands) Clarence Seedorf	6	-	-	6
7	(England) David Beckham	2	-	-	2
7	(Italy) Marco Borriello	1	-	1	2
7	(Italy) Andrea Pirlo	1	-	1	2
7	(Ukraine) Andriy Shevchenko	-	1	1	2
10	(Italy) Gennaro Gattuso	-	-	1	1
10	(Czech Republic) Marek Jankulovski	-	-	1	1
10	(Italy) Gianluca Zambrotta	1	-	-	1

=== Goals conceded ===
Rank	Name	Serie A	Coppa Italia	UEFA Cup	Total	Average per game
1	(Italy) Christian Abbiati	28 (28)	-	-	28 (28)	1
2	(Brazil) Dida	7 (10)	2 (1)	9 (8)	18 (19)	0.94
3	(Australia) Zeljko Kalac	1 (1)	-	-	1 (1)	1

=== Games started ===
Name	Serie A	Coppa Italia	UEFA Cup	Total
(Italy) Gianluca Zambrotta	33	-	6	39
(Netherlands) Clarence Seedorf	30	1	5	36
(Czech Republic) Marek Jankulovski	31	-	3	34
(Brazil) Kaká	28	1	3	32
(Italy) Paolo Maldini	30	-	1	31
(Brazil) Alexandre Pato	28	-	3	31
(Italy) Andrea Pirlo	26	-	3	29
(France) Mathieu Flamini	22	1	6	29
(Italy) Christian Abbiati	28	-	-	28
(Italy) Massimo Ambrosini	24	-	4	28
(Italy) Giuseppe Favalli	21	1	5	27
(Italy) Filippo Inzaghi	15	-	6	21
(Italy) Daniele Bonera	16	-	4	20
(England) David Beckham	18	-	1	19
(Brazil) Ronaldinho	16	1	2	19
(Brazil) Dida	9	1	8	18
(Italy) Gennaro Gattuso	11	-	3	14
(Georgia (country)) Kakha Kaladze	10	1	3	14
(Switzerland) Philippe Senderos	7	1	5	13
(Italy) Luca Antonini	4	1	6	11
(Ukraine) Andriy Shevchenko	2	1	6	9
(Brazil) Emerson	3	1	3	7
(Italy) Marco Borriello	6	-	-	6
(Australia) Zeljko Kalac	1	-	-	1
