= Altin Grbović =

Serbian footballer

Personal information
- Date of birth: 13 March 1986 (age 40)
- Place of birth: Novi Pazar, SFR Yugoslavia
- Height: 1.82 m (5 ft 11 1/2 in)
- Position: Forward

Youth career
- Red Star Belgrade

Senior career*
Years	Team	Apps	(Gls)
2004–2007	Novi Pazar	64	(15)
2007–2009	Delta Tulcea	10	(4)
2008–2009	Novi Pazar	11	(5)
2009–2011	Shkumbini Peqin	28	(11)
2011	Skënderbeu Korçë	0	(0)
2012	Zvijezda Gradačac	16	(5)
2013	Sabah	10	(3)
2014–2016	Jošanica		
Total		139	(43)
- * Club domestic league appearances and goals

Altin Grbović (Serbian Cyrillic: Алтин Грбовић; born 13 March 1986) is a Serbian retired footballer. He quit professional playing in 2014. The last professional club was Sabah from Malaysia.

Altin Grbović a graduate of philology, department of English language. Altin Grbovic is currently the director of the institution in the Bosniak National Council, the institution "Sandžačke igre", and vice president at Sportski savez Novi Pazar. Altin is married to Emela Suljović Grbović, a doctor specialist in ophthalmology, and they have four children

== Honours ==
Skënderbeu Korçë

- SuperSport Trophy: 2010–11
