= Taçi Oil Cup =

Taçi Oil Cup Trofeu Taçi Oil
- Founded: 2008
- Abolished: 2010
- Region: UEFA
- Teams: 2
- Last champions: (Spain) Real Madrid (1st title)
- Most championships: (Albania) Tirana (Spain) Real Madrid (Italy) Milan (1 title each)
- Website: fshf.org

The Taçi Oil Cup (Albanian: Trofeu Taçi Oil) was an annual friendly football competition held in Albania. The competition took place in Tirana between 2008 and 2010. The tournament was organized by Albanian businessman Rezart Taçi in cooperation with UNICEF from 2008 to 2010.

== Editions ==
=== 2008 ===
In the inaugural match, Tirana faced then-FIFA Club World Cup winners Milan. Tirana won the match thanks to the screamers of Xhafaj and Muzaka, while the consolation goal for Milan came from Ronaldinho in the last moments of the match. The profits from the tickets went for charity.

14 October 2008	Tirana	2–1	Milan	Tirana
20:00 CEST	Xhafaj 29'; Muzaka 72'		Ronaldinho 90+1'	Stadium: Qemal Stafa Stadium; Attendance: 20,000; Referee: Albano Janku

=== 2009 ===
In the second edition, Albania national team faced Milan. The Rossoneri took a double-advantage thanks to the goals of Ronaldinho and Shevchenko, but Albania fired back by overturning the results with the strikers of Vila, Muzaka and Salihi in a period of 12 minutes. Milan, however, equalized in the 87th minute with the goal of Inzaghi. Then Milan claimed their 1st trophy by winning 5–4 in penalty shootouts, with Albania's Elvin Beqiri missing the decisive penalty.

12 May 2009	Albania	3–3 (4–5 p)	Milan	Tirana
19:00 CEST	Vila 64'; Muzaka 71'; Salihi 76'		Ronaldinho 22'; Shevchenko 48'; Inzaghi 87'	Stadium: Qemal Stafa Stadium; Attendance: 20,000
	Penalties
	Pisha (penalty scored); Muzaka (penalty scored); Vila (penalty scored); Vrapi (penalty scored); Beqiri (penalty missed)		(penalty scored) Kaká; (penalty scored) Seedorf; (penalty scored) Flamini; (penalty scored) Thiago Silva; (penalty scored) Inzaghi

=== 2010 ===
On 10 January, it was reported that Gramozi Ersekë (Rezart Taçi's city club) will face Spanish giants Real Madrid ten days later, thus leaving Milan for the first time outside the competition. Before the start of the match, a one minute of silence was held in the honour of Panajot Pano, who just died two days earlier. Xhafaj opened the score after only two minutes by heading a Marko dos Santos' cross, beating Dudek. However, Real bounced back and scored a header via Kaká, and then Benzema netted the winner nine minutes before the final whistle, making Real Madrid the third team to win the trophy.

20 January 2010	Gramozi Ersekë	1–2	Real Madrid	Tirana
18:00 CEST	Xhafaj 2'		Kaká 36'; Benzema 81'	Stadium: Qemal Stafa Stadium; Attendance: 20,000; Referee: Sokol Jareci

== Titles by club ==
Team	Titles
(Albania) Tirana	1
(Italy) Milan	1
(Spain) Real Madrid	1

== Participation by club ==
Participation(s)	Team(s)
2	Milan
1	Tirana, Albania, Gramozi Ersekë, Real Madrid,

== Top goalscorers ==
Position	Player	Club	Goals
1	(Albania) Daniel Xhafaj	(Albania) Tirana/Gramozi Ersekë	2
1	(Albania) Gjergji Muzaka	Tirana/Albania	2
1	(Brazil) Ronaldinho	(Italy) Milan	2
4	(Ukraine) Andriy Shevchenko	(Italy) Milan	1
4	(Albania) Emiljano Vila	Albania	1
4	(Albania) Hamdi Salihi	Albania	1
4	(Italy) Filippo Inzaghi	(Italy) Milan	1
4	(Brazil) Kaká	(Spain) Real Madrid	1
4	(France) Karim Benzema	(Spain) Real Madrid	1

== See also ==
- Independence Cup (Albania)
- 2011 SuperSport Trophy
- Taçi Oil
