= Daniel Xhafaj =

Albanian footballer (born 1977)

Personal information
- Date of birth: 1 May 1977 (age 49)
- Place of birth: Vlorë, PSR Albania
- Height: 1.87 m (6 ft 2 in)
- Position: Striker

Youth career
- 1992–1995: Flamurtari Vlorë

Senior career*
Years	Team	Apps	(Gls)
1995–1999	Flamurtari Vlorë	70	(17)
2000–2003	Dinamo Tirana	63	(23)
2000	→ Bylis Ballsh (loan)	12	(8)
2003	Flamurtari Vlorë	21	(4)
2003–2007	Teuta Durrës	89	(62)
2005–2006	→ Neuchâtel Xamax (loan)	21	(3)
2007–2009	Tirana	63	(18)
2009–2010	Besa Kavajë	32	(18)
2010–2011	Flamurtari Vlorë	31	(19)
2011–2012	Skënderbeu Korçë	24	(11)
2012–2014	Teuta Durrës	55	(24)
2015	Dinamo Tirana	3	(0)
Total		481	(207)

International career^{‡}
2007	Albania	1	(0)
- * Club domestic league appearances and goals as of 21 February 2015 ‡ National team caps and goals as of 6 June 2007

Daniel Xhafaj (born 1 May 1977) is an Albanian retired professional footballer. Mainly as a striker, he could also play as second striker.

He spent the majority of career playing in Albania where he enjoyed success with Dinamo Tirana, Teuta Durrës, Tirana, Besa Kavajë and Skënderbeu Korçë. Throughout his 20-year career, Xhafaj was known for his goalscoring ability and for being a deadly striker inside the zone. With 204 goals, he is the second top goalscorer in Albanian Superliga history.

An Albania international, Xhafaj has been capped only once with Albania in 2007.

== Club career ==
=== Early career ===
A Flamurtari Vlorë product, Xhafaj made his professional debut in the 1995–96 season. He found more space to play in the next season, appearing in 11 league matches, but still went goalless. Xhafaj scored his first goal during the 1997–98 season. He went on to score two more times during that season, as Flamurtari avoided relegation for only three points. Xhafaj enjoyed his breakthrough season in 1998–98 where he netted 10 goals in 23 league appearances as Flamurtari once again barely avoided relegation.

Xhafaj scored 4 times in 13 league appearances during the first part of 1999–2000 season, before was sent on loan at fellow top flight side Bylis Ballsh to win more experience. He impressed during his short spell at Ballsh, scoring 8 times in 12 league appearances. Bylis finished the league in a respectable 5th place.

Xhafaj's performances earned him a transfer to capital club Dinamo Tirana. He scored 10 goals in 25 league appearances as Dinamo Tirana finished 3rd. He won his first major trophy in the 2001–02 season when Dinamo clinched the championship title for the 16th time. He also played in European competitions for the first time as Dinamo was eliminated by Dinamo București in the first qualifying round of 2001–02 UEFA Cup.

Xhafaj declined in the first half of 2002–03 season where he scored only twice in 13 league appearances. In January 2003, he returned to his first club Flamurtari Vlorë where he played until autumn of 2003. Xhafaj scored only 4 goals in 21 league appearances during his second spell with The Red and Blacks.

=== Teuta Durrës ===
Xhafaj joined Teuta Durrës in the autumn of 2003 where he went to play in the next four years. He scored his first league goal on 25 October 2003 in the matchday 9 versus Besa Kavajë. He then scored a hat-trick, his second in the Albanian Superliga, to give Teuta all three points against the same opponent. Xhafaj finished his first season at Durrës by scoring 21 goals in 24 league matches as Teuta finished 5th which qualified them to the 2004 UEFA Intertoto Cup first round.

He began the 2004–05 season on 20 June by playing in the round of UEFA Intertoto Cup against MFK Dubnica as Teuta earned a goalless draw. Xhafaj also played in the returned leg as Teuta was thrashed 4–0 at Mestský štadión which confirmed their elimination for the competition. Xhafaj started the domestic season on 21 August by appearing the opening championship day, a 6–1 loss to Vllaznia Shkodër. He opened his scoring account later on 25 September by netting the lone goal in the match versus Laçi. Xhafaj scored another winner three weeks later in the matchday 8 against Dinamo Tirana.

He scored his first hat-trick of the season on 23 April of the following year in the 5–0 win over underdogs of Laçi. He repeated the feat two weeks later in the 3–5 loss to Tirana. He finished 2004–05 by netting 21 goals in 34 league matches, missing the Golden Boot to Partizani Tirana's Dorian Bylykbashi. Teuta Durrës once again finished 5th in the championship. This meant the qualification to the UEFA Cup first qualifying round.

Teuta begun their UEFA cup campaign on 14 July 2005 where they faced Bosnia outfit Široki Brijeg in the first round. Xhafa scored his first European goal to lead the team into a 3–1 home win. Teuta blew up a two-goal lead in the returning leg and was eliminated 4–3 on aggregate. Xhafaj then spent the remaining 2005–06 season on loan at Swiss Super League side Neuchâtel Xamax where he netted 3 goals in 21 league matches. He also played two cup matches and returned to Teuta in the summer of 2006.

On 9 July 2006, Xhafaj was sent on loan to Elbasani for the club UEFA Champions League campaign. He made his first UEFA Champions League appearance two days later in the first leg of first qualifying round versus Ekranas as Elbasani won 1–0 at Ruzhdi Bizhuta Stadium. He also played in the returning leg as Elbasani lost 0–3 and was eliminated 1–3 on aggregate. Xhafaj returned to Teuta following Elbasani's elimination.

Xhafaj started his 4th Teuta season on 26 August by netting a brace in the opening matchday of 2006–07 Albanian Superliga versus Dinamo Tirana. He scored his 100th Albanian Superliga goal later on 21 October in the 0–2 win at Shkumbini Peqin. Xhafaj recorded his 50th league goal for Teuta on 2 December in the 2–0 win versus Apolonia Fier. He finished 2006–07 season by netting 20 goals in 31 league appearances as Teuta finished runner-up in championship to Tirana. Teuta also reached the final of Albanian Cup, where Xhafaj scored one of his team's goals in an eventual 3–2 defeat at the hands of Besa Kavajë.

Xhafaj left the club in July 2007. He finished his spell at Teuta with 65 goals in 96 appearances in all competitions.

=== Tirana ===
Xhafaj completed a transfer to Albania most successful club Tirana as a free agent. Priror to that, he had an unsuccessful trial at Austrian Football Bundesliga outfit Rapid Wien. Xhafaj was allocated his favourite squad number 22, and started the season on 15 August by playing in the 2007 Albanian Supercup where Tirana won 4–2 versus Besa Kavajë to clinch the first trophy of the season. It was his third career trophy. His league debut occurred one week later in the 0–1 loss away to Flamurtari Vlorë in the opening championship week. Xhafaj endured a slow start to the season and was out of form in the first matches. He had to wait until 7 November to score his first goal of the season; he netted a header in 39th minute against his former team Teuta Durrës to temporarily level the figures in an eventual 2–1 win. His second of the season came later in round 14 in the 3–2 home win over Skënderbeu Korçë which was the third league win in a row. At the end of 2007, Xhafaj was ranked 43rd in the list of top 50 goalscorers by IFFHS. Xhafaj slightly improved in the second part of the season, netting in both legs of 2007–08 Albanian Cup second round tie versus Laçi. He also scored in the 2–1 win versus Elbasani in matchday 25. It was a season to forget for Tirana as they ended up 6th in championship like never before. Xhafaj himself managed to score only 8 league goals, his worst tally in Albania since 2002–03 season. He however was able to score 4 cup goals as Tirana lost in final to Vllaznia Shkodër. Following the end of the season, Xhafaj was the only player on contract with Tirana.

Xhafaj was sent on loan at fellow capital side Dinamo for their Champions League campaign. He played in the first leg of second qualifying round as Dinamo lost 0–2 at home versus Modriča. He also played in the returning leg, scoring in 72nd minute which revived Dinamo hopes of qualification before Modriča scored twice in the last minutes to win 2–1.

Xhafaj begun his domestic season on 24 August 2008 by appearing in the goalless draw of Albania derby versus Vllaznia Shkodër. He scored his first goal of the season in matchday 3 against Partizani Tirana in the capital derby. Xhafaj was also on the score-sheet of the inaugural Taçi Oil Cup match versus then-FIFA Club World Cup winners Milan on 14 October. He scored with a shot just inside the zone in an eventual 2–1 win. Xhafaj scored his first cup goal of 2008–09 season later on 29 October in the 1–1 draw versus Tërbuni Pukë in the first leg of first round. Xhafaj eventually finished the season with 10 league goals as Tirana clinched their 24 championship in history; this was Xhafaj second Albanian Superliga title. He also scored twice in Tirana's run in cup as the team was defeated 1–2 by Flamurtari Vlorë in the final.

Xhafaj begun his third Tirana season by playing in the second qualifying round on 2009–10 UEFA Europa League against Stabæk Fotball. He played in both legs as Tirana was crashed out of competition 1–5 on aggregate. He left the club in August 2009. His spell with the capital club was marred by his wrong positioning on the field and poor relationship with manager Sulejman Mema.

=== Besa Kavajë ===
Xhafaj signed for Besa Kavajë on 27 August 2009 after having played in the Champions League qualifiers with previous club Tirana against Norwegian side Stabæk. Tirana's failure to qualify to the next round lead to Xhafaj considering his options, one of those came from Besa's president Nexhat Bizhdili who had great ambitions to make Besa one of Albania's top sides. Just days before finalising the deal for the striker, he had a meeting with Bizhdili to discuss a possible transfer, after he was convinced he signed on 27 August 2009 and trained with the rest of the club at their preseason training camp in Mavrovë.

Xhafaj made a dream debut by scoring a brace in the 2–0 home win versus Vllaznia Shkodër in the opening championship matchday. The brace was followed by the winner against Skënderbeu Korçë in round 5 which placed Besa in first place tied on points with Dinamo. On 29 November 2009, in the matchday 12 away against Vllaznia Shkodër, Xhafaj scored in the 35th second of the match to make it the 4th fastest goal ever in Albanian Superliga; Besa won 3–2. It was his first league goal after six matches. His goal was ranked the fourth fastest ever in the championship behind Stevan Račić, Gjergji Muzaka and Migen Memelli.

Xhafaj begun second part of the season on prolific form; he scored in each of three four league matches as Besa collected 12 points to remain in second position 12 points behind the leader Dinamo. Priror to that he scored in the third edition of Taçi Oil Cup against Spanish giants Real Madrid while representing Gramozi Ersekë; he scored inside two minutes to give Gramozi the lead in an eventual 1–2 loss at Qemal Stafa Stadium. Xhafaj also scored in both legs of 2009–10 Albanian Cup third round tie versus Tirana as Besa progressed thanks to away goal rule.

Xhafaj reached double-figures for the second season in a row on 7 March 2010 by netting his team's lone goal in a 1–2 home loss to Skënderbeu Korçë. On 9 May, Xhafaj won his first trophy with Besa, the Albanian Cup, after defeating Vllaznia 2–1 at extra-time. His first hat-trick of the season came later on 14 May in the penultimate matchday versus Gramozi Ersekë as Besa won 6–4. It was his first hat-trick in three years and 4th overall. The hat-trick and a goal in the last matchday versus Dinamo lifted the striker tally to 18 goals which allowed him to clinch the Golden Boot for the first time in career, leaving behind Dinamo's Elis Bakaj. Xhafaj eventually finished the season by netting 21 goals between league and cup, as Besa finished runner-up in league to Dinamo to secure a spot to Europe for next season. He left the club in the first days of June.

=== Flamurtari Vlorë ===
Xhafaj returned to Flamurtari Vlorë on 12 June 2010 by agreeing a deal worth €70,000 per season. He was presented on the same day where he was given squad number 22.

He made his third Flamurtari debut on 21 August by netting the winner versus current champions Dinamo Tirana in the opening matchday of championship. This was followed by a brace against the other capital club Tirana in the second matchday to lead the team into a 2–1 win and first place in championship.

Starting from October, Xhafaj went on to score in 7 consecutive league matches, including in the 4–0 home win against title challengers Skënderbeu Korçë on 7 November. Priror to that, he was sent-off in the 1–3 away loss to Shkumbini Peqin on 17th which forced him to miss the next match against Laçi which was won 1–0 a week later. His run came to an end on 13 December in the 1–0 win to Besa Kavajë. Flamurtari finished the first part of the season in the first place three points ahead of the closest follower. Xhafaj himself scored an impressive 12 goals in 15 matches.

Xhafaj started 2011 by scoring a goal in each of first three league matches of the second part of the season; the first was in the 1–2 win at Kastrioti Krujë, the second in the 4–2 win over Shkumbini Peqin and the third from a winner against Laçi. This wins helped the team to extend the league lead to Skënderbeu.

Xhafaj was protagonist in the controversial 0–1 away loss to Skënderbeu in the "championship battle". Flamurtari lost to a controversial penalty awarded in 31st minute by the referee. As if that was not enough, the team also played for more than half-hour with 10 players after the expulsion of Bledar Devolli. Xhafaj went to publicly accuse the referee for deciding the game. In an interview in 2017, where he was asked about this match, Xhafaj stated: "I have not feel well to see that episodes. In my long career, it is the first time that a game which decides the title gets determines by a referee like this, because he determined that. This is a disaster and I invite AFA to interfere, because they decide for the referees." They were also deducted three points by AFA after abandoning the game versus Vllaznia Shkodër; they abandon the game in 89th minute after a penalty assigned to Vllaznia. Flamurtari at that point was winning 1–0 with the goal of Xhafaj. Federation gave Vllaznia a 3–0 walkover win.

Flamurtari finished the championship on second place. For Xhafaj it was a good season in personal terms, as he managed to win Golden Boot for the second consecutive season after netting 19 goals in 31 matches. He was also named Player of the Year by UEFA. Xhafaj also made 2 cup appearances as Flamurtari was eliminated in the second round.

He was released by the Flamurtari chairman Shpëtim Gjika on 19 July 2011, along with three other main players, Sebino Plaku, Bledar Devolli and Julian Ahmataj.

=== Skënderbeu Korçë ===
Despite interest from Greek side PAS Giannina, Xhafaj signed a one-year contract with Albanian champions Skënderbeu Korçë on 23 July 2011, just 4 days after being released by Flamurtari. It was believed he had signed a contract worth €70,000 for the 2011–12 season. Xhafaj was handed squad number 22 and made his debut on 18 August in the 2011 Albanian Supercup versus Tirana as Skënderbeu lost 0–1 at home. This match was also delayed for one hour due to clashes among fans. He made his first league appearance later on 10 September in the goalless draw against Tomori Berat in the opening matchday.

Xhafaj opened his scoring account on 31 October by netting the lone goal versus Kastrioti Krujë, which ended a run of 501 minutes of football without a goal. It was also Skënderbeu's first win under Stanislav Levý management. Xhafa scored again one month later in the 2011–12 Albanian Cup Group C match versus Luftëtari Gjirokastër to help Skënderbeu win 2–0 at home. The team eventually finished second in the group which secured them a spot to quarter-finals.

Xhafaj then scored a brace on 5 December in Skënderbeu's 3–2 defeat of Bylis Ballsh to lift the team to 3rd place in championship. He was named Man of the Match. He kicked off 2012 by netting his 4th cup goal in matchday 2 of quarter-finals Group 2 versus Laçi in a 1–2 win at Laçi Stadium. Xhafaj reached double-figures in league for the 4th consecutive season on 12 May where he netted a brace in the 1–3 win at Pogradeci, which eventually relegated the latter.

Xhafaj finished his season as Skënderbeu top goalscorer. He scored 15 goals in all competitions, including 11 in league as the team won the championship for the second successive year. He was also important in the team's run in cup, scoring 4 goals in 10 appearances as Skënderbeu lost to Tirana in the final.

Xhafaj continued to be part of the team in the Champions League second qualifying round. He played in both legs as starter as Skënderbeu was eliminated by Debreceni 1–3 on aggregate. He left the club in the first days of August 2012 after failing to find a way for the new contract.

=== Return to Teuta Durrës ===
On 2 August 2012, Xhafaj returned to Teuta Durrës after a 5-year absence by signing a one-year contract. He took his favourite squad number 22 and commenced the season later on 26 August in the 0–1 win at Shkumbini Peqin. He wasted the chance to score a penalty in 61st minute but his attempt was saved by Elvis Kotorri. Xhafaj missed the second matchday due to injury. He had to wait until 10 November to score his first goals of the season in form of a brace to give his team all three points in the match versus Apolonia Fier; his brace came inside four minutes to seal a 1–2 win at Loni Papuçiu Stadium which lifted Teuta to second place. One week later he scored his first goal at home to seal a 3–0 his former side Bylis Ballsh.

On 9 December, Xhafaj received a straight red-card during the 4–0 loss to Laçi in a cup match. It was his first red-card since October 2010. He began the second part of the season on strong fashion, scoring brace in each of the first two matches as Teuta won 3–0 and 2–0 respectively against Shkumbini Peqin and Luftëtari Gjirokastër. Xhafaj finished 2012–13 season with 10 goals in 23 league appearances as Teuta finished runner-up to Skënderbeu in championship. In addition he also made 3 cup appearances as Teuta was eliminated in Group B of 2012–13 Albanian Cup quarter-finals.

Xhafaj signed a new one-year contract with Teuta on 16 July 2013, lengthening his career at Durrës. Speaking of that, Xhafaj said: "I accepted to be part of Teuta for another season, because I feel good here. We passed a wonderfull season and achieved Europe. We have new challenges for the new season." He started 2013–14 season by scoring the opener of the 3–1 home win over Dacia Chişinău in the first leg of 2013–14 UEFA Europa League first qualifying round. Teuta lost the second leg 0–2 and was eliminated on away goal rule. The match was classified as fixed by Federbet, the anti match fixing organisation.

Xhafaj begun the domestic season on 31 August by netting a header in the 2–1 win over Bylis Ballsh in the matchday 1 of 2013–14 Albanian Superliga. He was named Albanian Superliga Player of the Month for September 2013 after bagging two goals in four matches which gave Teuta six points. October was even more prolific for the veteran as he scored four goals in four matches, including a brace in the 3–2 win over Vllaznia Shkodër, to help Teuta catch the first place in championship.

In December 2013, Xhafaj performances were rewarded with Albanian Footballer of the Year award, becoming the first Teuta Durrës to win it. He declined in the second part of 2013–14 season, netting only five times in 16 matches as Teuta eventually finished 4th. Overall, Xhafaj scored 14 goals in 32 league appearances, improving his last season tally. He also played 4 times in cup as Teuta was eliminated in the semi-finals to Kukësi.

He left the team on 30 May 2014 at the end of the season after his contract expired and the club's directors decided not to renew his contract. Xhafaj finished his third spell with Sea Boys by scoring 25 goals in 64 matches in all competitions.

=== Dinamo Tirana and retirement ===
In November 2014, Xhafaj begun training with Dinamo Tirana as he was a free agent at that time. His approach to the club was greeted by the club's administrator Saliaj, who went on to say: "It's an honour and pleasure to have back an ex-champion of Dinamo back on the team again to contribute in this category." On 15 January of the following year, Xhafaj officially signed a one-year contract with the club, with the month salary reported to be 150,000 Albanian lek (around €1,100). He made his first appearance of the season on 7 February by playing the entire match of the 1–0 away defeat at Lushnja. After that, he went on to make further two league appearances before retiring from the sport in March 2015.

== International career ==
Xhafaj was called for the first time in senior team in May 2007 by manager Otto Barić for the friendly versus England B. He was the only Albania player not to play in the match as Albania lost 1–3 at Turf Moor. Xhafaj continued to be part of the team for the UEFA Euro 2008 qualifying matches against Luxembourg. He made his competitive debut in the second match on 6 June, appearing in the last 13 minutes as Albania won 0–3 at Stade Josy Barthel. Xhafaj received another call-up in January 2008 for gathering between 14 and 23 January in Antalya, Turkey.

== Career statistics ==
=== Club ===
As of 21 February 2015

Appearances and goals by club, season and competition
Club	Season	League			Cup		Europe		Other		Total	
Club	Season	Division	Apps	Goals	Apps	Goals	Apps	Goals	Apps	Goals	Apps	Goals
Flamurtari Vlorë	1995–96	Albanian Superliga	1	0	0	0	—		—		1	0
Flamurtari Vlorë	1996–97	Albanian Superliga	11	0	0	0	—		—		11	0
Flamurtari Vlorë	1997–98	Albanian Superliga	22	3	0	0	—		—		22	3
Flamurtari Vlorë	1998–99	Albanian Superliga	23	10	0	0	—		—		23	10
Flamurtari Vlorë	1999–2000	Albanian Superliga	13	4	2	5	—		—		15	9
Flamurtari Vlorë	Total		70	17	2	5	—		—		72	22
Bylis Ballsh	1999–2000	Albanian Superliga	12	8	0	0	—		—		12	8
Dinamo Tirana	2000–01	Albanian Superliga	25	10	0	0	—		—		25	10
Dinamo Tirana	2001–02	Albanian Superliga	25	11	0	0	2 (Note: Appearance(s) in UEFA Cup)	0	—		27	11
Dinamo Tirana	2002–03	Albanian Superliga	13	2	0	0	4 (Note: Appearance(s) in UEFA Champions League)	0	0	0	17	2
Dinamo Tirana	Total		63	23	0	0	6	0	0	0	69	23
Flamurtari Vlorë	2002–03	Albanian Superliga	14	4	0	0	—		—		14	4
Flamurtari Vlorë	2003–04	Albanian Superliga	7	0	0	0	—		—		7	0
Flamurtari Vlorë	Total		21	4	0	0	—		—		21	4
Teuta Durrës	2003–04	Albanian Superliga	24	21	0	0	—		—		24	21
Teuta Durrës	2004–05	Albanian Superliga	34	21	0	0	2 (Note: Appearance(s) in UEFA Intertoto Cup)	0	—		36	21
Teuta Durrës	2005–06	Albanian Superliga	0	0	0	0	2	1	—		2	1
Teuta Durrës	2006–07	Albanian Superliga	31	20	1	1	—		—		32	21
Teuta Durrës	2007–08	Albanian Superliga	0	0	0	0	2	1	—		2	1
Teuta Durrës	Total		89	62	1	1	6	2	—		96	65
Neuchâtel Xamax (loan)	2005–06	Swiss Super League	21	3	2	0	0	0	—		23	3
Elbasani (loan)	2006–07	Albanian Superliga	0	0	0	0	2	0	0	0	2	0
Tirana	2007–08	Albanian Superliga	32	8	7	4	—		1 (Note: Appearance in Albanian Supercup)	0	40	12
Tirana	2008–09	Albanian Superliga	31	10	7	2	—		—		38	12
Tirana	2009–10	Albanian Superliga	0	0	0	0	2	0	0	0	2	0
Tirana	Total		63	18	14	6	2	0	1	0	80	24
Dinamo Tirana (loan)	2008–09	Albanian Superliga	0	0	0	0	2	1	—		2	1
Besa Kavajë	2009–10	Albanian Superliga	32	18	7	3	—		—		39	21
Flamurtari Vlorë	2010–11	Albanian Superliga	31	19	2	0	—		—		33	19
Flamurtari Vlorë	2011–12	Albanian Superliga	0	0	0	0	3 (Note: Appearance(s) in UEFA Europa League)	1	—		3	1
Flamurtari Vlorë	Total		31	19	2	0	3	1	—		36	20
Skënderbeu Korçë	2011–12	Albanian Superliga	24	11	10	4	—		1	0	35	15
Skënderbeu Korçë	2012–13	Albanian Superliga	0	0	0	0	2	0	0	0	2	0
Skënderbeu Korçë	Total		24	11	10	4	2	0	1	0	37	15
Teuta Durrës	2012–13	Albanian Superliga	23	10	3	0	—		—		26	10
Teuta Durrës	2013–14	Albanian Superliga	32	14	4	0	2	1	—		38	15
Teuta Durrës	Total		55	24	7	0	2	1	—		64	25
Dinamo Tirana	2014–15	Albanian First Division	3	0	0	0	—		—		3	0
Career total			481	207	45	19	25	5	2	0	553	231

=== International ===
As of 6 June 2007

Appearances and goals by national team and year
National team	Year	Apps	Goals
Albania	2007	1	0
Total		1	0

== Honours ==
Dinamo Tirana

- Albanian Superliga: 2001–02

Teuta Durrës

- Albanian Cup: 2004–05

Tirana

- Albanian Superliga: 2008–09
- Albanian Supercup: 2007

Besa Kavajë

- Albanian Cup: 2009–10

Skënderbeu Korçë

- Albanian Superliga: 2011–12

Individual

- Albanian Superliga Golden Boot: 2009–10, 2010–11
- Albanian Superliga Player of the Month: September 2013
- Albanian Footballer of the Year: 2013
