= Federbet =

Organization of European casino owners and bookmakers

Federbet is an organization of European casino owners and bookmakers that was founded to help unify the laws with respect to gambling in the countries under the European Union, through lobbying and other methods. Part of their operation is to identify match fixing, and to work to eliminate it. Federbet was established in October 2010 in response to the European Commission inquiry regarding on-line gambling. Their headquarters is in Brussels, Paul Tavarelli is the current president of Fedbet, and Francesco Baranca is their secretary general.

== Match fixing ==
Match fixing represents a huge potential loss for bookmakers, as well as an opportunity for money laundering. Thus commercial self-interest and community responsibility conjoin. On this basis Federbet has been successful in convincing legal authorities to crack down on match fixing. For example, in 2010 Spain made match-fixing a criminal offence. An important tool that Federbet uses is its betting database that can track the flow of bets on specific events. Unusual betting patterns highlight fixed matches. For example, a single very large bet for 50,000 euros on an event that usually has a total of around 160,000 euros bet, sets a flag. This combined with an analysis of other betting patterns on the match essentially ensures that the match is fixed.
