= Matteo Bruscagin =

Italian footballer (born 1989)

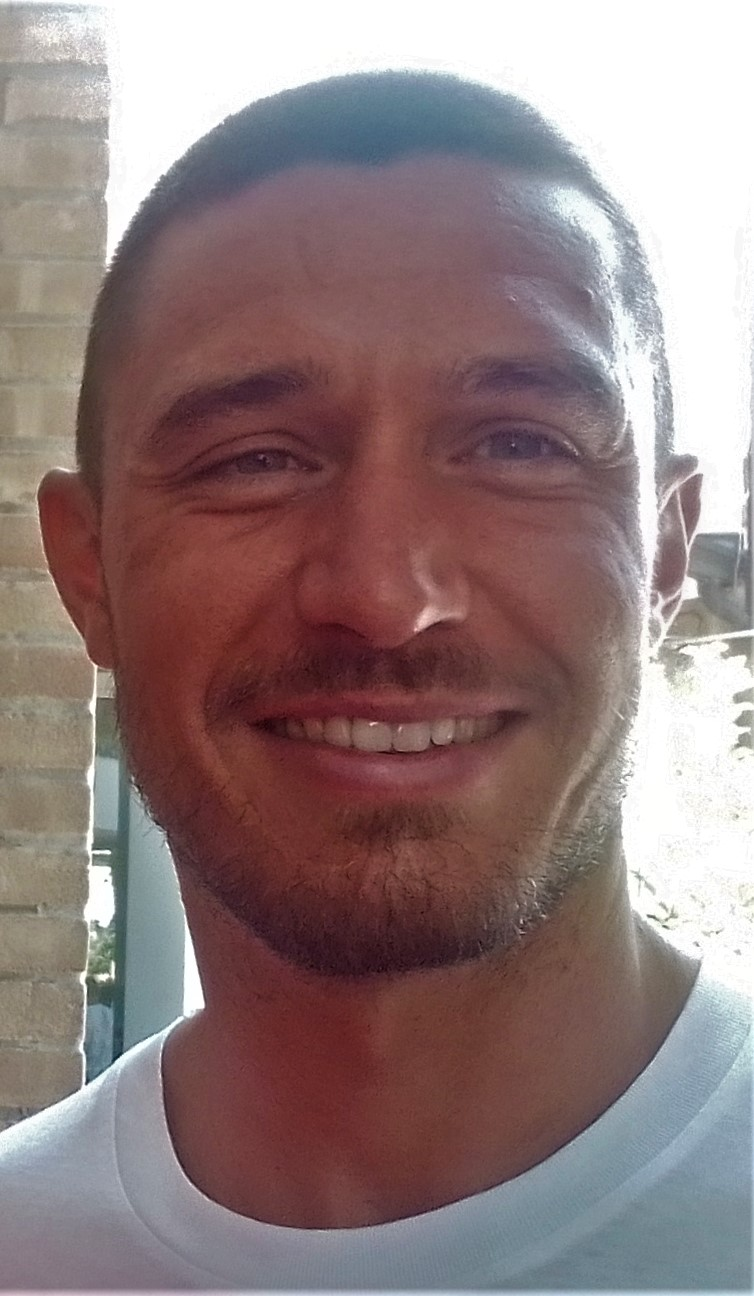

Personal information
- Full name: Matteo Bruscagin
- Date of birth: 3 August 1989 (age 37)
- Place of birth: Milan, Italy
- Height: 1.84 m (6 ft 1/2 in)
- Position: Defender

Team information
- Current team: Latina
- Number: 5

Youth career
- Aldini Bariviera
- 2000–2008: Milan

Senior career*
Years	Team	Apps	(Gls)
2007–2010	Milan	0	(0)
2008–2009	→ Monza (loan)	0	(0)
2009	→ Pizzighettone (loan)	12	(0)
2009–2010	→ Gubbio (loan)	15	(0)
2010–2011	Grosseto	13	(0)
2012–2017	Latina	118	(1)
2017–2019	Venezia	55	(1)
2019–2022	Vicenza	80	(1)
2022–2023	Pordenone	29	(2)
2023–2025	SPAL	38	(0)
2025–2026	Gubbio	31	(1)
2026–	Latina	1	(0)

International career^{‡}
2007–2008	Italy U-19	5	(0)
2008–2010	Italy U-20	6	(0)
- * Club domestic league appearances and goals as of 29 August 2026 ‡ National team caps and goals as of 12 May 2010

Matteo Bruscagin (born 3 August 1989) is an Italian professional footballer who plays as a defender for Serie C Group B club Latina.

== Club career ==
Bruscagin started playing football as a child at amateur club Aldini Bariviera, before joining Milan in 2000. After spending eight years in their youth system, Bruscagin was loaned out to Monza for the 2008–09 season. In January 2009, he was called back due to lack of playing time and sent to Pizzighettone on another loan spell. With his new team, the young defender was eventually able to make his professional debut and a total 12 appearances during the remainder of the season.

At the start of the 2009–10 season, Bruscagin was loaned out again, this time to Gubbio. The following year, he was signed by Grosseto in a co-ownership deal with Milan, for a peppercorn of €1,000. In June 2011 Grosseto acquired Bruscagin outright for free.

In the summer of 2017 Bruscagin signed for newly promoted Serie B club Venezia.

On 23 August 2019, he signed a two-year contract with Vicenza.

On 30 September 2022, Bruscagin joined Serie C club Pordenone for the 2022–23 season.

On 1 August 2023, Bruscagin moved to SPAL on a two-year deal.

Having played for Latina from 2012-2017, he returned to Latina for the 2026-2027 on 23 July 2026

== International career ==
Bruscagin took part in the 2009 FIFA U-20 World Cup with the Italy U-20 squad.

== Personal life ==
On 11 November 2020, he tested positive for COVID-19.
