= 2011 SuperSport Trophy =

- Founded: 2011
- Region: Albania
- Teams: 3
- Current champions: Skënderbeu Korçë (1st title)
- Most championships: Skënderbeu Korçë (1 title)

The SuperSport Trophy was pre-season tournament played by 3 Albanian football teams, organized by SuperSport Albania. This is an unofficial tournament that has been held yearly since 2011. It is not sanctioned or recognized by official football bodies since the gameplay rules do not correspond to IFAB/FIFA laws of football.

== Winners ==
- 2011 Skënderbeu Korçë

== Editions ==
=== 2011 SuperSport Trophy ===
==== Final Tournament Standings ====
- 3 points for win, 0 points for loss
- 2 points for penalty kick win, 1 point for penalty kick loss
- Skënderbeu wins tournament

Rank	Team	GP	W	PK-W	L	PK-L	GF	GA	P
1	(Albania) Skënderbeu Korçë	2	1	1	0	0	2	0	5
2	(Albania) Teuta Durrës	2	1	0	0	1	1	0	4
3	(Albania) KF Laçi	2	0	0	2	0	0	3	0

==== Scorers ====
Rank	Name	Team	Goals
1	(Albania) Ditmar Bicaj	(Albania) Skënderbeu Korçë	1
1	(Croatia) Marko Radas	(Albania) Skënderbeu Korçë	1
1	(Albania) Renato Hyshmeri	(Albania) Teuta Durrës	1

==== Matches ====
3 September 2011	Skënderbeu Korçë (Albania)	2 – 0	(Albania) KF Laçi	Niko Dovana Stadium, Durrës
	Radas 19'; Bicaj 23'

3 September 2011	Teuta Durrës (Albania)	1 – 0	(Albania) KF Laçi	Niko Dovana Stadium, Durrës
	Hyshmeri 30'

3 September 2011	Skënderbeu Korçë (Albania)	0 - 0 (4 - 3 p)	(Albania) Teuta Durrës	Niko Dovana Stadium, Durrës
	Penalties
	Orelesi (penalty missed); Shehi (penalty scored)		(penalty missed) Tahiri
